= Zhao Wei filmography =

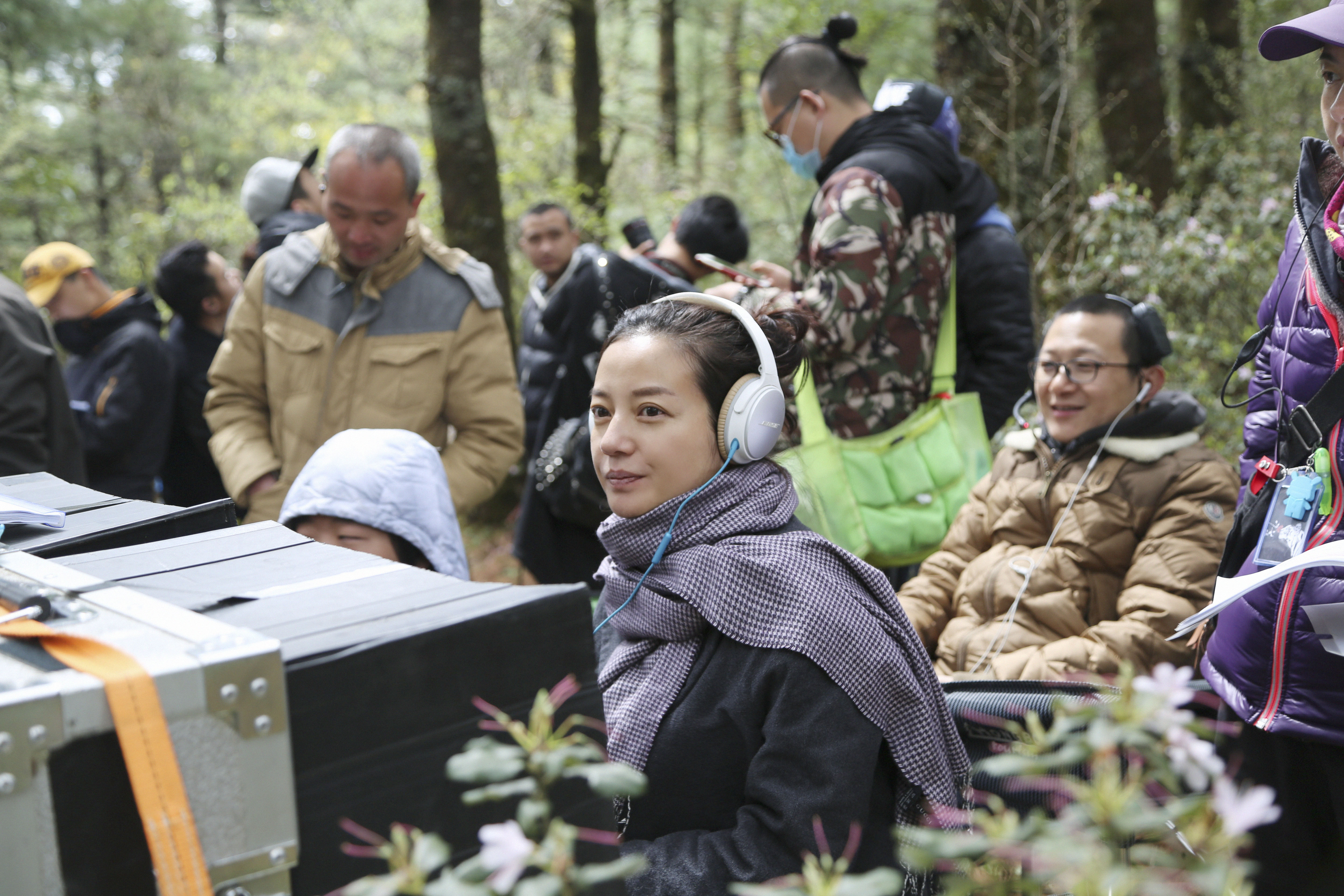
Production still. On 8 April 2016, director Zhao Wei (center) filming her second feature.

This is a complete filmography of Chinese actress, director and producer Zhao Wei. In an acting career that spanned more than twenty years, Zhao performed on screen, television and stage. She is regarded by many as Mainland China's first "national idol" since the reform and opening up began in 1978. Zhao appeared in a range of genres, including comedies, period dramas, modern dramas, actions. Zhao was awarded the Hong Kong Film Award, Hong Kong Film Critics Society Award, Golden Rooster Award, Hundred Flowers Award, Shanghai Film Critics Award, Huabiao Award, Golden Eagle TV Award, and as well as the Shanghai Film Festival Golden Globet.

As one of the most successful Chinese actresses in terms of box office receipts, her films have grossed a total of more than over ¥5 billion yuan in China. Hong Kong Trade Development Council selected her as one of "top box office star" during 2008-2009. Zhao's directorial debut So Young (2013) has grossed over US$118 million with a US$5 million budget. According to New Classic Media's IPO application, Zhao Wei's salary of Tiger Mom (2015) was 42.7925 million yuan, equally 1 million yuan per episode. And the ROI of the show was 300%.

Not only appointed as judges China Film Directors Guild Award, Golden Phoenix Award, Zhao also was named as jury member by several international film festivals main competition, such as Venice, Shanghai and Tokyo.

== As actress ==
=== Film ===
Year	Title	Role	Notes
1994	A Soul Haunted by Painting	Brothel woman	Extra
1995	Penitentiary Angel	Ding Jing'er	
1996	East Palace, West Palace	"Bus"	
1999	Déjà Vu 2000	Vicky	
2000	The Duel	Princess Phoenix	
2001	Shaolin Soccer	Ah Mui	
2002	Chinese Odyssey 2002	Ah Feng (Phoenix)	
2002	So Close	Sue	
2003	My Dream Girl	Zhang Ning	
2003	Green Tea	Wu Fang / Lang Lang	
2003	Warriors of Heaven and Earth	Wen Zhu	
2003	Jade Goddess of Mercy	An Xin	
2005	A Time To Love	Qu Ran	
2006	The Postmodern Life of My Aunt	Liu Dafan	
2007	The Longest Night in Shanghai	Lin Xi	Chinese-Japanese film
2008	Red Cliff: Part 1	Sun Shangxiang	
2008	Painted Skin	Chen Peirong	
2009	Red Cliff: Part 2	Sun Shangxiang	
2009	The Founding of a Republic	CPPCC member	Cameo
2009	Mulan	Hua Mulan	
2010	14 Blades	Qiao Hua	
2011	Eternal Moment	Yang Zheng's wife	Voice cameo
2012	LOVE	Jin Xiaoye	
2012	Painted Skin: The Resurrection	Princess Jing / Xiao Wei	
2014	Dearest	Li Hongqin	
2015	12 Golden Ducks	Aunt Mei (young)	Cameo
2015	Hollywood Adventures	Wei Wei	
2015	Lost in Hong Kong	Cai Bo (Spinach)	
2016	Three	Tong Qian	
2018	Of Lightness	The Woman	Short film
2018	The Light of Tiny Love	Herself	Documentary
2019	No.7 Cherry Lane	Meiling	Voice
2019	Two Tigers	Zhou Yuan	

=== Television ===
Year	Title	Role	Notes
1996	Sisters in Beijing	Bai Xiaoxue	
1996	Yutian Has a Story	Miao Lan	
1997	Magic Formula	Luo Man	
1998	My Fair Princess	Xiaoyanzi	
1998	Records of Kangxi's Travel Incognito	Yue Qing'er	Season 2
1998	Old House Has Joy	Ji Xiang/Li Mei	
1999	My Fair Princess II	Xiaoyanzi	
2000	Treasure Venture	Lu Jianping/Du Huixin	
2001	Romance in the Rain	Lu Yiping	
2005	Moment in Peking	Yao Mulan	
2006	Fast Track Love	Chen Xiaoxiao	
2007	Thank You for Having Loved Me	Tan Yuwei	
2007	Fuwa	Hodori	Voice
2009	The Epic of a Woman	Tian Sufei	
2011	Master Xie Jin	Herself	Documentary of Xie Jin
2015	Tiger Mom	Bi Shengnan	
2017	Chinese Restaurant 1	Herself	Reality Show
2018	Chinese Restaurant 2	Herself	Reality Show

=== Stage ===
Year	Production	Director	Role	Notes
2019	Proof	Tian Zhuangzhuang	Catherine Llewellyn	Adapted from broadway play Proof (2001)

=== Dubbing ===
Year	Title	Role	Notes
1998	The Lion King II: Simba's Pride	Kiara	China version
2004	Shrek 2	Princess Fiona	China version
2007	My Blueberry Nights	Leslie	China version

=== Sound Recording ===
Year	Title	Role	Notes
2014	Peter and the Wolf		Conductor: Claudio Abbado

== As director or producer ==
=== Theatrical releases ===
Year	Film	Director	Producer	Writer	Other	Notes
2013	So Young	Yes				Directorial feature debut
2015	Hollywood Adventures		Yes		Actor	
2019	Starlight	Yes				Documentary, Filming
Unreleased	No Other Love	Yes				Filming took place in 2016. Cast controversies.
2019	Two Tigers		Yes		Actor	Pre-production
TBD	Handsome Man		Yes			Pre-production
TBA	My Fair Princess	Yes				Animated Feature, Adapted from comedy series My Fair Princess

=== Television ===
Year	Film	Director	Producer	Writer	Other	Notes
2015	Tiger Mom		Yes		Actor	Executive Producer
2019			Yes			Executive Producer

=== Music video ===
Year	Film	Director	Producer	Writer	Other	Notes
2007	Angel's Suitcase	Yes			Actor	The title song of Zhao Wei's sixth album

=== Short films ===
Year	Film	Director	Producer	Writer	Other	Notes
2017	One Encounter			Yes		Story

== Other works ==
=== Hosting ===
Year	Film	Notes
2000	CCTV New Year's Gala	
2001	CCTV Lantern Festival Concert	
2002	Huabiao Film Awards Ceremony	
2011	Golden Rooster Awards Ceremony	Opening performance and guest host

=== As Judge ===
Year	Film	Notes
2013-2014	China's Got Talent	Season Five

=== Radio Opera ===
Year	Film	Notes
2001	Tomorrow is a Sunny Day	leading female voice cast

== See also ==
- Awards and nominations received by Zhao Wei
