= List of awards and nominations received by Zhao Wei =

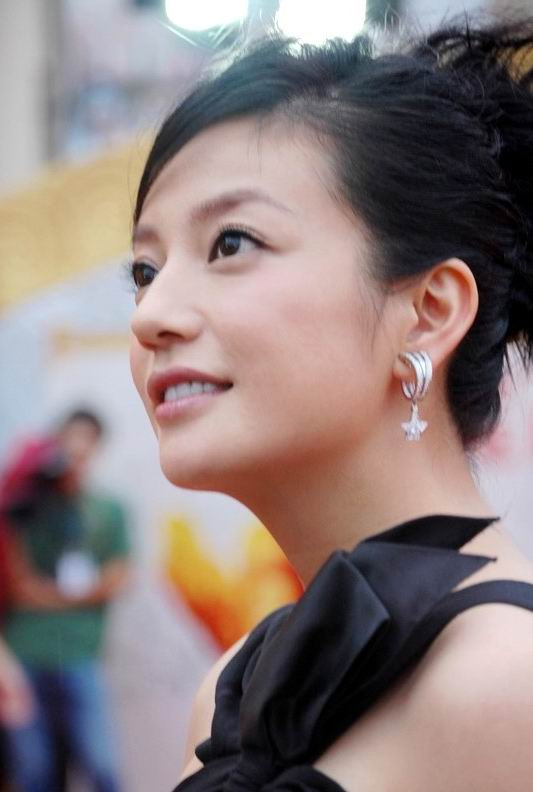
Zhao at Huabiao Award red carpet in 2007

This is a list of awards and nominations for Zhao Wei's acting career in motion pictures, television, and her music career in mandopop recording.

On 27 May 2010, the 13th Shanghai International Film Festival announced that Zhao would make her comeback as a judge on the panel, alongside John Woo, Leos Carax, Amos Gitai, Bill Guttentag, Yōjirō Takita and Wang Xiaoshuai. On 12 June 2010, Zhao attracted immense media attention and cheers from her fans throughout the day at the Shanghai International Film Festival, and she stated that she was pleased to see such a good turnout from the press.

On 19 July 2011, the 20th Golden Rooster and Hundred Flowers Film Festival announced the Retrospective honoured actress, Zhao. The Retrospective will present Zhao's films on screen. On 6 August, Zhao was recruited as vice-president of China Television Actors Guild.

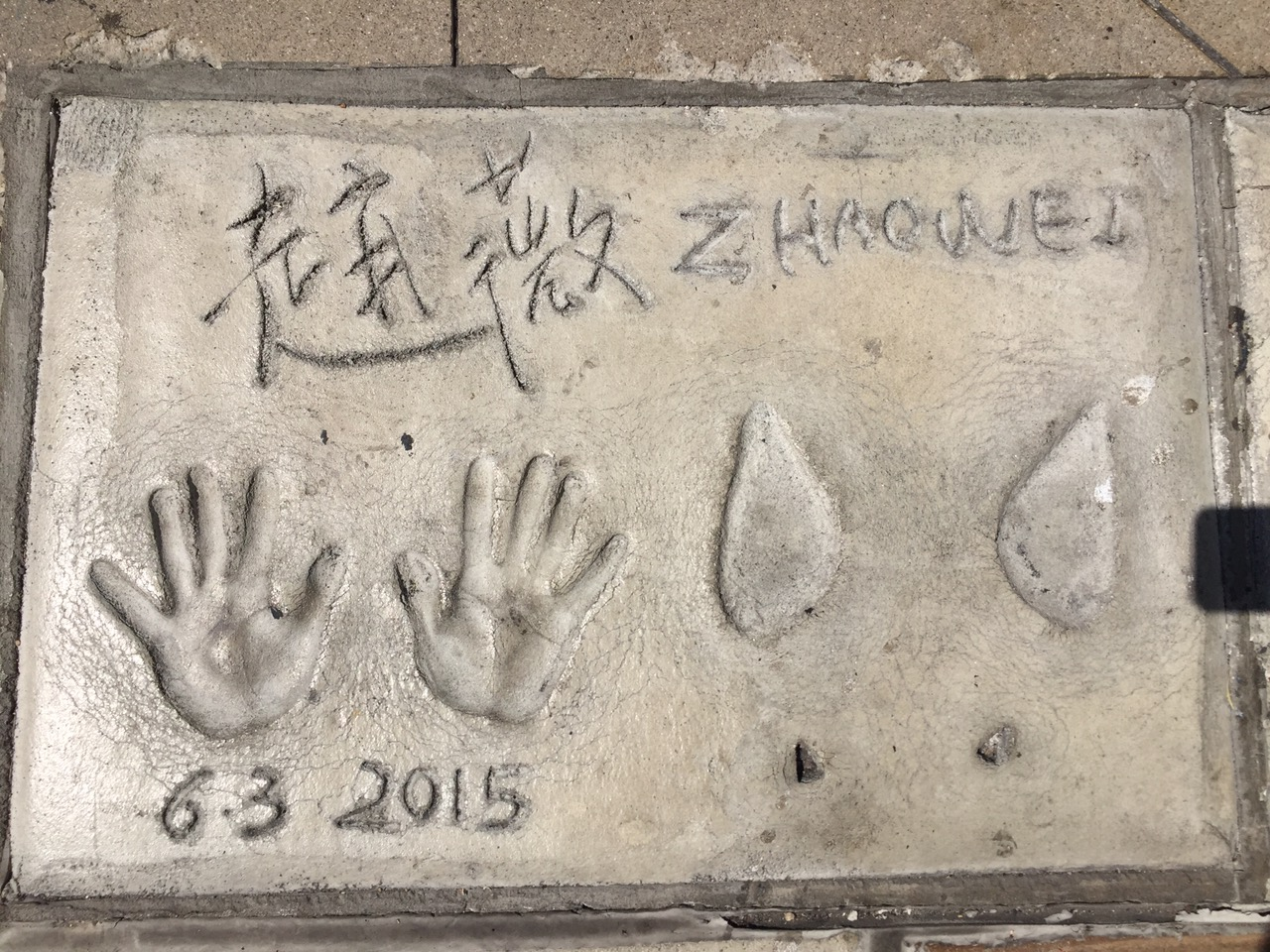
On 3 June 2015, Zhao became the first ever Chinese actress to have left her handprints and footprints at the TCL Chinese Theatre in Hollywood.

In July 2016, she was named as a member of the main competition jury for the 73rd Venice International Film Festival, alongside Sam Mendes, Lorenzo Vigas, Nina Hoss, Gemma Arterton, Laurie Anderson, Joshua Oppenheimer, Chiara Mastroianni and Giancarlo De Cataldo.

In September 2017, she was named as a member of the main competition jury for the 30th Tokyo International Film Festival, alongside Tommy Lee Jones, Reza Mirkarimi, Martin Provost and Masatoshi Nagase.

In March 2018, Zhao Wei was named as a member of the finale-round jury for the 9th China Film Directors Guild Award, alongside Zhang Yimou, Li Shaohong and other directors.

== Film and television awards ==
=== Mainland China Main Awards ===
The three most prestigious film awards in mainland China are the Golden Rooster Awards, Hundred Flowers Awards and the Huabiao Award, while the two most prestigious television awards in mainland China are the Golden Eagle Award and Flying Apsaras Awards.

==== Film ====
Golden Rooster Awards
| Year | Nominated work | Category | Result |
|---|---|---|---|
| 2009 | Painted Skin | Best Actress | Nominated |
| 2013 | So Young | Best Directorial Debut | Won |
| 2015 | Dearest | Best Actress | Nominated |

Hundred Flowers Awards
| Year | Nominated work | Category | Result |
|---|---|---|---|
| 2004 | Warriors of Heaven and Earth | Best Actress | Nominated |
| 2010 | Mulan | Best Actress | Won |
| 2014 | So Young | Best Director | Won |
| 2016 | Dearest | Best Actress | Nominated |

Huabiao Award
| Year | Nominated work | Category | Result |
|---|---|---|---|
| 2005 | A Time to Love | Outstanding Actress | Won |
| 2013 | So Young | Outstanding Youth Filmmaking | Won |

==== Television ====
Golden Eagle Award
| Year | Nominated work | Category | Result |
|---|---|---|---|
| 1999 | My Fair Princess | Best Actress | Won |

Flying Apsaras Awards
| Year | Nominated work | Category | Result |
|---|---|---|---|
| 2007 | Moment in Peking | Outstanding Actress | Nominated |

=== Taiwan and Hong Kong Awards ===
Golden Horse Awards
| Year | Nominated work | Category | Result |
|---|---|---|---|
| 2002 | Chinese Odyssey 2002 | Best Supporting Actress | Nominated |
| 2006 | The Postmodern Life of My Aunt | Best Supporting Actress | Nominated |
| 2013 | So Young | Best New Director | Nominated |
| 2014 | Dearest | Best Actress | Nominated |

Hong Kong Film Awards
| Year | Nominated work | Category | Result |
|---|---|---|---|
| 2008 | The Postmodern Life of My Aunt | Best Supporting Actress | Nominated |
| 2009 | Red Cliff Part I | Best Supporting Actress | Nominated |
| 2010 | Red Cliff Part II | Best Supporting Actress | Nominated |
| 2010 | Mulan | Best Actress | Nominated |
| 2015 | Dearest | Best Actress | Won |

=== Other industry awards ===
Asian Film Awards
| Year | Nominated work | Category | Result |
|---|---|---|---|
| 2009 | Painted Skin | Best Actress | Nominated |
| 2015 | Dearest | Best Actress | Nominated |

Asian Television Awards
| Year | Nominated work | Category | Result |
|---|---|---|---|
| 2015 | Tiger Mom | Best Actress | Nominated |

Chinese Film Media Awards
| Year | Nominated work | Category | Result |
|---|---|---|---|
| 2002 | Shaolin Soccer | Best Actress - Hong Kong/Taiwan | Nominated |
| 2004 | Jade Goddess of Mercy; Green Tea | Favorite Actress - Mainland China | Won |
| 2004 | Jade Goddess of Mercy | Best Actress - Mainland China | Nominated |
| 2008 | The Postmodern Life of My Aunt | Best Supporting Actress | Nominated |
| 2015 | Dearest | Best Actress | Won |
| 2015 | Outstanding achievement in acting and directing | Infinity Award | Won |

China TV Drama Awards
| Year | Nominated work | Category | Result |
|---|---|---|---|
| 2006 | Moment in Peking | Favorite Actress | Won |
| 2006 | Moment in Peking | Best Leading Actress | Nominated |
| 2015 | Tiger Mom | Best Leading Actress | Nominated |

Chinese Young Generation Film Forum
| Year | Nominated work | Category | Result |
|---|---|---|---|
| 2013 | So Young | New Director of the Year | Won |

Chunyan Awards
| Year | Nominated work | Category | Result |
|---|---|---|---|
| 2010 | Painted Skin | Best Actress - Motion Picture | Won |

Huading Awards
| Year | Nominated work | Category | Result |
|---|---|---|---|
| 2013 | So Young | Best New Director | Nominated |
| 2015 | Tiger Mom | Best Actress | Nominated |
| 2015 | Dearest | Best Actress | Won |

Vietnam DAN Movie Awards
| Year | Nominated work | Category | Result |
|---|---|---|---|
| 2009 | Painted Skin | Favorite Chinese Actress | Won |
| 2010 | Mulan | Favorite Chinese Actress | Won |
| 2013 | Painted Skin: The Resurrection | Favorite Chinese Actress | Won |

=== Critics' awards ===
Chinese Cinephilia Society Awards
| Year | Nominated work | Category | Result |
|---|---|---|---|
| 2015 | Dearest | Best Actress | Won |

Hong Kong Film Critics Society Awards
| Year | Nominated work | Category | Result |
|---|---|---|---|
| 2015 | Dearest | Best Actress | Won |

Shanghai Film Critics Awards
| Year | Nominated work | Category | Result |
|---|---|---|---|
| 2010 | Mulan; 14 Blades | Best Actress | Won |
| 2013 | So Young | Best New Director | Won |

=== Guild awards ===
China Film Director's Guild Awards
| Year | Nominated work | Category | Result |
|---|---|---|---|
| 2014 | So Young | Best Director | Nominated |
| 2014 | So Young | Best New Director | Nominated |

Golden Phoenix Awards
| Year | Nominated work | Category | Result |
|---|---|---|---|
| 2005 | Jade Goddess of Mercy | Society Award for Actor | Won |
| 2009 | Painted Skin; Red Cliff; The Longest Night in Shanghai | Special Jury Award | Won |

=== Festival awards ===
Asia Pacific Film Festival
| Year | Nominated work | Category | Result |
|---|---|---|---|
| 2002 | Chinese Odyssey 2002 | Best Supporting Actress | Nominated |

Beijing College Student Film Festival
| Year | Nominated work | Category | Result |
|---|---|---|---|
| 2004 | Warriors of Heaven and Earth | Best Actress | Nominated |
| 2004 | Warriors of Heaven and Earth | Favorite Actress | Won |
| 2007 | The Longest Night in Shanghai; The Postmodern Life of My Aunt | Favorite Actress | Won |
| 2010 | 14 Blades | Favorite Actress | Won |
| 2014 | So Young | Best Directorial Debut | Nominated |
| 2015 | Dearest | Best Actress | Won |

Changchun Film Festival
| Year | Nominated work | Category | Result |
|---|---|---|---|
| 2006 | A Time to Love | Best Actress | Won |
| 2010 | Mulan | Best Actress | Won |

China Farmers Film Festival
| Year | Nominated work | Category | Result |
|---|---|---|---|
| 2011 | 14 Blades | Favorite Actress | Won |

Chinese American Film Festival
| Year | Nominated work | Category | Result |
|---|---|---|---|
| 2013 | So Young | Best Director | Won |
| 2014 | Dearest | Best Actress | Won |

Guangzhou Student Film Festival
| Year | Nominated work | Category | Result |
|---|---|---|---|
| 2012 | Painted Skin: The Resurrection | Favorite Actress | Won |
| 2013 | So Young | Favorite Director | Won |

New York Chinese Film Festival
| Year | Nominated work | Category | Result |
|---|---|---|---|
| 2013 | | Outstanding Asian Artist | Won |

Shanghai International Film Festival
| Year | Nominated work | Category | Result |
|---|---|---|---|
| 2005 | A Time to Love | Best Actress | Won |
| 2007 | The Longest Night in Shanghai | Press Prize for Most Attractive Actress | Won |

Shanghai Television Festival
| Year | Nominated work | Category | Result |
|---|---|---|---|
| 2016 | Tiger Mom | Best Actress | Nominated |

Sichuan Television Festival
| Year | Nominated work | Category | Result |
|---|---|---|---|
| 2015 | Tiger Mom | Best Actress | Nominated |

== Music awards ==
Asia Pacific Music Awards
| Year | Nominated work | Category | Result |
|---|---|---|---|
| 2005 | Afloat | Best Song of the Year | Won |
| 2005 | Afloat | Best Album | Nominated |
| 2005 | Afloat | Best Female Vocal Performance | Nominated |
| 2005 | Afloat | Favorite Female Artist | Nominated |

Asia Song Festival
| Year | Nominated work | Category | Result |
|---|---|---|---|
| 2006 | Angel's Suitcase | Favorite Artist, Mainland | Won |

Beijing Pop Music Awards
| Year | Nominated work | Category | Result |
|---|---|---|---|
| 2006 | Angel's Suitcase | Best Song of the Year | Won |
| 2006 | Angel's Suitcase | Best Female Vocal Performance | Nominated |

CCTV-MTV Music Awards
| Year | Nominated work | Category | Result |
|---|---|---|---|
| 2010 | We're All Great Directors | Best Female Vocal Performance, Mainland | Nominated |
| 2010 | We're All Great Directors | Favorite Artist, Mainland | Nominated |

Channel[V] China Music Awards
| Year | Nominated work | Category | Result |
|---|---|---|---|
| 2006 | Double | Favorite Female Artist | Won |
| 2006 | Double | Best Music Video | Won |
| 2009 | Good Man Card | Best Male & Female Duet | Won |
| 2011 | We're All Great Directors | Best Female Vocal Performance | Nominated |
| 2011 | We're All Great Directors | Favorite Female Artist | Nominated |

ERC Chinese Top Ten Awards
| Year | Nominated work | Category | Result |
|---|---|---|---|
| 2005 | Afloat | Favorite Female Artist | Nominated |
| 2005 | Gradually from Afloat | Top 10 Golden Melody | Won |
| 2005 | Gradually from Afloat | Best Music Video | Won |
| 2005 | | Best Stage Performance | Won |
| 2006 | Double | Favorite Female Artist | Won |
| 2006 | Shangguan Yan and I from Double | Top 10 Golden Melody | Won |

Metro Radio Hong Kong Hit Awards
| Year | Nominated work | Category | Result |
|---|---|---|---|
| 1999 | Swallow | Most Popular Singer | Won |

MTV Asia Awards
| Year | Nominated work | Category | Result |
|---|---|---|---|
| 2006 | Double | Favorite Artist, Mainland China | Won |

MusicRadio China Top Chart Awards
| Year | Nominated work | Category | Result |
|---|---|---|---|
| 2005 | Afloat | Favorite Female Artist | Won |
| 2005 | Gradually from Afloat | Best Song of the Year | Won |
| 2006 | Double | Favorite Female Artist | Won |
| 2006 | Shangguan Yan and I from Double | Best Song of the Year | Won |
| 2008 | Angel's Suitcase | Best Album | Won |
| 2008 | Angel's Suitcase | Best All-around Artist | Won |
| 2008 | Angle's Suitcase from Angel's Suitcase | Best Song of the Year | Won |
| 2008 | Angel's Suitcase | Best Female Artist | Nominated |
| 2008 | Angel's Suitcase | Favorite Female Artist | Nominated |
| 2010 | We're All Great Directors | Favorite Female Artist | Nominated |

RTHK Top 10 Gold Songs Awards
| Year | Nominated work | Category | Result |
|---|---|---|---|
| 1999 | Swallow | Outstanding mandarin song award | Won-Brozen |

Sprite China Original Music Chart Awards
| Year | Nominated work | Category | Result |
|---|---|---|---|
| 2005 | Afloat | Best All-round Artist | Won |
| 2005 | Afloat | Network Favorite Artist | Won |
| 2005 | Raining Sunday from Afloat | Best Song of the Year | Won |
| 2005 | Afloat | Favorite Artist | Nominated |
| 2008 | Angel's Suitcase | Best Song of the Year | Won |

Top Chinese Music Chart Awards
| Year | Nominated work | Category | Result |
|---|---|---|---|
| 2002 | Romance in the Rain | Best Theme Song of Motion Picture or Television Series | Won |
| 2005 | Afloat | Favorite Artist, Mainland China | Won |
| 2005 | Gradually from Afloat | Top 10 Golden Song of the Year | Won |
| 2005 | Rainny Sunday from Afloat | Top 10 Golden Song of the Year | Won |
| 2005 | Afloat | Best Album | Nominated |
| 2005 | Afloat | Best Female Artist, Mainland China | Nominated |
| 2006 | Double | Best Album | Nominated |
| 2006 | Double | Best Female Artist, Mainland China | Nominated |
| 2008 | Angel's Suitcase | Best Female Artist, Mainland China | Won |

TVB8 Golden Song Awards
| Year | Nominated work | Category | Result |
|---|---|---|---|
| 2000 | Magic of Love | Best Music Video | Won |
| 2005 | Afloat | Favorite Artist | Nominated |
| 2005 | Gradually from Afloat | Top 10 Golden Song of the Year | Nominated |

== Magazine recognition ==
- 2000: Rank 2 of Popular TV "Top 10 Celebrities"
- 2002: Rank 2 of FHM Singapore edition "100 Sexiest Women in the World"
- 2003: Rank 15 of FHM Singapore edition "100 Sexiest Women in the World"
- 2003: Rank 10 of FHM Thailand edition "100 Sexiest Women in the World"
- 2004: Rank 2 of FHM Singapore edition "100 Sexiest Women in the World"
- 2004: Rank 3 of FHM Thailand edition "100 Sexiest Women in the World"
- 2004: Rank 3 of Forbes China Celebrity 100
- 2004: Selected as US magazine Sirens of Cinema "International Actor of the Year"
- 2005: Rank 4 of Forbes China Celebrity 100
- 2005: Rank 15 of FHM Thailand edition "100 Sexiest Women in the World"
- 2006: Listed in People "100 Most Beautiful People"
- 2006: Rank 4 of Forbes China Celebrity 100
- 2007: Rank 7 of Forbes China Celebrity 100
- 2008: Rank 7 of Forbes China Celebrity 100
- 2013: Selected as China Screen "Actors of the Year 2012"
- 2013: Selected as Southern People Weekly "Youth Leadership of the Year"
- 2014: Selected as China Screen "Directors of the Year 2013"
- 2014: Selected as Ren Wu magazine "People of the Year 2013"
- 2015: Selected as China Screen "Actors of the Year 2014"
- 2015: Rank 7 of Forbes China Celebrity 100
- 2015: Rank 393 of New Fortune 500 Richest Chinese
- 2016: Rank 548 of Rupert Hoogewerf's China Rich List
- 2017: Selected as China Screen "Top Box Office Star"
- 2018: Rank 2545 of Rupert Hoogewerf's World Rich List
- 2018: Rank 100 of Rupert Hoogewerf's World Female Rich List who started from scratch
