= Zhao Wei discography =

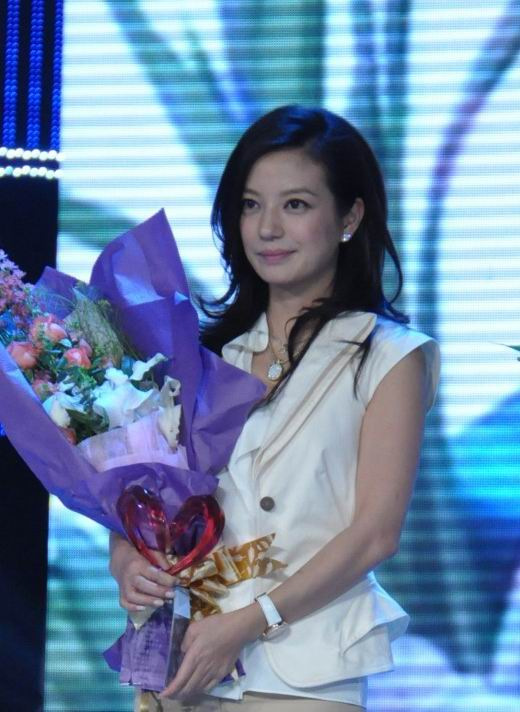
- Wei in 2011
- Studio albums: 7
- Compilation albums: 1
- Singles: 15
- Music videos: 45

The discography of Chinese actress and recording artist Zhao Wei contains seven studio albums, forty-five music videos, and a number of other appearances. In 1999, Zhao also entered the music industry and released her first album, Swallow. It included several tunes from the series My Fair Princess. The album was relatively successful and received several awards; critics commented on Zhao's potential in the music industry.

In 1999, China's Pop Songs Chart Committee presented Zhao the "Best Potential Award" for her debut album. The same year, Radio Hong Kong awarded Zhao the "Best Progress Award." Moreover, Radio Hong Kong presented Zhao an "Outstanding Mandarin Song Bronze Award" for her single "There is a Girl" (有一个姑娘). Originally, "There is a Girl" was a theme in Zhao's breakthrough series, My Fair Princess. Following Zhao's debut in the music industry, she has released several other albums. Also in 1999, Magic of Love was released. In 2001, Zhao released the album The Last Separation, based on her recent breakup with her boyfriend. Zhao's first three albums sold well in China, selling over 3 million copies, but received a lukewarm response from critics. As part of the soundtrack for Romance in the Rain, Zhao performed several songs written by Chiung Yao. In the actual television series, Zhao's character, Lu Yiping, also performed many songs.

After taking a three-year break from singing to focus on her acting work, in 2004 Zhao released the album Piao (飄), meaning "flutter." Zhao recorded this album in hopes of coping with the rumours about her. Fans and critics alike feel Zhao's new album shows a more mature and expressive singing technique. Included in the album were hits such as "Jian Jian" and "Continuous Rainy Sunday." Following the release of Piao, Zhao's music career flourished. At the 12th East Music Awards, Zhao won the Best Stage Performance Award. Furthermore, at the 5th Pepsi Music Chart Awards, Zhao was selected as Mainland's Most Popular Female Singer.

Following the success of Piao, Zhao released another album titled Double (双). This album included the popular hits "One Tiny Part" (微小的部分)and "Shangguan Yan and I" (我和上官燕). It also included "Faxian" (发现; literally "Realize"), based on the theme song of Moment in Peking. The success of Double resulted in Zhao winning "Most Popular Female Artist" at the 13th ERS Golden Song Awards and Music Radio Awards.

Her music career is highlighted by her wins in the Channel V's 12th Chinese Music Billboard Event in 2006. Zhao won awards for Most Popular Female Artist and Most Popular Music Video for her music video "Shangguan Yan and I." Zhao was also awarded MTV Asia's Favourite Artist from Mainland China. Her seventh album Angel's Suitcase was crowned the Best Female Vocal Performance and Best Album.

== Albums ==
=== Studio albums ===
Title	Album details	Peak chart positions		Sales
Title	Album details	HK	TWN	Sales
Swallow (小燕子-飞跃时空的精灵)	Released: 26 March 1999; Label: EMI; Formats: CD, cassette, digital download	3	2	TWN: 100,000
Magic of Love (爱情大魔咒)	Released: 12 October 1999; Label: EMI; Formats: CD, cassette, digital download	6	—	TWN: 50,000; HK: 50,000
The Last Separation (最后一次分手)	Released: 20 June 2001; Label: Avex; Formats: CD, cassette, digital download	—	—	
Afloat (飘)	Released: 22 November 2004; Label: Virgin; Formats: CD, cassette, digital download	—	—	CHN: 300,000
Double (双)	Released: 22 July 2005; Label: Virgin; Formats: CD, cassette, digital download	—	—	CHN: 220,000
Angel's Suitcase (天使旅行箱)	Released: 3 September 2007; Label: MBOX; Formats: CD, cassette, digital download	—	—	
We're All Great Directors (我们都是大导演)	Released: 7 August 2009; Label: MBOX; Formats: Digital download	—	—	

=== Compilation albums ===
Title	Album details
Zhao Wei's Music Video Compilation (百变赵薇MV精选)	Released: 28 May 2006; Label: Virgin; Formats: DVD

=== Soundtracks ===
Title	Album details
My Fair Princess Soundtrack	Released: 9 June 1999; Label: Avex; Formats: CD, cassette
Romance in the Rain Soundtrack	Released: 28 March 2001; Label: Avex; Formats: CD, cassette
Chinese Odyssey 2002 Soundtrack	Released: 14 February 2002; Label: EMI; Formats: CD, cassette
Moment in Peking Soundtrack	Released: 7 October 2005; Label: Virgin; Formats: CD, cassette

== Singles ==
Title	Year	Album
"Bo Lang Gu" (拨浪鼓)	1999	Swallow
"True Heart" (真心不假)	1999	Swallow
"Magic of Love" (爱情大魔咒)	1999	Magic of Love
"Er Dong" (耳洞)	1999	Magic of Love
"The Last Separation" (最后一次分手)	2001	The Last Separation
"Gradually" (渐渐)	2004	Afloat
"Raining Sunday" (一直下雨的星期天)	2004	Afloat
"Wo He Shangguan" (我和上官燕)	2005	Double
"Wei Xiao De Bu Fen" (微小的部分)	2005	Double
"Angel's Suitcase" (天使旅行箱)	2007	Angel's Suitcase
"Cha Cha Love" (恰恰爱)	2007	Angel's Suitcase
"Shu Ye de Chong Bai" (树叶的崇拜)	2007	Angel's Suitcase
"We're All Great Directors" (我们都是大导演)	2009	We're All Great Directors
"Shi Jian Ting Le" (时间停了)	2011	Non-album singles
"Jiang Cheng Zi" (江城子)	2011	Non-album singles
"Magnolia" (木兰香)	2011	Non-album singles

== Other appearances ==
Besides studio albums and soundtracks, Zhao Wei sang a number of promo songs, TV shows or movie theme songs which didn't appear on any album or soundtracks.

Year	Song	Notes
2000	"Because of You" (为你)	Lyric is written by Zhao Wei, ending theme song of her 2000 swordgirl style television series Treasure Venture.
2001	"Young Beijing" (青春北京) (with Chen Luyu, Wang Xiaoya, Xu Gehui etc.)	Theme song of World University Games.
2004	"Warm" (温暖) (with Adu)	Special Song for 2004 CCTV New Year's Gala
2006	"Don't Let Me Go" (不要把我的手放开)	Ending theme song of her 2006 television series Fast Track Love.
2007	"At This Time" (这一次)	Theme song of her 2007 television series Thank You for Having Loved Me.
2007	"Messenger of Love" (爱的使者)	Ending theme song of CCTV animated series Fuwa.(2008 Beijing Olympic Games official promotional cartoon).
2007	"City's Face" (城市的脸) (with Li Quan)	Top 10 official selected promo song of 2010 World Expo.
2008	"Love a City, Love a Nation" (倾国倾城)	Theme song of CCTV TV Show "Love a City, Love a Nation"(倾国倾城).
2008	"Goodman Card" (好人卡) (with Huang Xiaoming)	Single of Huang Xiaoming.
2009	"Lighting Heart" (把心照亮) (with Chen Yifan)	Theme song of CCTV TV Show "Charity China" second season.
2009	"Later Sunny" (晚晴) (with Li Quan)	Ending theme song of her 2009 based on novel television series A Lady's Epic.
2011	"Dream Comes True" (夢想成真)	Theme song of the 20th Golden Rooster and Hundred Flowers Film Festival.
2012	"Beijing Bless You" (北京祝福你) (with Jackie Chan, Li Bingbing etc.)	China promo song of the London Olympic Games.
2014	"Dear Child" (亲爱的小孩) (with Huang Bo, Tong Dawei, Hao Lei, Zhang Yi)	Theme song of the film Dearest.
2015	"The Left Ear" (左耳)	Theme song of the film The Left Ear.
2016	"Six Feet Lane" (六尺巷)	Special Song for 2016 CCTV New Year's Gala
2017	"Chinese Restaurant" (中餐厅) (with Huang Xiaoming)	Theme Song for reality show Chinese Restaurant season 1
2018	"Chinese Restaurant" (中餐厅) (with Alec Su)	Theme Song for reality show Chinese Restaurant season 2
2018	"Higher Animals" (高等动物) (with Huang Bo, Xu Zheng, Lou Ye, Guan Hu, Cao Baoping, Tang Wei, Xin Yukun, Wen Muye, Degena, Zhang Dalei etc.)	Theme Song for the 12th Xining FIRST International Film Festival

== Music videos ==
Title	Year	Director(s)	Album
"Swallow"	1999	Lin Jinhe	Swallow
"True Heart Not Fake"	1999	Lin Jinhe	Swallow
"Sha La La"	1999	Lin Jinhe	Swallow
"Wheel"	1999	Lin Jinhe	Swallow
"Letter in Battle"	1999	Lin Jinhe	Swallow
"Saturday Night"	1999	Lin Jinhe	Swallow
"Bo Lang Gu"	1999	Lin Jinhe	Swallow
"Story in the Rain"	1999	Lin Jinhe	Swallow
"Magic of Love"	1999	Lin Bingcun	Magic of Love
"Playing"	1999	Lin Bingcun	Magic of Love
"Earting Hole"	1999	Lin Bingcun	Magic of Love
"Whether"	1999	Lin Bingcun	Magic of Love
"I Won't Cry"	1999	Lin Bingcun	Magic of Love
"E-mail Love"	1999	Lin Bingcun	Magic of Love
"Hello"	1999	Lin Bingcun	Magic of Love
"Love A Cat"	1999	Lin Bingcun	Magic of Love
"Last Separation"	2001	Lin Jinhe	Last Separation
"Love is Fabulous"	2001	Lin Jinhe	Last Separation
"Tide"	2001	Lin Jinhe	Last Separation
"Can't Help"	2001	Lin Jinhe	Last Separation
"Gradually"	2004	Lin Jinhe	Afloat
"Changed"	2004	Lin Jinhe	Afloat
"Never End Shakespeares"	2004	Lin Jinhe	Afloat
"November"	2004	Lin Jinhe	Afloat
"Raining Sunday"	2004	Lin Jinhe	Afloat
"Name of Angel"	2004	Huo Jianqi	Afloat
"Shangguan Yan and I"	2005	Jin Zhuo	Double
"A Tiny Part"	2005	Kwuang Sheng	Double
"Better Tomorrow"	2005	Lin Jinhe	Double
"Emotion Should Laugh at Me"	2005	Lin Jinhe	Double
"Who is More Important?"	2005	Lin Jinhe	Double
"Realize"	2005	Lin Jinhe	Double
"Angel's Suitcase"	2007	Zhao Wei	Angel's Suitcase
"Cha Cha Love"	2007	Lin Jinhe	Angel's Suitcase
"Love Yourself More"	2007	Lin Jinhe	Angel's Suitcase
"Leaves Admire"	2007	Lin Jinhe	Angel's Suitcase
"We're All Great Directors"	2011	Lin Jinhe	We're All Great Directors
"Time Ceased"	2011	Lin Jinhe	We're All Great Directors
"Mulan Scent"	2011	Lin Jinhe	We're All Great Directors
