= Aiqing Da Mozhou =

愛情大魔咒 or 爱情大魔咒 is a Chinese character for a word or morpheme literally Big Spell of Love.

It may refer to:

- Magic of Love (album), 1999 album by singer Zhao Wei
- Magical Love, 2002 Taiwanese television series
