= Fast Track Love =

- Created by: Patrick Yau
- Starring: Zhao Wei; Lu Yi; Lee Wei; An Yixuan
- Countries of origin: China; Taiwan
- No. of episodes: 25

Production
- Running time: 45 mins per episode

Original release
- Network: Liaoning TV (China)/Formosa Television (Taiwan)
- Release: August 16, 2006 – September 2006

Fast Track Love (simplified Chinese: 车神; traditional Chinese: 車神; lit. God of Race Car) is a Chinese drama television series co-produced by mainland China and Taiwan. This is the first car-race series in mainland China. Zhao Wei and Lu Yi was a screen couple in A Time to Love. It was shown on television in the following countries and regions: mainland China, Taiwan, Hong Kong, Macau, Malaysia, Vietnam, Thailand and Philippines.

== Cast ==
- Chen Xiaoxiao, played by Zhao Wei
- Zhang Jiaxiang, played by Lu Yi
- Ouyang Qian, played by An Yixuan
- Huo Juncong, played by Lee Wai
- Liu Yunsong, played by Qiao Zhenyu

== International broadcast ==
Country or Region	Network	Premiere	Title
China	Liaoning Television	2006	车神
Hong Kong	Mei Ah TV	2008	極速愛戀
Thailand	True Film Asia	2007	
Taiwan	FTV TV	2009	車神

== Soundtrack ==
mainland Edition:

- Ending Theme Song: Don't Let Me Go (Chinese Title: 不要把我的手放开) performed by Zhao Wei

Taiwan Edition:

- Opening Theme Song: White Hair (Chinese Title: 白頭鬃) performed by Zeng Xinmei
- Ending Theme Song: The Secret (Chinese Title: 不能講的秘密) performed by Weng Panfei
