= Penitentiary Angel =

Penitentiary Angel (or: Behind the Wall of Shame)
- Film poster
- Directed by: Xie Jin
- Written by: Zhou Jianping
- Starring: Zhao Wei
- Cinematography: Lü Yue
- Distributed by: Shanghai Film Studio
- Release date: 8 November 1995 (Shanghai International Film Festival)
- Running time: 105 minutes
- Country: China
- Language: Mandarin

Penitentiary Angel (Chinese: 女儿谷) (also known as Behind the Wall of Shame), is a 1994 Chinese drama film starring Zhao Wei and directed by Jin Xie. The film was adapted from the same name novel. Official selection of 1995 UN's Women Conference.

== Cast ==
- Ding Jinger, played by Zhao Wei
- La-La Chiu
- Tsui-Wan Lee
- Tung Yin Liu
- Ching Ping Lo
- Ling-Yan Ma

== Awards and nominations ==
Beijing Student Film Festival

- Won: Special Honor Award
