= Swallow (Zhao Wei album) =

Studio album by Zhao Wei
- Released: 26 March 1999
- Genre: Mandopop
- Label: Avex

Zhao Wei chronology
| Swallow (1999) | Magic of Love (1999) |

Swallow (Chinese: 小燕子-飞跃时空的精灵) is Zhao Wei's first album. The title sourced Zhao's first acclaimed role - Xiaoyanzi (小燕子; "Swallow") in My Fair Princess. On its first day of release, this album sold 100,000 copies in Taiwan.

== Track listing ==
1. You Yi Ge Gu Niang (There's a Girl)
2. Bo Lang Gu (Wave Drum)
3. Sha La La
4. Bu Neng He Ni Fen Shou (Can't Break up With You)
5. Saturday Night
6. Zhen Xin Bu Jia (True Heart)
7. Chi Lun (Gear)
8. Zi Cong You Le Ni (Ever Since I had You)
9. Ping Zhong Xing 瓶中信(Message in a Bottle)
10. Yu Zhong De Gu Shi (Rain Season's Story)
11. Pump Wave Drum 搏浪鼓 [Kala]
12. Can't Break Up With You 不能和你分手 [Kala](Instrumental)

Tracks 1, 8 and 12 were from My Fair Princess

== Awards and nominations ==
Radio Hong Kong Station Awards

- Won: Favorite New Artist
- Won: Favorite Artist-Bronze Prize

Metro Radio Station Awards

- Won: Favorite Artist

China Pop Music Chart Committee Special Awards

- Won: Best Potential Artist
