= Zhao Wei =

Chinese actress, singer and filmmaker (born 1976)

- 赵薇
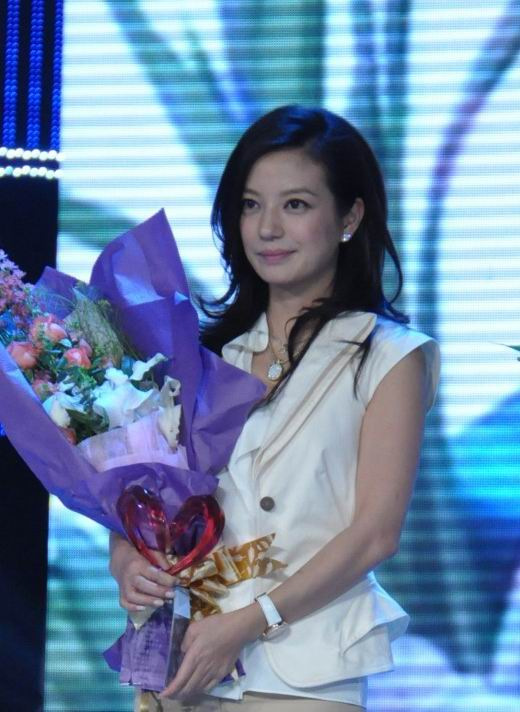
- Zhao in 2011
- Born: 12 March 1976 (age 50); Wuhu, Anhui, China
- Other names: Wei Zhao; Vicki Zhao; Vicky Zhao
- Education: Beijing Film Academy (MFA)
- Occupations: Actress; filmmaker; singer
- Years active: 1994–2021
- Spouse: Huang Youlong (m. 2008; div. 2021)
- Children: 1
- Awards: See list
- Musical career
- Genre: Mandopop

Chinese name
- Traditional Chinese: 趙薇
- Simplified Chinese: 赵薇
Transcriptions
Standard Mandarin
- Hanyu Pinyin: Zhào Wēi
- IPA: [ʈʂâʊ wéɪ]
Yue: Cantonese
- Jyutping: Ziu^{6} Mei^{4}

Zhao Wei (simplified Chinese: 赵薇; traditional Chinese: 趙薇; pinyin: Zhào Wēi; born 12 March 1976), also known as Vicky or Vicki Zhao, is a Chinese actress, singer, filmmaker, and businesswoman. Regarded as one of China's Four Dan actresses, she rose to fame for her role in the television series My Fair Princess (1998–1999), followed by popular dramas and films such as Romance in the Rain (2001) and Shaolin Soccer (2001), Moment in Peking (2005), Painted Skin (2008), Mulan (2009), and Tiger Mom (2015). For her performance in Dearest (2014), Zhao won the Hong Kong Film Award for Best Actress.

Zhao made her directorial debut with So Young (2013), which is a commercial and critical success. She is also a singer with 7 albums and the second largest shareholder of Alibaba Pictures. Zhao ranked 80th on Forbes China Celebrity 100 list in 2013, 22nd in 2014, 7th in 2015, and 28th in 2017.

Since 27 August 2021, Zhao has been blacklisted by the Chinese government, with most content featuring her removed from the Chinese Internet.

== Early life ==
Born and brought up in Wuhu, Anhui, Zhao is the second child to Zhao Jiahai (Chinese: 赵家海; pinyin: Zhào Jiāhǎi), an engineer, and Wei Qiying (Chinese: 魏启颖; pinyin: Wèi Qǐyǐng), a primary school teacher. She has an elder brother, Zhao Jian (Chinese: 赵健; pinyin: Zhào Jiān; born 1969), who is her business partner and a major shareholder of production company Talent Television & Film. Zhao Jian's ex-wife Chen Rong (Chinese: 陈蓉; pinyin: Chén Róng), whom he divorced in 2017, used to be Zhao's manager.

Zhao attended Wuhu Normal School Affiliated Primary School for her elementary education, Wuhu No. 17 Middle School for junior high, and Wuhu Normal School, a secondary specialized school. After graduating from Wuhu Normal School in 1994, she enrolled in the Xie Jin Heng Tong Star Academy of Performing Arts (now the Xie Jin Film & Television Art College of Shanghai Normal University) as part of its first cohort of students. In 1996, she was admitted to the Beijing Film Academy with the highest entrance examination score in the country. She graduated in 2000 with a bachelor's degree in performing arts, earning a score of 90 out of 100 on her graduation thesis.

== Career ==
=== Early career (1994–1997) ===
In 1993, while Zhao was a student at Wuhu Normal School, the movie A Soul Haunted by Painting (1994), directed by Huang Shuqin, starring Gong Li and Derek Yee, was filming in Wuhu. Zhao was cast in the role of a young prostitute in the brothel where Gong's character worked, her first acting experience. She appeared briefly at the beginning of the film and had no dialogue.

Zhao developed a strong interest in acting after this first experience, and decided to become an actress. In 1994, after graduating from the Wuhu Normal School, she gave up her job as an apprentice pre-school teacher. She moved from her hometown to Shanghai and enrolled in the Shanghai Xie Jin-Hengtong Star Academy, an acting school founded by the Chinese director Xie Jin, where she received acting training during 1994–1995. She was also selected by Xie to star in his movie Penitentiary Angel (1996), her first major role. "I am too young to understand the role," she said about her working experience with Xie, "but if you've been cast in a film by a famous director, no matter how well you did, other less-famous directors will also want to cast you." The film landed her other roles in TV series including her first leading role in Sisters in Beijing (1996).

=== Rise to stardom (1998–2001) ===
In 1997, novelist and producer Chiung Yao was casting the TV series My Fair Princess, a joint production by mainland China and Taiwan adapted from Chiung Yao's own novel. She identified Zhao as a talent after watching Sisters in Beijing and offered Zhao the title role of Huan Zhu Ge Ge (Princess Pearl) a.k.a. Xiao Yanzi ("Little Swallow"), a rebellious and funny princess who dared to challenge authority and rules in the palace. Filming the series was an arduous task for Zhao and her co-stars; Zhao herself acknowledged the intensity of filming:

We shot 18 to 20 hours a day. There were two groups of actors. One shot during the day, one at night. Frequently I'd have to do both. A few times I worked so hard that I actually threw up from the exertion. But I was young then. I didn't get tired easily. And I never complained about the working conditions. I thought that's just how it was supposed to be. Now I know that's wrong. But at the time I had no clue. Whatever they'd give me, I'd do. And as soon as I was done working I could just fall asleep. They'd say, "Go to sleep", and I'd go right to sleep.

The hard work of the cast yielded unexpected results. This comedic period drama quickly became a phenomenal sensation and swept TV ratings in Taiwan, mainland China, Hong Kong and Southeast Asian countries such as Singapore and Vietnam. Zhao rose to prominence and became a household name overnight. In 1999, she became the youngest actress to win the Golden Eagle Award for Best Actress. She is regarded by many as mainland China's first "national idol", and was named one of Taiwan's "Top Ten Most Outstanding Individuals in Television". However, alongside the phenomenal success were increasingly negative critics in mainland China, attacking the rebellious role as a "bad influence" over children. During the Chinese People's Political Consultative Conference (CPPCC) in 2002, a member of the CPPCC submitted a proposal to boycott the "little swallow". Zhao once again worked with Chiung Yao for the 2001 television series Romance in the Rain, a costume drama set in the 1930s and 1940s. In this series, Zhao played a vengeful girl who tried to exact revenge against her parents. The series was a commercial success, and recorded the highest ratings of the year.

Zhao soon felt that she had achieved all she could in television and began to shift her career focus from TV to films.

=== Film (2001–2010) ===
Zhao went on to star in a few Hong Kong movies. In 2001, she starred in the comedy film Shaolin Soccer alongside Hong Kong actor and director Stephen Chow. Zhao played an ugly-duckling steamed bun-maker-cum-tai chi-master, a great contrast from the glamorous image she had established for herself in previous roles. Zhao was nominated at the Chinese Film Media Awards for Best Actress. This was followed by a supporting role in Chinese Odyssey 2002 as "Phoenix", for which she was nominated Golden Horse Award for Best Supporting Actress. In 2002, Zhao played an assassin in So Close, which also stars Shu Qi and Karen Mok.

In 2003, Zhao starred in four films: My Dream Girl, Warriors of Heaven and Earth, Green Tea, and Jade Goddess of Mercy. After much speculation over who was cast for the female lead An Xin in Ann Hui's film Jade Goddess of Mercy, the role was finally offered to Zhao, and her performance was well received by critics. In 2004, the Chinese Association of Film Performing Arts presented her the Golden Phoenix Award for this role. She was also nominated at the 27th Hundred Flowers Award for Best Actress for her performance in Warriors of Heaven and Earth. In 2004, Zhao was cast to dub the character Princess Fiona for when Shrek 2 was released in China.

The year 2005 proved to be another successful year for Zhao. She won the Golden Goblet Award for Best Actress at the Shanghai International Film Festival and tied with Zhang Ziyi for the Huabiao Award. Both awards were for her performance in A Time to Love. Zhao once again won Best Actress for the film at the 8th Changchun Film Festival in 2006.

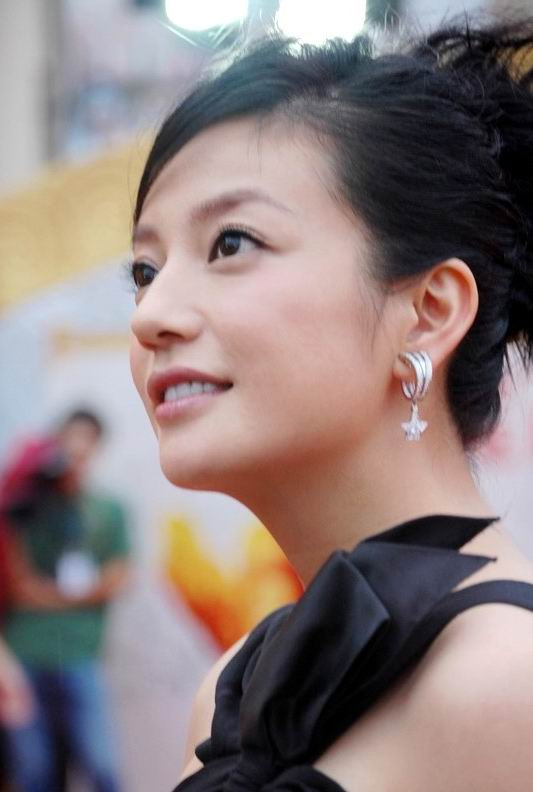
Zhao at 2007 Huabiao Award red carpet

After a four-year break from television series, Zhao starred as Yao Mulan in a remake of Lin Yutang's Moment in Peking (2005). The television series became Zhao's fourth TV drama (after My Fair Princess, My Fair Princess 2 and Romance in the Rain) to become the highest rated drama of the year. Zhao was nominated at the 26th Flying Apsaras Awards for Outstanding Actress.

Following the success of Moment in Peking, Zhao starred in The Postmodern Life of My Aunt, which premiered at film festivals around the world, including the Toronto International Film Festival. Though Zhao only appeared for ten minutes in the film, her performance led her to be nominated at the 43rd Golden Horse Awards and the 27th Hong Kong Film Awards for Best Supporting Actress.

In 2006, Zhao made a surprising move by sitting for the national entrance exam for postgraduate studies. After passing, Zhao returned to her alma mater, the Beijing Film Academy (BFA) in September 2006 as a postgraduate student in the Department of Film Directing, where she studied under director Tian Zhuangzhuang. That year, Zhao was ranked No. 4 on Forbes' 2006 China Celebrity 100 list. She was selected as the "Most Beautiful Woman" in China through a national vote by Sina.com & Sohu.com's users. People magazine also listed Zhao as "100 Most Beautiful People" in 2006. Zhao then portrayed a cabby in the 2007 film The Longest Night in Shanghai, starring alongside Masahiro Motoki and Dylan Kuo. The same year, Zhao starred in the television series Thank You for Having Loved Me. She reportedly received a salary of 100,000 yuan per episode.

From 2008 to 2009, Zhao starred in John Woo's historical epic Red Cliff. Set in the Three Kingdoms period, the film is mainland China's most expensive production then. She played Sun Shangxiang, the independent-minded sister of warlord Sun Quan, who disguises herself as a male enemy soldier to gather intelligence. Zhao received two nominations at the Hong Kong Film Award for Best Supporting Actress. She next appeared in Gordon Chan's horror-adventure film Painted Skin (2008). The film set a new milestone in Chinese film by grossing 100 million yuan in six days. Zhao's role as a general's wife was particularly acclaimed, and she received Best Actress nominations at the 27th Golden Rooster Award and 3rd Asian Film Award. In 2009, Zhao played the legendary character Hua Mulan in Jingle Ma's Mulan. Ma called Zhao the "perfect fit" for the cross-dressing heroine. Zhao won the Best Actress Award at the 10th Changchun Film Festival, 30th Hundred Flowers Awards and 19th Shanghai Film Critics Awards for her performance in the film. On 6 August 2009, she was elected vice-president of the China Film Performance Art Academy and executive member of the council of the China Environmental Society. After filming the wuxia film 14 Blades alongside Donnie Yen, starting in mid-2010, Zhao took a two-year break from acting. On 11 April 2010, she gave birth to a girl, Huang Xin, the only child of her and businessman Huang Youlong, whom she married in 2008.

In June 2010, she returned to the limelight as a jury member of the 13th Shanghai International Film Festival.

=== Comeback and directing (2012–2021) ===
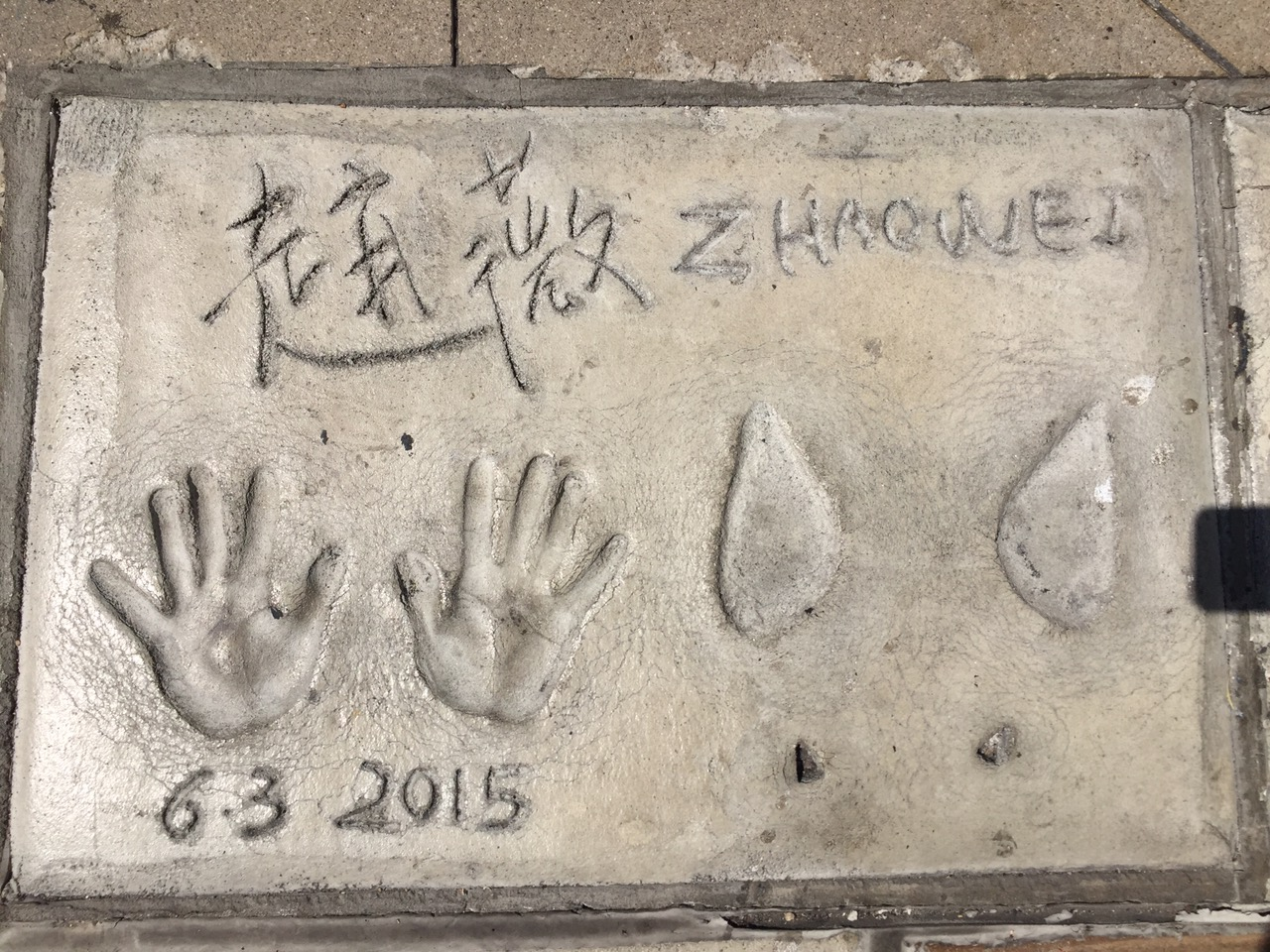
On 3 June 2015, Zhao became the first ever Chinese actress to have left her hand-prints and footprints at the TCL Chinese Theatre in Hollywood.

Zhao returned from her extended parental leave in 2012, playing, incidentally, a single mother in Love, directed by Doze Niu. The film also achieved commercial success, and became the only film to gross 100 million yuan in both Taiwan and mainland China. Critics call the solo performance of Zhao as "the most amazing scene". The same year she starred in Painted Skin: The Resurrection, the sequel to the 2008 film Painted Skin. The film grossed over 700 million yuan to become the highest grossing Chinese film then, before being beaten by Lost in Thailand.

In 2012, she graduated from the directing institute of Beijing Film Academy, with an MFA dissertation defense score of 99/100, ranking No. 1 out of all the graduates.

Her directorial debut, So Young, opened on 26 April 2013 to 141 million yuan in its first weekend. She is the first female director whose debut film broke 100 million yuan in China. In just one week, So Young garnered 350 million yuan, with the final box office record in China being over 700 million yuan. For the film, Zhao won the Golden Rooster Award for Best Directorial Debut, Hundred Flowers Award for Best Director and Hong Kong Film Award for Best Film from Mainland and Taiwan.

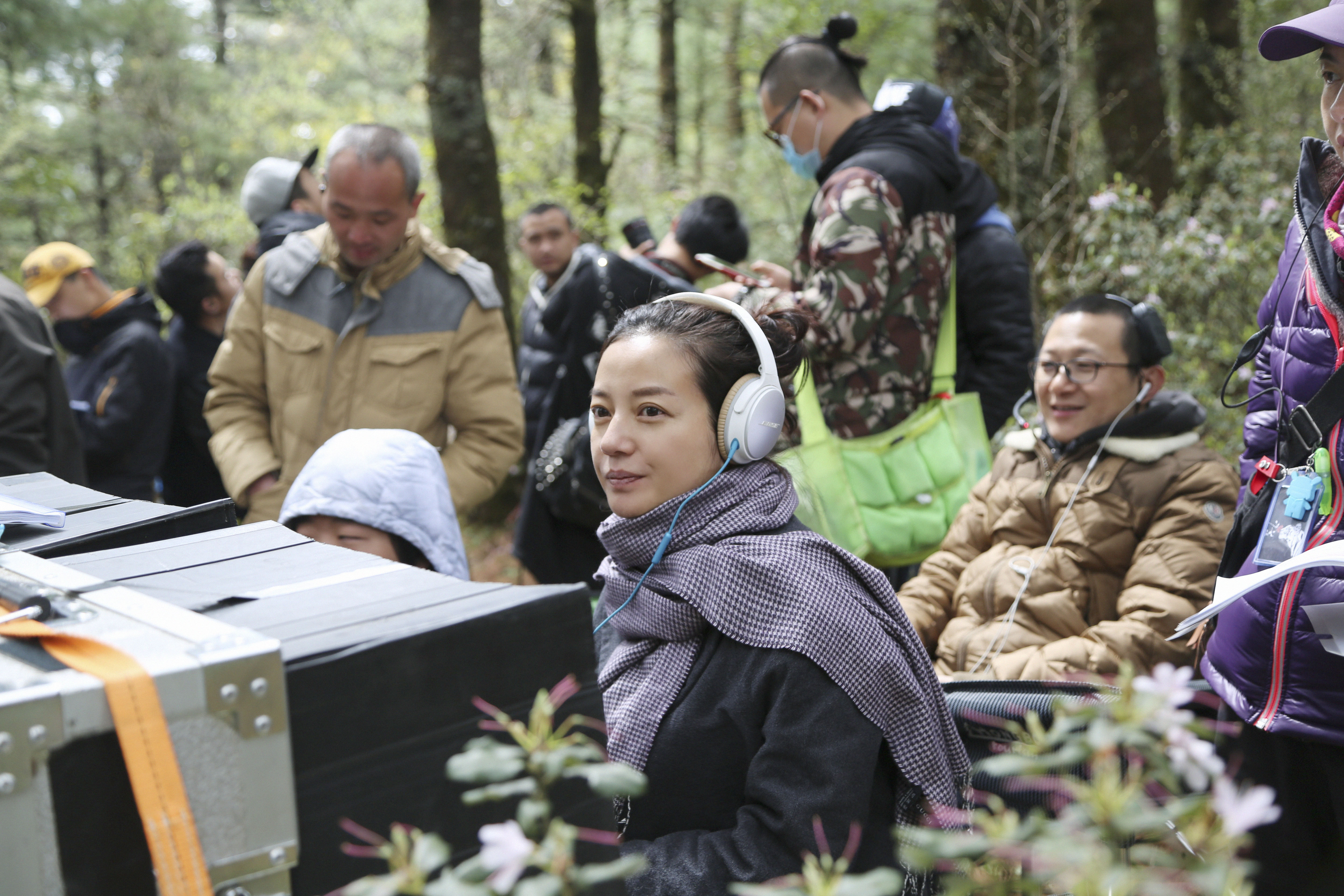
Production still. On 8 April 2016, director Zhao (center) filming her second feature.

Zhao also became a judge for the 5th season of China's Got Talent alongside Liu Ye, Alec Su and Wang Wei Chun.

Zhao returned to acting in 2014, playing a countrywoman in the film Dearest, directed by Peter Chan. The movie was selected by the 71st Venice International Film Festival in the out-of-competition category, and Zhao's performance as a foster mother of a kidnapped child received international acclaim. The Hollywood Reporter called her the Chinese Juliette Binoche. This movie also earned Zhao the Hong Kong Film Award and Hong Kong Film Critics Society Award for Best Actress.

In 2015, she starred in the comedies Hollywood Adventures and Lost in Hong Kong, both of which were commercially successful. Forbes described Zhao as the "world's wealthiest working actress". The same year, Zhao made her return to television in Tiger Mom. She was nominated at the Asian Television Award and Magnolia Award for Best Actress in a Television Series. On 20 October, Zhao was elected as executive member of Executive Committee of China Film Directors' Guild.

In 2016, Zhao played a doctor in Johnnie To's crime thriller film Three. She also began the production for her second directorial work No Other Love. In July, she was a member of the main competition jury for the 73rd Venice International Film Festival.

In February 2017, Zhao went back to her alma mater – School of Performing Arts, Beijing Film Academy – to be the finale round examiner/assessor of applicants for the 2017 intake. In September, she was named as a member of the main competition jury for the 30th Tokyo International Film Festival.

In March 2018, Zhao was a member of the finale-round jury for the 9th China Film Directors Guild Award. She was also appointed as official spokesperson of the 12th Xining FIRST International Film Festival. On 17 Oct, CCTV announced Zhao as the chief director of the documentary Starlight, presented by China Movie Channel.

As the protagonist Catherine, Zhao made her stage debut in a public theater production adapted from David Auburn's 2001 Broadway play Proof, directed by Tian Zhuangzhuang. The play opened in Beijing at the Tianqiao Art Center on 23 January 2019 to critical acclaim.

=== Blacklisted (2021–present) ===
On 27 August 2021, all films and television dramas featuring Zhao disappeared from Chinese video streaming services like Tencent Video and iQiyi. No explanation was given, but it was later suggested that the decision stemmed from her ex-husband's alleged ties to disgraced official Sun Lijun.

On 28 August 2021, Zhao was reported to have left China for France, where she owned the Château Monlot. In a later deleted Instagram post from 29 August, Zhao claimed she was in Beijing, denying that she was in France. On 12 September, Zhao commented "Happy birthday" on director Queena Li's Weibo, before the comment was either deleted or hidden. On 14 September, photos of Zhao at a telecom customer service center in her hometown, Wuhu, surfaced online, with claims she had visited the center the previous day. However, some internet users speculated that the photos might have been taken earlier, as the center's staff were not wearing masks, which were generally required in China during the COVID-19 pandemic. In December 2021, Zhao was seen in Hong Kong. In June 2022, Zhao revealed on Instagram Stories that her father had died. In the following years, she posted only occasionally on Instagram, which is banned in China, while sporadic updates about her appeared on Weibo through associates and fans.

From February 2024, some Chinese video and social media platforms began partially lifting restrictions on her content. Zhao's Weibo profile once again displayed her works Painted Skin and My Fair Princess, and Douban restored her photos. Videos on Bilibili featuring Zhao were no longer blurred, and streaming platforms restored the television drama Records of Kangxi's Travel Incognito 2, in which she plays a role in one of the multi-episode story arcs. However, a significant amount of her content remained censored or removed, and her other film and music works were not yet restored.

In April 2024, the Beijing Fourth Intermediate People's Court froze the shares of Zhao's company, He Bao Entertainment Group Co., Ltd., totaling 5 million RMB. The freeze remains in effect until 10 April 2027. Zhao, who had been a shareholder in as many as 17 companies spanning industries, kept only one studio under her name by June 2024, with her investment and business footprint significantly reduced. In August, Douban allowed searches for her name again.

Zhao's Weibo account remained inactive for more than three years until 4 December 2024, when she posted a tribute to Chiung Yao, the showrunner of My Fair Princess, who had died by suicide earlier that day. Zhao's return to Weibo trended on the platform's hotlist until the main hashtag was removed. On 28 December, Zhao's divorce announcement trended on the hotlist, without the hashtag being removed. Hunan Economic Television, the original mainland Chinese producer and broadcaster of My Fair Princess before merging into Hunan Television as a subsidiary channel, held its New Year's Eve Gala as an offline event at Changsha Window of the World, featuring footage of Zhao from the show on a large screen on stage.

On 17 December 2025, Zhao appeared via a phone call in the Taobao livestream room of her winery, Château Monlot. On the night of 30 December, she appeared on camera in the same livestream room before the stream was taken down for approximately ten minutes. Zhao later stated in a fan club chat group that she would refrain from participating in similar livestreams in the future.

In March 2026, No Other Love, a film Zhao had directed ten years earlier, was released under a new Chinese title, Feng Mi De Zhen (Chinese: 蜂蜜的针; lit. 'The Honey Sting'), with its English title unchanged but the director credit altered from Zhao to producer Yuan Mei.

== Other works ==
=== Investments ===
Zhao and her then-husband Huang Youlong, whom she has since divorced, invested nearly HKD 3.1 billion to acquire shares in Alibaba Pictures in 2014, becoming the company's second-largest shareholder.

Zhao's company had been planning to acquire Zhejiang Sunriver Culture Co since late 2016, when it was then named Zhejiang Wanjia Co, a Shanghai-listed company. The acquisition fell through after Xiao Jianhua, Zhao's main financier, was abducted from Hong Kong to mainland China. The China Securities Regulatory Commission later found that Zhao and her company had violated disclosure rules by announcing and playing up merger and acquisition intentions at a time when they lacked sufficient resources, or support from financial institutions, for such a deal, "seriously misleading the market with fake information". Zhao and her then-husband have been barred from China's securities markets for five years and were given a 300,000 yuan ($45,180) fine each.

=== Winery ===
Zhao is a wine lover and has developed a passion for winemaking. On 21 December 2011, she finalised the purchase of the Château Monlot, a Saint-Émilion Grand Cru vineyard in France, for €4 million. On 16 September 2012, Zhao was admitted into the Jurade de Saint-Émilion. Following four years of work, Zhao launched the Bordeaux wine brand in the Chinese mass market in October 2015. The online shop offers both high end and affordable wine selections. Since her purchase of Château Monlot, she has expanded her wine interests in France by purchasing the nine-hectare Patarabet vineyard in AOC Saint-Émilion, the 57-hectare Senailhac vineyard in Entre-Deux-Mers, and on 29 March 2019, the 12-hectare Château La Croix de la Roche vineyard in AOC Fronsac and Bordeaux. The Château La Croix de la Roche has an annual potential production of 82,000 bottles and is Zhao's first certified organic property. It was purchased from Isabelle Maurin, who had owned the château since 1982, and sold it due to lack of a family member willing to take over the property.

== Personal life ==
=== Relationships ===
Zhao's first boyfriend is actor Fan Yulin. The two were among the first batch of students at the Xie Jin-Hengtong Star Academy in 1994. However, in 1996, Zhao was admitted to the Beijing Film Academy, and the couple eventually parted ways due to the long-distance nature of their relationship. In 1999, when Zhao was answering a hotline interview for a Beijing newspaper, she was asked about romantic rumors with Fan. She dismissed the rumors and accused Fan of using her name for publicity. Fan sued Zhao for defamation, but later dropped the lawsuit.

In 1997, Zhao's Beijing Film Academy classmate Huang Xiaoming, who had a crush on her, confessed his feelings but was rejected.

From 1996 to 2000, Zhao was in a four-year relationship with Chinese-Australian businessman Ye Maoqing, the son of property tycoon Ye Lipei. During their relationship, several actresses, including Kristy Yang, Irene Wang, and Lee Ting-yee, were rumored to have been involved with Ye, with Yang admitting to a six-month relationship in 1997 before learning that he was seeing Zhao. In early 2001, Zhao confirmed their breakup, citing fatigue with Ye's domineering personality. However, according to a 2020 ruling by the Shanghai No. 1 Intermediate People's Court in the insider trading case of Ye's partner, Cheng Yanxian, with whom he had children, Ye and Cheng had begun their relationship in 1999.

On Christmas Eve 2002, Zhao was photographed with David Wu at a Shanghai nightclub, where they were seen kissing on the dance floor and later in a nearby park. However, both denied being in a relationship.

In November 2003, Zhao was reported to be dating Wang Yu, son of Chinese politician Wang Daohan. The couple's relationship was confirmed in July 2004 when photos of them vacationing in Hong Kong surfaced. On 11 April 2005, Zhao and Wang attended the funeral of artist Chen Yifei together. By July of that year, Wang was photographed holding hands with actress Huang Yi at a bar. Zhao admitted to her breakup with Wang at the end of July.

From 2006 to 2007, according to paparazzo Zhuo Wei, Zhao was in a relationship with table tennis player Wang Liqin, which both parties denied.

=== Marriage ===
In 2007, Zhao was introduced to the Chinese-born Singaporean businessman Huang Youlong (黄有龙) through Wang Lin, a self-styled qigong master and later exposed fraudster who had extensive connections among Chinese celebrities. In December 2008, Zhao and Huang married in Singapore, where she obtained permanent residency through their marriage. Their daughter Huang Xin (黄新), aka April, was born in April 2010.

Huang had little publicly available information before his marriage and deliberately maintained the secrecy afterward. In March 2010, on the eve of Zhao's childbirth, Southern Metropolis Entertainment Weekly had prepared a six-page profile on Huang based on months of investigation. Zhao, who had shied away from the Chinese media in Singapore throughout her pregnancy, personally called the editor-in-chief, asking the magazine to drop the report. In exchange, she agreed to a six-page exclusive interview and provided photos of her pregnancy.

Since their marriage, Zhao and Huang had established themselves as a business power couple through high-profile investments, notably in Alibaba Pictures, where they became the second-largest shareholders in 2014, until their reputation has been increasingly tarnished by business scandals. Huang has faced persistent speculation about the origins of his wealth, reportedly accumulated around 2000 or 2001 while working for a now-defunct company under the Aviation Industry Corporation of China in Shenzhen. His wealth is often rumored to have been linked to his alleged role as a "driver" and "white glove" (bagman) for disgraced Shenzhen mayor Xu Zongheng. In early 2017, Deng Shen Xian, a media outlet under China Business Journal, published a series of investigative reports about the couple, dismissing that Huang had been Xu's driver but suggesting a connection between Huang's rise and Huang Liman, who had been Shenzhen's party chief from 2001 to 2005.

In November 2017, Zhao and Huang were banned from China's securities market for five years for their failed 2016 takeover bid of Zhejiang Wanija, which "disrupted market order", and were named in the Paradise Papers, which revealed their previously undisclosed $80 million investment. Soon after, Xia Ke Dao, a media outlet under the People's Daily, repeated the claim that Huang had served as a "driver" for Xu, prompting Huang to refute it on Weibo, stating, "I have never been anyone's 'driver'," emphasizing his "humble origins" and apologizing for the impact on his wife. Zhao reposted his statement in support. In July 2024, a New York Times investigative report revealed that Zhao and Huang acted as agents for Xiao Jianhua, who funded the couple's investments in Jack Ma's companies and their bid of Zhejiang Wanjia, which was thwarted after Xiao had been abducted in Hong Kong by Chinese security agents in 2017.

In March 2021, prosecutors in Dongguan issued a red notice through Interpol against Huang for his alleged involvement in the 2019 financial scandal of Tuandai.com, which was convicted in China of illegally absorbing public funds. On 22 March 2021, Huang was arrested upon landing in Bordeaux, France, after a private flight from Reykjavík, Iceland. Although detained, he was permitted to retain access to his mobile phone and received calls from several individuals, including Jack Ma, urging him to return to China. During a court appearance in France, Huang claimed that the Chinese authorities' request for his return was tied to the case of Sun Lijun, the disgraced Vice Minister of Public Security, with whom his only connection was Sun's request in 2018 for him to invest approximately USD 5 million in a security company. On 14 May 2021, the Chinese Embassy in Paris formally submitted an extradition request to the French Ministry of Foreign Affairs. In July, the Bordeaux Court of Appeal rejected the extradition request, stating that, based on evidence provided by Huang, the Chinese government's request was not primarily related to the criminal charges against him but rather intended to secure his testimony against Sun. Interpol subsequently withdrew the red notice.

Zhao and Huang secretly divorced on 23 July 2021. A month later, she was blacklisted in China. Zhao announced her divorce on 28 December 2024.

== Philanthropy ==
Zhao has been actively involved in charity and disaster relief work. Her notable charity work and donations include:

- In 1999, Zhao donated 100,000 yuan, after the Taiwan 921 earthquake.
- In 2004, with the local education authority, she set up a scholarship and study grant fund in Wuhu, her hometown. for students from families in financial difficulties.
- In 2005, she was appointed as a spokesperson and ambassador for the United Nations Children's Fund and China Youth Concern Committee's "Awareness for Children Affected by AIDS" campaign; she also performed the song "来得及的明天" (pinyin: lái dé jí dè míng tiān; lit. 'Still Time for Tomorrow') as the theme song for the campaign.
- In 2006, Zhao supported fundraising events for the Smile Angel Foundation, a charity fund set up by Zhao's friend, pop diva Faye Wong, for children with clefts.
- The morning following the 2008 Sichuan earthquake, Zhao donated 100,000 yuan to the China Red Cross. Soon afterward, she donated 500,000 yuan to the China Children and Teenagers' Fund to construct a Spring Bude Building School.
- On 29 March 2010, Zhao donated 200,000 RMB to the Yunnan government, as Yunnan was suffering from the worst drought during the past few decades. On 17 April, the third day after the Qinghai Yushu Earthquake, Zhao donated 200,000 yuan to the China Foundation for Poverty Alleviation.
- In 2011, Zhao received the China Charity Billboard Award for her contributions to charity.
- On 22 April 2013, Zhao donated 500,000 RMB to the Sichuan Yaan Earthquake.
- In 2014, Zhao launched the V-Love Foundation for childhood leukemia. Also in 2014, Zhao was named ambassador for the Global Alliance for Clean Cookstoves.
- In June 2016, Zhao donated 1 million RMB to the Anhui government, as Anhui was suffering from the worst flooding during the past decade. The same year, Zhao was appointed ambassador for China Soong Ching Ling Foundation and the United Nations Development Programme's (UNDP) "Ethnic Minority Women Empowerment and Development Project", aimed to promote sustainable human development with ethnic minority women through joint collaborations in social and economic development. She was also named the ambassador for an Anti Child-trafficking campaign by the Chinese Ministry of Public Security. On 20 November, UNDP appointed her as goodwill ambassador. On 26 December, Zhao held a charity party for her V-Love Foundation and raised donations more than 16 million yuan for childhood leukemia.
- In July 2017, Zhao and her husband donated 1 million HKD to the Hunan government, as Hunan was suffering from flooding.

== Controversy ==
=== Japanese flag dress ===
In 2001, Zhao posed for a photo shoot in New York for the August issue of Shizhuang Fashion. In one image, she wore a Heatherette dress designed by Richie Rich. The photo attracted little attention upon publication but, three months later, drew backlash online after being interpreted as resembling the Japanese military's Rising Sun flag used during World War II. In December 2001, the Changsha-based Xiaoxiang Morning Herald, following a reader's tip, reported on the online controversy, which quickly escalated into a wider public outrage. On 9 December, Beijing Evening News and Sina published Zhao's apology letter. On 17 December, Zhao again apologized on the television show Entertainment Live.

On 28 December 2001, during her performance at a Hunan Economic TV gala in Changsha, Zhao was attacked and had feces thrown at her on stage by Fu Shenghua, a construction worker who claimed his grandparents had been killed during the Second Sino-Japanese War. However, after a two-month investigation, Beijing Youth Daily concluded that Fu had lied to the media. The investigation revealed that no one in his family had been killed during the war and that Fu was not a construction worker but had been unemployed for several years.

=== Alleged assault on pregnant woman ===
Due to Zhao's "Japanese flag dress" controversy, Zou Xue aka Snow Zou, then editor of L'Officiel China, stepped down from the magazine. She later became a business partner with Zhao and they opened a bar in Beijing in February 2004, but it went out of business within two months due to mismanagement, leading to their disputes. On 28 July 2004, Zhao's driver, Wu Jue, led around 20 people into a Beijing restaurant where Zou, then eight months pregnant, was staying and assaulted her, allegedly saying it was a lesson on behalf of Zhao. Zou accused Wu of acting under Zhao's orders, accused Zhao of using drugs with friends at the bar, physically abusing employees, before taking Zhao to court. In April 2005, the court found Zhao not guilty, holding Wu solely responsible. Wu was ordered to pay Zou medical expenses amounting to RMB 2,146 and an additional RMB 1,000 for emotional distress. After the incident, Zou changed her Chinese name to Zou Xian. In 2014, when she reemerged as the director of But Always, she stated that she had reconciled with Zhao and they remained close friends.

=== Alleged nightclub altercation ===
In 2005, Next Magazine reported that Zhao was involved in a late-night altercation at a Shanghai nightclub with her then-boyfriend, Wang Yu, son of former Shanghai mayor Wang Daohan, and a group of Taiwanese patrons affiliated with triads. According to the report, an argument broke out after Zhao allegedly slapped one of the men, led by Fu Hao, the son of Four Seas Gang kingpin Fu Hengsheng, when they did not yield to her in a narrow corridor. The incident escalated into a brawl in which Wang was beaten and later returned with several people, resulting in further violence, before taking the matter to the Shanghai police.

=== No Other Love ===
On 25 April 2016, Zhao posted costume photos of the main cast members from her second directorial feature, No Other Love, on Weibo, including Taiwanese actor Leon Dai and Japanese actress Kiko Mizuhara. The post quickly sparked controversy on the Chinese internet. Dai was accused of supporting Taiwanese independence primarily due to his participation in the Sunflower Movement and the Anti-Black Box Curriculum Movement. Meanwhile, Mizuhara faced criticism for liking an "anti-China" Instagram photo, posted by a Japanese friend, of Chinese dissident artist Ai Weiwei flipping off Tiananmen Square—a like she retracted an hour later.

Zhao completed the film in June 2016. On 1 July, the Communist Youth League criticized Zhao for casting Dai and accused him of supporting Taiwanese independence in a Weibo post, which was initially removed by the platform. Weibo stated that the removal was automatically triggered by sensitive terms in the post, such as "Falun Gong", and reinstated it on 6 July following an appeal by the Communist Youth League. However, given that Weibo is partially owned by Alibaba, where Zhao is the second-largest shareholder in its film division—the publisher of No Other Love—the removal of an official organ's post intensified the online backlash against the film, fueling a storm of conspiracy theories accusing Zhao of manipulating public opinion through "capital" and labeling her an "American spy", an "Illuminati member", and a "secret murderer", among other accusations. On 15 July, the studio announced that due to its lack of due diligence in investigating Dai's political background and his ambiguous public statements on the matter, the film would replace him. Dai and Mizuhara later posted apologies while both denying the accusations. Ten years later, in March 2026, the film was released under the Chinese title Feng Mi De Zhen (Chinese: 蜂蜜的针; lit. 'The Honey Sting'), with its English title unchanged. The scenes featuring Dai and Mizuhara were reshot with different actors, and the director credit was changed from Zhao to the producer Yuan Mei.

=== Xiao Jianhua case ===
Zhao's company Longwei Media had been planning to acquire Zhejiang Sunriver Culture Co since late 2016, when it was then named Zhejiang Wanjia Co, a Shanghai-listed company. The acquisition was to be primarily financed by Xiao Jianhua's Tomorrow Group. On 27 January 2017, Xiao was abducted from the Four Seasons Hotel, Hong Kong and taken to mainland China. Subsequent to this, the acquisition agreement underwent multiple changes, with Longwei Media failing to secure bank financing and reducing the acquiring stake, before eventually canceling the agreement entirely, with no penalties pursued by either party. In November 2017, the China Securities Regulatory Commission (CSRC) investigated Longwei Media and found that its capital operations contained "false records, misleading statements, and material omissions". The CSRC fined Zhao and her husband, Huang Youlong, 300,000 yuan each, with an additional 600,000 yuan fine for the company. Furthermore, the CSRC imposed a five-year ban on Zhao and Huang from participating in the securities market. The punishment against them was seen as a signal of a crackdown on the Tomorrow Group, given the couple's close association with Xiao. The punishment was also heavily amplified by JD.com through an organized astroturfing campaign that sought to associate Zhao with Jack Ma of Alibaba, JD's main competitor.

In July 2024, a New York Times investigative report revealed that Zhao and Huang acted as agents for Xiao in his investments in Ma's companies. The report indicated that Zhao and Huang used approximately $400 million provided by Xiao to acquire a 9% stake in Alibaba Pictures. Additionally, an employee of Xiao's was identified as the largest single investor in a fund managed by Yunfeng Financial, comprising Ma's associates and relatives, including Zhao's mother. This fund is one of the largest shareholders of Ant Group.

== Discography ==
- 1999: Swallow (小燕子)
- 1999: Magic of Love (爱情大魔咒)
- 2001: The Last Separation (最后一次分手)
- 2004: Afloat (飘)
- 2005: Double (双)
- 2007: Angel's Suitcase (天使旅行箱)
- 2009: We're All Great Directors (我们都是大导演)

== Ambassadorship ==
- 2001 World University Games
- 2002 China Youth Development Foundation "Hope Project"
- 2002 All-China Environment Federation
- 2004 China Farmers Games
- 2005 United Nations Children's Fund's "Orphan and Vulnerable Children, Children Affected by AIDS Awareness"
- 2007 World Special Olympic Games
- 2007 China Foundation of Disabled Person "Lighting Activities"
- 2008 China Red Cross "Heart Project"
- 2009 China Flowers Expo
- 2010 Changchun Film Festival
- 2011 Golden Rooster and Hundred Flowers Film Festival
- 2013 Festival du Cinéma Chinois en France
- 2014 China Sport Show
- 2014 United Nations Foundation's Global Alliance for Clean Cookstoves
- 2016 The Ministry of Public Security of China's Anti-kidnapping
- 2016 United Nations Development Programme's Goodwill Ambassador
- 2018 Xining FIRST International Film Festival
- 2019 Festival Croisements

=== Endorsements ===
From 2013 to 2014, Zhao was the spokeswoman of Samsung Galaxy Note 3. From 2012 to 2017, Zhao was the official ambassador of Jaeger-LeCoultre. Since 2018, Zhao has been selected as the official brand ambassador of Burberry. Since 2020, Italian luxury brand Fendi has announced that Zhao will serve as the brand's spokesperson in China.

== Awards and nominations ==
=== Forbes China Celebrity 100 ===
Year	Rank	Ref.
2004	3rd	
2005	4th	
2006	4th	
2008	7th	
2009	7th	
2013	80th	
2014	22nd	
2015	7th	
2017	28th	
