= Hollywood Adventures =

2015 Chinese-American-Hong Kong film by Tim Kendall

- Theatrical release poster
- Traditional Chinese: 橫衝直撞好萊塢
- Simplified Chinese: 横冲直撞好莱坞
- Literal meaning: dash around madly in Hollywood
- Hanyu Pinyin: héngchōngzhízhuàng Hǎoláiwū
- Directed by: Timothy Kendall
- Screenplay by: Brice Beckham; David Fickas; Justin Lin; Philip W. Chung; Alfredo Botello
- Produced by: Justin Lin; Zhao Wei; Anne Clements; Troy Craig Poon; John Pierson
- Starring: Zhao Wei; Huang Xiaoming; Tong Dawei
- Cinematography: Sam Chase
- Edited by: Thomas Nordberg
- Music by: Nathan Barr
- Production companies: Beijing Enlight Pictures; Sun Seven Stars Entertainment; Perfect Storm Entertainment
- Distributed by: Beijing Enlight Pictures
- Release dates: June 25, 2015 (Australia); June 26, 2015 (China)
- Running time: 119 minutes
- Countries: China; United States; Hong Kong
- Languages: Mandarin; English
- Budget: US$30 million
- Box office: US$51.6 million

Hollywood Adventures is a 2015 action comedy film directed by Tim Kendall, starring Zhao Wei, Huang Xiaoming and Tong Dawei. It was largely filmed in Los Angeles, United States. The film was released on June 26, 2015.

== Plot summary ==
Xiaoming, a Hong Kong car salesman, is content with his meticulously planned-out life until his girlfriend Yan Yan gets a job at the American film studio Wronald Wright Productions and breaks up their relationship. After a brief period of self-pity, he impulsively decides to travel to Los Angeles and books a place on a guided tour named "Hollywood Adventures". On the plane, he meets an exuberant movie fanatic named Fang Dawei, also a participant on the tour, and at LAX he is rescued by Wei Wei, his tour guide, from a misunderstanding with Homeland Security.

Once in Hollywood, Xiaoming tries to contact Yan Yan, but she keeps cutting off his calls. He also ends up accidentally busting a covert FBI operation and fleeing for his life with Wei Wei, Dawei, and the mission's objective, a bag of powdered rhino horn. Dawei deduces that the tour is actually a front for a smuggling operation in which he and Xiaoming unwittingly got mixed up. Wei Wei cuts a deal with Xiaoming: In return for the bag, she will take him to Yan Yan. However, their possession of the powder and Xiaoming's phone, which he dropped, put them right into the crosshairs of Interpol, the FBI and Manny Love, the mastermind of the "Hollywood Adventures" smuggling ring, who frames Wei Wei in order to cut a deal with the authorities.

The trio of fugitives reaches the Wronald Wright Productions office at Monumental Studios. They trick the studio personnel into believing that Dawei has come to audition for a role, while Xiaoming and Wei Wei sneak inside to find a clue to Yan Yan's whereabouts. Forced to flee the police crackup of the smuggling ring, they hitch a ride to a movie set where Yan Yan is supposed to be. Over several mishaps on the road, Xiaoming and Wei begin to bond.

Upon arriving at the set (and after inadvertently ruining Wright's newest action shoot), Dawei encounters his personal idol Kat Dennings, and Xiaoming meets Yan Yan again. However, Yan Yan refuses to hear Xiaoming out, and he leaves in disgust. Right afterwards, the three are picked up by Manny, who had Yan Yan kidnapped by his henchmen and now forces Wei Wei to deliver the rhino horn powder to its buyer, actor and pretentious philanthropist Gary Buesheimer, within the next 24 hours. Xiaoming's incautious approach causes Buesheimer and his friend and partner Rick Fox to take him and Wei Wei prisoner until Dawei, an accomplished master martial artist, rescues them.

With the rhino horn gone, the trio goes on the offensive and calls Manny, pretending that the deal went smoothly, but then Manny demands that the exchange of Buesheimer's payment for Yan Yan is to take place at a very exclusive celebrity party which Buesheimer also attends. After enlisting the aid of Wright, who despises Buesheimer, they infiltrate the event and hand Manny a fake payment, but upon discovering the ruse, Manny starts shooting at Wei Wei, throwing the party into chaos, and escapes with Yan Yan. Xiaoming, Wei Wei and Dawei take up pursuit, and after a furious chase through a container port and the Los Angeles river canals they rescue Yan Yan and get Manny and Buesheimer arrested. While Xiaoming and Yan Yan reconcile, Wei Wei is also arrested, but released soon after Xiaoming and Dawei provide evidence of Manny's guilt. Disappointed of the outcome because she has fallen in love with Xiaoming, Wei Wei travels back to Hong Kong, only to find Xiaoming waiting for her, and the two embrace and kiss. The film ends with Dawei having entered a relationship with Dennings and trying his hand as a superhero.

== Cast ==
- Zhao Wei as Wei Wei
- Huang Xiaoming as Xiaoming
- Tong Dawei as Fang Dawei
- Sarah Yan Li as Yan Yan (credited as "Zhang Yan")
- Sung Kang as Bung Ho Lee / "Manny Love"
- Rhys Coiro as Gary Buesheimer
- Simon Helberg as Harvey Millsap, Translator
- Omar Dorsey as Homeland Security Agent
- Brian Thomas Smith as Dougie
- Missi Pyle as Casting Director
- Parvesh Cheena as Casting Assistant
- Bridgett Riley as Mrs. Covington
- Stephen Tobolowsky as Wronald Wright
- Robert Patrick as Studio Guard #1
- Lyndall Grant as Studio Guard #2
- Rick Fox as Himself
- Kat Dennings as Herself
- James Patrick Stuart as FBI Agent Fox
- Roger Fan as Interpol Agent Li
- Tyrese Gibson as Himself (cameo)
- Hardy Awadjie as Movie Set Cop

== Production ==
The film had a budget of US$30 million.

== Reception ==
Derek Elley of Film Business Asia gave the film a 7 out of 10, calling it "a good-natured, tightly constructed action comedy".
