= No Other Love (film) =

- Traditional Chinese: 沒有別的愛
- Simplified Chinese: 没有别的爱
- Hanyu Pinyin: Méiyǒu Biéde Ài
- Directed by: Vicky Zhao Wei
- Production companies: Max Film; Alibaba Pictures

No Other Love is an unreleased Chinese film. The production had started in 2016 directed by Vicky Zhao Wei for Max Film and various Chinese companies, including Alibaba Pictures Group. The film was written by Li Qiang.

== Production ==
The film would have been Wei's second feature as a director, after So Young in 2013.

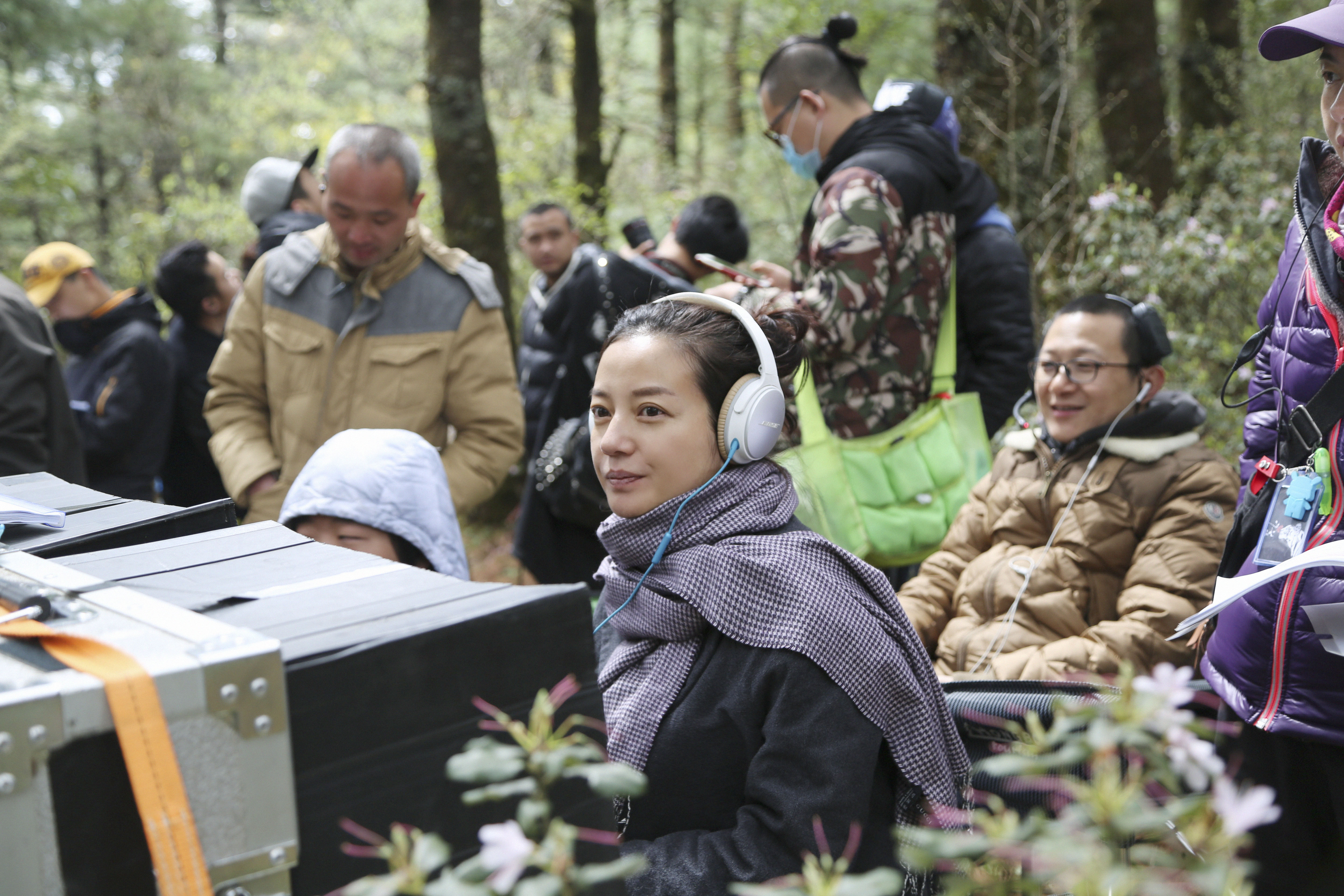
Wei behind the camera in 2016.

== Politics ==
In 2016 the film production removed the scenes of Leon Dai, a Taiwanese actor, after outcry among the Communist Youth League, even though his filming was already completed. A campaign by Chinese netizens had accused Dai of supporting Taiwanese independence. The major criticism of Dai was that he had taken an "ambiguous stance over the country and national identity by supporting the Sunflower Movement. The film's funders stated they were unhappy with his response to the inquiries.

Another member of the cast was replaced after a similar campaign, namely Kiko Mizuhara for having visited the Yasukuni Shrine, a place associated with various controversies concerning Japanese war crimes in China.

== See also ==
- Dao Bai Controversy
