= Moment in Peking (2005 TV series) =

- Poster
- 京华烟云 / 京華煙雲
- Created by: Zou Jingzhi; Zhang Yongchen; Yang Xiaoxiong
- Starring: Zhao Wei; Pan Yueming; Chen Baoguo; Pan Hong; Wang Gang; Zhao Kuier; Kou Zhenhai; Yu Qian; Qiu Qiwen; Huang Weide
- Country of origin: China
- No. of episodes: 44

Production
- Running time: 45 mins per episode

Original release
- Network: CCTV-1
- Release: October 23, 2005 – December 2005

Moment in Peking is a 2005 Chinese television series produced by CCTV. It is adapted from the novel Moment in Peking by Lin Yutang, who was nominated for a Nobel Prize in 1940 and 1950.

== Synopsis ==
Zeng family's eldest son falls gravely ill, prompting Mulan to marry him in place of his fiancée to bring good fortune, setting off a chain of mistaken marriages, heartbreak, and tangled relationships. Despite loving another man, Mulan sacrifices her own happiness for duty and family, eventually marrying the third son Sunya by accident. Through war, betrayal, and tragedy, Mulan becomes the moral anchor of the family, quietly enduring and holding everyone together.

== Cast ==
- Zhao Wei as Yao Mulan
- Pan Yueming as Zeng Sunya
- Chen Baoguo as Yao Sian
- Pan Hong as Mrs. Yao
- Victor Huang as Kong Lifu
- Qiu Qiwen as Yao Mochou
- Wang Gang as Niu Sidao
- Hu Ke as Niu Suyun

== Reception ==
- National rating champion of the year 2005 in China, 8.782%.(Source:AGB Nielsen)
- "Zhao Wei is grace and elegence, who controlled each sense."----Asia Times

== Accolades ==
Award	Category	Nominee	Result
China Audience TV Festival	Favorite Television Series	Moment in Peking	Won
China TV Drama Awards	Best Television Series	Moment in Peking	Won
China TV Drama Awards	Best Producer	Wang Pengyu; Yang Shanpu	Won
China TV Drama Awards	Best Director	Zhang Zien	Nominated
China TV Drama Awards	Best Writing	Zhang Yongchen; Yang Xiaoxiong	Nominated
China TV Drama Awards	Best Lead Actress	Zhao Wei	Nominated
China TV Drama Awards	Best Supporting Actor	Wang Gang	Won
China TV Drama Awards	Best Supporting Actor	Kou Zhenhai	Nominated
China TV Drama Awards	Best Supporting Actress	Pan Hong	Nominated
China TV Drama Awards	Best Original Theme Song	Wang Liguang (Composer); Feng Hai (Lyrist); Zhao Wei (Performer)	Nominated
China TV Drama Awards	Favorite Actress	Zhao Wei	Won
26th Feitian Awards	Outstanding Television Series	Moment in Peking	Nominated
26th Feitian Awards	Outstanding Actress	Zhao Wei	Nominated
5th Golden Disk Awards	Best Original Music of Film or Television Series	Wang Liguang	Won
5th Golden Disk Awards	Best Original Theme Song	Wang Liguang (Composer); Feng Hai (Lyrist); Zhao Wei (Performer)	Won

== Influence ==
After airing on Taiwan and mainland China, for the series is very popular, there were a large stream to Lin Yutang's former residence. Audience started to focus on the classic novel again.

In an episode of Taiwan long-term series Unforgettable Memories, the major role is watching the sense of Zhao Wei and Huang Weide break up in Moment in Peking.
