= Piao (album) =

Piao 飘

Studio album by Zhao Wei
- Released: 22 November 2004
- Genre: Mandopop
- Labels: Virgin Records, EMI

Zhao Wei chronology
The Last Separation (2001)	Piao 飘 (2004)	Double 双 (2005)

Piao is an album by Zhao Wei. This album sold 300,000 copies in the first ten days following its release.

== Track listing ==
No.	Title	Lyrics	Music	Length
1.	"变了" (Changed)	Yao Chien (姚谦)	Chen Jingjing (陈金晶)	4:49
2.	"这一刻我相信你说我爱你" (At This Moment I Believe You And I Love You)	Yao Chien (姚谦)	Faith Yang (杨孝芬)	4:15
3.	"渐渐" (Gradually)	Chen Ko Hua (陈克华)	Huang Yida (黄义达)	3:55
4.	"无尽的莎士比亚" (Never End Shakespears)	Yao Chien (姚谦)	Zhang Yadong (张亚东)	4:43
5.	"一直下雨的星期天" (Rainning Sunday)	Yao Chien (姚谦)	Minski	3:46
6.	"表情 动作 语言" (Expression Of Action)	Steven Kwok (郭伟聪)	Steven Kwok (郭伟聪)	4:20
7.	"状态" (Status)	Isaac Chen (陈镇川)	Peter Lee Shih Shiong (李偲菘)	3:49
8.	"生命里的这一天" (On This Day Of Life)	Yao Chien (姚谦)	Dai Lei (戴蕾)	3:58
9.	"十一月" (November)	Yao Chien (姚谦)	Huang Yingying (黄莹莹)	3:45
10.	"天使之名" (Name of Angel)	Yao Chien (姚谦)	Paul Lee Wei Shiong (李伟菘)	4:41

== Awards and nominations ==
6th Top Chinese Music Chart Awards

- Won: Favorite Female Artist
- Won: Top 10 Golden Songs of the Year-Gradually
- Won: Top 10 Golden Songs of the Year-Rainning Sunday
- Nominated: Best Female Artist
- Nominated: Best Album

12th ERC Chinese Top Ten Awards

- Won: Best On-stage Performance
- Won: Best Music Video-Gradually
- Won: Golden Song of the Year-Gradually
- Nominated: Favorite Artist

4th Sprite China Original Pop Music Chart Awards

- Won: Best All-round Artist
- Won: Favorite Artist on the Network
- Won: Golden Song of the Year-Rainning Sundy
- Nominated: Favorite Artist

12th China Music Chart Awards

- Won: TOP 15 Golden Melody of the Year-Gradually
