= Thank You for Having Loved Me =

- 谢谢你曾经爱过我
- Created by: Hui-Ling Wang
- Starring: Zhao Wei; Tuo Zonghua; Qin Hailu; Zhou Yiwei; Pan Hong
- Country of origin: China
- No. of episodes: 30

Production
- Running time: 45 mins per episode

Original release
- Network: Shandong TV, SMG
- Release: July 13, 2007 – August 2007

Academy Awards best screenplay nominee Hui-Ling Wang's first television screenplay after Crouching Tiger, Hidden Dragon.

== Cast ==
- Tan Yuwei, played by Zhao Wei
- Houzi, played by Zhou Yiwei
- Huo Ran, played by Tuo Zonghua
- Yin Zhihan, played by Qin Hailu
- Su Lijuan, played by Pan Hong

== International broadcast ==
Country or Region	Network	Premiere	Title
China	Shandong Television	2007	谢谢你曾经爱过我
Hong Kong	Mei Ah TV	2008	謝謝你曾經愛過我
United States	K18HD-D	2008	Thanks for Having Loved Me
Thailand	True Film Asia	2011	
Taiwan	CTS	2016	謝謝你曾經愛過我

== Soundtrack ==
Theme Song:At This Time(Chinese Title:这一次) performed by Zhao Wei
