= The Longest Night in Shanghai =

- Official release poster
- Directed by: Zhang Yibai
- Written by: Yuji Yamamura; Zhang Yibai
- Produced by: Yumiko Takebe; Xu Wen; Ruan Wenwen
- Starring: Zhao Wei; Masahiro Motoki
- Cinematography: Yang Tao
- Edited by: Tao Wen
- Music by: Hiroaki Ito
- Production companies: Avex Entertainment; Movie-Eye Entertainment
- Release dates: June 26, 2007 (China); September 22, 2007 (Japan)
- Running time: 110 minutes
- Countries: China; Japan
- Languages: Mandarin; Japanese

The Longest Night in Shanghai (Chinese: 夜。上海; Japanese: 夜の上海) is a 2007 romantic drama film produced by Japan's Movie-Eye Entertainment and directed by Chinese director Zhang Yibai. It is a rare collaboration between China and Japan.

The film consists of a diverse cast. It stars Chinese actress Zhao Wei and Japanese actor Masahiro Motoki. Other members of the cast include Taiwanese actor Dylan Kuo, Hong Kong actor Sam Lee, and Japanese actress Naomi Nishida.

== Plot ==
Top hairstylist Naoki Mizushima travels to Shanghai to work at a charity music festival, accompanied by his longtime lover and manager, Miho. Showcasing his extraordinary talent, Naoki meticulously designs unique hairstyles for each of the performing artists. The music festival is a huge success. Yet, Naoki feels disheartened. Though his career appears to be sailing smoothly, he finds the work tiresome. More troubling is his deteriorating relationship with Miho, which is nearing a breaking point. To make matters worse, there's Kawaguchi, who secretly harbors feelings for Miho. Watching Kawaguchi's relentless pursuit of her, Naoki sinks into deep unease. Restless and absent-minded, Naoki wanders the city streets, only to suddenly realize he has no money or identification on him. He had grown used to relying on Miho for everything, even forgetting the name of their hotel. Left with no choice, Naoki roams alone under the Shanghai night sky.

Just then, a taxi abruptly interrupts his thoughts, driven by a bold female driver named Lin Xi. She apologizes for her reckless driving, and thus begins an unexpected journey through the city. Naoki sees her as a warm and enthusiastic guide; Lin Xi, on the other hand, secretly believes she's landed a big-spending foreign tourist. Suddenly, Lin Xi receives a phone call from Dongdong, the man of her dreams. Upon hearing that he's getting married the next day, she falls from elation into despair. Though Naoki doesn't understand what's happening, the anguish on Lin Xi's face mirrors the emotional turmoil within himself.

Meanwhile, chaos erupts at the festival venue due to Naoki's disappearance. Miho and Kawaguchi, Naoki's assistant Hara, interpreter Xiao Shen, and ad agency rep Yamaoka all scramble across Shanghai in a frantic search. Both wounded souls, Naoki and Lin Xi, find solace in an unexpected encounter, during one fateful night. Through chance and vulnerability, they begin to open up, revealing the scars, worries, and emptiness they've long kept hidden.

== Cast ==
- Zhao Wei as Lin Xi
- Masahiro Motoki as Naoki Mizushima
- Naomi Nishida as Miho Takahashi
- Shinobu Otsuka as Rie Hara
- Naoto Takenaka as Taro Yamaoka
- Takashi Tsukamoto as Ryuichi Kawaguchi
- Toshihiro Wada as Atsushi Kayama
- Dylan Kuo as Dongdong
- Sam Lee as Xiao Shen
- Feng Li as Lin Xi's brother
- Ben Niu as Old taxi-driver
- Zhang Xinyi as Policewoman

== Soundtrack ==
Firefly; Breathe (by Frally Hynes)

== Reception ==
"Pic shuttlecocks between the corny and the involving, but Zhao's natural perf and Shanghai itself (always front and center, knitted into the action) keep things watchable." – Variety

== Awards and nominations ==
Awards
Award	Category	Name	Outcome
Ibiza International Film Festival	Golden Falcon Award		Nominated
Ibiza International Film Festival	Independent Spirit Prize		Won
Beijing College Student Film Festival	Grand Jury Prix		Won
Beijing College Student Film Festival	Favorite Actress	Zhao Wei	Won
Shanghai International Film Festival Press Prize	Box Office Protential		Won
Shanghai International Film Festival Press Prize	Most Attractive Actress	Zhao Wei	Won
Huabiao Awards	Outstanding Co-produced Film		Nominated
Tiburon International Film Festival	Best Film		Nominated
Huading Awards	Best Actress	Zhao Wei	Won
