= Forbes China Celebrity 100 =

The Forbes China Celebrity 100 is a list published annually by Forbes that ranks the influence of Chinese celebrities. First published in 2004, it is similar to the Celebrity 100 also published by Forbes. Factors that are taken into account include income, search engine hits, as well as exposure in newspapers, magazines, and television.

Prior to 2010, the list only included celebrities born in mainland China. In 2010, it started to include Chinese celebrities born in Hong Kong, Taiwan, and other countries or regions. The list was suspended in 2016 and 2018. It published only a top 10 ranking in 2021 and has been discontinued since.
