= Double (Zhao Wei album) =

Double 双

Studio album by Zhao Wei
- Released: 22 July 2005
- Genre: Mandopop
- Labels: Virgin Records, EMI

Zhao Wei chronology
| Afloat (2004) | Double 双 (2005) | Angel's Suitcase (2007) |

Double 双 is a 2005 album by mainland Chinese pop singer Zhao Wei. Its first single, "Still Time for Tomorrow" (Chinese: 来得及的明天; pinyin: lái dé jí de míngtiān) was the theme song for UNICEF's "Attention for Children Affected by AIDS" campaign (Chinese: 关注受艾滋病影响儿童项目). The first week sold more than 150,000 in mainland China.

== Track listing ==
| No. | Title | Lyrics | Music | Length |
|---|---|---|---|---|
| 1. | "来得及的明天" (Still Time for Tomorrow) | Yao Chien (姚谦) | Xu Wei (许巍) | 3:37 |
| 2. | "顺风逆风" (With the Wind, Against the Wind) | Yao Chien (姚谦) | Huang Yida (黄义达) | 3:54 |
| 3. | "微小的部分" (Tiny Part) | Yao Chien (姚谦) | Li Meng (李勐) | 3:46 |
| 4. | "痛苦之歌" (Painful Song) | Yao Chien (姚谦) | Paul Lee Wei Shiong (李伟菘) | 3:54 |
| 5. | "我和上官燕" (Shangguanyan and I) | Crystal Hsu (文雅) | Benny Hsiao | 4:19 |
| 6. | "多情应笑我" (Emotions Don't Laugh At Me) | Yao Chien (姚谦) | Chen Wei (陈伟) | 4:57 |
| 7. | "孰轻孰重" (What's Light, What's Heavy) | Yao Chien (姚谦) | Chen Wei (陈伟) | 4:10 |
| 8. | "夜长梦多" (Long Night, Many Dreams) | Chow Yiu-fai (周耀辉) | Tony Wen (闻震) | 4:32 |
| 9. | "不要告别" (Won't Say Goodbye) | Chen Ping (陈平) | Yi Zhiqing (逸之青) | 3:40 |
| 10. | "发现" (Realization) | Zhu Hai (朱海) | Wang Liguang (王黎光) | 5:11 |
| 11. | "爱" (Love) | Yao Chien (姚谦) | Wang Liguang (王黎光) | 3:36 |

== Awards and nominations ==
6th Top Chinese Music Chart Awards

- Nominated: Best Female Artist
- Nominated: Best Album

14th Channel [V] Globle China Music Awards

- Won: Favorite Female Artist
- Won: Favorite Music Video

13th ERC Chinese Top Ten Awards

- Won: Favorite Artist
- Won: Golden Melody of the Year-Shangguan Yan and I

Music Radio Top Chart Awards

- Won: Favorite Female Artist Mainland China
- Won: Golden Melody of the Year-Shangguan Yan and I
- Won: Best Lyrics (Wen Ya)
- Nominated: Best Female Artist Mainland China
