= We're All Great Directors =

We're All Great Directors 我们都是大导演

Studio album by Zhao Wei
- Released: 7 August 2009
- Genre: Mandopop
- Label: MBOX

Zhao Wei chronology
Angel's Suitcase (2007)	We're All Great Directors 我们都是大导演 (2009)

We're All Great Directors is an album by Zhao Wei. It marks the release of the second album by independent music studio MBOX. This album online digital download was released on 7 August 2009.

== Track listing ==
No.	Title	Lyrics	Music	Length
1.	"大导演" (Frameless)	Lin Qiao (林乔)	Li Ronghao (李荣浩)	4:43
2.	"老板娘" (Aspirin)	Lin Qiao (林乔)/Li Ronghao (李荣浩)/Wu Mengqi（吴梦奇）	Wu Mengqi (吴梦奇)	4:26
3.	"走散" (Separated)	Li Ronghao (李荣浩)	Li Ronghao (李荣浩)	4:45
4.	"游园会" (In The Crowd)	Lin Qiao (林乔)	Sen Sen (森森)	4:31
5.	"幻与幻想" (Illusion)	Lin Qiao (林乔)	Wu Mengqi (吴梦奇)	4:59
6.	"江城子" (Elegy)	Lin Qiao (林乔)/Su Shi (苏轼)	Cao Fang (曹方)	4:09
7.	"Happiness"	Lin Qiao (林乔)	Xiang Zhilian (项知廉)	4:33
8.	"觉醒" (Awakening)	Lin Qiao (林乔)	Luo Yasheng (罗亚圣)	4:57
9.	"木兰香" (Magnolia)	Wang Linyun (王凌云)	Qi Feng (祈峰)	4:06
10.	"时间停了" (Time Stood Still)	Daryl Yao (姚若龙)	Leong Wai Foong (梁伟丰)	3:58
Total length:				45:07

== Awards and nominations ==
CCTV-MTV Music Awards

- Nominated: Best Female Vocal Performance
- Nominated: Favorite Female Artist

15th Channel[V] Globe Music Chart Awards

- Nominated: Best Female Vocal Performance
- Nominated: Favorite Female Artist

Music Radio Top Chart Awards

- Nominated: Favorite Female Artist
