= Jade Goddess of Mercy =

2003 Chinese-Hong Kong film by Ann Hui

- Film poster
- Traditional Chinese: 玉觀音
- Hanyu Pinyin: Yù Guān Yīn
- Directed by: Ann Hui
- Written by: Ivy Ho
- Story by: Hai Yan
- Produced by: Li Bolun; Yang Buting
- Starring: Zhao Wei; Nicholas Tse; Liu Yunlong; Chen Jianbin
- Cinematography: Kwan Pun Leung
- Music by: Zhao Lin
- Production companies: Century Hero Film Investment Company; China Film Group Corporation
- Distributed by: China Film Group Corporation (China); Universe Entertainment (Hong Kong)
- Release dates: 25 December 2003 (China); 15 April 2004 (Hong Kong)
- Running time: 110 minutes
- Countries: China; Hong Kong
- Language: Mandarin

Jade Goddess of Mercy, or Goddess of Mercy (Chinese: 玉觀音; pinyin: Yù Guān Yīn), is a 2003 drama film directed by Ann Hui and starring Zhao Wei and Nicholas Tse. A Chinese-Hong Kong co-production, it was adapted from a novel by Chinese writer Hai Yan. The title comes from a necklace featuring Kuan Yin, the "Goddess of Mercy".

In 2003, Hai Yan also produced a TV series based on his novel, starring Sun Li and Tong Dawei.

== Plot ==
Yang Rui is a handsome Beijing executive who is bored with his easy life and numerous female conquests. He is having an affair with his female boss, and in general seems to despise women and relationships. He hears about a woman named He Yanhong who is from out of town, beautiful but mysterious and quite reclusive. He soon falls in love with her, despite the fact that she rejects his advances and appears to have few friends. When she kicks him in the head after coming on too strongly, she shows some regret and compassion, nursing him back to health and they develop a friendship. He Yanhong tells him her nickname is An Xin ("peace" in English). Unfortunately, Yang Rui's scorned female boss becomes jealous, reveals she has been spying on the young couple, arranges for He Yanhong to lose her job, reveals that she has a child, and then frames him for accepting an illegal kickback that briefly sends Yang Rui to prison.

He Yanhong arranges for a lawyer to free Yang Rui from prison, and he tracks her down, discovering that her real name is actually An Xin, and that she moved to Beijing to escape a disastrous love triangle that led to her former husband's death and threatens both her life and that of her child, Xiong. In revealing herself to Yang Rui, he learns the following:

An Xin was an up-and-coming police officer in Yunnan Province of southern China, engaged to a journalist named Tiejun who also has a promising career. Before the date of their marriage, An Xin has a chance encounter with Mao Jie, with whom she has a brief but emotionally intense romantic fling. Neither is honest about their career, and only during a drug sting operation does An Xin discover that Mao Jie is part of a drug dealing family. Since neither knew the other's true profession, she is forced to testify against Mao Jie and his parents receive the death penalty. However Mao Jie is able to convince a judge to set him free because of accusations that An Xin may have framed him to exit their now extinguished love affair. In retribution, Mao Jie and his brother kills An Xin's husband to avenge his parents' death and her betrayal.

From then on An Xin's life slowly unravels as she tries to build a new life while hiding from the Mao brothers.

== Cast ==
- Zhao Wei as An Xin
- Nicholas Tse as Maojie
- Liu Yunlong as Yang Rui
- Chen Jianbin as Tiejun
- Chen Abao as Tiejun's mother
- Dong Yangyang as Xiao Xiong (baby)
- Fu Qiang as Mao's father
- Gao Zhilan as Mao's mother
- Hong Jiantao as Liu Minghao
- Liu Guanghou as Lao Qian
- Lun Zhu sa Xiao Kang
- Niu Li as Zhong Ning
- Su Jiatong as Xiao Xiong (An Xin's son)
- Tang Jinglin as Mao Fang

== Reception ==
- "Despite plot twists that strain credulity, the film works, thanks mostly to Zhao's soulful performance as a cop torn between love, duty and motherhood. With her elfin stature, Zhao couldn't intimidate a jaywalker, but her convincing portrayal confirms her status as one of China's best actresses. Goddess's real success is its rewarding fusion of mainstream mainland actors with Hong Kong indie vision, pointing the way for future cross-border collaborations. When Zhao and Tse exchange smoldering glances (and occasional gunfire), one country, two systems never looked so good."--TIME(Asia edition)

== Awards and nominations ==
26th Moscow International Film Festival

- Nominated: Golden George

10th Golden Phoenix Awards

- Won: Female Actor Award (Zhao Wei)

5th Chinese Film Media Awards

- Nominated: Best Actress (Zhao Wei)
- Nominated: Best Supporting Actor(Sun Haiying)

27th Hundred Flowers Awards

- Nominated: Best Film
- Nominated: Best Actor (Sun Haiying)

8th Verona Film Festival

- Won: Audience Award
- Nominated: Best Film
