= Angel's Suitcase =

Angel's Suitcase 天使旅行箱

Studio album by Zhao Wei
- Released: 3 September 2007
- Genre: Mandopop
- Label: MBOX

Zhao Wei chronology
Double (2005)	Angel's Suitcase 天使旅行箱 (2007)	We're All Great Directors (2009)

Angel's Suitcase is an album by Zhao Wei. It marks the release of the first album by independent music studio MBOX. Wei directed the music video of the title track.

== Track listings ==
No.	Title	Composer(s)	Length
1.	"Old Toy(旧玩具)"	Chen Wei	4:27
2.	"Angel's Suitcase(天使旅行箱)"		4:02
3.	"Morning Love"		4:33
4.	"Love Yourself More(多爱自己一些)"		4:11
5.	"Cha Cha Love(恰恰爱)"		3:47
6.	"Butterfly(蝶)"		4:27
7.	"Little Bee(小蜜蜂)"		3:15
8.	"Leaves' Admire(树叶的崇拜)"	Ding Wei	3:54
9.	"Not Afraid(不怕)"		4:19
10.	"Little Love in Big City(大城小爱)"		4:10

== Accolades ==
Award	Category	Nominee	Result
The 8th Top Chinese Music Chart Awards	Best Female Artist - Mainland China	Zhao Wei	Won
Music Radio Top Chart Awards	Best All Around Artist	Zhao Wei	Won
Music Radio Top Chart Awards	Best Album		Won
Music Radio Top Chart Awards	Golden Melody of the Year	Angel's Suitcase	Won
Music Radio Top Chart Awards	Best Female Artist	Zhao Wei	Nominated
South Korea Seoul Asian Song Festival	Favorite Artist Mainland China	Zhao Wei	Won
YHC Pop Chart Awards	Favorite Album		Won
YHC Pop Chart Awards	Favorite Female Artist	Zhao Wei	Won
Sprite China Original Music Pop Chart Awards	Golden Melody of the Year	Angel's Suitcase	Won
