= Chinese Odyssey 2002 =

2002 Hong Kong film by Jeffrey Lau

- DVD cover of Chinese Odyssey 2002
- Traditional Chinese: 天下無雙
- Simplified Chinese: 天下无双
- Literal meaning: Matchless Under Heaven
- Hanyu Pinyin: Tiānxià Wúshuāng
- Jyutping: Tin1 Haa6 Mou4 Soeng1
- Directed by: Jeffrey Lau
- Written by: Jeffrey Lau
- Produced by: Wong Kar-wai; Jacky Pang; Charley Zhuo
- Starring: Tony Leung; Faye Wong; Zhao Wei; Chang Chen
- Cinematography: Peter Ngor
- Edited by: Wong Wing-Ming
- Music by: Frankie Chan
- Distributed by: Shanghai Film Group Corporation
- Release date: February 6, 2002
- Running time: 97 minutes
- Country: Hong Kong
- Languages: Cantonese; Mandarin
- Box office: HK$13.1 million

Chinese Odyssey 2002 is a 2002 Hong Kong mo lei tau musical film written and directed by Jeffrey Lau and produced by Wong Kar-wai. It stars Tony Leung Chiu-Wai, Faye Wong, Zhao Wei and Chang Chen. It is a parody of the 1959 Huangmei opera film The Kingdom and the Beauty. It was released during the Chinese New Year, following the practice of the Hong Kong movie industry to boost comedy ticket sales during the holiday season.

== Plot ==
The film is set in Ming Dynasty, China. Li Yilong is the town bully, known for his boorish manners and reckless attitude which have endeared him to no one, save his sister Feng who has a curious penchant for cross-dressing. It is apparent early on that both these siblings are such misfits they have virtually no prospect of marriage.

Princess Wushuang escaps the palace, disguised as a man, which fools both Long and Feng. Long immediately decides that he likes his new-found friend so much that he will entrust his sister's hand in marriage to "him". The princess tries to fend off Long's suggestions of a match; but also, she is attracted to Long.

Emperor Zheng De also leaves his palace temporarily to search for his missing sister. He dresses like a commoner and by a twist of fate meets Feng. He is smitten with Feng, and begins to court her, while keeping his imperial identity secret from her. His motives for leaving the palace also included the fact that he is unhappy and lonely at court and wants to escape the smothering influence of the Empress Dowager, his mother, who plays a dictatorial role in the actions of her son. A convoy of imperial guards try to protect him while he is out in town and bring the Emperor back to the palace, but unsuccessfully.

The Princess is also assisted by her "fairy godmother" in marrying her match. The Empress Dowager hears of her wayward children and storms Long's house, where her children are holed up, only to hear that they wish to marry two commoners with unwholesome and eccentric tendencies. The Emperor is adamant about marrying Feng and the Empress Dowager relents, but Long is unable to pass a "ring test" to prove he is the destined one and the Empress Dowager forbids his marriage to her daughter.

After a separation, Long is enlightened by the "fairy godmother" and passes the "ring test". He is reunited with the Princess, the Empress Dowager accepts him, and happiness reigns.

== Cast ==
- Tony Leung Chiu-Wai – Li Yilong, a ne'er-do-well
- Faye Wong – Princess Wushuang, the emperor's sister
- Zhao Wei – Phoenix, Li Yilong's sister
- Chang Chen – Zhengde Emperor
- Athena Chu – Amour Amour
- Rebecca Pan – the emperor's mother
- Eric Kot – the governor / bully
- Roy Cheung – Zuo Lengshan
- Jeffrey Lau – Principal Chen, Li Yilong's former teacher
- Ning Jing – Purple Afterglow, Li Yilong's ex-girlfriend
- Jan Lamb – commentary (voice)
- Chan Lung
- Wong Wing-Ming
- Zhong Hanhao

== Soundtrack ==
The soundtrack was a success for Faye Wong.

Chinese Odyssey 2002 Original Motion Picture Soundtrack

Soundtrack album by Frankie Chan & Roel A. Garcia (composers)
- Released: 1 February 2002
- Genres: Huangmei opera, comedy music
- Length: 64:31
- Label: EMI

Track list:

1. Intro (序曲) [1:04]
2. Out of the palace (出宮) [2:30]
3. Down to Jiangnan (下江南) [1:59] (vocals by Zhao Wei and Chang Chen)
4. Vicious mood (殺氣) [1:09]
5. The Large World is Smaller than Dust (天地之大小於塵埃) [1:31]
6. Xǐxīangféng (喜相逢; "Happy Gathering") [3:18] by Faye Wong and Tony Leung
7. Morning Dew (朝露) [2:35]
8. Cherishing the Body (善其身) [3:10]
9. Zuìyīchǎng (醉一場; "A Drunk Song") [2:24] by Faye Wong and Tony Leung
10. Happy Gathering Lalalalala (喜相逢啦啦啦啦啦) [3:16] (vocals by Zhao Wei and Chang Chen, "lalala" version of track #6)
11. Passing Glances (眼波流) [1:54]
12. Emotional Departure (離恨) [2:34]
13. The Peach Flower Oath (桃花為盟) [0:36]
14. Wind and Thunder on the Plains (平地有風雷) [0:31]
15. Magical Power of Love (愛有神奇力量) [1:23]
16. Fate Decided this Life (緣定今生) [3:20]
17. Drinking Alone (獨飲) [3:11]
18. Longing before the Shadows (觸影生情) [4:31]
19. Tiānxià Wúshuāng Tiānla Dìla (天下無雙天啦地啦) [2:14] by Faye Wong and Tony Leung
20. Tiānxià Wúshuāng Nàgèla Xiǎngshuō Lalala (天下無雙那個啦想說啦啦啦) [2:20] by Zhao Wei and Chang Chen (spoof of track #19)
21. Here's You; Here's Me (有你有我) [1:35]
22. The World is Great (人間天地好) [3:10]
23. Love will not Die (愛火不熄) [3:31]
24. Like the Previous Dust (如許前塵) [3:27]
25. No Turning Back (不回首) [2:54]
26. Happy Reunion under the Spring Flowers (春暖花開大團圓) [1:59] (vocals by Zhao Wei and Chang Chen)
27. Tinha Mouseung Tinla Deila (天下無雙天啦地啦) [2:15] by Faye Wong and Tony Leung (Cantonese version of track #19)

== Accolades ==
Organisation	Year	Category	Recipient	Result	Ref.
39th Golden Horse Awards	2002	Best Art Direction		Nominated	
39th Golden Horse Awards	2002	Best Costume Design		Nominated	
39th Golden Horse Awards	2002	Best Supporting Actress	Zhao Wei	Nominated	
22nd Annual Hong Kong Film Awards	2003	Best Art Direction	Tony Au Ting-Ping	Nominated	
22nd Annual Hong Kong Film Awards	2003	Best Costume Design	William Cheung Suk Ping	Nominated	
22nd Annual Hong Kong Film Awards	2003	Best Actress	Faye Wong	Nominated	
22nd Annual Hong Kong Film Awards	2003	Best Original Film Score	Frankie Chan and Roel A. Garcia	Nominated	
9th Annual Hong Kong Film Critics Society Awards	2002	Best Picture		Won	
9th Annual Hong Kong Film Critics Society Awards	2002	Best Actress	Faye Wong	Won	

== See also ==
- Hong Kong in films
