= Romance in the Rain =

2001 Chinese-Taiwanese television period drama

- Also known as: Profound Love in Heavy Rain
- Simplified Chinese: 情深深雨濛濛
- Literal meaning: Love Deep, Rain Misty
- Hanyu Pinyin: Qíng Shēnshēn Yǔ Méngméng
- Genre: Romance
- Based on: Fire and Rain by Chiung Yao
- Written by: Chiung Yao
- Directed by: Li Ping
- Starring: Zhao Wei; Leo Ku; Ruby Lin; Alec Su; Kou Zhenhai; Wang Lin; Yu Xing; Le Jiatong; Gao Xin; Li Yu
- Opening theme: "Qing Shenshen Yu Mengmeng" (情深深雨濛濛) performed by Zhao Wei
- Ending theme: "Hao Xiang Hao Xiang" (好想好想) performed by Leo Ku (or Zhao Wei) "Zi Cong Li Bie Hou" (自从离别后) performed by Zhao Wei, "Li Bie De Che Zhan" (离别的车站) performed by Zhao Wei, "Yan Yu Meng Meng" (烟雨濛濛) performed by Leo Ku
- Countries of origin: Taiwan; China
- Original language: Mandarin
- No. of episodes: 49

Production
- Executive producer: Ge Weidong
- Producer: Zhuang Liqi
- Production locations: Shanghai, China
- Cinematography: Chen Jun; Lin Jialiang
- Running time: 45 minutes
- Production companies: Yi Ren Communications; China International Television

Original release
- Network: China Television
- Release: April 3 – May 25, 2001

Related
- Lovers Under the Rain (1986)

Romance in the Rain is a 2001 Chinese-language television period drama co-produced by Yi Ren Communications Company (怡人傳播有限公司) in Taiwan and China International Television Corporation (中国国际电视总公司) in mainland China. The series was adapted by Chiung Yao from her 1964 novel Fire and Rain (as well as a 1986 adaptation Lovers Under the Rain), with the setting moved from 1960s in Taipei to 1930s in Shanghai. Romance in the Rain was filmed in Shanghai in 2000, and first broadcast in Taiwan on China Television in April 2001.

The series stars Zhao Wei, Ruby Lin, Leo Ku, and Alec Su, reuniting Zhao, Lin and Su after the 1998–1999 smash hit My Fair Princess. Romance in the Rain was also an international success in East Asia and Southeast Asia.

== Characters ==
(L-R): Su, Lin, Zhao and Ku in a promotional image.

=== Main cast ===
- Lu Yiping (陸依萍/陆依萍) or Bai Mei Gui (Stage Name), played by Zhao Wei

The protagonist of Romance in the Rain, Yiping is one of the many children of Lu Zhenhua, a retired general with nine wives. Her mother, Fu Wenpei, is the general's eighth wife. Both she and her mother are banished from the Lu household through the actions of her father's ninth wife, Wang Xueqin. She has ten half-sisters, including Ruping and Mengping, many half-brothers, including Erhao, and one stepbrother named Erjie. The mercilessness with which her father and stepmother treat her has made her resentful of the Lu family, which she refers to as the "other side." At first, she is at odds with her half-brother Erhao and half-sister Ruping for this reason, but she eventually learns to love and accept them as her siblings. She has one elder full sister called Xinping (陸心萍/陆心萍) who died 7 years before the plot of the story at 15 years of age. After an earlier encounter, she meets a reporter named He Shuhuan at a Shanghai nightclub. Shuhuan is soon captivated by Yiping's singing talent, emotion, and mystery. After discovering her half-sister Ruping's love for Shuhuan, she seeks Shuhuan's love, partly as revenge (as he discovers by reading her diary), but in her heart, she really loves him and so for He Shuhuan, her revenge become meaningless and she learns to be loving and forgiving of her father. When Yiping fell in love with Shuhuan and she softens as a result. After the death of her father, Yiping became the sole financial support of the Lu family as Erhao also enlists in the army. Yiping's character is loud and blunt, with a strong sense of righteousness and justice due to the misfortunes that she and her mother have suffered. She often describes herself as a porcupine who has grown spines as a mechanism of self-defense. In order to love Shuhuan, she pulls out her quills one by one, leaving her defenseless and a bloody mess.

- Lu Ruping (陸如萍/陆如萍), played by Ruby Lin

Ruping is the daughter of Lu Zhenhua and Wang Xueqin, as well as Yiping's half-sister. She is the full sister of Erhao and Mengping and half-sister of Erjie from her mother's side. Her mother, Xueqin, is her father's ninth and final wife. Pretty and sympathetic, Ruping comes from a wealthy environment but is not prejudiced against Yiping like the rest of her family. She gets angry, jealous, and upset at times, but in times of need, she always prioritizes other people's well-being before her own emotions. Ruping's first love interest is Shuhuan, whom she met after Shuhuan asks her to guard some negatives. At the same time, she also meets Du Fei, Shuhuan's colleague, who develops strong feelings for Ruping. During the series, Ruping is confronted with a series of misfortunes that make her believe that she is unloved. Shuhuan runs away from their engagement ceremony, her mother has been found guilty of committing adultery and stealing from their family's treasury, and after helping her mother escape imprisonment by contacting Wei Guangxiong, Ruping is the direct cause of the loss of all of the Lu family's savings, which earns her much anger and harsh words from her father. She runs away from home with her father's gun, intending to commit suicide. However, with the onset of war against the Japanese, she decides to join the Red Cross instead and becomes a nurse in the battlefield. During this time, she thinks about Du Fei every day and comes to realize that he is her one true love and has been for a long time. By coincidence, she and Du Fei meet again, and she is able to reveal her feelings. They end up holding a "battlefield wedding" and working together until the end of the war.

- He Shuhuan (何書桓/何书桓), played by Leo Ku

A reporter from Nanjing, Shuhuan is the friend and colleague of Lu Erhao and Du Fei as well as the love interest of sisters Lu Yiping and Lu Ruping. However, whereas his feelings towards Yiping are romantic, he only treats Ruping as a special friend. At the beginning of the series, he and Ruping are assumed to be potential partners by all their friends and family members. Xueqin is particularly adamant about this, often insisting that Ruping make a move to secure their relationship. Despite several arguments, and going back and forth between Yiping and Ruping, he remains passionate towards Yiping. After reading Yiping's diary and discovering that Yiping was only dating to get revenge on 'that side' of the family he was led to anger and broke up with her. He later is engaged to Ruping but leaves her during the engagement party for Yiping. He starts to love Lu Yiping after he knows that she loves him with sincere and innocent love. He regrets breaking her heart and so promised her to always believe her and to never break up with her again. Towards the end of the story, Shuhuan goes off to fight in the war between Japan and China, leaving Yiping to wait for him.

In the final episode, after arriving in China, Lu Yiping finds him, and Shuhuan runs to her and tells her "I love you" many times and then kisses her.

- Du Fei (杜飛/杜飞), played by Alec Su

Like Shuhuan, Du Fei is a reporter. He is extremely passionate about his love for Ruping, but Ruping attempts to reject his love. A caring man, Du Fei always helps others in need but is also careless and clumsy. During the war between Japan and China, Du Fei, upset by Ruping's disappearance, goes to the battlefield as a reporter in hopes of finding Ruping, and after several years discovers Ruping and her love for him and so marries her.

- Lu Erhao (陸爾豪/陆尔豪), played by Gao Xin

Erhao is the son of Lu Zhenhua and Xue Qin, brother to Ruping and Mengping, and half-brother to Yiping from his father and Erjie from his mother. He is the love interest of Yiping's best friend Fang Yu. However, his relationship with Fang Yu becomes complex after Erhao discovers that his past childhood love, Keyun, once had his child and is now mentally disabled. At the beginning of the series Erhao hated Yiping but for the sake of Fang Yu he tried hard to make peace with Yiping. He was able to put aside his hatred towards Yiping and grew to love and accept her as his sister and part of the family. Erhao later enlists in the army as well, leaving Fang Yu waiting for him.

- Fang Yu (方瑜), played by Li Yu

The best friend of Yiping who falls in love with Yiping's half-brother, Erhao. Yiping is at first against Fang Yu's relationship with Erhao, especially after finding out about Keyun, but Fang Yu continues to love Erhao despite complications in their relationship.

=== Supporting cast ===
- Li Keyun (李可雲/李可云), played by Xu Lu

The daughter of Li Zhengde and Li Yuzhen, Keyun had a childhood romance with Erhao which resulted in a pregnancy. She did not inform Erhao about this. After their baby's death, Keyun developed a mental illness. Throughout Romance in the Rain, Yiping, Shuhuan, Erhao, Ruping, Du Fei, and Fang Yu attempt to help Keyun recover her memory. In the end, Keyun gets better when she saw a motherless baby during the war. She decides to raise him as her own.

- Lu Zhenhua (陸振華/陆振华), played by Kou Zhenhai (Episode 01–45) Deceased

The father of Yiping, Lu Zhenhua is a retired, respected general. He was married to nine women, all of whom he eventually lost interest in. As a result of his tragic romance with Pingping, Lu Zhenhua is inclined to marry any woman who bears a resemblance to Pingping. It is revealed later after he died that the person who bore the closest resemblance towards his long-lost love Pingping was not his wives but his daughter, the deceased Xinping, the sister of Yiping and daughter of Wenpei who became his favorite daughter. Although his relationship with Yiping is tumultuous at the beginning, especially after he whips her, the two eventually build a strong bond through their similarities and as the series goes on Yiping grows to love him. He dies after getting shot while fighting off Japanese soldiers trying to protect Yiping and Shuhuan.

- Fu Wenpei (傅文佩), played by Xu Xing

The eighth wife of Lu Zhenhua, Fu Wenpei is gentle and moral compared to Zhenhua's ninth wife, Xueqin. After Zhenhua married Xueqin, he lost interest in Wenpei and eventually she was expelled from the Lu household. She and Zhenhua had two daughters: the deceased Xinping and Yiping. The death of Xinping brought great disturbance and grieve to her. She cannot forget about Xinping and always thinks of her much to Yiping's dismay who thought that she could never replace Xinping in Wenpei's heart. Wenpei is of noble character especially when she speaks for Wang Xueqin to Zhenhua even after she is always treated unfairly and badly by Wang Xueqin. She later becomes the mother figure to the children of Lu Zhenhua with Wang Xueqin, especially towards Mengping. At the beginning, Wenpei lives a modest life with Yiping.

- Wang Xueqin (王雪琴), played by Wang Lin (Episode 01–47) Arrested (Main Antagonist)

The ninth wife of Lu Zhenhua, Xueqin is devious and power-hungry. She also has an affair outside her marriage for more than ten years with a man named Wei Guangxiong which started in Harbin and continues when she moves to Shanghai unbeknownst to Zhenhua. Although Zhenhua has a strong interest in her at the beginning, eventually her negative actions cause him to change his feelings. After Zhenhua finds out of her affairs, she is locked up together with her youngest son Erjie. He also tries to shoot her, but is stopped by, surprisingly, Yiping and Shuhuan, who hate her the most. Xueqin tells Ruping to call Wei Guangxiong to rescue her. She is rescued, but is neglected later as Wei Guangxiong also loses interest in her. She and Zhenhua have three children: Lu Erhao, Lu Ruping, and Lu Mengping. Her youngest son, Erjie, is the result of her affair with Wei Guangxiong. She is eventually arrested after the arrest of Wei.

- Lu Mengping (陸夢萍/陆梦萍), played by Yue Tingting

The youngest daughter of Zhenhua and Xueqin. Mengping is the sister of Erhao and Ruping and half-sister of Yiping from her father and Erjie from her mother. Mengping is at first prejudiced towards Yiping like her mother, but later learns to love Yiping. She enjoys partying and having fun, but she is raped after a night of partying and loses fertility after abortion, and this causes her personality to change drastically. She turns more forgiving and eventually learns to accept Yiping as part of her family, later after the death of her father she lives with Yiping, Wenpei, Li Fuguan, Li sao, Keyun in the Lu mansion. She helps take care of the orphaned children whose parents were killed or separated during the war. Mengping later takes Wenpei as a mother figure.

She has a boyfriend, Ji Yao, who is off-screen and only mentioned in conversations; his whereabouts are not mentioned after her rape.

- Li Zhengde / Lieutenant Li (李正德 / 李副官), played by Cao Qiugen

One of Zhenhua's officers and most trusted person, Li Zhengde is also a retired soldier and living a quiet life in Shanghai. Originally he is an assistant to the Lu family; Li Zhengde and his family leave after discovering Keyun's pregnancy. For several years, Li Zhengde and his family are financially assisted by Yiping's mother, Wenpei, despite her own financial difficulty. Later Yiping takes a job as a singer in "Grand Shanghai" nightclub to support the family of Li Zhengde as well as herself and her mother.

- Qin Wuye (秦五爺/秦五爷), played by Huang Daliang

A wealthy businessman in Shanghai, Qin Wuye is the owner of a nightclub called "Grand Shanghai". When Yiping comes in search for work, Qin Wuye offers her a job to sing at his nightclub after being stunned by Yiping's attitude. Eventually, Yiping's relationship with Qin Wuye grows stronger and Yiping relies on him several times for assistance. Qin Wuye gave the job as a singer in the "Big Shanghai" during the war and during the financial crisis of the Lu family.

- Pingping (萍萍), played by Wang Yan (Episode 01 and 45) Deceased

Pingping was the daughter of a statesman whom the young Lu Zhenhua fell in love with. She returned his love and they promised to marry each other someday. However, furious about this, her father tried to kill Zhenhua but was stopped by his daughter. Lu Zhenhua later pursued his hopes to become a victorious general in order to marry Pingping. However, before he achieved this, Pingping committed suicide in order to avoid an arranged marriage, which had a powerful effect on Zhenhua. Witnessing the corruption of Qing Dynasty and the death of Pingping, Zhenhua decided to call up an uprising against the Qing Dynasty, which eventually made him become the general of North-eastern China. Because of his love for Pingping, Lu Zhenhua gives all of his twelve daughters a name that includes the character Ping (萍): Xinping (心萍), Yiping (依萍), Ruping (如萍), and Mengping (夢萍/梦萍).

- Wei Guangxiong (魏光雄) (Episode 01–47) Arrested (Primary Antagonist)

The adulterer of Wang Xueqin and biological father of Erjie, a small leader in a gang, who is revealed later never in love with Wang Xueqin but using her to steal the Lu family's wealth to fund his criminal activities. He is arrested with Xueqin due to arms dealing in the end of this show.

== Awards and nominations ==
Year	Event	Category	Recipient(s)	Result
2001	The 1st Top 10 China Television Artists Awards	Top Actress	Zhao Wei	Won
2002	The 2nd Top Chinese Music Chart Awards	Best Theme Song for a Movie or Television	Zhao Wei	Won

== International broadcast ==
- Taiwan — China Television (April 2001)
- Hong Kong — TVB (May 2001)
- South Korea — Gyeongin Broadcasting iTV (May 2001, as 안개비연가)
- China — China Central Television (September 2001)
- Singapore — Singapore Cable Vision (September 2001)
- Malaysia — RTM TV2 (December 2002)
- Vietnam — VTV3 (November 2001, as Tân dòng sông ly biệt)
- Indonesia — Indosiar (March 2002, as Kabut Cinta)
- Thailand — Channel 3 (2007, as มนต์รักในสายฝน)
- Philippines — Radio Philippines Network (January 2007), SolarFlix (2023, as A Kiss in the Rain)
- In mainland China, the series received the highest ratings of the year, with an average rating of 12% and the highest episode rating of 20%. (Source:AGB Nielsen) This was China International Television Corporation's first co-produced television series with Taiwan.

== Soundtrack ==
Most of the lyrics for songs were written by the writer, Chiung Yao, sung by Zhao Wei.

No.	Title	Lyrics	Music	Artist	Length
1.	"情深深雨濛濛" (Romance in the Rain)	Chiung Yao	Xu Jialiang (徐嘉良)	Zhao Wei
2.	"好想好想" (Miss You)	Chiung Yao	You Jingang (尤景仰)	Zhao Wei (or Leo Ku)
3.	"烟雨濛濛" (Misty Rain)	Chiung Yao	You Jingang (尤景仰)	Zhao Wei
4.	"小冤家" (Jambalaya)	Chiung Yao	unknown	Zhao Wei
5.	"偶然" (Occasionally)	Xu Zhimo (徐志摩)	Chen Qiuxia (陈秋霞)	Zhao Wei
6.	"往事难忘" (Long Long Ago)	Chiung Yao	unknown	Zhao Wei
7.	"新兰花草" (Orchid)	Hu Shih (胡适)	C.Tso (左宏元)	Zhao Wei
8.	"雨天的故事" (The Story of Raining Day)	Chiung Yao	C.Tso (左宏元)	Zhao Wei
9.	"离别的车站" (The Separation Station)	Chiung Yao	Xu Jialiang (徐嘉良)	Zhao Wei
10.	"满场飞圆舞曲" (Waltz Waltz)	Bao Yi (包乙)	unknown	Zhao Wei
11.	"不由自主" (Can't Help Myself)	Chiung Yao	Tu Huiyuan (涂惠元)	Zhao Wei
12.	"自从离别后" (Since I Leave You)	Chiung Yao	Guo Liang (郭亮)	Zhao Wei
