= A Time to Love (film) =

- Film poster
- Directed by: Huo Jianqi
- Written by: Si Wu; Zhang Renjie
- Produced by: He Ping; Han Sanping (e.p.); Yang Buting (e.p.)
- Starring: Zhao Wei; Lu Yi
- Cinematography: Ming Sun
- Edited by: Yang Tao
- Music by: Wang Xiaofeng
- Distributed by: China Film Group; Tokyo Theaters Company (Japan)
- Release dates: January 18, 2005 (Changchun Film Festival); February 13, 2005 (China)
- Running time: 113 minutes
- Country: China
- Language: Mandarin

A Time to Love (simplified Chinese: 情人结; traditional Chinese: 情人結; pinyin: Qĺngrén jié) is a 2005 Chinese romantic drama film directed by Huo Jianqi. It stars Zhao Wei and Lu Yi. The film is based on a true story.

== Plot ==
In a government compound, 11-year-old Hou Jia and a girl named Qu Ran grow up together. They are childhood sweethearts, innocent and inseparable. Before they know it, they're both 18—it's the early 1980s. Hou Jia and Qu Ran go to school together every day, and somewhere along the way, love quietly blossoms between them.

But they never expected that this childhood romance would be met with fierce opposition from both sets of parents. One step forward could leave everyone wounded, but stepping back feels impossible to bear. It's only when they stumble upon Shakespeare's Romeo and Juliet that a glimmer of hope appears. Their burning passion reignites, and they decide to immortalize their love with the vivid colors of youth. They vow to hold on.

But it doesn't last long. Their determination is soon defeated by the bonds of family. Left with no other choice, Hou Jia goes abroad for seven long years. Meanwhile, Qu Ran stubbornly spends those same seven years waiting for his return. Seven years later, Hou Jia returns to China only to find that Qu Ran's father has been diagnosed with cancer.

== Cast ==
- Zhao Wei ... Qu Ran
- Lu Yi ... Hou Jia
- Song Xiaoying ... Hou Jia's mother
- Zhang Qian... Quran's father

== Reception ==
Variety called the film "fairly standard Asian romantic fare". Heroic-Cinema.com were more positive and praised the imagery and cinematography of the film, as well as the performance of both Vicki Zhao Wei and Lu Yi. The reviewer for Beyond Hollywood saw Vicki Zhao as the star with Lu Yi playing an "average" role, and criticised the screenwriters for making the secondary characters one-dimensional and uninteresting.

== Awards and nominations ==
Awards
Award	Category	Name	Outcome
Shanghai International Film Festival	Golden Goblet	A Time to Love	Nominated
Shanghai International Film Festival	Best Actress	Zhao Wei	Won
Huabiao Awards	Outstanding Film	A Time to Love	Nominated
Huabiao Awards	Outstanding Actress	Zhao Wei	Won
Golden Rooster Awards	Best Supporting Actress	Song Xiaoying	Nominated
Golden Rooster Awards	Best Cinematography	Sun Ming	Nominated
Golden Rooster Awards	Best Art Direction	Cui Ren	Nominated
Changchun Film Festival	Best Film	A Time to Love	Nominated
Changchun Film Festival	Best Director	Huo Jianqi	Nominated
Changchun Film Festival	Best Actress	Zhao Wei	Won
Changchun Film Festival	Best Actor	Lu Yi	Nominated
Changchun Film Festival	Best Supporting Actress	Song Xiaoying	Won
Changchun Film Festival	Best Supporting Actor	Qian Zhang	Nominated
Changchun Film Festival	Best Cinematography	Sun Ming	Nominated
