= Ruby Lin filmography =

This is the filmography of the Taiwanese actress and producer Ruby Lin. After playing in various series and films, her production debut turned out to be a hit with viewers. The Chinese media considered Lin served as a shining example for star-turned-producer.

== As actress ==
=== Television ===
Year	Title	Role	Notes
1995	Taiwan Heavy Case Records	Xiao Jun	
1996	Story of Dragon Dynasty	Mo Yu	
1996	Taiwan Mysterious Affairs	Hu Xinbei	
1996	Angel's Dust	Yang Qingxin	
1996	Asian Flower Bud	Tang Yaxuan	
1996	Zhen Ai Yi Shi Qing	Peipei	
1997	The Root	Lai Xuezi	
1997	An Emergency Mission	Su Huiru	
1997	New Justice Bao: Plum Flower Thief	Feifeng Princess	
1997	Last Tango in Shanghai	Yi Fenglu	
1998	My Fair Princess	Xia Ziwei	
1998	Magic Chef	Hong Niang	
1999	Food Glorious Food	Sansan	
1999	My Fair Princess II	Xia Ziwei	Also theme song singer
2000	The Legend of Master Soh	Hong Qilian	
2000	The Duke of Mount Deer	Princess Jianning	Hong Kong TVB series
2001	Romance in the Rain	Lu Ruping	
2001	The New Adventures of Chor Lau-heung	Sikong Xing'er	
2002	Taiji Prodigy	Bing Xin	Taiwan version; guest appearance
2002	Only You	Si Jiayi	
2002	Wulung Prince	Wang Wengxu	Guest appearance
2003	Half Life Fate	Gu Manzhen	
2003	Boy & Girl	Su La	
2003	Flying Daggers	Xue Caiyue, Yun Niang	
2004	Amor de Tarapaca	Li Yiqiao	
2005	Magic Touch of Fate	Lin Xiaomei	China & Korea joint production
2006	Paris Sonata	Yu Manzhi	Also theme song singer
2006	Sound of Colors	Fu Jingjing	
2006	Star Boulevard	Mi Lu	China's 1st musical drama, also theme song singer
2009	The Legend and the Hero 2	Daji	
2009	Love in Sun Moon Lake	An'an	
2009	Da Li Princess	Duan Aiyue	
2009	Zhi Xian Ye Guang Ming	Liu Xiaoqian	Guest appearance
2009	Ancestral Temple	Zheng Xiuyun	Also theme song singer
2010	Three Kingdoms	Sun Shangxiang	
2010	Beauty's Rival in Palace	Empress Dou Yifang	Also theme song singer
2011	The Glamorous Imperial Concubine	Ma Fuya, Pan Yu, Mei Fei	Also producer and theme song singer
2011	New My Fair Princess	Xia Yuhe	Remake of My Fair Princess; guest appearance
2012	Drama Go! Go! Go!	Wang Ming Ming	Also producer
2012	Bloody Sky	Chen Xiangmei	Guest appearance
2012	Mazu	Guanyin	Guest appearance
2012	Su Dongpo	Wang Fu	Guest appearance
2012	Nine Rivers Into The Sea	Hai Li Shi	Guest appearance
2013	The Patriot Yue Fei	Li Xiao'e	
2013	Flowers in Fog	Xue Hua	Guest appearance
2014	Young Sherlock	Wu Zetian	Also artistic director
2014	The Way We Were	Tang Jia-Ni	Also producer
2014	Monopoly Exposure	Bang Dan	
2015	We Are in Love	Herself	Chinese version of "We Got Married"
2016	Magical Space-time	Xie Jia Xin	
2016	Singing All Along	Empress Yin Lihua	Also producer
2017	My Dear Boy	Luo Xiao Fei	Also producer
2019	Endless Love	Tang Jia-Ni	Cameo appearance
2019	National Treasure	Herself	Cultural exploration program, season 2
2020	I, Myself	Single Lady	Cameo appearance
2020	The Victims' Game	Li Ya-Jun	Special appearance
2021	The Arc of Life	Gong Ye Xiao Niao	Also producer
2021	Light the Night	Luo Yu-nong (Rose)	Also producer
2023	Copycat Killer	Yao Yaci	
2023	At The Moment	Lo Hsin-lan	
2027	The Good Life Little Bad Boy	TBA	

=== Television film ===
Year	Title	Role	Notes
2012	Forgotten	Wei An	Also producer
2014	Mother Mother	Xia Yu Rou	Also producer

=== Film ===
Year	Title	Director	Role	Notes
1995	School Days 校園敢死隊	Kevin Chu	Gong Zhu	Debut film
1999	My Wishes 心願	Lam Yee Hung	Mao Mei	
1999	Bad Girl Trilogy 惡女列傳之板凳皇后	Wen Yao-ting	Yige Mingxing	
1999	The Mirror 怪谈之魔镜	Siu Wing	Judy	Three-story omnibus film
2000	A Matter of Time 新賭國仇城	Ye Hong Wei	Mei Jiahui	
2000	Winner Takes All 大贏家	Clifton Ko	Wen Jing	
2000	China Strike Force 雷霆戰警	Stanley Tong	Ruby	
2001	Comic King 漫画風雲	O Sing-Pui	Chu Qi	
2001	Never Been To Me 雙面情人		Xiao Jing, Xiao Tong	
2002	Life Express 生死速遞	Blackie Ko	Sun Xinxin	
2002	Dragon's Love 龍兒	Alice Wang	Long'er	
2004	Love Trilogy 我爱天上人間	Derek Chiu Sung-Kei	Lui Hai	Aka 30 Fen Zhong Lian Yao
2005	One Stone and Two Birds 一石二鳥	Kevin Chu	Zhang Xinxin	
2005	DragonBlade 龍刀奇緣	Antony Szeto	Ba Liba	Dubbing actress
2009	Evening of Roses 夜玫瑰	Ng See-yuen	Xia Meigui	Digital film
2009	Sophie's Revenge 非常完美	Eva Jin	Lucy	
2010	You Deserve to Be Single 活該你單身	Cai Xin	Fei'er	Also theme song singer
2010	Driverless 無人駕駛	Zhang Yang	Wang Dan	
2012	Blood Stained Shoes 繡花鞋	Raymond Yip	Su Er	
2013	My Lucky Star 非常幸運	Dennie Gordon	Lucy	
2013	The House 樓	Li Yuan	Xia Li Dong	
2013	Fallen City 傾城	Huang Hong (actor)	Qin Xiaoxiong	
2014	Sweet Alibis 甜蜜殺機	Lien Yi-chi	Prospective wife	Guest appearance
2014	The House That Never Dies 京城81號	Raymond Yip	Xu Ru Qing	
2015	The Wonderful Wedding 大囍臨門	Huang Chao-Liang	Li Shu Fen	
2016	Phantom of the Theatre 魔宫魅影	Raymond Yip	Meng Sifan	Also producer
2016	The Precipice Game 魔輪	Wang Zao	Liu Chenchen	
2017	The Devotion of Suspect X 嫌疑人X的献身	Alec Su	Fang Meng	
2021	Miss Andy 迷失安狄	Teddy Chin	Su-He (Sophia)	Also executive producer

=== Dubbing ===
Year	Title	Role	Notes
2004	DragonBlade	Ba Liba	Mandarin version

=== Short film ===
Year	Title	Role	Notes
2015	2917 • Ruby, Re	Ruby Lin	20 minutes, advertisement for HTC
2019	Pine Love		Advertisement film for Dettol Brand in Reckitt Benckiser Group
2019	The long walk home	Herself	Literature film with novelist Mai Jia
2019	RPG		Also producer

=== Theatre ===
Year	Title	Dates	City, Theater
2010	Sweet Sweet Love (Tian Mi Mi)	May 7–9	Shanghai (debut)
2010	Sweet Sweet Love (Tian Mi Mi)	May 13–15	Hangzhou, Grand Theater
2010	Sweet Sweet Love (Tian Mi Mi)	May 19–23	Beijing, Poly Theater
2010	Sweet Sweet Love (Tian Mi Mi)	June 4–5	Shenzhen, Grand Theater
2010	Sweet Sweet Love (Tian Mi Mi)	July 17–18	Nanchang, JiangXi Art Theater

=== Huangmei opera ===
Year	Title	Role	Notes
2000	Butterfly Lovers	Zhu Yingtai	

== As director or producer ==
In 2009, Lin sought to have greater control over her career by forming her own production, Ruby Studio. For its debut production she bought the rights to the popular novel Qing Shi Huang Fei (倾世皇妃) - The Glamorous Imperial Concubine, a story about the power struggles during the Five Dynasties and Ten Kingdoms period. It was reported that Lin attracted a great deal of investment in the production and assembled a team of male stars. All casts are invited by herself. She also invited director Gao Xixi as an investor of the series. He make consultant for the fighting sequences and battles befitting to the brutal warring period.

Filming began on January 15, 2011 in Hengdian World Studios, China. The series started airing on 30th, October 2011 on Hunan TV's golden time (China's second biggest television network). According to the China audience rating survey CSM27, it recorded the highest viewing rate from the first episode. According to the Shanghaidaily news, one week after screening domestically, it made back all of its 100 million yuan investment.

In December 2011, as a result of high rating and positive receptions, Lin won "Best producer" for her producing at 2011 Youku drama awards. Also she was crowned Best Actress and The Glamorous Imperial Concubine was selected as top 10 TV series of the year. Following her performance in The Glamorous Imperial Concubine, Lin extended her production business to romantic TV series and micro films in China and Taiwan. In June 2012, Lin held a press conference at Shanghai TV Festival for her upcoming projects.

Since the establishment of the Ruby Lin studio in 2010, Lin has produced 11 TV series and films which have been nominated for numerous awards. In September 2015, her production The Way We Were had a triumphant showing at Taiwan's the 50th Golden Bell Awards, with three victories for Best Television Series, Director and Supporting Actress. Chinese media considered Lin served as a shining example for star-turned-producer.

Year	Title	Release date	Notes	Role
2011	The Glamorous Imperial Concubine	September 2012	TV series	Producer
2012	Drama Go! Go! Go!	November 2012	TV series	Producer
2012	Forgotten	May 2012	Television film	Producer
2013	Painted Skin: The Resurrection	April 2013	TV series	Artistic director
2014	Young Sherlock	June 2014	TV series	Artistic director
2014	Mother Mother	May 2014	Television film	Producer
2014	The Way We Were	July 2014	TV series	Producer
2016	Singing All Along	July 2016	TV series	Producer
2017	My Dear Boy	December 2017	TV series	Producer
2020	Miss Andy	March 2020	Film	Executive producer
2021	The Arc of Life	January 2021	TV series	Producer
2021	Light the Night	November 2021	TV series	Producer
2023	Light the Wild	April 2023	TV Reality Show	Producer
2023	Starlight BNB	June 2023	TV Reality Show	Producer
2023	Living	September 2023	TV series	Producer

== Other works ==
=== Hosting ===
Year	Title	Notes
2006	Kangxi Lai Le	Host for 10 episodes
2012	Woman Like a Song	Guest host
2015	Kangxi Lai Le	Guest host

=== Television show ===
Year	Title	Role	Notes
2015	We Are in Love	Herself	Chinese version of "We Got Married"
2015	Hurry Up, Brother	Herself	Season 3, Episode 5
2016	Twenty Four Hours	Herself	Season 1, Episode 5
2019	National Treasure	Herself	Cultural exploration program, Season 2
2019	The Inn	Herself	Season 3
2023	Light The Wild	Herself	Also Producer. Spin-off of TV series Light The Night
2023	Starlight BNB	Herself	Also Producer. Spin-off of TV series Light The Night
2023	Our Wonderful Life	Herself	Mango TV Variety Show

=== Music videos ===
Year	Title	Artist	Notes
1996	It's Not All My Fault To Love Him	Winnie Hsin	
2009	Lover's Song	Peter Ho	
2014	We're All Different, Yet the Same	Jolin Tsai	
2016	Some Time After	FanFan	
2021	Finally	Accusefive	
