= List of awards and nominations received by Ruby Lin =

This is a list of awards and nominations for Ruby Lin, whose acting career in film, television, producing and music career.

== Film and television awards ==
=== Television ===
Asian Television Awards
| Year | Nominated work | Category | Result |
|---|---|---|---|
| 2015 | The Way We Were | Best Actress | Nominated |

Seoul International Drama Awards
| Year | Nominated work | Category | Result |
|---|---|---|---|
| 2010 | Beauty's Rival in Palace | People's Choice - Popular Actress | Won |
| 2013 | The Patriot Yue Fei | Favorite China Actress | Nominated |
| 2015 | The Way We Were | Asia Star Award | Nominated |

Golden Bell Awards
| Year | Nominated work | Category | Result |
|---|---|---|---|
| 2015 | The Way We Were | Best Actress | Nominated |
| 2015 | The Way We Were | Best Television Series | Won |
| 2022 | Light the Night | Best Actress | Nominated |
| 2022 | Light the Night | Best Television Series | Nominated |
| 2024 | Living | Best Television Series | Won |

TV Drama Awards Made in China
| Year | Nominated work | Category | Result |
|---|---|---|---|
| 2010 | Beauty's Rival in Palace | Favorite Actress | Won |
| 2011 | The Glamorous Imperial Concubine | Best Producer | Won |
| 2012 | Drama Go! Go! Go! | Actress with Most Rallying Power | Won |
| 2013 | The Patriot Yue Fei | Favorite Character | Nominated |
| 2015 | The Way We Were | Actress with Most purchasing Power | Won |

Golden Eagle Award
| Year | Nominated work | Category | Result |
|---|---|---|---|
| 2014 | The Patriot Yue Fei | Favorite HK/TW Actress | Nominated |

Huading Awards
| Year | Nominated work | Category | Result |
|---|---|---|---|
| 2012 | The Glamorous Imperial Concubine | Best Actress | Nominated |
| 2012 | The Glamorous Imperial Concubine | Favorite Actress | Nominated |
| 2014 | The Patriot Yue Fei | Best Actress in Ancient TV Drama | Nominated |
| 2016 | | Best Actress in TV Drama | Won |

Top Chinese TV Drama Awards
| Year | Nominated work | Category | Result |
|---|---|---|---|
| 2006 | | Favorite Actress | Won |

Vietnam DAN Awards
| Year | Nominated work | Category | Result |
|---|---|---|---|
| 2010 | Beauty's Rival in Palace | Favorite Taiwanese Actress | Won |
| 2011 | The Glamorous Imperial Concubine | Favorite Taiwanese Actress | Won |
| 2012 | The Glamorous Imperial Concubine | Favorite Actress | Won |
| 2012 | The Glamorous Imperial Concubine | Favorite TV Drama Character | Won |

Fujian Television Awards
| Year | Nominated work | Category | Result |
|---|---|---|---|
| 2009 | Da Li Princess | Favorite Actress | Nominated |

Youku Awards
| Year | Nominated work | Category | Result |
|---|---|---|---|
| 2011 | The Glamorous Imperial Concubine | Best Actress | Won |
| 2011 | The Glamorous Imperial Concubine | Best Producer | Won |

Jeanwest Entertainment Awards
| Year | Nominated work | Category | Result |
|---|---|---|---|
| 2012 | The Glamorous Imperial Concubine | Most Influential Actress | Won |

Asian Idol Awards
| Year | Nominated work | Category | Result |
|---|---|---|---|
| 2012 | The Glamorous Imperial Concubine | Best Producer | Won |

China TV Star Awards
| Year | Nominated work | Category | Result |
|---|---|---|---|
| 2014 | | Outstanding Actress (TW/HK Region) | Won |

Dragon TV's "Wind from the East" Awards
| Year | Nominated work | Category | Result |
|---|---|---|---|
| 2015 | The Way We Were | Best TV producer | Won |

QQ Star Awards
| Year | Nominated work | Category | Result |
|---|---|---|---|
| 2006 | | Most Stylish TV Actress | Won |
| 2010 | Beauty's Rival in Palace | Favorite Actress | Won |
| 2010 | Beauty's Rival in Palace | Most popular TV Actress | Won |

=== Film ===
Shanghai International Film Festival
| Year | Nominated work | Category | Result |
|---|---|---|---|
| 2009 | You Deserve to Be Single | Press Prize for Best Actress | Nominated |

Huading Awards
| Year | Nominated work | Category | Result |
|---|---|---|---|
| 2011 | Sophie's Revenge | Best Supporting Actress | Won |
| 2018 | The Devotion of Suspect X | Best Actress | Won |

Beijing Youth Film Festival for public welfare
| Year | Nominated work | Category | Result |
|---|---|---|---|
| 2013 | Fallen City | Favorite Actress | Won |

Beijing College Student Film Festival
| Year | Nominated work | Category | Result |
|---|---|---|---|
| 2004 | Love Trilogy | Favorite Actress | Nominated |

== Music awards ==
Music Radio Top Chart Awards
| Year | Nominated work | Category | Result |
|---|---|---|---|
| 2009 | New Rubyology | Favorite Female Artist | Nominated |
| 2009 | New Rubyology | Best Song of the Year | Nominated |

South-East Music Chart Awards
| Year | Nominated work | Category | Result |
|---|---|---|---|
| 2004 | Half a Lifetime's New and Best Songs | Best Theme Song of Television Series | Won |

M-Zone Music Awards
| Year | Nominated work | Category | Result |
|---|---|---|---|
| 2008 | New Rubyology | Golden Melody Song of the Year | Won |
| 2008 | New Rubyology | All-round Artist | Won |

RTHK Top 10 Gold Songs Awards
| Year | Nominated work | Category | Result |
|---|---|---|---|
| 1999 | Heartbeat | Best new female prospect award | Won |

Jade Solid Gold Best Ten Music Awards Presentation
| Year | Nominated work | Category | Result |
|---|---|---|---|
| 1999 | Heartbeat | Most Popular New Singer award (Bronze) | Won |

Metro Radio Hits Music Awards Presentation
| Year | Nominated work | Category | Result |
|---|---|---|---|
| 1999 | Heartbeat | New Singer Award | Won |

== Fashion awards ==
- 2001 Watsons Beauty Awards : Most Beautiful Female actress
- 2005 List of top 10 Most Popular Commercial Models in China
- 2006 QQ Annual Entertainment Star award : Most Stylish Actress
- 2006 MTV Style Gala : Most Stylish Actress of the Year
- 2007 China Fashion Awards : Outstanding Contribution to Charity Prize
- 2007 Cosmo Beauty Awards : Best Makeup Artist
- 2010 Fashion Weekly Awards : Most Charming Actress of the Year
- 2011 LUX Fashion Power Awards : Most favorite Stylish Actress

== Other awards ==
- 2001 Malaysia Heavenly Kings & Queens : Top 10 Artist (4th place)
- 2003 CCTV 1 & CCTV 8 : Top 10 Artists of the Year
- 2006 Tom Hero Award : Top 4 Actress of the Year
- 2007 BQ Big Name Annual Award : Most Popular Actress
- 2009 China Charity Star Award : Children's Most Favorite Star
- 2009 China Forbes Magazine Award : Charity Star of the Year
- 2009 China International Commercial and Art Awards : Most Powerful Spoke-person Star
- 2010 Seoul International Tourism Awards : Contribution Foreign Artist
- 2016 Women's Media Award : Influential Woman of the Year
