= Eighteen Springs =

Eighteen Springs may refer to:

- The Wonderful Widow of Eighteen Springs, a song for voice and closed piano by John Cage, based on James Joyce's Finnegans Wake
- Half a Lifelong Romance, a 1948 Chinese novel by Eileen Chang, also known as Eighteen Springs
  - Eighteen Springs (film), a 1997 China-Hong Kong film based on Chang's novel
  - Affair of Half a Lifetime, a 2002 adaptation of Chang's novel
- Eighteen Springs (album), by Ruby Lin, 2004
