= Lu Yi (actor) =

Chinese actor and singer (born 1976)

- Born: 6 January 1976 (age 50); Shanghai, China
- Education: Shanghai Theatre Academy
- Occupations: Actor; Singer
- Years active: 1985–1988, 1998–present
- Agent: Zhejiang Xinghe Culture Agency
- Spouse: Bao Lei (鲍蕾) (m. 2006)
- Children: 2

Chinese name
- Traditional Chinese: 陸毅
- Simplified Chinese: 陆毅
Transcriptions
Standard Mandarin
- Hanyu Pinyin: Lù Yì
- Musical career
- Genres: Mandopop

Lu Yi (Chinese: 陆毅, born 6 January 1976) is a Chinese actor and pop singer.

Lu ranked 38th on Forbes China Celebrity 100 list in 2015, and 47th in 2017.

== Early life ==
Lu Yi was born in Shanghai, China. He made his debut in the film "Spring Ding-dong" when he was five years old. Since then, Lu has acted in many films and television series. In Grade 8, Lu began to learn Peking Opera and Chinese Kung Fu. At the age of 14, Lu was admitted to the Shanghai Children Art Theatre, and has appeared in more than 70 stage plays.

== Career ==
Lu made his debut in the television series, Never Close the Eye. Then still a student at Shanghai Theatre Academy, Lu was launched to national stardom. He won the Best Actor and Most Popular Actor awards in the Golden Eagle Awards.

His following works established his position in the industry. In 2001, he starred in the popular period piece Love Story in Shanghai and played Bao Jingtian in historical drama Young Justice Bao II. The subsequent year, he won the Best Actor award at the Top Ten China TV Arts for his performance in the youth drama Field of Dreams. His 2003 drama, Boy & Girl which co-stars Ruby Lin became the highest rated drama of the year. Lu also ventured to films, starring in romantic film Fall in Love at First Sight (2002) alongside Fan Bingbing and A Time to Love with Zhao Wei – both earned him nominations at prestigious award ceremonies such as the Hundred Flowers Award and Changchun Film Festival. Lu also featured in Tsui Hark's wuxia film Seven Swords.

Lu's following works were successful, and established him as one of China's premier actors. He starred in wuxia series Eight Heroes, sports racing drama Fast Track Love as well as Harbin under the Curtain of Night, which became a surprise hit and Lu impressed many with his portrayal of a tough worker. In 2009, Lu starred in the popular idol drama My Youthfulness.

From 2010, Lu tried to break out of his idol mold by taking on more serious roles. He starred as Zhuge Liang in the historical drama Three Kingdoms (2010) directed by Gao Xixi, which received widespread acclaim. He also played Su Dongpo in the biopic of the same name, which was released in 2012. The series received positive reviews, and was named one of the Outstanding Television Series by SAFRT. The same year, he won the Golden Phoenix Awards for his performance in the war film The Sino-Japanese War at Sea 1894.

However, from 2013 to 2015, Lu returned to his idol drama roots. He starred in historical romance series Palace 3: The Lost Daughter (2014) with Mabel Yuan and Love Yunge from the Desert (2015) with Angelababy. Both series earned high ratings and Lu experienced a rise in popularity.

In 2017, Lu starred in the hit political drama In the Name of People. He played the protagonist, a detective who unearthed corruption within a fictional Chinese city. The drama broke ratings record in China and was even featured in BBC News. He won the Best Actor in the revolutionary era drama genre at the Huading Awards for his performance.

In 2019, Lu starred in the spy drama Lie Xiao.

== Personal life ==
Lu Yi married actress Bao Lei in 2006 after a long time of dating since college. They have 2 daughters.

== Filmography ==
=== Film ===
Year	English title	Chinese title	Role	Notes
1985	The Zhang Family's Daughter-in-Law	张家少奶奶	Lailai	
2002	Fall in Love at First Sight	一见钟情	Lao Bu	
2004	Love Trilogy	我爱天上人间	Liu Baisheng	
2004	Sex and the Beauties	求爱上上签	Gutsie	
2004	Fidelity	兄弟	Han Yu	
2004	Jasmine Women	茉莉花开	Zou Jie	
2005	A Time to Love	情人结	Hou Jia	
2005	Seven Swords	七剑	Han Zhibang	
2007	Anna & Anna	安娜与安娜	Ouyang	
2008	Fit Lover	爱情左右	lawyer	
2010	Confucius	孔子	Ji Sunfei	
2010	Beauty on Duty	美丽密令	Lu Chi-on	
2010	Aftershock	唐山大地震	Yang Zhi	Cameo
2010	The Stool Pigeon	线人	Hua Tian	
2010	My Ex-wife's Wedding	跟我的前妻谈恋爱	Zhang Qi	
2012	The Sino-Japanese War at Sea 1894	一八九四·甲午大海戰	Deng Shichang	
2012	Tears in Heaven	新妈妈再爱我一次	Mi Yifan	
2013	The Palace	宮鎖沉香	Yinzhen	Cameo
2014	Fighting	英雄之戰	Gao Zhihang	
2015	Where Are We Going, Dad? 2	爸爸去哪儿2		
2016	Book of Love	北京遇上西雅图之不二情书	Zheng Yi	

=== Television series ===
Year	English title	Chinese title	Role	Notes
1995	Pure Red Heart	血色童心	Xie Liaosha	
1996	Number One Love in the World	天下第一情	Yuan Fang	
1998	A World of Misty Rain	煙雨紅塵	Qiao Dawei	
1999	Never Close the Eye	永不瞑目	Xiao Tong	
2000	Spring in Summer	夏日恋语录	Ban Jun	
2001	Young Justice Bao II	少年包青天II	Bao Zheng	
2001	Love Story in Shanghai	像霧像雨又像風	Li Yingqi	
2002	Network Love Story	e网情深	Tao Kan	
2002	Meeting Aquarium	海洋馆的约会	Du Wei	
2002	Field of Dreams	壮志雄心	Ou Li	
2002	Behind the Vanity	浮华背后	Luo Liang	
2003	Pink Ladies	粉红女郎	Bai Yutang	
2003	Boy & Girl	男才女貌	Qiu Shi	
2004	The Blue Lotus	花樣的年華	Zhou Zihao	
2005	A Chance of Sunshine	向左走向右走	Sheng Shitao	
2006	Eight Heroes	八大豪侠	Ping Chang	
2006	Fast Track Love	车神	Zhang Jiaxiang	
2007	The Family	家	Gao Juehui	
2008	Harbin Enveloped in Darkness	夜幕下的哈爾濱	Wang Yimin	
2009	My Youthfulness	我的青春谁做主	Zhou Jin	
2010	Locust Tree	大槐樹	Lin Yi	
2010	Three Kingdoms	三國	Zhuge Liang	
2010	Iron Masked Singer	鐵面歌女	Bai Yiming	
2011	Cover	掩護	Gao Zhihua	
2012	No. 19 Huangliang Hutong	皇糧胡同19號	Tan Mingwang	Cameo
2012	Heaven Show	天堂秀	Kuang Liang	
2012	Su Dongpo	蘇東坡	Su Shi	
2013	Longmen Express	龍門鏢局	Cheng Mingzhang	Cameo
2013	If By Life You Were Deceived	假如生活欺骗了你	Li Yang	
2014	Palace 3: The Lost Daughter	宮鎖連城	Fucha Hengtai	
2015	Grow Up	长大	Zhou Ming	
2015	Love Yunge from the Desert	大漢情緣之雲中歌	Liu Fuling	
2015	The Legend of Qin	秦時明月	Ge Nie	
2016	Don't Go Breaking My Heart	致单身男女	Fang Qihong	
2016	Rookie Agent Rouge	胭脂	Zhou Yuhao	
2017	In the Name of People	人民的名义	Hou Liangping	
2017	Blind Date	盲约	Yang Shuo	
2018	Entering a New Era	风再起时	Fang Bangyan	
2019	Spy Hunter	天衣无缝	Zi Liqun	Special appearance
2019	Kiss, Love and Taste	亲·爱的味道	An Wenyu	
2020	Together	在一起		
2020	Fate	只为那一刻与你相见	Shao Mingzhe	
2020	Lie Xiao	猎枭	Wei Bangrui	

== Discography ==
=== Albums ===
Year	English title	Chinese title	Notes
2003	Phenomenal	非同寻常	
2005	Unfinished Yi	毅犹未尽	

=== Singles ===
Year	English title	Chinese title	Album	Notes
2001	"Love at First Sight"	一见钟情	Fall in Love at First Sight OST	
2002	"Field of Dreams"	壮志雄心	Field of Dreams OST	
2002	"Intuition"	直觉	Beyond the Vanity OST	
2002	"Inspiring Youth"	飞扬的青春	The Blue Lotus OST	
2005	"The Next Second"	下一秒	Fast Track Love OST	
2008	"My Gift"	我的礼物	—N/a	
2014	"War of Heroes"	英雄之战	Fighting OST	
2015	"In Support of the Love"	爱的供养	Palace 3: The Lost Daughter OST	

== Awards and nominations ==
Year	Award	Category	Nominated work	Result	Ref.
2000	China TV Golden Eagle Award	Best Actor	Never Close the Eye	Won	
2000	China TV Golden Eagle Award	Most Popular Actor	Never Close the Eye	Won	
2002	Hundred Flowers Award	Best Actor	Fall in Love at First Sight	Nominated	
2006	Changchun Film Festival	Best Actor	Time to Love	Nominated	
2013	Golden Phoenix Awards	Society Award	The Sino-Japanese War at Sea 1894	Won	
2016	Huading Awards	Best Actor	The Legend of Qin	Nominated	
2017	Huading Awards	Best Actor (Revolutionary-Era Drama)	In the Name of People	Won	
