= Mother Mother (disambiguation) =

Mother Mother (formed in 2005) are a Canadian band.

Mother Mother may also refer to:

- "Mother Mother" (song), 1996 song by Tracy Bonham
- Mother Mother (2014 film), a Taiwanese television film directed by Lin Guan Hui
- Mother Mother (2024 film), a Somali-Canadian drama film directed by K'naan Warsame
- Mother———! Mother———!!, a 1980 album by Clark Terry
