= Yang Ziting =

Chinese film director

- 杨紫婷
- Born: March 31, 1983 (age 43); Harbin, Heilongjiang
- Education: Central Academy of Drama
- Occupation: Film director
- Years active: 2009 - present

Yang Ziting (Chinese: 杨紫婷) (born 31 March 1983) is a film director, screenwriter, producer, and actor from western China.

== Biography ==
=== Early life and education ===
Yang Ziting was born 31 March 1983 in Harbin, Heilongjiang, China. She studied acting at the Central Academy of Drama.

=== Career ===
Yang began her career as an actor. She appeared in 2005–2006 in the television series Star Boulevard, considered novel for its use of musical performance and the story within a story device. Her first film appearance was in 2007 as the female lead in Revolution to the End, a film that used black comedy to portray the 1934–1935 events of the Long March of the Chinese Civil War. She was shortlisted for the Asian New Talent Award for Best Actress at the Shanghai International Film Festival that year for her portrayal of Ah Shan.

In October 2009 Yang made her directorial debut with the zany comedy Beauty of Chongqing. The film was noted for being the first to be made entirely by professionals born after 1980. In the leadup to the film's release, she appeared in a set of sexually charged "mirror movies" portraying herself giving direction to male actors. The vignettes received over 10 million views and provoked discussion of social mores and her role as a young woman working in a field dominated by men. That year she also directed a public service film Miao Meng's Life with support from the Red Cross Society of China in celebration of the 60th anniversary of the Proclamation of the People's Republic of China. The love story was designed to promote voluntary service through the Red Cross. Her film Decrepit Dream was screened at the Venice Film Festival. In 2013, she directed the romantic comedy film Look around. In 2016 she played a supporting role in Ten Years to Be Married.

=== Filmography ===
==== Film ====
Year	Title	Role	Notes	Ref.
2007	Revolution to the End (Chinese: 革命到底; pinyin: Gémìng dàodǐ)	A Shan (Chinese: 阿山)		
2009	Beauty of Chongqing (Chinese: 重庆美女; pinyin: Chóngqìng měinǚ)	—	Director	
2009	Wonderful Day Mongolia / Miao Meng's Life (Chinese: 妙濛的日子; pinyin: Miào méng de rìzi)	—	Director	
2012	Decrepit Dream (Chinese: 残梦; pinyin: Cán mèng)	Meng Xiaomeng	Actor, director, writer, producer	
2013	Look around (Chinese: 打望; pinyin: Dǎ wàng)	—	Director	
2016	Ten Years to Be Married (Chinese: 待嫁十年; pinyin: Dài jià shí nián)	Gu Sha Sha		

==== Television ====
Year	Title	Role	Notes	Ref.
2006	Star Boulevard (Chinese: 星光大道; pinyin: Xīngguāng dàdào)	Le Man Yao		
