= Queenie Tai =

Taiwanese actress

- 戴君竹
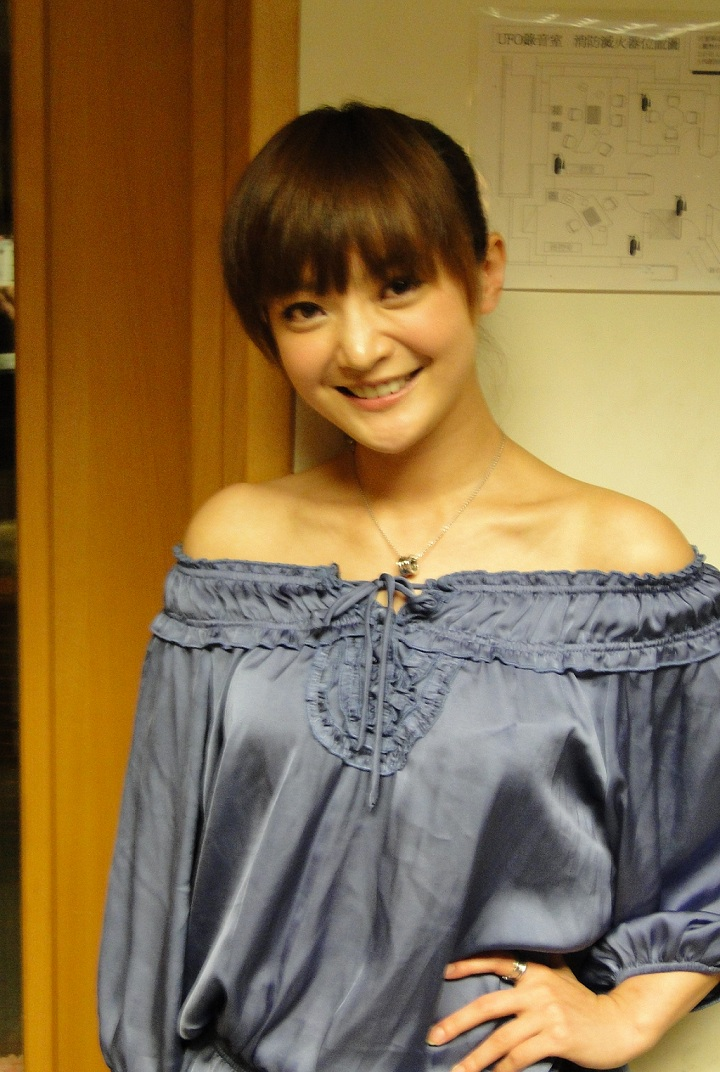
- Born: 11 September 1982 (age 43); Taipei, Taiwan
- Education: Aletheia University (BA); Baruch College
- Occupation: actress
- Spouse: Edison Huang (m. 2012)

Queenie Tai (Chinese: 戴君竹; pinyin: Dài Jūnzhú) is a Taiwanese actress.

== Filmography ==
=== Film ===
Year	English title	Original title	Role	Notes
2013	The Stolen Years	被偷走的那五年		
2014	Mother Mother	我的妈妈	Zhu Pin Tang	

=== Television series ===
Year	English title	Original title	Role	Notes
2004	The Outsiders	鬥魚	Shao Xiao Die	
2006	Angel Lover	天使情人	Tang Tang	
2009	Letter 1949	我在1949，等你	Han Wei / Qiao Yan-Qing	
2014	The Way We Were	16個夏天	Ge Qing	
2016	Singing All Along	秀丽江山之长歌行	Hupo	

== Personal life ==
On 30 June 2012, Tai married Edison Huang.
