= My Wishes =

- Directed by: Lam Yee Hung
- Written by: Lam Yee Hung
- Produced by: Titus Ho
- Starring: Ruby Lin; Deric Wan; Heung Ngan; Wong Yue Man
- Release date: 1999
- Running time: 90 minutes
- Country: China
- Languages: Cantonese; Mandarin

My Wishes (Pinyin: Xin Yuan) is a 1999 Chinese film directed by Lam Yee Hung. It also called as 為你瘋狂 (Pinyin: Wei Ni Feng Kuang)

== Plot ==
This is a movie about celebrity, fandom, and "misplaced" devotion.
