= The House (2013 film) =

- Directed by: Yuan Li
- Starring: Ruby Lin
- Production companies: Shanghai Film Group; Zhezhang Yongle Production
- Distributed by: Shanghai Shanjia Entertainment Co. ltd
- Release date: March 28, 2013 (China)
- Running time: 86 minutes
- Country: China
- Language: Mandarin
- Box office: US$0.5 million

The House (Chinese: 楼) is a 2013 Chinese thriller film directed by Yuan Li. It is about a web-novelist's experiences in a house that is said to be haunted.

== Cast ==
- Ruby Lin
- Patrick Tam
- Victor Chen
- Na Wei
- Cheung Tat-ming
- Miao Haojun
- Bai Liuxi
