= Evening of Roses =

- Film poster
- Directed by: Ng See-yuen; Hu Yue
- Written by: Hu Yue
- Based on: Evening of Roses by Pi Zhi Cai
- Produced by: Zhang Yifan; Ng See-yuen
- Starring: Ruby Lin; Wallace Chung
- Cinematography: Sun Ming; Yin Yue
- Edited by: Xie Ping; Lu Yue Lin
- Music by: Fu Ke; Luo Jian
- Production companies: Beijing Film Studio; China Film Group Corporation
- Release date: 6 March 2009
- Running time: 100 minutes
- Country: China
- Language: Mandarin

Evening of Roses (Chinese: 夜玫瑰; pinyin: Ye Mei Gui), also released as Night Rose, is a 2009 Chinese film by Hong Kong director Ng See-yuen and Hu Yue. It was adapted from a novel from Taiwanese writer Pi Zhi Cai. The film was given the official English title Night Rose.

Evening of Roses is set and was filmed in Beijing, China. It uses digital cinematography. It is Ma Tianyu's debut film.

== Plot ==
A man named Ke Zhi Hong (Wallace Chung) moves into a new apartment. His initially horny landlord, whose Chinese name sounds similar to the words for "Evening Rose", Ye Mei Gui (Ruby Lin), lets him rent one room of the apartment because her dog likes him. She reminds him of his dream girl from his university years, who was his senior by one year and taught him to dance the Jewish dance "Evening Rose".

He gradually falls in love with his landlord, but he continues to dwell on his memories of the past "Evening Rose". In the end, he realizes that he remembers the past "Evening Rose" because the name "Evening Rose" reminds him of the feeling of love, and he falls into the arms of the present "Evening Rose".

== Release ==
Evening of Roses first screened on February 14, 2009. It was limited-market release for Valentine's Day. It opened nationally in China on March 6.

== Cast ==
- Ruby Lin as Ye Meigui
- Wallace Chung as Ke Zhihong
- Ma Tianyu as Lan Heyan
- Ni Hongjie
- Jia Nailiang
