= Magic Touch of Fate =

- Created by: Jang Su-bong
- Country of origin: China
- No. of episodes: 20

Production
- Running time: 45 mins (per episode)

Magic Touch of Fate (魔術奇緣) is a 2005 Chinese television series created and directed by Jang Su-bong, starring Ruby Lin, Alec Su, and Kangta. Its storyline involves the world of magic and spells.

== Cast ==
- Ruby Lin (林心如) as Lin Xiao Mei (林曉梅)
  Around 23 years old. Magic cafe "Clovers"'s owner. She is the fiancée of Jin Xiu, but he leaves her because of money and honor. She later starts to love Jun An.
- Alec Su (蘇有朋) as Wu Jun An (吳俊安)
  Around 25 years old. He is from the small country city and, after coming to the big city, he started to study for test (his dream is becoming a judicial officer). By accident, he started to learn magic.
- Niu Meng Meng(牛萌萌) as Pu Yu La (朴玉拉)
- Kangta (安七炫) as Jin Xiu (金修)
  Around 25 years old. Top Magician and manager of "Clover" cafe with Xiao Mei. A very bright and ambitious person.
- Kou Zhen Hai (寇振海) as Cai Fei Hong (蔡飛鴻)

== Production ==
- Filming Duration: June 24, 2004 - estimated end of September
- Filming locations include Beijing and Qingdao
- Director: Jang Su Bong
- Producer: Nam Na Kyung
- Screenwriter: Chen Yi Xing
- Music Composer: Zhao Ji Ping

== International broadcast ==
- It aired in Vietnam on HTV7 from October 1, 2005.
