= Forgotten (2012 film) =

- Promotional poster
- Written by: Li Xiao Ping
- Directed by: Lien Yi Chi
- Starring: Ruby Lin; Christopher Lee; Chang Pen-yu; Ting Yeh-tien
- Country of origin: Taiwan
- Original language: Mandarin

Production
- Producer: Ruby Lin
- Running time: 110 minutes
- Production company: Ruby Lin Studio
- Budget: NTD 5 million

Original release
- Network: Public Television Service
- Release: June 23, 2012

Forgotten, (simplified Chinese: 遗忘; traditional Chinese: 遺忘; pinyin: Yí Wàng) is a 2012 Taiwanese television film directed by Lien Yi Chi. Starring Ruby Lin alongside Christopher Lee, it is the first television film produced by Lin. It first aired on the Public Television Service (PTS) on 26 May 2012.

== Cast ==
Cast	Role
Ruby Lin	He Wei'an
Christopher Lee	Luo Pinzhong
Chang Pen-yu	Zhao Min
Ting Yeh-tien	Pinzhong's mother
Hung Hsiao-lei	Yang Xinxin
Chang Shao-huai	Doctor

== Plot summary ==
Wei'an (Ruby Lin) and Pinzhong (Christopher Lee)'s marriage start to fall apart due to the lack of communication and personality differences. Wei'an goes to meet Pinzhong for the couple's divorce negotiation, only to find his former lover there. She storms out and gets hit in a traffic accident. Wei'an survives with some unexpected side effects: she has lost her memory, and reverted to the simple, endearing woman she was 10 years ago, reminding Pinzhong why he loved her in the first place...

== Production ==
Because of budget limitations, production started with only one-month preparation and a three-man team. Some of the scenes were shot in Lin Sun Hospital, Yang Ming Hospital, and an enclosed section of Siwei Road. The television film was produced and was aiming for the Taiwan Golden Bell Awards.

== Awards and nominations ==
Awards
Award	Category	Name	Outcome
47th Golden Bell Awards	Best actor	Christopher Lee	Nominated
47th Golden Bell Awards	Best director	Lien Yi Chi	Nominated
47th Golden Bell Awards	Best Lighting	Mei Shu Hai	Nominated
