= Half a Lifelong Romance =

1948 novel by Eileen Chang

- cover of 2014 English translation published by Penguin Classics
- Author: Eileen Chang
- Original title: 半生緣
- Translator: Karen Kingsbury
- Language: Chinese
- Set in: 20th-century Shanghai and Nanjing
- Publication date: 1948

Chinese name
- Traditional Chinese: 半生緣
- Simplified Chinese: 半生缘
Transcriptions
Standard Mandarin
- Hanyu Pinyin: Bàn Shēng Yuán
- Publication place: China

Half a Lifelong Romance (半生緣) is a Chinese novel by Eileen Chang. It was initially serialized in a Shanghai newspaper Yi Bao (亦報) in 1948, under the title Eighteen Springs (十八春). The novel was published as a book in 1950. In 1966, Chang edited the book in the United States and republished it under the title Half a Lifelong Romance in Taiwan.

The novel was under the heavy influence of John P. Marquand's work, H. M. Pulham Esq. Chang transplanted and adapted the synopsis, character settings, important scenes, and dialogues from Marquand's work.

The novel was translated into English in 2014 by Karen S. Kingsbury.

== Adaptations ==
- Eighteen Springs, a 1997 Hong Kong film
- Affair of Half a Lifetime, a 2003 Chinese TV series
- Half a Lifelong Romance (a.k.a. Eighteen Springs), a 2020 Chinese TV series
