= Paris Sonata =

- Also known as: Parisian Love Song
- Traditional Chinese: 巴黎戀歌
- Simplified Chinese: 巴黎恋歌
- Hanyu Pinyin: Bā Lí liàn Gē
- Genre: romance
- Written by: Fei Be, Wang Wei
- Directed by: Zhou Xiao Peng
- Starring: Ruby Lin: Ren Quan; Leanne Liu; Shaun Tam; Zheng Xiaoning
- Opening theme: "Ri Luo Deng Dai Ri Chu"
- Ending theme: "Tian Shi Bie Ku"
- Country of origin: China
- Original language: Mandarin
- No. of episodes: 30

Production
- Executive producers: Wang Hong, Liu Jianli
- Producers: He Xiuqiong, Chen Daolong
- Production locations: Shanghai, Paris
- Production companies: Jessie & Jones Production

Original release
- Network: Guangdong TV
- Release: 2 July 2006

Paris Sonata (Simplified Chinese: 巴黎恋歌; Traditional Chinese: 巴黎戀歌) is a 2006 Chinese television series starring Ruby Lin, Ren Quan and Leanne Liu in the lead roles, and it premiered on Guangdong Television on July 2, 2006.

== Cast ==
- Ruby Lin as Yu Manzhi
- Ren Quan as Ji Wei
- Leanne Liu as He Yutong
- Shaun Tam as Ren Yunkuan
- Zheng Xiao Ning as Yu Chongtian
- Yan Qing Yu as Wang Qian
- Liu Tao as Yu Yue
- Ding Wen Qi as Liang Qingxuan
- Ren Xiao Fei as Qiu Xiaowei
- Li Ming as Ji Kai

== Production ==
Filming started on April 18, 2005 at Shanghai's Lu Xun park, and ended July, 2005.

== Soundtrack ==
- Opening theme song: Sunset Waiting(日落等待日出) for Sunrise by Calvin Liu
- Sub Theme song: If There Is No You(若沒有你) by Kiki Ding
- Sub Theme song: Angel Don't Cry(天使別哭) by Ruby Lin
