= Amor de Tarapaca =

- Promotion poster for Amor de Tarapaca
- Also known as: 紫藤戀; The Promise
- Genre: Romance
- Starring: Ruby Lin; Han Jae-suk
- Country of origin: Taiwan
- No. of episodes: 40

Production
- Producers: Yan Da Ke; Wang Wei; Wu Jin Ying

Original release
- Network: CTS
- Release: June 2004

Amor de Tarapaca (traditional Chinese: 紫藤戀; simplified Chinese: 紫藤恋; pinyin: Zi teng lian) is a 2004 Taiwanese television series adapted from the Japanese comic Candy Candy. It stars Han Jae-suk and Ruby Lin. The story gradually unfolds from the bustling streets of Taipei to a Chilean vineyard, and finally to the beautiful mountains of Yunnan, China. It is a passionate tale of two destined lovers, threatened with dangerous obstacles of two generations of matters.

The series was broadcast on free-to-air CTS in June 2004 and on Hong Kong's ATV.

== Plot summary ==
Zhao Yanzu is a successful man suffering from a difficult relationship with his parents. Rather than working in his father's company, Ashia, Yanzu works in another company. His resentment of his parents, especially his mother, is largely because of childhood experiences. In his early teenage years, Yanzu was separated from his childhood friend, Jojo, because of his mother. Jojo lived at the Zhao household for a few years, as Jojo was the daughter of a woman Erxiang had an affair with. Yanzu maintains a cold, icy exterior, although inside he is a thoughtful person.

For years, Yanzu has gone in search of his childhood friend, Jojo. He later mistakes Xia Xiangyi as Jojo. In actuality, Xiangyi's best friend Li Yiqiao is the real Jojo. In order to let Xiangyi enter the Zhao household, Yiqiao let Xiangyi borrow her identity. Yanzu pursues Xiangyi tirelessly; however, when he reminisces on their childhood days, Xiangyi cannot find a response. Yanzu's love for Xiangyi is simply because of his love for his childhood friend, Jojo. A rivalry develops between Yanzu and his best friend, Li Jie, who likes Xiangyi. Hoping for wealth and power, Xiangyi pushes Yanzu into marrying her. Before their engagement party, Yanzu and Xiangyi go out to dinner at a restaurant where Yiqiao is a waitress. Yanzu starts noticing that he enjoys talking with Yiqiao.

When Yanzu discovers that Yiqiao is actually Jojo, he abandons Xiangyi and realizes his feelings for Yiqiao. Unfortunately, Yiqiao only looks up to Yanzu as an older brother. This is mostly because Yiqiao already has a boyfriend, Chen Lüxi, who she is very faithful to. Yiqiao is engaged to Lüxi, leaving Yanzu heartbroken. However, Lüxi later begins growing more distant from Yiqiao. The two drift apart as Lüxi concentrates more on his work as an architect. After Lüxi disappears, Yiqiao is heartbroken and seeks out Yanzu for comfort. Yiqiao starts to realize she has more in common with Yanzu.

Yanzu later learns where Lüxi is. Having suffered an accident, Lüxi is in a coma. He is supervised by one of his colleagues at work who has strong feelings for him.

== Cast ==
- Han Jae-suk as Zhao Yanzu

25 years old, Childhood name: Elvis
Son of Zhao Erxiang, an owner of a wine village and company

- Ruby Lin as Li Yiqiao

20 years old, Childhood/English name: Jojo.
An orphan & wine-master

- Melody Yin as Xia Xiangyi

21 years old
An orphan, have Yanzu as an older brother & love him, love rival with Yiqiao relating to Yanzu

- Shi Yinan as Chen Lüxi

24 years old
Yiqiao's childhood friend & grew up together, love rival with Yan Zu relating to Yiqiao

- Victor Huang as Li Jie

25 years old
Yanzu's good friend and love rival relating to Xiangyi

- Sun Xing as Zhao Erxiang
- Sunny Tu as Zheng Xin Yun
- Lin Mei Zhen as Li Mu Yin
- Shang Zhi Wei as Li Bai Kuang
- Ivy Yin
