= Star Boulevard =

Chinese TV musical series

Promotion Poster for Star Boulevard

Star Boulevard (Traditional Chinese: 星光大道; Simplified Chinese: 星光大道; pinyin: xīng guāng dà dào) is a China's first TV musical series. It is also called Walk of Fame. This 20-episode series, sponsored by Starlight International Media Co. Ltd, featured some of Hong Kong's well-known stars including Jordan Chan, Eric Tsang and Ruby Lin. The show also featured newcomers Huang Yida, Yang Ziting, Lu Jiejun and Li Xuan.

== Production ==
- Production company : Starlight International Media Co. Ltd
- Country : China
- Number of episodes : 20
- Genre : Musical, Drama, Romance
- Year Released : 2006
- Original channel : CCTV
- Directors : Andy Chin Wing-Keung, Raymond Yip Wai-Man

== Casts ==
- Jordan Chan as Wu Ku (chauvinist)
- Ruby Lin as Mi Lu (music teacher)
- Eric Tsang as Mr. Lu (Alan's father who has Alzheimer's Disease)
- Huang Yida as Alan (aka Xiao Nu)
- Yang Zi Ting as Le Man Yao
- Lu Jie Jun
- Li Xuan

== Music ==
Being a musical, the music in Star Boulevard was crucial to its success. Singaporean music producers, brothers Lee Si Song and Lee Wei Song, were asked to contribute to the soundtrack. A total of fifteen songs written by the Lees were performed in the musical.

== Introduction ==
Star Boulevard is about a group of young university music students striving for their musical dreams, and in the end their dream of performing on stage is realized in Xing Guang Xing Yuan stepping onto their own star boulevard. The story starts in the piano workshop, born from there is Le Manyao (played by Yang Ziting), who has an unimaginable perfect singing voice. During her childhood, because of a friend Xiao Nu's practical joke, she began stuttering. At this time Xiao Nu, due to a family situation, left home with his mother.
