= The Precipice Game =

- Theatrical poster
- Traditional Chinese: 魔輪
- Simplified Chinese: 魔轮
- Directed by: Zao Wang
- Written by: Doudou; Zhou He; Rebecca Wang
- Produced by: Jc Cheng; Huang Feng; Mark Gao; Ming Beaver Kwei; Gregory Ouanhon; Ryan Wong
- Starring: Ruby Lin; Peter Ho; Jin Shijia; Gai Yuexi; Wang Ji
- Cinematography: Joewi Verhoeven
- Edited by: Zhu Lin
- Music by: Greg Yu
- Production company: Fundamental Films
- Distributed by: Fundamental Films; IM Global
- Release date: 1 July 2016 (China)
- Running time: 90 minutes
- Country: China
- Language: Mandarin

The Precipice Game is a 2016 Chinese action thriller film directed by Wang Zao and starring Ruby Lin, Peter Ho, Jin Shijia, Gai Yuexi, and Wang Ji.

== Plot ==
Liu Chenchen, a free-spirited young woman, rebels against her wealthy family and elopes with her boyfriend to join a treasure hunt. But what began as an innocent game with promises of great reward soon turns into a battle for survival when the contestants are thrown into a mysterious world of intrigue and chaos in the middle of the sea. Liu relies only on her wits and her new friends to survive, all the while unmasking foes and learning that nothing is what it seems. But as her companions are attacked one by one, Liu must do everything she can to escape.

== Casts ==
- Ruby Lin as Liu Chenchen
- Peter Ho as Ye Qing
- Jin Shijia as Yu Bingchuan
- Gai Yuexi as Sun Meng
- Wang Ji as Mother
- Li Lin as Chen Hongfan
- Li Shangyi as Liu Dapeng
- Yes as Chi Bang
- Shi Zhi as Chi Bang

== Production ==
The Precipice Game was filmed in Qingdao, China. Shooting of the film wrapped up in November 2015.
