= Ancestral Temple (TV series) =

2009 Chinese historical drama television series

- Also known as: Dà cí táng
- Traditional Chinese: 大祠堂
- Simplified Chinese: 大祠堂
- Genre: Historical Drama
- Written by: Zhou Kui, Ouyang Qin Shu, Li Yi Bo
- Directed by: Yan Jian Gang; Nie Zhao
- Starring: Ruby Lin: Wang Yu; Zhao Hong Fei; Pan Hong; Gao Ming; Zhao Liang
- Opening theme: "Deng Dai" (Waiting-等待) by Ruby Lin & Wang Yu
- Country of origin: China
- Original language: Mandarin
- No. of episodes: 43

Production
- Producer: Deng Tao
- Production locations: Huangshan, Beijing
- Running time: 45 minutes (per episode)
- Production company: Central Academy of Drama Production Center

Original release
- Network: Fujian Television
- Release: 6 October 2009

Ancestral Temple (Chinese: 大祠堂; pinyin: Dà cí táng) is a 2009 Chinese historical drama directed by Yan Jian Gang and stars Ruby Lin, Wang Yu, Zhao Hong Fei, and Pan Hong. The series is aired in China on Fujian TV Station on October 6, 2009 and running for 43 episodes.

== Synopsis ==
The ancestral temple is a family's sacred place. And in the period of time where women are considered inferiors, the ancestral temple is also a place off-limits to women. In this story about this ancestral temple, it so happens that its start and development revolves around one woman, its conclusion is unknown.

== Cast and characters ==
- Ruby Lin as Zheng Xiu Yun
- Zhao Hong Fei as Xie Zhicheng
- Wang Yu as Xie Zhiqing
- Pan Hong as Da Nai Nai
- Gao Ming as San Ye (Third Master)
- Zhao Liang as Xiu Cai
- Yi Zhen as Xie Ke Chang
- Wang Mao Lei as Xie Zhixiang
- Zhao Na as Li Niang
- Qi Xiao Xiao as Xie Yufen
- Chen Chu Dong as Xie Gefei
- Liu Zhe as Zhi Liu
- Sun Han Wen as Xiao Zhixiang

== Production ==
Shooting began in August 2006 at Huangshan and ended in November. Although it was originally announced that Ancestral Temple would be broadcast in 2007, it was later postponed to October 2009.

== International broadcast ==
Channel	Location	Broadcast start date
Fujian Television	Mainland China	October 6, 2009
Xinjiang TV	Mainland China	July 30, 2012
Ningxia Television	Mainland China	March 14, 2010
ERA TV	Taiwan	March 18, 2010
Asia N Channel	South Korea	August, 2010
