= Miss Andy =

2020 film

- Film poster
- Chinese: 迷失安狄
- Directed by: Teddy Chin
- Written by: Ryan Tu
- Produced by: Ruby Lin; Melvin ANG; Chen Chi Yuan; Angelin ONG
- Starring: Lee Lee-zen; Ruby Lin; Jack Tan; Keshap Suria; Kendra Sow
- Edited by: Liao Ching Sung
- Music by: Mac Chew
- Production companies: More Entertainment Sdn. Bhd. FengCai Cultural and Creative Limited
- Release date: March 11, 2020 (Osaka)
- Running time: 108 minutes
- Countries: Taiwan; Malaysia
- Languages: Mandarin; Cantonese; Malay; Vietnamese

Miss Andy (Chinese: 迷失安狄; pinyin: Míshī Āndí) is a 2020 Taiwanese and Malaysian gender-themed film directed by Teddy Chin, and stars Lee Lee-zen, Ruby Lin, and Jack Tan. It is about a chance meeting between an illegal Vietnamese worker and a transgender woman in Malaysia. The film is Ruby Lin's first foray into film production.

The film premiered at the 15th Osaka Asian Film Festival on March 11, 2020. It was released in Taiwan on January 8, 2021.

== Synopsis ==
Meet Evon, formerly known as Andy. She is a transgender woman aged 55 years. Making the transition late in life after losing a wife, her job and family, she also becomes subject to prejudice in a society where transgender and gay people face job discrimination and run the risk of being murdered. After the losing her best friend, Evon chances upon a mother and a son escaping an abusive relationship and gets to know them.

== Cast ==
- Lee Lee-zen
- Ruby Lin
- Jack Tan
- Kyzer Tou
- Sathisvaran
- Kendra Sow

== Featured songs ==
- 沒顏色的花 (Mei Yan Se De Hua - Colorless Flower) sung by Lala Hsu

== Release ==
- 15th Osaka Asian Film Festival (OAFF) - March 11, 2020
- 19th New York Asian Film Festival (NYAFF) - August 29, 2020
- Fünf Seen Filmfestival - August 31, 2020
- Taiwan International Queer Film Festival (TIQFF) - October 11, 2020
- The Kaohsiung Film Festival (KFF) - October 31, 2020
- Hong Kong Lesbian and Gay Film Festival (HKLGFF) - November 27, 2020

== Accolades ==
Year	Award	Category	Recipients	Result	Ref.
2018	9th Golden Horse Film Project Promotion	MME Creative Award	Miss Andy	Won	

- FPP is film project matching platform included meetings and workshop, NOT screening.

== See also ==
- LGBTQ rights in Malaysia
