= Boy & Girl =

Chinese television series

- Promotional poster
- Also known as: Love in the City
- Genre: Romance; Drama
- Written by: Zhang Wei; Zhou Yong
- Directed by: Jeffrey Chiang
- Starring: Ruby Lin; Lu Yi
- Country of origin: China
- No. of episodes: 20

Production
- Producer: Stanley Tong
- Running time: 45 minutes

Original release
- Network: CCTV
- Release: April 25, 2003

Boy & Girl (Chinese: 男才女貌; pinyin: Nán Cái Nǚ Mào), also known as Love in the City, is a Chinese youth drama, premiered on China Central Television (CCTV) on April 25, 2003. It dominated over all other series with an average of 80 million audience each night. The story introduces the lives of the young generation, from real-life obstacles to seeking a lover in the modern society. The series stars Ruby Lin and Lu Yi, playing the roles of Su La and Qiu Shi, respectively. It was ranked 2nd place of the highest view rating in China during its run.

== Plot summary ==
Su La (Ruby Lin) and Yan Ru Yu (Zheng Li) (Su La's best friend), have graduated from college, Shanghai University. The two are hopelessly in love with their careers. With the face of double stress, two good friends encourage each other and swear to go explore the world out of Shanghai. As they promise, the two came to work at the same travel agency. By chance, Su La gets to meet the young successful CEO, Qiu Shi (Lu Yi). Qiu Shi is deeply attracted to Su La and starts to pursue her love. One pursue after another. However, because of her strong self-esteem and the fact that she is still recovering from the last relationship, Su La is unwilling to accept Qiu Shi. She is determined to concentrate on helping her boss, Liu Hao Dong (Yu Jin Wei), to advance the first step into Shanghai Tourism Enterprise.

In the tense society and the work competition, Su La and Yan Ru Yu is struggling to make their ways, so the two choose two different paths. Yan Ru Yu violates the work ethics, betrays the travel agency and puts the blame on Su La, who then loses her job. Because of this, their friendship is broken and they separate from each other.

However, this does not discourage Su La. Not only does she recover from the setback but she unites with her former-colleague from the travel agency. With the two of them together, they manage and own a bar for women. However, she has to go through several difficulties to get where she is. Qiu Shi, having such strong feelings for Su La. He then has forgotten about his CEO superior and is there for Su La repeatedly. The two go through bumpy roads as a couple and eventually become like family members at last. As for Yan Ru Yu, she marries her boss, Liu Hao Dong, but the result was not what she expected. After reconsidering, she chooses the correct path, and makes a fresh start in Shanghai.

This series has tried hard to unfold modern metropolis’ life with different life experience, different personality, and different experience of the youth exactly how young people's life.

== Cast ==
Names used in the Philippines are in parentheses

- Ruby Lin (林心如) as Su La / Eula
- Lu Yi (陆毅) as Qiu Shi / Eugene
- Zeng Li (曾黎) as Yan Ru Yu
- Yu Xiao Wei (于小伟) as Liu Hao Dong
- Wu Jia Ni (吴佳尼) as Chen Xiao Fang
- Jiang Hua as Jing Sa
- Feng Shaofeng as Yin Shan
- Yu Yi (于毅) as Zhao Lei
- Zhao Chang (赵畅) as Chen Ya Ji
- Zhou Hao Shi (周浩) as Lu Ke
- Zhou Lei (周蕾) as Bao Ai Hua
- Qiu Tian (邱添) – Dou Dou
- Wang Zheng Quan (王政权) as Yan Ru Hai
- Wang Lu (王璐) as A Mi
- Jiang Bing Bing (蒋冰冰) as Chen Yong Hua
- Wang Wei Hua (王伟华) as Hou Jun
- Ma Li (马莉) as Ting Ting

== Titles ==
- English Title (Asia Version): Boy & Girl
- English Title (US Version): Love in the City
- English Title (Philippine Version): Serendipity
- English Title (Internet Fan Version): Talented Guy & Pretty Girl (TGPG)
- Vietnamese Title: Trai Tài Gái Sắc
- Korean Title: 보이&걸

== Production ==
- Production: Mainland China; filming all took place in Shanghai
- Product Person: Yang Bu Ting (杨步亭), Hou Yu Qin (侯豫秦)
- Total Supervised Manufacture: Han San Ping (韩三平), Hou Yu Qin (侯豫秦)
- Supervised Manufacture: Song Zhen Shan (宋振山), Jin Zhong Jiang (Qiang) (金忠强)
- Producer: Bai Ge (白鸽), He Pan Pan (何盼盼), Stanley Tong (Tang Ji Li)
- Director: Zhang Jia Jun (蔣家駿)
- Screenwriter: Zhou Chong (Yong) (周涌)
- Year of Production: Fall of 2002
- Year Release: 2003

== International broadcasts ==
Country	TV Network	Series Premiere	Alternate title
China	CCTV	March 2003	男才女貌
Hong Kong	ATV	June 2003	Love in the City
Taiwan	ETTV	January 2004	Talented Guy & Pretty Girl
Korea	iTV	March 2004	Boy & Girl
Singapore			Love in the City
Philippines	ABS-CBN and Studio 23	August 2004 (ABS-CBN) and May 2006 (Studio 23)	Serendipity
Vietnam	Hanoi Television		Trai tài gái sắc
