= Comic King =

2001 Hong Kong film by O Sing-Pui

- Comic King movie poster
- Directed by: O Sing-Pui
- Written by: Chris Lau Ding Kin
- Produced by: Philip Kwok; Ng Yu
- Starring: Julian Cheung; Ruby Lin; Nicholas Tse; Eason Chan; Hacken Lee
- Production company: Celestial Pictures
- Release date: 19 January 2001
- Running time: 92 minutes
- Country: Hong Kong
- Language: Cantonese
- Box office: HK$4,014,014

Comic King (Chinese: 漫畫風雲; pinyin: Man Hua Feng Yun) is a 2001 Hong Kong comedy film directed by O Sing-Pui. It was shown in cinemas from 19 January 2001 to 21 February 2001.

== Synopsis ==
A romantic triangle turns fantasy into reality in this comedy from Hong Kong. Fung Yip (Julian Cheung) and Mo Wan (Eason Chan) are a pair of young cartoonists who have been hired by a comic book publisher to help write and draw a new superhero comic. Both Fung Yip and Mo Wan become seriously infatuated with Mandy (Ruby Lin), a beautiful girl who works in the office, and as the friends become rivals for her affections, their characters become increasingly contentious; in time, the superheroes they've created come to life and begin settling their differences using their fighting skills. Nicholas Tse also appears in a dual role as the two rival comic book heroes.

== Cast ==
- Julian Cheung as Yip Fung
- Ruby Lin as Mandy
- Nicholas Tse as Ting Fung
- Eason Chan as Mo Wan
- Hacken Lee as Young Lo
- Liu Wai-hung
- Spencer Lam as Newsstand vendor
- Jerry Lamb as Comic book villain
- Tats Lau Yi-Dat as Comic book hero
- Helena Law Lan as Queen of Mahjong
