= Monopoly Exposure =

Chinese television series

- Also known as: Du Jia Pi Lu
- Genre: mystery, romance, drama
- Written by: Hai Yan
- Directed by: Gao Xixi
- Starring: Ruby Lin; Zhou Yiwei; Li Yi Xiao; Huo Qing; Kou Zhen Hai; Zhu Lin; Yu Bin; Fan Yu Lin; Li Ji Chun; Li Jianyi
- Country of origin: China
- Original language: Mandarin
- No. of episodes: 30

Production
- Executive producer: Zhao Chao
- Producer: Wang Dawei
- Production location: China
- Running time: 45 minutes
- Production company: Gansu Media Group

Original release
- Network: JiangXi Television
- Release: December 25, 2014 – 2015

Monopoly Exposure
- Traditional Chinese: 獨家披露
- Simplified Chinese: 独家披露
Transcriptions
Standard Mandarin
- Hanyu Pinyin: dú jiā pī lù

Monopoly Exposure is a 2014 Chinese television series directed by Gao Xixi. It first aired in China on 25 December 2014.

== Cast ==
- Ruby Lin as Fang Dan(方舟)
- Zhou Yiwei as Zhu Wu Yi(祝五一)
- Li Yi Xiao as Shen Hongye(沈红叶)
- Huo Qing as Yuan Xiao(萧原)
- Kou Zhen Hai as Fang Shou Dao(方守道)
- Zhu Lin as Zhu Jin Yu(祝槿玉)
- Yu Bin as Han Zhen Dong(韩振东)
- Fan Yu Lin as He Guang Lei(何光磊)
- Li Ji Chun as Cao Dawei(曹大伟)
- Li Jianyi as Zhou Ziheng(周自恒)

== Production ==
Filming for the series started on 22 July 2010 and ended on 14 November 2010. Most scenes were shot in Wuxi, Jiangsu province as well as several locations in Beijing.

== Featured songs ==
- Qing Shi Huangfei (Chinese: 涟漪; Gentle Waves)
  - Composer: Liu Wei
  - Lyricist: Chen Lin
  - Performer: Sun Hao
- Qing Shi Huangfei (Chinese: 云在飘; Clouds are sailing)
  - Composer: Liu Wei
  - Lyricist: Chen Lin
  - Performer: Sun Hao
