= Heartbeat (Ruby Lin album) =

Heartbeat 心跳

Studio album by Ruby Lin
- Released: 1 October 1999
- Genre: Mandopop, Cantopop
- Label: Mei Ah Ltd

Ruby Lin chronology
Heartbeat 心跳 (1999)	Double Faced Ruby Lin (2001)

Heartbeat (Chinese: 心跳) is Taiwanese artist Ruby Lin's first album. Lin began her singing career with a five-track EP in 1999. It released in Hong Kong first amongst Asian countries. Its first single "Heartbeat" is the only Cantonese song in this album.

== Track listing ==
1. 心跳 Heartbeat (Xin Tiao)
2. 一百八十分鐘零七秒 180 Mins & 7 Secs (Yi Bai Ba Shi Fen Zhong Ling Qi Miao)
3. 笑話 Joke (Xiao Hua)
4. 生死相許 Together In Life & Death (Sheng Xi Xiang Xu)
5. 採心 Harvesting Hearts (Can Xin)

== Music video ==
1. 心跳 Heartbeat (Xin Tiao)
2. 一百八十分鐘零七秒 180 Mins & 7 Secs (Yi Bai Ba Shi Fen Zhong Ling Qi Miao)
3. 笑話 Joke (Xiao Hua)
4. 生死相許 Together In Life & Death (Sheng Xi Xiang Xu)
5. 採心 Harvesting Hearts (Can Xin)

== Awards and nominations ==
Hong Kong Radio Station Awards

- Won: Prosperous New Singer Bronze award

Hong Kong TVB Solid Gold Awards

- Won: Most Popular New Singer Award
