= Love in Sun Moon Lake =

Chinese television series

- Also known as: Ai Zai Ri Yue Tan
- 愛在日月潭
- Genre: romance, drama, modern series
- Written by: Ye Fengying, Zhang Lu
- Directed by: Li Bao Ping
- Creative director: Ding Zheng Yang
- Starring: Ruby Lin; Wen Zhang; Ke Shu Yuan; Jiang Xin; Zhao Jing
- Opening theme: Jian Chi Ai (坚持爱) performed by Wen Zhang
- Ending theme: Wang Ji Ni Bu Ru Shi Qu Ni (忘记你不如失去你) performed by Yang Pei An
- Countries of origin: China; Taiwan
- Original language: Mandarin
- No. of episodes: 34

Production
- Executive producer: Yang Cheng Shan
- Production locations: China, Taiwan
- Running time: 45 minutes per episode
- Production company: DaYe Transmedia Co.

Original release
- Network: Beijing Television: BTV
- Release: 20 July 2009

Love in Sun Moon Lake
- Traditional Chinese: 愛在日月潭
- Hanyu Pinyin: ài zài Rì Yuè Tán
Transcriptions
Standard Mandarin
- Hanyu Pinyin: ài zài Rì Yuè Tán

Love in Sun Moon Lake (Chinese:愛在日月潭), also known as Ai Zai Ri Yue Tan, is a Chinese television series about the family connections between the two shores of China and Taiwan. It stars Taiwanese actress Ruby Lin and Mainland actor Wen Zhang. It was first aired in China on Beijing Television on 20 July 2009.

== Storyline ==
Jiang Zhong He start to searching of his family roots after his great-aunt's death for 50 years of separation and lovesickness between his great-aunt and great-uncle. With his great-aunt's aborigine wooden totem necklace given by his great-uncle, Jiang Zhong He meets An-An in Taiwan, who also wears the same necklace. An-An is a passionate Taiwanese aborigine princess. She carries much on her shoulders, trying to support the local orphanage through her job and seeking corporate sponsors. An-An has a rich boyfriend, Meng Ting. He prepares for his wedding with An-An, although his mother objects strongly to their union. After getting to know Zhong He, An-An slowly falls in love with Zhong He, but in their hearts they cannot take their love a step further.

== Cast ==
- Ruby Lin as An An
- Wen Zhang as Meng Ting
- Ke Shu Yuan as Jiang Zhong He
- Jiang Xin as Jiang He
- Zhao Jing as Li Chao Xiang
- Xiao Xiao Bin as Tuo Tuo
- Ren Dong Lin as Fu Kang Lin
- Ye Qing Qing as Ai Li
- Tian Li as Liu Yi Yi
- Huang Xiao Li as Jiang Feng Shi
- Yao Dai Wei as Zhuang Man Mei
- Qin Yan as Zhan Sen

== Production ==
20 June 2008, Taiwan government information office bureau chief Shi Yaping expressed that they will deregulate the policy regarding mainland actors coming to Taiwan. The first to benefit is "Love in Sun Moon Lake," 16 of its mainland cast and crew members have obtained official work permits to come to Taiwan.

== Featured songs ==
- Jian Chi Ai (Chinese: 坚持爱) performed by Wen Zhang
- Wang Ji Ni Bu Ru Shi Qu Ni (忘记你不如失去你) performed by Yang Pei An

== Trivia ==
- Investment by China People's Daily.
- Initially, Taiwanese Actor Ming Dao was selected for the role of Meng Ting but it went to Wen Zhang eventually.
- First Chinese TV series obtained official work permits to come to Taiwan.

== See also ==
- Nationality Law of the People's Republic of China
