= New Rubyology =

New Rubyology 新如主義

Studio album by Ruby Lin
- Released: 29 November 2009
- Genre: Mandopop
- Label: Feile Music

Ruby Lin chronology
Possessing Ruby Lin (2004)	New Rubyology 新如主義 (2009)

New Rubyology (Xin Ru Zhu Yi) is an album by Ruby Lin released in November 2009. It was the first album by independent music studio Feile. Lin returned to music after a four-year break. One of the album's singles, "Beside me" (Chinese: 左右; pinyin: zuò yòu), was the theme song for China National Music Radio's "Attention for Poor Children and Students" campaign.

== Track listing ==
1. 我以为没有看到就好 If only I haven't seen
2. 洋葱浓汤 Onion Soup
3. 谜底 Answers to the riddle
4. 习惯了 Used to It
5. 左右 Beside me
6. 最好是 The best
7. Martini
8. 海洋 Oceans
9. 姊妹淘万岁
10. 一个人浪漫 One person's romance

== Awards and nominations ==
12th M-Zone Music Awards

- Won: Golden Melody Song of the Year
- Won: All-round Artist

Top Chinese Music Chart Awards

- Nominated : Best Female Artist (Taiwan)

== Trivia ==
- People related the songs on this album about lost love to Lin's breakup with former rumored boyfriend Stanley Tong; Lin said the songs are not about anyone in particular.
- The title song, "Onion Soup", ranked in the first position on Chinese Music Charts for three weeks.
