= Drama Go! Go! Go! =

2012 Chinese television series

- Promotional poster
- Also known as: Go! Sister Go! Older Woman marching forward
- Genre: Romance comedy
- Written by: Ryan Tu
- Directed by: Danny Dun
- Starring: Ruby Lin; Jiro Wang; Lin Gengxin
- Theme music composer: Chen Xinyan
- Opening theme: Our Script by Jiro Wang
- Ending theme: I Should Love You by Jiro Wang
- Country of origin: China
- Original language: Mandarin
- No. of episodes: 30

Production
- Producer: Ruby Lin
- Production locations: Taiwan, China
- Running time: 45 minutes per episode
- Production companies: 1. Ruby Lin Studio; 2. Eastern Shine Production Co., Ltd; 3. Beijing XiShiJi film and TV culture

Original release
- Network: Hunan Satellite TV
- Release: 3 November 2012 – 9 February 2013

Drama Go! Go! Go!
- Chinese: 姐姐立正向前走
- Simplified Chinese: 姐姐立正向前走
Transcriptions
Standard Mandarin
- Hanyu Pinyin: Jie Jie Li Zheng Xiang Qian Zou

Drama Go! Go! Go! (Chinese: 姐姐立正向前走; lit. Older Woman Marching Forward) is a 2012 Chinese television series produced by Ruby Lin and directed by Danny Dun. It stars Ruby Lin, Jiro Wang and Lin Gengxin in the lead roles. The 30-episode series was first aired on Hunan Satellite TV on 3 November 2012.

== Synopsis ==
As story that centers on the messy, but sweetly satisfying romantic life of 30-year-old female scriptwriter named Wang Ming Ming. During a writer's block, she developed a crush on the lead singer of the no longer popular duo HE, an idol by the name of Eason. On a whim, Ming Ming decides that Eason will be the perfect candidate for the lead role of her drama. Eason and his manager is eager to take it to increase his waning popularity, except that Eason is quite possibly a terrible actor, and pretty soon is in danger of getting written off the drama when the lead actress threatens to quit. To ensure he doesn’t get written off, he starts trying to seduce Ming Ming, hoping that by dating the screenwriter he can stay on the drama.

== Cast ==
- Ruby Lin as Wang Ming Ming
- Jiro Wang as Eason
- Lin Gengxin as Tong Shao Tian
- Maggie Wu as Shen Pei Ni
- Hu Bing as Fu Yun Kai
- Zhang Lun Shuo as Henry
- Hua Yi Han as Ru En
- Wang Yu as Hao De
- Peter Ho as Ou Yang Cheng
- Wang Li Yin as Ming Ming's mother
- Fu Yan as Lin Yan

== Casting ==
Ruby Lin said she got to pick the actors for the show and wanted to work with people she hadn't worked with before. Lin stated, "I picked Jiro Wang for the main role because he seems to have this natural comedic side to him. I've seen some of his work before and he is not really the Prince Charming type. Rather, he pretends that he is the very hunky type, so it's quite funny. He was perfect for this character."

== Soundtrack ==
- Opening theme song: Our Script (我們的劇本) by Jiro Wang
- Ending theme song: I Should Love You (我應該去愛你) by Jiro Wang
- Dearest Stranger (亲爱的路人) by Rene Liu
- Answer (解答) by Golden Zhang

== International broadcast ==
Country	Network(s)/Station(s)	Series premiere
China	Hunan Broadcasting System	November 3, 2012
Taiwan	TVBS	March 26, 2013
South Korea	Chunghwa TV	April 2013
Japan	Asia Dramatic TV	April 23, 2013
Singapore	Singtel TV	May 8, 2013
Malaysia	Astro	June 8, 2013
Vietnam	Yan TV	April 2014
Hong Kong	HKTV	July 1, 2015
Thailand	JKN	September 14, 2016 (Every Monday to Friday from 13.30 to 14.30)
Thailand	Channel 9 MCOT HD	April 3, 2018 - April 30, 2018 (Every Monday to Friday night (Tuesday morning to Saturday), 00.30-01.40 hrs.)
