= The Glamorous Imperial Concubine =

Chinese television series (2011)

- DVD cover
- Also known as: Introduction of the Princess
- Traditional Chinese: 傾世皇妃
- Simplified Chinese: 倾世皇妃
- Hanyu Pinyin: Qīng Shì Huángfēi
- Jyutping: King^{1} Sai^{3} Wong^{4}-fei^{1}
- Genre: Historical fiction Romance
- Based on: Qing Shi Huangfei by Murong Yin'er
- Written by: Zhang Yingjun; Shao Sihan
- Directed by: Lin Feng; George Leung
- Presented by: Ouyang Changlin; He Yongwei; Gao Xixi; Qi Niaoding; Danny Zhang; Michael Chi
- Starring: Ruby Lin; Kevin Yan; Wallace Huo
- Opening theme: The Glamorous Imperial Concubine by Ruby Lin
- Ending theme: Listen to Me by Ruby Lin; Glamorous Lifetime by Wallace Huo
- Country of origin: China
- Original language: Mandarin
- No. of episodes: 42

Production
- Executive producer: Lisa Tan
- Producers: Ruby Lin; Mu Xiaosui
- Production location: China
- Running time: 45 minutes per episode
- Production companies: Beijing Heyin TV & Culture Co. Ruby Lin Studio

Original release
- Network: Hunan Television
- Release: 30 September – 20 October 2011

The Glamorous Imperial Concubine (Chinese: 倾世皇妃) is a 2011 Chinese television series based on a novel of the same title by Murong Yin'er (慕容湮儿). Starring Ruby Lin with Kevin Yan and Wallace Huo, it was Lin's producing debut.

Filming for the series started on 19 January 2011 in Hengdian and wrapped up on 6 April 2011. It was first aired in China on HBS on 30 September 2011.

== Synopsis ==
Set against the backdrop of the turbulent Five Dynasties and Ten Kingdom period of 10th century Imperial China, follows the story of a kind and beautiful princess, Ma Fuya of Chu. In one night, her kingdom perished under the hands of the manipulative Ma Yi Fang, Fuya's uncle. Forced to flee her home after being betrayed and losing everything she loved, she bravely ventures on the path to restoring her kingdom with the help of the mysterious Meng Qiyou, the unfavored prince of Shu. Although he has ulterior motives and uses Fuya as a political tool, he falls in love with her and secretly protects her from danger.

As she hides in Shu, the crown prince of Northern Han, Liu Liancheng who has an unrequited love for Fuya, searches for her desperately.

The exiled princess becomes the subject of the affections of various princes and emperors, entangled in the battle of inner states affairs of Shu and Han as well as raging wars between contending states.

== Cast ==
=== Main ===
- Ruby Lin as Ma Fuya (馬馥雅) / Pan Yu (潘玉) / Mei Jing
  - Ma Fuya: The beloved princess of the kingdom of Chu who wishes to seek revenge and restore her fallen kingdom. After failing to seek refuge in Northern Han, she forms an alliance with the deposed crown prince of Shu, Meng Qiyou and shelters herself in his kingdom.
  - Pan Yu: At Shu, Meng Qiyou gives her the identity of Pan Yu, the daughter of a lowly magistrate and helps her participate in the beauty selection according to his plans. She becomes the subject of attention due to her beauty and kindness, gaining the affection of Meng Qixing and the respect of Meng Qiyun. Because of this, she also endures many hardships evoked by the spiteful empress of Shu who looks down on her low birth, as well as other selection candidates. Through it all, she and Qiyou rely on each other for support and comfort, eventually falling in love.
- Kevin Yan as Meng Qiyou (孟祈佑)
  - The eldest prince of the kingdom of Shu. A mistreated prince who was a subject of rejection by his birth mother, Empress Du, as well as his adoptive mother Consort Mei. He initially saw Fuya as an essential chess piece to his schemes for the throne but inevitably falls in love with her and secretly shelters her from harm.
- Wallace Huo as Liu Liancheng (劉連城)
  - The devoted Emperor of Northern Han. He harbours unrequited romantic affections for Fuya and searches for her in vain after her kingdom's usurpation. He ends up marrying her cousin, Ma Xiangyun and resents her for separating him from Fuya. His infatuation for Fuya brings out the worst in him as he secretly resorts to questionable means to gain her love and have her by his side.

=== Supporting ===
- Mao Zijun as Ma Duyun, Ma Fuya's younger brother. After the memory loss, he was raised by Lianxi.
- Jennifer Hong as Ma Xiangyun
- Tony Yang as Liu Lianxi
- Qui Shuang as Meng Qixing
- Liu Zijiao as Liu Liansi
- Kara Hui as Du Feihong, Empress of Shu. Qiyou's and Qixing's mother.
- Wang Lin as Han Zhaoyi, Emperor of Shu's consort
- Dai Chunrong as Dowager Dugu, mother of Liancheng and Liansi.
- Qiu Shuang as Meng Qixing, Third prince of Shu.
- Miao Haojun as Hua Ziqiao, eunuch Hua of Chu.
- Kang Qunzhi as Lin Muyi, Empress of Chu. Fuya's mother.
- Jiang Kai as Meng Zhixiang, Emperor of Shu.
- Liu Tao as Wen Jingruo, Lady Jing. She is in love with Qiyou.
- Wang Yu as Meng Qiyun, Second prince. Qiyou's half-brother whose mother is Meiying.
- Zheng Kai as Han Ming, General of Later Shu. He loves Han Zhaoyi.
- Yang Kaichun as Yunzhu, Palace maid. Fuya's best friend.
- Liu Yong as Ma Yin, Ruler of Chu. Fuya's father.
- Hao Zejia as Du Wan, niece of Empress Du. She married Qixing.
- Chen Chen as Su Yao. Fuya's friend, executed for being a spy.
- Hao Luofan as Xiaoxingan. Fuya's faithful family maid.
- Sun Xi as Mo Chou. White haired faithful servant of Empress Du.
- Bai Jie as Ping Zi
- Qiao Renliang as Zhao Kuangyin
- Zhou Yiwei as Chai Rong, prince of Zhou
- Zhang Xiaochen as Shenzhi, prince of Min
- Wu Xin
- Du Haitao

== Soundtrack ==
No.	Title	Lyrics	Music	Singer	Length
1.	"The Glamorous Imperial Concubine (倾世皇妃)" (Opening theme song)	Vincent Fang (lyricist)	Gu Liang	Ruby Lin
2.	"Listen to Me (倾听我)" (Ending theme song)	Vivian Hsu	Kenji Wu	Ruby Lin
3.	" Glamorous Lifetime (倾世)"			Wallace Huo

== Awards and nominations ==
Year	Award	Category	Recipient	Result	Ref.
2011	YOUKU Entertainment Award	Best Producer	Ruby Lin	Won	
2011	YOUKU Entertainment Award	Best Actress	Ruby Lin	Won	
2011	YOUKU Entertainment Award	Most Appealing Actor	Wallace Huo	Won	
2011	YOUKU Entertainment Award	Best Supporting Actor	Mao Zijun	Won	
2011	YOUKU Entertainment Award	Best Supporting Actress	Hong Xiaoling	Won	
2011	YOUKU Entertainment Award	Top 10 Television Series		Won	
2011	China TV Drama Awards	Best Producer	Ruby Lin	Won	

== International broadcast ==
Country	TV Network	Series Premiere	Alternate title
China	Hunan TV	30 September 2011	倾世皇妃 (Qing Shi Huangfei)
Taiwan	CTV	22 November 2011	傾世皇妃 (Qing Shi Huangfei)
Korea	Chung Hua TV	7 January 2012	경세황비 (Gyeong Se Hwang Bi)
United States	ICN TV network	7 February 2012	The Glamorous Imperial Concubine
Malaysia	ASTRO	March 2012	The Glamorous Imperial Concubine
Vietnam	Today TV	21 June 2012	Khuynh Thế Hoàng Phi
Hong Kong	TVB Paid channel	25 July 2012	傾世皇妃
Japan	LaLa TV	2 December 2013	傾城の皇妃～乱世を駆ける愛と野望～
Thailand	3 Family (a network of Channel 3)	4 June 2016	หม่าฟู่หยา จอมใจบัลลังก์เลือด, หม่าฟู่หยา หัวใจเพื่อบัลลังก์
