= Dali Princess =

Chinese television series

- Genre: Romance, historical drama
- Directed by: Pu Tengjin
- Starring: Ruby Lin; Liu Tao
- Opening theme: 爱的眼泪 (Ai De Yan Lei) by Liu Tao
- Country of origin: China
- Original language: Mandarin
- No. of episodes: 31

Production
- Executive producers: Yang Xu, Zhou Min
- Production locations: Dali, Yunnan
- Running time: 45 minutes per episode

Original release
- Network: CCTV
- Release: January 12, 2009

Dali Princess
- Chinese: 大理公主
Transcriptions
Standard Mandarin
- Hanyu Pinyin: Dàlǐ Gōngzhǔ

Dali Princess (Chinese: 大理公主; pinyin: Da Li Gong Zhu))is a Chinese television series produced by CCTV in 2006. This series completed filming on 22 January 2006. Spanning over 31 episodes, series focuses on the lead character Aiyue's love relationships.

There were plans to start airing it in June 2008, but was postponed because of copyright problems. Finally, it released in January 2009.

== Synopsis ==
On the eve of the 1911 Revolution, the Duan Muhai is making preparations for the fire festival. Duan Muhai is the owner of the Nanshan Manor and is very wealthy through looting people's wealth. Aiyue is his favorite daughter and she is bright and intelligent, empathetic towards others while being very clear on the lines of love and hate, unlike the other family members. A'ci is silly, she likes to dance with a bamboo pole and smoke box at all hours of the day and sing folk songs.

At the yearly fire festival, a handsome bright young fellow named Liu Bo'en and his friend Long Chulai arrives, and they meet with Aiyue and A'ci. Aiyue gradually falls for Bo'en, but she is too proud to reveal her feelings. A'ci takes advantage of the situation since she is passionately in love with Bo'en. Long Chulai admires Aiyue, but because of his ugly looks he keeps it to himself, and feels he can only secretly love Aiyue.

As the 1911 Revolution erupts and Muhai's family falls on hard times, Bo'en is assigned to Beijing, and Aiyue is forced to fulfill a childhood marriage contract - then sold by her heartless husband to a notorious opium lord. The ruthless Wang Kun, however, is moved by Aiyue's Sandao tea, and he finances Aiyue's tea garden.

When Muhai suddenly dies, the burden of the Duan family is put on Aiyue's shoulders; on one hand she has to develop the tea garden, on the other she has to temper internal frictions. For a while she becomes mentally and physically exhausted, and fortunately A'ci and Long Chulai come out to help. As time goes on, Aiyue develops subtle feelings for Long Chulai, who cannot tell whether it is love or friendship. The tea garden becomes a success, with Sandao tea becoming a sort of a local trademark. At the same time Bo'en returns, while Aiyue discovers that her relationship with A'ci has grown apart.

In 1915 Yuan Shikai proclaims himself the new emperor. The movement to protect the country starts in Yunnan, and Aiyue donates a massive amount of money to help the new army bring Yuan down. Long Chulai and Bo'en join the movement together, heading off to Yixing, defeat the northern army in the famous "Battle of Luna", but news about Bo'en's is killed at the front.

Aiyue and A'ci continue to manage the tea garden, both of them reconciling. Aiyue gives the tea garden to all the workers unconditionally; as time passes, people start to forget Aiyue's name, only remembering that she comes from Dali and so they call her "Dali Princess."

== Characters ==
- Duan Aiyue - Dali Nanshan Manor master's beloved daughter who is bright and intelligent, empathetic towards others, is at the same time spoiled, pampered and does not do any work. She is very clear on the lines of love and hate, and at the fire/flare festival she meets Liu Bo'en and falls in love with him.
- A'ci - Dali Nanshan Manor's servant girl. Born in Dali, in the same year, same month, same day as Aiyue. After her mother died (at the hands of Duan Muhai, Aiyue's father, explained below), A'ci came back for revenge 10 years later. She is silly, but eventually gets everyone to like her, treat her kindly, and earn the master's trust. Finally, A'ci become Ai Yue's stepmom.
- Liu Bo'en - He studied abroad in France for his military training, and wanting to serve his country, arrives at the manor to put his training into practice. He is hired by Muhai to train the citizens' army. When the revolution suddenly takes shape, Bo'en reveals his true identity. Bo'en is a member of the alliance, and he arrives at the manor for the purpose of coordinating with the revolution.
- Long Chulai - Liu Bo'en's friend who wants to challenge Bo'en to a duel, both refusing to give way. He admires Aiyue, but because of his bad looks he keeps to himself, can only secretly love Aiyue.
- Duan Muhai - Nanshan Manor owner. He is very wealthy. With the help of the Qing government he looted people's wealth, and his family lives in extravagance. Ten years before 1911 Revolution when A'ci's mother caught the plague, he was to take the lead in this situation and pushed A'ci's mother into the fire and she burned to her death.

== Cast ==
- Ruby Lin (林心如) as Duan Aiyue (段艾月)
- Liu Tao (刘涛) as A'ci (阿慈)
  - Guan Xiaotong (关晓彤) as young A'ci/A'xi
- Wang Ban (王斑) as Liu Bo'en (劉伯恩)
- Xu Seng (徐僧) as Long Chulai (龍出來)
- Fan Zhiqi (樊志起) as Duan Muhai (段沐海)
- Gao Baobao (高宝宝) as Yan Chahua (嚴茶花)
- Jin Shunzi (金顺子) as Zhao Baozhu (趙寶珠)

== Theme song ==
- 爱的眼泪 (Ai De Yan Lei) by Liu Tao
