= The Way We Were (2014 TV series) =

2014 Taiwanese television series

- Also known as: 16 Summers

Chinese name
- Traditional Chinese: 16個夏天
- Simplified Chinese: 16个夏天
- Literal meaning: 16 Summers
Transcriptions
Standard Mandarin
- Hanyu Pinyin: Shíliù Gè Xiàtiān
Southern Min
- Hokkien POJ: Cha̍p-la̍k Ê Hā-thiⁿ
- Genre: romance
- Written by: Zheng-Zhe Du
- Directed by: Fu-Hsiang Hsu
- Starring: Ruby Lin; Weber Yang; Ann Hsu; Melvin Sia; Jason Tsou
- Theme music composer: End theme by Eric Chou
- Opening theme: "Langman Lai Xi"
- Ending theme: Chinese: 以後別做朋友, romanized: Yihou Bie Zuo Pengyou, lit. 'Let's Not Be Friends Anymore' (known as "The Distance of Love" in English)
- Country of origin: Taiwan
- Original languages: Mandarin; Taiwanese
- No. of episodes: 16

Production
- Executive producer: Wang Zhuan Ren
- Producers: Ruby Lin; Lisa Tan
- Production locations: Taiwan, Shanghai
- Running time: 90 minutes (per episode)

Original release
- Network: TVBS; Public Television Service
- Release: 19 July – 1 November 2014

The Way We Were (Chinese: 16個夏天; Pe̍h-ōe-jī: Cha̍p-la̍k Ê Hā-thiⁿ), also known as 16 Summers, is a 2014 Taiwanese romance drama produced by Ruby Lin and Lisa Tan and directed by Fu-Hsiang Hsu (許富翔; Pe̍h-ōe-jī: Khó͘ Hù-siông). It stars Lin, Weber Yang, Ann Hsu, Melvin Sia and Jason Tsou (鄒承恩; Pe̍h-ōe-jī: Chau Sêng-un) as five friends who first met in college in late-1990s Taipei. In 16 episodes, the series narrates a love and friendship story that spans 16 years, from the summer of 1998 to 2014. It is set against major events that occurred in Taiwan during the 16 summers, such as the 729 blackout, 921 earthquake, SARS and the 2008 financial crisis.

According to online statistics collected by the website dailyview.tw, it was the most popular Taiwanese idol dramas in 2014. Another website 7headlines.com ranked it the second most popular Taiwanese drama of 2014, after In a Good Way (which began broadcasting in 2013 and was therefore not included in dailyview.tw's ranking). Google ranked it the second most-searched TV series in Taiwan in 2014, after the Korean drama Empress Ki.

At the 50th Golden Bell Awards, the series won three out of seven nominations, including Best Television Series, Best Director, and Best Supporting Actress for Ann Hsu.

== Synopsis ==
While in college, Jia-Ni Tang (Ruby Lin) falls in love with her schoolmate and neighbour, Wei-De Fang (Weber Yang), after she agrees with Wei-De's idea of an eye for an eye, when she catches her boyfriend cheating with another girl. However, broader events intervene in their romance: during the historic 1999 Jiji earthquake in Taiwan, Jia Ni's friend Jun-Jie Wang (Melvin Sia) becomes crippled in one leg. Out of obligation and compassion, Jia-Ni decides to marry Jun-Jie. When Jia Ni and Wei-De run into each other again in 2008, she is a married woman and he is about to walk down the aisle. They are still in love but part as friends. But when fate brings the two back together at another wedding in 2013, will they make the same decision?

== Cast ==
=== Main cast ===
- Ruby Lin as Jia-Ni Tang
- Weber Yang as Wei-De Fang
- Jason Tsou as Guo-Qing Ding
- Ann Hsu as Rui-Rui Zheng
- Melvin Sia as Jun-Jie Wang

=== Supporting cast ===
- Queenie Tai as Ge Qing
- Ke Shu Qin as Linda
- Dylan Kuo as Jiang Da-wei (cameo)
- Akio Chen as Wei-De's Father
- Lu Hsueh-Feng as Jia-Ni's Mother
- Lo Pei-An as Jia-Ni's Father
- Pang Yong Zhi as Tang Jia-Xing (Jia-Ni's brother)
- Albee Liu as Jia-Ni's sister-in-law
- Tao Chuan-Cheng as Jun-Jie's Father
- He Ai Yun as Jun-Jie's Mother
- Chen Shi-Rong as Guo-Qing's Mother
- Gao Ting Yu as Xiao Yao (Jia-Ni's co-worker)
- Yu Jin as Ah Tai (Ding Guo-Qing's brother)
- Kelly Mi as Wei-De's Mother
- Lu Ying Rong as Xiao Mei
- Hank Wu as Jian Zhong
- Liu Sai Yang as Jiang Hua
- Lai Li Hua as Chen Li
- Yang Qing as Shu Ling
- Zhang Xi En as Luo Xiao Jun
- Shan Cheng-Ju as Jin Ge
- Renzo Liu as Liang Ge
- Yao Mi as Bao Bao
- Eric Chou as pop singer
- Pauline Lan & TOLAKU as themselves (cameo)

== Soundtrack ==
The Way We Were Original Soundtrack (16個夏天 電視原聲帶) was released on September 24, 2014 by various artists under Sony Music Entertainment (Taiwan) Ltd. It contains 15 songs, in which of them are instrumental versions of some songs.

| Type | Title | Singer(s) | Lyricist | Songwriter |
|---|---|---|---|---|
| Opening Song | "Lang Man Lai Xi" (浪漫來襲; "Romantic Attack") | Elva Hsiao | Hsu Shih-Chen | Peter Mansson; Vicky Karagiorgos |
| Ending Song | "Yi Hou Bie Zuo Peng You" (以後别做朋友; "Don't Be Friends From Now On") | Eric Chou | Wu Yi-wei | Eric Chou |
| Insert Songs | "Ru Guo Bi Ci" (如果彼此; "If Each Other") | Ai Yi-liang | Jopo Chou | Justin Cho |
| Insert Songs | "Wo Bu Zhi Dao Ai Shi Shen Me" (我不知道愛是什麼; "I Don't Know What Love Is") | Ai Yi-liang | | Jin Guisheng |
| Insert Songs | "Ai Zou Diao" (愛走掉; "Gone Is Love") | Hu Xia | Ho Chi-hung | Eric Chou |
| 1990s Songs featured in the drama | "Ai Ni Deng Yu Ai Zi Ji" (愛你等於愛自己; "Loving You Is Loving Me") | Wang Leehom | Lin Xi | James Gicho; Pontus Söderqvist |
| 1990s Songs featured in the drama | "Gong Zhuan Zi Zhuan" (公轉自轉; "Revolution") | Wang Leehom | Yao Chien | Samuel Waermö |
| 1990s Songs featured in the drama | "Bubai de Lianren" (不敗的戀人; "Unbeatable Lover") | Vivian Hsu | Sugar Lee | Tao Zongci |
| 1990s Songs featured in the drama | "Ni de Dianhua" (你的電話; "Your Phone Call") | Pauline Lan; TOLAKU | Chang Kuo-hsi | |

Eric Chou appears in ep.4, ep.10, ep.14 and ep.16 as a pop singer, performing his song live.

Pauline Lan and the band TOLAKU appear in ep.5 as themselves, performing their song on stage.

== Production ==
TVBS launch of its own drama division in 2013, The Way We Were was announced to be the third drama being made by TVBS.

It began filming in Taipei, Taiwan, on 31 March 2014 and ended on 1 July 2014. It reported more than 2 million NTD were spent on 2 days of filming in Shanghai. It first aired in Taiwan on the Public Television Service and TVBS on 19 July 2014. It simultaneously aired in China via online video platform site iQIYI.

== Special appearances ==
As her production, Lin invited good friends of her as cameo role or mentioned them by characters. Dylan Kuo guest stars in the earlier episodes, as he said "(I) have to be in Ruby Lin's drama." His character mentioned Peter Ho's name in ep.1 as an in-joke; Ho is a good friend of Kuo and Lin's in real life. In ep.3, Ruby Lin's character watched celebrity Alec Su on TV. It was another in-joke since Lin had been very good friends with Su since 1997, with the media over the years frequently asking them whether they were dating. Lin's own name as well as her claim-to-fame TV series My Fair Princess (1998-1999) are also mentioned in several episodes as in-jokes.

In addition, every episode begins with a short message from a celebrity friend of Lin's on the topic of "farewell", including Kevin Tsai (ep.1), Zhang Ziyi (ep.2), Mark Chao (ep.3), Peter Ho (ep.4), Vivian Hsu (ep.5), Jerry Yan (ep.6), Huang Xiaoming (ep.7), Tony Yang (ep.8), David Tao (ep.9), Patty Hou (ep.10), Huang Bo (ep.11), Shu Qi (ep.12), Cecilia Cheung (ep.13), Richie Jen (ep.14), Rainie Yang (ep.15), and Ethan Juan (ep.16).

== DVD release ==
- December 17, 2014: The Way We Were (DVD) (Taiwan Version) (16個夏天 (DVD)(台灣版)) - Public Television Service Foundation. (TW) - DVD Region 3 - 8 Dics (Ep.1-16)

== Accolades ==
Lan Zu-wei, chairman of the 50th Golden Bell Awards jury and film critic, said “The Way We Were” is an outstanding production on the strength of its complete storyline and high artistic and commercial values. The series was praised for using character modeling, transformation of Taiwan's landscape and changes in characters' personalities to show 16 years of changes in the Taiwanese society. “The Way We Were” selected as top ten 2015 Chinese-language TV series by Yazhou Zhoukan (Asia Weekly).

List of awards and nominations
| Award | Category | Nominee | Result |
|---|---|---|---|
| The 50th Golden Bell Awards | Best Television Series | The Way We Were | Won |
| The 50th Golden Bell Awards | Best Actress | Ruby Lin | Nominated |
| The 50th Golden Bell Awards | Best Actor | Weber Yang | Nominated |
| The 50th Golden Bell Awards | Best Supporting Actress | Ann Hsu | Won |
| The 50th Golden Bell Awards | Best Supporting Actor | Melvin Sia | Nominated |
| The 50th Golden Bell Awards | Best Directing | Fu-Hsiang Hsu | Won |
| The 50th Golden Bell Awards | Best Writing | Zheng-Zhe Du | Nominated |
| The 20th Asian Television Awards | Best Actress | Ruby Lin | Nominated |
| The 8th Straits Film and Television Festival Awards | Favorite Taiwanese TV drama | | Won |

== Broadcast ==
On 12 August, Taiwan Ministry of Foreign Affairs (MOFA) said The Way We Were is to be broadcast on 13 TV channels in Honduras, Guatemala, Panama, Nicaragua, El Salvador, Paraguay and the Dominican Republic — seven of Taiwan's 22 diplomatic allies — and in Argentina, Colombia and Mexico. It was chosen by the ministry following a strict screening process and will be the second Taiwanese TV series to be aired in Latin America.

| Network | Country | Airing Date | Timeslot |
|---|---|---|---|
| PTS | Taiwan | July 19, 2014 | Saturday 9:00–10:30 pm |
| TVBS | Taiwan | July 19, 2014 | Saturday 10:00–11:30 pm |
| KTSF | United States | March 3, 2015 | Mon-Fri 9:00–10:00 pm |
| KSCI | United States | March 9, 2015 | Mon-Fri noon – 1:00 pm |
| TVB Chinese Drama | Hong Kong | April 4, 2015 | Saturday 13:00–14:55 |
| TVB J2 | Hong Kong | August 30, 2016 | Mon-Fri 19:00–20:00 |
| LS Times TV | Canada | June, 2015 | Mon-Fri 13:00–14:45 |
| Astro Shuang Xing | Malaysia | August 5, 2015 | Sun-Thurs 16:00–17:00 |
| SDTV | China | March 11, 2016 | Mon-Sun 22:00–23:40 |
| VTV3 | Vietnam | December 12, 2016 | Mon-Sun 17:00–19:00 |
| Willax | Peru | May 21, 2018 | Mon-Fri 5:00 pm |
