= Ruby Lin =

Taiwanese actress, singer and producer (born 1976)

- 林心如
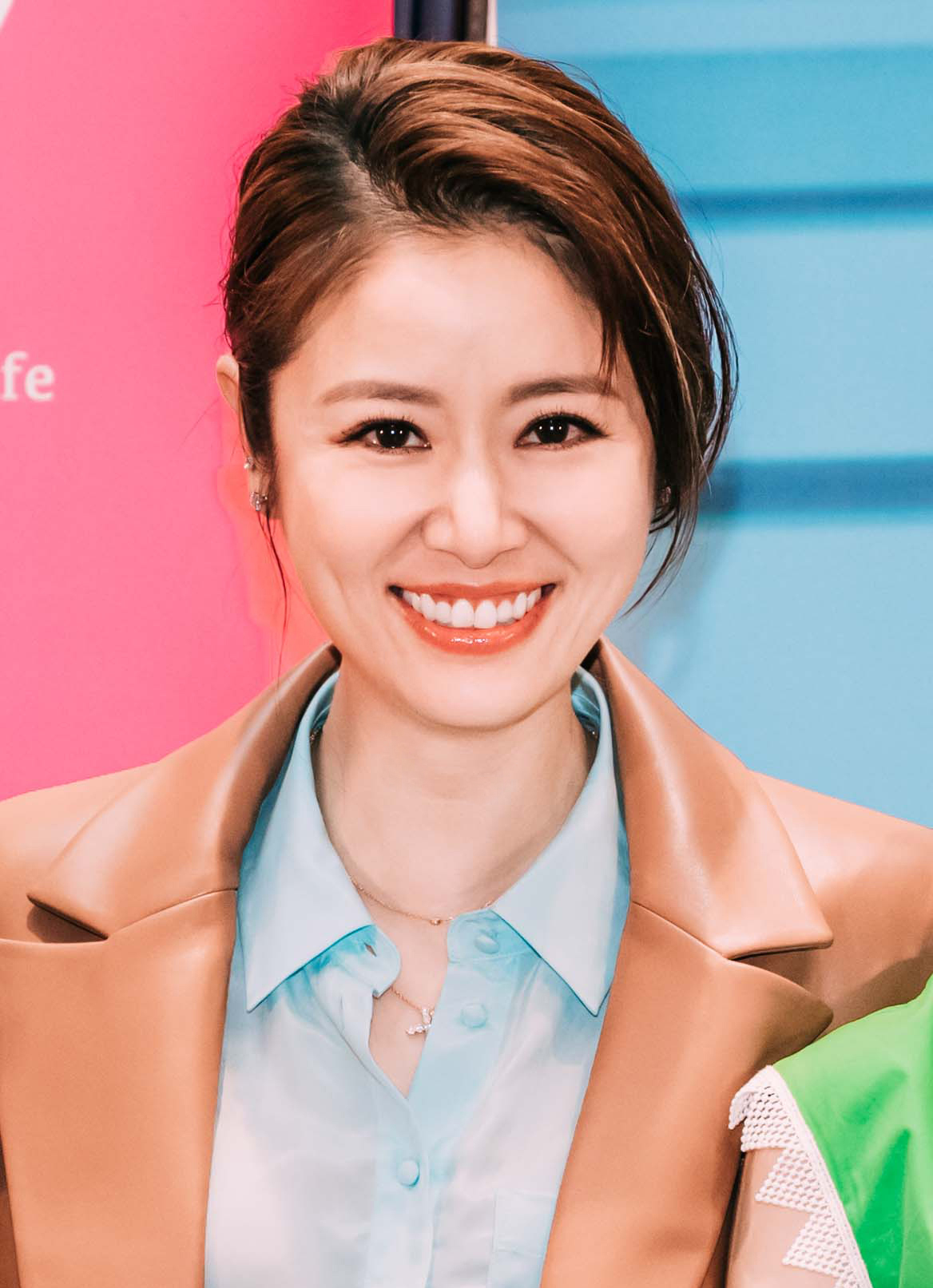
- Lin in 2021
- Born: January 27, 1976 (age 50); New Taipei City, Taiwan
- Occupations: Actress; singer; producer
- Years active: 1995–present
- Spouse: Wallace Huo (m. 2016)
- Children: 1
- Awards: Full list

Chinese name
- Chinese: 林心如
- Hanyu Pinyin: Lín Xīnrú
- Jyutping: Lam^{4} Sam^{1}-jyu^{4}

Ruby Lin Xin-ru (Chinese: 林心如; pinyin: Lín Xīnrú; born January 27, 1976) is a Taiwanese actress, television and film producer, and singer.

Lin began her career as a commercial model in 1993 and gained pan-Asian prominence for her role as Xia Ziwei in the megahit TV series My Fair Princess (1998-1999). She followed the success with TV series such as The Duke of Mount Deer (2000), Romance in the Rain (2001), Boy & Girl (2003), Affair of Half a Lifetime (2004), Beauty's Rival in Palace (2010), The Glamorous Imperial Concubine (2011) and The Way We Were (2014). While focusing mostly on TV, she also starred in films such as The House That Never Dies (2014), The Devotion of Suspect X (2017) and Miss Andy (2020). As a singer, she released six albums, beginning with Heartbeat (1999).

Since Lin started her own studio in 2009, she has been producing TV dramas and TV films starring herself, both in mainland China and Taiwan. Her production debut The Glamorous Imperial Concubine (2011) won her Best Producer at the 2012 TV Drama Awards Made in China, and her first Taiwanese drama production The Way We Were (2014) won three out of seven nominations, including Best Television Series at the 50th Golden Bell Awards.

According to Apple Daily, Lin was the third highest-earning Taiwanese drama actress in 2011, and the top-earner in 2012 and 2013. Lin ranked 30th on Forbes China Celebrity 100 list in 2013, 36th in 2014, 82nd in 2015, and 68th in 2017.

== Early life ==
Lin was born and raised in Wugu, New Taipei City, Taiwan. Her father was a businessman, and her mother a housewife. Her English name, Ruby, is from her mother's love of the jewel. As the eldest of four children in family, Lin has two younger brothers—one a year younger and the other six years younger—and a half-sister, ten years younger, from her father’s second marriage after divorcing from Lin's mother when Lin was 7. After her parents' divorce, Lin lived with her mother, who took her to visit relatives in Japan every year. She graduated from Ri Xin Primary School and Zhong Dian High School. Lin originally planned on going to the United Kingdom to study after high school graduation. However, she was discovered by a talent agent at the age of seventeen, during her second year in high school, and started working as a part-time commercial model. Her first TV commercial was for a tea brand in 1994.

Lin’s parents were initially opposed to her involvement in the entertainment industry. After appearing in several commercials, her parents eventually agreed to let her sign with an entertainment-management company. She officially joined Jessie and Jones Entertainment Ltd on her 20th birthday, shortly after graduating from high school.

== Career ==
=== Early work: 1995–1996 ===
When Lin received her first experience in front of the camera in 1995, for a minor role, she started to develop a passion for acting. After filming her first TV commercial, Lin caught the attention of TV and film directors, and many companies began seeking her for roles. She received her first role in the film School Days, with Jimmy Lin and Takeshi Kaneshiro. From 1995 to 1997 after MD completed, Lin had roles in several Taiwanese TV series and began to attract attention and buzz from the media. In 1996, Lin went to China for the first time to film; she considered this a period of valuable experience and a time that she began to learn about acting.

"I was in my second year of high school when I first got involved in film & TV industry. I thought there would be other opportunities for me to study abroad, but one does not bump into the opportunity to be in a film every day. So, I just went and had a try. I told myself that if my filming career didn't work out, then I could still go back to school. But things are not always as they may have appeared to be."

=== Breakthrough: 1997–2001 ===
After playing minor roles in various series and films, Lin was selected by Taiwanese writer Chiung Yao to audition for a main role in the comedic period drama My Fair Princess, a joint production by mainland China and Taiwan which was adapted from Chiung Yao's own novel. Originally picked for the role of Princess Saiya, Lin was ultimately chosen by the company to play Xia Ziwei instead, as the actress scheduled to play the main role was unavailable.

"After it was decided that I played the role of Ziwei, I got the script only three days before I had to leave for filming. And that was also the first time I was leaving my native place for such a long time for filming and I had to overcome the challenges of being in an unfamiliar environment. (Taiwan Cover story Interview in 2001)"

The drama quickly became a phenomenal sensation, appealing to large audiences in mainland China, Hong Kong, South Korea, and Southeast Asia. Lin rose to prominence and became a household name overnight.

After My Fair Princess, Lin starred in a number of successful television series. In 2000 she starred in Hong Kong TVB's production of The Duke of Mount Deer with Dicky Cheung, Shu Qi and other well-known artists. In this series, Lin played Princess Jian Ning – a sassy, funny girl. This role demonstrated her acting range, since it differed from the nice, sweet image she had developed from her role in My Fair Princess. The following year, she starred in Romance in the Rain, a costume drama based in the 1930s and 1940s, also written by Chiung Yao. The series was a commercial success and recorded the highest ratings of the year. For two consecutive years (2000 and 2001), Lin was included in the Top Ten Most Famous Asian Superstars. The same year, she was selected in fourth place in "Malaysia 2001 Heavenly Kings & Queens".

As Lin felt she had achieved all she could in television, she started venturing into films. In 2000, she appeared in three Hong Kong films - Winner Takes All, Comic King and the action movie China Strike Force with Aaron Kwok and Taiwanese actor-singer Leehom Wang. Although Lin had only a supporting role, she considered it a learning experience. With these films, she made inroads into the Hong Kong market.

=== Mainstream success: 2002–2005 ===
Since 2002, Lin focused on her career in mainland China. In 2003, she starred in three series - Half Life Fate (Pinyin: Ban Sheng Yuan) (adapted from Zhang Ailing's novel Eighteen Springs), Boy & Girl and Flying Daggers. Lin was chosen for the female lead in the TV version of Half Life Fate; the film version was directed by Ann Hui, a well-known Asian director. For Lin, it was a challenging role and she was under pressure.

Lin's work yielded good results; her performance enhanced her fame, earning accolades for capturing her screen character Man Zhen's 14 years of arduous life. The series was broadcast in China, Hong Kong, Taiwan and South Korea. The same year, Lin also appeared in the youth romantic TV series Boy & Girl; it was broadcast in China by CCTV, receiving the highest rating of all series aired in 2003. With this series, Lin was selected one of the Top 10 actresses of the year; of those 10 actresses, she was the only one from Taiwan. She then appeared in the ancient martial arts TV series Flying Daggers, based on Gu Long's novel. It was her first martial-arts series, and Lin played against type – portraying a cold assassin, rather than her usual gentle damsel. These three series were released in 2003 throughout Asia, contributing to Lin's rise in popularity and recognition. Though Lin focused on TV series, she continued to appear in films such as the adventure drama Life Express (with Richie Ren) and the romantic comedy Love Trilogy (with Francis Ng and Anita Yuen), which was relatively successful in China.

Lin sparked a trend towards China-Korea collaborations when she starred in the 2004 production Amor de Tarapaca (co-starring Korean actor Han Jae Suk). Lin was involved in another original Korean screenplay Magic Touch of Fate, co-starring Taiwanese actor Alec Su and Korean idol Kangta. This series is the highest-budgeted miniseries in Asian television history (as of 2011). By this time, Lin had been in show business for almost a decade, with nearly non-stop filming. She wanted to go back to school; since high school, studying abroad had been her dream. In the winter of 2004, after filming Magic Touch of Fate, Lin decided to study language and acting for three months in New York City. While she was there, Lin studied English at Study Group International and performance at the New York Film Academy.

Returning home to Taiwan with a new passion for acting in February 2005, Lin starred in Paris Sonata. For her role in Paris Sonata, she learned to play piano two months before filming. After Paris Sonata, she selected the TV drama Sound of Colors (a remake of Jimmy Liao's book) as her next work, portraying a blind radio DJ. Lin's performance as a blind girl received good reviews from audiences and the news media. This drama was broadcast in many countries, including Hong Kong, Taiwan, Philippines, Vietnam and the United States. This was followed by the dramas Star Boulevard and Da Li Princess, which were expected to be released in 2008 by CCTV.

=== Another Milestone: 2006–2009 ===
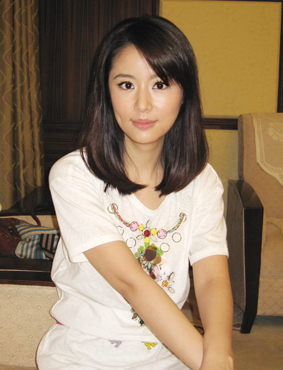
Lin in 2007

In 2006, Lin's starred in the television series Ancestral Temple where she further expanded her acting range. After three months of filming in Huang Shan, China, the series was completed at the end of October 2006. Its broadcast by CCTV-1 was planned for 2008. On June 6, 2006, Lin won the Most Popular Actress in Taiwan award at the 2nd Chinese TV Drama Award ceremony in Beijing. She has also been regularly featured in polls as one of the Top 10 contemporary Chinese actors.

At the end of 2006, Lin bid farewell to her management company Zhong Jie, after a 10-year relationship, and on November 30, 2006 ceremoniously signed with Huayi Brothers Film and Television group for a reported $10 million. Hua Yi Bros. is (as of 2011) the largest management and domestic movie-making company in China. In September 2007, she guest-starred in CCTV's historical drama Su DongPo. In this series she played the first wife of Su Dongpo (writer, poet, artist, calligrapher, pharmacologist, and statesman of the Song dynasty, one of the major poets of the time), played by Lu Yi.

After filming the digital film Evening of Roses, Lin took on more challenging roles. In late 2007, she co-starred as Daji with Ray Lui in The Legend and the Hero 2 (also known as Fengshen Bang), one of the major vernacular Chinese novels written during the Ming dynasty. After speculation over who would receive the leading role of Daji (who was known for her beauty and cruelty which ruined a dynasty), the role was offered to Lin. When Lin committed to play Daji, she could not escape comparison with Fan Bingbing, who played the same role in the first part of the series. Lin's performance received generally positive comments from media. NetandTV commented, "In comparison to the previous version, the bright spot in this new version's Daji gets a new makeover. Ruby Lin's look gave Daji a brand-new definition". Lin has often said "comparing with other people is meaningless, I just wants [sic] a breakthrough from past looks, to surpass myself."

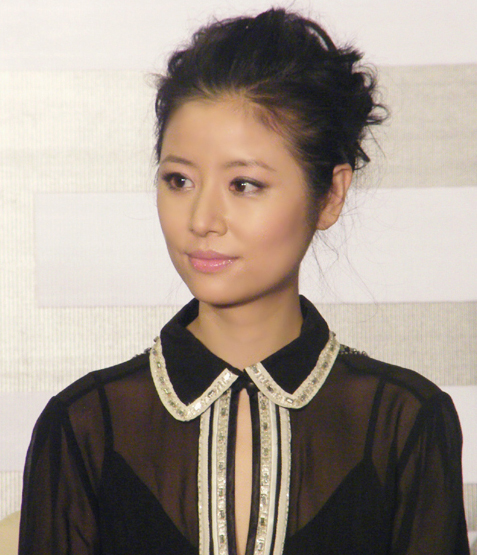
Lin in Beijing, China in 2008

In 2008, Lin returned to Taiwan for the series Love in Sun Moon Lake, playing an aboriginal woman; this was the first TV series to obtain permission for mainland Chinese actors to film in Taiwan. It was also announced that Lin had been cast as Sun Shangxiang in the new Romance of the Three Kingdoms TV adaptation directed by Gao Xixi, titled Three Kingdoms. The series was aired in May 2010, and was well-received both domestically and internationally, earning an estimated 800 million RMB (133.3 million USD) by 2012.

In early 2009, she was cast in Fallen City. In this film, Lin plays a rebellious woman during the 2008 Sichuan earthquake. In July 2009, Lin starred as Empress Dou in the Chinese big-budget historical fiction television drama Beauty's Rival in Palace. For her role in the series, Lin received a salary of 150,000 renminbi per episode. When the series premièred on a Shanghai TV station in March 2010 with the highest rating of the year, Lin got positive reviews from audiences and critics. It was reported that Beauty's Rival in Palace sold well in the Korean and Japanese markets, due to Ruby Lin's unwavering popularity in Asia. Beauty's Rival in Palace is another milestone in Lin's career.

=== Challenge: 2010–2011 ===
In May 2010, her first stage play, Sweet Sweet Love, began a Chinese tour. The play is based on the 1996 Hong Kong romantic film Comrades: Almost a Love Story, which starred Maggie Cheung and Leon Lai. During its three-month run, it was performed in four cities: Shanghai, Beijing, Hangzhou and Shenzhen. Due to popular demand, a fifth city (Nanchang) was added.

In June, Lin played a psychiatrist in the romantic film You Deserve To Be Single with Mike He and David Wu. For her performance, Lin was nominated for the 2010 Shanghai International Film Festival Press Prize as Best Actress. She also won the 2010 Vietnam DAN Movie Award for Favorite Taiwanese Actress. After that, Lin starred in Zhang Yang's film Driverless as a self-motivated businesswomen. Director Zhang Yang commented, "Ruby has a rare ability, all her emotions seem genuine". She received critical acclaim for her performance by audiences and media - "Without a doubt, Ruby Lin's wonderful range of emotions really steals the show. She delicately unveils the depths of a struggle during hard time of her life, both strong and brave yet desire to be protected."

After the success of Beauty's Rival in Palace, Lin was cast a starring role for well-known Chinese TV series by director Gao Xixi. This series Monopoly Exposure was written by Hai Yan (海岩), many of whose books have been successfully adapted for TV dramas.

2010 was a successful year for Lin. She won the Most Popular Actress award (voted online by residents of Asian countries) at the 5th Seoul International Drama Awards. According to Yahoo Korea, Lin was voted best actress with 17,358 votes followed by Fan Bingbing, Li Kun Wang and Yao Chen. Also in late 2010, Lin won the Favorite Actress of the Year award for her performance in Beauty's Rival in Palace at the annual TV Drama Awards Made in China and the QQ Annual Entertainment Star award. For her achievements in films and television series, Korean media dubbed her Taiwan's number-one actress and goddess of ancient Chinese series.

In January 2011, Lin started her first project The Glamorous Imperial Concubine as a producer. This series achieved excellent ratings and Lin won "Best producer of the year" award. She was also nominated as Best TV actress at the 2012 Huading Awards. Lin returned to the film industry again, playing a mom with two kids in the film Blood Stained Shoes, directed by Raymond Yip. The film ranked 2nd on "Top 10 box-office ranking in Chinese horror film chart". The media said that Lin's image was far removed from that which she has previously portrayed in other works.

In October 2011, Lin started on her second production, Taiwanese idol drama Drama Go! Go! Go! which co-starred Jiro Wang and Lin Gengxin. The series was released in November 2012. Lin's performance was well received by audiences and audience named Drama Go! Go! Go! as one of the most anticipated TV series of 2012.

=== Producing: 2012–2018 ===
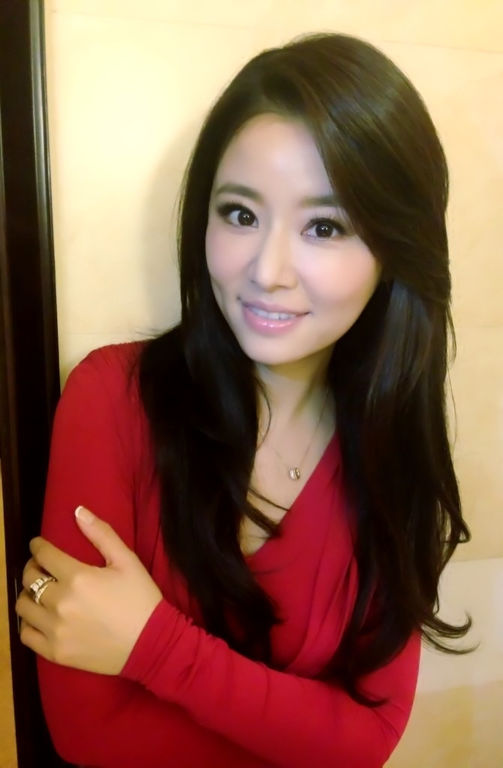
Lin in 2012

In March 2012, Lin was crowned Most Influential TV Actress at the 2012 annual Jeanwest Entertainment Awards. She also received a nomination at the Huading Awards as Best TV Actress for her performance in The Glamorous Imperial Concubine.

She then started filming for The Patriot Yue Fei, a 60-episode historical drama about the downfall of General Yue Fei in the Song dynasty. Lin portrayed the wife of General Yue Fei, played by Huang Xiaoming.

On April 27, 2012, Lin announced her third project television film Forgotten as producer and main actress. She played a married couple in the show with Christopher Lee, where their marriage started to fall apart due to a lack of communication and personality differences, and an unexpected accident changes their life entirely. It was scheduled to be first released in Taiwan on May 26, 2012. In Forgotten, critics and audiences praised Lin's performance as breakthrough. Xinhua News (Xinhua News Agency) states "Ruby Lin is recognized as one of the best promising producer. Also as actress, she is in a different class from others."

In addition, Youku Tudou Inc, the largest video-sharing website in China, bought copyright of TV series and films that were produced by Lin. Lin officially announced the news during the 18th Shanghai Television Festival.

On August 8, 2012, Lin was honored as Best Producer at the 2012 Asian Idol Awards for The Glamorous Imperial Concubine. In December 2012, Lin was announced as one of the highest paid Chinese celebrities of the year, ranking 5th. She managed to earn over 90 million RMB this year through her studio alone. She also came in 2nd on the Taiwan's top-earning drama actors list, with a yearly income of 278 million NTD.

In August 2013, Lin won Most Favorite Actress at the 8th Beijing Film Festival for Youth Welfare. Except for some public appearances, Lin spent much time doing pre-production work for the drama Singing All Along, based on Li Xin's romantic novel series Xiuli Jiangshan.

In April 2014, Lin won the Outstanding Actress award at 1st China Television Star Awards by CTAC (China Television Artists Committee Actors Committee).

In May 2014, as producer and main actress, Lin came back to Taiwan with the television film Mother Mother, playing a role of an aggressive mother. Lin stated that she will continue to film one Taiwanese series per year. The same year, Lin starred in the romance TV series The Way We Were. This drama marks Lin's return to Taiwan television after a 10-year absence. As main actress and producer, Lin received favorable comments from both critics and audiences. The series not only received high viewer ratings, but was also selected as one of the most popular Taiwanese dramas of 2014 by many of media review. Within a day of release, it reached over 24 million views on the mainland Chinese video sharing site iQiyi. Since its debut on July 19, the drama has stayed within the top two on iQiyi's most popular dramas list.

On March 1, 2015, Estée Lauder Companies announced that Lin was their new brand ambassador for Taiwan region, and Lin was also selected as spokesperson for HTC.

After finished filming Raymond Yip's film Phantom of the Theatre in Shanghai, Lin joined the cast of the licensed remake of the Korean variety show We Got Married, titled We Are In Love. In November, Lin gained her first Asian Television Awards nomination for Best Actress with her performance in The Way We Were following a first Golden Bell Awards nomination on September.

In early 2016, Lin won Huading Awards for Best Actress in a TV Series and the Woman's Media Award for Most Influential Woman of the Year. In April 2016, Lin starred in Magical Space-time, a time-travel TV series directed by Fu-Hsiang Hsu. Lin also cast in adventure film The Precipice Game, playing the role of the woman who turns into a battle for survival.

In March 2017, Lin returned to work after halting work since December to prepare for labour. She played an affectionate mother who is willing to put her life on the line to protect her daughter in mystery-thriller The Devotion of Suspect X, adapted from Japanese author Keigo Higashino's award-winning novel with the same title. The film is a reunion between Alec Su and Ruby Lin who starred in 2004 in Magic Touch of Fate, a TV series in China. In May, Lin announced her comeback in a Taiwanese drama world with romance TV series My Dear Boy, which she is also producing.

On November 15, 2018, Lin's newest project, Miss Andy, clinched the MM2 Creativity Award at the Golden Horse Film Project Promotion Awards Ceremony. The award came with a grant of USD $10,000, a welcome relief for her first venture as a movie producer. Filming is scheduled to commence in April 2019, and will take place in Malaysia. According to the media, Lin will also take on the role of a Vietnamese illegal worker for the movie.

=== Recently: 2019–present ===
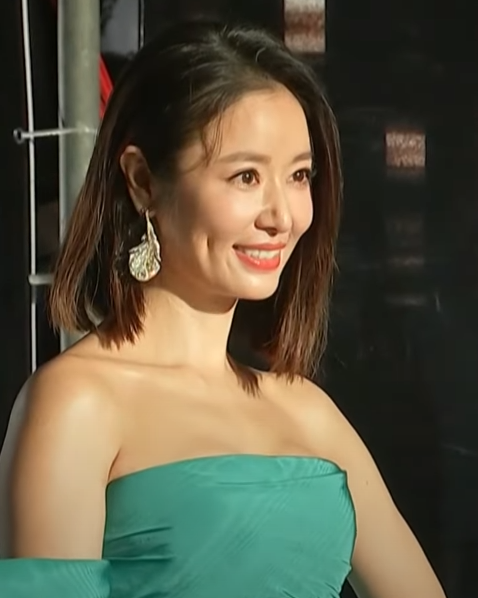
Lin at the 57th Golden Bell Awards in October 2022

In 2020, after stay in Malaysia almost 2 months for new film Miss Andy, Lin starred Taiwanese Netflix original series The Victims' Game as special guest. The series dominating Netflix's Chinese language programming list for many consecutive days, achieving a high score of 8.0/10 on China's Douban website. And also, Lin's performance received well acclaim, for such a complex and disturbing character. The reviewer for Asianfilmstrike said "The series’ace in the hole is Ruby Lin, who's only a presence in the final episodes, and in a role we dare not reveal: she sheds her smooth and pretty image completely, in an impressively somber and chilling turn."

In 2020, Lin starred in the modern drama The Arc of Life as the female lead and producer. According to the Appledaily, Lin ranked 5th on The Highest-Paid Taiwanese Actor Of 2020 list despite turning down multiple job offers in China.

In 2021, Netflix acquired the rights to Light the Night, a three-part series set in 1988 Taipei Red Light District. Lin was one of the producers and female leads in this series.

=== Ruby Lin Studio ===
In 2009, Lin establishing her own production company, Ruby Lin Studio (林心如工作室). Taiwan media reports that the company will deal with all aspects of the actress's career, including acting, singing and film roles. Till 2016, 2 artists - Miku Chang & Yang Zhiwen - and 1 director Fu-Hsiang Hsu are under Ruby Lin Studio. As a producer, she can have a lot more control over the entire TV project - overseeing the scripting process, hiring and casting. Lin stated, "I just kept getting offered the same type of role. Being an actress, you cannot really do much. Actresses can only wait for the roles to come."" "Now I can choose everything myself, whether it's the roles or the director that I want to work with or the cast that I want to feature. I feel much more in control over what I get to do."

Lin's production debut turned out to be a hit with viewers, winning several awards including "TV series of The year" from Shanghai's Dragon TV Awards, "Best producer" from China TV Drama Awards as well as "Best Producer" and "Best Actress" awards for Lin at the 2011 Youku Awards. Despite the accolades from sitting in the producer's chair, she insists that acting will still be her "top priority".

I will be producing more and more but I still love acting so much, so that will still be my main focus. There is something wonderful about getting yourself in the head of the characters that you play and being able to perform for viewers. It's just that now I also get to create characters that I really want to play."

In July 2021, Lin's studio, which was based in Hengdian, China, had cancelled its business registration license in the mainland. Since 2020, she has been based in Taiwan and moved all operations back to Taiwan.

== Personal life ==
Lin dated Taiwanese actor Jimmy Lin, whom she met when filming School Days, from 1995 to 1997. In 2006, they appeared together on the Taiwanese talkshow Kangsi Coming, asserting that distance was the reason for their breakup.

On May 20, 2016, Lin confirmed her relationship with Taiwanese actor Wallace Huo. After their collaboration in Sound of Colors in 2005, two stayed friends for more than 10 years. They reportedly became romantically involved around Lin's birthday in January 2016. Lin married Huo on 31 July 2016 at the Bulgari Hotel in Bali. Celebrities who attended the wedding included Zhao Wei, Fan Bingbing, Zhou Xun, Shu Qi, Liu Tao, Liu Shishi, Nicky Wu and Hu Ge. The pair also held another wedding reception in Taipei on 2 August 2016. Their daughter, Amelia, was born in Taipei in January 2017.

In 2019, Lin enrolled in the Shanghai MBA program of the Department of Communication Management at Shih Hsin University. Due to the pandemic, she transferred to the Taipei campus in 2020 and graduated in June 2021. Lin was the recipient of her cohort's Outstanding Achievement Award and was unanimously voted as the winner by her professors at Shih Hsin University.

== Media ==
=== Philanthropy ===
Lin is involved with charity activities for various causes.

- In 1999, Lin supported the fundraising events for 1999 Jiji earthquake.
- In 2003, become sponsor of Vietnamese boy through World Vision.
- Since 2005 Lin has been spokesperson for fashion company Xuezhu, and she established a fund to help poor people living in small cities in China. she also participated in the Jackie Chan and Friends concert in 2005.
- In 2007, Lin received the Outstanding Contribution to Charity Award at the China Fashion Awards (CFA). She also filming short film for charity TV-program 'Dreams Come True' with a blind girl.
- Following the 2008 Sichuan earthquake, Lin donated 100,000 yuan. She also recorded the unit song "We have love"(我们有爱) for 2008 Sichuan earthquake.
- In 2008, Lin funded a school for rural children, presenting a ¥200,000 (US$27,627) check to the Chinese Red Cross Foundation to build an elementary school. The Red Cross Society of China gave Lin a commemorative plaque in return, inviting her to be philanthropic ambassador for its elementary-school building project (which helps Chinese children in rural areas obtain an education).
- Lin received China Charity Star Award the for her contributions to charity in 2008.
- In 2009, Lin become ambassador for the China Foundation for Poverty Alleviation, Yum! Brands Inc. China Division and United Nations World Food Programme (WFP)'s "Donate $1, Offer Compassion, Deliver Nutrition" joint campaign. This campaign provides daily nutrition to children for at least one year. As ambassador Lin appeared at a KFC restaurant in Beijing to interact with patrons, summon more people to participate in the fundraiser and care about children's health and development. Also in 2009, Lin was appointed as a sponsor of 'Ruby Lin benevolence primary school' for rural children.
- In 2011, For Lin's contribution to charity work, China Charity Billboard Award awarded her "Charity star of the year" award.
- In 2012, Lin was appointed as a spokesperson and ambassador for the Maria Society Welfare Foundation. In order to raise money for the children, she promote the campaign at her official microblog at Sina Weibo, where she owns one of the most popular accounts. Following the 2013 Sichuan Lushan earthquake, Lin donated to the One Foundation.
- In 2015, Lin shoots for The Da Ren Wu (Big Shot) Photo Charity Exhibition. She also supported the 'Run for the Kids' charity auction with Yahoo Taiwan.
- In 2017, Lin donates the first "China and the World: For Children and Mothers" gala night was held on Nov 29 at Bvlgari Hotel Beijing. The event was organized by the United Nations Every Woman Every Child China Partnership Network and the China Friendship Foundation for Peace and Development, and supported by the Chinese People's Association for Friendship with Foreign Countries and Save the Children.
- In 2018, Lin flew to Zambia on behalf of World Vision's Sponsor-A-Child programme to meet with her sponsored child, Elidah. Aside from Elidah, Ruby is presently funding two other children from Cambodia and Honduras. And it reported prior to her latest sponsorship, Ruby had funded the education of several other children including those from Congo and Vietnam.
- For years, Lin support Linfen red ribbon school (a facility providing education to children who are living with HIV) both materially and spiritually. On 2 January 2019, Official weibo of Linfen red ribbon school released the student's thank you letter for Lin.

=== Endorsements ===
After rising to prominence, Ruby Lin became actively involved in commercial work. In 2001, she was selected as Taiwan's most popular advertisement star. At that time, she was spokesperson for Coca-Cola and Esprit. After she was selected as spokesperson for brands such as Mentholatum and Pantene, Lin was ranked second on the China Top Ten Most Popular Commercial Model list in 2005. Lin has been praised by the media for her sense of style; in 2006, MTV China selected her as most stylish actress of the year. That same year, Lin also received the Most Stylish Actress in China award at the QQ 2006 China Entertainment Star Awards.

In 2009, Estee Lauder chose her as "My Cover Girl in 2009" for their Chinese and Taiwan markets for ¥1 million, according to media reports. In 2015, Estee Lauder announced again that Lin was their new brand spokesperson for Taiwan region. In 2010, based on the popularity of her new series and film, Lin was spokesperson for more than 20 brands (including Japanese and Korean brands). Media named her as "commercial queen". Lin also won the Most Charming Actress of the Year award at the 2010 China Fashion Weekly Awards.

In Asia as elsewhere, endorsement contracts for well-known brands are evidence of stardom. Ruby Lin has been a spokesperson for such brands as Mentholatum (2000–2003), Coca-Cola (2000), Christian Dior watches (2006–2007), ESPRIT (2001), Liuhengsei casual wear (since 2001), VOV Cosmetics (since 2006), China Mobile (since 2007), Pantene (2003–2006), Sofie Pantiliners (2002–2005), D&D jewelry (2001–2005), Japanese company Glico, Oriks (since 2011), and HTC (2015), ReFa CARAT (since 2017) and Shiseido Elixir (since 2017). Lin also served as ACAP Wild Aid's Rhino Ambassador for 2004–2005 and Winnie the Pooh Friendship Ambassador in 2001. Lin's endorsements provided the majority of her income in 2007. In December 2009, Ruby Lin was chosen Best Artist for Advertisements at the annual China International Commercial and Art Awards. After Lin gave birth to her first child in early 2017, she became the new ambassador of brand for children and infants such as Fisher-Price and Pro-Kido Milk by Yili. In 2019, Nuna signs Lin as first Asian brand ambassador. In December 2020, Lin became the new spokesperson of Estee Lauder's Re-Nutriv Ultimate Diamond Collection for Taiwan region.

=== Jury ===
- 2019: Member of jury for Best Television Series at 54th Golden Bell Awards
- 2021: Member of jury of preliminary stage at Taipei Film Festival
- 2022: Executive jury at International Golden Short Film Awards

== Discography ==
=== Albums ===
- 1999: Heartbeat (心跳)
- 2001: Double Faced Ruby Lin (雙面林心如)
- 2001: Pala Pala (趴啦趴啦)
- 2004: Eighteen Springs New and Best collection (半生缘新歌和精选)
- 2004: Possessing Ruby Lin (拥有林心如)
- 2008: New Rubyology (新如主义)

=== Soundtracks ===
- 1999: My Fair Princess Original Soundtrack (还珠格格音乐全记录)
- 2004: Amor de Tarapaca Original Soundtrack (紫藤戀電視劇原)

== Publications ==
Year	Title	Release date	Notes
1999	Spring Emotion / 春情	August 1999	photo album
1999	Sharing / 心如心語	December 1999	photo album
2000	Love in Great Britain / 英倫情人	October 2000	photo album
2005	My Private New York / 私藏心如	April 2005	Travel diary

== Ambassadorships ==
- 2023 Ambassador of The Genesis Social Welfare Foundation (G.S.W.F)
- 2020 Charity Ambassador of the TVBS Foundation 'Infinite Love' fundraising campaign
- 2020 Charity Ambassador of Shiatzy Chen's charity activity
- 2018 Ambassador of China Foundation for Poverty Alleviation 'Donate One Yuan Campaign'
- 2018 Ambassador of World Vision Taiwan's Sponsor-A-Child programme
- 2017 Ambassador of Child Welfare League Foundation
- 2017 Save the Children Goodwill Ambassador
- 2016 Ambassador of Tourism in Hawaii
- 2016 Qiong Yao Culture Foundation
- 2014 Estee Lauder Breast Cancer Awareness Campaign
- 2012 Ambassador for the Maria Society Welfare Foundation in Taiwan
- 2011 Trend Health - Find most beautiful& healthy body of china
- 2010 Raily Good and Healthy Life campaign
- 2010 Sohu "EasyGo China" charity campaign
- 2008 China Music Radio Kappa Project
- 2009 World Food Programme(WFP)'s "Donate $1, Offer Compassion, Deliver Nutrition"
- 2009 Estee Lauder Breast Cancer Awareness Campaign
- 2009 Ambassador of Tourism in Seoul, Korea
- 2008 China Red Cross elementary-school building project
- 2007 Beijing Olympics public-service promotional campaign
- 2007 Anti-Depression Ambassadors of China for its campaign, including a concert
- 2005 Promoter of Annapurna Conservation Area Project
- 2004 Chinese Culture Festival in Seoul, Korea
- 2001 Promoter of Hong Kong Community Chest Walkathon
- 1999 Ambassador of Hong Kong Anti-Drug and -Crime Campaign
