= Affair of Half a Lifetime =

2003 Taiwanese drama-romance TV series

- Written by: Eileen Chang
- Directed by: Hu Xue Yang
- Starring: Ruby Lin; Patrick Tam Yiu Man
- Country of origin: Taiwan
- Original language: Mandarin
- No. of episodes: 35

Original release
- Release: 2003

Affair of Half a Lifetime (simplified Chinese: 半生缘; traditional Chinese: 半生緣; pinyin: Bànshēng Yuán) is a 2003 Taiwanese drama-romance TV series based on the 1948 novel of the same name by Chinese author Eileen Chang. It stars Ruby Lin, Patrick Tam, Jiang Qinqin, and Li Liqun. The series had the most simultaneous broadcasts on Chinese cable/satellite TVs in 2004. It was filmed in Shanghai and Taiwan.

== Plot ==
Affair of Half a Lifetime is set in Shanghai, China, during the 1930s and 1940s. It centers around two sisters from a financially struggling family, Gu Manzhen (Ruby Lin) and her older sister, Gu Manlu (Jiang Qinqin). A college graduate, Manzhen finds true love with one of her colleagues, Shen Shijun (Patrick Tam). Meanwhile, Manlu, the oldest of four children, supports the entire family. At the age of seventeen, Manlu sacrifices her pride and reputation to become a nightclub hostess. The job helps support Manlu's family, but others find her work disgraceful and look down on Manlu. Even her own grandmother does not approve of her job. Originally, before she takes up her work as a nightclub hostess, Manlu was to marry a respected doctor named Zhang Yujing. However, they are forced to part and Manlu eventually marries a comprador (Zhu Hongcai) instead.

Manlu realizes that she is barren, and fearful for her marriage arranges her sister to be raped by her husband after finding out that Zhu is attracted to her sister. Manlu also lies to Shijun, saying Manzhen has rejected his love because of the disparity between their statuses, thus forcing them to be apart. Manzhen eventually escapes from her abusive family after she gives birth to her son with Zhu, but afraid to contact Shijun for fear of the consequences if he finds out, marries his maternal cousin Shi Cuizhi. Having failed to maintain her chastity for Shijun, Manzhen hopes for the best of his marriage with Shi, and settles somewhere as a recluse and becomes a schoolteacher.

Eventually, both Manlu and Zhu feel remorse of their misdeeds toward Manzhen, and Manlu begs her sister to come back to raise her nephew/stepson with her husband after they locate her, asking for forgiveness before she dies. Despite still hating them for the rape, Manzhen stays with Zhu for the sake of their son. By chance, Manzhen and Shijun reunite in Shanghai, and both talk of each other's lives years after their separation. Knowing that they still love each other, but due to the restrictions of their respective obligations, both Manzhen and Shijun realize that they cannot be together.

== Cast ==
- Ruby Lin as Gu Manzhen (顧曼楨)
- Patrick Tam as Shen Shijun (沈世鈞)
- Jiang Qinqin as Gu Manlu (顧曼璐)
- Li Li-chun as Zhu Hongcai (祝鴻才)
- Hu Ke as Shi Cuizhi (石翠芝)
- Chang Chang as Xu Shuhui (許叔惠)
- Xing Minshan as Zhang Yujin (張豫瑾)

== Soundtrack ==
- Album Title : 半生缘新歌+精选 (Ban Sheng Yuan New + Best Selection)

The original soundtrack was released in April 2004 in China. This soundtrack contains 18 tracks, produced by BMG Ltd (Taiwan). All songs are sung by lead actress Ruby lin. Tracks 1–5 are composed for this series, other songs are from Ruby Lin's album Best Selection.

| # | Track title | Running time | More information |
|---|---|---|---|
| 1 | 半生缘 (Ban Sheng Yuan); Eighteen Springs | 3:44 | Sung by Ruby Lin (林心如); Opening song of the TV series |
| 2 | 擦肩而过 (Ca Shen Er Guo); Passed Each Other By | 3:51 | This was the ending theme song of the TV series |
| 3 | 過去 (Guo Qu); The Past | 4:10 | |
| 4 | 想這你 (Xiang Zhe Ni); Thinking of You | 3:29 | |
| 5 | 愛再靠近一點 (Ai Zai Kao Jin Yi Dian); Let Love Move Us Closer | 5:00 | Duet song by Ruby Lin & Kenneth Tong |

== Awards ==
| Year | Event | Category | Recipient(s) | Result |
|---|---|---|---|---|
| 2004 | China East Wind Music Award | Best Theme Song for a Movie or Television | Ruby Lin | Won |

== International broadcast ==
- It aired in Vietnam from October 28, 2005, on HTV7 under the title Bán sinh duyên.

== See also ==
- Eighteen Springs - a 1997 film based on the same novel, directed by Ann Hui
