= Mother Mother (2014 film) =

- Promotional poster
- Written by: Kefeiyin
- Directed by: Lin Guan Hui
- Starring: Ruby Lin; Kao Ying-Hsuan; Queenie Tai; Edison Huang; Huang Ya Zhen(Ni Ni)
- Country of origin: Taiwan
- Original language: Mandarin

Production
- Producer: Ruby Lin
- Running time: 120 minutes
- Production company: Ruby Lin Studio

Original release
- Network: Public Television Service
- Release: May 31, 2014

Mother Mother (Chinese: 我的媽媽; pinyin: Wǒ De Māma) is a 2014 Taiwanese television film. Starring Ruby Lin alongside Kao Ying Hsuan, it is the 2nd television film produced by Lin. It first aired on Public Television Service (PTS) on 31 May 2014.

== Plot ==
Yu Rou (Ruby Lin), a struggling mother who takes extreme measures in ensuring her daughter Xiao Hong (Ni Ni), who is diagnosed with Bardet–Biedl syndrome, has good health. While working as a part-time taxi driver, Yu Rou eavesdrops on a conversation about the easy life of a rich man's mistress and decides to seduce the rich-but-impotent Jin Xiao Jie (Edison Huang).

== Cast ==
- Ruby Lin as Xia Yu Rou
- Kao Ying-Hsuan as Zhuang Kai Xiang
- Queenie Tai as Zhu Pin Tang
- Edison Huang as Jin Xiao Jie
- Ni Ni as Xiao Hong
- Stephanie Chang as Jin Dong's Wife

== Production ==
- Mother Mother received a NT$2,000,000 subvention from the Bureau of Audiovisual and Music Industry Development of Taiwan.
- Production on the film started from February 19 and ended on March 5, 2014.
- This Television film is produced and aiming for the upcoming Taiwan Golden Bell Awards.
