= Love Trilogy =

2004 Hong Kong-Chinese film by Derek Chiu

- China version official poster
- Directed by: Derek Chiu
- Written by: Aubrey Lam
- Produced by: Raymond Wong; Peter Chan
- Starring: Francis Ng; Anita Yuen; Ruby Lin; Michael Chow
- Distributed by: Mandarin Films; China Film Group
- Release dates: 5 February 2004 (Hong Kong); 5 February 2004 (China); 20 May 2008 (South Korea)
- Running time: 105 minutes
- Countries: Hong Kong; China
- Languages: Cantonese; Mandarin; Korean

Love Trilogy (Chinese: 30分鐘戀要; pinyin: 30 Fen Zhong Lian Yao) is a 2004 film starring Francis Ng, Anita Yuen, Ruby Lin, Michael Chow, Lu Yi and Han Xiao. A Hong Kong-Chinese co-production, it was directed by Derek Chiu. The title used in Hong Kong is Love Trilogy, while title used in China is Falling in Love with Heaven & Earth (我爱天上人间 / Wo Ai Tian Shan Ren Jian)

== Plot ==
Three couples in love arrive in Yunnan to tour Shibo Yuan and meet the tour guide Liu Hai. The tour guide forms her own opinions of the couples and, over the course of giving a tour of Shibo Yuan, acts as an intermediary many times and helps them settle their disputes but also stirs up trouble.

=== The red couple ===
The first couple arriving for the tour are Mark and his wife Chui from Hong Kong. The childhood friends have been married for seven years and want to travel the road together for the latter half of their lives. Due to the market crash the year before, both are busy all day and their feelings for each other are starting to diminish.

=== The white couple ===
The second couple arriving for the tour are from Shanghai. Xu Jing and Bai Sheng just got married and are on their honeymoon. Bai Sheng is a workaholic, unknowingly neglecting Xu Jing. Xu Jing gave herself a pregnancy test at the clinic where she works and found out that she is expecting, causing her worry because Bai Sheng doesn't want to become a father yet.

=== The blue couple ===
The third couple traveling are from South Korea. Jino and his girlfriend BoBo are a young couple who have been dating for only about six months. Jino is romantic while BoBo is vain but in tune with reality.

== Cast ==
- Francis Ng – Mark Lao (about 30 years old)
- Anita Yuen – Chui (28 years old)
- Ruby Lin – Liu Hai (20 years old)
- Lu Yi – Bai Sheng (26 years old)
- Michael Chow – Li Caishun
- Han Xiao – Xu Jing (23 years old)
- Ji-ho Oh – Jino (20 years old)
- Yin Yi Li – BoBo (23 years old)

== Production ==
The film is set and was filmed in Yunnan's Shangrila.

Director Derek Chiu explained that the film's three love stories divide into the sections "White, Blue, Red".
