= Gao Xixi =

Chinese television director and producer

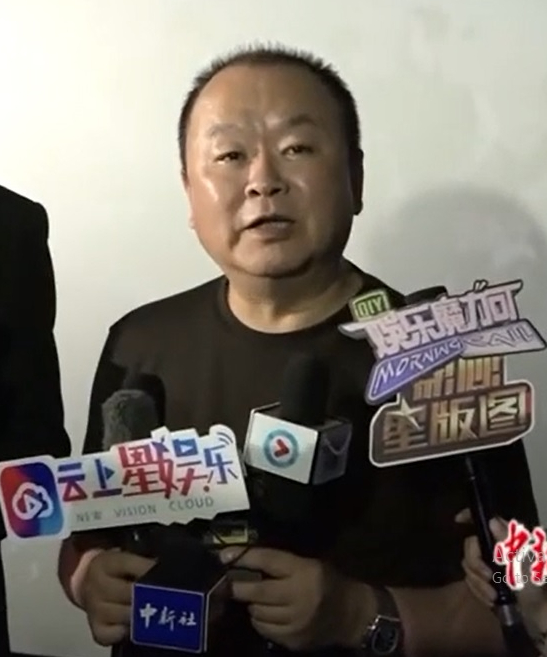
- Gao in 2019
- Born: Gao Xixi (高西西); June 16, 1962 (age 64); Nanchang, Jiangxi, China
- Education: China Academy of Art; Beijing Film Academy
- Occupation: Director
- Years active: 1994 - present

Gao Xixi (Chinese: 高希希; born June 16, 1962) is a Chinese television director and producer, famous for directing a number of commercially successful Chinese television series.

== Selected filmography ==
=== As director ===
Gao Xixi has directed over 50 films and TV series, most of which have no English title. These include:

- Bing Ge (2001)
- A Decade of Marriage (2003)
- The Sky of History (2003)
- Happiness as Flowers (2005)
- Shanghai Bund (2007)
- Three Kingdoms (2010)
- King's War (2012)
- Mao Zedong (2013)
- Monopoly Exposure (2014)
- For Love or Money (2014)
- The Great Emperor in Song Dynasty (2015)
- The Game Changer (2017)
- The Imperial Age (2018)
- Decisive Victory (2021)

=== As executive producer ===
- The Glamorous Imperial Concubine (2011)
- Seven Friends (2014)
- The Legend of Dugu (2018)
