= Rural transport problem =

Difficulties in providing transport links

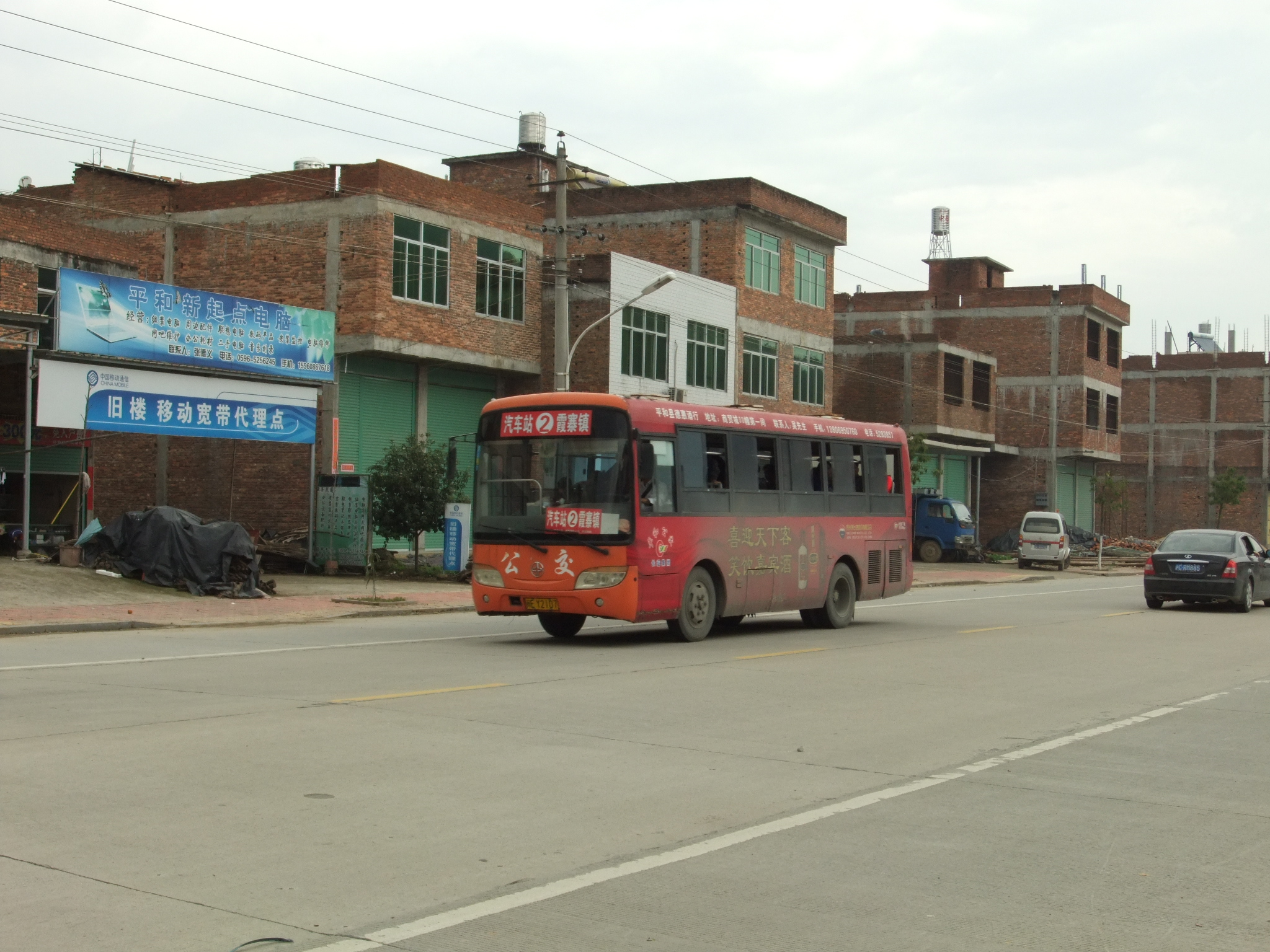
Pinghe County local bus no. 2 on its hourly trip from Xiaoxi Town to Xiazhai Town, via numerous intermediate villages. Fujian Province, China

The rural transport problem refers to difficulties experienced in providing transport links to rural communities. Low rural population density makes viable public transport difficult, though people in rural areas usually have a greater need for transport than urban dwellers. High levels of car ownership can diminish the problem, but certain rural groups (the young, old or poor) always require public transport. Increasing car ownership may put pressure on existing rural public transport, prompting a diminished service, which in turn encourages even higher car ownership, creating a vicious circle of public transport decline.

Transport plays a key role in responding to the problem of rural social exclusion. The often large distances between services and population centres in rural areas mean it is difficult for people without access to private transport. In particular, in rural areas around the world, an increasing number of ageing car drivers are having to make the transition to non-drivers. Alternative transport will play a key role in keeping these people engaged in mainstream society.

== Use of partnerships ==
Around the world, collaborative structures such as partnerships are often used to govern rural transport and accessibility issues. Partnerships in transport are useful because:

- Local transport and accessibility issues are complex, intersecting with many sectors, levels of government and policy areas;
- Low population densities and resource constraints in rural areas make innovation and flexibility in local transport a necessity;
- All rural areas are different, and strategies need to take into account local problems and opportunities;
- Effective delivery of projects often depends on the expertise or capacity of multiple actors, from multiple sectors; and
- Due to their local legitimacy, they are well-placed to influence policy.
