= Xiaoxi =

Xiaoxi (小溪; lit. brook) may refer to:

- Towns named Xiaoxi (小溪镇)
  - Xiaoxi, Wuhe County, in Wuhe County, Anhui
  - Xiaoxi, Pinghe County, Fujian
- Xiaoxi Township (小溪乡)
  - Xiaoxi Township, Yongshun County, in Yongshun County, Hunan
  - Xiaoxi Township, Yudu County, in Yudu County, Jiangxi
