= Milton H. Biow =

American advertising executive (1892–1976)

- Born: Milton Harry Biow; July 24, 1892; New York City, U.S
- Died: February 1, 1976 (aged 83); New York City, U.S.
- Other names: Milton Biow
- Occupation: Advertising executive
- Spouse: Sophie Taub
- Children: 2, including Patricia Broderick
- Parents: Harry Louis Biow; Lena Deckinger
- Relatives: Adet Lin (daughter-in-law); James Broderick (son-in-law); Matthew Broderick (grandson)

Milton Harry Biow (July 24, 1892 – February 1, 1976) was an American advertising executive who founded the Biow Company. Biow is recognized as one of the pioneers of the modern school of advertising.

== Biography ==
In 1917, Biow started a one-man advertising office in New York City. It quickly grew to become the largest advertising agency in the United States owned by one man, topping $50 million in revenues at its highest winning major accounts such as Anacin, Pepsi-Cola, Eversharp, Ruppert beer, Schenley whisky and Lady Esther cosmetics.

Biow's agency was credited as the first to develop a national advertising campaign that used short and catchy advertising slogans on radio and television (such as "Bulova Watch Time" and Johnny's "Call for Philip Morris"). He was also responsible for bringing The Lucy–Desi Comedy Hour to television and the Take It or Leave It to the radio (which later became The $64,000 Question). In 1934, he purchased WBBR with Arde Bulova and changed the call letters to WNEW, for "the NEWest thing in radio". In 1956, he disbanded his agency after the loss of several major accounts. His firm was the starting point for advertising executive Norman B. Norman.

In 1964, Biow wrote Butting In: An Adman Speaks Out which told the story of his time in advertising.

== Personal life ==
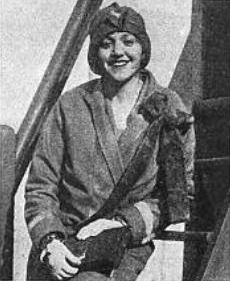
Sophie Taub Biow

Biow was a founder of the National Conference of Christians and Jews and was active with the United Jewish Appeal, the United Hospital Fund and the Muscular Dystrophy Association. He was married to Sophie (née Taub) Biow (1895-1943); they had two children, Richard Biow (married to Chinese translator and writer Adet Lin, daughter of Lin Yutang) and Patricia Broderick (married to actor James Broderick). Through his daughter Patricia, he is the grandfather of actor Matthew Broderick. He was a member of the Reform synagogue Temple Emanu-El in Manhattan.
