= Adet Lin =

Chinese-American novelist and translator

- Born: Lin Feng-ju; May 6, 1923; Amoy, Republic of China
- Died: 1971 (age 48); Taipei, Republic of China
- Cause of death: Suicide (hanging)
- Other names: Tan Yun; Lin Rusi
- Education: Columbia University
- Occupation: Novelist
- Spouse: Richard Biow (m. 1946)
- Parent(s): Lin Yutang (father); Lin Tsuifeng (mother)
- Relatives: Lin Tai-yi (sister); Lin Hsiang-ju (sister); Milton H. Biow (father-in-law); Patricia Biow Broderick (sister-in-law); James Broderick (brother-in-law); Matthew Broderick (nephew)

Adet Lin (Chinese: 林鳳如; pinyin: Lín Fèngrú; Wade–Giles: Lin Feng-ju; May 6, 1923 – 1971) was a Chinese-American novelist and translator. She also published under the name Tan Yun. She was also known as Lin Rusi.

== Biography ==
The oldest daughter of Lin Yutang, she was born in Amoy and came to the United States at the age of thirteen. With her sisters Tai-yi and Mei Mei, she published Our Family, an autobiographical work, in 1939. In 1940, with Tai-yi, she published Girl Rebel, a translation of the autobiography of Xie Bingying. The sisters published a second book, Dawn over Chungking, in 1941. After studying at Columbia University, she went on to work for the American Bureau for Medical Aid to China from 1943 to 1946. Afterwards, she returned to the United States and worked for the United States Information Agency and the Voice of America.

She published her first novel Flame from the Rock in 1943; the book is set in China during the Second Sino-Japanese War.

On May 1, 1946, she married Richard Biow, son of advertising executive Milton H. Biow.

Lin killed herself in Taipei in 1971 by hanging herself.

== Selected works ==
Her works include:

- Our Family (1939), with Lin Tai-yi (Anor Lin)
- Dawn over Chungking (1941), with Lin Tai-yi (Anor Lin) and Lin Mei Mei
- Flame from the Rock (1943), under pseudonym Tan Yun
- The Milky Way and Other Chinese Folk Tales (1961)
- Flower Shadows, translation of Tang dynasty poetry (1970)
