= Banzai, Fujian =

Banzai 坂仔镇
- Town
- Location in Fujian Banzai (China)
- Coordinates: 24°17′19″N 117°15′47″E
- Country: People's Republic of China
- Province: Fujian
- Prefecture-level city: Zhangzhou
- County: Pinghe
- Time zone: UTC+8 (China Standard)

Banzai (simplified Chinese: 坂仔镇; traditional Chinese: 阪仔鎮/坂仔鎮; pinyin: Bǎnzái zhèn; Pe̍h-ōe-jī: Póaⁿ-á-tìn) is a town in Pinghe County in the south of Fujian province, China. It lies on the Huashan River (Chinese: 花山溪; Pe̍h-ōe-jī: Hoe-soaⁿ-khoe) about 40 minutes' drive from the county seat of Xiaoxi.

== Culture & Tourism ==
The town is known as the boyhood home of 20th Century bilingual author and Renaissance man Lin Yutang.
