= Xie Bingying =

Chinese soldier and writer

- 謝冰瑩
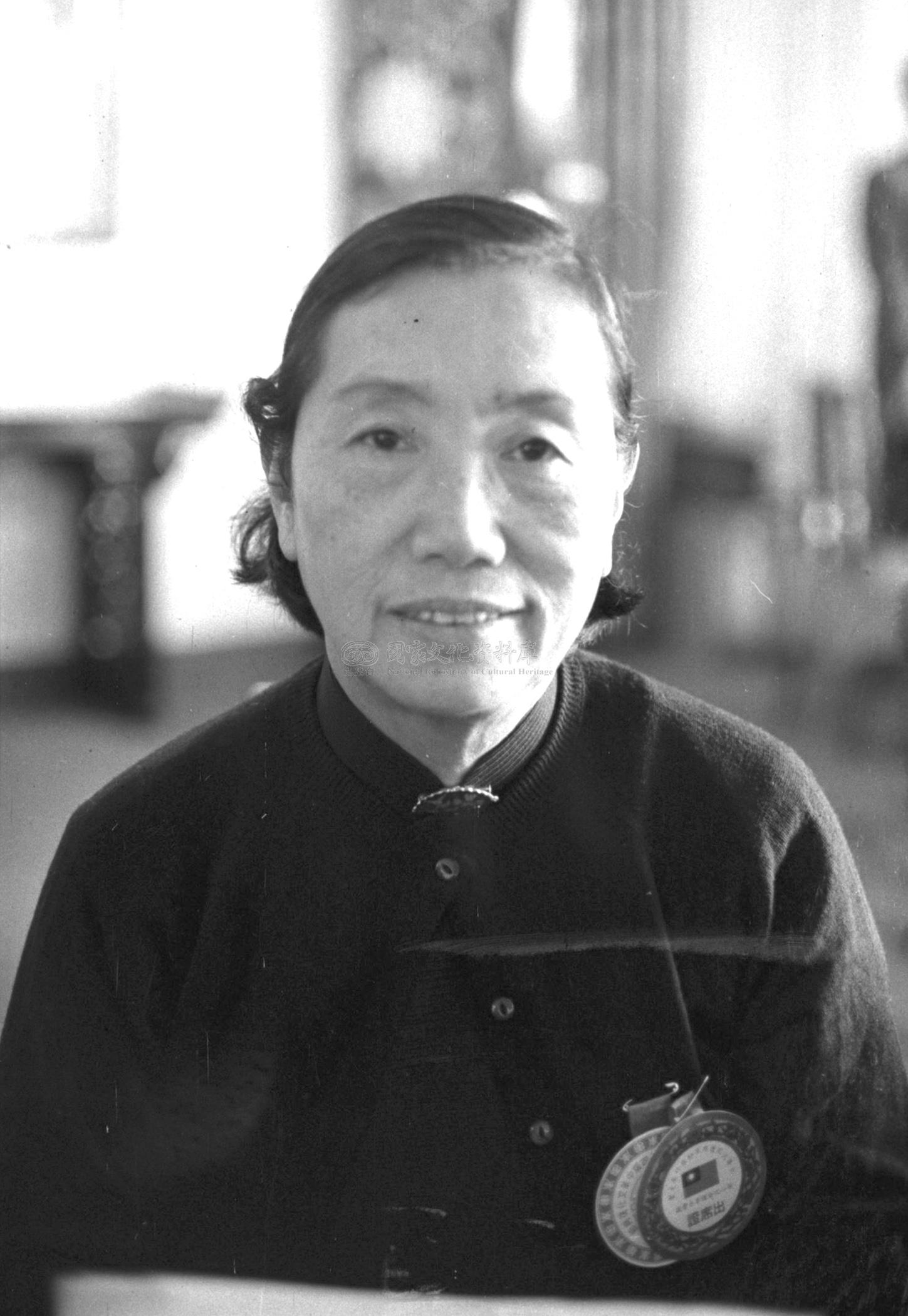
- Xie in 1969
- Born: Xie Minggang; September 5, 1906; Xinhua, Hunan, Qing China
- Died: January 5, 2000 (aged 93); San Francisco, California, U.S.

Xie Bingying, (Note: simplified Chinese: 谢冰莹; traditional Chinese: 謝冰瑩; pinyin: Xiè Bīngyíng; Wade–Giles: Hsieh Ping-ying) born Xie Minggang (Note: simplified Chinese: 谢鸣岗; traditional Chinese: 謝鳴崗; pinyin: Xie Minggang) (September 5, 1906 – January 5, 2000), courtesy name Fengbao, (Note: simplified Chinese: 风宝; traditional Chinese: 風寶; pinyin: Fengbao) was a Chinese soldier and writer. She is most well known for her autobiographies of her life as a soldier in the Nationalist Army.

== Early life ==
Xie was born in Xinhua, Loudi, Hunan, in 1906. Her father was a scholar, and she had four siblings: one older sister and three older brothers. Following the traditions and customs of the time, Xie's parents had betrothed her to the son of a family friend, Xiao Ming (simplified Chinese: 萧明; traditional Chinese: 蕭明; pinyin: Xiao Ming), at the age of three. Although her mother originally bound her feet, she rebelled against this practice and did not continue with her bindings after she went to school.

She entered school in 1916, and was the only girl in a private boys' school in her village. In 1918, she was accepted into the Datong Girls School in Changsha city, and according to her autobiographies, she was allowed to attend only after she threatened suicide. However, from there she bounced around schools in Hunan; first the Xinhua County Girls School in 1919, and then the Xinyi Girls School in Yiyang in 1920 (where she was expelled for political activism), and finally the Changsha First Provincial Girls Teacher Training School, also in 1920. In 1926, she joined the Nationalist Party's Central Military and Political Academy in Wuchang (also known as the Whampoa Military Academy), which was a training facility for Nationalist and Communist soldiers.

== Soldier and writer ==
Along with many other young women, Xie joined the Nationalist Revolutionary Army in a bout of patriotic and revolutionary fervor. She participated in the Northern Expedition of 1926, and was particularly active in the propaganda units. It was at this time that she started her autobiographical works, and segments of her writings (which were formatted as letters in a diary) were published in the Nationalist Party newspaper, the Central Daily News, in 1927. Her literary reputation started with her military diaries and letters, some of which were translated into English by Lin Yutang and published first serially in 1927 and then in book form in 1930. However, after the Nationalist purge of the Communists in 1927, her regiment was disbanded and she returned to her hometown. While at home, her parents wanted to proceed with her arranged marriage to Xiao Ming, and she was virtually imprisoned until she was married and crossed the threshold of her husband's home. In her autobiographies, she notes that her husband respected her wishes to not consummate their marriage and to consider an annulment. For a short while, she resigned herself to domestic chores and duties, until she was offered a teaching position at the Datong Girls School.

In 1928, her parents-in-law allowed her to leave the family home in order to take up the teaching job at Datong Girls School. However, instead Xie moved to Hengyang to teach grade school, and then to Shanghai. In Shanghai, she enrolled in the Chinese literature department of the Shanghai Academy of Art where she developed her writing skills. It was at this time that she published War Diary (simplified Chinese: 从军日记; traditional Chinese: 從軍日記; pinyin: Congjun riji), which was a collection of her experiences on the front lines during the Northern Expedition, and included the articles originally published in the Central Daily News. She mainly lived off the royalties of this work while she studied at the Shanghai Academy of Art. Sometime after 1929 she was the person credited with naming the young actress Wang Ying.

However, by 1929, the government of the Shanghai French Concession forced the Shanghai Academy of Art to close. Fortunately, her older brother sent her money to move to Beijing and take supplementary courses so that she could eventually enroll in the Woman's Normal University in Tianjin. She passed the entrance examination and enrolled in the university by 1930. It was during this time that she entered into a common-law marriage with an ex-army comrade, Fu Hao (simplified Chinese: 符号; traditional Chinese: 符號; pinyin: Fu Hao), with whom she had a daughter. Unfortunately, Fu Hao was arrested in 1930 because of his left-wing political views and Xie was forced to flee as well to avoid arrest by the Beijing government. She eventually left her daughter in the care of Fu's mother and went to Japan to continue her studies.

She was not in Japan for long and returned to Shanghai in 1931. During this time, she served as the editor of Women's Light, a weekly newspaper, and joined the Shanghai Writers Association of National Salvation to Resist Japan. Her writings at this time were strongly supportive of the Chinese troops fighting against the Japanese during the Shanghai Incident of 1932, and she tried to rally other writers in Shanghai towards this cause. She traveled around writing, teaching, and publishing in Fujian and Hunan, until she returned to Japan in 1935. This time, when she went to Japan she was arrested and imprisoned for three weeks because she refused to welcome Puyi and acknowledge the Japanese-controlled state of Manchukuo in Northeastern China. After she was released, she returned to China and completed her second book in 1936, entitled A Woman Soldier's Own Story (simplified Chinese: 一个女兵的自传; traditional Chinese: 一個女兵的自傳). She would publish an account of her experiences as a prisoner in 1940, in a book entitled Inside a Japanese Prison (simplified Chinese: 在日本狱中; traditional Chinese: 在日本獄中; pinyin: Zai Riben yuzhong).

By 1937, the Second Sino-Japanese War had commenced and Xie joined the war effort. She created the Hunan Women's War Zone Service Corps, which provided first aid on the front lines, and continued her work in propaganda. The Corps followed the Chinese troops as they retreated along to Yangzi River into Xi'an. By 1943, Xie had met and married Jia Yizhen (simplified Chinese: 贾伊箴; traditional Chinese: 賈伊箴; pinyin: Jia Yizhen), with whom she had a son and daughter. During this time she also edited the monthly magazine Huanghe, and published essays, fiction, and more autobiographical writings with various presses. In addition, she published the New War Diary (simplified Chinese: 新从军日记; traditional Chinese: 新從軍日記; pinyin: Xin congjun riji), which was an updated version of her previous War Diary, in 1938.

In 1948, she left to teach at National Taiwan Normal University in Taipei, and she never returned to mainland China. She later emigrated to the United States in 1974, and died in San Francisco in 2000.

== Main works ==
- Girl Rebel: the autobiography of Hsieh Pingying, with extracts from her new war diaries (Adet and Anor Lin), Da Capo Press, New York, 1940
- Autobiography of a Chinese Girl: a genuine autobiography (Tsui Chi), G. Allen & Unwin, London, 1943
- A Woman Soldier's Story: The Autobiography of Xie Bingying, translated by Lily Chia Brissman and Barry Brissman, Columbia University Press, New York, 2001.

== Sources ==
- Edwards, Louise (2016). Women Warriors and Wartime Spies of China. Cambridge: Cambridge University Press. ISBN 9781107146037.
- Xie, Bingying (2001). A Woman Soldier's Own Story: The Autobiography of Xie Bingying. Translated by Brissman, Lily Chia; Brissman, Barry. New York: Columbia University Press. ISBN 978-0231122504.
- Wang, Jing M. (2008). When "I" Was Born: Women's Autobiography in Modern China. Madison: The University of Wisconsin Press. ISBN 978-0-299-22510-0.
