= A Leaf in the Storm =

1941 novel by Lin Yutang

- First Edition (publ. John Day)
- Author: Lin Yutang
- Genre: War Novel
- Set in: Beijing
- Published: 1941
- Publisher: John Day Company
- Preceded by: Moment in Peking

A Leaf in the Storm, a Novel of War-Swept China is a novel written in English by Lin Yutang, published in 1941 by John Day Company. Set in Beiping (Beijing) when it was controlled by the Japanese, the novel describes the years of the Second Sino-Japanese War before the American entrance in 1941. It is a sequel to Lin's Moment in Peking.

== Plot ==
The scene opens in Peking (Beiping) in 1937, on the eve of the war with Japan, when there was fierce debate over China's best strategy. Yao Poya, a wealthy but patriotic businessman, and Lao Peng, who is a Chan Buddhist but angry and actively supporting the guerrilla resistance, are sharing a dinner and chouyin "drinking in sorrow". They mourn his retreats and military blunders, but Chiang Kai-shek is their hero. They resign themselves to his strategy of wearing down the Japanese Army and forcing them to brutalize and alienate the Chinese people. [5, 13]

In spite of the fact that he is married, Poya is smitten with Malin, a young lady of shadowy background who has been forced to leave Shanghai when she was suspected of being a Japanese collaborator. Lao Peng uses his guerrilla connections to convey her out of Beiping. They watch a political training class for boy and girl students who were "starting life anew as if human civilization had not existed before – except for their flashlights and fountain pens... It was freedom of the human spirit they were seeking, and they found it.". Their instructor, Comrade Peng, works with the Communist Eighth Route Army. Malin and Lao Peng proceed to Wuhan, where the wartime government has set up a temporary capital, and witness Japanese atrocities and heroic Chinese resistance.

Lin gives bravado set pieces of the "greatest migration of people in all history", [215] and hot, invective against Japanese barbarism:

"Men had killed in battles since civilization began... but not until now, when God created man, had human eyes seen laughing soldiers throw a baby into the air and catch it expertly on the point of a sharp bayonet as it fell and call it sport... These things are not possible with normal men.... Not possible with gorillas." [215]

Lao Peng, now aided by Malin, provides food and refuge for the homeless, sick, and abandoned:

"So this group of scarred souls war thrown together by the accidents of war... some sick in body and some sick in soul. It was the need of food that brought this strange group together, and there were no other ties than certain common human decencies that enabled each to get along with the others." [236]

== Reception ==
The book was chosen as one of the "outstanding books on the Far East published in 1941" by the Far Eastern Quarterly.

In 1980, the literary critic and translator David Hawkes said of Leaf in the Storm that it is "by no means a bad novel" but it "seems to me inferior to Fortress Besieged [by Qian Zhongshu]—not only because it has not the same hard intelligence, but also because in Leaf in the Storm Lin Yutang's much vaunted-humour seems for once to have deserted him." Parts of the novel, Hawkes continued, "reread today like wartime propaganda," a shortcoming Hawkes attributed to the fact that it "owes much of its background to the newspapers, which are strong on major horrors but have little to say about the boredom and innumerable petty privations which make up the everyday reality of war."

The publisher sold the rights for translation into Hebrew for £10.
