= Patricia Broderick =

American playwright and painter

- Born: Patricia Biow; February 23, 1925; New York City, U.S.
- Died: November 18, 2003 (aged 78); Greenwich Village, New York City, U.S.
- Other name: Patricia Biow Broderick
- Occupations: Playwright, painter
- Years active: 1961–1996
- Spouses: Jay Kaner (m. 1945; div. 1947); James Broderick (m. 1949; died 1982)
- Children: 3, including Matthew Broderick
- Parent(s): Milton H. Biow; Sophie Taub Biow
- Relatives: Adet Lin (sister-in-law); Sarah Jessica Parker (daughter-in-law)

Patricia Broderick (February 23, 1925 – November 18, 2003) was an American playwright and painter. She was the wife of actor James Broderick and the mother of actor Matthew Broderick.

== Early life and career ==
Broderick was born Patricia Biow in New York City, the daughter of Sophie (née Taub; 1895–1943) and Milton H. Biow (1892–1976), president of an advertising firm. She has one older brother named Richard (1920–2004). Her family were Jewish immigrants from Germany and Poland. When she was 18, her mother died in 1943 at the age of 48. Her father died 33 years later when she was 51. In Mexico, Broderick studied painting with Rufino Tamayo who had been her art teacher at the Dalton School in Manhattan. She began writing plays in the 1940s and several of them were performed in New York and London. Her 1996 screenplay for Infinity was based on the life of Nobel Prize-winning physicist Richard Feynman.

Her paintings were displayed in several galleries in New York and across the country. Broderick's partner of her last six years was the painter John Wesley.

== Personal life ==
She married her first husband, Jay Kaner, in 1945, and they divorced in 1947. She married her second husband, actor James Broderick in 1949. Together they had two daughters, Martha and Janet, and one son, actor Matthew Broderick.

== Death ==
Broderick died of cancer on November 18, 2003, at her home in Greenwich Village, aged 78.
