= Chinatown Family =

1948 novel by Lin Yutang

- Author: Lin Yutang
- Language: English
- Publisher: John Day
- Publication date: 1948
- Publication place: United States
- Media type: Print

Chinatown Family is a 1948 novel by Lin Yutang set in New York City's Chinatown of the 1920s and 1930s, concerning the experiences of the Fongs, a Chinese-American family in becoming successful by hard work and endurance in a sometimes less than welcoming America.

== Plot ==
Tom, Sr. who runs a laundry on the Upper East Side, has succeeded in bringing his younger daughter (Eva) and son (Tom, Jr.) from China to New York to join him, his wife (Mother Fong), and his other children. The family succeeds in establishing itself in American culture by its hard work and devotion to democratic principles. It offers a critique of Americans who do not live up to these ideals.

The family welcomes a new daughter-in-law, Flora, an Italian-American. They say "you are like a Chinese woman" because you "work hard all day and have no quarrels with your husband and the parents." In Italy, she replies, "a padre is a padre." Another Fong brother becomes an insurance salesman, who becomes infatuated with a nightclub dancer who is interested only in material things.

Tom, Jr., the leading character, learns English with a diligence which helps Miss Cartwright, his American teacher, to "rediscover the English language." He shows up American students who do not appreciate their own language and do not work hard to master it. He paraphrases the Declaration of Independence into basic English to reveal its importance for the world. He has to learn Mandarin Chinese in addition to his Cantonese to court Elsie, who came from Shanghai, and then has to study literature, both Walt Whitman and Laozi.

In the late 1930s, when the Japanese army is invading China, Elsie leaves to return to her homeland to support the war effort.

Tom, Sr. is hit by a car while crossing the street, "dying a typically American death." The mother of the driver shows up to offer the family compensation money, enough to send Tom, Jr., to college and to finance the opening of their restaurant in Chinatown.

== Critical reception ==
The Chinese American themes have earned it thoughtful critical attention. Cheng Lok Chua points out that Lin identified with the Fongs as immigrants and showed his solidarity with them as working-class Chinese. He adds that Lin bent reality at a time when immigration laws would have prevented Tom, Sr. from bringing his wife and children.

Lin himself was the victim of American discrimination and humiliation, which make the genial tone of the novel quite remarkable, perhaps even disingenuous. Richard Jean So traces Lin's composition of the manuscript and finds that his publisher, Richard Walsh, had suggested to Lin that he write a novel as a way to instruct Americans about Chinese Americans. David Palumbo-Liu observes that such Asian Americans (later called the "model minority") serve "both to prove the rightness of American democracy as a worldwide model and to remind Americans of the traditional values it has cast aside in the rush to modernization."
