= Lin Tai-yi =

Chinese-American writer, editor and translator

- Born: April 1, 1926; Beijing, Republic of China
- Died: July 2003 (aged 77)
- Other names: Anor Lin; Lin Wu-Shuang
- Education: Columbia University
- Occupations: Novelist, Magazine Editor-in-Chief
- Children: 2
- Parent(s): Lin Yutang (father); Lin Tsuifeng (mother)
- Relatives: Adet Lin (sister); Lin Hsiang-ju (sister)

Lin Tai-yi (Chinese: 林太乙; pinyin: Lín Tàiyǐ; April 1, 1926 – July 2003) was a Chinese-American writer, editor and translator. She was also known as Anor Lin or Lin Wu-Shuang.

The daughter of Lin Yutang, she was born in Beijing and moved to the United States with her family when she was ten. Lin was educated at Columbia University. She taught Chinese at Yale. She married Richard Ming Lai, a Hong Kong official and the couple moved to Hong Kong. Lin was the Editor-in-Chief for the Hong Kong Reader's Digest from 1965 to 1988. She also wrote for various magazines. Lin and her family moved to Washington, D.C., in 1988.

She wrote her first novel War Tide (1943) at the age of 17.

Her sister Adet Lin was also a writer. The two sisters translated Girl Rebel, the autobiography of Xie Bingying.

== Selected works ==
- Our Family, autobiography (1939) with Adet Lin and Mei Mei Lin
- Dawn over Chungking, autobiography (1941) with Adet Lin
- War Tide, novel (1943)
- The Golden Coin, novel (1946)
- The Eavesdropper, novel (1959)
- The Lilacs Overgrow, novel (1960)
- Kampoon Street, novel (1964)
