= Luxi, Fujian =

Luxi 芦溪镇
- Town
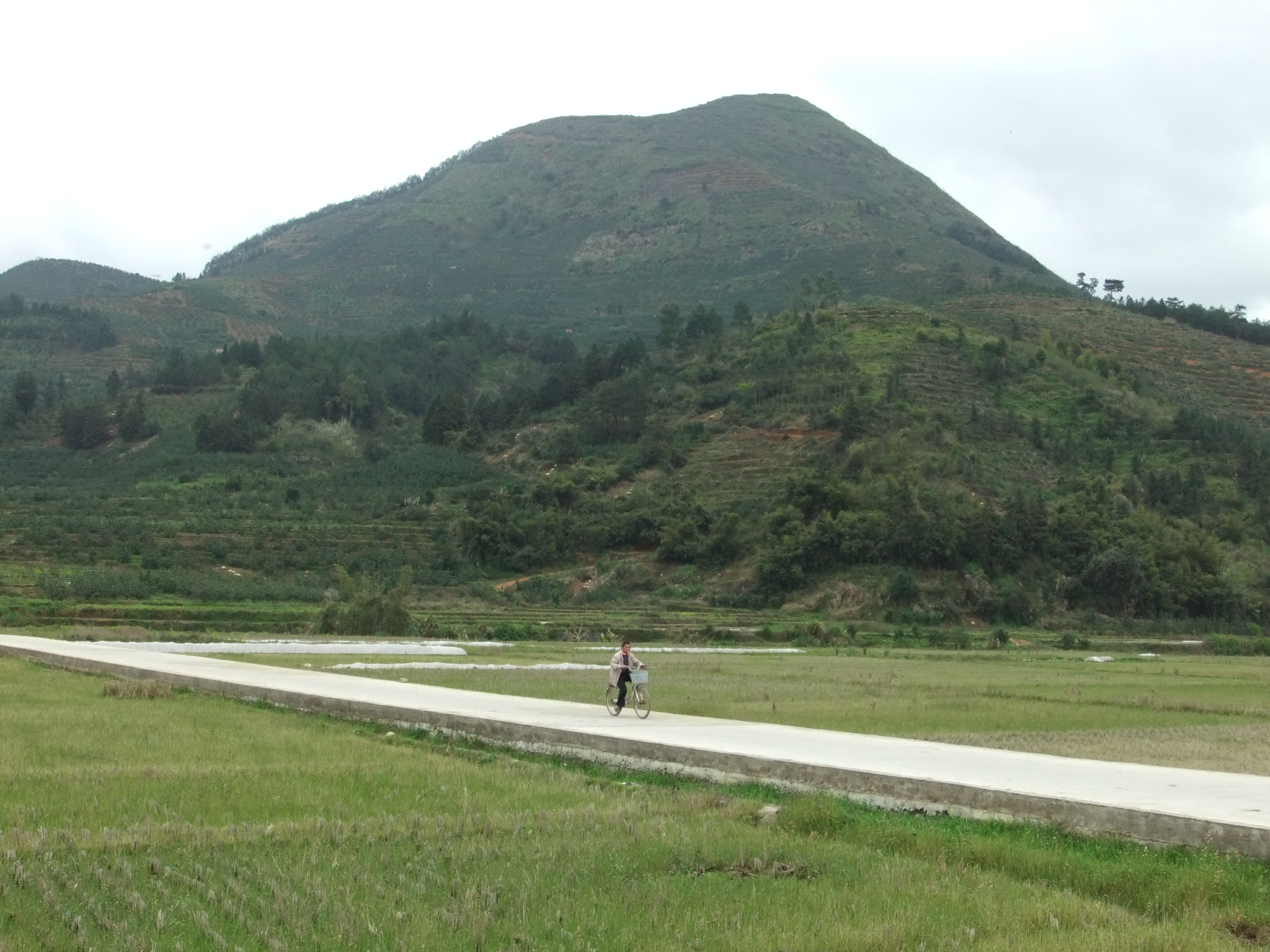
- In the country north of Luxi town

- Location in Fujian Luxi (China)
- Coordinates: 24°29′00″N 117°02′06″E
- Country: People's Republic of China
- Province: Fujian
- Prefecture-level city: Zhangzhou
- County: Pinghe
- Elevation: 444 m (1,457 ft)
- Time zone: UTC+8 (China Standard)

Luxi Town (simplified Chinese: 芦溪镇; traditional Chinese: 蘆溪鎮; pinyin: Lúxī Zhèn; Pe̍h-ōe-jī: Lô͘-khe-tìn) is a township-level division of Pinghe County, in the south of Fujian Province, China.

Luxi Town is located in the mountainous northwestern corner of Pinghe County. In the north and west, its territory borders on Nanjing County and Yongding County.

The town's name comes from the eponymous creek (Luxi (芦溪), literally, "Reed Creek"; cf. Lugou Bridge in Beijing), which flows here into the Mei River (Meihe; not to be confused with Meijiang, of the same system). The Meihe flows to the southwest, eventually leaving Fujian and entering Guangdong, where it becomes known as the Meitan River and becomes one of the 3 rivers whose confluence forms the Han River. The town is served by Fujian Provincial Highway 309 (S309).

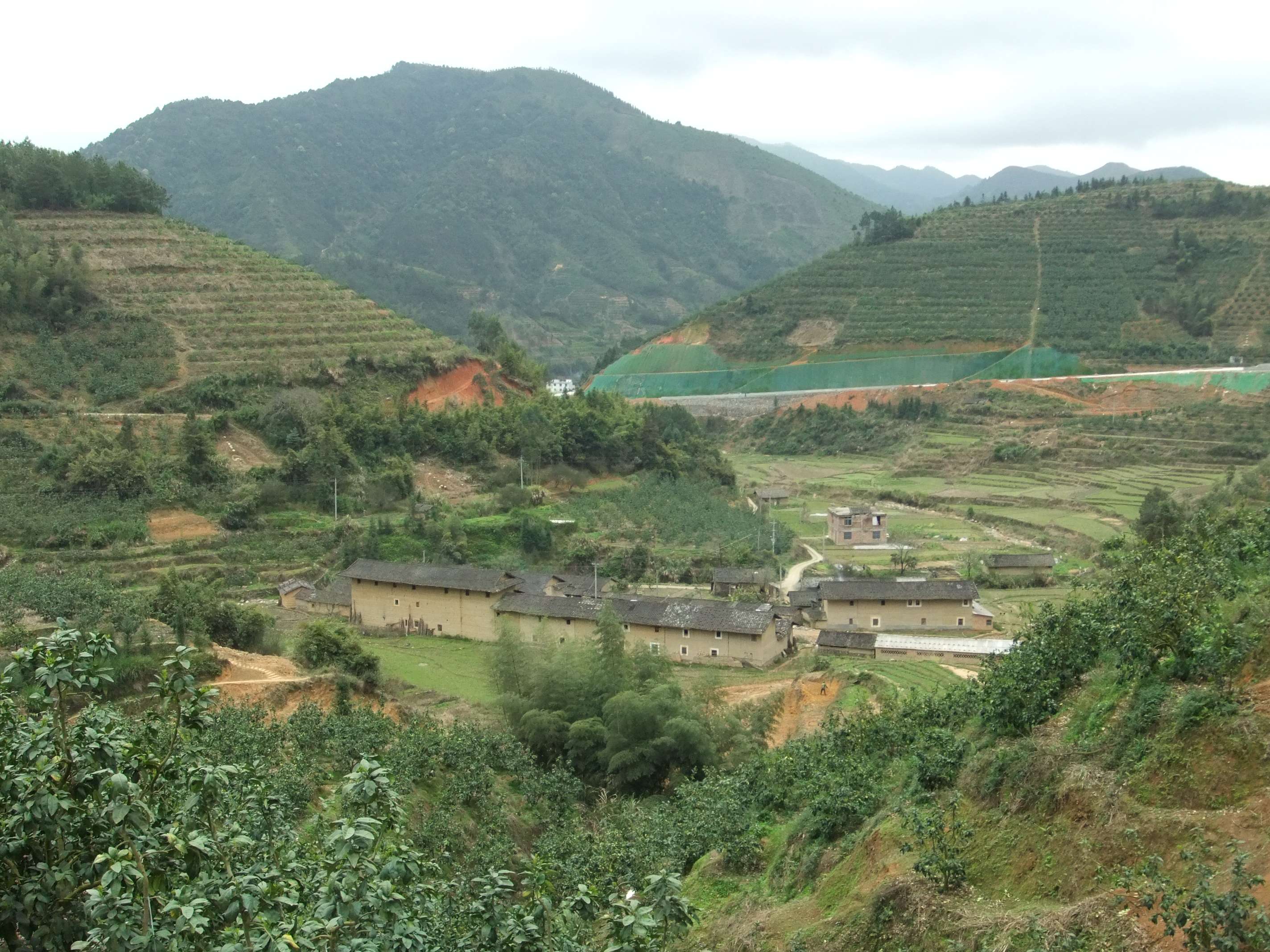
Hengkeng, a farmstead in the mountains near the border with Yongding County.

== See also ==
- List of township-level divisions of Fujian
