= Lin Hsiang-ju =

Chinese-American biochemist and author

- Born: 1930 (age 95–96); Shanghai, Republic of China
- Other names: Mei Mei; Lin Xiang-Ru
- Education: Columbia University; Harvard University
- Occupation: Biochemist
- Parents: Lin Yutang (father); Lin Tsuifeng (mother)
- Relatives: Adet Lin (sister); Lin Tai-yi (sister)

Lin Hsiang-ju (Chinese: 林相如; Wade–Giles: Lin Hsiang-ju; Born 1930 ) is a Chinese American biochemist and Author.

The youngest daughter of Lin Yutang, Lin Hsiang-ju was born in Shanghai and moved to the United States at the age of six with her family. Along with her sisters, Adet Lin and Lin Tai-yi, they published autobiographical work “Our Family” in 1939.

Lin received a degree in chemistry from Barnard College, Columbia University then graduated with a Master of Science and Doctor of Science in biochemistry from Harvard University. After graduation, she was a researcher at Columbia University working for Professor Erwin Chargaff, who was noted for his groundbreaking work on DNA.

For 25 years Dr. Lin was with the University of Hong Kong Department of Pathology, where she headed the Clinical Biochemistry Unit. In 1990, she moved to Texas to work at the Baylor College of Medicine in Houston, where she worked with Dr. F. Blaine Hollinger in the Dept. of Molecular Virology. Her research there ranged from cancer to AIDS and resulted in publications in several prominent Medical Journals including The Lancet and the American Journal of Epidemiology. She retired in 2000.

Lin was a superb cook and in 1960 she and her mother, Tsuifeng Lin, published a cookbook, "Secrets of Chinese Cooking" and in 1969, the book “Chinese Gastronomy” for which her father wrote the foreword. Her authority on Chinese cuisine and its evolving history was recognized even by established institutions such as the New York Times which in a 1977 article by George Lang entitled "A Taste of China" discussed Lin's expert input on Modern China's culinary changes in the 1970s:

"I was surprised to learn that in Canton they still cook with coal and charcoal. Gas, so essential to produce the furnacelike flame heat needed for the traditional Chinese cooking technique, does not exist. When I discussed this with Mei Mei Lin(Hsiang Ju Lin) , daughter of the late Lin Yutang who knows as much about Chinese gastronomy as anyone, she told me that in the past the fire was started early in the morning and that by mealtime it had built up to such an intensity that it was a veritable blowtorch. Because such a method is considered wasteful in today's China(1977), the result obtained in the basic Chinese cooking pan, the wok, is often a stir‐braise rather than a stirfry—and a decline in quality."

Subsequently at age 85, she would publish a book on the culinary history of China in 2015 entitled Slippery Noodles. The book is a comprehensive overview of decades of Lin's research into Chinese food history from written records dating back to the 5th Century BC to cooking literature from modern day China.
