= Moment in Peking =

Novel written in English by Chinese author Lin Yutang

A Moment in Peking
- First English hardcover edition, 1939
- Author: Lin Yutang
- Language: English
- Genre: Historical novel
- Publisher: John Day
- Publication date: 1939
- Publication place: United States
- Media type: Print (Hardback & Paperback)
- Preceded by: None
- Followed by: A Leaf in the Storm

Moment in Peking is a novel originally written in English by Chinese author Lin Yutang. The novel, Lin's first, covers the turbulent events in China from 1900 to 1938, including the Boxer Uprising, the Republican Revolution of 1911, the Warlord Era, the rise of nationalism and communism, and the start of the Sino-Japanese War of 1937-1945.

== Background ==
At the repeated invitation of Pearl S. Buck, who had sponsored the publication of Lin's bestselling My Country and My People in 1935, Lin left China for New York in August, 1936 to write The Importance of Living, which was published in August 1937 to even greater success just as war broke out in China. In 1938, Lin left New York to spend a year in Paris, where he wrote Moment in Peking.

Lin wrote the book in English for a U.S. audience, yet he based it in Chinese literature and philosophy. As an exercise, before he started to compose Moment in Peking, Lin translated passages from the classic Chinese novel Dream of the Red Chamber, and followed its example in showing a spectrum of characters in their social settings and defining them through their clothing, jewelry, and footwear, and even by their language (dialect), geography (region), and foodways. Lin's eldest daughter Lin Rusi also indicates in an introductory essay to a Chinese translation of Moment in Peking that the entire book was influenced by Zhuang Zi and its message was "Life is but a dream."

Lin tries not to be overly judgemental of the characters because he recognizes that too many issues were involved in the chaotic years of early twentieth century China. There are no absolutely right or wrong characters. Each character held a piece of truth and reality and a piece of irrationality. In the preface, Lin writes that "[This novel] is merely a story of... how certain habits of living and ways of thinking are formed and how, above all, [men and women] adjust themselves to the circumstances in this earthly life where men strive but gods rule."

While Lin does not display hatred toward the Japanese, he does let events and situations affect the novel's characters to let the reader clearly see the reason the Chinese are still bitter about Japan's military past. The novel ends with a cliffhanger, letting readers hope that the major characters who fled from the coastal regions to the inland of China would survive the horrible war. In the final pages of the book Lin observes: "What an epic story was being lived through by these people of China.... And it seemed to them that their own story was but a moment in old, ageless Peking, a story written by the finger of Time itself.... In this moving mass of refugees, there was now neither rich nor poor."

The sequel, A Leaf in the Storm, published in 1941, does not follow the same characters, but takes up in 1937, at roughly the point in time when Moment in Peking leaves off.

== Main characters ==
Many characters are from three wealthy families: Yao, Tseng (Zeng), and New (Niu), but characters from other families play an integral part in the story, such as Lifu, from the Kong family.

- Yao Mulan (姚木蘭)

The protagonist of the story, Mulan, is from the wealthy Yao family. During the Boxer Uprising many people left Peking and fled to other regions to avoid the turmoil and chaos of war. On the way to Hangchow she is separated from her family and then seized and sold to a human trafficking group, Fortunately the Tseng family track her down and buy (rescue) her. The two families become close friends and possible future in-laws. Mulan is lively, beautiful, intelligent and generous, as well as responsible. Her father has always encouraged her interests, among them her interest in "oracle bones," which reveal ancient Chinese characters, and the singing of Chinese opera. Kung Lifu and his mother, Mrs.Kung are family friends of the Yaos. Both Mulan and Mochow have found Lifu to be deep, erudite, and virtuous: a promising future scholar and an interesting figure. Mulan is attracted to Lifu, but marriage and a romantic relationship had not crossed his mind. On the other hand, her reunion with her family seems so mysterious a circumstance, that on some level she feels that marriage with Sunya is fated. So with blessings from both families, she marries Sunya. Their marriage is mostly peaceful and harmonious. Together they have three children: Aman, Atung and Amei.

- Tseng Sunya (Zeng Sunya, 曾蓀亞)

Mulan's husband, Tseng Sunya, is affectionately called "Fatty" by Mulan. As the youngest son of his family, Sunya is arguably the least responsible one, but has what is called a "round character". He and Mulan had gotten to know each other well when they were children after Mulan was rescued from bandits by his parents. As the two families became increasingly close, their engagement was planned happily.

- Kung Lifu (Kong Lifu, 孔立夫)

A scholar and Yao Mochow's husband, he marries Mochow but he admires Mulan. He was a biology professor at a school in Peking and also fight for democracy and law in China. He is a member of Chiang Kai-shek's Nationalist Party.

- Yao Mochow (Yao Mochou, 姚莫愁)

Yao Mulan's sister, she is also very clever and attractive. She married Lifu, when he was a poor scholar, and unlike many marriages in the olden times, she had an eye for Lifu long before their engagement. Mochow is stable, reliable and extremely responsible. She takes care of her sick mother for years, remaining by her side. She knows her sister's love for Lifu, but she is confident in their sisterly love.

- Yao Sze-an (Yao Si'an) (姚思安)

He was a playboy when he was young. However, he has become a great Taoist monk later. He influenced Lifu very much. Sze-an was also interested in "oracle bones"

- Mrs. Yao (姚太太)

A traditional Chinese woman. She loves her oldest son, Tijen, best. She opposes Tijen and Yinpin's love, and causes her death. She becomes depressed, unable to talk, and very weak for the rest of her life.

- Shanhu(珊瑚) Shanhu is the oldest child of the Yao family. Though her family name is Xie, not Yao, she has always considered the Yaos as her real family. Her father, Mr.Xie, is a close friend of Yao Si-an's. Yao Si-an and his wife took her in and raised her along. They treated her as if she was one of their own. She is second in command when it came to daily routines in the house and has been a great help to Mrs. Yao. She was 19 years old when she married a fine young man, who died a year later and left her childless and alone. So she returned home.
- Cassia (Auntie Gui, 桂姨)

The concubine or maid in the Tseng household. She has two daughters Ailien and Lilien, who become modern ladies and married doctors.

- Tseng Wenpo (曾文伯)

A typical old Northeastern officer, honest and kind, but hates everything about foreign countries.

- Mrs. Tseng (曾太太)

The strong-willed leader of the Tseng family. She holds the family together, and she likes Mulan and Mannia, but Suyun's behavior annoys her.

- New Suyun (Niu Suyun, 牛素雲)

Her parents thought Chinya was a man who had the right character to be a successful officer, so Suyun marries him. During their marriage, she bosses and orders him around like a busboy. Suyun later becomes a friend of Inging, her second brother's concubine. She divorces Chinya, and becomes an officer's concubine and also the infamous Japanese-controlled heroin dealer known as the "White Powder Queen." When she finally recognizes her mistake she is killed by the Japanese army.

- Sun Mannia (孫曼娘)

Married to the Tseng's eldest son, Pingya. She becomes a widow the week after her wedding. She adopts a child, Asuan, and remains in the Tseng family. She commits suicide during the Japanese war, and remains a virgin till her death.

- New Huaiyu (牛懷瑜)

The second son of the New family. He leaves his wife and four children, and marries a singsong girl (also a prostitute) named Niu Inging (牛鶯鶯). He betrays his country, and is nearly killed by his eldest son.

- Tseng Chinya (Zeng Jinya, 曾經亞)

The second son of the Tseng family, a weak character who asks just to have a peaceful life. He was kind to everybody. He falls in love with Anxiang.

- Tseng Pingya (曾平亞)

The eldest son of the Tseng family. He loves Manni but dies the week after his wedding.

- Anxiang (暗香)

Kidnapped when she was a child, and meets Mulan. When Mulan is saved by Mr. Tseng, Dim Fragrance is sold to another family. She becomes a nursery maid of Mulan's child some years later. She finally found her family, and becomes Jinya's second wife.

- Tsao Lihua (Cao Lihua, 曹麗華)

A young art student. She meets Sunya in Hangzhou, and falls in love with him. Sunya lies to her that his wife was an old and fat country woman. When she met Mulan, she is surprised, and eventually became her friend.

- Yao Tijen (Yao Tiren, 姚體仁)

Mulan's older brother, a selfish dandy. His father sent him to England to study, but he spent all of the money in Hong Kong. He falls in love with his servant girl Yinpin, and has a son with her. Their love is opposed by his mother. After Yinpin's suicide, he works hard in his uncle's drug store and dies in an accident.

- Afei (阿非，姚非)

Mulan's younger brother.

- Tung Paofen (Dong Baofen, 董寶芬)

A Manchu princess. Her family once owned the gardens which became the Yao's later. Her family believed that there were great treasures buried in the garden, and sent her to Yao family to work as a servant girl and to find the treasure. She marries Afei after Hongyu's death.

- Hongyu (紅玉)

Mulan, Mochow, and Afei's cousin. She is madly in love with Afei, and admires the famous character Lin Daiyu from the classic novel Dream of the Red Chamber (紅樓夢). When she misunderstands a conversation and thinks that Afei doesn't love her, she drowns herself, or so it seems. She dies in vain, leaving her parents devastated. Her death provides a reflection on the Yaos: ill-mannered, irresponsible, negligent. The so-called blood-ties are so weak when it comes to real commitment.

== Reception and influence ==
Time magazine wrote that Moment in Peking is "modeled exactly on traditional Chinese novels," which are among the world's longest, oldest, and most thickly populated with characters. The novel, "far superior to Author Lin's whimsical The Importance of Living, may well become the classic background novel of modern China." The magazine named it as one of nine novels that were "Books of the Year" in 1939. Others included Finnegans Wake by James Joyce and The Grapes of Wrath by John Steinbeck.

The New York Times reviewer wrote that "Mr. Lin has filled some 800 pages with a picturesque and leisurely account of how contemporary China grew and learned to live and adjusted itself to the fact, as he says in a preface, that 'men strive but the gods rule.'" The old has given way to the new, the review goes on, but Lin does not try to say which is right or wrong. "By Western standards it is a somewhat formless record, not always easy to follow," but "by any standards it has strength, tolerance, humor, color, and dignity." The reader should see why, he concludes, Pearl Buck has called it "the great novel of modern China."

The scholar Zuzana Dudasova, writing in 2019, called Moment In Peking a "great novel", and went on to compare how Lin used the Daoist, Confucian, and popular elements with Pearl Buck's use of them in The Good Earth. In each, the author uses a distinctively Chinese worldview to give depth and metaphorical meanings to the story.

== Chinese translations ==
Lin originally wanted the poet Yu Dafu to do the Chinese translation, but Yu had only completed the first section when he was killed by the Japanese in World War II. Lin did not particularly like the first complete Chinese translation, which was done by 1941.

In 1977 Zhang Zhenyu, a translator from Taiwan, created what is the most popular translation today, titled Jinghua Yanyun (simplified Chinese: 京华烟云; traditional Chinese: 京華煙雲; pinyin: Jīnghuá Yānyún). It was not available in mainland China until a publisher in Jilin issued a sanitized version in 1987. The current political climate permits Shaanxi Normal University Press to publish the full translation. Yu Dafu's son Yu Fei (郁飛) finished his own translation in 1991, but his version, titled Shunxi Jinghua (simplified Chinese: 瞬息京华; traditional Chinese: 瞬息京華; pinyin: Shùnxī Jīnghuá), is not widely read.

== Adaptations ==
The novel has been adapted three times into a television drama, including a 1988 adaptation starring Angie Chiu, a 2005 adaptation starring Zhao Wei, and a 2014 adaptation starring Li Sheng.

== References and further reading ==
- Dudasova, Zuzana (2019), "Through a Cultural Looking Glass: Taoist, Confucian, and Popular Elements in Two Great Novels About China", in Gong, Qiangwei; Rose, Kate (eds.), China Beyond the Binary: Race, Gender, and the Use of Story, United Kingdom: Cambridge Scholars Publishing, pp. 79–94
