= James Broderick =

American actor (1927–1982)

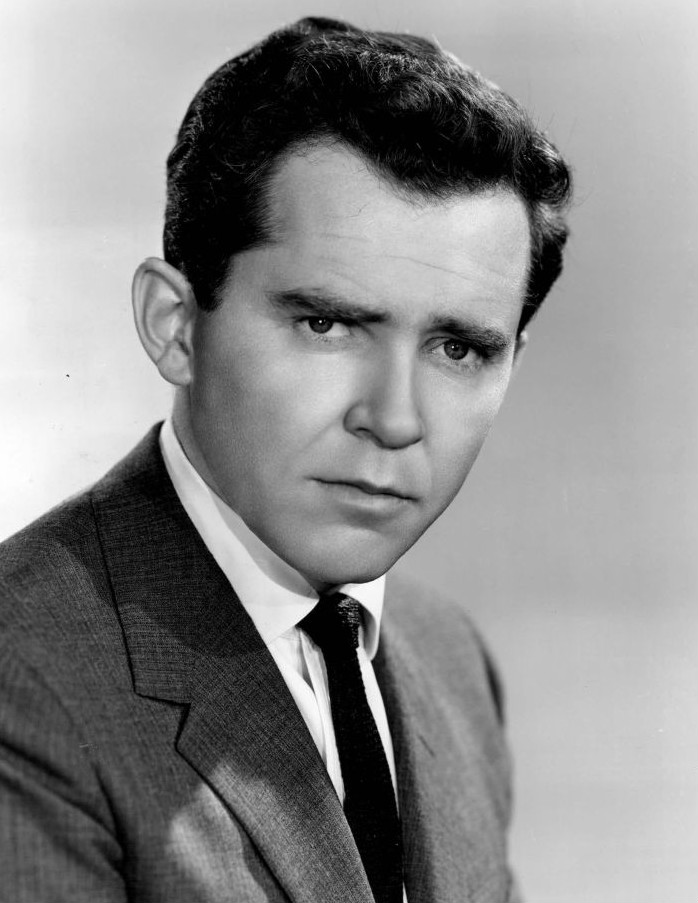
- Broderick in 1959
- Born: James Joseph Broderick III; March 7, 1927; Charlestown, New Hampshire, U.S.
- Died: November 1, 1982 (aged 55); New Haven, Connecticut, U.S.
- Other name: Jimmy Broderick
- Occupation: Actor
- Years active: 1950–1982
- Spouse: Patricia Biow (m. 1949)
- Children: 3, including Matthew Broderick
- Relatives: Milton H. Biow (father-in-law); Adet Lin (sister-in-law); Sarah Jessica Parker (daughter-in-law)

James Joseph Broderick III (March 7, 1927 – November 1, 1982) was an American actor. He is known for his role as Doug Lawrence in the television series Family, which ran from 1976 to 1980, and he played a pivotal role in the 1975 film Dog Day Afternoon.

== Life and career ==
Broderick was born in Charlestown, New Hampshire, the son of Mary Elizabeth (née Martindale; 1896–1986) and James Joseph Broderick Jr. (1895–1959). He was raised Catholic. His father, a highly decorated World War I combatant, was of Irish descent, and his mother was of English and Irish ancestry.

Broderick attended Manchester Central High School and then took pre-medical courses at the University of New Hampshire for two years. He joined the Navy in 1945, becoming a pharmacist mate.

In 1947, Broderick returned to his studies. He auditioned for a part in the University production of George Bernard Shaw's Arms and the Man. Director J. Donald Batcheller, faculty advisor to the student drama club (Mask and Dagger), was impressed and gave him the role of Bluntschli, an anti-romantic Swiss soldier. Batcheller said, "You could tell from the beginning that he was an exceptional individual. He displayed an unusual ability to get along with people. He was kind, sensitive, imaginative, and had a good sense of humor. He also had an Irish mug if I ever saw one."

Although Batcheller did not often encourage the students to pursue acting as a career, he was so sure of Broderick's talent that he suggested a trip to New York to meet Batcheller's friend Arthur Kennedy. Broderick took his advice and Kennedy subsequently directed him to the Neighborhood Playhouse, where he gained the necessary experience and training for a successful acting career in both films and television.

Broderick's Broadway credits include The Time of Your Life (1969) and Johnny No-Trump (1967).

Broderick co-starred in the CBS television series Brenner, portraying Officer Ernie Brenner. He played Doug Lawrence on the television show Family from 1976 to 1980. Broderick also served as a director for the series. He received an Emmy Award nomination for Outstanding Lead Actor in a Drama Series in 1978. Other notable television appearances included the Twilight Zone episode "On Thursday We Leave for Home" and the Public Television productions of Jean Shepherd's The Phantom of the Open Hearth and The Great American Fourth of July and Other Disasters, in which he played Ralph Parker's father, "the Old Man". The role later was played by Darren McGavin in A Christmas Story after Broderick's death; coincidentally, Broderick's son Matthew would play the Old Man's son Ralphie as an adult in the 2017 live television musical of A Christmas Story. Broderick also appeared in the “My Sister’s Keeper" episode of Gunsmoke in 1963 as a widower unable to deal with loss, and in the 1964 episode "Doctor's Wife" as a doctor saddled with an overbearing wife.

His notable film roles include Ray Brock, the complex father figure of a New England commune in Alice's Restaurant (1969), the subway motorman in The Taking of Pelham One Two Three (1974), FBI agent Sheldon in Dog Day Afternoon (1975), and Joe in The Shadow Box (1980) directed by Paul Newman.

== Personal life and death ==
Broderick married playwright and painter Patricia Broderick in 1949. The couple had one son, actor Matthew Broderick, and two daughters, Martha and Janet.

Broderick died of thyroid cancer on November 1, 1982, in New Haven, Connecticut at the age of 55.

== Selected filmography ==
| Year | Title | Role | Notes |
|---|---|---|---|
| 1960 | The Iceman Cometh | Willie Oban | TV play |
| 1960 | Girl of the Night | Dan Bolton | |
| 1963 | The Twilight Zone | Al Bains | Season 4 Episode 16: "On Thursday We Leave for Home" |
| 1964 | Gunsmoke | Dr. Wesley May, Pete Sievers | Episode: "Doctors Wife" |
| 1966 | The Group | Dr. Ridgeley | |
| 1969 | The Tree | Det. McCarthy | |
| 1969 | Alice's Restaurant | Ray Brock | |
| 1971 | The Todd Killings | Sam Goodwin | |
| 1974 | The Taking of Pelham One Two Three | Denny Doyle – Train Driver | |
| 1975 | Dog Day Afternoon | FBI Agent Sheldon | |
| 1980 | The Shadow Box | Joe | |
