= Lin Yutang =

Chinese writer, inventor, and linguist (1895–1976)

- 林語堂
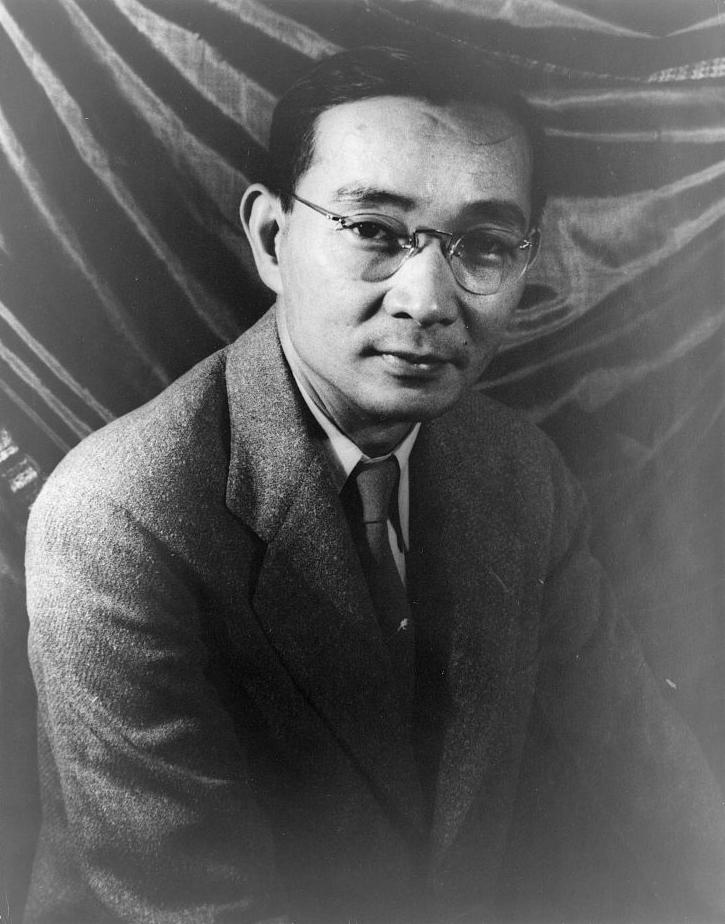
- Lin photographed in 1939 by Carl Van Vechten
- Born: 10 October 1895; Banzai, Fujian, Qing China
- Died: 26 March 1976 (aged 80); British Hong Kong
- Education: St. John's University, Shanghai (BA); Harvard University; Leipzig University (PhD)
- Occupations: Linguist, novelist, philosopher, translator
- Spouse: Lin Tsui-feng (née Liao)
- Children: Adet Lin; Lin Tai-yi; Lin Hsiang-ju

Chinese name
- Traditional Chinese: 林語堂
- Simplified Chinese: 林语堂
Transcriptions
Standard Mandarin
- Hanyu Pinyin: Lín Yǔtáng
- Bopomofo: ㄌㄧㄣˊ ㄩˇ ㄊㄤˊ
- Gwoyeu Romatzyh: Lin Yeutarng
- Wade–Giles: Lin^{2} Yü^{3}-tʻang^{2}
- IPA: [lǐn ỳ.tʰǎŋ]
Yue: Cantonese
- Jyutping: Lam4 jyu5-tong4
- IPA: [lɐm˩ jy˩˧ tʰɔŋ˩]
Southern Min
- Hokkien POJ: Lîm Gí-tông

Lin Yutang (10 October 1895 – 26 March 1976) was a Chinese writer, linguist, and inventor. A prolific bilingual writer in both Chinese and English, he was celebrated for pioneering a humorous prose style in modern Chinese literature and for serving as a cultural bridge between China and the West, most notably through My Country and My People (1935) and his English translations of Chinese classics. As a linguist, he compiled a series of ESL textbooks for Chinese learners in the 1930s and later produced an English–Chinese dictionary in the 1970s. As an inventor, he designed a Chinese typewriter, which was patented in the United States in 1952, though it was never mass-produced. From 1940 to 1973, Lin received six nominations for the Nobel Prize in Literature.

== Early life ==
Lin was born in 1895 in the town of Banzai, Fujian. His father was a Christian minister. His journey of faith from Christianity to Taoism and Buddhism, and back to Christianity in his later life was recorded in his book From Pagan to Christian (1959).

== Academia ==
Lin studied for his bachelor's degree at St. John's University, a Christian university in Shanghai. Then he received a half-scholarship to continue study for a doctoral degree at Harvard University. He later wrote that in the Widener Library he first found himself and first came alive, but he never saw a Harvard–Yale game.

In financial difficulty, he left Harvard early and moved to work with the Chinese Labour Corps in France and eventually to Germany, where he completed his requirements for a doctoral degree in Chinese philology at the University of Leipzig. From 1923 to 1926, he taught English literature at Peking University.

Enthusiastic about the success of the Northern Expedition, he briefly served in the new Nationalist government, but soon turned to teaching and writing. He found himself in the wake of the New Culture Movement which criticized certain ancient traditions as feudal and harmful. Instead of accepting this charge, Lin immersed himself in the Confucian texts and literary culture which his Christian upbringing and English language education had denied him.

His humor magazine The Analects Fortnightly (Lunyu Banyuekan, 1932–1940, 1945–1949) featured essays by writers such as Hu Shih, Lao She, Lu Xun, and Zhou Zuoren. He was one of the figures who introduced the Western concept of humor. In 1924, Lin invented the term youmo (幽默), a phono-semantic match with the English word humor. Lin used the Analects to promote his conception of humor as the expression of a tolerant, cosmopolitan, understanding and civilized philosophy of life.

In 1933, Lu Xun attacked the Analects for being apolitical and dismissed Lin's 'small essays' (小品文; xiǎopǐn wén) as "bric a brac for the bourgeoisie". Lu Xun nevertheless continued to write for the magazine.

Lin's writings in Chinese were critical of the Nationalist government to the point that he feared for his life. Many of his essays from this time were later collected in With Love and Irony (1940). In 1933, he met Pearl Buck in Shanghai, who introduced him and his writings to her publisher and future husband, Richard Walsh, head of the John Day Company.

Lin's relation with Christianity changed over the years. His father was a second-generation Christian, but at Tsinghua, Lin asked himself what it meant to be a Christian in China. He felt that being a Christian meant acceptance of Western science and progress, but also that being a Christian also meant losing touch with China's culture and his own personal identity.

On his return from study abroad, Lin renewed his respect for his father, yet he plunged into study of Confucianism, Taoism, and Buddhism and did not identify himself as Christian until the late 1950s.

== Career outside China ==
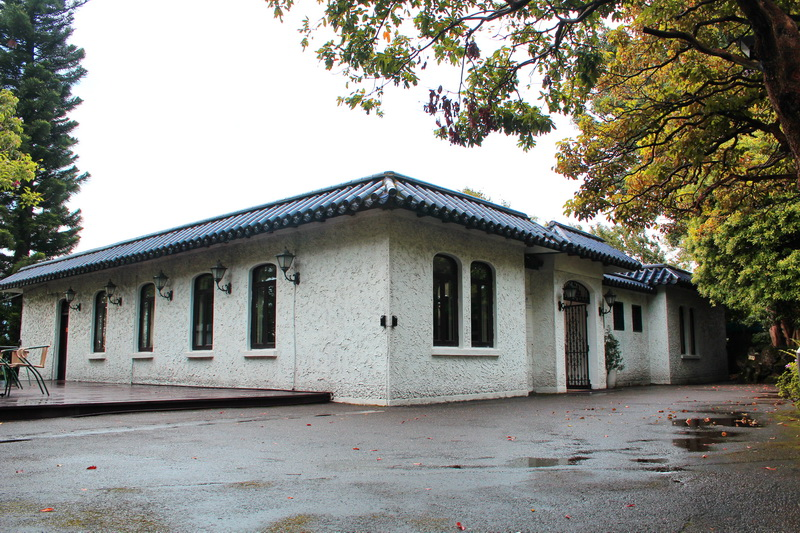
Lin Yutang House in Taipei

After 1935, Lin lived mainly in the United States, where he was a writer of Chinese philosophy and way of life. Lin wrote My Country and My People (吾國與吾民) (1935) and The Importance of Living (生活的藝術) (1937) in English. Others include Between Tears and Laughter (啼笑皆非) (1943), The Importance of Understanding (1960, a book of translated Chinese literary passages and short pieces), The Chinese Theory of Art (1967). The novels Moment in Peking (1939), A Leaf in the Storm (1940), and The Vermilion Gate (朱門) (1953) described China in turmoil while Chinatown Family (1948) presented the lives of Chinese Americans in New York. Partly to avoid controversial contemporary issues, Lin in 1947 published The Gay Genius: The Life and Times of Su Tungpo, which presented the struggle between two Song dynasty figures, Su Shi and Wang Anshi, as parallel to the struggle between Chinese liberals and totalitarian communists.

Lin's political writings in English sold fewer copies than his cultural works and were more controversial. Between Tears and Laughter (1943) broke with the genial tone of his earlier English writings to criticize Western racism and imperialism, going against the advice of his Western patrons and publisher. He vehemently criticised Churchill for refusing to extend the right to self-determination to Britain's colonies under the Atlantic Charter and also quipped that 'all you need to do to make an Englishman a gentleman again is to ship him back west of the Suez Canal'.

Following the attack on Pearl Harbor, Lin traveled in China and wrote favorably of the war effort and Chiang Kai-shek in Vigil of a Nation (1944). American China Hands such as Edgar Snow criticized the works.

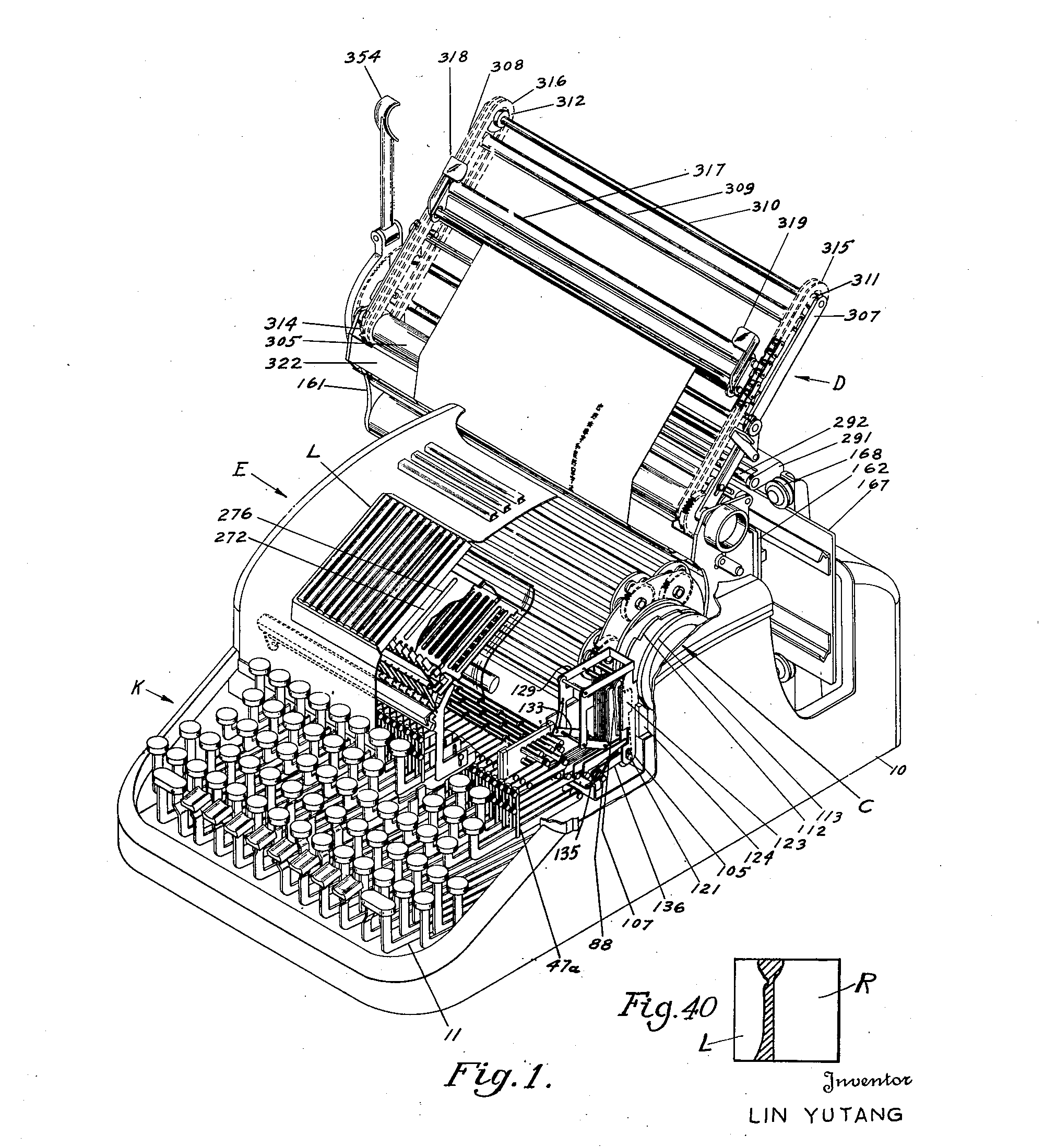
Lin's Mingkwai Chinese typewriter played a pivotal role in the Cold War machine translation research.

Lin was interested in mechanics. Since Chinese is a character-based rather than an alphabet-based language, with many thousands of separate characters, it was difficult to employ modern printing technologies. However, Lin worked on this problem for decades using a workable Chinese typewriter, brought to market in the middle of the war with Japan.

The Ming Kwai ('clear and quick') Chinese typewriter played a pivotal role in the Cold War machine translation research.

From 1954 to 1955, Lin served briefly and unhappily as president of Nanyang University, which was newly established in Singapore by Chinese business interests to provide tertiary education in Chinese studies in parallel with the English-medium University of Singapore. However, according to CIA agent Joseph B. Smith, Lin clashed with founder Tan Lark Sye and the board of trustees on the direction of the new university. Smith quoted Lin as saying "They want to indoctrinate the students not only with a love of China, that would be fine, I too love China, but they also want to concentrate all teaching on a love of Mao Tse-tung. Mao's teachings are to be the core curriculum of this college. I won't have it. I am going back to New York".

The faculty rejected Lin's plans to demolish and rebuild the new school building (which though grand, was not "Western" enough), his demands to have sole control over finances, and a budget clearly beyond its means. Lin accepted a dismissal fee of $305,203, entirely contributed by Tan Lark Sye, to prevent depleting the university's funds.

After he returned to New York in the late 1950s, Lin renewed his interest in Christianity. His wife was a devout believer, and Lin admired her serenity and humility. After attending services with her at Madison Avenue Presbyterian Church for several months, he joined the church and announced his return to the faith.

Lin presided over the compilation of a Chinese–English dictionary, Lin Yutang's Chinese–English Dictionary of Modern Usage (1972), which contains an English index to definitions of Chinese terms. The work was undertaken at the newly founded Chinese University of Hong Kong.

He continued his work until his death in 1976. Lin was buried at his home in Yangmingshan, Taipei. His home has been turned into a museum, which is operated by Taipei-based Soochow University. The town of Lin's birth, Banzai, has also preserved the original Lin home and turned it into a museum.

== Legacy ==
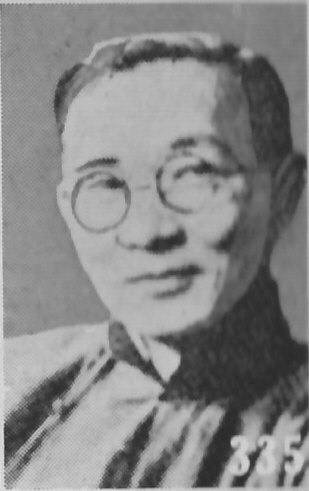
Lin Yutang as pictured in The Most Recent Biographies of Chinese Dignitaries

Although his major books have remained in print, Lin was a thinker whose place in modern Chinese intellectual history has been overlooked. (broken link) Lin themed conventions have been organized in Taiwan and Lin's native Fujian, and in December 2011, the International Conference on the Cross-cultural Legacy of Lin Yutang in China and America was held at City University of Hong Kong, with professional and private scholars from mainland China, Hong Kong, Taiwan, Japan, Malaysia, the United States, Germany and Slovakia. The organizer of the conference was Dr. Qian Suoqiao, author of the book, Liberal Cosmopolitan: Lin Yutang and Middling Chinese Modernity (Leiden; Boston: Brill, 2010). (broken link)

The first full-length academic study of Lin in English is Diran John Sohigian's "The Life and Times of Lin Yutang" (Columbia University Ph.D. diss., 1991). Jing Tsu, Sound and Script in Chinese Diaspora (Cambridge, MA: Harvard University Press, 2010) and Thomas S. Mullaney, The Chinese Typewriter: A History (Cambridge, MA: The MIT Press, 2017) give a detailed accounts of Lin Yutang in the context of late 19th century script reform, Chinese national language reform in the early twentieth century and machine translation research during the Cold War.

== Family ==
His wife, Lin Tsuifeng (née Liao) (廖翠鳳), was also an author, who, along with her daughter Lin Hsiang Ju, wrote three cook books which popularized Chinese cuisine in the English speaking world; Yutang wrote the introductions.

His first daughter Adet Lin (1923–1971) was a Chinese-American author who used the pseudonym Tan Yun. Adet Lin later committed suicide by hanging herself. Lin Yutang is the father-in-law of Matthew Broderick’s uncle.

His second daughter Lin Tai-yi (1926–2003) was also known as Anor Lin in her earliest writing and had the Chinese name Yu-ju (玉如). She was an author and the editor-in-chief of Chinese edition of the Reader's Digest from 1965 until her retirement in 1988. She also wrote a biography of her father in Chinese (林語堂傳).

His third daughter Lin Hsiang-ju (林相如; born 1930), was referred to as Meimei in childhood. She graduated with a Doctor of Science (DSc) in Biochemistry from Harvard University and later co-authored Chinese cookbooks with her Mother including Chinese Gastronomy for which her father wrote the foreword. Working as a biochemist, she became the Department Head of Pathology at the University of Hong Kong(HKU) and later as a medical researcher at the Baylor College of Medicine in Houston, Texas.

== Works ==
=== In Chinese ===
Works by Lin in Chinese or published in China to 1935 include:

- (1928) Jian Fu Collection (Shanghai: Bei Hsin Book Company)
- (1930) Letters of a Chinese Amazon and War-Time Essays (Shanghai: Kaiming)
- (1930) Kaiming English Books (Three Volumes) (Shanghai: Kaiming)
- (1930) English Literature Reader (Two Volumes) (Shanghai: Kaiming)
- (1930) Kaiming English Grammar (Two Volumes) (Shanghai: Kaiming)
- (1931) Readings in Modern Journalistic Prose (Shanghai: Oriental Book)
- (1933) A Collection of Essays on Linguistics (Shanghai: Kaiming Book)
- (1934) Da Huang Ji (Shanghai: Living)
- (1934) My Words First Volume (Sing Su Ji) (Shanghai Times)
- (1935) Kaiming English Materials (Three Volumes) co-written by Lin Yutang and Lin you-ho (Shanghai: Oriental Book Co.)
- (1935) The Little Critic: Essays Satires and Sketches on China First Series: 1930–1932 (Shanghai: Oriental Book Co.)
- (1935) The Little Critic: Essays Satires and Sketches on China Second Series: 1933–1935 (Shanghai: Oriental Book Co.)
- (1935) Confucius Saw Nancy and Essays about Nothing (Shanghai: Oriental)
- (1936) My Words Second Volume (Pi Jing Ji) (Shanghai Times)
- (1966) Ping Xin Lun Gao e (Taiwan: Wenxing Bookstore)
- (1974) A Collection of Wu Suo Bu Tan (Taiwan: Kai Ming Book Company)

=== Works in English ===
Works by Lin in English include:

- (1935) My Country and My People, Reynal & Hitchcock
- (1936) A Nun of Taishan and Other Translations, Commercial Press, Shanghai
- (1936) A History of the Press and Public Opinion in China, Kelly and Walsh
- (1937) The Importance of Living, Reynal & Hitchcock
- (1939) The Wisdom of Confucius, Random House, The Modern Library
- (1939) Moment in Peking, John Day Company
- (1940) With Love & Irony, John Day Company
- (1941) A Leaf in the Storm, John Day Company
- (1942) The Wisdom of China and India, Random House
- (1943) Between Tears & Laughter, John Day Company, ((1945), published in London by Dorothy Crisp & Co.)
- (1944) The Vigil of a Nation, John Day Company
- (1947) The Gay Genius: The Life and Times of Su Tungpo, John Day Company
- (1948) Chinatown Family, A John Day Book Company
- (1948) The Wisdom of Laotse, Random House
- (1948) Gay Genius: The Life and Times of Su Tungpo, William Heinemann Ltd.
- (1950) On the Wisdom of America, John Day Company
- (1950) Miss Tu, William Heinemann Limited
- (1951) Widow, Nun and Courtesan: Three Novelettes From the Chinese Translated and Adapted by Lin Yutang, A John Day Book Company
- (1952) Famous Chinese Short Stories, retold by Lin Yutang, John Day Company, reprinted 1952, Washington Square Press
- (1952) Widow Chuan, William Heinemann Limited
- (1953) The Vermilion Gate, A John Day Book Company
- (1955) Looking Beyond, Prentice Hall (Published in England as The Unexpected Island, Heinemann)
- (1957) Lady Wu, William Heinemann Limited
- (1958) The Secret Name, Farrar, Straus and Cudahy
- (1959) The Chinese Way of Life, World Publishing Company
- (1959) From Pagan to Christian, World Publishing Company
- (1960) Imperial Peking: Seven Centuries of China, Crown Publishers
- (1960) The Importance of Understanding, World Publishing Company
- (1961) The Red Peony, World Publishing Company
- (1962) The Pleasures of a Nonconformist, World Publishing Company
- (1963) Juniper Loa, World Publishing Company
- (1964) The Flight of Innocents, Putnam's Publishing Company
- (1967) The Chinese Theory of Art, Putnam's Publishing Company
- (1972) Chinese-English Dictionary of Modern Usage, Chinese University of Hong Kong and McCraw
- (1928–1973) Red Chamber Dream

== See also ==
- Gwoyeu Romatzyh

== Portrait ==
- Lin Yutang. A Portrait by Kong Kai Ming at Portrait Gallery of Chinese Writers (Hong Kong Baptist University Library).
