= Pinghe County =

Pinghe County 平和县 Pinghwo; Pingho
- County
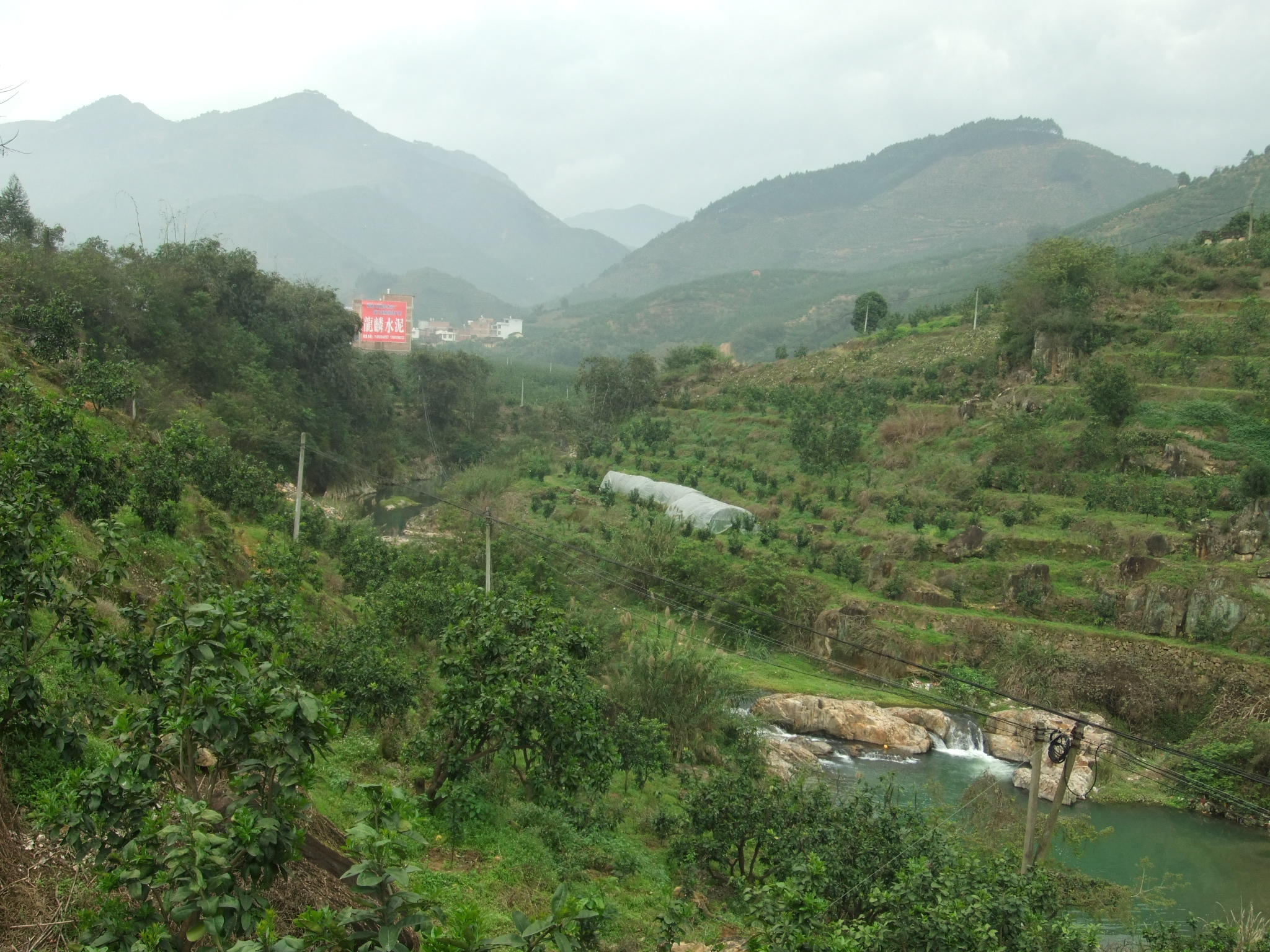
- Jinxi Creek Valley west of Xiaoxi Town

- Location in Fujian
- Coordinates: 24°21′48″N 117°18′54″E
- Country: People's Republic of China
- Province: Fujian
- Prefecture-level city: Zhangzhou

Area
  - Total: 1,957 km^{2} (756 sq mi)

Population (2020 census)
  - Total: 455,042
  - Density: 232.5/km^{2} (602.2/sq mi)
- Time zone: UTC+8 (China Standard)

Pinghe County (simplified Chinese: 平和县; traditional Chinese: 平和縣; pinyin: Pínghé Xiàn; Pe̍h-ōe-jī: Pêng-hô-koān) is a county of the prefecture-level city of Zhangzhou, in southern Fujian province, PRC, bordering Guangdong province to the west.

== Administrative Division ==
Historical population
Year	Pop.	±%
2000	532,649	—
2010	498,533	−6.4%
2020	455,042	−8.7%

The administrative centre or seat of Pinghe County is Xiaoxi (小溪镇).

=== Towns (镇, zhen) ===
Most of Pinghe's old People's communes, after spending the 80s and even 90s as Townships, have been upgraded to Towns. There are ten towns:

- Xiaoxi (小溪 Sió-khe)
- Wenfeng (文峰 Bûn-hong)
- Shange (山格 Soaⁿ-keeh)
- Nansheng (南胜 Lâm-sèng)
- Banzai (坂仔 Póaⁿ-á)
- Anhou (Mandarin 安厚 Ānhòu, Hokkien 庵后 Am-āu)
- Daxi (大溪 Tōa-khe)
- Jiufeng (九峰 Kiú-hong)
- Xiazhai (Mandarin 霞寨 Xiázhài, Hokkien 下寨 Ēe-chēe)
- Luxi (芦溪 Lô͘-khe)

=== Townships (乡, xiang) ===
There are five townships:

- Wuzhai (五寨 Gō͘-chēe)
- Guoqiang (国强 Kok-kiâng, originally 高坑 Ko-kheng)
- Qiling (崎岭 Kiā-niá)
- Changle (长乐 Tióⁿ-lo̍h)
- Xiufeng (秀峰 Siù-hong)

== Climate ==
Climate data for Pinghe, elevation 109 m (358 ft), (1991–2020 normals, extremes 1981–present)
Month	Jan	Feb	Mar	Apr	May	Jun	Jul	Aug	Sep	Oct	Nov	Dec	Year
Record high °C (°F)	30.8 (87.4)	31.8 (89.2)	33.7 (92.7)	36.2 (97.2)	38.7 (101.7)	38.7 (101.7)	39.7 (103.5)	39.3 (102.7)	37.6 (99.7)	35.4 (95.7)	34.3 (93.7)	31.1 (88.0)	39.7 (103.5)
Mean daily maximum °C (°F)	19.3 (66.7)	20.2 (68.4)	22.4 (72.3)	26.5 (79.7)	29.5 (85.1)	31.9 (89.4)	34.2 (93.6)	33.7 (92.7)	32.1 (89.8)	28.9 (84.0)	25.3 (77.5)	20.9 (69.6)	27.1 (80.7)
Daily mean °C (°F)	13.7 (56.7)	14.8 (58.6)	17.1 (62.8)	21.2 (70.2)	24.5 (76.1)	27.2 (81.0)	28.7 (83.7)	28.1 (82.6)	26.7 (80.1)	23.3 (73.9)	19.5 (67.1)	15.1 (59.2)	21.7 (71.0)
Mean daily minimum °C (°F)	10.0 (50.0)	11.2 (52.2)	13.5 (56.3)	17.4 (63.3)	21.0 (69.8)	23.8 (74.8)	24.7 (76.5)	24.5 (76.1)	23.1 (73.6)	19.2 (66.6)	15.4 (59.7)	11.1 (52.0)	17.9 (64.2)
Record low °C (°F)	−1.2 (29.8)	1.4 (34.5)	0.8 (33.4)	9.3 (48.7)	13.6 (56.5)	17.3 (63.1)	21.8 (71.2)	21.6 (70.9)	17.0 (62.6)	10.2 (50.4)	2.7 (36.9)	−2.9 (26.8)	−2.9 (26.8)
Average precipitation mm (inches)	52.6 (2.07)	75.2 (2.96)	124.7 (4.91)	156.4 (6.16)	208.8 (8.22)	277.8 (10.94)	205.6 (8.09)	300.0 (11.81)	195.5 (7.70)	55.5 (2.19)	45.5 (1.79)	45.1 (1.78)	1,742.7 (68.62)
Average precipitation days (≥ 0.1 mm)	8.7	12.3	15.6	15.2	17.6	18.9	14.2	17.9	12.9	5.8	5.9	7.1	152.1
Average relative humidity (%)	77	79	80	79	81	81	77	80	79	75	76	76	78
Mean monthly sunshine hours	124.0	95.4	98.7	115.1	126.7	144.3	216.5	192.0	176.3	180.7	155.5	139.2	1,764.4
Percentage possible sunshine	37	30	26	30	31	35	52	48	48	51	48	42	40
Source: China Meteorological Administration All-time May high

== Economy ==
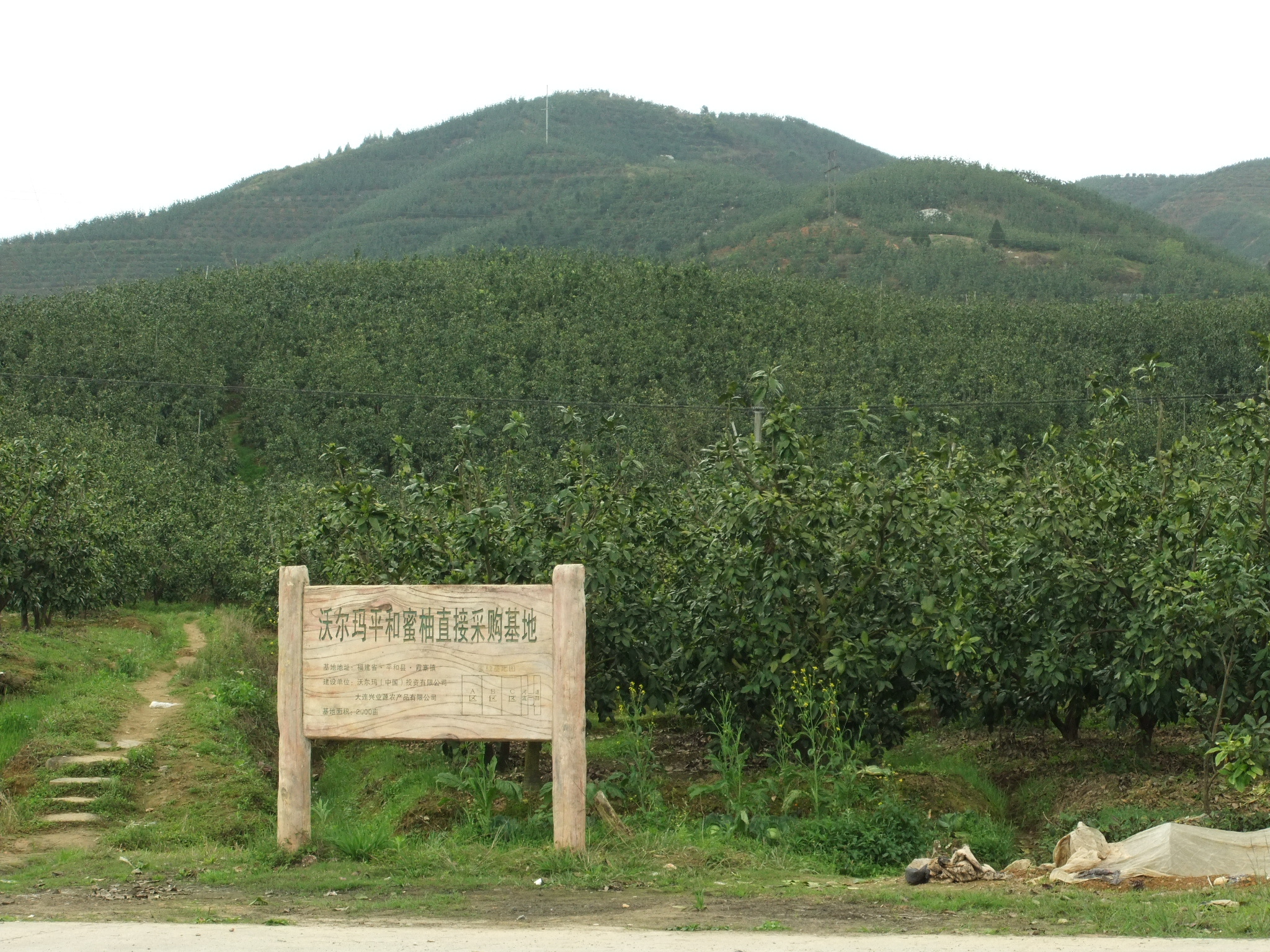
A "Pinghe County honey pomelo" orchard near Xiazhai Town, with a sign indicating that this is where Walmart China sources its pomelos

Pinghe County is famous for its pomelos.

== Tulou ==
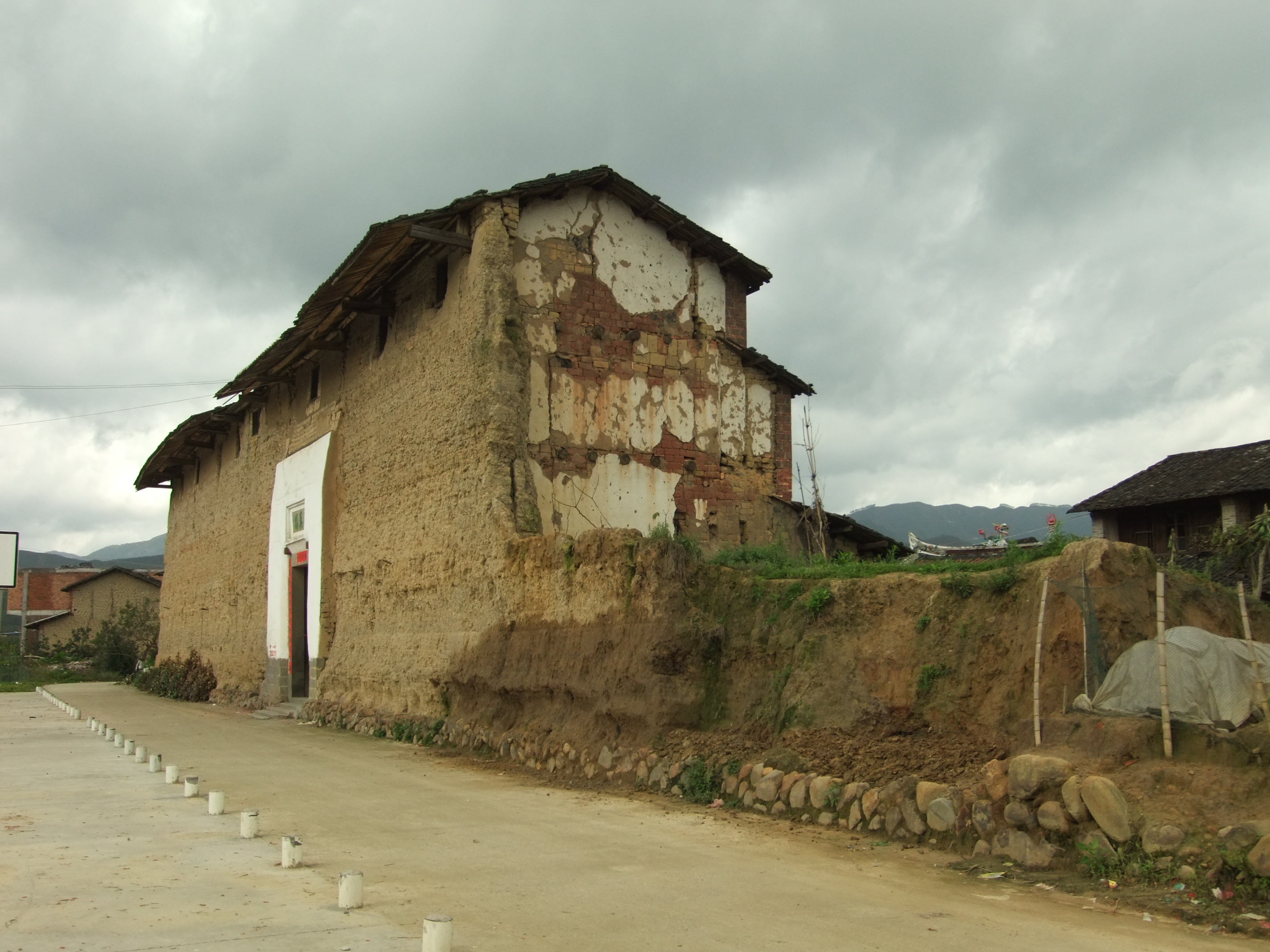
Surviving section of the front (southern) wall of Xishuang Lou

Numerous Fujian Tulou, earth buildings of round, rectangular and other shapes, can be found within Pinghe County, primarily in its western part (viz., various villages of Luxi, Xiazhai, Jiufeng and Daxi Towns). One of them, the Xishuang Lou (西爽楼), located in Xi'an Village a few kilometers north of Xiazhai town center, has been described by some researchers as the "largest of the rectangular [tulou] in existence". Unfortunately, only parts of the compound have survived to this day.

== Notable people ==
- Chen Yifei (陳義飛), scholar and senior official of Ming dynasty (AD 1368-AD 1644)
- Lai Ching-te (賴清德), president of the Republic of China, born in Taiwan, his great-great-grandfather migrated to Taiwan from Pinghe County.
