= Xiazhai, Fujian =

Xiazhai 霞寨
- Town (China)

Chinese transcription(s)
  - Chinese: 霞寨镇
  - Pinyin: Xiázhài zhèn
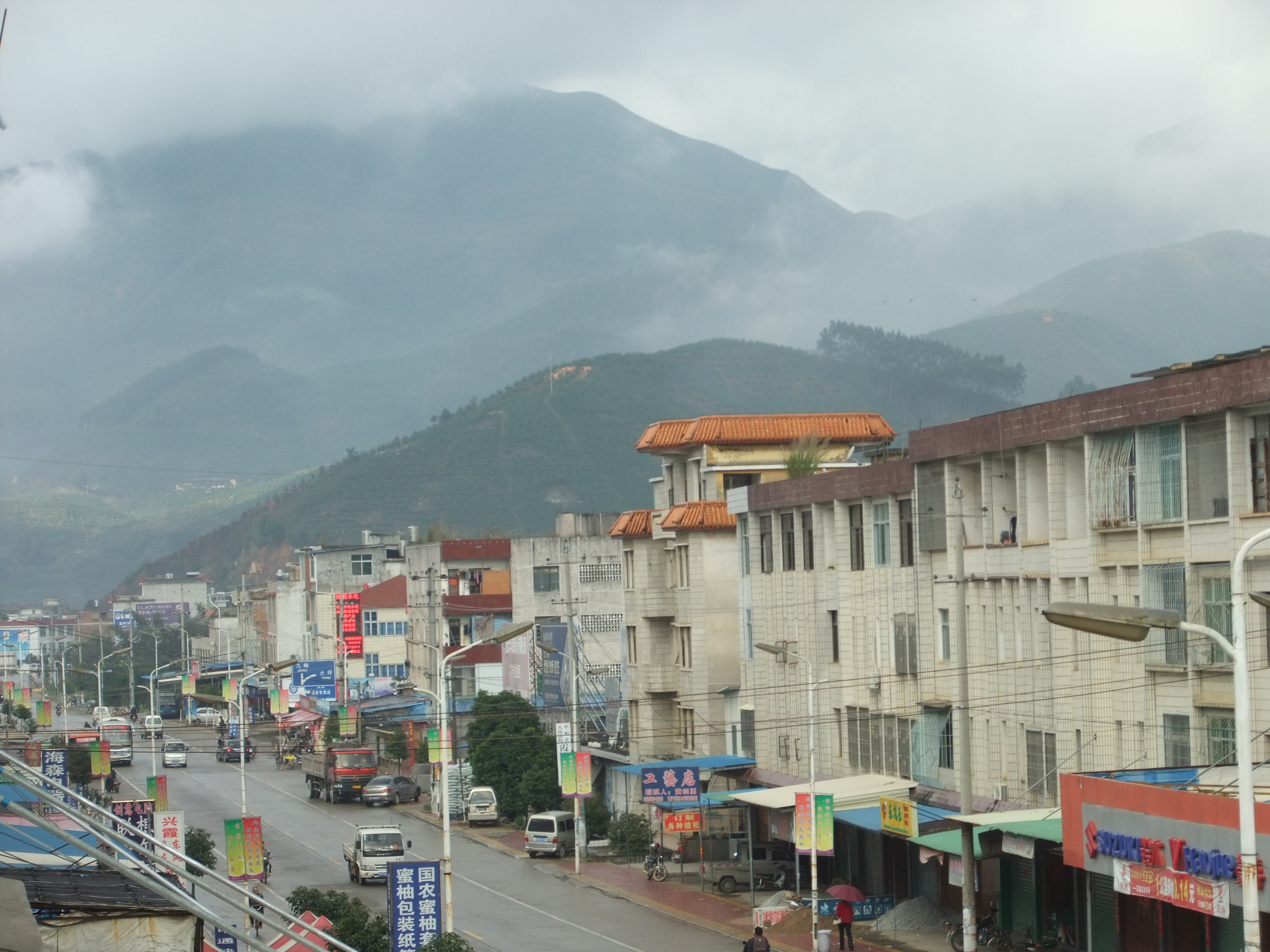
- Xiazhai Town's main street, looking west

- Location in Fujian Xiazhai (China)
- Coordinates: 24°20′00″N 117°10′00″E
- Country: China
- Province: Fujian
- Prefecture: Zhangzhou
- County: Pinghe
- Time zone: UTC+8 (China Standard Time)

Xiazhai Town (Mandarin 霞寨镇, Hokkien 下寨镇 Ēe-chēe-tìn) is a township-level division of Pinghe County, Zhangzhou City, Fujian Province, China.

== Tulou ==
Numerous Fujian Tulou, earth buildings of round, rectangular and other shapes, can be found within the administrative borders of Xiazhai Town. One of them, Xishuang Lou (西爽楼), located in Xi'an Village a few kilometers north of Xiazhai town center, has been described by some researchers as the "largest of the rectangular [tulou] in existence". Only parts of the compound have survived to this day.

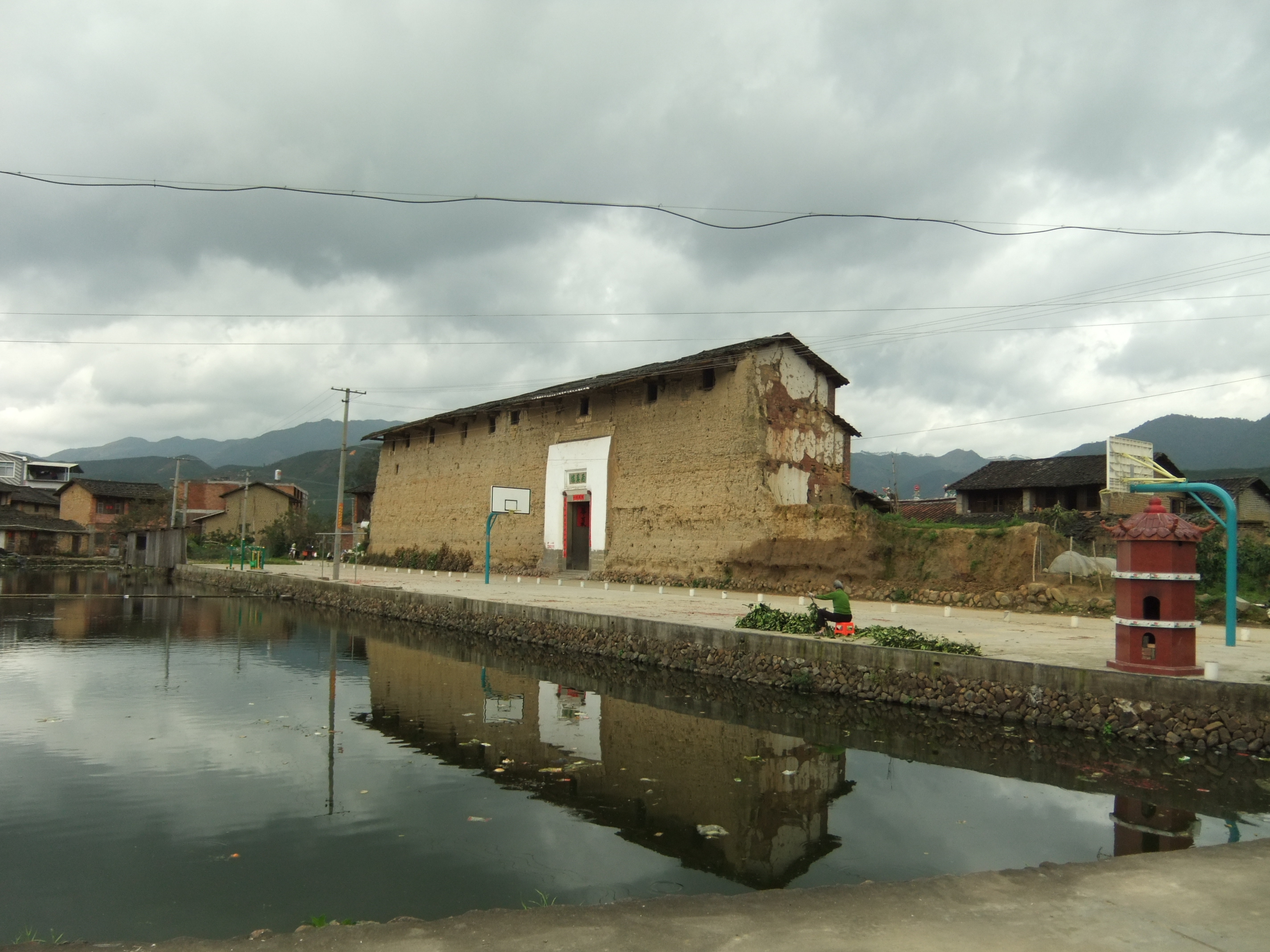
Surviving section of the front (southern) wall of Xishuang Lou

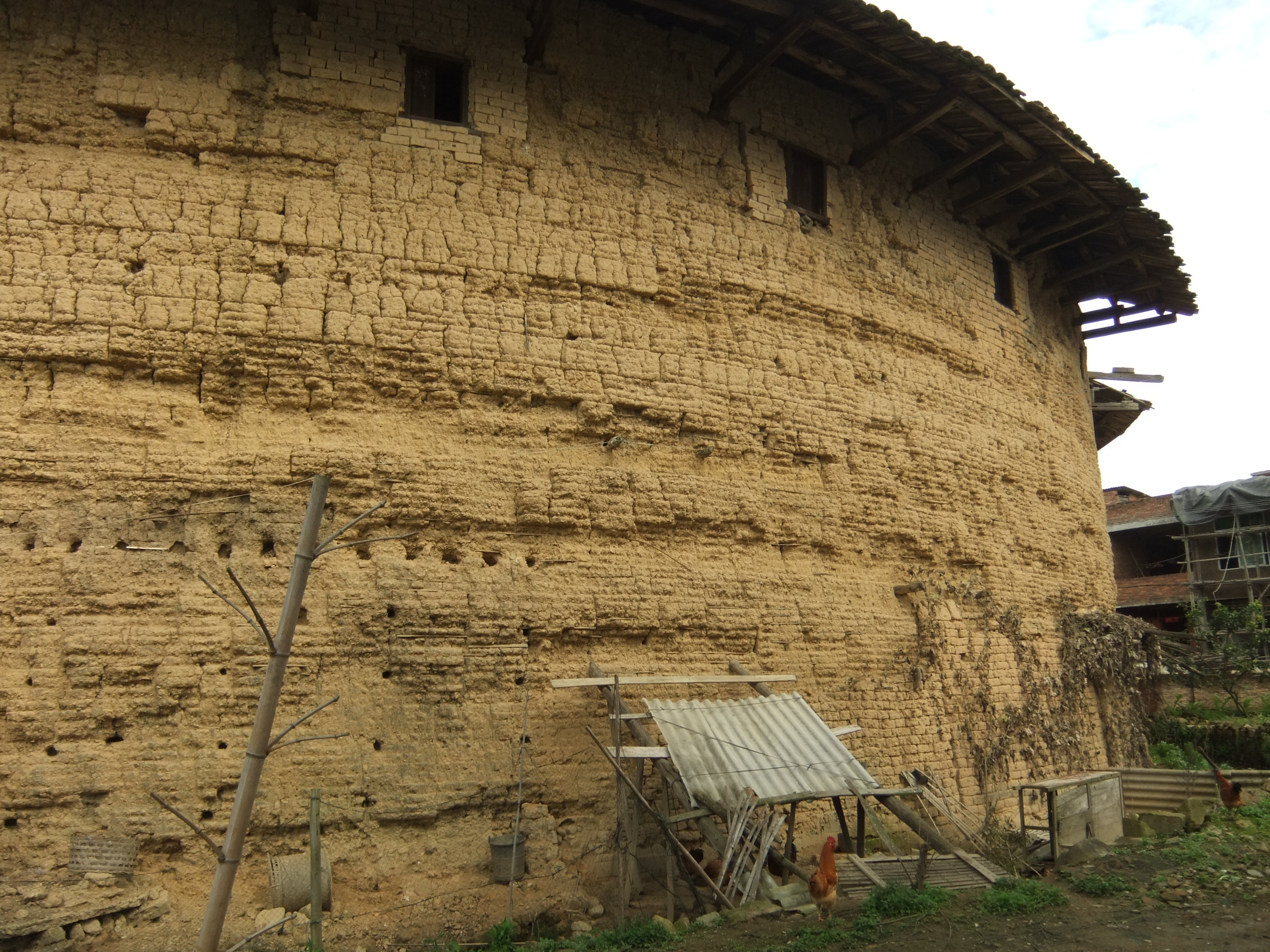
An old tulou in Xili natural Village

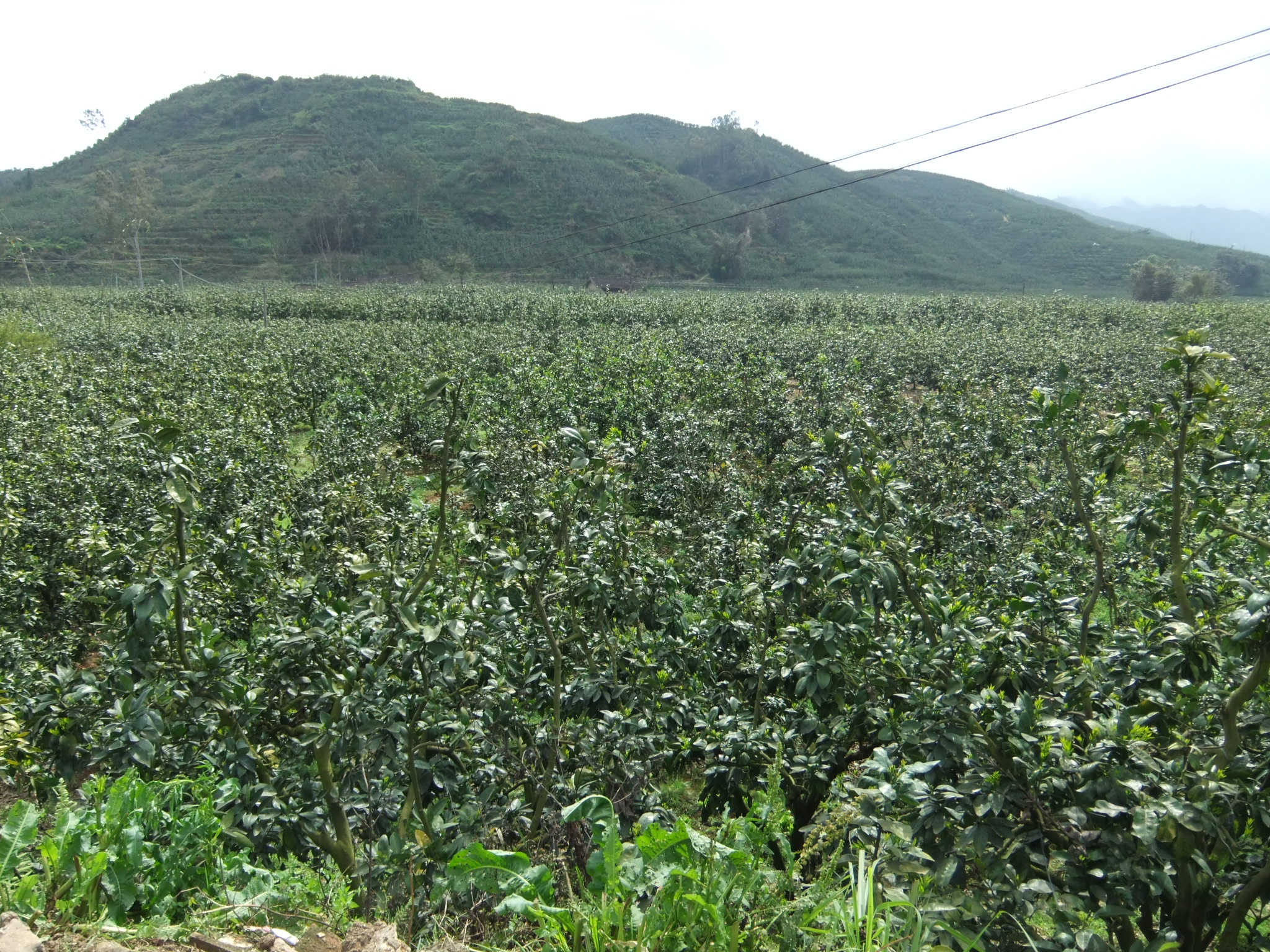
Pomelo orchards near Xi'an Village

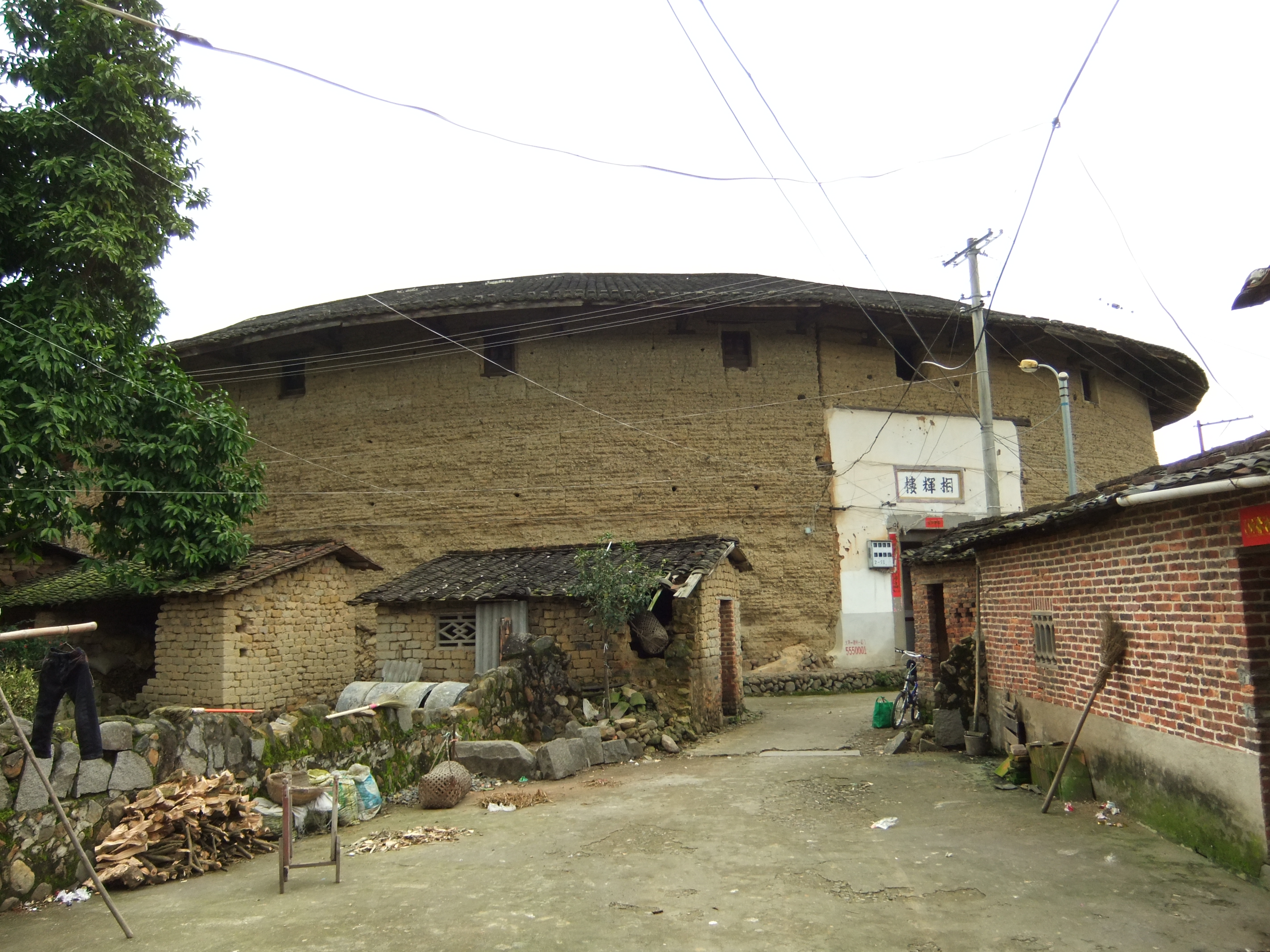
Xianghui Lou, Xinhui natural Village, Tuanjie administrative Village

== See also ==
- List of township-level divisions of Fujian
