= Matthew Broderick =

American actor (born 1962)

- Broderick in 2026
- Born: March 21, 1962 (age 64); New York City, U.S.
- Occupation: Actor
- Years active: 1981–present
- Spouse: Sarah Jessica Parker (m. 1997)
- Children: 3
- Parents: James Broderick; Patricia Broderick
- Relatives: Milton H. Biow (grandfather)

Matthew Broderick (born March 21, 1962) is an American actor. Known for his roles on stage and screen, he has received two Tony Awards as well as nominations for two Primetime Emmy Awards, a Grammy Award, a Golden Globe Award, and a Screen Actors Guild Award. Broderick was inducted into the Hollywood Walk of Fame with a motion pictures star in 2006 and the American Theater Hall of Fame in 2017.

Broderick took early roles in WarGames (1983) and Ladyhawke (1985) before playing the title role in Ferris Bueller's Day Off (1986) for which he was nominated for a Golden Globe Award. He then acted in Project X (1987), Biloxi Blues (1988), Torch Song Trilogy (1988), Glory (1989), The Freshman (1990), The Cable Guy (1996), Election (1999), Inspector Gadget (1999), You Can Count on Me (2000), The Producers (2005), Deck the Halls (2006), and Tower Heist (2011). He also directed himself in Infinity (1996) and voiced Simba in The Lion King (1994) and Adam in Bee Movie (2007).

On stage, he has won two Tony Awards, the first for Best Featured Actor in a Play for the Neil Simon play Brighton Beach Memoirs (1983) and the second for Best Actor in a Musical for the musical comedy How to Succeed in Business Without Really Trying (1995). He starred alongside Nathan Lane in the musical comedy The Producers (2001), the revival The Odd Couple (2005), and the showbiz comedy It's Only a Play (2014). He starred in the Broadway musical Nice Work If You Can Get It (2013) which was nominated for the Grammy Award for Best Musical Theater Album.

On television, Broderick has guest starred in 30 Rock, Louie, Modern Family, The Conners, Better Things, and Only Murders in the Building, the latter of which earned him a nomination for the Primetime Emmy Award for Outstanding Guest Actor in a Comedy Series. He played Professor Harold Hill in the television film The Music Man (2003) and Richard Sackler in the Netflix miniseries Painkiller (2023).

== Early life and education ==
Matthew Broderick was born on March 21, 1962, in Manhattan, the only son of Patricia (née Biow), a playwright, actress, and painter, and James Broderick, an actor and World War II veteran. His mother was Ashkenazi Jewish, a descendant of emigrants from Germany and Poland. His father was a Catholic of Irish and English descent. He has two sisters. His maternal grandfather was advertising executive Milton H. Biow. Broderick attended grade school at City and Country School in Manhattan and high school at the private Walden School, also in Manhattan. He received acting training at HB Studio.

== Career ==
=== 1981–1989: Teenage film stardom ===
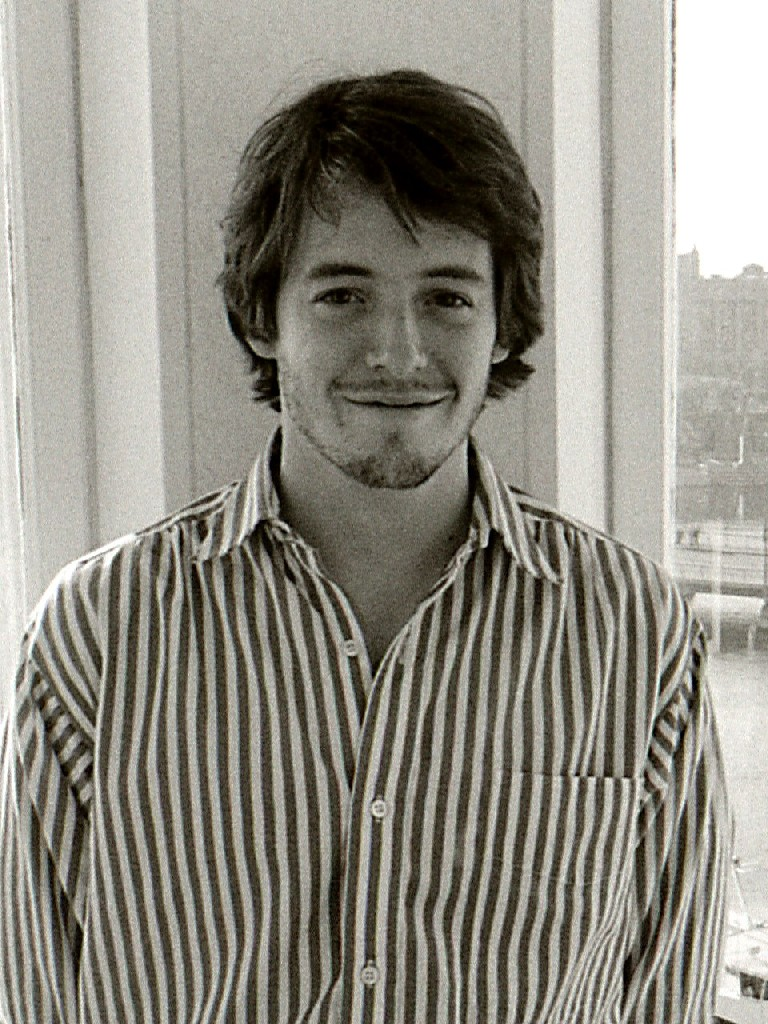
Broderick in Sweden during his promotion of Ferris Bueller's Day Off in 1986

Broderick's first major acting role came in an HB Studio workshop production of playwright Horton Foote's On Valentine's Day, playing opposite his father, a friend of Foote's. This was followed by a supporting role as Harvey Fierstein's gay adopted son, David, in the off-Broadway production of Fierstein's Torch Song Trilogy; then, a good review by The New York Times theater critic Mel Gussow brought him to the attention of Broadway. Broderick commented on the effects of that review in a 2004 60 Minutes II interview:

Before I knew it, I was like this guy in a hot play. And suddenly, all these doors opened. And it's only because Mel Gussow happened to come by right before it closed and happened to like it. It's just amazing. All these things have to line up that are out of your control.

He was replaced on Torch Song by Jon Cryer, who "closely resembled" Broderick. He followed that with the role of Eugene Morris Jerome in the Neil Simon Eugene Trilogy including the plays Brighton Beach Memoirs and Biloxi Blues. He won the Tony Award for Best Featured Actor in a Play for his role in Brighton Beach Memoirs. Broderick is a founding member of Naked Angels. Cryer also became a standby and replacement for Broderick on this role. As of 2024, he remains the youngest winner of the Tony Award for Best Featured Actor in a Play. Broderick's first film role as Michael McPhee in 1983's Max Dugan Returns was also written by Neil Simon, but his first big hit film was WarGames, a summer hit in 1983, in which he played the main role of Seattle teen hacker David Lightman. Broderick next played Philippe Gaston in Ladyhawke, in 1985.

Broderick then won the role of the charming, clever slacker in the 1986 film Ferris Bueller's Day Off. At the age of 23, Broderick played the titular high school student who, with his girlfriend and best friend, plays hooky and explores Chicago. A 1980s comedy favorite, the film is one of Broderick's best-known roles (particularly with teenage audiences). Also in 1987, he played Air Force research assistant Jimmy Garrett in Project X. In 1988, Broderick played Harvey Fierstein's ill-fated lover, Alan, in the screen adaptation of Torch Song Trilogy. He starred in the 1989 film Glory alongside Cary Elwes, Morgan Freeman, and Denzel Washington, and received favorable reviews for his portrayal of the American Civil War officer Robert Gould Shaw, whom Broderick physically resembled.

=== 1990–2011: Film roles and The Producers ===
In the 1990s, Broderick appeared as Clark Kellogg in The Freshman in 1990, was the voice of adult Simba in Disney's 1994 animated film The Lion King, and voiced Tack the Cobbler in 1995's Arabian Knight, Miramax's version of The Thief and the Cobbler in which the lead character was originally intended to be mute by Richard Williams. He won recognition for two dark comedy roles: bachelor Steven Kovacs in 1996's The Cable Guy with Jim Carrey, and a high school teacher in Alexander Payne's 1999 film Election with Reese Witherspoon. He also played Dr. Niko Tatopoulos in 1998's Godzilla, and the title character in Disney's Inspector Gadget in 1999. Broderick returned to Broadway as a musical star in the 1990s, winning a Tony Award for his performance in How to Succeed in Business Without Really Trying. Broderick then starred alongside Nathan Lane in the Mel Brooks 2001 stage version of The Producers which was a critical and financial success. He played Leopold "Leo" Bloom, an accountant who co-produces a musical designed to fail that turns out to be successful. Broderick was nominated for another Tony Award but lost to his co-star Nathan Lane. The musical went on to win the most Tony Awards in history with 12 wins. Broderick and Lane reprised their roles in the 2005 film adaptation of the same name.

Broderick starred in a 2004 off-Broadway production of the award-winning Larry Shue play The Foreigner as the witty Charlie Baker. He was reunited with his co-star from The Lion King and The Producers, Nathan Lane, in The Odd Couple, which opened on Broadway in October 2005. He appeared on Broadway as a college professor in The Philanthropist, running April 10 through June 28, 2009. In the 2000s, Broderick starred as Brian in the 2000 drama You Can Count on Me, voiced Hubble in the 2003 film Good Boy!, starred with Nicole Kidman in the 2004 film The Stepford Wives (a remake of the 1975 film of the same name), starred opposite Danny DeVito in the 2006 Christmas comedy film Deck the Halls, was the voice of Adam Flayman in the 2007 animated comedy Bee Movie, and voiced Despereaux in 2008's The Tale of Despereaux. Broderick starred with Ben Stiller, Eddie Murphy and Alan Alda in the comedy Tower Heist in 2011.

=== 2012–present ===
He returned to the Broadway stage in spring 2012 to star in the musical Nice Work If You Can Get It, directed and choreographed by Kathleen Marshall. He notably starred in the 2015 Broadway adaptation of Sylvia, a play by A.R. Gurney directed by Daniel J. Sullivan. In 2018, it was announced that he was cast in the main role of Michael Burr in the Netflix comedy-drama series Daybreak. Broderick made his West End debut in The Starry Messenger in May 2019, co-starring with Elizabeth McGovern. In 2022, Broderick returned to Broadway in a revival of Plaza Suite where he starred alongside his wife Sarah Jessica Parker. In 2024, the production transferred to the Savoy Theatre, London.

In 2023, Broderick played Laird Becker in the comedy film No Hard Feelings, and appeared as himself in two episodes of the Hulu comedy series Only Murders in the Building. His performance in the latter earned him a nomination for the Primetime Emmy Award for Outstanding Guest Actor in a Comedy Series. On June 16, 2025, it was announced that Broderick would star as Tartuffe in a new production of Tartuffe alongside Bianca Del Rio, Francis Jue, and Amber Gray at the New York Theatre Workshop.

== Personal life ==
=== Family ===
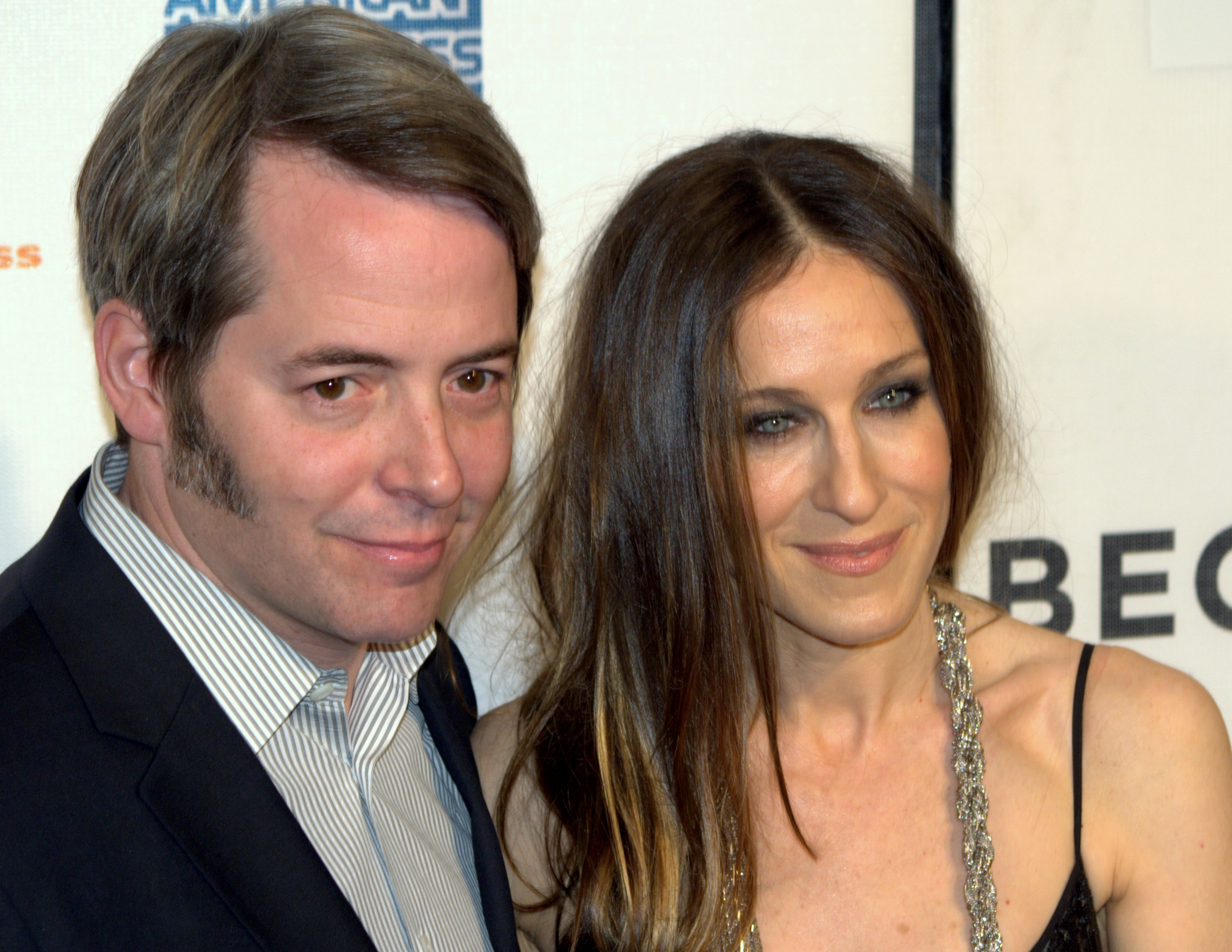
Broderick with wife Sarah Jessica Parker in 2009

Broderick and actress Sarah Jessica Parker married on May 19, 1997, in an Episcopal ceremony officiated by his sister, Rev. Janet Broderick Kraft.

Parker and Broderick have three children: a son, and twin daughters via surrogacy. Their son, James Wilkie Broderick, guest starred alongside Broderick in a season two episode of the CBS series Elsbeth.

Although the couple live in the West Village, they spend a large amount of time at their second home near Kilcar, a village in the south-west of County Donegal in Ulster, the northern province in Ireland; Broderick spent his summers in Kilcar when he was a child. They also have a house in The Hamptons.

Broderick holds liberal views.

=== Ancestry ===
In March 2010, Broderick was featured in the NBC program Who Do You Think You Are? He said his participation in the ancestry research program emotionally reconnected him with the role he played in Glory, as he discovered his paternal great-great-grandfather, Robert Martindale, was a Union soldier. A veteran of the Battle of Gettysburg, Martindale, who belonged to the 20th Connecticut, was killed in the aftermath of the Battle of Atlanta and interred in an unnamed grave at the Marietta National Cemetery. Having identified the grave with the help of historian Brad Quinlin, Broderick's research enabled him to give his ancestor his name back. In the same program, Broderick discovered that his paternal grandfather, James Joseph Broderick II, whom he had never known, was a highly decorated combat medic in World War I, having earned his distinctions during the Meuse–Argonne offensive.

=== 1987 car crash ===
On August 5, 1987, while driving a rented car at Garvary, a townland between Enniskillen and Tempo in County Fermanagh, Northern Ireland, Broderick crossed into the wrong lane and collided head-on with another car. The driver, Anna Gallagher, 28, and her mother, Margaret Doherty, 63, were both killed instantly. He was vacationing with Jennifer Grey, whom he had begun dating during the filming of Ferris Bueller's Day Off. He suffered a fractured leg and ribs, a concussion, and a collapsed lung. Grey's injuries included severe whiplash, which later required surgery to avoid paralysis. Broderick told the Royal Ulster Constabulary (RUC) that he had no recollection of the crash and did not know why he had been in the wrong lane: "What I first remember is waking up in the hospital, with a very strange feeling going on in my leg." He was charged with causing death by dangerous driving and faced up to five years in prison, but was convicted of the lesser charge of careless driving and fined £100 (US$175).

The victims' family called the verdict "a travesty of justice". The victims' brother/son, Martin Doherty, later forgave Broderick amid plans to meet him in 2003. In February 2012, when Broderick was featured in a multi-million-dollar Honda commercial that aired during the Super Bowl XLVI, Doherty said the meeting had still not taken place and that Broderick "wasn't the greatest choice of drivers, knowing his past".

== Acting credits ==
=== Film ===
Year	Title	Role	Notes
1983	Max Dugan Returns	Michael McPhee	
1983	WarGames	David Lightman	
1985	1918	Brother Vaughn	
1985	Ladyhawke	Philippe Gaston	
1986	Ferris Bueller's Day Off	Ferris Bueller	
1986	On Valentine's Day	Brother Vaughn	
1987	Project X	Jimmy Garrett	
1988	Biloxi Blues	Eugene Morris Jerome	
1988	Torch Song Trilogy	Alan Simon	
1988	She's Having a Baby	Ferris Bueller	Cameo
1989	Family Business	Adam McMullen	
1989	Glory	Col. Robert Gould Shaw	
1990	The Freshman	Clark Kellogg	
1992	Out on a Limb	Bill Campbell	
1993	The Night We Never Met	Sam Lester	
1994	The Lion King	Adult Simba	Voice
1994	Mrs. Parker and the Vicious Circle	Charles MacArthur	
1994	The Road to Wellville	William Lightbody	
1995	Arabian Knight	Tack the Cobbler / Narrator	Voice
1996	The Cable Guy	Steven M. Kovacs	
1996	Infinity	Richard Feynman	Also producer and director
1997	Addicted to Love	Sam	
1998	Godzilla	Dr. Niko "Nick" Tatopoulos	
1998	The Lion King II: Simba's Pride	Simba	Voice; direct-to-video
1998	Walking to the Waterline	Michael Woods	
1999	Election	Jim McAllister	
1999	Inspector Gadget	Officer John Brown / Inspector Gadget / Robo Gadget	
2000	You Can Count on Me	Brian Everett	
2003	Good Boy!	Hubble	Voice
2004	The Lion King 1½	Adult Simba	Voice; direct-to-video
2004	Marie and Bruce	Bruce	
2004	The Stepford Wives	Walter Kresby	
2004	The Last Shot	Steven Schats	
2005	The Producers	Leo Bloom	
2005	Strangers with Candy	Roger Beekman	
2006	Deck the Halls	Steve Finch	
2007	Then She Found Me	Ben Green	
2007	Bee Movie	Adam Flayman	Voice
2008	Diminished Capacity	Cooper Zerbs	
2008	Finding Amanda	Taylor Peters Mendon	
2008	The Tale of Despereaux	Despereaux	Voice
2010	Wonderful World	Ben Singer	
2011	Margaret	John Van Tassel	
2011	Tower Heist	Mr. Fitzhugh	
2011	New Year's Eve	Mr. Buellerton	Uncredited cameo
2013	Skum Rocks!	Himself	Documentary
2015	Dirty Weekend	Les Moore	
2015	Trainwreck	Himself	Cameo
2016	Manchester by the Sea	Jeffrey	
2016	The American Side	Borden Chase	
2016	Rules Don't Apply	Levar Mathis	
2018	To Dust	Albert	
2019	Wonder Park	Dad	Voice
2019	Love Is Blind	Murray	
2020	Lazy Susan	Doug	
2023	No Hard Feelings	Laird Becker	
2025	The Gettysburg Address	Narrator	Voice; documentary

=== Television ===
Year	Title	Role	Notes
1981	Lou Grant	Mike	Episode: "Generations"
1984	Master Harold...and the Boys	Hally Ballard	Television film
1985	Faerie Tale Theatre	Prince Henry	Episode: "Cinderella"
1988, 1998	Saturday Night Live	Himself (host)	2 episodes
1993	A Life in the Theatre	John	Television film
1995	Frasier	Mark	Voice; Episode: "She's the Boss"
1996	The West	William Swain	Voice; Episode: "Speck of the Future"
2003	The Music Man	Professor Harold Hill	Television film
2008–2012	30 Rock	Cooter Burger	2 episodes
2009	Cyberchase	Max	Voice; Episode: "Father's Day"
2010, 2015	Louie	Himself	2 episodes
2010	Beach Lane	Mike Brennan	Pilot
2012–2016	Adventure Time	Dream Warrior; Spirit of the Forest	Voice; Episodes: "Who Would Win" & "Flute Spell"
2012	Modern Family	Dave	Episode: "Mistery Date"
2013	Untitled Tad Quill Project	Jack Lewis	Pilot
2015	The Jim Gaffigan Show	Himself	Episode: "Wonderful"
2017	BoJack Horseman	Joseph Sugarman	Voice; 2 episodes
2017	A Christmas Story Live!	Narrator/Ralphie (adult)	Television special
2018–2019	The Conners	Peter	4 episodes
2019	At Home with Amy Sedaris	Cliff	Episode: "Teenagers"
2019	Saturday Night Live	Mike Pompeo	Episode: "Phoebe Waller-Bridge/Taylor Swift"
2019	Comedians in Cars Getting Coffee	Himself (guest)	Episode: "These People That Do This Stuff. They Stink"
2019	Daybreak	Michael Burr	10 episodes
2019	Rick and Morty	Talking Cat	Voice; episode "Claw and Hoarder: Special Ricktim's Morty"
2019	Better Things	Dr. David Miller	4 episodes
2023	Painkiller	Richard Sackler	Main role; 6 episodes
2023	Only Murders in the Building	Himself	2 episodes
2025	Elsbeth	Lawrence Grey	Episode: "Foiled Again"
2025	Fionna and Cake	Spirit of the Forest	Voice; 5 episodes

=== Theatre ===
Year	Title	Role	Theatre Venue	Ref.
1981	Torch Song Trilogy	David	Village Actors' Playhouse, off-Broadway	
1983	Brighton Beach Memoirs	Eugene Jerome	46th Street Theatre, Broadway	
1985	Biloxi Blues	Eugene Morris Jerome	Neil Simon Theatre, Broadway	
1986–1987	The Widow Claire	Horace Robedaux	Circle in the Square Theatre, off-Broadway	
1995	How to Succeed in Business Without Really Trying	J. Pierrepont Finch	Richard Rodgers Theatre, Broadway	
1998	The Pussycat and the Expert Plumber Who Was a Man	Tom Thomas	Signature Theatre, off-Broadway	
1999	Night Must Fall	Dan	Helen Hayes Theatre, Broadway	
2000	Taller Than a Dwarf	Howard Miller	Longacre Theatre, Broadway	
2001	The Producers	Leopold "Leo" Bloom	Cadillac Palace Theatre, Chicago	
2001–2002	The Producers	Leopold "Leo" Bloom	St. James Theatre, Broadway	
2002	Short Talks on the Universe	Lucifer	Longacre Theatre, Broadway	
2003–2004	The Producers	Leopold "Leo" Bloom	St. James Theatre, Broadway	
2004	The Foreigner	Charlie Baker	Laura Pels Theatre, off-Broadway	
2005	The Odd Couple	Felix Unger	Brooks Atkinson Theatre, Broadway	
2009	The Philanthropist	Phillip	American Airlines Theatre, Broadway	
2009	The Starry Messenger	Mark Williams	Theatre Row, off-Broadway	
2012–2013	Nice Work If You Can Get It	Jimmy Winter	Imperial Theatre, Broadway	
2014–2015	It's Only a Play	Peter Austin	Gerald Schoenfeld Theatre, Broadway	
2015	Sylvia	Greg	Cort Theatre, Broadway	
2016	Oh, Hello on Broadway	Guest	Lyceum Theatre, Broadway	
2016	Shining City	John	Irish Repertory Theatre, off-Broadway	
2017	Evening at the Talk House	Robert	Signature Theatre, Broadway	
2018	The Seafarer	Mr. Lockhart	Irish Repertory Theatre, off-Broadway	
2018	The Closet	Martin O'Reilly	Williamstown Theatre Festival, Massachusetts	
2018	Celebrity Autobiography	Performer	Marquis Theatre, off-Broadway	
2019	The Starry Messenger	Mark Williams	Wyndham's Theatre, West End, London	
2020	Plaza Suite	Sam Nash / Jesse Kiplinger / Roy Hubley	Colonial Theatre, Boston	
2022	Plaza Suite	Sam Nash / Jesse Kiplinger / Roy Hubley	Hudson Theatre, Broadway	
2023	Love Letters	Andrew Makepeace Ladd III	Irish Repertory Theatre, Off-Broadway	
2023	Babbitt	George F. Babbitt	La Jolla Playhouse	
2024–2025	Babbitt	George F. Babbitt	Sidney Harman Hall	
2024	Plaza Suite	Sam Nash / Jesse Kiplinger / Roy Hubley	Savoy Theatre, West End, London	
2025	Tartuffe	Tartuffe	New York Theatre Workshop, New York	
2026	Ulster American	Jay Conway	Irish Repertory Theatre, New York	

== Awards and nominations ==
Organizations	Year	Category	Work	Result	Ref.
Drama Desk Awards	1982	Best Featured Actor in a Play	Torch Song Trilogy	Nominated	
Drama Desk Awards	1983	Best Actor in a Play	Brighton Beach Memoirs	Nominated	
Drama Desk Awards	1995	Best Actor in a Musical	How to Succeed in Business Without Really Trying	Nominated	
Drama Desk Awards	2001	Best Actor in a Musical	The Producers	Nominated	
Golden Globe Award	1987	Best Actor - Motion Picture Musical or Comedy	Ferris Bueller's Day Off	Nominated	
Grammy Awards	2013	Best Musical Theater Album	Nice Work If You Can Get It	Nominated	
Outer Critics Circle	1982	Outstanding Debut Performance	Torch Song Trilogy	Nominated	
Outer Critics Circle	1995	Best Actor in a Musical	How to Succeed in Business Without Really Trying	Won	
Outer Critics Circle	2001	Best Actor in a Musical	The Producers	Nominated	
Primetime Emmy Awards	1994	Outstanding Supporting Actor - Limited Series or Movie	A Life in the Theatre	Nominated	
Primetime Emmy Awards	2024	Outstanding Guest Actor in a Comedy Series	Only Murders in the Building	Nominated	
Screen Actors Guild Award	2016	Outstanding Cast in a Motion Picture	Manchester by the Sea	Nominated	
Tony Awards	1983	Best Featured Actor in a Play	Brighton Beach Memoirs	Won	
Tony Awards	1995	Best Actor in a Musical	How to Succeed in Business Without Really Trying	Won	
Tony Awards	2001	Best Actor in a Musical	The Producers	Nominated	
Tribeca Film Festival	2018	Audience Award	To Dust	Won	
Hollywood Walk of Fame	2006	Star on the Walk of Fame	—N/a	Honoree	
