= Xiaoxi, Fujian =

Xiaoxi 小溪
- Town

Chinese transcription(s)
  - Chinese: 小溪镇
  - Pinyin: Xiǎoxī zhèn
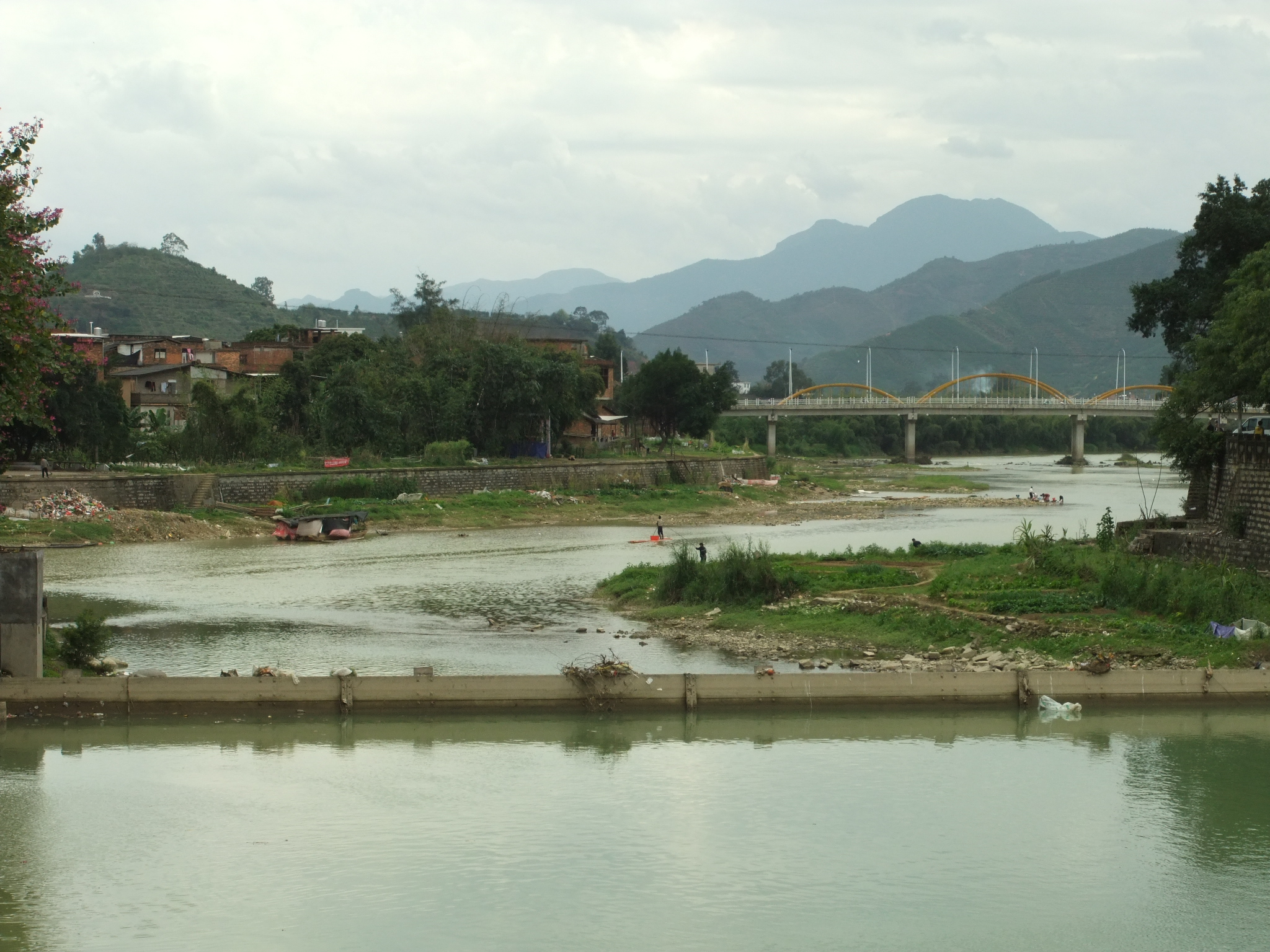
- Confluence of the Jinxi Creek and the Huashan River, seen from downtown Xiaoxi

- Location in Fujian Xiaoxi (China)
- Coordinates: 24°22′00″N 117°19′00″E
- Country: China
- Province: Fujian
- Prefecture: Zhangzhou
- County: Pinghe
- Time zone: UTC+8 (China Standard Time)

Xiaoxi (小溪) is the chief town of Pinghe County, in Zhangzhou, Fujian. It is the seat of Pinghe's government, Lower People's Court and local branches of CPC and PSB.

The town's name literally means "Little Stream"; the name most likely referring to the Jinxi (锦溪, "Brocade Stream"), which here finds its confluence with the Huashan River (花山溪), a tributary to the West Branch of the mighty Jiulong (or "Kowloon") River.
