= Ruby Lin discography =

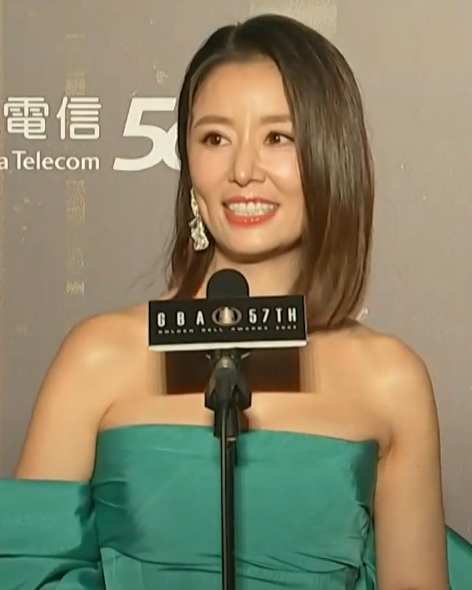
- Lin in October 2022
- Studio albums: 5
- Reissues: 1

In 1999, Ruby Lin entered the music industry with her first EP, "Hearings".

In 2001, Lin signed a contract with BMG Taiwan and released her second album, face 2 face (雙面林心如). A few days after its release, the Para Para Special Edition was also released. In 2004, BMG released the soundtrack for the television series Half Life Fate. in which Lin sang five songs.

At the end of November 2008, after a four-year break, Lin returned to music with her new album, New Rubyology (新如主義). Her album cut "Onion Soup" (洋蔥濃湯) led the China Music Song Chart (中国歌曲联) for three weeks. At the 12th M-Zone music awards, Lin won the Golden Melody and Entertainer of the Year awards.

== Albums ==
=== Studio albums ===
Title	Album details
Heartbeat (心跳)	Released: 1 October 1999; Languages: Mandarin, Cantonese; Label: Mei Ah; Genre: Single album
Double Faced Ruby Lin (雙面林心如)	Released: 14 March 2001; Language: Mandarin; Label: BMG (Hong Kong)
Eighteen Springs (半生缘新歌和精选)	Released: 1 April 2004; Language: Mandarin; Label: BMG (Hong Kong); TV drama OST
Possessing Ruby Lin (拥有林心如)	Released: 14 October 2004; Language: Mandarin; Label: BMG (Hong Kong); New + Best Selection
New Rubyology (新如主义)	Released: 29 November 2008; Language: Mandarin; Label: Feile Music (China), Skyhigh (Taiwan)

=== Reissues ===
Title	Album details
Pala Pala (趴啦趴啦)	Released: 16 March 2001; Label: BMG (Hong Kong); Formats: AVCD

=== Soundtracks ===
Title	Date released	Language	Tracks contributed
My Fair Princess OST (还珠格格音乐全记录)	13 June 1999	Mandarin	"You Are Wind, I Am Sand" (你是風兒我是沙); "In Dreams" (夢裡); "Butterfly Rain" (雨蝶)
Amor de Tarapaca OST (紫藤戀電視劇原)	25 June 2004	Mandarin	6. "At The Moment" (這一秒鐘)
Light The Night OST (華燈初上影集原聲帶)	1 January 2021	Mandarin	6. "Don't Love Me" (请别爱我)

== Other appearances ==
Besides studio albums and soundtracks, Ruby Lin sang a number of promo songs, TV or movie theme songs which didn't appear on any album or soundtrack.

Year	Song	Notes
2000	"Coca Cola And Joy" (with Nicolas Tse)	Theme song of Coca-Cola China TV commercial.
2005	"Sunrise waiting for the sunset" (日出等待日落)	Ending song of her 2005 television series Parisian Love Song.
2005	"Angel Don't cry" (天使别哭)	Theme song of her 2005 television series Parisian Love Song.
2005	"Stars aspiration" (星光心愿) (with Huang Yida)	Opening song of her 2005 television series Star Boulevard.
2005	"Taste" (滋味) (with Jordan Chan)	Theme song of her 2005 television series Star Boulevard.
2007	"Waiting" (等待)	Theme song of her 2007 television series Ancestral Temple.
2008	"We have love" (我们有爱)	Huayi Brother management company unit song for 5.12 China earthquake. With 30 more celebraties.
2008	"Best Gift" (最好的礼物)	Theme song of "Charity China for children"
2008	"The Song of Red Ribbon" (红丝带之歌)	Theme song of 2008 China World Aids Day. (1 December 2008)
2010	"Love can't stay away" (爱不能停)	Theme song of her 2010 film You Deserve To Be Single.
2010	"A Fallen Flower" (落花)	Theme song of her 2010 television series Beauty's Rival in Palace.
2011	"Qing Shi Huang Fei" (倾世皇妃)	Opening song of her 2011 television series The Glamorous Imperial Concubine.
2011	"Qing Ting Wo" (倾听我)	Ending song of her 2011 television series The Glamorous Imperial Concubine.
2016	"Landscapes in China are Beautiful" (山水中国美) (with Liu Tao and Gigi Leung)	Song for 2016 CCTV Spring Festival Gala.
2016	"Beauty and the Land" (红颜江山)	Ending song of her 2016 television series Singing All Along.

== Music videos ==
Year	Title	Album
1999	"HeartBeat"	Heartbeat
1999	"180 Minutes and 7 Seconds"	Heartbeat
1999	"Joke"	Heartbeat
1999	"Till Death Do Us Part"	Heartbeat
1999	"Harvesting Hearts"	Heartbeat
2001	"Falling into Your Arms"	Double Faced Ruby Lin
2001	"Dense Cloud Misty Rain"	Double Faced Ruby Lin
2001	"Overnight in Lan Kuai Fong"	Double Faced Ruby Lin
2001	"To Love Nobody"	Double Faced Ruby Lin
2001	"Can't Let Go"	Double Faced Ruby Lin
2001	"Hibernating Map"	Double Faced Ruby Lin
2001	"New Romance"	Double Faced Ruby Lin
2001	"Novel of Love"	Double Faced Ruby Lin
2001	"Every Type of Guy"	Double Faced Ruby Lin
2001	"The Way You Love Me"	Double Faced Ruby Lin
2001	"Pala Pala"	Pala Pala
2004	"18 Springs"	Half a Lifetime's New and Best Songs
2004	"Pass Each Other By"	Half a Lifetime's New and Best Songs
2004	"Love, Move a little Closer"	Half a Lifetime's New and Best Songs
2004	"Love One's Happiness"	Possessiing Ruby Lin
2008	"If only I hadn't seen"	New Rubyology
2008	"Onion Soup"	New Rubyology
2008	"Answer to the Riddle"	New Rubyology

== Awards ==
- 1999 Metro Radio Hits Music Awards New Singer Award
- 1999 RTHK Top 10 Gold Songs Awards for Best new female prospect award
- 1999 Jade Solid Gold Awards Presentation for Most Popular New Singer award (Bronze)
- 2001 MTV Music Awards for Best Music Video of the Year
- 2004 East Wind Music Award for Best Theme Song From TV Series
- 2008 12th M-Zone Music Awards – Golden Melody Song of the Year, All-round Artist
- 2009 (nominated) – Top Chinese Music Chart Award for Best Female Artist (Taiwan region)
