= Pala =

Pala may refer to:

== Places ==
- 1921 Pala, the asteroid Pala, a main-belt asteroid, the 1921st asteroid registered

=== Chad ===
- Pala, Chad, the capital of the region of Mayo-Kebbi Ouest
- Pala Airport, Mayo-Kebbi Ouest

=== Estonia ===
- Pala, Kose Parish, village in Kose Parish, Harju County
- Pala, Kuusalu Parish, village in Kuusalu Parish, Harju County
- Pala, Järva County, village in Türi Parish, Järva County
- Pala, Jõgeva County, village in Peipsiääre Parish, Jõgeva County
- Pala Parish, former rural municipality in Jõgeva County

=== India ===
- Pala, Kerala, a town in the state of Kerala
- Pala Assembly constituency, Kerala
- Pala dynasty (disambiguation), several historical ruling groups
  - Pala Empire, an imperial power originating in Bengal during the Late Classical period, 750–1161
- Pala Lake, English name for Palak Dil, a large lake in the state of Mizoram, Northeast India

=== Switzerland ===
- Pala Castle, San Vittore, Graubünden; a tower

=== Turkey ===
- Palā or Pala: a Bronze Age country in northern Anatolia,
  - where the extinct Palaic language (or Palaumnili), a part of the Indo-European language family, was spoken.

=== United States ===
- Pala Indian Reservation, San Luis Rey River Valley, San Diego County, California
- Pala, California, a small community in the Pala Indian Reservation within San Diego County
- Pala Casino Resort and Spa, a casino located in Pala, California
- Pala Road, San Diego County, California; a state road

=== Fictional locations ===
- Pala, a fictional island in Aldous Huxley's Island (Huxley novel)
- Pala, a fictional town in Far Cry 2, a video game

== People ==
- Pala (surname), a list of people with the name
- Pala. Karuppiah (born 1943 as Chinna Karuppiah), Indian politician
- Pala Narayanan Nair (1911–2008), Indian poet

== Groups, organizations ==
- Pala Hamburger, a Chinese fast-food chain
- Labor and Agrarian Party (PALA; Spanish: Partido Laborista Agrario), Panama; a political party
- Pan-American Lacrosse Association, international lacrosse organization for the Americas
- Pennsylvania Library Association, a professional association for librarians
- Poetics and Linguistics Association, an international academic association

== Arts, entertainment, media ==
- Pala (album), a 2011 album by Friendly Fires
  - "Pala" (song), a 2011 song by Friendly Fires, the title track off the eponymous album Pala (album)
- Pala (folk art), a folk-theatre form native to Odisha, India
- PALA (song), a 2025 song by Q_ARE

== Other ==
- Pala, a short kind of Turkish sword or kilij
- Presidential Active Lifestyle Award, part of the American President's Challenge

== See also ==
- Pal (disambiguation)
- Palai (disambiguation)
- Palas (disambiguation)
- Palla (disambiguation)
- Palan (disambiguation)
- Palar (disambiguation)
- Pallar, a caste of Tamil Nadu, India
- Pala Pala (Chinese: 趴啦趴拿, romanized: Para Para), 2001 album by Ruby Lin
  - "Pala Pala" (Chinese: 叭啦叭拿, romanized: Para Para, lit. 'PaLaPaNa'), 2001 song by Ruby Lin, the title track off the eponymous album Pala Pala
