= Paletta =

Paletta is a surname of Italian origin, a diminutive of Pala. There are many different spellings, including Palotta, Pallotta, Pallone, and Pallotti.

The first known usage of the name was in Rome, where the "Palloti di Roma" were located.

Families with variants of this surname are located in Rome, Piedmont, Milan, Scanno (Abruzzo), and Bologna.

== Notable people ==
- Damian Paletta, American journalist
- Gabriel Paletta, footballer
- Harry Paletta
- Joseph Paletta Jr., American fencer
- Juan Paletta, Argentinian footballer
