= Pallas =

Pallas may refer to:

== People, figures, characters ==
=== Mythology ===
- Pallas (mythology), several figures from Greek mythology, including:
  - Pallas (daughter of Triton), a nymph
  - Pallas (Giant), a son of Uranus and Gaia, killed and flayed by Athena
  - Pallas (son of Evander), a prominent character in the Aeneid
  - Pallas (son of Lycaon), a teacher of Athena
  - Pallas (son of Pandion), the father of the 50 Pallantides
  - Pallas (Titan), the son of Crius and Eurybia, brother of Astraeus and Perses, and husband of Styx
  - Pallas, an epithet of Athena

=== Persons ===
- Pallas (freedman) or Marcus Antonius Pallas, a freedman and favorite of Emperor Claudius
- Pallas, a secondary wife of Herod the Great; her origins and fate are unknown

==== People with the surname ====
- Albrecht Pallas (born 1980), German politician
- David Pallas (born 1980), Swiss footballer
- Ignacio Pallas (born 1983), Uruguayan football defender
- Janette Pallas
- Maria Pallas (born 1993), Estonian swimmer
- Paulí Pallàs (1862–1893), Spanish anarchist
- Peter Simon Pallas (1741–1811), German naturalist
- Simon Pallas (1694–1770), German physician
- Theodoros Pallas (1949–2025), Greek football player
- Tim Pallas (born 1960), former Australian politician

== Places ==
- Blue Ball, County Offaly, Ireland, a village once known as Pallas
- Pallas, a townland in Durrow, County Westmeath, Ireland

=== Astronomical ===
- 2 Pallas, an asteroid
  - Pallas family, a group of asteroids that includes 2 Pallas
- Pallas (crater), a crater on Earth's moon

== Transportation and vehicles ==
- Pallas, a series of luxury versions of the Citroën DS and other Citroën automobiles
  - Pallas, the designation of a Citroën DS car model.
- Pallas spacelaunch rocket family, from Galactic Energy
  - Pallas-1 launch rocket

=== Ships ===
- Pallas-class frigate, a 1791 class of frigates on the Royal Navy during the French Revolutionary and Napoleonic Wars
- Pallas-class frigate (1808), a class of 40-gun frigates of the French Navy during the Napoleonic Empire period
- MV Pallas (1939) or MV Empire Tulip, a Dutch coastal tanker
- MV Pallas, a 1971 cargo ship
- Pallas, a French Minerve-class submarine
- Pallas, a Russian barque, wrecked in 1895 after grounding on The Gwineas in the English Channel

== Groups, organizations ==
- PALLAS, a research group at University of California, Berkeley
- Pallas (band), a British rock band
- Pallas University of Applied Sciences, a university in Estonia
- Pallas, an Estonian art society which founded the Pallas Art School (1919–1940)
- Pallas Projects/Studios, a contemporary art space in Dublin, Ireland.

== Other uses ==
- Pallas, a 1993 novel by L. Neil Smith
- Pallas, a genus of moths in the family Hepialidae

== See also ==
- Hotel Pallas, a hotel in Muonio, Finland
- Pallas Athena or Athena, an ancient Greek goddess associated with wisdom, handicraft, and warfare
- Pallastunturi, a group of fells in Finland
- Pallas-Yllästunturi National Park, in Finland
- Pallasgreen, a village in County Tipperary, Ireland
- Pallas's cat, a species of small wild cat
- Pallas's fish eagle, endangered old-world, (Haliaeetus leucoryphus)
- Sailor Pallas, a character in Sailor Moon
- Pallas' reed bunting, a species of bird
- Palles, a surname
- Palas (disambiguation)
- Palla (disambiguation)
