= Palazzo (disambiguation) =

A palazzo is an Italian type of building. Palazzi are described as palaces or as any urban building built as a grand residence. Palazzo style architecture is an architectural style of the 19th and 20th centuries based upon the palazzi (palaces) built by wealthy families of the Italian Renaissance.

Palazzo may also refer to:

== Buildings ==
- The Palazzo, a AAA Five-Diamond resort in Las Vegas, operated by the Las Vegas Sands Corporation
- The Palazzo (Hong Kong), a private housing estate in Hong Kong

== Places of Italy ==
- Palazzo Adriano, a commune in the province of Palermo, in Sicily
- Palazzo Canavese, a commune in the province of Turin, in Piemonte
- Palazzo Pignano, a commune in the province of Cremona
- Palazzo San Gervasio, a commune in the province of Potenza, in Basilicata
- Palazzo (Assisi)

== People ==
- Giovanni Antonio Palazzo, 16th-17th century Italian writer
- Bruno Palazzo (born 2000), Argentine footballer
- Buddy Palazzo (born 1951), American football player
- Steven Palazzo (born 1970), U.S. Representative from Mississippi
- Brad Palazzo (born 1975), former gridiron football
- Loris Palazzo (born 1991), Italian footballer
- Sergio Palazzo (born 1962), Argentine politician and union leader

== Music ==
- "Palazzo" (song), a 2022 song by Spinall

== Characters ==
- Il Palazzo, fictional character
- Kefka Palazzo, main antagonist of Final Fantasy VI

== See also ==
- Palazzo Ducale
- Palazzo pants
- Palace
- Palace (disambiguation)
