= Palan =

Palan may refer to:

- Palan (film), a 2023 Indian Bengali-language film by Kaushik Ganguly
- Battle of Palan (1883), near Hanoi, during the Tonkin campaign
- Ronen Palan, British academic
- Palan-e Narges, a village in Iran
- Palan-e Olya, a village in Iran
- INS Palan, a boat of the Indian Navy

== See also ==
- Pala (disambiguation)
- Palana (disambiguation)
- Palar (disambiguation)
- Pallanguzhi, an Indian board game
- Pallar, a caste of Tamil Nadu, India
