= Paleta =

Paleta may refer to:

- Paleta (dessert), a Mexican ice pop
- Paleta (surname)
- Paleta Frontón, a Peruvian sport
- "Paleta" (song), by Ha*Ash
- Paleta is the term in Spanish for pork and lamb front leg cut, known as shoulder arm in some markets. Paleta de cerdo or Paletilla is the front leg equivalent of Jamón.

== See also ==
- Paletta, a surname
- Palette (disambiguation)
- Pelota, the name of several Spanish ball games
