= Palas (disambiguation) =

A palas is that part of a medieval imperial palace or castle which contains the great hall and other prestigious state rooms.

Palas may also refer to:

== Places ==
- Palas, Iran, a village in Iran
- Palas, a former commune, nowadays a neighbourhood in Constanța, Romania
- Palas, Turkey, a town in Turkey
- Las Palas, a town in Spain
- Palas, Kohistan, a valley in Pakistan

== Other ==
- Palas, a type of striped kilim, a flatwoven rug; also the woollen robes of dervishes
- Pálás cinema, in Galway, Ireland
- Pala dynasty (disambiguation)
  - Pala dynasty of South Asia
- Palas, a type of glutinous rice dish.
- Palas Power Station, Romania
- Palas Iași, a lifestyle center in Romania

== See also ==
- Pala (disambiguation)
- Palace (disambiguation)
- Palais (disambiguation)
- Pallas (disambiguation)
