= Grand Master's Palace =

Grand Master's Palace most often refers to:

- Palace of the Grand Master of the Knights of Rhodes, Greece
- Grandmaster's Palace, Valletta, Malta

Grand Master's Palace may also refer to:

- Magisterial Palace at Fort St. Angelo, Birgu, Malta
- Verdala Palace, Buskett, Malta
- San Anton Palace, Attard, Malta
- Grand Master's Summer Residence at Ġnien is-Sultan, Valletta, Malta (demolished)
- Palazzo Vilhena, Mdina, Malta
- Casa Leoni, Santa Venera, Malta

== See also ==
- Grand Palace (disambiguation)
- Palace (disambiguation)
