= Joe Darensbourg =

American jazz clarinetist and saxophonist (1906–1985)

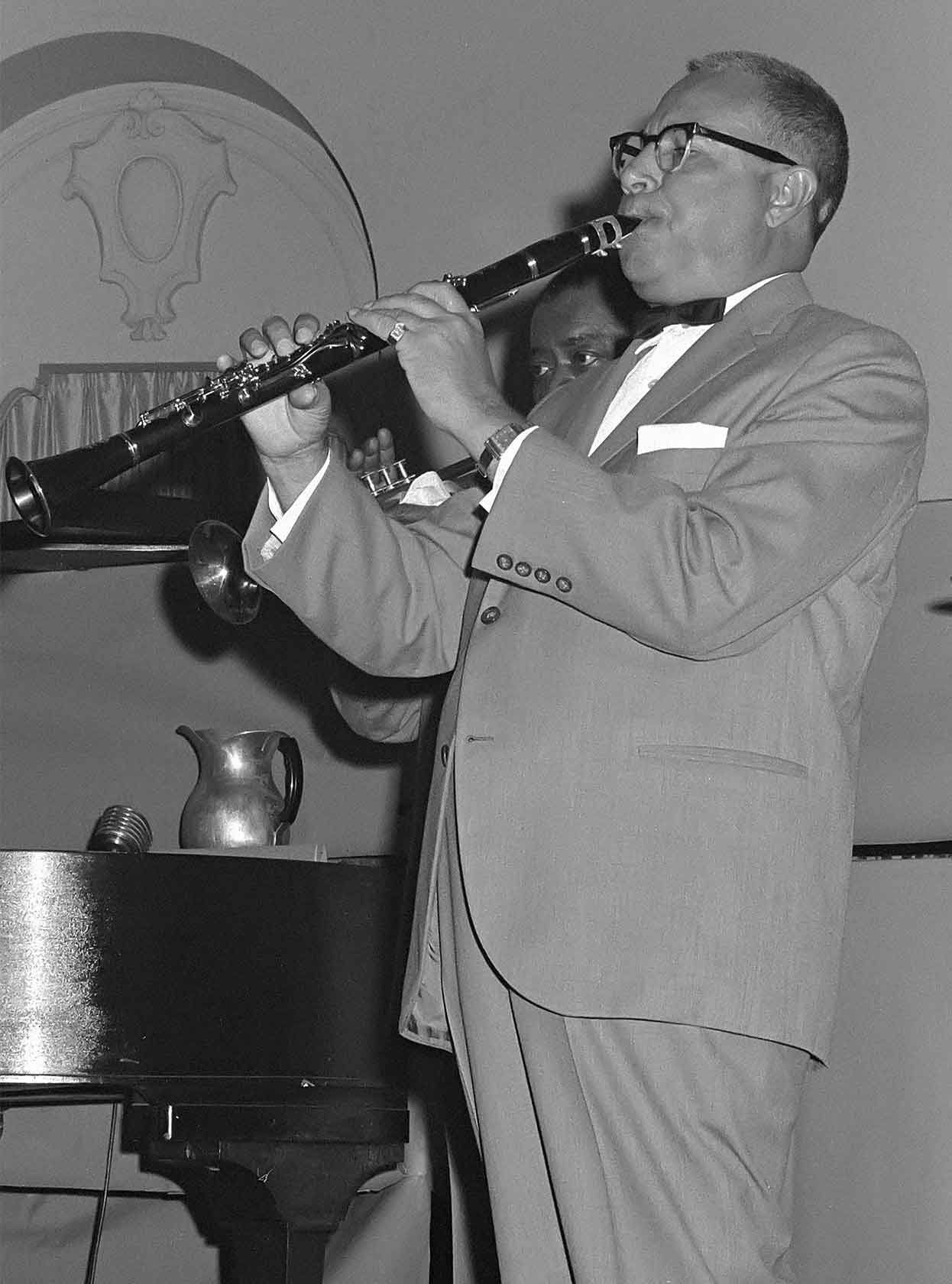
- Joe Darensbourg playing clarinet at the Palais Royal in South Bend, Indiana, 1963

Background information
- Born: Joe Darensbourg; July 9, 1906; Baton Rouge, Louisiana, U.S.
- Died: May 24, 1985 (aged 78) Van Nuys, California, U.S.
- Genres: Dixieland
- Occupation(s): Clarinetist; Saxophonist
- Instrument(s): Clarinet; Saxophone

Joe Darensbourg (July 9, 1906 – May 24, 1985) was an American, New Orleans–based jazz clarinetist and saxophonist, notable for his work with Buddy Petit, Jelly Roll Morton, Charlie Creath, Fate Marable, Andy Kirk, Kid Ory, Wingy Manone, Joe Liggins and Louis Armstrong.

== Discography ==
- "Yellow Dog Blues", Joe Darensbourg and his Dixie Flyers, Lark Records
- On a Lark in Dixieland
- "Louis Armstrong tour in Australia", including also vocalist Jewel Brown, is available on video
