= Impact Wrestling Prelude to Glory =

Prelude to Glory
- Promotional poster featuring various Impact wrestlers
- Promotion: Impact Wrestling
- Date: October 18, 2019
- City: South Bend, Indiana
- Venue: Palais Royale

Impact Plus Monthly Specials chronology
← Previous; Victory Road	Next → Turning Point

Prelude to Glory was a professional wrestling event produced by Impact Wrestling. The event was held on October 18, 2019, at the Palais Royale in South Bend, Indiana, and aired live on Impact Plus. It was one of two events taking place during the weekend of that year's Bound for Glory on October 20; a free, live event, "All Glory", was held on October 19 on Twitch.

Ten professional wrestling matches were contested at the event. The main event was a six-man tag team match, featuring Naomichi Marufuji, Rob Van Dam and Rhino against their respective Bound for Glory opponents The North (Ethan Page and Josh Alexander) and Michael Elgin. Other prominent matches on the card were a Street Fight between Eddie Edwards and Ace Austin, a six-woman tag team match pitting Jordynne Grace, Rosemary and Tenille Dashwood against Kiera Hogan, Madison Rayne and Taya Valkyrie and a tag team match pitting Brian Cage and Tessa Blanchard against Ohio Versus Everything (Jake Crist and Madman Fulton).

== Production ==
=== Background ===
On August 15, 2019, it was announced that Impact Wrestling would begin a partnership with a travel and media company Wrestling Travel, which would serve as the sponsor for the Impact Plus event Prelude to Glory, which would take place on October 18 at the Palais Royale in South Bend, Indiana.

=== Storylines ===
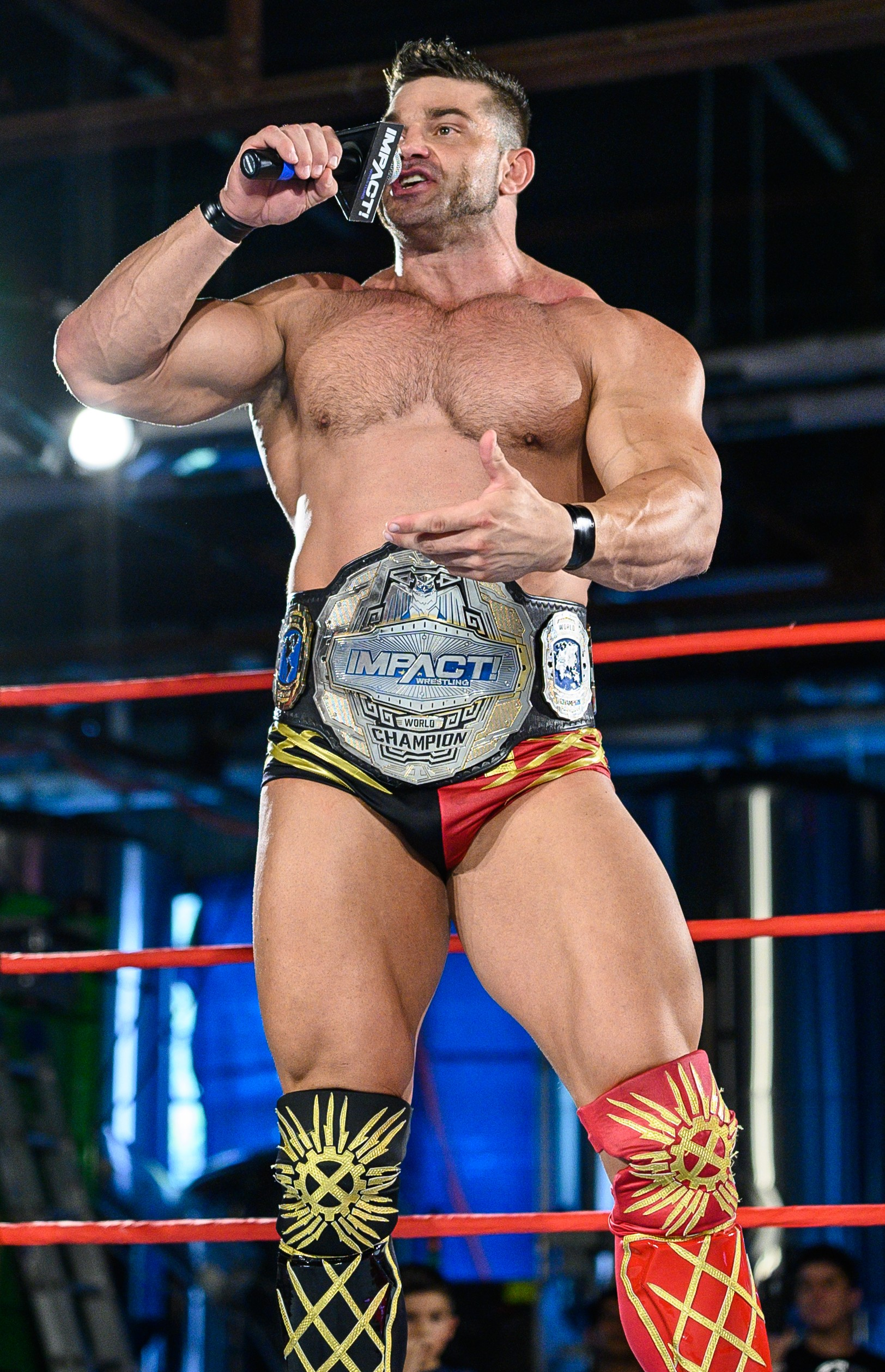
Brian Cage was the reigning World Champion heading into the event.

The event featured wrestlers from pre-existing scripted feuds and storylines. Wrestlers portrayed villains, heroes, or less distinguishable characters in the scripted events that built tension and culminated in a wrestling match or series of matches. Storylines were played out on Impact's weekly television show.

On September 22, the first match announced for Prelude to Glory was a six-woman tag team match, featuring the Knockouts Champion Taya Valkyrie, Madison Rayne and Kiera Hogan against Tenille Dashwood, Jordynne Grace and Rosemary.

On the July 26 episode of Impact!, Ace Austin began trying to impress and flirt with Eddie Edwards' wife Alisha Edwards which continued throughout the following two months and faked injury by walking through a wheelchair to arouse feelings of sympathy within Alisha and tried to create dissension between Eddie and Alisha. The rivalry further escalated when Eddie Edwards attacked Austin after his match on Impact! and was driven crazy with the feud which led to Edwards losing to Austin via disqualification in two matches. On September 30, it was announced that Edwards would face Austin in a street fight at Prelude to Glory. On the October 11 episode of Impact!, Austin defeated Edwards to qualify for a spot in the five-way ladder match for the X Division Championship at Bound for Glory.

A few more matches were added to the card stemming from matches scheduled for the Bound for Glory card.

== Event ==
=== Preliminary matches ===
The event kicked off with a tag team match pitting Rich Swann and Willie Mack against The Desi Hit Squad (Mahabali Shera and Rohit Raju). Swann nailed a Lethal Injection to Raju and then Swann and Mack nailed an electric chair, neckbreaker combination to Raju for the win.

Next, Fallah Bahh took on Johnny Swinger. Bahh nailed a Banzai Drop to Swinger for the win.

Next, two local wrestlers Russ Jones and Theo Storm competed in a match, which was quickly interrupted by Moose, who attacked Storm and took him out of the match and wrestled Jones in a match, which Moose quickly won by performing two Game Changers to Jones for the win.

Next, Havok took on local wrestler Elayna Black. Havok dominated the match with her power moves and hit a tombstone for the win.

In the following match, Sami Callihan took on Dez. Dez was about to perform a Final Flash on Callihan but Callihan shoved the referee into the ropes and executed a Cactus Special on Dez for the win.

After the match, Callihan insulted his Bound for Glory opponent Brian Cage and made personal remarks regarding Cage's wife Melissa Santos, which led to Cage attacking Callihan with a F5 and then his scheduled opponents and Callihan's oVe teammates Jake Crist and Madman Fulton attacked Cage until Tessa Blanchard made the save, leading to a tag team match pitting Cage and Blanchard against Crist and Fulton. Cage took out Fulton with a superplex and then Blanchard nailed a Magnum to Crist and Cage executed a Drill Claw on Crist for the win.

=== Main event matches ===
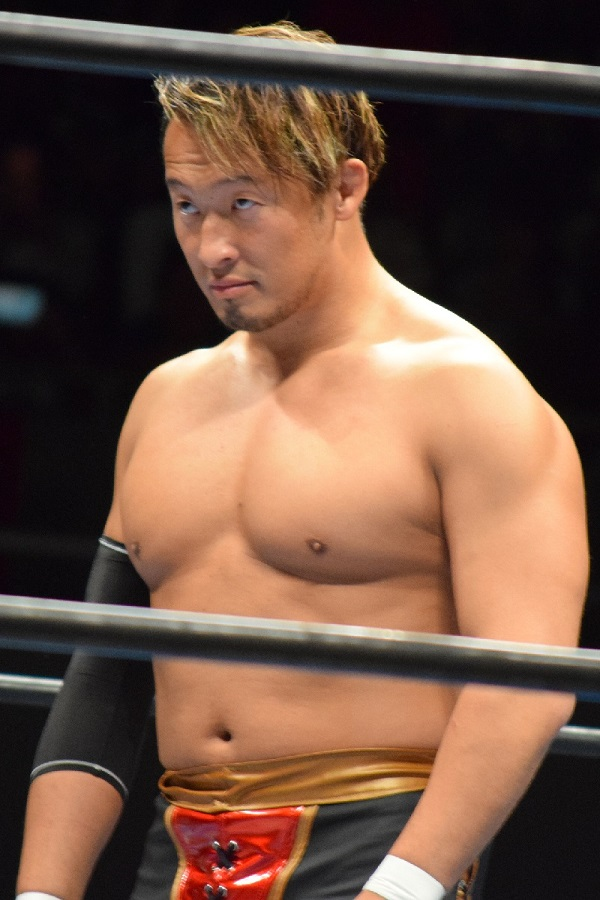
Naomichi Marufuji competed in the main event of Prelude to Glory.

Later, a six-woman tag team match took place pitting Kiera Hogan, Madison Rayne and Taya Valkyrie against Jordynne Grace, Rosemary and Tenille Dashwood. After Rayne accidentally attacked Valkyrie, Dashwood nailed a Spotlight to Valkyrie for the win.

The penultimate match of the event was a Street Fight between Eddie Edwards and Ace Austin. Edwards attacked Austin backstage before the match to begin the match. After brawling through the arena and the ringside, the match spilled to the ring. Edwards hit Austin repeatedly with the Kenny and then nailed a Boston Knee Party to Austin for the win.

The main event was a six-man tag team match pitting The North (Ethan Page and Josh Alexander) and Michael Elgin against their Bound for Glory opponents Naomichi Marufuji, Rhino and Rob Van Dam. Van Dam nailed a Five-Star Frog Splash on Page for the win.

== Reception ==
Larry Csonka of 411Mania rated the event 6, criticizing the first half of the show, "rather dire" having "nothing good in the ring" and criticized "production issues" citing that one "could constantly hear the producer talk over the show," "couldn’t hear backstage promos" and "the crowd was horribly mic’d". He also criticized the commentary saying that "(Scott) D’Amore & (Josh) Mathews seemed too concerned with amusing themselves throughout instead of adding to the show." However, he praised the second half of the event, which he considered to have "picked up and saved this show, making Impact Prelude to Glory 2019 a solid show that could have been better."

== Aftermath ==
Several matches from the event were prelude to the Bound for Glory pay-per-view, which took place two days later on October 20. Taya Valkyrie was able to retain the Knockouts Championship against Tenille Dashwood, The North successfully defended the World Tag Team Championship against the teams of Rob Van Dam and Rhino and Rich Swann and Willie Mack, Michael Elgin defeated Naomichi Marufuji, Jake Crist lost the X Division Championship to Ace Austin in a five-way ladder match and Brian Cage successfully defended the World Championship against Sami Callihan in the main event.

== Results ==
No.	Results	Stipulations	Times
1	Rich Swann and Willie Mack defeated The Desi Hit Squad (Mahabali Shera and Rohit Raju)	Tag team match	13:27
2	Fallah Bahh defeated Johnny Swinger	Singles match	06:19
3	Russ Jones vs. Theo Storm ended in a No Contest	Singles match	01:03
4	Moose defeated Russ Jones	Singles match	01:12
5	Havok defeated Elayna Black	Singles match	03:12
6	Sami Callihan defeated Dez	Singles match	13:53
7	Brian Cage and Tessa Blanchard defeated Ohio Versus Everything (Jake Crist and Madman Fulton)	Intergender tag team match	12:42
8	Jordynne Grace, Rosemary and Tenille Dashwood defeated Kiera Hogan, Madison Rayne and Taya Valkyrie (with John E. Bravo)	Six-woman tag team match	10:46
9	Eddie Edwards defeated Ace Austin	Street Fight	22:35
10	Naomichi Marufuji, Rhino and Rob Van Dam defeated The North (Ethan Page and Josh Alexander) and Michael Elgin	Six-man tag team match	11:46
