= Palai (disambiguation) =

Palai is a small town in Sri Lanka.

Palai may also refer to:

- Palai (Assembly constituency), of Kerala, in India
- Palai Central Bank, of Kerala, India
- Syro-Malabar Eparchy of Palai, Kerala, India — "Palai", an eparchy in the Syro-Malabar Catholic Church
- Palai, Malakand, Khyber Pakhtunkhwa, Pakistan

== See also ==
- Pala (disambiguation)
- Palais (disambiguation)
