= Pallone (disambiguation) =

Pallone is the name of several traditional ball games, played in all regions of Italy,

Pallone may also refer to:

- Pallone (surname), surname
- Pallone Azzurro, individual award assigned by the FIGC to the best Italian player
- Pallone d'Argento, annual award instituted by the Unione Stampa Sportiva Italiana, presented to Italian Serie A players
- Pallone di Cristallo, annual award given to the best player in Sanmarinese football
- Pallone di Gravina, firm, semi-hard, cow's milk cheese from Basilicata and Apulia, Italy

== See also ==
- Palla (disambiguation)
