= Palais Royal (disambiguation) =

Palais Royal is French for "Royal Palace", and can refer to the Palais-Royal, a former royal palace in Paris

Palais Royal may also refer to:

- Palais Royal (department store), a chain of department stores in the United States
- Palais Royal (Washington, D.C.), a department store operating from the 1870s-1940s
- Palais Royale, a dance hall in Toronto, Canada
- Palais Royale, Mumbai, a skyscraper in Mumbai, India
- Palaye Royale, a rock band
- Palais Royale Building, a historic commercial building in South Bend, Indiana
- Palais Royal!, a 2005 French comedy film, co-written, directed by and starring Valérie Lemercier.

== See also ==
- List of royal palaces
- Royal Palace (disambiguation)
- Palais (disambiguation)
- Royal (disambiguation)
