= Palais =

Palais (French pronunciation: [palɛ]) may refer to:

- Dance hall, popularly a palais de danse, in the 1950s and 1960s in the UK
- Palais, French for palace
  - Grand Palais, the Grand Palais des Champs-Elysées
  - Petit Palais, an art museum in Paris
- Palais River in the French département of Deux-Sèvres
- Palais Theatre, historic cinema ("picture palace") in Melbourne, Australia
- Richard Palais (1931–2026), American mathematician
- Le Palais, a commune in Morbihan departement, France

== See also ==
- Palais Royal (disambiguation)
- Palai (disambiguation)
- Palace (disambiguation)
- Palas (disambiguation)
