= Royal Palace Museum =

Royal Palace Museum may refer to:

- Royal Palace, Luang Prabang
- Royal Palace Museum (Porto-Novo)

== See also ==
- Royal Palace (disambiguation)
- Palace museum
