= Palar (disambiguation) =

The Palar River is a river in the Chikkaballapura district of Karnataka state in southern India.

Palar may also refer to:

- Palar River (Kaveri basin), a different river in India, in the states of Karnataka and Tamil Nadu
- Villages
  - Palar, India, a village in India in the Uttarkashi district of Uttarakhand state
  - Palar Nagar, a village in India in the Kolar district of Karnataka
- People
  - Pallar, a caste of Tamil Nadu, India
  - Lambertus Nicodemus Palar, an Indonesian diplomat
- Events
  - The Palar Challenge, an annual off-road motor race in southern India since 2006

== See also ==
- Palan (disambiguation)
- Pala (disambiguation)
- Palar blast, a landmine attack in Karnataka, India, that killed 22 people in April 1993
- Uttarkashi–Palar Yamunotri Railway, a proposed 22 km railway starting from Uttarkashi and ending at the village of Palar, India
