= Palace (disambiguation) =

A palace is a grand residence, usually for royalty or other high-ranking dignitaries.

Palace may also refer to:

== Places ==
- Palace (ward), a former electoral ward of Hammersmith and Fulham London Borough Council that existed from 1978 to 2002
- Palace, Missouri, a community in the United States
- Palace Site an archeological site in Des Moines, Iowa, U.S.

=== Buildings ===
- Buckingham Palace (sometimes referred to as "The Palace" to represent the British monarch
- Palace, Blackpool, a former British entertainment complex
- Palace (hotel), a grade classification of French hotels
- Palace II (building), a building that collapsed in Rio de Janeiro, Brazil
- The Palace (entertainment complex), a defunct entertainment complex in Victoria, Australia
- The Palace (Miami), a residential high-rise in Miami, Florida, U.S.
- The Palace of Auburn Hills, a defunct arena in suburban Detroit, Michigan, U.S.
- Avalon Hollywood, formerly known as The Palace, a nightclub in Hollywood, California, U.S.
- Grandmaster's Palace (Valletta), Malta, officially known as "The Palace"

== Arts, entertainment and media ==
=== Film and television ===
- The Palace (2011 film), a Cypriot–Australian short film by Anthony Maras
- The Palace (2013 film), a Chinese film
- The Palace (2023 film), a 2023 black comedy film written and directed by Roman Polanski
- Palace (TV series), a Chinese TV series
  - Palace II
- Palace, an alternative title for the South Korean TV series Princess Hours
- The Palace, a 2008 British television series about a fictional monarchy
- Palace Cinemas, a cinema chain in central Europe
- Palace Cinemas, a cinema chain in Australia

=== Literature ===
- The Palace, a 1970 novel by Wiesław Myśliwski

=== Music ===
- Palace (band), a British alternative rock band
- Palace (album), a 2011 album by Chapel Club
- Palaces (album), a 2022 album by Flume
- Palaces (Louis Tomlinson song), a 2025 song by Louis Tomlinson
- "Palace", a 2014 song by The Antlers from Familiars
- "Palace", a 2016 song by Hayley Kiyoko from Citrine
- "Palace", a 2017 song by Sam Smith from The Thrill of It All
- "Palace", a 2018 song by D-Crunch from 0806
- Will Oldham, an American musician, who recorded under several names, including "Palace", "Palace Music", and "Palace Brothers"

== Other uses ==
- Palace Entertainment, an American amusement and entertainment company
- The Palace (computer program), a chat room program launched in 1995
- Crystal Palace F.C., an English football club commonly referred to as "Palace"
- Palace (clothing shop), a popular British retailer of limited edition clothing items

== See also ==
- Palazzo (disambiguation)
- Palais (disambiguation)
- Palas (disambiguation)
- Ducal Palace
- Grand Palace (disambiguation)
- Royal Palace (disambiguation)
- Castle (disambiguation)
