= Palla (surname) =

Palla is a surname. Notable people with the surname include:

- Eduard Palla (1864–1922), Austrian botanist and mycologist of Moravian descent
- Maria Antónia Palla (born 1933), Portuguese journalist, writer and feminist
- Stephan Palla (born 1989), professional footballer

== See also ==
- Palla (disambiguation)
- Pala (surname)
