= Gulfport High School =

Coordinates: 30.388611171189027°N 89.04141827309677°W

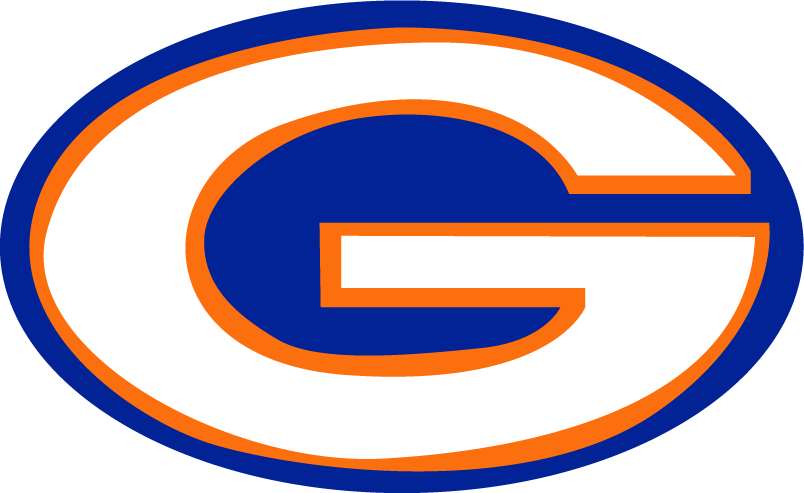

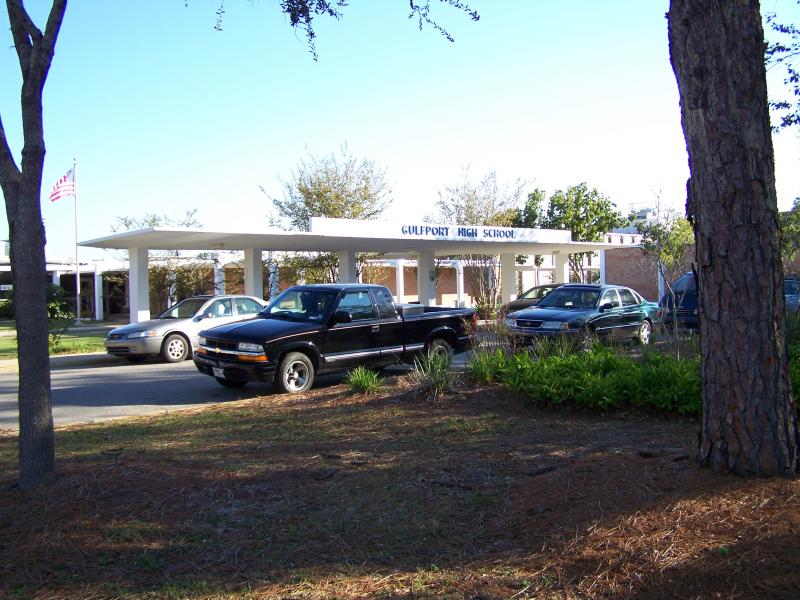

Location
- 100 Perry Street; Gulfport, Mississippi 39503; United States

Information
- School district: Gulfport School District
- Principal: Rachel Gibson
- Teaching staff: 102.69 (on an FTE basis)
- Enrollment: 1,742 (2023-2024)
- Student to teacher ratio: 16.96
- Colors: Royal Blue, orange and white
- Mascot: Admirals
- Yearbook: The Voyage
- Website: gulfport.high.gulfportschools.org/o/gulfporthigh

Gulfport High School (GHS) is a public high school located in Gulfport, Mississippi, United States. It is part of the Gulfport School District.

In 2019, Gulfport High was given a B-rating from the Mississippi Statewide Accountability System. The mascot is the Admiral. School colors are royal blue, orange, and white. The helmet insignia is a replica of the Green Bay Packers' "G."

== History ==
The original Gulfport High was built in the year 1923, and the current Gulfport High School was founded in 1967. In 1966, Gulfport East was built. The first classes occurred in 1967, which were fully integrated. In 1978, the two schools merged, forming the current campus. It is part of the Gulfport School District.

== Academics ==
In 2019, the school's body had an average ACT score of a 20.3, and it given a B-rating from the Mississippi Statewide Accountability system. Students at Gulfport High School have the option to take Advanced Placement classes and also have access to career readiness programs, known as the Academic Institutes. Dual Credit courses are also available to earn college credit. Gulfport High offers 3 different kinds of diplomas.

== Advanced Placement classes ==
Gulfport High School offers 19 AP classes: 2-D Art & Design, Art Studio, Biology, Calculus AB, Chemistry, Comparative Government & Politics, Drawing, English Language and Composition, English Literature and Composition, French, Macroeconomics, Music Theory, Physics, Spanish Language & Culture, Spanish Literature & Culture, Statistics, US Government & Politics, US History, and World History.

== Campus renovations ==
In 2014, planning was created for the school that featured specialized buildings known as Academic Institutes, which would require demolition of six buildings; funding for the project totaled to $41.2 million in bonds. The new school was scheduled to ready by fall of 2016. Phase One construction began in 2016 and Phase Two finished in late 2017, although the planned practice gym finished in 2018. Renovations included limiting the amount of entrances to increase safety, new classes, a state-of-the-art culinary arts department, new band halls, new buildings, a new theater, general school improvements, and the planned Academic Institutes; the goal, as stated by the GHS public information director MC Price, was for Gulfport High to resemble "a college campus." In total, the school renovated 200,000 square feet.

== Extracurricular activities ==
As of 2020, Gulfport High participates in the following athletics: baseball, basketball (boys), basketball (girls), bowling, cheerleading, cross country, 6A football, golf (boys), golf (girls), powerlifting, soccer (boys), soccer (girls), softball, swimming, tennis, track and field, and volleyball. The school's mascot is the Admirals and uses the colors royal blue, orange, and white. The helmet insignia a replica of the Green Bay Packers' "G."

GHS has a marching band, choir, orchestra, and Marine Corps JROTC program. It hosts the following clubs: Anime, Art, Beta, Debate, DECA, Environmental, FCA, Educators Rising, French, HOSA, Interact, International Thespian Society, Key, Mu Alpha Theta, NHS, NTHS, Junior Quota, Skills USA, National Hispanic Honor Society, Spanish, Student Council, FIRST Robotics team (Team Fusion), Youth Legislation, BCM (Admiral theater), Annual Staff, Junior Civitan, BASS Fishing, Quiz Bowl, Creative Writing, Drama, Culinary Arts, and SDEGI (Students Engage Global Issues).

== Notable alumni ==
Name	Class year	Notability	Reference(s)
Jaimoe	1960	Graduate of Gulfport's 33rd St. high school before desegregation	
Hal Malchow	1969	Political consultant, author, and lawyer	
Buddy Palazzo	1969	Former professional football quarterback	
Milton Barney	1983	Former professional football wide receiver	
Mahmoud Abdul-Rauf	1988	Former professional basketball player	
Stacey Abrams	1991	Gubernatorial candidate in Georgia in 2018 and 2022; moved to GA in 1989 after 10th grade	
Matt Luke	1994	Former football player and former head coach for the University of Mississippi football team.	
Rod Davis	1999	Former professional football linebacker	
Ronald Jones	2000	Former professional football offensive and defensive lineman	
Brittney Reese	2004	Olympic gold medalist in long jump, 7-time world champion	
Jonathan Holder	2012	MLB pitcher	
Derick Hall	2019	NFL outside linebacker for the Seattle Seahawks	
