= Fly-whisk =

Type of hand fan, often ceremonial, notably made of feathers or animal tail hairs

16th century Chinese fly whisk

A fly-whisk (or fly-swish) is a tool that is used to swat flies. A similar device is used as a hand fan in hot tropical climates, sometimes as part of regalia, and is called a chowrie, chāmara, or prakirnaka in South Asia and Tibet.

== Symbolic use ==
A fly-whisk is frequently seen as an attribute of Hindu, Jain, Daoist and Buddhist deities. The fly-whisk is evident in some configurations of the Ashtamangala, employed in some traditions of murti puja, particularly Gaudiya Vaishnavism. It is also used as an accessory in the ritual aspects of folk performance traditions, especially folk-theater forms like Pala, where it can double as a prop. The Hindu deity Shiva, for example, has been portrayed with a fly-whisk in Indonesian art.

The fly whisk is used to fan the Sikh scripture the Guru Granth Sahib in gurdwaras.

Fly-whisks appear frequently in the traditional regales of monarchs and nobility in many parts of the African continent. Fly whisks, called "ìrùkẹ̀rẹ̀" in Yoruba, were used by Yoruba monarchs and chiefs as a symbol of power and respect. This use has sometimes carried on into modern contexts: Kenyan leader Jomo Kenyatta carried a fly-whisk, a mark of authority in Maasai society, as did Malawian leader Hastings Banda, while South African jazz musician Jabu Khanyile also used a Maasai fly-whisk as a trademark when on stage. The fly-whisk is one of the traditional symbols of Taoist and Buddhist monastic hierarchy in China and Japan, along with the khakkhara, jewel scepter, and begging bowl. The fly-whisk in Buddhism represents the symbolic "sweeping" of ignorance and mental afflictions. The Daoist fly-whisk is made of the root and twine of the smilax for the handle, and the hairs are made of palm fiber. The Chinese fly-whisk is also used in many Chinese martial arts such as Shaolin Kung Fu and Wudang quan, each corresponding to their own respective religious philosophy.

A fly-whisk forms part of the royal regalia of Thailand. It consists of the tail hairs of a white elephant. Fly-whisks were also used in Polynesian culture as a ceremonial mark of authority.

== Algeria incident ==
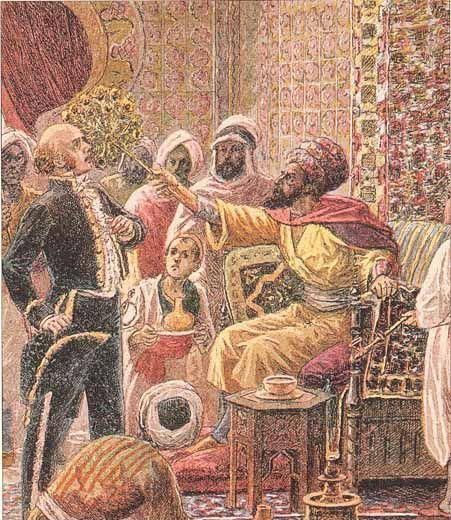
The "Fan Affair" of 1827 which was the pretext for the French invasion of Algeria

In 1827, the last Ottoman ruler of Algeria, Hussein Dey, struck the French consul, Pierre Deval in the face with a fly-whisk during a dispute over unpaid French debts to Algeria. That insult became a pretext for the French invasion of Algeria in 1830.

== Gallery ==
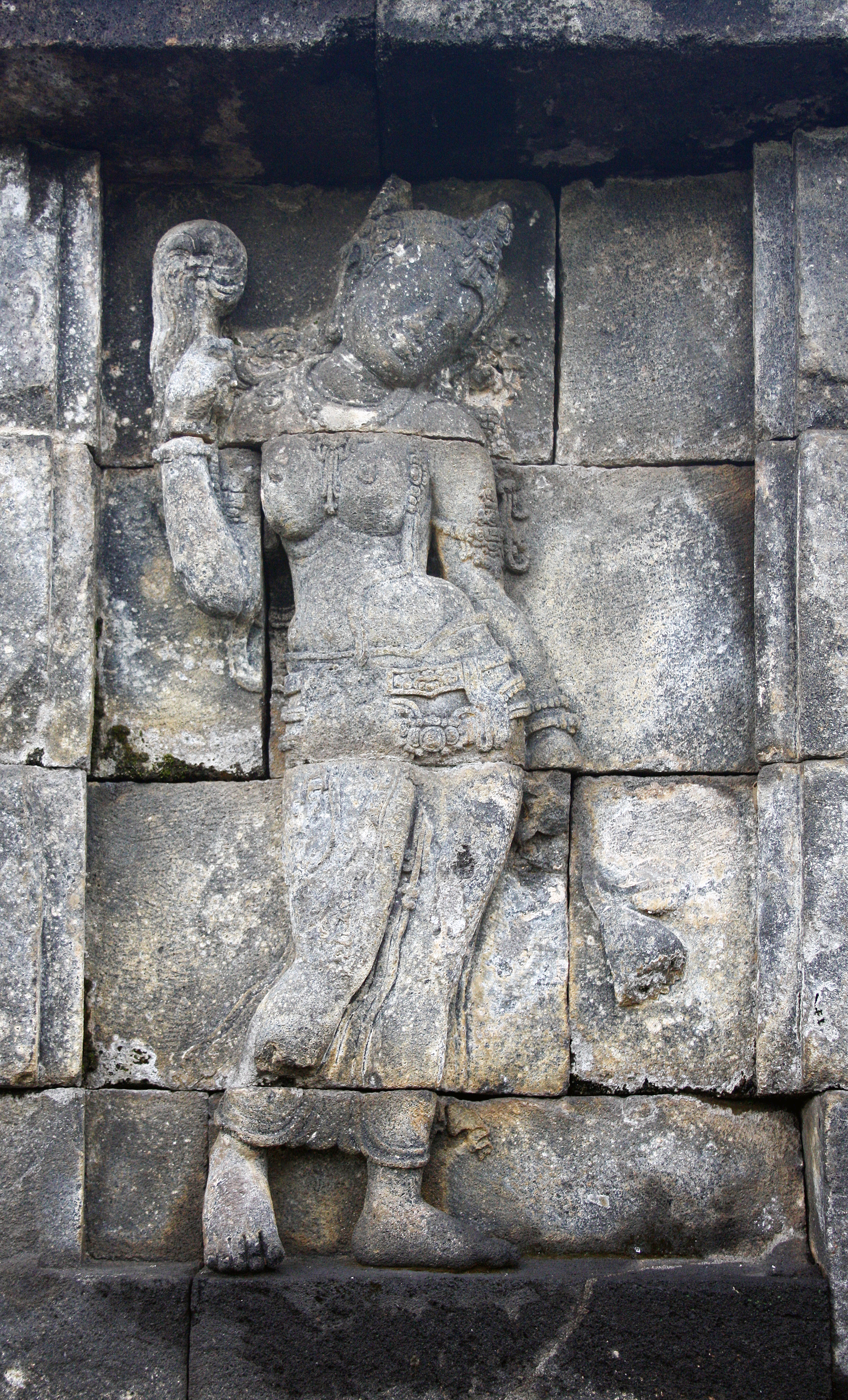
Chamara (fly-whisk) as regalia in Hindu-Buddhist iconography. 8th century Borobudur bas-relief.

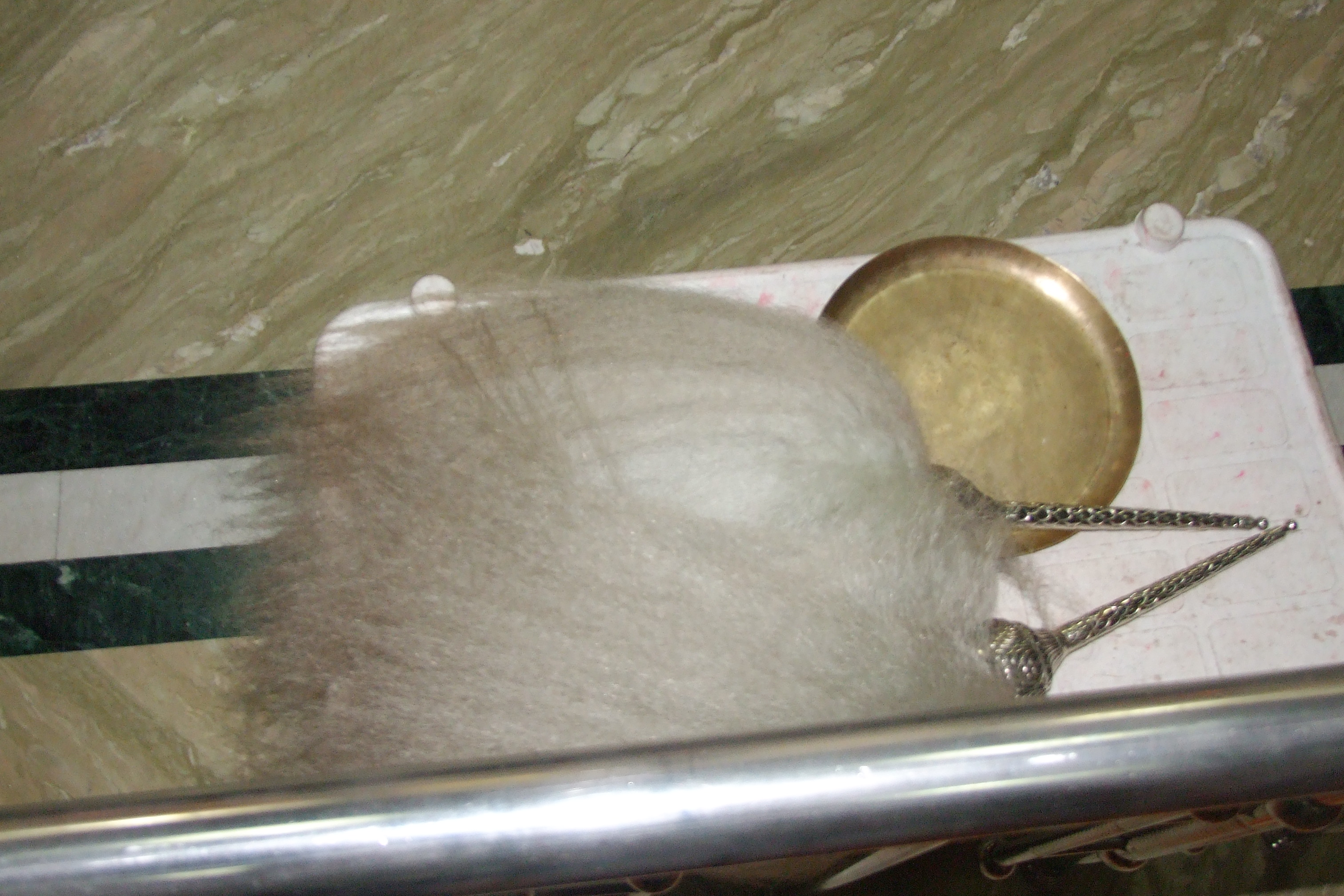
Chamara used in Hindu puja (prayer rituals)

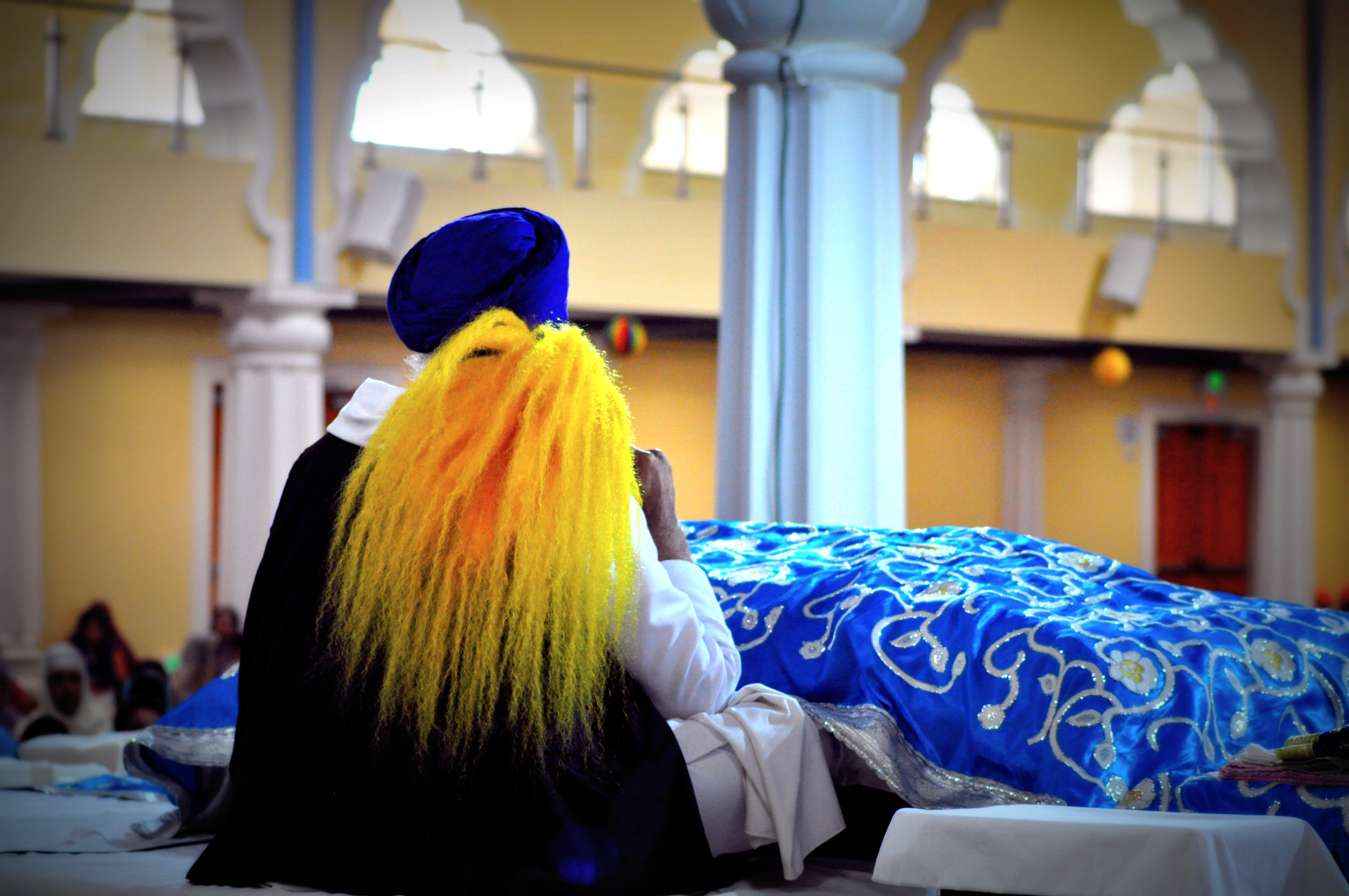
Orange-colored chauri used to fan Sikh scripture in respect

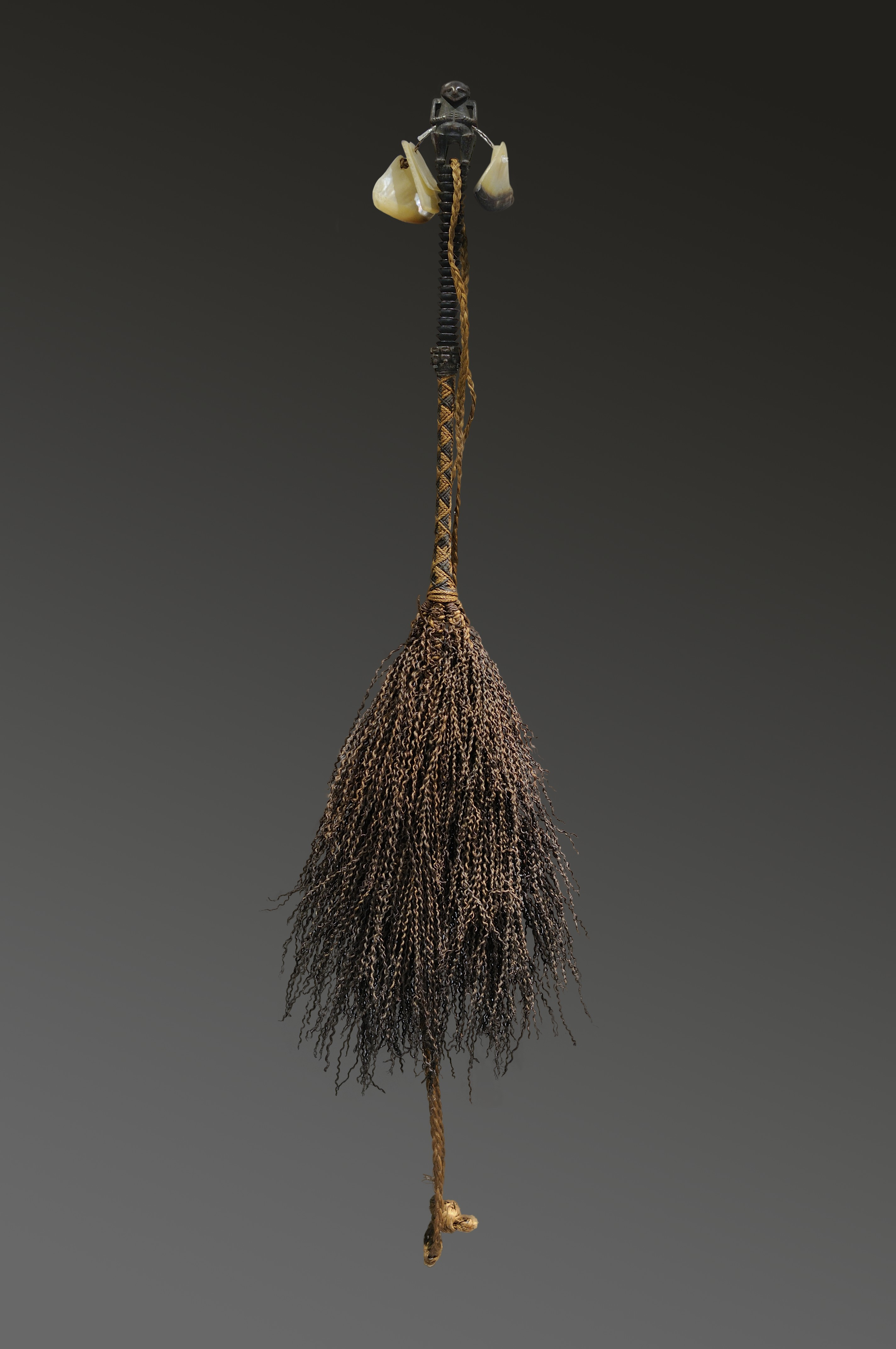
Polynesian chasse-mouches

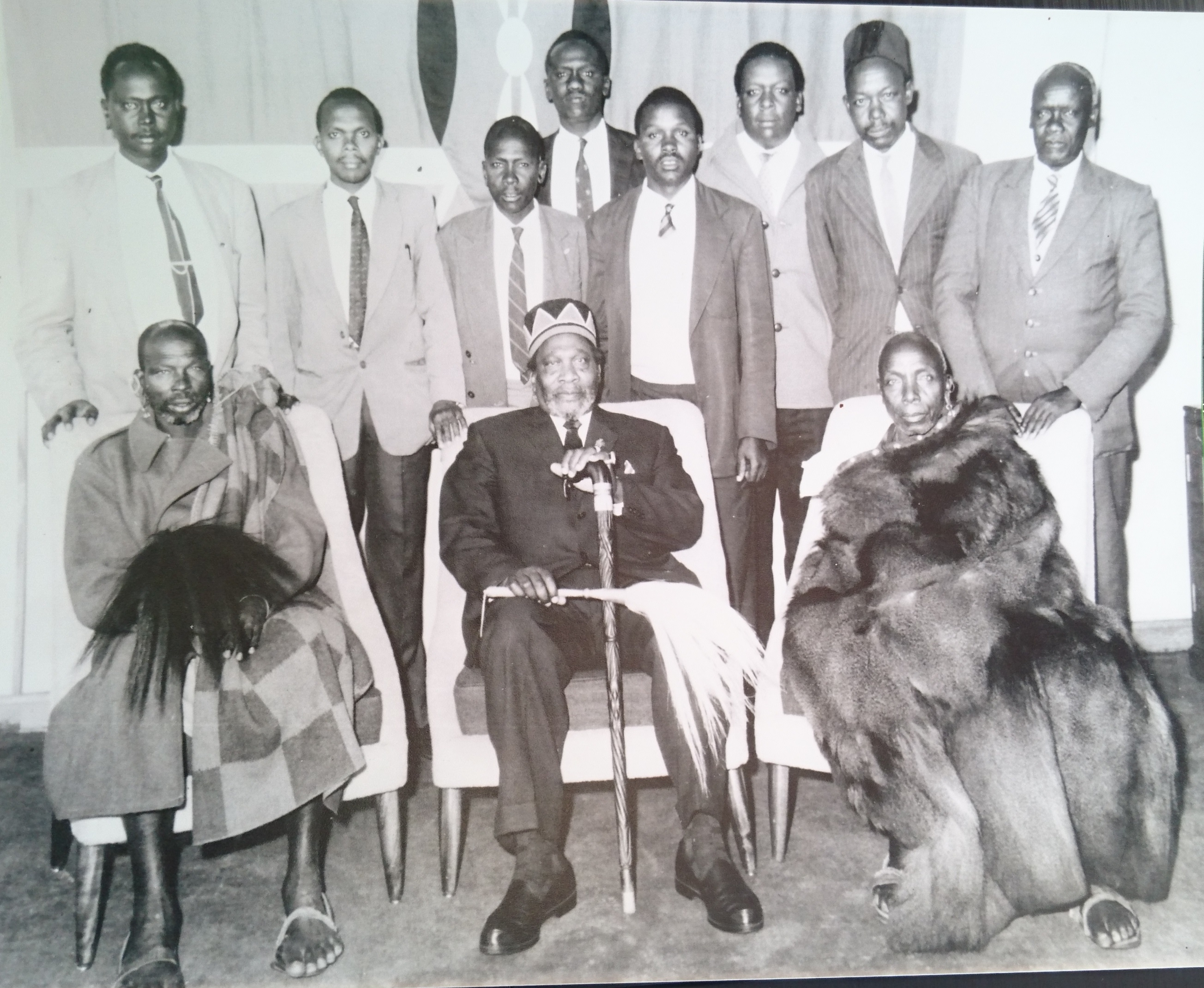
President Jomo Kenyatta seated center with his fly whisk

== See also ==
- Hossu: for Buddhist priests
- Flyswatter
- Feather duster
- Whisk
