= Palles =

Palles is a surname. Notable people with this surname include:

- Anne Palles (1619–1693), alleged Danish witch
- Christopher Palles (1831–1920), Irish barrister and judge

== See also ==
- Pallas
