= Grand Palace (disambiguation) =

The Grand Palace is a palace complex in Bangkok, Thailand.

Grand Palace may also refer to:

- Grand Palace Hotel, Riga, Latvia
- Grand Palace at Peterhof Palace, Saint Petersburg, Russia
- Great Palace of Constantinople, Old Istanbul, Turkey
- Grand Palace Hotel, New Orleans, U.S.

== See also ==
- Grand Central Palace, New York City, U.S.
- Grand Ducal Palace, Luxembourg
- Grand Kremlin Palace, Moscow, Russia
- Grand Master's Palace (disambiguation)
- Grand Palais or Grand Palais des Champs-Élysées, Paris, France
- Grand Palais (Hanoi), an exhibition palace in Hanoi, French Indochina
- List of palaces
- List of royal palaces
- Palace of the Grand Dukes of Lithuania, Vilnius
