= Gulfport School District =

School district in Mississippi, United States

Coordinates: 30.379907°N 89.086825°W

Location
- Gulfport, Mississippi United States

District information
- Type: Public
- Grades: K-12
- Superintendent: Glen East
- Accreditations: Southern Association of Colleges and Schools
- Enrollment: 6,113

Other information
- Website: www.gulfportschools.org

The Gulfport School District is a public school district based in Gulfport, Mississippi (USA).

== Schools ==
=== High school ===
- Gulfport High School

=== Middle schools ===
- Bayou View Middle School
- Gulfport Central Middle School

=== Elementary schools ===
- Anniston Avenue Elementary School
- Bayou View Elementary School
- Central Elementary School
- Pass Road Elementary School
- Twenty-Eighth St. Elementary School
- West Elementary School

=== Alternative ===
- High School GED Program "The Blue School"
- The Learning Center

=== Virtual ===
- GSD Virtual Academy

== Demographics ==
=== 2022-23 school year ===
There were a total of 6,113 students enrolled in the Gulfport School District during the 2022-2023 school year. The gender makeup of the district was 50% female and 50% male. The racial makeup of the district was 52.4% Black or African American, 33.5% White, 8.6% Hispanic or Latino, 1.2% Asian, and 4.0% Multiracial. 56.4% of the district's students were eligible to receive free lunch. 71.9% of the district's students participate in the federal free and reduced price meal program.

=== Previous school years ===
School Year	Enrollment	Gender Makeup		Racial Makeup						
School Year	Enrollment	Female	Male	Asian	Hispanic	African American	White	Multiracial	Alaskan Indian / Native American	Native Hawaiian / Pacific Islander
2022-23	6,113	3,059	3,054	75	525	3,202	2,048	246	*	*
2021-22	6,349	3,131	3,218	89	542	3,334	2,137	226	10	11
2020-21	6,367	3,107	3,260	85	524	3,360	2,182	191	11	14
2019-20	6,576	3,235	3,341	89	518	3,480	2,285	181	11	12
2018-19	6,487	3,253	3,234	68	467	3,464	2,315	154	*	*
2017-18	6,300	3,132	3,168	*	412	3,401	2,256	146	*	*
2016-17	6,300	3,082	3,218	63	400	3,409	2,320	87	10	11
2015-16	6,375	3,118	3,257	61	339	3,294	2,391	264	*	*
2014-15	6,467	3,170	3,297	58	3231	3,367	2,497	202	*	*
2013-14	6,335	3,146	3,189	53	274	3,271	2,547	167	*	*
2012-13	6,013	3,034	2,979	61	242	3,203	2,486	*	*	*
2011-12	5,802	2,912	2,890	58	238	3,097	2,393	*	*	*

* = Data Unavailable

== Accountability statistics ==
	2006-07	2005-06	2004-05	2003-04	2002-03
District Accreditation Status	Accredited	Accredited	Accredited	Accredited	Accredited
School Performance Classifications
Level 5 (Superior Performing) Schools	5	5	5	4	4
Level 4 (Exemplary) Schools	1	2	3	2	1
Level 3 (Successful) Schools	3	3	2	2	4
Level 2 (Under Performing) Schools	0	0	0	2	1
Level 1 (Low Performing) Schools	0	0	0	0	0
Not Assigned	0	0	0	0	0

== See also ==
- List of school districts in Mississippi
