= Palana =

Palana may refer to:

- Palana, Bikaner, India
- Palana, Kheda, India
- Palana, Russia
- Palana (river), in Russia
- Palana (crater), on Mars

== See also ==
- Palan (disambiguation)
