= Royal Palace (disambiguation) =

Royal Palace may refer to:

- A royal palace
  - list of royal palaces
  - Royal Palace (Belgrade)
- Palais-Royal, Paris, France
- Royal Palace (horse) (1964–1991), a British racehorse
- Royal Palace Museum (disambiguation)

== Other uses ==
- Old Royal Palace, Athens, Greece
- Old Royal Palace (Prague), Czech Republic
- Medieval Royal Palace (Buda Castle), Hungary

== See also ==
- Historic Royal Palaces, a British charity
- Royal Palace Guard, Belgian police
- Royal Castle (disambiguation)
- Palais Royal (disambiguation)
- Palace (disambiguation)
- Royal (disambiguation)
