= Royal Castle =

Royal Castle may refer to:

- Royal Castle (chain restaurant), founded in Miami
- Royal Castle (restaurant), restaurant chain in Trinidad and Tobago
- Royal Castle, Poznań, Poland
- Royal Castle, Warsaw, Poland
- Royal Castle of Laeken, Belgium, official residence of royal family
- Royal Castle Hotel, hotel in Dartmouth, Devon, England

== See also ==
- Royal Palace (disambiguation)
- Castle (disambiguation)
- Royal (disambiguation)
