= Pallone (surname) =

Pallone is a surname. Notable people with the surname include:

- Dave Pallone (born 1951), American former Major League Baseball umpire
- Frank Pallone (born 1951), American lawyer and politician
- John Pallone (born 1960), American Democratic Party politician

== See also ==
- Pallone (disambiguation)
- Palla (surname)
