= Palas Power Station =

- Country: Romania
- Location: Constanța, Constanța County
- Coordinates: 44°52′N 24°52′E
- Status: Operational
- Owner: Termoelectrica

Thermal power station
- Primary fuel: Natural gas and coke

Power generation
- Units operational: 2
- Nameplate capacity: 100 MW

The Palas Power Station is a large thermal power plant located in Constanța, Constanța County, Romania, having 2 generation groups of 50 MW each having a total electricity generation capacity of 100 MW.
