= Grand Palace Hotel, Riga =

Hotel in Riga, Latvia

Grand Palace Hotel

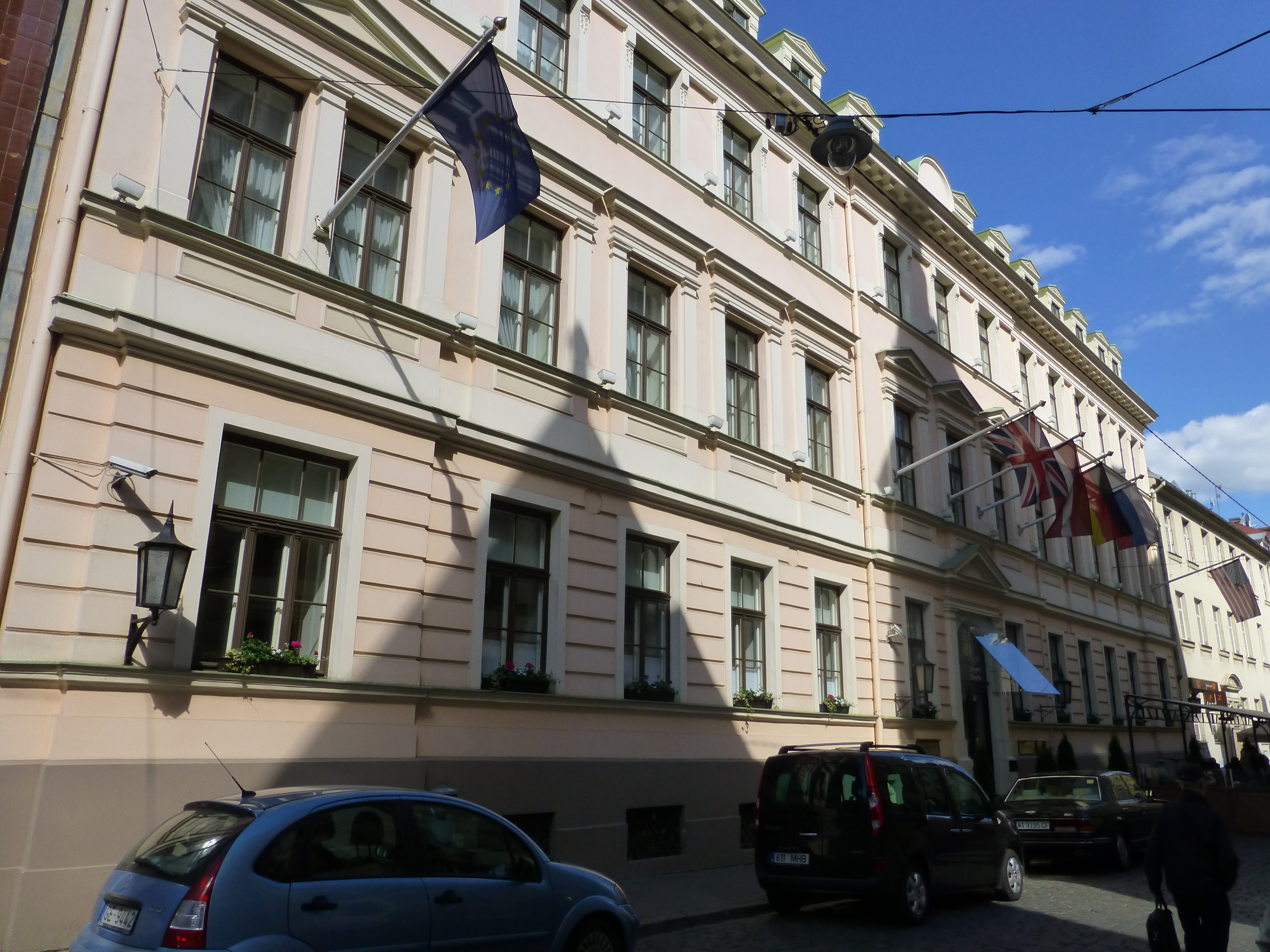

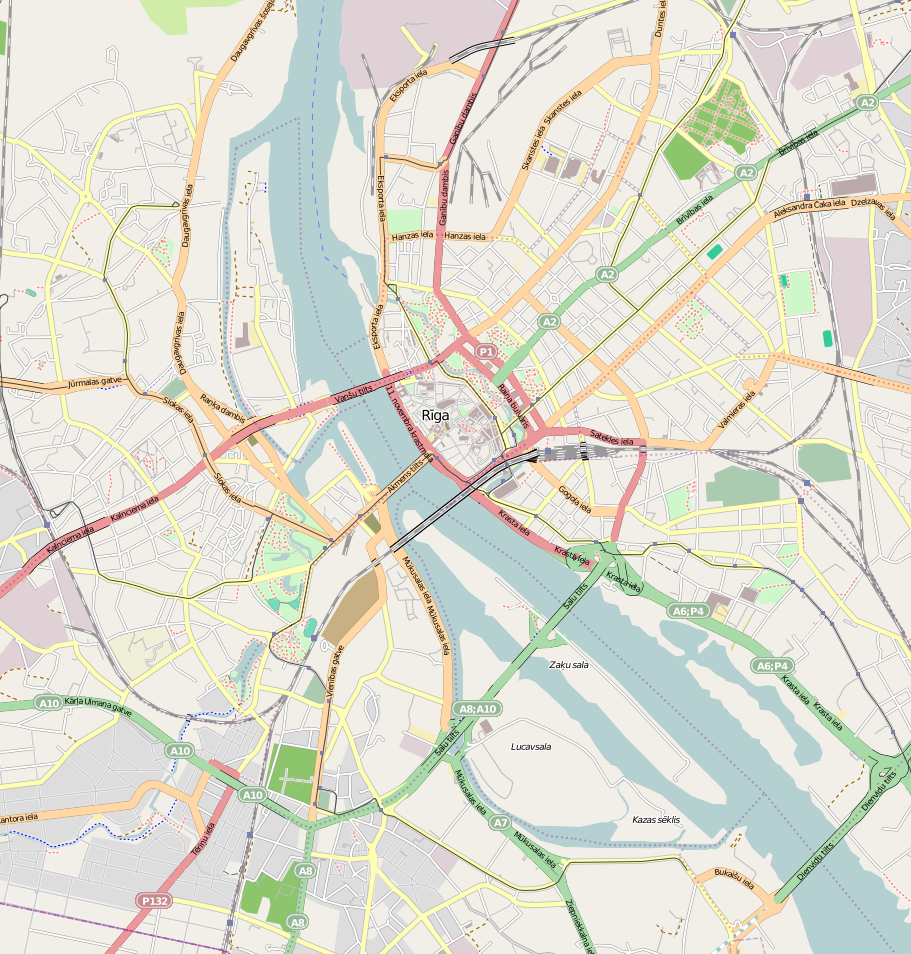
- Location within Riga

General information
- Location: Riga, Latvia, 12, Pils Street; Riga, LV-1050
- Coordinates: 56°57′1″N 24°6′10″E
- Owner: Schlössle Hotel Group

Other information
- Number of rooms: 56

Website
- grandpalaceriga.lv

Grand Palace Hotel is a 5 star hotel in Riga, Latvia, in a building originally erected 1877 to house a bank, but now with 56 hotel rooms. Grand Palace Hotel is member of The Leading Hotels of the World, and has been voted as Latvia's Leading Hotel for six years, latest being in 2010.
