= Paleta (surname) =

Paleta is a Polish surname. Notable people with the surname include:

- Dominika Paleta (born 1972), Polish-Mexican actress
- Ludwika Paleta (born 1978), Polish-Mexican actress
- Zbigniew Paleta (born 1942), Polish violinist and composer
