= Pallotti =

Pallotti is an Italian surname. Notable people with the surname include:

- Alessandra Pallotti (born 1974), Italian women's footballer
- Luigi Pallotti (1829–1890), Italian cardinal
- Vincent Pallotti (1795–1850), Italian Catholic priest, saint, founder of the Pallottines
