= Buddy Palazzo =

American football player (born 1951)

Profile
- Position: Quarterback

Personal information
- Born: March 8, 1951 (age 75); Gulfport, Mississippi
- Listed height: 6 ft 0 in (1.83 m)
- Listed weight: 199 lb (90 kg)

Career information
- High school: Gulfport
- College: Southern Miss
- NFL draft: 1973: undrafted

Career history
- Florida Blazers (1974)

Buddy Palazzo (born February 4, 1951) is a former professional American football quarterback who played for Florida Blazers in World Football League (WFL). He played college football at University of Southern Mississippi.
