= Ducal Palace =

Several palaces are named Ducal Palace (Italian: Palazzo Ducale [paˈlattso duˈkaːle]) because it was the seat or residence of a duke.

Notable palaces with the name include:

== France ==
- Palace of the Dukes of Burgundy, Dijon
- Palace of the Dukes of Lorraine, Nancy
- Palais ducal de Nevers, Nevers

== Italy ==
- Ducal Palace, Alvito
- Ducal Palace, Atina
- Ducal Palace, Castiglione del Lago
- Ducal Palace, Colorno
- Doge's Palace, Genoa
- Ducal Palace, Guastalla
- Ducal Palace, Gubbio
- Ducal Palace, Lucca
- Ducal Palace, Mantua
- Ducal Palace, Massa
- Ducal Palace, Modena
- Ducal Palace, Parete
- Ducal Palace, Pesaro
- Ducal Palace, Reggio Emilia
- Ducal Palace, Sabbioneta
- Ducal Palace, Sassari
- Ducal Palace, Sassuolo
- Ducal Palace, Serradifalco
- Palazzo Ducale, Urbino
- Doge's Palace, Venice

== Lithuania ==
- Old Kaunas Ducal Palace, Kaunas

== Portugal ==
- Ducal Palace, Vila Viçosa
- Palace of the Dukes of Braganza, Guimarães
- Palace of the Dukes of Cadaval, Évora
- Palace of the Dukes of Palmela, Lisbon

== Spain ==
- Ducal Palace, Gandia
- Ducal Palace, Lerma
- Ducal Palace, Pastrana
- Palace of the Dukes of Medinaceli, Cogolludo
- Palace of the Duke of Uceda, Madrid

== See also ==
- Grand Ducal Palace, Luxembourg
- Palace of the Grand Dukes of Lithuania
- Palace (disambiguation)
