= Pala (surname) =

The surname Pala may refer to:

- Ano Pala, Papua New Guinean politician
- Arden Pala, American philanthropist
- Doğukan Pala, Turkish footballer
- František Pála, Czech tennis player
- Giovanna Pala, Italian actress
- Hubert Pala, Polish footballer
- İskender Pala, Turkish professor and writer
- Kila Pala (born 1986), Papua New Guinean cricketer
- Libor Pala, Czech football coach
- Mathias Pala (born 1989), French rugby league player
- Ondřej Pála, Czech professional boxer
- Petr Pála, Czech tennis player
- Vincent Pala, Indian politician

== See also ==
- Pala dynasty (disambiguation)
- Pala (disambiguation)
