= Palai, Malakand =

Palai
- Union Council
- Location in Khyber Pakhtunkhwa Location in Pakistan
- Coordinates: 34°30′49.6″N 72°04′48.4″E
- Country: Pakistan
- Province: Khyber Pakhtunkhwa
- District: Malakand
- Time zone: UTC+5 (PST)

Palai is an administrative unit, known as Union council, of Malakand District in the Khyber Pakhtunkhwa province of Pakistan. It is renowned for its blood-red oranges due to the rich and well-drained soil found there.

Palai is also said to be the birthplace of Pushto folktale characters Adam Khan and Durkhani.The most prominent and leading figures of this village are Khan Sarbuland khan and Mashar Saeed Khan.

Palai is a large union council in Malakand with six villages. It covers an area from Kohi Barmol to Buner, including Banjer Baba, a popular spot for tourists. Palai is next to Thana, Malakand, near Chirat Ghar, known for its chinar trees and Geerband waterfall.

The Swat Motorway runs through Palai, making it one of the prettiest parts of the route. Two famous tunnels of the motorway are found here.

Palai is emerging as an educational hub, home to Government Degree College Palai, led by Principal Janger Khan, alongside other schools and colleges in the region.

The area is celebrated for the hospitality of its people, creating a welcoming haven for visitors.

== Villages ==
Palai Dara includes the villages Ziarat, Zormadai, Sher Khana, Koza Bazdara, Mora Banda and Bara Bazdara.

Adam Khan was born in Koza Bazdara, while Durkhani hailed from Bara Bazdara. Palai Dara has produced several poets including Anwar Hussain Zarin, Khaliq Dad Omeed, and Asfandyar Zia.

== Orchards ==
Palai and its surrounding villages in the Malakand district are famous for their fine-quality produce. This includes fruits such as peaches, guavas, the Palai red blood oranges and many other citrus fruits. The area is home to approximately 171,000 fruit-bearing trees; playing a vital role in the purification of the air and acting as a habitat to countless species of both flora and fauna.

Besides that, the orchards of the area attract tens of thousands of bees during the flowering season every year, serving as a homestead to the honey-making business. In the past few years, the area has observed an exponential increase in the number of trees and orchards, because of the government's arrangement of the water canal.

The construction of Swat Expressway (especially Palai Interchange) is supposed to take the area's agriculture and apiculture industries to a whole new level. This is because, the producers will get an opportunity to showcase their products in bigger markets; both nationally and internationally for the first time in history.

== See also ==
- Malakand District
