= Peter Simon Pallas =

German zoologist, botanist, and natural historian (1741–1811)

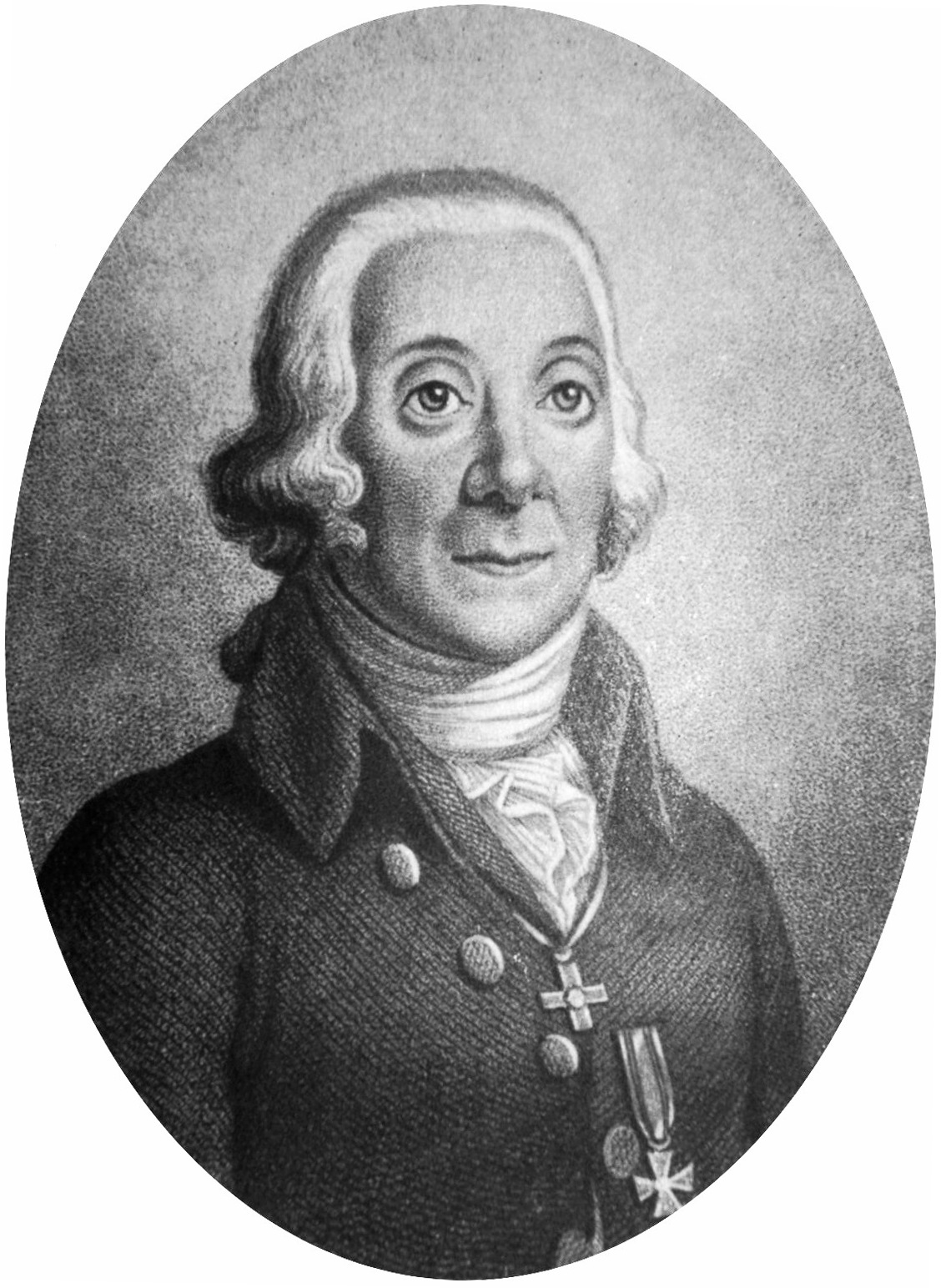
- Born: 22 September 1741; Berlin, Prussia
- Died: 8 September 1811 (aged 69); Berlin, Prussia
- Education: University of Göttingen; University of Halle; University of Leiden
- Known for: Pallasite meteorite Elevation crater theory
- Father: Simon Pallas
- Scientific career
- Fields: Zoology; Botany; Geography; Geology; Ethnography; Natural history Philology; Taxonomy
- Author abbrev. (botany): Pall.
- Author abbrev. (zoology): Pallas

Signature
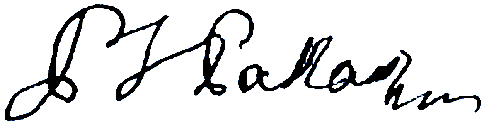

Peter Simon Pallas FRS FRSE (22 September 1741 – 8 September 1811) was a Prussian zoologist, botanist, ethnographer, explorer, geographer, geologist, natural historian, and taxonomist. He studied natural sciences at various universities in early modern Germany and worked primarily in the Russian Empire between 1767 and 1810.

== Life and work ==
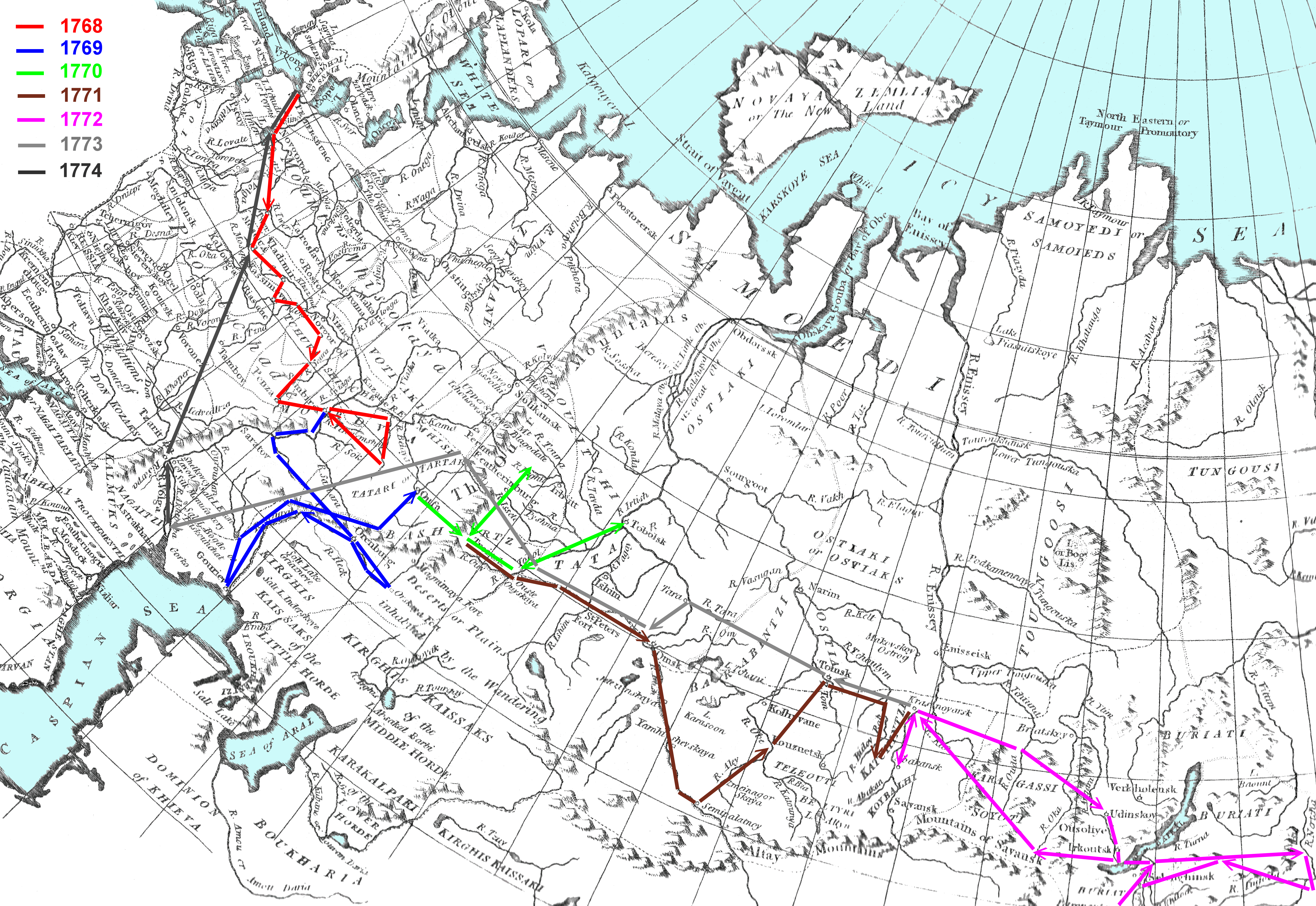
Pallas's travel routes and expeditions throughout the Russian Empire (1768–1774)

Peter Simon Pallas was born in Berlin, Kingdom of Prussia, the son of Professor of Surgery Simon Pallas. He studied with private tutors and took an interest in natural history, later attending the University of Halle and the University of Göttingen. In 1760, he moved to the University of Leiden and passed his doctor's degree at the age of 19.

Pallas travelled throughout the Dutch Republic and to London, improving his medical and surgical knowledge. He then settled at The Hague, and his new system of animal classification was praised by Georges Cuvier. Pallas wrote Miscellanea Zoologica (1766), which included descriptions of several vertebrates new to science which he had discovered in the Dutch museum collections. A planned voyage to Southern Africa and the East Indies fell through when his father recalled him to Berlin. There, he began work on his Spicilegia Zoologica (1767–1780).

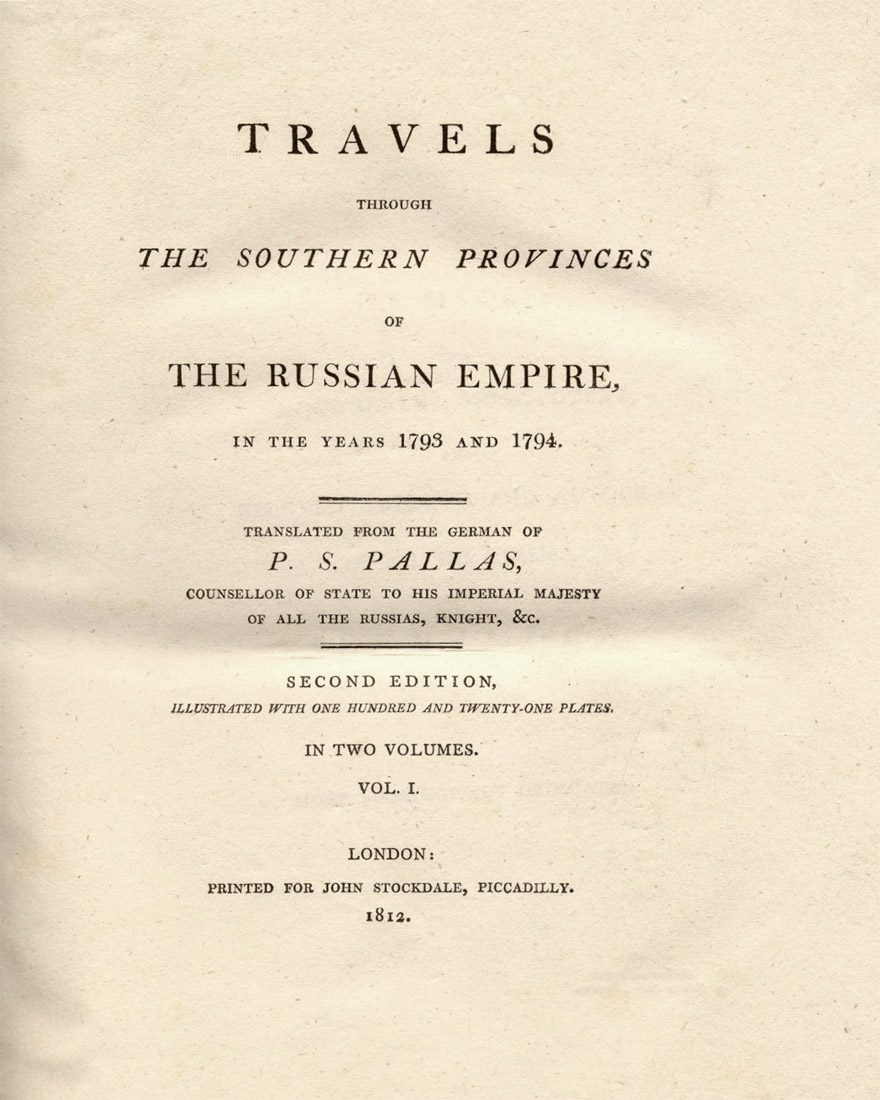
Title of the book Travels through the southern Provinces of the Russian Empire, in the years 1793 and 1794

In 1767, Pallas was invited by Catherine II of Russia to become a professor at the St Petersburg Academy of Sciences and, between 1768 and 1774, he led an expedition to central Russian provinces, Povolzhye, Urals, West Siberia, Altay, and Transbaikal, collecting natural history specimens for the academy. He explored the Caspian Sea, the Ural and Altai Mountains, and the upper Amur River, reaching as far eastward as Lake Baikal. The regular reports which Pallas sent to St Petersburg were collected and published as Reise durch verschiedene Provinzen des Russischen Reichs ("Journey through various provinces of the Russian Empire", 3 vols., 1771–1776). They covered a wide range of topics, including geology and mineralogy, ethnographic reports on the native Eurasian peoples and their indigenous religions, and descriptions of new plants and animals. In 1776, Pallas was elected a foreign member of the Royal Swedish Academy of Sciences.

Pallas settled in St Petersburg, becoming a favourite of Catherine II and teaching natural history to the Grand Dukes Alexander and Constantine. He was provided with the plants collected by other naturalists to compile the Flora Rossica (1784–1815), a Russian flora, and started work on his Zoographica Rosso-Asiatica (1811–31), a zoography of Russia and Asia. He also published an account of Johann Anton Güldenstädt's travels in the Caucasus. The Empress bought Pallas's large natural history collection for 2,000 rubles, 500 more than his asking price, and allowed him to keep them for life. During this period, Pallas helped plan the Mulovsky expedition, which was cancelled in October 1787.

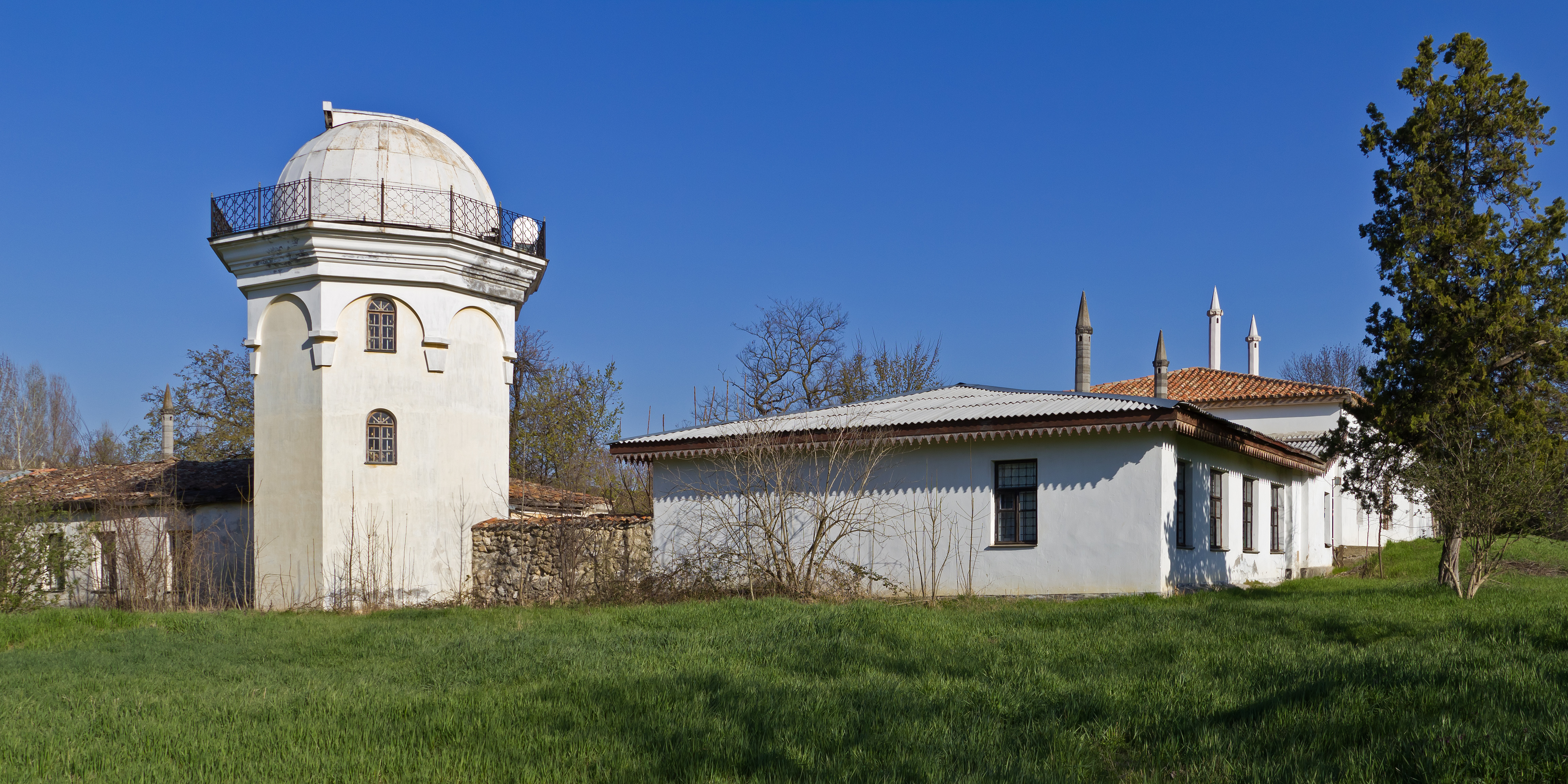
Pallas Estate in Simferopol

Between 1793 and 1794, Pallas led a second expedition to southern Russia, visiting the Crimea and the Black Sea. He was accompanied by his daughter (by his first wife who had died in 1782) and his new wife, an artist, servants, and a military escort. In February 1793, they travelled to Saratov and then downriver to Tsaritsyn. They explored the country to the east, and in August travelled along the banks of the Caspian Sea and into the Caucasus Mountains. In September, they travelled to the Crimea, wintering in Simferopol. Pallas spent early 1794 exploring to the southeast, and in July travelled up the valley of the Dnieper, arriving back in St Petersburg in September. Pallas gave his account of the journey in his P. S. Pallas Bemerkungen auf einer Reise in die Südlichen Statthalterschaften des Russischen Reichs (1799–1801). Catherine II gave him a large estate at Simferopol, where Pallas lived until the death of his second wife in 1810. He was then granted permission to leave Russia by Emperor Alexander, and returned to Berlin, where he died in the following year. His grave is preserved in the Protestant Friedhof I der Jerusalems- und Neuen Kirchengemeinde (Cemetery No. I of the congregations of Jerusalem's Church and New Church) in Berlin-Kreuzberg, south of Hallesches Tor.

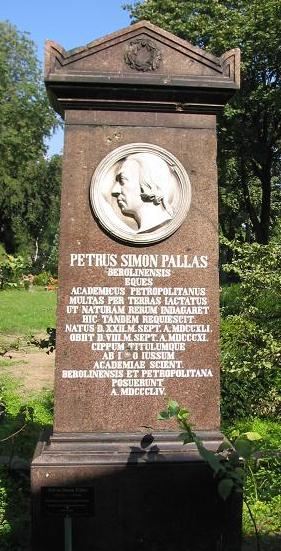
Headstone of Peter Simon Pallas in the Berlin-Kreuzberg cemetery

In 1809 he became an associate member of the Royal Institute of the Netherlands.

== Pallasite ==
In 1772, Pallas was shown a 680-kg lump of metal that had been found near Krasnoyarsk. Pallas arranged for it to be transported to St Petersburg. Subsequent analysis of the metal showed it to be a new type of stony-iron meteorite. This new type of meteorite was called pallasite after him; the meteorite itself is named Krasnojarsk or sometimes Pallas Iron (the name given to it by Ernst Chladni in 1794).

== Commemorated ==
Several animals were described by Pallas, and his surname is included in their common names, including: Pallas's glass lizard, Pallas's viper, Pallas's cat, Pallas's long-tongued bat, Pallas's tube-nosed bat, Pallas's squirrel, Pallas's leaf warbler, Pallas's cormorant, Pallas's fish-eagle, Pallas's gull, Pallas's sandgrouse, Pallas's rosefinch, and Pallas's grasshopper warbler.

Also, he is honoured in the scientific names of animals described by others, including: the Dagestani tortoise (Testudo graeca pallasi), Pallas's pika (Ochotona pallasi), Pallas's reed bunting (Emberiza pallasi), the East Siberian grayling (Thymallus pallasii) and the Pacific herring (Clupea pallasii).

He was also honoured in the name of a plant genus, Petrosimonia which is a genus of flowering plants belonging to the family Amaranthaceae.

Streets in Berlin and Castrop-Rauxel are named Pallasstraße. Pallasovka, a city in Volgograd Oblast, is named after him, and his monument stands there.

An asteroid is named after him: 21087 Petsimpallas. Eric Elst chose the name 26851 Sarapul for an asteroid because in Pallas's writings, he mentioned his liking of the city of Sarapul, Russia.

Pallas was elected a member of the American Philosophical Society in 1791.

== Works ==
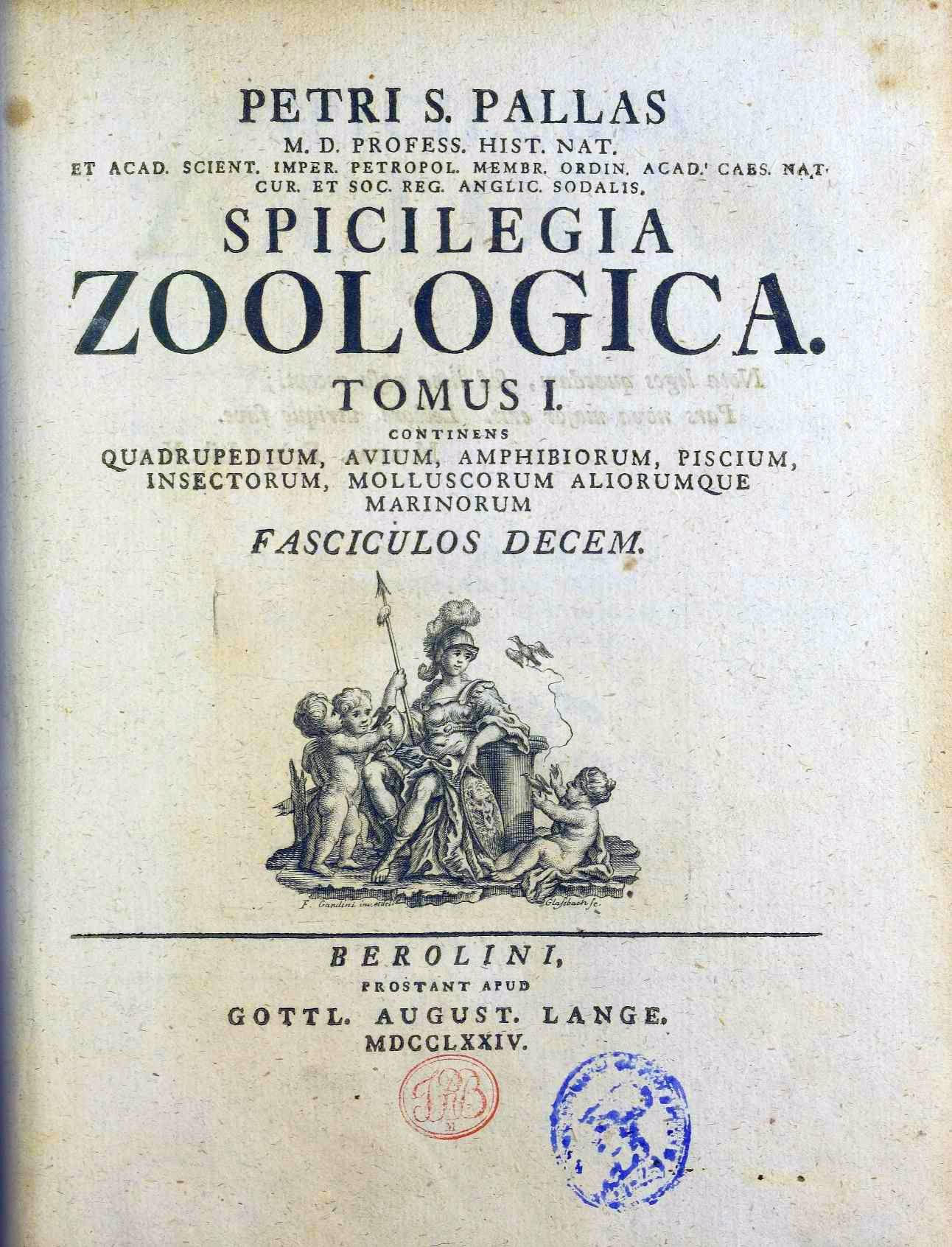
Spicilegia zoologica, 1774

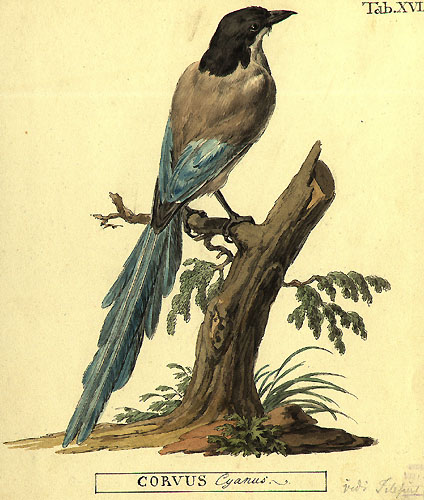
Cyanopica cyanus by Peter Simon Pallas

- Dissertatio inauguralis de infestis viventibus infra viventia (Leiden: Lugduni Batavorum, 1760).
- Elenchus zoophytorum, sistens generum adumbrationes generaliores et specierum cognitarum succinctas descriptiones, cum selectis auctorum synonymis (The Hague: van Cleef, 1766).
- Elenchus zoophytorum (in Latin). Den Haag: Franz Varrentrapp. 1766.
- Miscellanea zoologica, quibus novæ imprimis atque obscuræ animalum species describuntur et observationibus iconibusque illustrantur (The Hague, 1766).
- Spicilegia zoologica (in Latin). Vol. 1. Berlin: Gottlieb August Lange. 1774.
- Spicilegia zoologica (in Latin). Vol. 2. Berlin: Gottlieb August Lange. 1767.
- Spicilegia zoologica (in Latin). Vol. 3. Berlin: Gottlieb August Lange. 1767.
- Spicilegia zoologica (in Latin). Vol. 4. Berlin: Gottlieb August Lange. 1767.
- Spicilegia zoologica (in Latin). Vol. 5. Berlin: Gottlieb August Lange. 1769.
- Spicilegia zoologica (in Latin). Vol. 6. Berlin: Gottlieb August Lange. 1769.
- Spicilegia zoologica (in Latin). Vol. 7. Berlin: Gottlieb August Lange. 1769.
- Spicilegia zoologica (in Latin). Vol. 8. Berlin: Gottlieb August Lange. 1770.
- Spicilegia zoologica (in Latin). Vol. 9. Berlin: Gottlieb August Lange. 1772.
- Spicilegia zoologica (in Latin). Vol. 10. Berlin: Gottlieb August Lange. 1774.
- Spicilegia zoologica (Berlin, 1767–1780).
- Lyst der Plant-Dieren, bevattende de algemeene schetzen der geslachten en korte beschryvingen der bekende zoorten (Utrecht: van Paddenburg & van Schoonhoven, 1768).
- De ossibus Sibiriae fossilibus, craniis praesertim Rhinocerotum atque Buffalorum, observationes (Novi Commentarii Academiae Scientiarum Imperialis Petropolitanae, XIII, Saint Petersburg, 1768).
- Naturgeschichte merkwürdiger Thiere (Berlin, 1769–1778).
- Dierkundig mengelwerk, in het welke de nieuwe of nog duistere zoorten van dieren, door naauwkeurige afbeeldingen, beschryvingen en verhandelingen opgehelderd worden (Utrecht: van Paddenburg & van Schoonhoven, 1770).
- Reise durch verschiedene Provinzen des Russischen Reichs (Saint Petersburg, 1771–1801).
- Merkwürdigkeiten der Morduanen, Kasaken, Kalmücken, Kirgisen, Baschkiren etc., Frankfurt & Leipzig, 1773–1777, 3 vol.
- Puteshestviye po raznym provintsiyam Rossiyskogo gosudarstva (Saint Petersburg, 1773–1788).
- Flora Rossica (Saint Petersburg, 1774–1788, in 2 parts).
- Sammlungen historischer Nachrichten über die mongolischen Völkerschaften. St. Petersburg, Frankfurt, Leipzig 1776–1801.
- Observations sur la formation des montagnes et sur les changements arrivés au Globe, particulièrement à l'Empire de Russie (Acta Academiae Scientiarum Imperialis Petropolitanae, Saint Petersburg, 1777).
- Novae species Quadrupedum e Glirium ordine (Erlangen, 1778).
- Mémoires sur la variation des animaux (Acta Academiae Scientiarum Imperialis Petropolitanae, Saint Petersburg, 1780).
- Katalog rasteniyam, nakhodyashchimsya v Moskve v sadu yego prevoskhoditel'stva deystvitel'snogo statskogo sovetnika i Imperatorskogo Vopitatel'nogo doma znamenitogo blagodetelya, Prokofiya Akinfiyevich Demidova, sochinyonnyy P. S. Pallasom, adademikom sankt-peterburgskim (Saint Petersburg, 1781).
- Icones Insectorum praesertim Rossiae Sibiriaeque peculiarium (Erlangen, 1781–1806, in 4 issues).
- Opisaniye rasteniy Rossiyskogo gosudarstva, s ikh izobrazheniyami (Saint Petersburg, 1786).
- Sravnitel'nyye slovari vsekh yazykov i narechiy, sobrannyye desnitsey Vsevysochayshey osoby imperatritsy Yekateriny II (Saint Petersburg, 1787–1789, in 2 volumes).
- Tableau physique et topographique de la Tauride (Nova Acta Academiae Scientiarum Imperialis Petropolitanae, X, Saint Petersburg, 1792).
- Kratkoye fizicheskoye i topograficheskoye opisaniye Tavricheskoy oblasti (Saint Petersburg, 1795).
- Bemerkungen auf einer Reise in die südlichen Statthalterschaften des Rußischen Reichs in den Jahren 1793 und 1794 (Leipzig, 1799–1801)
- Species Astragalorum descriptae et iconibus coloratis illustratae (Leipzig, 1800).
- Travels through the southern provinces of the Russian Empire (London, 1802, in 2 volumes).
- Illustrationes plantarum imperfecte vel nondum cognitarum (Leipzig, 1803).
- Zoographia rosso-asiatica (Saint Petersburg, 1811, in 3 volumes).

== See also ==
- Pallas Mountain
