= Pallotta =

Pallotta is an Italian surname. Notable people with the surname include:

- Dan Pallotta (born 1961), American businessman
- Emidio Pallotta (1803–1868), Italian painter and architect
- Gabriella Pallotta (born 1938), Italian actress
- Giovanni Battista Maria Pallotta (1594–1668), Italian cardinal
- Giovanni Evangelista Pallotta (1548–1620), Italian cardinal
- Guglielmo Pallotta (1727–1795), Italian cardinal
- James Pallotta (born 1958), American businessman
- Blessed Maria Assunta Pallotta (1878–1905), Italian Roman Catholic professed religious
- Leonida Pallotta (1910–?), Italian footballer
- Tommy Pallotta (born 1968), American film director and producer
