= Eighteen Springs (album) =

Eighteen Springs New and Best collection 半生缘新歌和精选

Studio album by Ruby Lin
- Released: 1 April 2004
- Genre: Mandopop
- Label: BMG

Ruby Lin chronology
| Pala Pala (2001) | Eighteen Springs New and Best collection 半生缘新歌和精选 (2004) | Possessing Ruby Lin (2004) |

Eighteen Springs New and Best collection is an album by Taiwanese pop singer Ruby Lin. It contains two soundtracks for a 2003 drama-romance TV series based on the novel of the same title (Chinese: 半生緣; pinyin: Ban Sheng Yuan) by Chinese author Eileen Chang. It was released on 1 April 2004.

== Track listings ==
| No. | Title | Length |
|---|---|---|
| 1. | "Fated For Half a Lifetime (半生缘)" |
| 2. | "Passed Each Other By (擦肩而过)" |
| 3. | "The Past (過去)" |
| 4. | "Thinking of You (想這你)" |
| 5. | "Let Love Move Us Closer (愛再靠近一點)" |
| 6. | "Into Your Arms (投壞送抱)" |
| 7. | "Clouded In The Mist of Rain (雲深深雨濛濛)" |
| 8. | "New Romance (新浪漫)" |
| 9. | "Novel of Love (愛情小說)" |
| 10. | "The Way You Love Me (你这样爱我)" |
| 11. | "Ban Sheng Yuan (Strings Version)" |
| 12. | "Ban Sheng Yuan (Flute Version)" |
| 13. | "Let Love Move Us Closer (Strings Version)" |
| 14. | "Passed Each Other By (Strings Version)" |
| 15. | "Let Love Move Us Closer (Piano version)" |
| 16. | "The Past (Strings Version)" |
| 17. | "Let Love Move Us Closer (Music Box Version)" |
| 18. | "The Past (Piano Version)" |

== Awards and nominations ==
2004 East Wind Music Award

- Won : Best Theme Song From TV Series
