= Palla =

Palla may refer to:

- Palla (garment), a women's headcloth or shawl from ancient Rome
- Palla (butterfly), a brush-footed butterfly genus described by Jacob Hübner in 1819
- Palla (troubadour), a twelfth-century minstrel from Galicia
- Palla, North 24 Parganas, village in West Bengal, India
- Palla, a tortrix moth genus invalidly described by Gustaf Johan Billberg in 1820, nowadays considered a junior synonym of Pammene
- Palla (fish), see Ilish
- Palla (surname), a surname
- Palla (game), a ball game from Tuscany (Italy)

== See also ==
- Pall (disambiguation)
- Pala (disambiguation)
- Pallas (disambiguation)
- Pallium, an ecclesiastical vestment in the Roman Catholic Church
