= Simon Pallas =

Prussian physician

- Born: 1694; Berlin, Holy Roman Empire
- Died: July 24, 1770 (aged 75–76)
- Scientific career
- Fields: Medicine; Surgery
- Workplaces: Collegium medico-chirurgicum

Simon Pallas (1694 – July 24, 1770) was a Prussian physician.

Pallas was born in Berlin, where he remained through his life. He was professor of surgery at the Collegium medico-chirurgicum, and first surgeon at the Charité hospital. He was considered a bold surgeon, and wrote a number of textbooks on the subject.

He was the father of famous zoologist and botanist Peter Simon Pallas, and of physician August Friedrich Pallas.

== Writings ==
- Anleitung zur praktischen Chirurgie (Guide to Practical Surgery; 1763, 1770)
- Ueber die chirurgischen Operatione (On the Surgical Operations; 1763, 1770)
- Anleitung die Knochenkrankheiten zu heilen (Guide to Healing Bone Diseases; 1770)
