= Pala (folk art) =

- Types: Musical theatre
- Originating culture: Odia & Bengali
- Originating era: 1510 CE.

Pala is a cultural folk ballad form of Odisha, derived from Sanskrit and Odia literature. It is performed by a group of five or six people, consisting of a 'gayaka' (main singer), a 'bayaka' (drummer), and a 'palia' (chorus). The gayaka has a 'chamara' (fly-whisk) in his left hand, which he flourishes, and a pair of cymbals in his right hand. He narrates episodes from Puranic texts, punctuated with explanations. The chorus dance in small rhythmical steps along with the gayaka.

== Origin ==
Pala is found in Sarala Dasa's Mahabharata.

== Performance ==
The Pala generally performed on the occasion of Ekousia (21st day of the birth of a child, when the naming ceremony is observed) or 'Satyanarayana puja'. There are two forms of Pala, both are associated with the worship of lord Satyanarayana. They are 'Baithaki' (sitting) and 'Thia' (standing).

Sometimes, especially on the occasion of ritual festivals, competition of two or more groups are also arranged in which all the groups try their best to prove their moments. Thus, the singing gets elongated for several nights. As Pala in odisha dwells on ancient literature, a Pala singer is required to be a man well versed in Sanskrit and in odiya literature. The Pala singers commands the language of Sanskrit in at sharp and clear voice.

=== Gallery ===
A traditional Pala folk performance

Musical Odia folk play Pala

== See also ==
- Dasakathia
