= Possessing Ruby Lin =

Possessing Ruby Lin 擁有林心如

Studio album by Ruby Lin
- Released: 14 October 2004
- Genre: Mandopop, Cantonese
- Label: BMG, AEG

Ruby Lin chronology
Eighteen Springs New and Best collection (2004)	Possessing Ruby Lin 擁有林心如 (2004)	New Rubyology (2008)

Possessing Ruby Lin is a 2004 album by Taiwanese pop singer Ruby Lin. Compilation album which presents two new songs and 14 of her tunes.

== Track listing ==
1. 爱一个人快乐 Love One's Happiness
2. 放心一博 Give it a Go
3. 半生缘 18 Springs
4. 擦身而过 We passed by each other
5. 爱再靠近一点 Love, Move a little Closer
6. 投怀送抱 Falling into your arms
7. 云深深雨蒙蒙 Dense Cloud, Misty Rain
8. 夜宿兰桂坊 Overnight in Lan Kuai Fong
9. 冬眠地图 Hibernating Map
10. 新浪漫 New Romance
11. 一百八十分钟零七秒 180 Minutes and 7 Seconds
12. 采心 Harvesting Hearts
13. 笑话 Joke
14. 生死相许 Till Death Do Us Part

== Trivia ==
- Format : 1CD+1DVD-5
- Ruby Lin's last album with BMG Taiwan.
