= Pala, Kuusalu Parish =

Village in Estonia

Coordinates: 59°21′51″N 25°51′38″E

Pala
- Village
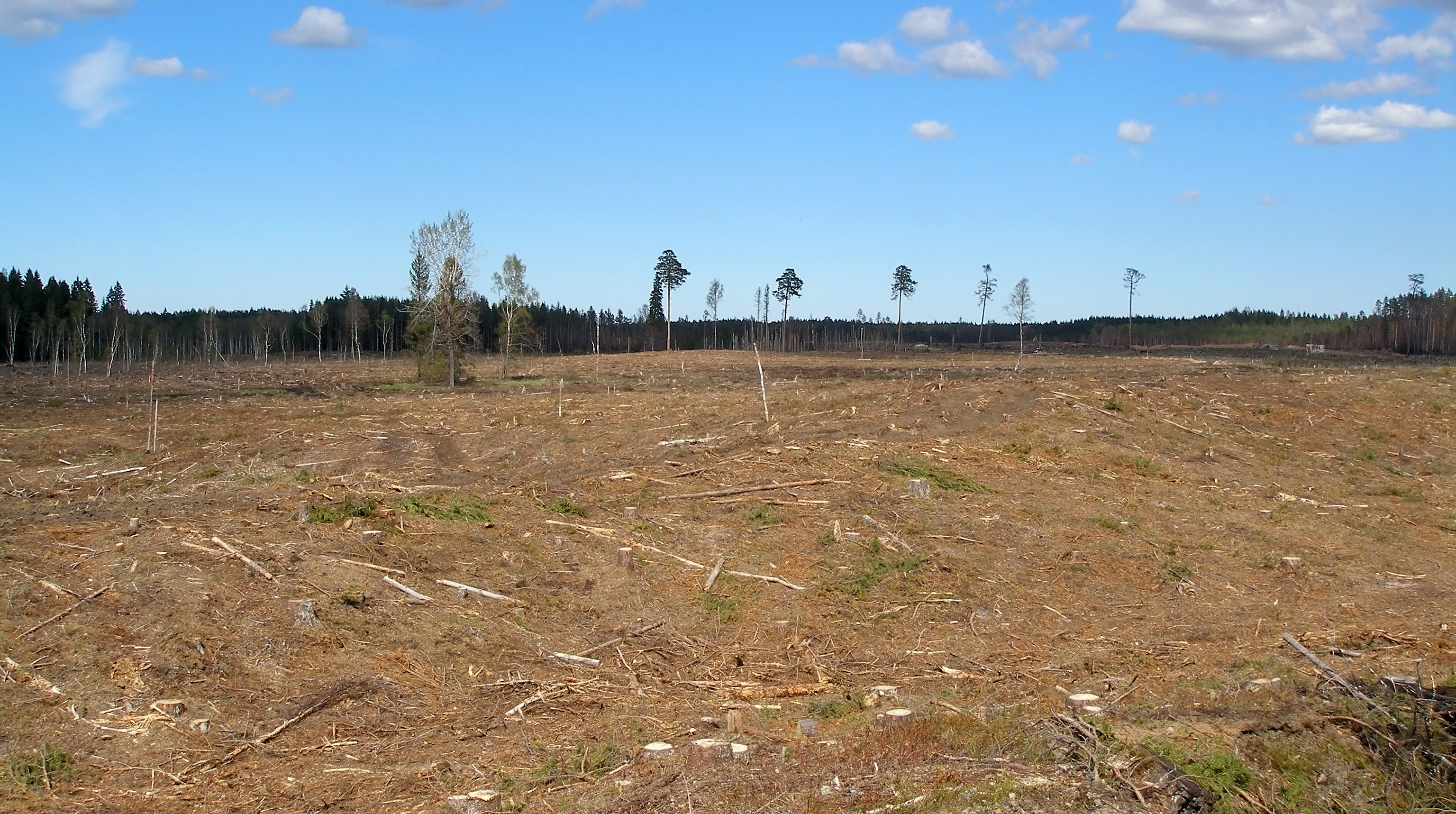
- Keskpolügoon in Pala village.
- Interactive map of Pala
- Country: Estonia
- County: Harju County
- Parish: Kuusalu Parish
- Time zone: UTC+2 (EET)
  - Summer (DST): UTC+3 (EEST)

Pala is a village in Kuusalu Parish, Harju County in northern Estonia.

Major part of the village's territory is occupied by Keskpolügoon, the central training area of the Estonian Defence Forces.
