= Pala Pala =

Para Para 趴啦趴拿

Studio album by Ruby Lin
- Released: 16 March 2001
- Genre: Mandopop Cantonese
- Label: BMG,

Ruby Lin chronology
Double Faced Ruby Lin (2001)	Para Para 趴啦趴拿 (2001)	Eighteen Springs New and Best collection (2004)

Para Para is an album by Taiwanese pop singer Ruby Lin. It marks the release of the second album by Bertelsmann Music Group(BMG). A few days after the release of Double Faced Ruby Lin album, BMG features new AVCD format special edition containing one cantonese song 'Para Para' and bonus VCD.

== Track listing ==
1. 叭啦叭拿 Para Para PaLaPaNa
2. 投懷送抱 Falling Into Your Arms
3. 云深深雨蒙蒙 Dense Cloud Misty Rain
4. 夜宿蘭桂坊 Overnight in Lan Kuai Fong
5. 誰都不愛 To Love Nobody
6. 不設防 Can't Let Go
7. 冬眠地圖 Hibernating Map
8. 新浪漫 New Romance
9. 愛情小說 Novel of Love
10. 每一種男生 Every Type of Guy
11. 你這樣愛我 The Way You Love Me

== Bonus VCD ==
1. 電腦檔案 Format Data (Not Playable)
2. 投懷送抱 ( Music Video )
3. 叭啦叭拿 (Music Video )
4. Making of 叭啦叭拿 ( Music Video )

== Awards and nominations ==
Hong Kong MTV Music Award

- Won: Best music video of the year

Hong Kong Metro Radio Awards

- Won: Favorite new singer
- Nom : Golden song of the year
