= Pala dynasty (disambiguation) =

Pala dynasty may refer to:

- Pala Empire (750–1174), Indian imperial power ruled by a dynasty centered in present-day Bengal
- Kamboja Pala dynasty, rulers of parts of the Bengal in the 10th to 11th centuries
- Pala dynasty (Kamarupa) (900–1100), Hindu rulers of Kamarupa kingdom in Assam
- Pal family, landowners of Panchakhanda, Greater Sylhet

== See also ==
- Pala (disambiguation)
