= Palais Royale Building =

Historic commercial building South Bend, Indiana, USA

- U.S. National Register of Historic Places
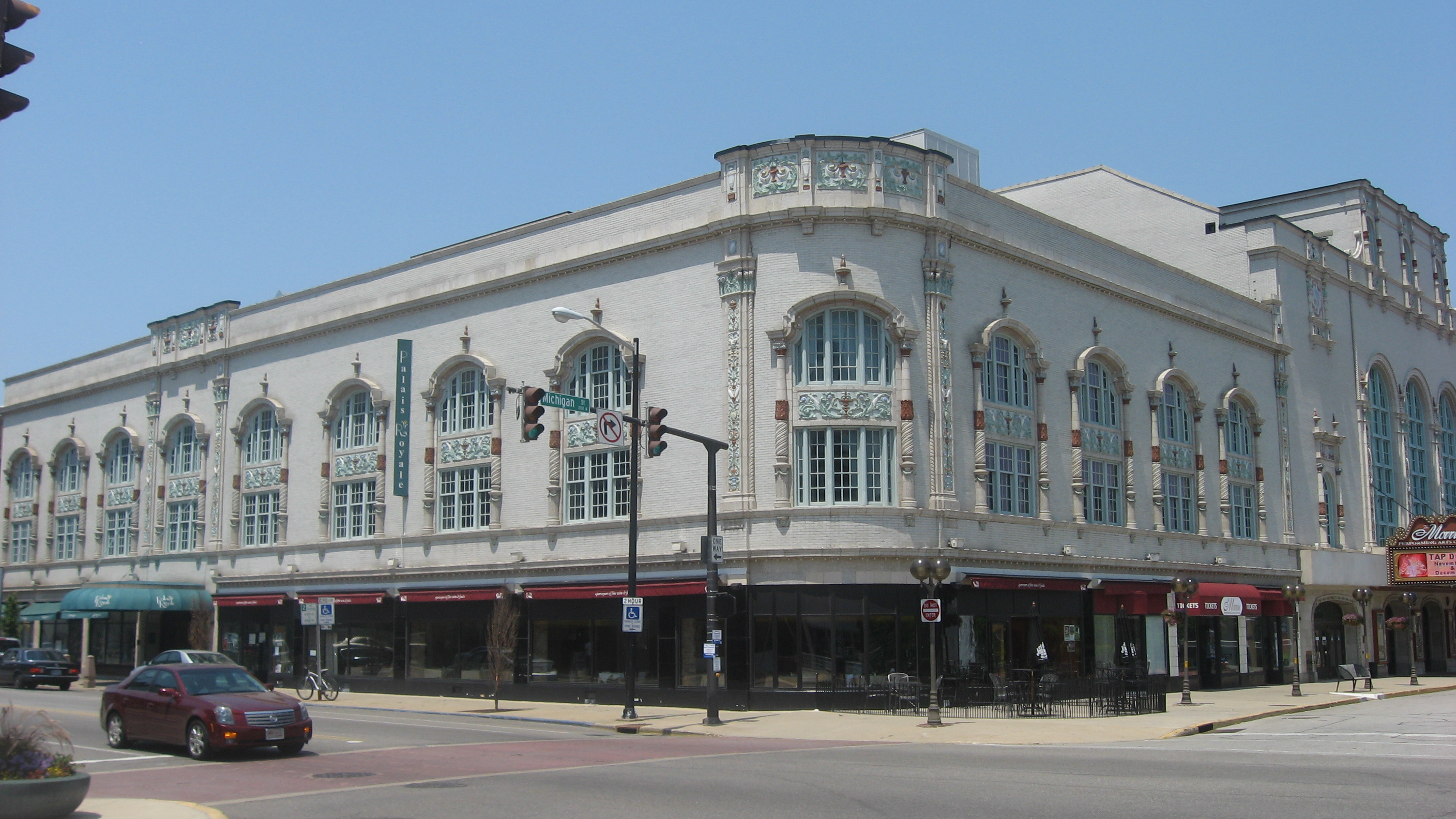
- Palais Royale Building, July 2012

- Location within Indiana
- Location: 113-105 W. Colfax Ave. and 201-209 N. Michigan St., South Bend, Indiana
- Coordinates: 41°40′40″N 86°15′1″W
- Area: less than one acre
- Built: 1922
- Architect: Aroner, J. S.; Handelsman, Jacob
- Architectural style: Spanish Renaissance Revival
- NRHP reference No.: 83000102
- Added to NRHP: July 21, 1983

Palais Royale Building is a historic commercial building located in South Bend, Indiana. It was built in 1922 along with the neighboring Palace Theater by the Palace Theater Corporation. It is a three-story, rectangular, Spanish Renaissance Revival-style brick building with finely crafted terra cotta ornamentation. It features a series of monumental semi-elliptical arched windows. The interior originally housed a two-story ballroom. A bombing on January 10, 1935, blew out most of the storefront windows and destroyed the corner suite.

It was listed on the National Register of Historic Places in 1983.
