= Li Yifeng =

Chinese actor and singer

- 李易峰
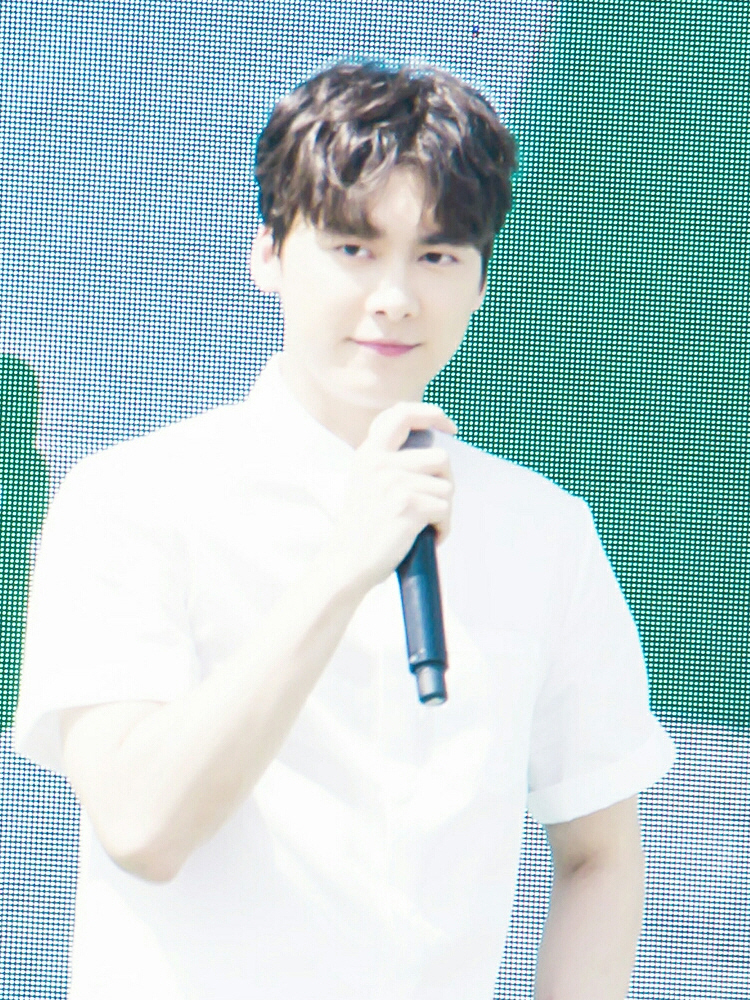
- Li in 2017
- Born: Li He; 4 May 1987 (age 39); Chengdu, Sichuan, China
- Education: Sichuan Normal University
- Occupations: Actor; Singer
- Years active: 2007–2022 • 2025-present
- Agent: Bravo Stars
- Musical career
- Also known as: Evan Li
- Origin: Shanghai, China
- Genre: Mandopop
- Instrument: Vocals

Legal name: Li Yifeng
- Chinese: 李易峰
Transcriptions
Standard Mandarin
- Hanyu Pinyin: Lǐ Yìfēng

Birth name: Li He
- Simplified Chinese: 李贺
- Traditional Chinese: 李賀
Transcriptions
Standard Mandarin
- Hanyu Pinyin: Lǐ Hè

Li Yifeng (born Li He, 4 May 1987) also known as Evan Li, is a Chinese actor and singer. Li launched his career after participating in the talent show My Hero (2007). Since 2009, he shifted to acting. Li is known for his roles in television dramas Swords of Legends (2014), The Lost Tomb (2015), Noble Aspirations (2016), Sparrow (2016), Fearless Whispers (2020), Day Breaker (2022), as well as in films Mr. Six (2015), for which he won the Hundred Flowers Awards for Best Supporting Actor, and Animal World (2018). Li ranked 9th on Forbes China Celebrity list in 2015, 11th in 2017, and 26th in 2019.

Li's career was suspended in 2022 after he was detained by the police for soliciting prostitutes.

== Early life ==
Li was born in Chengdu, Sichuan.

- Primary School (1994–2000): Chengdu Sanshengjie Primary School
- Junior High School (2000–2003): Chengdu Xuedao Street Middle School
- Senior High School (2003–2006): Chengdu Fifth Middle School
- University (2006–2010): Department of Broadcasting and Hosting, School of Film and Television, Sichuan Normal University

== Career ==
=== 2007–2013: Beginnings ===
In 2007, Li participated in the talent show, My Hero, coming in at 8th place and winning the Most Popular Contestant award. He released his first single "The One I Love Hurts Me The Most" and his first EP Four Leaf Clover in November 2007.

In 2009, Li made his acting debut in the drama The Prince of Tennis 2, adapted from the Japanese anime The Prince of Tennis. His role is the equivalent of Saeki Kojirou in the original anime. The same year, Li released his first full-length album Mr Child.

Li gained recognition after starring in the Taiwanese drama Sunny Happiness, which achieved high ratings in both Taiwan and China. He received the Best New Actor award at the 2011 China TV Drama Awards for his performance. The same year, he made his feature film debut in Lovesick, starring alongside Ariel Lin and Chen Bolin.

In 2012, Li starred in the television series White Lies and earned praise for his performance as an autistic youth. In 2013, Li starred in the romance revenge drama The Return of a Princess, and won the Best Acting Idol award at the 2013 China TV Drama Awards and the Most Popular Actor award at the 2013 LeTV Awards.

=== 2014–2022: Breakthrough and mainstream popularity ===
Li achieved breakthrough with the fantasy action drama Swords of Legends (2014), where he portrayed the protagonist Baili Tusu. Li became the first male actor to win the Newcomer Award at the 2014 Elle Style Awards. The same year, Li released his first autobiographical book entitled A Once in a Lifetime Moment.

Li solidified his popularity with two hit dramas in 2015: period drama Legend of Fragrance and action adventure web drama The Lost Tomb where he played the role of Wu Xie, based on the popular tomb-raiding novel Daomu Biji. The same year Li worked as a producer for the first time, taking part in the production of outdoor variety show Lets Go! Go! Go!.

Li's starred in two films in 2015, coming-of-age tale Forever Young and romance drama Fall in Love Like a Star, both were panned by critics. He bounced back in December 2015 with a supporting role in Feng Xiaogang's crime blockbuster Mr. Six, where he plays a rebellious youth who runs away from home because of conflicts with his father and later gets into trouble with gangsters. The film topped Chinese box office charts and won critical acclaim. Li won the Best Supporting Actor award for his performance at the 33rd Hundred Flowers Awards.

Following his success, Li entered the 2015 Forbes Chinese Celebrity list for the first time, placing at 9th with an estimated revenue of 69 million yuan (US$10.5 million; €9.6 million). He was also named "Most Commercially Valuable Celebrity" by CBN Weekly.

In 2016, Li was appointed the Chinese Spectator Ambassador for the blockbuster film Batman v Superman: Dawn of Justice. The same month, Li the attended 2016 Style Icon Asia Awards as the only Chinese representative, and won the 2016 SIA Style Icon Award.

In 2016, Li starred as the protagonist in both seasons of Noble Aspirations, adapted from popular xianxia novel Zhu Xian. The drama received positive reviews and surpassed 28 billion views, becoming one of the most watched Chinese dramas. He then starred in Sparrow, an espionage series set in the 1940s. The drama received critical acclaim, and became the second highest rated drama of the year with the finale reaching the peak rating of 2.46. Li won the Best Actor award at the China TV Golden Eagle Award for his performance.

In 2017, Li starred in the suspense crime film Guilty of Mind, based on the novel Evil Minds by Lei Mi.

In 2018, Li appeared in CCTV New Year's Gala for the first time, performing the song "The New Era of Zanzan". The same year he starred in the thriller film Animal World, based on the Japanese manga series Ultimate Survivor Kaiji. The film received positive reviews and topped the box office of the week of its release.

In 2020, Li starred in modern romance drama Wait in Beijing and historical spy drama Fearless Whispers. The latter was in the Top 10 of 2020 highest-rated dramas.

In 2021, Li starred in the first Chinese rocket force themed military television series The Glory of Youth, produced by People's Liberation Army Rocket Force. He also starred in the xianxia fantasy drama Mirror: Twin Cities.

In 2022, the suspense series Day Breaker, in which Li took on the protagonist role, was released. The drama received positive reviews, ranked 2nd on 2022 top suspense dramas list.

=== 2022–Present: Career stoppage ===
On 11 September 2022, Beijing police detained Li for multiple incidents of soliciting prostitutes, which he had confessed to. After the announcement, multiple brands such as Prada, Panerai, Remy Martin and L'Oréal Paris terminated their partnership agreements with Li. Li's social media accounts, as well as those of his studio and fan club, were suspended. Li's Weibo account was subsequently deleted, and his drama series and films were removed from the Chinese Internet and streaming services.

On 12 April 2025, after over two years of hiatus, Li held his comeback concert, "Covenant of the Green Sea," in Bangkok, Thailand.

== Personal life ==
=== Relationships ===
In 2014, Li mentioned on a variety show that he had a Korean girlfriend, which was speculated to be Korean actress Lee Da-hae, his co-star in The Honey Party of Love (2012). Lee, however, denied the speculation.

In 2022, the internet influencer Guo Ziyu came out as Li's girlfriend for three years, expressing her disappointment at Li's soliciting prostitution and accusing him of cheating with another influencer in their relationship.

== Filmography ==
=== Film ===
Year	English title	Chinese title	Role	Notes/Ref.
2011	Lovesick	恋爱恐慌症	Cui Ailun	
2015	Forever Young	栀子花开	Xu Nuo	
2015	Fall in Love Like a Star	怦然星动	Su Xingyu	
2015	Mr. Six	老炮儿	Zhang Xiaobo	
2017	Guilty of Mind	心理罪	Fang Mu	
2017	The Founding of an Army	建军大业	He Changgong	
2018	Animal World	动物世界	Zheng Kaisi	
2020	My People, My Homeland	我和我的家乡	Jiang Xiaofeng	
2021	The Pioneer	革命者	Mao Zedong	
TBA	Playground	操场	Zong Shaobin	

=== Television series ===
Year	English title	Chinese title	Role	Network	Notes/Ref.
2009	The Prince of Tennis 2	加油! 网球王子 II	Zuo Bo	Dragon TV	
2010	Happy & Love Forever	幸福一定强	Lu Shen	Anhui TV	
2011	Sunny Happiness	幸福最晴天	Xiang Yunchao	Anhui TV, CTV	
2012	White Lies	真爱谎言	Jiang Xiyu	Jiangxi TV, CTi	
2012	Happy Michelin Kitchen	幸福三颗星	Xiang Yunchao	Anhui TV, CTV	Cameo
2012	Bounty Hunter	赏金猎人	Yu Tai	Hunan TV	
2012	Love Actually	爱的蜜方	Chen Liyang	Hunan TV	
2013	The Return of a Princess	千金归来	Lin Hao	Dragon TV	
2014	Swords of Legends	古剑奇谭	Baili Tusu	Hunan TV	
2014	Tiny Times	小时代之折纸时代	Jian Xi	Youku	
2014	The Joyfully Pretty Enemy	欢天喜地俏冤家	Chen Sanliu	CCTV-8	
2015	Legend of Fragrance	活色生香	Ning Zhiyuan	Hunan TV	
2015	The Lost Tomb	盗墓笔记	Wu Xie	iQiyi	
2016	Noble Aspirations	青云志	Zhang Xiaofan	Hunan TV	
2016	Sparrow	麻雀	Chen Shen	Hunan TV	
2016	Noble Aspirations 2	青云志2	Zhang Xiaofan / Gui Li	Beijing TV	
2020	Wait in Beijing	我在北京等你	Xu Tian	Jiangsu TV, Zhejiang TV	
2020	Fearless Whispers	隐秘而伟大	Gu Yaodong	CCTV-8	
2021	The Glory of Youth	号手就位	Xia Zhuo	Jiangsu TV, Zhejiang TV	
2022	Mirror: A Tale of Twin Cities	镜·双城	Su Mo	Tencent	
2022	Day Breaker	暗夜行者	Chen Mo / Luo Xiang	IQIYI	

=== Short film ===
Year	English title	Chinese title	Role	Notes/Ref.
2014	Want To See Him, Tell Him Through Netease	想见他 就在易信告诉他		
2014	The Most Beautiful Performance 2014	2014最美表演	President	
2015	Being Real is Fun	真实才够FUN		
2015	Bring Love Home 2015	把乐带回家2015	Son	
2015	Add You Add The Taste of New Year	加你加年味	Xiao Feng	
2015	Unilever: Zhu Geliang	凌仕：诸葛亮篇		
2015	Unilever: Archimedes	凌仕：阿基米德篇		
2015	Finding Difference	大家来找茶		
2015	Love in Number	数字恋爱	Zi Jian	
2015	I Am Your Diedie Phone	我是你的喋喋phone	Diedie	
2015	Who Is Your Dish 2015	谁是你的菜2015		
2015	A Hundred Challenge Waiting For You	百事挑赞 由你来战		
2015	Li Yifeng x McLaren Automotive 650S	李易峰×迈凯伦650S		
2015	No Fear of Challenge	无惧挑战 成就自我		
2015	Chaos With Me	和我一起破坏 一起嗨		
2015	The Girl I Missed	错过的爱		
2015	0 Inches Girl	0码女孩		
2015	What I Want I Want Now	我要的现在就要		
2015	Gliding to Heartbeat	丝滑到心跳		
2015	Wear K Life and Be High	穿上K-Life 一起出来嗨		
2015	Love in Today	爱在今天 即是永恒		
2015	Eos M Partners with Li Yifeng	EOS M携手李易峰		
2016	Bring Happiness Home: Monkey King's Family	把乐带回家之猴王世家		
2016	0 Calories Go Chang	0脂肪才go畅		
2016	Legend of Searching Nian	寻年传说		
2016	Charge For 5 Mins, Talk For 2 Hours	充电5分钟 通话2小时		
2016	You Are Not Only You	你不止是你		
2016	Not Only One Side	不止一面 大有看头		
2016	Tales of a Fashion Buyer	解忧买手店		
2017	Fats Investigation Agency	肌密调查局		
2017	Time Crack	看不见的TA之时间裂缝		
2017	One Man Show	独角戏		
2018	As Time Goes By	时间流逝		
2019	Youth and My Motherland	青春与祖国同在		
2020	Unspeakable Love	谈不了的恋爱	Li Bin	
2021	Me and The Taste of my Hometown	我和我的家乡味		

=== Variety show ===
Year	English title	Chinese title	Role	Network	Notes/Ref.
2018	Dunk of China	这！就是灌篮	Cast member	Youku	
2019	Game On	我要打篮球	Cast member	Tencent Video	
2021	The Hero	最后的赢家	Cast member	iQIYI	

== Discography ==
=== Albums ===
Year	English title	Chinese title	Release date	Label	Notes/Ref.
2007	Four Leaf Clover	四叶草	19 November 2007		
2008	Ferris Wheel	摩天轮	20 July 2008	EQ Record	
2009	Mr. Child	小先生	17 May 2010	EQ Record	
2010	That Song	那首歌	29 October 2010	EQ Record	
2014	Yifeng's Love Letter	易峰情书	10 November 2014	Sony Music Entertainment	
2019	Dream Visit		24 April 2019		

=== Singles ===
Year	English title	Chinese title	Album	Notes/Ref.
2007	"The One I Love Hurts Me The Most"	我爱的人伤我最深	Banquet	
2008	"To Shine Brilliantly"	大放异彩		Olympic theme song with Hu Haiquan
2008	"Little Girl Don't Cry"	娃娃不哭		Earthquake relieve charity song Lyrics written by Li Yifeng
2008	"Believe in Love"	相信爱		Earthquake relieve charity song
2012	"Underworld"	江湖	Bounty Hunter OST	
2014	"Sword Wound"	剑伤	Swords of Legends OST	
2014	"Sword of Heart"	剑心	Swords of Legends OST	
2014	"Warm Heart Stings"	心如玄铁	Legend of Fragrance OST	
2014	"What I Want, I Want It Now"	我要的现在就要	Choice OST	
2015	"Goodbye Goodbye"	再见再见	Forever Young OST	
2015	"In a Rare You"	年少有你	Forever Young OST	
2015	"Please Contact Me"	请跟我联络	Fall in Love Like a Star OST	
2015	"The Price of Love"	爱的代价	Mr Six OST	with Feng Xiaogang
2016	"Time Cracks"	时间裂缝	Noble Aspirations 2 OST	
2017	"Love in the Spring Bud"	爱在春蕾		Spring Bud Project theme song with Hao Wei
2018	"The New Era of Zanzan"	赞赞新时代		Performance for CCTV Spring Gala
2018	"Role"	角色		Lyrics written by Li Yifeng with Lexie Liu
2018	"Tiny Yet Great"	渺小却伟大		
2019	"Youth Rave It Up"	青春跃起来		Performance for CCTV Spring Gala with Zhu Yilong
2019	"Youth Needs Warmth"	青春需要温暖		For anti-bullying campaign
2020	"Dance With Me"	与我共舞		Feat. Mosaic
2022	"Flashbacks of Life"	倒敘的生活		

== Accolades ==
=== Awards and nominations ===
Major awards
Year	Award	Category	Nominated work	Result	Ref.
2015	17th Huading Awards	Best Actor (Ancient Drama)	Swords of Legends	Nominated	
2016	33rd Hundred Flowers Awards	Best Supporting Actor	Mr. Six	Won	
2016	16th Chinese Film Media Awards	Most Anticipated Actor	Mr. Six	Nominated	
2017	22nd Huading Awards	Best Actor	Noble Aspirations	Rescinded	
2017	22nd Huading Awards	Top 10 Audience's Favorite TV Star	Noble Aspirations	Rescinded	
2017	27th Zhejiang TV Peony Awards	Outstanding Actor	Sparrow	Won	
2018	29th China TV Golden Eagle Award	Best Actor	Sparrow	Won	
2018	12th China Golden Eagle TV Arts Festival	Most Popular Actor	Sparrow	Won	
2018	15th Guangzhou Student Film Festival	Most Popular Actor	Animal World	Won	
2018	5th Beijing Youth Film Festival	Popularity Award	Animal World	Won	
2020	7th The Actors of China Award Ceremony	Best Actor (Emerald)	Wait in Beijing, Fearless Whispers	Won	
Film and television awards
2011	Youku Television Index Awards	New All-Rounded Idol Award	Sunny Happiness	Won	
2011	3rd China TV Drama Awards	Best New Actor	Sunny Happiness	Won	
2013	4th 4th LeTV Movie and Drama Awards	Most Popular Actor	Daughter's Return	Won	
2013	5th China TV Drama Awards	Best Acting Idol	Daughter's Return	Won	
2014	4th iQiyi All-Star Carnival	Most Popular Actor (Mainland China)	Swords of Legends	Won	
2014	6th China TV Drama Awards	Most Popular Actor (Mainland China)	Swords of Legends	Won	
2014	6th China TV Drama Awards	Most Commercially Valuable Actor	Swords of Legends	Won	
2014	Baidu Entertainment Hot Point	Most Popular Actor	Swords of Legends	Won	
2016	China Original Literature Billboard Awards	Best Actor	Noble Aspirations	Won	
2016	10th Tencent Video Star Awards	Most Popular TV Actor	Noble Aspirations, Sparrow	Won	
2016	10th Tencent Video Star Awards	VIP Star of the Year	—N/a	Won	
2016	8th China TV Drama Awards	Artist of the Year	Sparrow	Won	
2016	16th New & Sharp Top List	Artist of the Year	Sparrow	Won	
2021	Tencent Entertainment White Paper Awards	Praiseworthy Artist of the Year	Fearless Whispers	Won	
Music awards
2008	6th Southeast Music Chart Awards	Best Newcomer (Mainland China)	Ferris Wheel	Won	
2008	1st New Artist Awards of Top Chinese Music Chart	Best Newcomer EP	Ferris Wheel	Won	
2009	Music Radio China Top Chart Awards	Campus Popularity Award	Ferris Wheel	Won	
2010	CCTV-MTV Music Awards	Most Promising Artist	Mr. Child	Won	
2016	10th MIGU Music Awards	Top Ten Golden Songs	"Please Contact Me"	Won	
Others
2012	MSN Fashion Party	New Artist Award	—N/a	Won	
2013	Chinese Campus Art Glory Festival	Most Popular Actor	—N/a	Won	
2014	11th Elle Style Awards	Newcomer Award	—N/a	Won	
2014	Bazaar Men of the Year Awards	Most Attractive Celebrity	—N/a	Won	
2014	11th Man at His Best Awards	New Forces Award	—N/a	Won	
2014	Baidu Entertainment Hot Point	Top Ten People in the Spotlight	—N/a	Won	
2015	GQ China Men of the Year Awards	Trendy Artist of the Year	—N/a	Won	
2016	Style Icon Asia Awards	Style Icon Award	—N/a	Won	
2016	Weibo Fan Festival	Person of the Year	—N/a	Won	
2016	Baidu Entertainment Awards	Person of the Year	—N/a	Won	
2017	2nd Weibo Movie Awards Ceremony	Most Anticipated Film Male God	—N/a	Won	
2018	Weibo Awards Ceremony	Hot Search Artist	—N/a	Won	
2018	3rd Weibo Movie Awards Ceremony	Breakthrough Performance Award	—N/a	Won	
2018	Cosmo Beauty Ceremony	Beautiful Idol	—N/a	Won	
2018	L'Officiel Night	Generation Transformation Award	—N/a	Won	
2018	Jinri Toutiao Awards	Most Powerful Actor	—N/a	Won	
2019	Weibo Awards Ceremony	Person of the Year	—N/a	Won	
2019	GQ 2019 Men of the Year	Goodwill Ambassador	—N/a	Won	
2020	GQ 2020 Men of the Year	Upward Power Actor of the Year	—N/a	Won	
2021	Douyin Star Motion Night Awards	Warm Star of the Year	—N/a	Won	
2021	Huasheng Media Fashion Culture Awards	Influential Award of the Year	—N/a	Won	
2022	Weibo Movie Night 2022	Attracts The Most Attention Actor of the Year	—N/a	Won	

=== Forbes China Celebrity 100 ===
Year	Rank	Ref.
2015	9th	
2017	11th	
2019	26th	
2020	43rd	
