= 17th Huading Awards =

2015 entertainment awards

- Date: August 9, 2015

The 17th Huading Awards ceremony was held on August 9, 2015 at Shanghai.

== Nominations and winners ==
Complete list of nominees and winners (denoted in bold)

| Best Director | Best Screenwriter |
|---|---|
| **Zheng Xiaolong** – **Red Sorghum**; Yao Xiaofeng – Tiger Mom; Kong Sheng – All Quiet in Peking; Zhao Baogang – The Young Doctor; Wang Jun – Honey Bee Man | **Li Xiao** – **May December Love**; Liu Heping – All Quiet in Peking; Zhao Dongling – Red Sorghum; Gao Mantang – The Chinese Farmers; Kun Jian – Tiger Mom |
| Best Actor | Best Actress |
| **Tong Dawei** – **Tiger Mom**; Wallace Chung – My Sunshine; Zhang Jiayi – A Servant Of Two Masters; Chen Baoguo – The Chinese Farmers; Deng Chao – Ten Years of Love | **Zhou Xun** – **Red Sorghum**; Fan Bingbing – The Empress of China; Zhao Wei – Tiger Mom; Tiffany Tang – My Sunshine; Yang Mi – Swords of Legends |
| Best Actor (Ancient Drama) | Best Actress (Ancient Drama) |
| **Aarif Lee** – **The Empress of China**; Lu Yi – Palace 3: The Lost Daughter; Chen Xiao – The Romance of the Condor Heroes; Raymond Lam – The Virtuous Queen of Han; Li Yifeng – Swords of Legends | **Michelle Chen** – **The Romance of the Condor Heroes**; Tiffany Tang – Perfect Couple; Yang Rong – Cosmetology High; Yuan Shanshan – Palace 3: The Lost Daughter; Viann Zhang – The Investiture of the Gods |
| Best Actor (Revolution-Era Drama) | Best Actress (Revolution-Era Drama) |
| **Yang Shuo** – **Sword Family Women**; Zhu Yawen – Red Sorghum; Zhang Jiayi – Forty Nine Days: Fiesta; Gong Hanlin – The Choice Before Dawn; Chen Sicheng – God of War | **Joe Chen** – **Cruel Romance**; Tiffany Tang – Legend of Fragrance; Yan Ni – Wang Dahua Revolutionary Career; Hai Qing – The Legendary Sniper; Ning Jing – Me and My Amazing Grandma |
| Best Actor (Contemporary Drama) | Best Actress (Contemporary Drama) |
| **Yu Hewei** – **The Next Station**; Ren Zhong – Don't Call Me Brother; Wang Lei – The Ordinary World; Wu Xiubo – Divorce Lawyers; Huang Lei – Honey Bee Man | **Tiffany Tang** – **My Sunshine**; Song Jia – Hey Daddy; Chen Shu – Honey Bee Man; Zheng Shuang – The Cage of Love; Ma Su – Under One Roof |
| Best Supporting Actor | Best Supporting Actress |
| **Guo Kaimin** – **Tiger Mom**; Huang Xuan – Red Sorghum; Wei Zi – Generation of Dignity; Feng Yuanzheng – The Chinese Farmers; Han Tongsheng – May December Love | **Jiang Shuying** – **A Servant Of Two Masters**; Faye Yu – May December Love; Zhang Ting – The Empress of China; Sheren Tang – Cosmetology High; Qin Hailu – Red Sorghum |
| Best Newcomer | Best Producer |
| **Yang Le** – **May December Love**; Huang Xuan – Red Sorghum; William Chan – Swords of Legends; Guan Xiaotong – A Servant Of Two Masters; Zhang Meng – Divorce Lawyers | **Huang Lan, Jing Lei** – **Tiger Mom**; Hou Hongliang – All Quiet in Peking; Cao Ping – Red Sorghum; Fan Bingbing – The Empress of China; Ma Baohua – A Civic Yuppie in Countryside |
| Top 10 Dramas | Audience's Favorite Stars |
| **Red Sorghum**; The Empress of China; Tiger Mom; A Servant Of Two Masters; May December Love; All Quiet in Peking; A Civic Yuppie in Countryside; Honey Bee Man; Divorce Lawyers; Deng Xiaoping at History's Crossroads | Zhou Xun; Tong Dawei; Li Fei'er; Ron Ng; Gong Hanlin; Dong Weijia |
Best Production Company
**New Classics Media**; Shandong Television Media Group; Zhejiang Huace Film & TV; Shanghai SMG Pictures; Perfect World
