= Fall in Love Like a Star =

- Theatrical release poster
- Chinese: 怦然星动
- Directed by: Tony Chan
- Starring: Yang Mi; Li Yifeng
- Production companies: H&R Century Pictures; Haining Jiaxing Tianxia Entertainment; Beijing Enlight Media
- Distributed by: Bravo Entertainment
- Release date: December 3, 2015
- Running time: 98 minutes
- Country: China
- Language: Mandarin
- Box office: US$23.5 million

Fall in Love Like a Star (Chinese: 怦然星动) is a 2015 Chinese romantic drama film directed by Tony Chan, starring Yang Mi and Li Yifeng. It was released on December 3, 2015.

== Plot ==
Su Xingyu, an instrument tuner for a rock band, meets and falls in love with the band's assistant Tian Xin. The two daydream about becoming a famous singer-songwriter and artist manager, respectively. After Xingyu goes overseas to further his studies, Tian Xin decides to break up with him so that he could concentrate on his career.

Five years has passed and Su Xingyu is a popular music artist. He gets into an argument with his manager, Mei, and ends up selecting Tian Xin as his new manager. When asked why he chose her, he simply responds by saying that he wants to torture her.

One night, Tian Xin is out with friends to celebrate one of her friend's birthday. There, she gets drunk and texts Su Xingyu that she still loves him. The next day, Xingyu demands that she explain herself to him. During a shoot gone wrong, Xingyu and Tian get stuck in a hot air balloon. When they land, Tian explains to him why she dumped him. She said that all his money was spent on long distance phone calls and that she didn't want him to suffer anymore. Xingyu suggests that they rekindle their relationship. Although Tian is hesitant, she reluctantly agrees. There, they stargaze and compare themselves to stars.

Some time later, Xingyu and Tian are thriving as manager and artist. Xingyu and Tian decide to have sex and a paparazzo catches them on camera through an open window. When the paparazzo gives the picture to Mei, she goes to Tian and angrily berates her. Tian, thinking that she isn't good enough for Xingyu, leaves him. Xingyu searches for her, only to find an old bracelet of Tian's, that he had gifted to her years ago, and a painting of the both of them stargazing.

After the release of Xingyu's album, "Missing You", he is nominated for an award. Tian attends the awards ceremony and watches from afar as he wins. Xingyu gives his speech and talks about Tian. He says that he doesn't know where she is or why she left him again, but he hopes that she will return. At the end of his speech, he gives her a place to meet up with him, saying that he'll be waiting for her. After that, he and Tian run off to the place and happily kiss each other.

Right before the credits roll, Tian and Xingyu are bickering behind a closed door. They both have decided to go to a party and show up in their outfits from Swords of Legends as Baili Tusu and Feng Qingxue, thinking that the party was a costume one.

== Cast ==
- Yang Mi as Tian Xin

A hard working agent who was in a previous relationship with Su Xingyu. She ends up breaking up with him due to the fact that he was spending all his money on overseas phone calls. She still has feelings for him.

- Li Yifeng as Su Xingyu

A successful musician who harbors hatred and love towards Tian Xin. He is hooked on making her suffer, even though he still has feelings for her.

- Leon Zhang as Gao Mang

Gao Mang is an upcoming musician who is rivalling Su Xingyu in fame.

- Dilraba Dilmurat as May Li

A celebrity who is in love with Xingyu. She ends up eventually dating Gao Mang.

- Chen Shu as Mei Jie

An agent who manages Xingyu and eventually Gao Mang. Although she doesn't hate Tian Xin, she believes that Tian Xin is a bad influence on Xingyu.

- David Wang as Chen Xuan

A chef who is in love with Tian Xin.

- Jin Shijia as Bing
- Tiger Hu as Song Ming

== Reception ==
Maggie Lee of Variety called the plot a "mediocre pic" that was reduced to an unrealistic romantic dross.
