= China TV Drama Awards =

Chinese television awards ceremony

- Country: China
- Presented by: Anhui Television
- First award: 2008

The China TV Drama Awards (国剧盛典), also known as the Domestic TV Series Ceremony, is an award show presented annually on Anhui Television to award excellence in Chinese television.

== Categories ==
=== Main awards ===
- Top Ten Television Series (十佳电视剧)
- Best Web Series (年度最佳网络剧) (Note: from 2014 onwards)
- Best Director (最佳导演) (Note: Other titles: "Audience's Favorite Director 观众喜爱的导演 " (2013) or "Director of the Year 年度導演" (2016))
- Best Screenwriter (最佳编剧) (Note: Also referred to as "Audience's Favorite Screenwriter 观众喜爱的编剧" (2013))
- Best Producer (最佳制片人) (Note: Other titles: "Golden Producer of the Year 年度金牌制作人" (2015))
- Best Actor (最佳男演员) (Note: Other titles: " Audience's Favorite Actor 观众喜爱的男演员" (2013))
- Best Actress (最佳女演员) (Note: Other titles: " Audience's Favorite Actress 观众喜爱的女演员" (2013))
- Best Supporting Actor (最佳男配角) (Note: Other titles: "Audience's Favorite Supporting Actor 观众喜爱的男配角" (2013))
- Best Supporting Actress (最佳女配角) (Note: Other titles: "Audience's Favorite Supporting Actress 观众喜爱的女配角" (2013))
- Best New Actor (最佳新人男演员) (Note: Other titles: "Audience's Favorite New Actor 观众喜爱的新人男演员" (2013-2014))
- Best New Actress (最佳新人女演员) (Note: Other titles: "Audience's Favorite New Actress 观众喜爱的新人女演" (2013-2014))
- Best Character (最佳角色大奖) (Note: Other titles: "Audience's Favorite Character 观众喜爱的角色人物" (2013-2015) or "Actor who interpreted Audience's Favorite Characters 塑造觀眾喜愛角色演員" (2016))
- Best Original Soundtrack (最佳電視劇歌曲) (Note: Also referred to as "Audience's Favorite Soundtrack (2013-2014))
- Lifetime Achievement Award (终身成就奖) (Note: Other titles: "Spirit of a Local Production Craftsman 國劇匠人精神" (2016)))

=== Popularity Awards ===
- Most Popular Television Series (網絡最受歡迎電視劇)
- Most Popular Actor (最受欢迎演员) (Note: from 2014 onwards))
- Most Popular Actor/Actress (Mainland) (網絡最受歡迎男/女演員 - 內地) (Note: Other titles: "Mainland Popular Actor/Actress 内地人气男/女演員" (2013-2014), "Actor/Actress Deeply Loved By the Audience 深受觀眾歡迎演員" (2016))
- Most Popular Actor/Actress (Hong Kong/Taiwan) (網絡最受歡迎男/女演員 - 港台) (Note: Other titles: Hong Kong/Taiwan Popular Actor/Actress 港台人气男/女演員" (2013-2014))
- Most Popular Foreign Actor (網絡最受歡迎海外演員) (Note: Other title: "Overseas Popularity Actor 海外人气演员" (2013))
- Popular Actor Award (最具人气演员)
- Most Popular On-screen Couple (網絡最受歡迎螢幕情侶) (Note: Other titles: "Sweet On-screen Couple 甜蜜屏幕情侣" (2013), "On-screen Couple 荧幕情侣" (2016))
- Most Popular All-Rounded Artist (網絡最受歡迎全能藝人) (Note: Other title: "All-Rounded Artist 全能艺人" (2013))

=== Misc Awards ===
- Artist of the Year (年度藝人) (Note: 2016 onwards)
- Television Figure of the Year (电视剧年度人物) (Note: Other title: "Figure of the Year 年度人物" (2014))
- Influential Figure of the Year (风云人物) (Note: Other title: "Influential Grand Award 风云大奖" (2012))
- Media Recommended Actor (媒体特别推荐演员) (Note: Other title: "Media Recommendation Grand Award 媒体特别推荐大奖" (2011))
- Role Model Award (榜样大奖)
- Outstanding Contribution Figure (杰出贡献人物) (Note: Other titles: "Outstanding Contribution Grand Award 杰出贡献大奖", "Outstanding Actor 杰出演員" (2016))
- Special Contribution Award (特别贡献奖) (Note: Other title: "Ratings Special Contribution Award 收視特别贡献奖" (2014))
- Most Appealing Actor (最具号召力演员) (Note: Other titles: "Most Appealing Young Actor 极具青春号召力演员" (2013-2014), "Actor with Most Ratings Appeal 最具收视号召力演员 (2015)", "Actor with the Most Media Appeal of the Year 年度全媒体号召力人物" "Appealing Young Actor 青春号召力演员" (2016))
- Most Influential Actor (最具影响力演员) (Note: Other titles: "Actor with Most Influence 极具影响力人物" (2013), "Influential Actor 影响力演员" (2016))
- Most Commercially Valuable Actor (极具商业价值演员) (Note: from 2013 onwards)
- Excellent Actor (卓越演員) (Note: Other title: "Actor with Excellent Acting Skills 演技卓越演員" (2016))
- Talented Actor (演技實力派演員) (Note: Other title: "Talented Actor 實力演员" (2016))
- Rising Actor (飞跃演员) (Note: Other title: "Actor with Rising Acting Skills 演技飞跃演员" (2014))
- Acting Idol Award (演艺偶像奖) (Note: Other titles: "Young Acting Idol 演艺青年偶像" (2014), "Most Popular Acting Idol 最受欢迎演艺偶像" (2015))
- Most Promising Actor (极具潜质演员)
- Best Breakthrough Spirit (最具突破精神演员) (Note: Other titles: "Actor with Most Breakthrough Spirit 极具精神突破演员" (2013), "Actor with Breakthrough Spirit 具有突破精神演员" (2014))
- Best On-screen Performance (最具螢屏表現力演員) (Note: from 2014 onwards; Other title: "Performance Award 表現力演员" (2016))
- Most Anticipated Actor by the Media (年度电视剧媒体最期待演员) (Note: from 2014 onwards)
- Actor with the Most Media Influence (最具全媒体影响力演员) (Note: from 2014 onwards; Other title: "Actor with the Most New Media Influence 最具新媒体影响力演员" (2014))
- Most Talked About Actor (年度最受关注演员) (Note: from 2015 onwards)
- Most Charismatic Actor On the Screen (熒屏魅力演員) (Note: from 2016 onwards)

=== Discontinued Awards ===
- Best Long Drama (最佳长剧奖)
- Best Foreign Drama (最佳海外引进剧)
- Best Quality Drama (最具品質電視劇)
- Audience's Favorite OST Singer (觀眾最喜愛的影視歌曲演唱人)
- Charity Award (公益慈善大奖)

== Main awards ==
=== Top Ten Television Series ===
| Year | Winners | | | | | | | | | |
| Year | 1 | 2 | 3 | 3 | 5 | 6 | 7 | 8 | 9 | 10 |
|---|---|---|---|---|---|---|---|---|---|---|
| 2010 | Three Kingdoms | New An Family | A Beautiful Daughter-in-law Era | Before Dawn | Brothers' Happiness | Marriage Battle | Snow Leopard | Cellphone | Iron Pear | Go Yi Yi Go |
| 2011 | All Men Are Brothers | Designation Forever | Forever Loyal | Borrow Gun | The Pursuit of Love | Blood Sophora Japonica | Beauty's Rival in Palace | Naked Wedding | Men | Li Chuntian's Spring |
| 2012 | Empresses in the Palace | Mother, Mother | Beijing Love Story | The Brink | We Love You, Mr. Jin | Husband and Wife | Qing Mang | Angel Heart | Beijing Youth | The Bachelor |
| 2013 | Dog Stick | Hot Mom! | Matched For Marriage | Little Daddy | We Get Married | Prince of Lan Ling | To Elderly with Love | The Patriot Yue Fei | Legend of Lu Zhen | A Unique Militiaman |
| 2014 | Deng Xiaoping at History's Crossroads | All Quiet in Peking | Red Sorghum | Life's Revelations | Divorce Lawyers | May December Love | iPartment 4 | The Young Doctor | Honey Bee Man | Obstetrician |
| 2015 | Nirvana in Fire | The Journey of Flower | You Are My Sisters | Good Times | Swan Dive for Love | The Disguiser | Years Such As Gold | Ordinary World | Diamond Lover | The Empress of China |
| 2016 | Hai Tang Yi Jiu | The Grand Join Forces | Decoded | Remembering Lichuan | The Interpreter | Sisters | Chinese Style Relationship | Keep the Marriage as Jade | —N/a | —N/a |

=== Best Web Series ===
| Year | Winner |
|---|---|
| 2014 | Surprise |
| 2015 | The Lost Tomb |

=== Best Director ===
| Year | Winner | Nominated work |
|---|---|---|
| 2010 | Gao Xixi | Three Kingdoms |
| 2011 | Xu Jizhou | Forever Designated |
| 2012 | Zheng Xiaolong | Empresses in the Palace |
| 2013 | Wen Zhang | Little Daddy |
| 2014 | Kong Sheng, Li Xue | All Quiet in Peking |
| 2015 | Kong Sheng, Li Xue | Nirvana in Fire |
| 2016 | Zheng Xiaolong | The Legend of Mi Yue |

=== Best Screenwriter ===
| Year | Winner | Nominated work |
|---|---|---|
| 2010 | Zhu Sujin | Three Kingdoms |
| 2011 | Wang Liping | Two City One Family |
| 2011 | Shi Ling | Forever Loyal |
| 2012 | Quan Yongxian | The Brink |
| 2013 | Guo Jingyu, Dai Junqing, Xiao Shaoquan | Dog Stick |
| 2014 | Liu Heping | All Quiet in Peking |
| 2015 | Wang Liping | Good Times |
| 2016 | —N/a | —N/a |

=== Best Producer ===
| Year | Winner | Nominated work |
|---|---|---|
| 2010 | Li Xiaowan | The Dream of Red Mansions |
| 2011 | Ruby Lin | The Glamorous Imperial Concubine |
| 2012 | Angie Chai | Xiao Ju De Chun Tian |
| 2013 | —N/a | —N/a |
| 2014 | —N/a | —N/a |
| 2015 | Nicky Wu | —N/a |
| 2016 | —N/a | —N/a |

=== Best Actor ===
| Year | Winner | Nominated work |
|---|---|---|
| 2010 | Lin Yongjan | Before Dawn |
| 2011 | Wen Zhang | Naked Wedding |
| 2012 | Zhang Jiayi | The Brink |
| 2013 | Wei Zi | Dog Stick |
| 2014 | Zhang Jiayi | A Servant Of Two Masters |
| 2015 | Hu Ge | Nirvana in Fire |
| 2016 | —N/a | —N/a |

=== Best Actress ===
| Year | Winner | Nominated work |
|---|---|---|
| 2010 | Hai Qing | A Beautiful Daughter-in-law Era |
| 2011 | Ma Yili | Two City One Family |
| 2012 | Sun Li | Empresses in the Palace |
| 2013 | Liu Tao | To Elderly with Love |
| 2014 | Zhou Xun | Red Sorghum |
| 2015 | Fan Bingbing | The Empress of China |
| 2016 | —N/a | —N/a |

=== Best Supporting Actor ===
| Year | Winner | Nominated work |
|---|---|---|
| 2010 | Fan Ming | Cell Phone |
| 2011 | Wang Xiaoli | Countryside Love |
| 2012 | Du Yuan | We Love You, Mr. Jin |
| 2013 | Wang Zhifei | Da Zhai Men 1912 |
| 2014 | Zu Feng | All Quiet in Peking |
| 2015 | Victor Huang | Nirvana in Fire |
| 2016 | —N/a | —N/a |

=== Best Supporting Actress ===
| Year | Winner | Nominated work |
|---|---|---|
| 2010 | Bai Han | A Beautiful Daughter-in-law Era |
| 2011 | Zhang Kaili | Naked Wedding |
| 2012 | Jiang Xin | Empresses in the Palace |
| 2013 | Yan Xuejing | Three Kingdoms of the Sisters-in-law |
| 2014 | Yang Kun | Life Revelations |
| 2015 | Dong Jie | Tiger Mom |
| 2016 | —N/a | —N/a |

=== Best New Actor ===
| Year | Winner | Nominated work |
|---|---|---|
| 2010 | Ren Zhong | Marriage Battle |
| 2011 | Li Yifeng | Sunny Happiness |
| 2012 | Li Dongxue | Empresses in the Palace |
| 2013 | Liu Huan | Little Daddy |
| 2014 | Yang Le | May December Love |
| 2015 | Ma Ke | The Journey of Flower |
| 2016 | —N/a | —N/a |

=== Best New Actress ===
| Year | Winner | Nominated work |
|---|---|---|
| 2010 | Jiang Mengjie | The Dream of Red Mansions |
| 2011 | Bobo Gan | All Men Are Brothers |
| 2012 | Victoria Song | When Love Walked In |
| 2013 | Zhao Liying | Legend of Lu Zhen |
| 2014 | Guan Xiaotong | A Servant of Two Masters |
| 2015 | Dilraba Dilmurat | Diamond Lover |
| 2016 | —N/a | —N/a |

=== Best Character ===
| Year | Winner (Male) | Nominated work | Winner (Female) | Nominated work |
|---|---|---|---|---|
| 2010 | Wei Zi | Iron Pear | Chen Shu | Iron Pear |
| 2011 | Zhang Hanyu | All Men Are Brothers | Ning Jing | Hong Huai Hua |
| 2012 | Xu Zheng | The Bachelor | Yuan Li | Mother, Mother |
| 2013 | Yu Yu | Dog Stick | Jessica Hsuan | The War of Beauties |
| 2014 | Ma Shaohua | Deng Xiaoping at History's Crossroads | Zhang Xinyi | The River Children |
| 2015 | Wallace Huo | The Journey of Flower | Tiffany Tang | Diamond Lover |
| 2016 | Yin Zheng | Sparrow | Kan Qingzi | Sparrow |

=== Best Original Soundtrack ===
| Year | Winner | Singer | Nominated work |
|---|---|---|---|
| 2010 | 这一生还是你最好 | Valen Hsu | Golden Wedding OST |
| 2011 | 兄弟无数 | Jing Gangshan | All Men Are Brothers OST |
| 2012 | 不弃不离 | Yu Quan | AA Lifestyle OST |
| 2013 | 相见不如怀念 | Fan Fan | Little Daddy OST |
| 2014 | 剑心 | Jason Zhang | Swords of Legends OST |
| 2015 | —N/a | —N/a | —N/a |
| 2016 | —N/a | —N/a | —N/a |

=== Lifetime Achievement Award ===
| Year | Winner |
|---|---|
| 2010 | Li Xuejian |
| 2011 | Lei Kesheng |
| 2012 | Siqin Gaowa |
| 2013 | Liu Xiaoqing |
| 2014 | Li Baotian |
| 2015 | Zhang Shaohua |
| 2016 | You Benchang |

== Popularity Award ==
=== Most Popular Television Series ===
| Year | Mainland China | Hong Kong/Taiwan |
|---|---|---|
| 2010 | Three Kingdoms | Summer's Desire |
| 2011 | Scarlet Heart | —N/a |
| 2012 | iPartment 3 | —N/a |
| 2013 | —N/a | —N/a |
| 2014 | Swords of Legends | —N/a |
| 2015 | —N/a | —N/a |
| 2016 | —N/a | —N/a |

=== Most Popular Actor ===
| Year | Winner | Nominated work |
|---|---|---|
| 2014 | Hu Ge | Life Revelations; Sound of the Desert |
| 2015 | Wallace Huo | —N/a |

=== Most Popular Actor/Actress (Mainland China) ===
| Year | Winner (Male) | Nominated work | Winner (Female) | Nominated work |
|---|---|---|---|---|
| 2010 | Huang Haibo | A Beautiful Daughter-in-law Era | Yin Tao | The Firmament of the Pleiades |
| 2011 | Hu Ge | Unbeatable | Tiffany Tang | My Daughter |
| 2012 | Du Chun | Beijing Youth | Yao Di | Beijing Youth |
| 2013 | Luo Jin | Agent X | Qi Wei | Love Destiny |
| 2014 | Li Yifeng | Swords of Legends | Zhao Liying | Boss & Me |
| 2015 | Wang Kai | Nirvana in Fire | —N/a | —N/a |
| 2016 | Luo Jin | The Princess Weiyoung | Tiffany Tang | The Princess Weiyoung |

=== Most Popular Actor/Actress (Hong Kong/Taiwan) ===
| Year | Winner (Male) | Nominated work | Winner (Female) | Nominated work |
|---|---|---|---|---|
| 2010 | —N/a | —N/a | Ruby Lin | Beauty's Rival in Palace |
| 2011 | Kevin Cheng | Ghetto Justice | Sheren Tang | No Regrets |
| 2012 | Chen Bolin | In Time with You | Ada Choi | Empresses in the Palace |
| 2013 | Wallace Chung | Best Time | Joe Chen | Swordsman |
| 2014 | Wallace Huo | Perfect Couple | —N/a | —N/a |
| 2015 | Hawick Lau | You Are My Sisters | —N/a | —N/a |
| 2016 | —N/a | —N/a | —N/a | —N/a |

=== Most Popular Actor (Foreign) ===
| Year | Winner (Male) | Nominated work | Winner (Female) | Nominated work |
|---|---|---|---|---|
| 2010 | —N/a | —N/a | —N/a | —N/a |
| 2011 | Pong | Sea of Greed | Han Chae-young | A Man Called God |
| 2012 | Pong | —N/a | Irina Kaptelova | —N/a |
| 2013 | Kim Woo-bin | The Heirs | Park Shin-hye | The Heirs |
| 2014 | —N/a | —N/a | —N/a | —N/a |
| 2015 | Ji Chang-wook | Healer | —N/a | —N/a |
| 2016 | —N/a | —N/a | —N/a | —N/a |

=== Popular Actor/Actress Award ===
| Year | Winner | Nominated work |
|---|---|---|
| 2010 | Wu Xiubo | Before Dawn |
| 2011 | Yang Mi | —N/a |
| 2012 | Hu Ge | —N/a |
| 2012 | Liu Shishi | —N/a |
| 2013 | —N/a | —N/a |
| 2014 | —N/a | —N/a |
| 2015 | —N/a | —N/a |
| 2016 | Zhang Ruoyun | Sparrow |
| 2016 | Victoria Song | Ice Fantasy |

=== Most Popular On-screen Couple ===
| Year | Winner | Nominated work |
|---|---|---|
| 2010 | Ling Xiaosu & Yao Chen | Days with the Air Hostess |
| 2011 | Wallace Chung & Li Xiaoran | Too Late to Say Loving You |
| 2012 | Luo Jin & Miao Pu | Mu Guiying Takes Command |
| 2013 | Yan Yikuan & Du Ruoxi | Girlfriend's Lover |
| 2014 | Wallace Huo & Tiffany Tang | Perfect Couple |
| 2015 | —N/a | —N/a |
| 2016 | Yan Yikuan & Du Ruoxi | Sisters |

=== Most Popular All-Rounded Artist ===
| Year | Winner |
|---|---|
| 2010 | —N/a |
| 2011 | Ming Dao |
| 2012 | Wallace Chung |
| 2012 | Yang Mi |
| 2013 | Jimmy Lin |
| 2014 | William Chan (Swords of Legends) |
| 2015 | Aarif Rahman |
| 2016 | —N/a |

== Misc Awards ==
=== Television Figure of the Year ===
| Year | Winner (Male) | Nominated work | Winner (Female) | Nominated work |
|---|---|---|---|---|
| 2010 | Chen Jianbin | Three Kingdoms | Yan Ni | For Spring |
| 2011 | Huang Zhizhou | —N/a | —N/a | —N/a |
| 2012 | Li Chen | —N/a | Ma Su | —N/a |
| 2013 | Zhang Yi | —N/a | Yu Mingjia | —N/a |
| 2014 | Wallace Chung | The Stand-In | Chen Shu | Honey Bee Man |

=== Artist of the Year ===
| Year | Winner | Work |
|---|---|---|
| 2016 | Li Yifeng | Sparrow |

=== Influential Figure of the Year ===
| Year | Winner | Nominated work |
|---|---|---|
| 2010 | Fan Wei | Brothers' Happiness |
| 2011 | —N/a | —N/a |
| 2012 | Chen Baoguo | —N/a |
| 2013 | Wallace Chung | —N/a |
| 2014 | —N/a | —N/a |
| 2015 | Fan Bingbing | —N/a |
| 2016 | —N/a | —N/a |

=== Role Model Award ===
| Year | Winner |
|---|---|
| 2010 | —N/a |
| 2011 | Huang Haibo |
| 2012 | —N/a |
| 2013 | —N/a |
| 2014 | —N/a |
| 2015 | Nicky Wu |
| 2016 | —N/a |

=== Media Recommendation Award ===
| Year | Winner |
|---|---|
| 2010 | —N/a |
| 2011 | Liu Shishi |
| 2012 | Jia Nailiang (as actor) |
| 2012 | Tiffany Tang (as actor) |
| 2012 | Chen Sicheng (as director) |
| 2013 | —N/a |
| 2014 | Wallace Chung |
| 2015 | Yuan Hong |
| 2016 | —N/a |

=== Outstanding Contribution Figure ===
| Year | Winner | Nominated work |
|---|---|---|
| 2010 | —N/a | —N/a |
| 2011 | Zhang Guoli | —N/a |
| 2012 | —N/a | —N/a |
| 2013 | —N/a | —N/a |
| 2014 | Zheng Xiaolong | Red Sorghum |
| 2015 | Lin Yongjian | —N/a |
| 2016 | Chen Jianbin | Chinese Style Relationship |
| 2016 | Ma Yili | Chinese Style Relationship |

=== Special Contribution Award ===
| Year | Winner | Nominated work |
|---|---|---|
| 2010 | Lau Kong | A Beautiful Daughter-in-law Era; Before Dawn |
| 2011 | —N/a | —N/a |
| 2012 | —N/a | —N/a |
| 2013 | —N/a | —N/a |
| 2014 | Ni Dahong | —N/a |
| 2014 | Han Tongsheng | —N/a |
| 2015 | Li Chen | —N/a |
| 2015 | Zhao Liying | —N/a |
| 2015 | Hou Hongliang (Industry) | —N/a |
| 2016 | —N/a | —N/a |

=== Most Appealing Actor ===
| Year | Winner | Nominated work |
|---|---|---|
| 2010 | —N/a | |
| 2011 | Jimmy Lin | |
| 2012 | Wallace Chung | |
| 2012 | Ruby Lin | |
| 2013 | Chen Xiao | |
| 2014 | Michael Chen | iPartment 4 |
| 2015 | Zhao Liying (Ratings) | |
| 2015 | Tiffany Tang (Media) | |
| 2016 | Leo Wu | Nirvana in Fire |
| 2016 | Yang Zi | Ode to Joy |

=== Most Influential Actor ===
| Year | Winner | Nominated work |
|---|---|---|
| 2010 | —N/a | —N/a |
| 2011 | —N/a | —N/a |
| 2012 | Li Xiaolu | —N/a |
| 2013 | Nicky Wu | —N/a |
| 2014 | —N/a | —N/a |
| 2015 | Ma Yili | —N/a |
| 2016 | Nicky Wu | Legend of Zu Mountain |
| 2016 | Joe Chen | Stay with Me |

=== Most Commercially Valuable Actor ===
| Year | Winner | Nominated work |
|---|---|---|
| 2013 | Tiffany Tang | —N/a |
| 2014 | Li Yifeng | Swords of Legends |
| 2014 | Liu Shishi | Scarlet Heart 2 |
| 2015 | Joe Chen | —N/a |
| 2016 | —N/a | —N/a |

=== Excellent Actor ===
| Year | Winner | Nominated work |
|---|---|---|
| 2014 | Guo Jinglin | Life's Revelations |
| 2014 | Zhang Ruoyun | New Snow Leopard |
| 2015 | —N/a | —N/a |
| 2016 | Jiang Wenli | Keep The Marriage as Jade |

=== Talented Actor ===
| Year | Winner | Nominated work |
|---|---|---|
| 2010 | —N/a | —N/a |
| 2011 | —N/a | —N/a |
| 2012 | —N/a | —N/a |
| 2013 | Wang Kuirong | —N/a |
| 2013 | Zhang Kaili | —N/a |
| 2014 | Wang Qingxiang | —N/a |
| 2014 | Yu Feihong | —N/a |
| 2015 | Jin Dong | —N/a |
| 2015 | Ruby Lin | —N/a |
| 2016 | Huang Xuan | The Interpreter |

=== Rising Actor ===
| Year | Winner | Nominated work |
|---|---|---|
| 2010 | Li Guangjie | A Story of Lala's Promotion |
| 2011 | —N/a | —N/a |
| 2012 | Wang Lei | —N/a |
| 2012 | Zhang Xinyi | —N/a |
| 2013 | Lei Jiayin | —N/a |
| 2013 | Lou Yixiao | —N/a |
| 2014 | Huang Xuan | —N/a |
| 2014 | Chen Lina | —N/a |
| 2015 | Wang Kai | —N/a |
| 2016 | —N/a | —N/a |

=== Acting Idol Award ===
| Year | Winner |
|---|---|
| 2010 | —N/a |
| 2011 | Yan Yikuan |
| 2011 | Hawick Lau |
| 2011 | Luo Jin |
| 2012 | Qi Wei |
| 2012 | Liu Yan |
| 2013 | Li Yifeng |
| 2013 | Zhai Tianlin |
| 2013 | Da Zuo |
| 2014 | Wang Yang |
| 2014 | Zhang Jianing |
| 2015 | Du Chun |
| 2015 | Ma Su |
| 2016 | —N/a |

=== Most Promising Actor ===
| Year | Winner | Nominated work |
|---|---|---|
| 2010 | —N/a | —N/a |
| 2011 | —N/a | —N/a |
| 2012 | —N/a | —N/a |
| 2013 | Zhang Xiaolong | —N/a |
| 2014 | Sun Yizhou | Scarlet Heart 2 |
| 2014 | Li Qin | If I Love You |
| 2015 | Leo Wu | —N/a |
| 2016 | —N/a | —N/a |

=== Best Breakthrough Spirit ===
| Year | Winner | Nominated work |
|---|---|---|
| 2010 | —N/a | —N/a |
| 2011 | —N/a | —N/a |
| 2012 | Zhang Xiaolong | —N/a |
| 2012 | Wang Likun | —N/a |
| 2013 | Zhou Xiao'ou | —N/a |
| 2013 | Yue Lina | —N/a |
| 2014 | —N/a | —N/a |
| 2015 | Chen Long | —N/a |
| 2015 | Wang Xiaochen | —N/a |
| 2016 | Ma Su | The Legend of Mi Yue |

=== Best On-screen Performance ===
| Year | Winner | Nominated work |
|---|---|---|
| 2014 | Dong Yong | —N/a |
| 2014 | Zhang Xiaolong | —N/a |
| 2015 | —N/a | —N/a |
| 2016 | Chen Xuedong | Decoded |
| 2016 | Ying Er | Decoded |

=== Most Anticipated Actor by the Media ===
| Year | Winner | Nominated work |
|---|---|---|
| 2014 | William Chan | Swords of Legends |
| 2015 | Zhang Danfeng | —N/a |
| 2015 | Zhang Xiaolong | —N/a |

=== Actor with the Most Media Influence ===
| Year | Winner | Nominated work |
|---|---|---|
| 2014 | Nicky Wu | Scarlet Heart 2 |
| 2015 | Yang Yang | —N/a |

=== Most Talked About Actor ===
| Year | Winner |
|---|---|
| 2015 | Yang Yang |

=== Most Charismatic Screen Actor ===
| Year | Winner | Nominated work |
|---|---|---|
| 2016 | Vanness Wu | The Princess Weiyoung |
| 2016 | Mao Xiaotong | The Princess Weiyoung |

== Discontinued Awards ==
| Award | Winner | | | |
| Award | 2010 | 2011 | 2012 | 2013 |
|---|---|---|---|---|
| Best Long Drama | The Story of Parents' House 2 | My Daughter | —N/a | —N/a |
| Best Foreign Drama | Cupid's Love Ring | Dok Ruk Rim Taang | —N/a | —N/a |
| Best Quality Drama | —N/a | —N/a | The Sheng Tianmen Gate | —N/a |
| Audience's Favorite OST Singer | —N/a | —N/a | —N/a | Yao Beina |
| Charity Award | Sun Haiying; Lü Liping | —N/a | —N/a | —N/a |

== See also ==
- List of Asian television awards
