= Sunny Happiness =

2011 Chinese–Taiwanese television series

- Promotional poster
- Genre: Romance comedy
- Starring: Mike He; Janine Chang; Li Yifeng
- Countries of origin: China; Taiwan
- Original language: Mandarin
- No. of episodes: 25 (Mainland China); 16 (Taiwan)

Production
- Production locations: Taipei, Taiwan
- Production company: Anhui Golden Key Media Company

Original release
- Network: Anhui TV
- Release: 9 February – 5 March 2011
- Network: CTV
- Release: 13 February – 29 May 2011

Related
- Happy and Love Forever; Happy Michelin Kitchen

Sunny Happiness (Chinese: 幸福最晴天; pinyin: Xìngfú Zuì Qíngtiān) is a 2011 Chinese–Taiwanese co-produced television series starring Mike He and Janine Chang. The series was aired in China on Anhui TV and in Taiwan on CTV. The series is part of a Taiwanese drama trilogy which consists of Happy and Love Forever (2010) and Happy Michelin Kitchen (2012).

Li Yifeng won Best New Actor at the 3rd China TV Drama Awards.

== Synopsis ==
Xiang Yun Jie (Mike He) is a young, rich and divorced owner of an expanding company. Fang Yong Yong (Janine Chang) works as a housekeeper in a hotel owned by Xiang Yun Jie.

When Xiang Yun Jie decides to demolish an orphanage which is located on a very valuable piece of land to construct a new shopping mall, this orphanage is revealed to be Fang Yong Yong's old home. As Fang Yong Yong begins to work as a nanny as well, she finds out that Xiang Yun Jie is not the unmarried man, he pretends to be, because he actually has an eight-year-old child. However, Xiang Yun Jie did not know himself that he has a child, as he thought that his ex-wife had aborted their child. After discovering the truth, he wants to gain custody of the child, as his ex-wife refuses to let him spend time with his child.

At around the same time, Fang Yong Yong finds out that Xiang Yun Jie is responsible for the mall project. Because both are now in need of something, Xiang Yun Jie decides to give Fang Yong Yong the prospect of saving the orphanage in exchange for a fake marriage which has to last exactly one year (as he wants to gain custody, he can only do that by providing the child with a whole family).

== Cast ==
- Mike He as Xiang Yun Jie
- Janine Chang as Fang Yong Yong
- Li Yifeng as Xiang Yunchao
- Zhou Zi Han as Wang Lan
- Li Jin Ming as Kong Xin Jie
- Li Zhi Nan as Huang Si Han
- Zheng Wei as Wang Nian Jie
- Akio Chen as Fang Shen Fa
- Chen You Fang as Lin Gui Zhi
- Tang Ling as Jin Jing
- Jane Liao as Jin Wen
- Wu Zhen Ya as Ba Hu
- Zhang Qian as Xiang Jing Song
- Li Ping as Wang Ya Shu
- Ma Li Ou
- Kou Jia Rui as Ah Hao
- Ming Dao as Yin Ding Qiang (cameo)
- Annie Chen as Pan Xiao Nuo (cameo)
- Heaven Hai as Supervisor (cameo)

== Soundtrack ==
No.	Title	Singer	Length
1.	"A Little Gentle (有温柔)" (Opening theme song)	Claire Kuo
2.	"Sadness & Happiness (伤日快乐)" (Ending theme song)	Angela Chang
3.	"That Song (那首歌)"	Li Yifeng
4.	"Must Forget (忘记要忘记)"	Li Yifeng
5.	"You're My Miracle (你是我的奇迹)"	Li Zhinan
