= Sparrow (TV series) =

- Promotional poster
- Genre: Spy; War; Action thriller
- Written by: Hai Fei
- Directed by: Jin Chen; Zhou Yuandan
- Starring: Li Yifeng; Zhou Dongyu; Zhang Luyi; Zhang Ruoyun; Kan Qingzi; Yin Zheng
- Composer: S.E.N.S
- Country of origin: China
- Original language: Mandarin
- No. of episodes: 69

Production
- Executive producer: Zhong Conghai
- Production location: China
- Running time: 45 minutes
- Production companies: Mahayana Media; H&R Century Pictures; DOMYS Entertainment

Original release
- Network: Hunan TV
- Release: 5 September – 20 October 2016

Sparrow (Chinese: 麻雀; pinyin: Mājan; lit. 'Mahjong') is a 2016 Chinese television series based on the novel of the same name by Hai Fei (海飞), starring Li Yifeng as the title character. It aired on Hunan TV from 5 September to 20 October 2016.

== Plot ==
=== Synopsis ===
Set in the 1940s during Shanghai's revolutionary times, communist agent Chen Shen infiltrates the Japanese' base and adopts the code name "Sparrow". His mission is to obtain the "zero" intel, a secret plan that could destroy China. To do so, he becomes the assistant of Bi Zhongliang, the leader of the Special Operations Team under the Public Security Bureau.

In March 1940, the Collaborationist Wang Government was announced. The invading Japanese army hunted down Anti-Japanese in Shanghai, and the puppet government set up a "special operations department" headed by Bi Zhongliang (played by Zhang Luyi), a former National Revolutionary Army officer. Chen Shen ( Li Yifeng ), a CCP member codenamed "Sparrow" who has been lurking beside Bi Zhongliang, lost contact with the other communist agents.

In the perilous situation where the tiger is watching the wolf, Chen Shen pretends to be an unruly prodigal who gambles within the Shanghai bund and rolls among women, but in fact he has a firm belief and risks his life to rescue "prime minister" (played by Li Xiaoran) and other Anti-Japanese. Bi Zhongliang is cunning, and has suspicions about his "brother", the life-saving benefactor, Chen Shen. Because the "prime minister" is his brother's wife and sister-in-law, he desperately wants to rescue the prime minister, but things backfired. After the sacrifice of the prime minister, Chen Shen finally found a new "doctor" and was ordered to get the important battle plan of the Japanese army code-named "Return to Zero".

Chen Shen's former lover Xu Bicheng (played by Zhou Dongyu ), the two had a master-apprentice relationship at the Whampoa Military Academy. Xu and another Kuomintang intelligence officer, Tang Shanhai (played by Zhang Ruoyun), pretended to be husband and wife and sneaked into the special operations office. At this time, they also received information from the military. Ordered to get the return to zero plan, which is a plan by the Japanese army to lurk undercover in the military and the CCP, so that after the war ends, they can continue to serve the Japanese. Because of her personality, Xu Bicheng is not suitable for being a spy, and is always emotional, causing trouble to Chen Shen in many of her actions. Chen Shen, who is very clever, in the midst of a series of murders, cleverly exploits the subtle gaps in the Japanese, Wang Jingwei's puppet government and other factions, and won repeated victories, so that Bi Zhongliang and his superiors do not suspect that they are undercover. However, Su Sansheng (Yin Zheng), whom Juntong had betrayed, was given information from the Special Operations Department, Juntong's assassination team, the Hurricane Team, and almost all of Juntong's forces in Shanghai were wiped out. Su Sansheng loves Li Xiaonan (played by Kan Qingzi), but Li Xiaonan is in love with Chen Shen. Su Sansheng actively wants to kill Chen Shen, Tang Shanhai, and Xu Bicheng, believing that they are the undercover CCP "Sparrow" and the military undercover "Shudihuang". It also paid a huge price. Chen Shen finally succeeded in obtaining the "return to zero" plan, which was hidden in Bi Zhongliang's house. The ending is intriguing. Even though Xu Bicheng saved Chen Shen, she didn’t go to Yan’an in order to meet Chen Shen. However, Chen Shen didn’t meet Xu Bicheng in Shanghai because he faked death.

== Cast ==
=== Main ===
- Li Yifeng as Chen Shen

The titular protagonist. Born as an ordinary barber, Chen Shen is actually an uncovered agent for the Communist Party, codenamed "Sparrow". A charismatic, resilient and loyal man, with a deep-rooted fear of using firearms after inadvertently killing a child soldier many years ago. Due to his prolonged undercover mission, he has learned to disguise his emotions under a facade of carelessness and mockery.

- Zhou Dongyu as Xu Bicheng

An idealistic and temperamental girl who was formerly Chen Shen's student at the Republic of China Military Academy. She is in love with Chen Shen but has to put up a pretense as Tang Shanhai's wife to complete her mission as a nationalist spy.

- Zhang Luyi as Bi Zhongliang

Leader of the Special Operations Team under the Public Security Bureau. He was saved by Chen Shen during a war, and became blood brothers with him. After an incident where Chen Shen failed to capture "Prime Minister", he grows suspicious of Chen Shen's real identity. He is distrustful, manipulative and cruel, though he loves his wife dearly.

- Zhang Ruoyun as Tang Shanhai

A nationalist spy undercover in the Public Security Bureau, codenamed "Foxglove". Serious, calculating and always planning far into the future, he is in love with Bicheng, despite the fact that their marriage is only by name, and must constantly suppress his feelings to prevent them from compromising his mission. After he begins his mission, he starts to turn against Chen Shen.

- Kan Qingzi as Li Xiaonan

A beautiful and extroverted girl who appears to be bumbling, clumsy and ingenuous, but is a highly capable and composed agent codenamed "Doctor". She is in love with Chen Shen and would do anything to protect him. Her cover identity is a third-rate movie actress.

- Yin Zheng as Su Sanxing

A cold, ambitious and ruthless young man who betrayed the nationalists to become an officer of the Public Security Bureau. Underneath his megalomanic exterior, he has a twisted yearning for love and acceptance. He is infatuated with Li Xiaonan and sees her as the light of his life.

=== Supporting ===
- Li Xiaoran as Shen Chunxia

Nicknamed "Prime Minister", she is Chen Shen's only relative. A deeply loyal Communist agent who dies in order to save Chen Shen after being betrayed by a fellow comrade.

- Wang Jinsong as Li Moqun

Bi Zhongliang and Chen Shen's superior; Xu Bicheng's uncle. The ultimate mastermind who tries all sorts of methods to get rid of Bi Zhongliang.

- Liu Jiatong as Liu Meina

A hopeless romantic with a warm disposition who works as a bookkeeper under Bi Zhongliang at the Public Security Bureau. She is a close friend of Chen Shen, and she eventually falls in love with the "married" Tang Shanhai, who deceives her to achieve his goals.

- Wang Wanjuan as Liu Lanzhi

Bi Zhongliang's wife. A kind woman and a devout Christian who does not involve herself in her husband's plans.

- Shi Chao as Liu Erbao
- Yang Zheng as Bian Tou
- Chen Guanning as Wei Zhi
- Zhang Dabao as Wu Long

== Soundtrack ==
Sparrow OST
No.	Title	Singer	Length
1.	"Fly (飞)" (Ending theme song)	Han Lei
2.	"Ballet in the Wind (風中芭蕾)"	Yisa Yu
3.	"Astray (迷途)"	Zhang Ruoyun
4.	"Love in the Past (暖人)"	Ning Hengyu

== Reception ==
Sparrow received critical acclaim for its tightly-woven plot and acting performance, particularly Li Yifeng's. It became the highest rated spy drama to date with a peak rating of 2.46, and also the first spy drama to surpass 10 billion views.

=== Ratings ===
Ratings of Hunan Satellite TV Golden Eagle Solo Theater
Air date	Episode	CSM52 city network ratings			National Internet ratings		
Air date	Episode	Ratings (%)	Audience share (%)	Rank	Ratings (%)	Audience share (%)	Rank
September 5, 2016	1-2	0.946	2.94	4	1.03	3.29	1
September 6, 2016	3-4	0.939	2.815	4	1.14	3.6	1
September 7, 2016	5-6	1.411	4.527	1	1.53	5.09	1
September 8, 2016	7-8	1.193	3.896	1	1.43	4.77	1
September 9, 2016	9	1.081	3.49	2	1.21	3.85	1
September 10, 2016	10	1.068	3.42	1	1.32	4.27	1
September 11, 2016	11	1.07	3.44	2	1.03	3.61	1
September 12, 2016	12-13	1.242	3.999	1	1.35	4.44	1
September 13, 2016	14-15	1.367	4.408	1	1.36	4.48	1
September 14, 2016	16-17	1.606	4.766	1	1.8	5.41	1
September 15, 2016	18	1.049	3.419	1	1.34	4.23	1
September 16, 2016	19	1.191	3.68	2	1.21	3.78	1
September 17, 2016	20	1.175	3.612	1	1.16	3.62	1
September 18, 2016	21	1.279	3.867	2	1.31	4	1
September 19, 2016	22-23	1.656	5.093	1	1.68	5.5	1
September 20, 2016	24-25	1.624	5.058	1	1.62	5.29	1
September 21, 2016	26-27	1.487	4.665	1	1.59	5.23	1
September 22, 2016	28-29	1.715	5.352	1	1.63	5.38	1
September 23, 2016	30	1.357	4.319	1	1.37	4.25	1
September 24, 2016	31	1.317	4.093	1	1.6	4.87	1
September 25, 2016	32	1.487	4.429	1	1.65	4.95	1
September 26, 2016	33-34	1.685	5.267	1	1.78	5.78	1
September 27, 2016	35-36	1.845	5.745	1	1.98	6.34	1
September 28, 2016	37-38	1.736	5.401	1	1.77	5.65	1
September 29, 2016	39-40	1.939	5.967	1	1.98	6.37	1
September 30, 2016	41	1.608	4.955	1	1.77	5.25	1
October 1, 2016	42	1.623	5.391	1	2.08	6.36	1
October 2, 2016	43	1.727	5.552	1	2.16	6.64	1
October 3, 2016	44-45	2.182	6.959	1	2.52	8.12	1
October 4, 2016	46-47	2.144	6.648	1	2.51	7.86	1
October 5, 2016	48-49	2.199	6.705	1	2.35	7.45	1
October 6, 2016	50-51	2.205	6.242	1	2.3	7.04	1
October 7, 2016	52	1.74	4.922	1	1.89	5.5	1
October 8, 2016	53	1.787	5.256	1	1.89	5.63	1
October 9, 2016	54	2.106	6.157	1	2.04	6.1	1
October 10, 2016	55-56	2.253	6.875	1	2.17	7.09	1
October 11, 2016	57-58	2.118	6.362	1	2.27	7.31	1
October 12, 2016	59-60	2.417	7.443	1	2.31	7.63	1
October 13, 2016	61-62	2.438	7.453	1	2.49	8.03	1
October 14–16, 2016	Due to rebroadcast of Golden Eagle Festival, the broadcast was suspended for three days						
October 17, 2016	63-64	1.786	5.352	1	1.87	5.8	1
October 18, 2016	65-66	2.036	5.99	1	2.16	6.57	1
October 19, 2016	67-68	2.172	6.413	1	2.3	6.97	1
October 20, 2016	69	2.486	7.326	1	2.35	7.59	1
Average ratings		1.714	5.29	-	1.82	5.8	-

- Highest ratings are marked in red, lowest ratings are marked in blue

=== Awards and nominations ===
Award	Category	Nominee	Result
8th China TV Drama Awards	Top Ten Television Series	Sparrow	Won
8th China TV Drama Awards	Artist of the Year	Li Yifeng	Won
8th China TV Drama Awards	Popular Actor Award	Zhang Ruoyun	Won
8th China TV Drama Awards	Audience's Favorite Character	Yin Zheng, Kan Qingzi	Won
22nd Huading Awards	Best Actress (Revolutionary-Era)	Zhou Dongyu	Nominated
22nd Huading Awards	Best Supporting Actor	Zhang Luyi	Nominated
23rd Shanghai Television Festival	Best Supporting Actor	Zhang Luyi	Nominated
27th Zhejiang TV Peony Awards	Outstanding Television Series	Sparrow	Won
27th Zhejiang TV Peony Awards	Outstanding Actor	Li Yifeng	Won
4th Hengdian Film and TV Festival of China	Best Director	Jin Chen	Won
4th Hengdian Film and TV Festival of China	Best Supporting Actor	Wang Jinsong	Won
29th China TV Golden Eagle Award	Best Actor	Li Yifeng	Won
29th China TV Golden Eagle Award	Best Actress	Kan Qingzi	Nominated
12th China Golden Eagle TV Art Festival	Most Popular Actor	Li Yifeng	Won
