= Kan Qingzi =

Chinese actress (born 1988)

- 阚清子
- Born: April 15, 1988 (age 38); Harbin, Heilongjiang, China
- Other name: Adi
- Education: Beijing Film Academy
- Occupation: Actress
- Years active: 2008–present

Chinese name
- Traditional Chinese: 闞清子
- Simplified Chinese: 阚清子
Transcriptions
Standard Mandarin
- Hanyu Pinyin: Kàn Qīngzǐ

Kan Qingzi (Chinese: 阚清子, born 15 April 1988) is a Chinese actress. She graduated from the Beijing Film Academy.

== Career ==
In 2008, Kan made her acting debut in the television series The Dream of Red Mansions based on the novel by the same name by Cao Xueqin. She then portrayed young Empress Dowager Cixi in the 2010 historical drama The Firmament of the Pleiades .

In 2011, Kan became known to audience for her role in the historical romance comedy New My Fair Princess.

In 2013, Kan gained recognition for her performance as a black-bellied in the romance drama Shining Days.

In 2014, Kan starred in the period romance drama Moment in Peking based on Lin Yutang's novel of the same name. The same year, she played the lead role in the horror film Enchanted Doll.

In 2016, Kan starred in the spy drama Sparrow. The drama received critical acclaim for its performance and storyline, and became the highest rated war drama to date with a peak rating of 2.46. Kan was nominated for the Best Actress award at the China TV Golden Eagle Award for her performance.

In 2017, Kan starred in the youth romance drama Art in Love. The drama received positive reviews and had 4 billion views online. The same year, she featured in the fantasy epic drama Tribes and Empires: Storm of Prophecy as a princess; and played the female lead in the historical mystery drama Detective Dee.

In 2019, Kan starred in the spy drama Awakening of Insects, the sequel to Sparrow. The same year she starred in the romance anthology film Adoring directed by Xu Zheng.

== Filmography ==
=== Film ===
Year	English title	Chinese title	Role	Notes
2009	Beautiful Song of Taste	美味情歌	Ling Shan	
2011	Meet at the Hawthorn Tree	相约山楂树	Yi Fan	Short film
2012	Queen	女王	Qiao Min	
2012	Love On That Day	爱在那一天	Tang Guo	
2014	Enchanted Doll	怖偶	Xiao Hui	
2014	Xuanyuan Sword 6	轩辕剑六	Ji Ting	Short film
2015	Crazy New Year's Eve	一路惊喜	An Qi	
2016	Super Express	超级快递	Dan Dan	
2018	On Air	现场直播	Yang Yanyan	
2019	The Captain	中国机长		Cameo
2019	Adoring	宠爱	An Ying	
2021	The Pioneer	革命者	Li Dazhao	Main Role
2023	Heart's Motive	最后的真相	Sun Yu	

=== Television series ===
Year	English title	Chinese title	Role	Notes
2009	Mother and Wife	娘妻	Yang Jingyi	
2010	The Firmament of the Pleiades	苍穹之昴	Empress Dowager Cixi (young)	
2010	Unbeatable	无懈可击之美女如云	Ran Ran	
2010	The Dream of Red Mansions	红楼梦	She Yue	
2011	New My Fair Princess	新还珠格格	Xin Rong	
2012	The Watchful Sky	守望的天空	Lu Xiaolu	
2012	Love Under the Roof	爱在屋檐下	Hai Li	
2012	The Shengtianmen Gate	圣天门口	Xue Ning	
2013	Shining Days	璀璨人生	Ye Lin	
2013		郑氏十七房	Shankou Juzi	
2013	The Diamond's Dream	一克拉梦想	Gao Pei	
2013	Flowers of Pinellia Ternata	花开半夏	Lin Shan	
2013	Xue Ding Shan	薛丁山	Diao Yue'e	
2014	God of War	战神	Xing Zi	
2014	Moment in Peking	新京华烟云	Yao Mochou	
2015	Love Yunge from the Desert	大汉情缘之云中歌	Huo Lian'er	
2016	Sparrow	麻雀	Li Xiaonan	
2016	My Adorable Husband	我的蠢萌老公	Liang Duoduo	
2016	The Legend of Du Xinwu	杜心五传奇	Guan Xue	
2016	Demon Girl II	半妖倾城II	Yao Bitao	
2017	Special Beautiful Man	不一样的美男子II	Xiao Jin / Chu Xia	
2017	Midnight Diner	深夜食堂	Customer	Special appearance
2017	Detective Dee	通天狄仁杰	Murong Qing	
2017	Tribes and Empires: Storm of Prophecy	海上牧云记	Princess Ji	
2017	Art in Love	那刻的怦然心动	Li Chenyin	
2018	If Paris Downcast	如若巴黎不快乐	Yuan Manjun	
2018	The Great River	江河水	Lu Qian	
2019	Awakening of Insects	惊蛰	Xu Xiaowan	
2020	To Dear Myself	亲爱的自己	Li Zhizhi	
2020	Heroes in Harm's Way	最美逆行者		
2020	Together	在一起		
2020	Faith	信仰	Chen Yuting	
2021	Lady Tough	突如其来的假期	Liu Lian	
2022		沸腾人生	Shen Xia	
2024	Pegasus (TV version)	飞驰人生热爱篇	Li Xiaohe	
2024	Go East	四方馆	Yu Chihua	

=== Television show ===
Year	English title	Chinese title	Role	Notes
2017	The Inn	亲爱的·客栈	Cast member	Season 1
2019	The Inn	亲爱的·客栈	Cast member	Season 3

== Discography ==
Year	English title	Chinese title	Album	Notes
2019	"Adoring"	宠爱	Adoring OST	

== Awards and nominations ==
Year	Award	Category	Nominated work	Results	Ref.
2013	Life Style (精品购物指南) Magazine	Dreamer Award	—N/a	Won	
2014	Fashion New Power Awards	Trend Newcomer Award	—N/a	Won	
2016	Netease Crossover Awards	Best Icon Group (with Ji Lingchen)	—N/a	Won	
2016	8th China TV Drama Awards	Most Popular Character Portrayal	Sparrow	Won	
2018	29th China TV Golden Eagle Award	Best Actress	Sparrow	Nominated	
