= Nan sheng nü sheng xiang qian chong =

Chinese game show

- 男生女生向前冲
- Genre: Sports entertainment Comedy
- Presented by: Wang Xiaochuan (reg.); Wang Lele (reg.); Yu Sheng (reg.), etc.
- Country of origin: China
- No. of seasons: 5 (1 for Special Edition)

Production
- Running time: 100 minutes (including adverts)

Original release
- Network: Anhui Satellite Television
- Release: July 1, 2010 – present

Nan sheng nü sheng xiang qian chong (Pinyin, In Chinese: "男生女生向前冲", directly in English "Race Forward, Boys and Girls!") is a Chinese game show which is based on one of Endemol USA's best-selling game shows, Wipeout. This program has several changes to the original US settings. The latest season is finished on October 24, 2013.

== Basic facts ==
This show was premiered on July 1, 2010. Every summer the show is produced in Hefei, Anhui Province.

In the episodes there are usually 6 hosts, but sometimes 7 (especially in the Knockouts since Season 2). The hosts are selected from all channels of Anhui Television. There are 2 tracks with eight single obstacles (in Season 1, the number of obstacles was 6) in them, one is for male contestants, and the other one is for females. There are always 2 obstacles for all the players.

== Current obstacles ==
In the current episodes, the obstacles are listed as follows:

=== Women's track ===
==== Obstacle 1: "Mind the Steps" ("步步生花" in Chinese) ====
In this obstacle, contestant must step on the "Lotus" about 80 centimeters above the pool, one by one.

==== Obstacle 2: "The Trampolines" ("排山倒海" in Chinese) ====
There are two trampolines trembling above the pool. The contestant should walk through the quivering trampolines to finish the obstacle.

==== Obstacle 3: "The Rings" ("龙凤双环" in Chinese) ====
There are two podiums standing 2.5 meters above the pool. The contestant's job is going through the podiums to move on, just like triple long jump. Sounds easy? But there are two pointers with rings turning around above the podiums, so you must dodge them to move on.

==== Obstacle 4: "Turning Around" ("铁掌水上漂" in Chinese) ====
In this obstacle, there are three turntables turning in random directions. The contestant must race through the turntables. If someone lies on one single turntable for 3 seconds, the table will automatically turn faster so that she will be turned into the pool and out of the show.

==== Obstacle 5: "Big Moves" ("乾坤大挪移" in Chinese) ====
This obstacle may be the most difficult and dangerous one of the show's obstacles. The five platforms are turning in random directions and trembling. What's more, the "fists" on all the platforms are manufacturing interference to the contestants, so he or she must overcome the shock and struggle to go through this obstacle.

==== Obstacle 6: "Go Over the Beam"("弹指神通" in Chinese) ====
Just like the English obstacle name, the contestant must go over the 8-meter-long beam, dodging the turning "fingers" to win.

==== Obstacle 7: "Dodge It" ("飞檐走壁" in Chinese) ====
The contestant must dodge both the swinging W-sized stand and the 2 turning columns to deal with it.

==== Obstacle 8: "The Final Stage" ("登峰造极" in Chinese) ====
This is the last and the easiest one of the tracks, just move on to the 6-meter-high final stage to win.

=== Men's track ===
==== Obstacle 1: "Be Quick" ("箭步如飞" in Chinese) ====
This job may be easy, just switching yourself to the next obstacle. But the turning bars add the difficulty.

==== Obstacle 2: "The Flabellums" ("排山倒海" in Chinese) ====
Three flabellums in a row are turning in the same direction, contestant must go with the flabellums to deal with this obstacle.

==== Obstacle 3: "Rolling Down" ("腾云驾雾" in Chinese) ====
You must hug the cylinder on the huge stand and roll down beyond the pool.

==== Obstacle 4: "Turning Around" ====
It has the same setting as the women's track's Obstacle 4.

==== Obstacle 5: "Big Moves" ====
It has the same setting as the women's track's Obstacle 5.

==== Obstacle 6: "Deck the Balls" ("斗转星移" in Chinese) ====
This obstacle is the same as Wipeout's original obstacle, "The Big Balls". But there is a flatbed before the last big ball, and the second one and the last one are moving up and down.

==== Obstacle 7: "The Fists" ("重拳出击" in Chinese) ====
There are 5 "fists" trembling ahead, so the contestant must go over the fists to move on. You can deal with them one by one or race over them at once.

==== Obstacle 8: "The Final Stage" ====
It has the same setting as the women's track's Obstacle 8.

== Gameplay ==
=== Original game ===
Contestant must go over all the 8 single obstacles to win the prize. Unlike the US original version, if someone falls into the pool, termed "Wipeout!", he or she is eliminated. If he or she passes first 5 of the 8 obstacles, he or she will win a small prize instead.

The show uses a different mode to the US original version, the male players and female players play as single contestants, but work as two teams. Usually the people with the same gender play as the same team, but sometimes the team contains the same Family Name or the same hometown. The team with the smaller team to the other team will be punished by the presenters or the lifeguards.

=== Team relay ("队战接力" in Chinese) ===
This was introduced in season 5. The 8 contestants must work as a team, moving on and moving back. The track is divided into 4 parts, so there are 2 players in each part. If someone is wiped out, he or she is out of play.

The team leader, one of the hosts of the show, has an opportunity to save a contestant to play again. But the right can be used only once during the whole episode. If the two contestants of one part are both wiped out, the leader should decide whether he or she want to use it if the right is still available. If someone saved by his or her team leader is wiped out again, or both of the players are phased out, the game immediately ends and the team is automatically eliminated from the track.

The winner is the fastest team for both the two tracks, win the prize of CN¥20,000 in cash. If the winners of the two tracks are not the same team, each team will choose a contestant to play a one-on-one original game on the same track. The person who completes the most obstacles or finish the race with the shortest time wins the show, and the winning team wins the big cash.

=== The Knockouts ===
The Knockouts' rules are the same as the US original version's Wipeout Zone. The top 4 of each track are proceeded to the next round. In the Final, the winner wins a new car's 100,000-kilometer right to use, while the runners-up win home appliance or small cash prizes.

The person who is wiped out in the game or falls behind the 4th (sometimes the 3rd) is phased out immediately and win nothing. If he or she has finished the task, small prizes are awarded.

== The hosts ==
The hosts vary by episode. Unlike the original version which uses only three, this show uses 6 or 7 hosts, sometimes one on the backstage.

=== Current regular hosts ===
Although the show's hosts are varied well, some of them are regularly seen on the stage as follows:

- Wang Xiaochuan (王小川) – Born on October 12, 1981, from Lu'an, Anhui Province, usually hosts the women's track in the original games, the team relay episodes and the Knockouts.
- Wang Lele (王乐乐) – Born on October 3, 1985, from Hefei, Anhui Province, usually hosts the men's track in the original games, the team relay episodes' team leader and the Knockouts.
- Yu Sheng (余声) – Born on July 7, 1987, from Hefei, Anhui Province, rarely seen in the original game episodes, but she is usually the team leader of the team relay episodes, and always hosts the Knockouts.
- Song Qiuyi (宋秋熠) – Born on August 8, 1988, from Qingdao, Shandong Province, often hosts the original game episodes, and the Knockout's final stage.
- Sun Pengfei (孙鹏飞) – Born on August 14, 1988, from Yantai, Shandong Province, usually accompanies Song Qiuyi in some episodes, and plays a role in the team relay episodes.
- Ma Ying (马滢) – Born on November 4, 1978, from Hefei, Anhui Province, replaced Zhou Qun as one of the team relay episodes' hosts when Zhou had other things to do.

=== Guest hosts ===
There are some guest hosts which are rarely seen, such as Lu Yao, Bai Yu (one of the hosts who are often seen on the backstage), Chen Qi, Xu Yifei, and so on. They are all selected from all the television channels of Anhui TV Network.

== Top prize winners ==
Year	Date Aired	Track	Top Prize Winner	Winning Time
2012	November 11, 2012	Female	Zhu Jiajia (朱佳佳)	53 secs
2012	November 11, 2012	Male	Dong Hang (董航)	43 secs
2013	October 5, 2013	Female	Jia Lizhi (贾利芝)	1 min 28 secs
2013	October 5, 2013	Male	Xia Dengwen (夏邓文)	1 min 17 secs

Note: The 2010 and 2011 winners are unknown.

== Kids' Edition: "加油好baby" (Chinese) ==
There is a studio-based kids edition of this program called "加油好baby" (combined with Simplified Chinese and English), premiering on Anhui TV on January 18, 2014.

=== Format and settings ===
The contestants are families whose child is between 8 and 18 months.

The child must climb over the 12-meter long track in 90 seconds. He or she should get over the temptation zones, climb uphill and go over the obstacle. Failure to do these jobs in the allowed time, the father should stand in the "Punishment Zone" and be hit into the pool by the "Whale" at the end of the punishment zone.

Standing is prohibited in this game.

==== Prizes ====
Completing the temptation zone, the contestant will win a cooker worth CN¥ 800; finishing the uphill zone, an electric bicycle worth CN¥ 2,000 instead; crossing the finish line, the ultimate prize is an air conditioner worth CN¥ 3,500.
