= Animal World (film) =

- Theatrical release poster
- Traditional Chinese: 動物世界
- Simplified Chinese: 动物世界
- Hanyu Pinyin: Dòngwù Shìjiè
- Directed by: Han Yan
- Written by: Han Yan
- Based on: Kaiji by Nobuyuki Fukumoto
- Produced by: Chen Zhixi
- Starring: Li Yifeng; Michael Douglas; Zhou Dongyu
- Cinematography: Max Wang Da-yung
- Edited by: Yu Hongchao
- Music by: Neal Acree; Michael Tuller
- Production companies: Shanghai Ruyi Film Production Co., Ltd. Shanghai Pitaya Film Production Co., Ltd. Tencent Pictures; Jixiang Films; Fire Dragon Guo Pictures; Youth Enlight
- Distributed by: Enlight Pictures
- Release date: 29 June 2018 (China)
- Running time: 132 minutes
- Country: China
- Languages: Mandarin; English
- Budget: $28–43 million
- Box office: $77.4 million

Animal World (Chinese: 动物世界; pinyin: Dòngwù Shìjiè), also known as Animal World: Mr. Nobody, is a 2018 Chinese action-adventure film written and directed by Han Yan, and starring Li Yifeng, Michael Douglas and Zhou Dongyu. It is based on the manga Kaiji by Nobuyuki Fukumoto. Animal World is produced jointly by Shanghai Ruyi Film Production Co., Ltd., Shanghai Pitaya Film Production Co., Ltd., Tencent Pictures, Jixiang Films, Fire Dragon Guo Pictures, Youth Enlight and Enlight Pictures. The film premiered in China on June 29, 2018. Netflix has acquired the global digital rights to the film.

== Plot ==
Zheng Kaisi works a low-paying job and struggles to pay his mother's medical bills, relying on help from his nurse girlfriend, Liu Qing. At his friend Li Jun's behest, Kaisi mortgages his mother's apartment for a property scheme, but this backfires and leaves Kaisi with even greater debt.

Anderson, the owner of Kaisi's debt, invites Kaisi onto the ship Destiny, where passengers from all over the world play rock paper scissors for money. On the ship, players are given cards that correspond to rock, paper or scissors, and three stars, which are lost or gained when they lose or win matches. Players need to finish all their cards and have at least three stars in order to win and get off the ship. Kaisi is approached by fellow player Zhang Jingkun, who suggests they team up to tie all their matches so they can use all their cards and keep their stars, but Jingkun betrays him and leaves him with one star.

Kaisi teams up with Li Jun, who is also on the ship, and Fatty Meng, a fellow one-star player. Kaisi's talent with math and probability enables him to pick the right matches to play and help his teammates. Jingkun tempts Kaisi into abandoning his teammates but Kaisi refuses and reveals to all that Jingkun has marked the cards. Jingkun is left with one card, and no one but Kaisi is willing to play with him. Kaisi, wanting revenge by forcing Jingkun to slap himself, agrees to the match despite it allowing Jingkun to finish his cards. Kaisi loses all his stars and is taken to the "black room", where he waits for his teammates save him.

Li Jun and Fatty Meng follow Kaisi's strategy and win the stars they need. However, Fatty Meng convinces Li Jun to sell the stars instead so they can wipe out their personal debt. Kaisi manages to trick his way out of the black room, and takes the money earned by his former teammates to pay for the freedom of another player who was also betrayed.

Kaisi returns to Liu Qing a changed man. In an epilogue, Kaisi realizes that Anderson is the man who killed his father.

== Cast ==
- Li Yifeng as Zheng Kaisi
- Michael Douglas as Anderson
- Zhou Dongyu as Liu Qing
- Cao Bingkun as Li Jun
- Wang Ge as Meng Xiaopang
- Su Ke as Zhang Jingkun
- Chi Jia as Andō
- Zhang Junyi
- Li Yijuan as Zheng's mother.

== Production ==
Shooting began on February 24, 2017 and ended on August 15 of that same year. The film was shot on locations in Beijing, Tianjin, and Haikou.

== Soundtrack ==
No.	Title	Lyrics	Music	Singer(s)	Length
1.	"Weight of Growth (成长之重量)" (Ending theme)	Ronghao Li	Ronghao Li	Ronghao Li
2.	"Animal World (动物世界)" (Theme)	HY1116, Gan Shijia	Michael Tuller, Yu Fei, Annalise Morelli	Li Yuchun
3.	"Tail (尾巴)"	Tang Tian	Chen Xueran	Su Yunying

== Release ==
Animal World premiered at the 21st Shanghai International Film Festival, and opened in China on June 29, 2018.

=== Box office ===
The film topped the Chinese box office charts, dethroning Jurassic World: Fallen Kingdom. Animal World grossed CN¥510 million ($77.09 million) in China, $5,392 in New Zealand, and $358,225 in other territories, for a worldwide total gross of $77,403,617.

=== Critical reception ===
The film received mainly positive reviews.
