= Swords of Legends =

Chinese television series

- Swords of Legends poster
- Also known as: Legend of the Ancient Sword; Ancient Sword Fantasy
- Genre: Xianxia
- Created by: Shao Yun (original story)
- Based on: Gu Jian Qi Tan by Shanghai Aurogon
- Written by: Shao Sihan; Zhu Feng
- Directed by: Liang Shengquan; Huang Junwen
- Starring: Li Yifeng; Yang Mi; Qiao Zhenyu; Gillian Chung; Ma Tianyu; Zheng Shuang; William Chan
- Opening theme: Sword of Heart by Jason Zhang
- Ending theme: Distance by Yu Kewei; Lover's Song by Anson Hu
- Composers: Lo Chiyi; Zhou Zihua
- Country of origin: China
- Original language: Mandarin
- No. of episodes: 52

Production
- Executive producer: Zhao Yuna
- Producers: Zhong Junyan; Deng Xibin; Sun Lin
- Production locations: Hengdian World Studios; Xiandu
- Running time: 45 minutes
- Production companies: H&R Century Pictures Enlight Media; China International Television Corp

Original release
- Network: Hunan Television
- Release: 2 July – 25 September 2014

Swords of Legends (Chinese: 古剑奇谭; Chinese: 古劍奇譚; pinyin: Gu Jian Qi Tan) is a 2014 Chinese television series based on the role-playing video game Gu Jian Qi Tan developed by Shanghai Aurogon. It aired on Hunan TV from 2 July to 25 September 2014.

== Synopsis ==
Set in the Tang dynasty, a young boy named Han Yunxi (Li Yifeng) is infected by the aura of an ancient demonic sword known as the Sword of Burning Solitude. After his entire tribe was killed, he was brought to You Du by Sword Deity Yinzhen, where he meets Feng Qingxue (Yang Mi), who saved his life. Qingxue is part of the immortal order in You Du governed by Goddess Nuwa, who ensures that all ancient magical swords are properly sealed from the mortal realm. In an attempt to re-seal the ancient demonic sword, the people of You Du almost killed Yunxi, whose lifeforce is tied to the sword. To ensure his safety, Yunxi was brought to Tian Yong Cheng (Sword Guild City) by Ziyin, where he was given the name of Bali Tusu and trained as a swordsman together with his senior brother Ling Yue (William Chan).

Years later, while slaying demons, Tusu meets Ouyang Shaogong (Qiao Zhenyu), who is on a quest to find a jade ornament that will help him create a resurrection elixir to revive his lover, Princess Xunfang (Gillian Chung), who died in a flood. They are joined by Qingxue, who left You Du to search for Yunxi and her long-lost brother Feng Guangmo (Vengo Gao) who disappeared 11 years ago after the massacre of Wu Meng Valley; Fan Lansheng (Ma Tianyu), a young master who seeks to escape an arranged marriage and a fox-turned human Xiang Ling (Zheng Shuang) who is searching for her parents.

Eventually, Shao Gong succeeds in making the resurrection elixir and Tu Su's mother is awakened. Only then does Tu Su discover that Shao Gong has secretly endangered his mother. Shao Gong intends to use the jade ornament to control Tu Su and use him to assist his grand dynastic plans to rule the world.

== Cast ==
=== Main ===
- Li Yifeng as Baili Tusu (百里屠苏) / Han Yunxi (韩云溪)
  - Huang Tianqi as young Baili Tusu / Han Yunxi

Han Yunxi is the son of the Wu Meng valley's head shaman. After his whole tribe was massacred, the aura of the Sword of Burning Solitude was inserted into him to save his life, including one half of Crown Prince Changqin's celestial soul (Sword of Burning Solitude). He was then brought to Tian Yong City and trained as a sword immortal under the name of Bali Tusu. Three years later after an incident where he was accused of killing his fellow disciple, he left Tian Yong City to search for the murderer who killed his family and destroyed his village, thus beginning his journey.

- Yang Mi as Feng Qingxue (风晴雪)
  - Xu Shuo as young Feng Qingxue

The future head shaman of You Du, who shares the fate of sealing the evil aura of the Burning Sword. In order to search for her long-lost brother, she came to the mortal realm where she met and fell in love with Tusu, whom she once saved when they were young.

- Qiao Zhenyu as Ouyang Shao Gong (欧阳少恭)

An elder of the Qing Yun clan, who specializes in healing and medicine. Possessing only one half of Crown Prince Changqin's celestial soul (Pure Light Lyre [纯阳琴]), he wanders aimlessly in the mortal world for centuries until he meets Xun Fang, the princess of Peng Lai. However, a flood disaster which destroys Peng Lai occurred and separated the two. Having lost his one true love, Shao Gong would stop at nothing to get what he wants in order to get his revenge on Heaven, who he blames for Xun Fang's death.

- Gillian Chung as Xun Fang (巽芳) / Jin Niang (瑾娘)

The princess of Peng Lai. After she was being saved by Shao Gong from a pack of wolves, the two fell in love. Her hair simultaneously turned white as a result of using too much internal energy. Her face was destroyed because of the Heavenly Disaster and her voice became hoarse and rough. In order to preserve her youthful looks and unchanging beauty in Shao Gong's memory, Xun Fang disguised herself as Ji Tong and stayed by his side as his caretaker. Chung also simultaneously plays Jin Niang, who morphs her appearance to look like Xun Fang in order to gain Shao Gong's affections.

- Ma Tianyu as Fang Lansheng (方兰生) / Jin Lei (晋磊)

The adopted son of the Fang family, who aspires to become a sword immortal. His actual identity is Ling Yue's younger brother, who was separated from him when they were young. In order to escape his arranged marriage with Sun Yueyan, he decided to leave Qin Chuan and join Tusu and the rest on their journey. He loves Xiang Liang, but eventually gives up on her to realize his responsibilities after his sister's death. Ma also simultaneously plays Jin Lei, the previous reincarnation of Fang Lansheng.

- Zheng Shuang as Xiang Ling (襄铃)

A half-fox demon and half-human, who was saved by Tusu when he was young. In order to repay the favor, she decided to follow Tusu on his adventures while searching for her long-lost parents along the way.

- William Chan as Ling Yue (陵越)
  - Zhang Yijie as young Ling Yue

The senior disciple and future leader of Tian Yong sect known for his bravery and uprightness. Having lost his younger brother when they were young, Ling Yue treats Tusu as his real sibling and would protect him at all cost.

=== Supporting ===
==== People of Tian Yong City ====
- Ken Chang as Sword Deity Ziyin (紫胤真人), a sword immortal and teacher of Tusu and Ling Yue.
- Zong Fengyan as Sword Deity Hansu (涵素), the leader of Tian Yong sect.
- Chen Zihan as Hong Yu (红玉), a sword spirit under Ziyin who is in charge of protecting the Burning Sword. She has a secret crush on Ziyin.
- Dilraba Dilmurat as Fu Qu (芙蕖), Hansu's daughter. She is a good friend of Tusu and has a crush on Ling Yue.
- Ying Haoming as Ling Duan (陵端), the second disciple of Tian Yong sect. He likes Fu Qu. He hates Tusu and treats him as a monster.
- Cai Zhentao as Ling Chuan (陵川)
- Dai Zixiang as Zhao Lin (肇临)

==== People of You Du / Wu Meng Valley ====
- Vengo Gao as Yin Qianshang (尹千觞) / Feng Guangmo (风广陌), Feng Qingxue's brother and You Du's shaman who is responsible for sealing the Burning Sword. After losing his memory because of a type of medicine that Shao Gong gave him after the latter saved him, he changed his name to Qian Shang. Eventually, he discovers Shao Gong's true nature and stops him from unleashing his evil plan.
- Li Xiaolu as Han Xiuning (韩休宁), Tusu's birth mother and the Head Shaman of Wu Meng Valley.
- Liu Fang as Grandma You Du (幽都婆婆), shaman of You Du
- Shen Baoping as Head of You Du (幽都长老)
- Yang Chengcheng as Huan Huan (欢欢), Qingxue's attendant.
- Yu Zikuan as Grandpa Qiu (秋爷爷)
- Liu Tingyu as Goddess Nuwa (女娲大神)

==== People of River Qin ====
- Zhang Meng as Fang Ruqin (方如沁), Fan Lansheng's sister and the head of the Fang household. She loves Shao Gong since they were kids.
- Fan Cai'er as Ji Tong (寂桐), Xun Fang in disguise. She stays by Shao Gong's side and takes care of him like family.
- Zhang Na as Sun Yueyan (孙月言) / He Wenjun (贺文君), Fan Lansheng's wife. He Wenjun is her previous reincarnation, a Bishan sect disciple and Jin Lei's lover.
- Yue Yaoli as Ye Wenxian (叶父), head of Zi Bi Pavilion who destroyed Bishan sect.
- Qi Wei as Ye Chenxiang (叶沉香), daughter of Ye Wenxian and Jin Lei's fiancé.
- Yue Dongfeng as He Wenjun's father (賀父), head of Bishan sect.
- Ji Yang as Cha Xiaoguai (茶小乖), a sea demon who disguises as a knowledgeable tea server.
- Cheng Cheng as Old Master Fang (方老爹)
- Jin Yiru as Fang Qin'er (方沁儿), Lansheng and Yueyan's daughter. She is named after Fang Ruqin to remember her.
- Tong Tong as Nanny Sun (孙奶娘), Sun Yueyan's caretaker.
- Zheng Yecheng as Wang Cai (旺财), Lan Sheng's attendant.
- Shen Jianing as Yu'er (玉儿), Fang Ruqin's attendant.
- Ma Dalu as Uncle Wu (吴大叔), a constable who saved Baili Tusu's life.
- Wang Jing as Ugly Li Pan'an (丑李潘安)
- Li Ruichao as Handsome Li Pan'an (美李潘安)

==== People of Qing Yun clan ====
- Li Yaojing as Lei Yan (雷严), the head of Qing Yun clan. He aspires to attain immortality and take over the wuxia world, and attempts to manipulate Shao Gong into helping him accomplish his goals.
- Wang Yimiao as Su Jin (素锦) / Jin Niang (瑾娘), Lei Yan's underling who was sent to be a spy under Shao Gong. In order to gain his affections, she transformed her looks to resemble Xun Fang.
- Lee Xindong as Yuan Wu (元勿), one of Lei Yan's underlings.

=== Others ===
- Qiao Zhenyu as Crown Prince Chang Qin (太子长琴)
- Wei Wei as Serpent Qian Yu (水虺悭臾)
- Hao Zejia as Hua Shang (华裳), head of Hua Man Lou and Qian Shang's lover.
- Zhang Yunlong as Hei Yao (黑曜), a black cat demon who works for Qing Yun Sect. After being fed by Qing Xue, he fell in love with her.
- Ma Wenlong as Luo Yunping (洛云平), a plant demon who possessed the Heng Yu Jade and was reborn as a human.
- Yu Yuang as Yan Mei (延枚), a cattle demon.
- Tian Zhenwai as Xiang Tianxiao (向天笑), a sailor in Qing Long Town who takes Tusu to Mt Yao.
- Lu Xianlin as Zhuo Yunfei (卓云飞), also known as Yin Sha, a killer under Xie Luwei.
- Jia Qing as Chou Xinrui (仇馨蕊), Yunfei's lover.
- Xi Xue as Xie Luwei (血露薇), leader of a human kidnapping organization.
- Wang Weiyang as Xiang Moyang (襄墨阳), Xiang Ling's nine-tailed fox father and previous head of the Qing Qiu kingdom.
- Zhang Qian as Jiang Li (姜离), Xiang Ling's human mother.
- Zhu Rongrong as Yun Ge (云歌), a general who betrayed the Qing Qiu kingdom and killed Xiang Moyang.
- Ren Xuehai as Chief of Tie Zhu Hall (铁柱观观主)
- Hei Zi as Emperor Qin Shi Huang (秦始皇)
- Zhao Wenhao as Er Gou Zi (二狗子), a mortal boy whom the Wolf Demon took over to regain its power.
- Zhao Chulun as Immortal Jiao (蛟仙)
- Zhang Xinchen as Shi Yue (噬月), a wolf demon.
- Qiu Lufan as Stone Demon (石妖)
- Ren Han as Octopus Spirit (章鱼精)

== Production ==
The drama was filmed from July 2, 2013, to October 10, 2013, at Hengdian World Studios and Xiandu.

== Soundtrack ==
No.	Title	Lyrics	Music	Singers	Length
1.	"Sword of Heart (剑心)" (Opening theme song (episode 1-26))	Duan Sisi	Tan Xuan	Jason Zhang
2.	"Sword of Heart (剑心)"	Duan Sisi	Tan Xuan	Li Yifeng
3.	"Lover's Song (恋人歌歌)" (Ending theme song (episode 27-50))	Yan Yunnong	Anson Hu	Anson Hu
4.	"Distance (远方)" (Ending theme song (episode 1-26))	Tan Xuan	Tan Xuan	Yu Kewei
5.	"Sword Wound (剑伤)"	Lu Hu	Lu Hu	Li Yifeng
6.	"Loving You is not Wrong (爱你没错)"	Dai Yuedong	Zeng Di	Jeff Chang
7.	"Peers (两同行)"	Tan Xuan	Tan Xuan	William Chan

== Reception ==
The drama was a huge success, topping viewership ratings and market share; and was the most viewed drama online at that time.

The drama was praised for its exciting action scenes, suspenseful plot devices and matching casting. However, it was criticized for its special effects and weak storyline.

=== Ratings ===
Diamond Theater Premiere Ratings
Air date	Episode	Unit name	CSM50 city ratings			CSM34 City ratings		
Air date	Episode	Unit name	Ratings (%)	Audience share (%)	Rank	Ratings (%)	Audience share (%)	Rank
2014.7.02	1-2	Valley of Life	1.377	7.40	1	1.399	7.25	1
2014.7.03	3-4	Valley of Life	1.268	6.63	1	1.305	6.55	1
2014.7.09	5-6	Refining City	1.446	7.94	1	1.461	7.79	1
2014.7.10	7-8	Refining City	1.674	8.39	1	1.697	8.26	1
2014.7.16	9-10	Juzhichuan	1.760	8.66	1	1.752	8.39	1
2014.7.17	11-12	Juzhichuan	1.695	8.03	1	1.717	7.92	1
2014.7.23	13-14	Mystery	1.519	8.02	1	1.501	7.66	1
2014.7.24	15-16	Mystery	1.420	7.10	1	1.387	6.72	1
2014.7.30	17-18	Charm	1.680	8.51	1	1.710	8.37	1
2014.7.31	19-20	Charm	1.317	6.56	1	1.302	6.23	1
2014.8.06	21-22	Forbidden Lake	1.442	7.60	1	1.439	7.33	1
2014.8.07	23-24	Forbidden Lake	1.536	7.74	1	1.541	7.52	1
2014.8.13	25-26	Qiu Zhiyuan	1.556	8.14	1	1.494	7.58	1
2014.8.14	27-28	Qiu Zhiyuan	1.786	6.90	1	1.600	7.94	1
2014.8.20	29-30	Illusion	1.431	7.55	1	1.425	7.29	1
2014.8.21	31-32	Illusion	1.695	8.79	1	1.691	8.53	1
2014.8.27	33-34	Battle Mausoleum	1.431	8.25	1	1.387	7.75	1
2014.8.28	35-36	Battle Mausoleum	1.381	7.08	1	1.312	6.53	1
2014.9.03	37-38	Sea of clouds	0.743	4.37	1	0.724	4.13	1
2014.9.04	39-40	Sea of clouds	0.852	4.74	1	0.833	4.47	1
2014.9.10	41-42	Spirit Mountain	0.847	4.87	1	0.812	4.52	1
2014.9.11	43-44	Spirit Mountain	0.824	4.64	1	0.790	4.31	1
2014.9.17	45-46	East Sea	0.858	4.94	1	0.857	4.76	1
2014.9.18	47-48	East Sea	0.980	5.71	1	0.961	5.39	1
2014.9.24	49-50	East Sea	0.979	5.79	1	0.957	5.47	1
2014.9.25	51-52	East Sea	1.194	6.75	1	1.114	6.23	1
Average ratings			1.314	7.02	/	1.314	6.73	/
Note: The ratings are from 22:00 to 24:00

National network ratings
Air date	Episode	Ratings (%)	Audience share (%)	Rank
2014.7.02	1-2	1.57	10.89	1
2014.7.03	3-4	1.73	11.99	1
2014.7.09	5-6	1.85	13.03	1
2014.7.10	7-8	2.02	13.02	1
2014.7.16	9-10	2.45	14.80	1
2014.7.17	11-12	2.08	12.95	1
2014.7.23	13-14	2.14	14.56	1
2014.7.24	15-16	2.03	13.10	1
2014.7.30	17-18	1.82	11.81	1
2014.7.31	19-20	1.91	12.26	1
2014.8.06	21-22	1.88	12.61	1
2014.8.07	23-24	1.97	13.17	1
2014.8.13	25-26	1.95	13.16	1
2014.8.14	27-28	1.92	13.02	1
2014.8.20	28-30	1.79	12.23	1
2014.8.21	31-32	1.94	13.49	1
2014.8.27	33-34	1.82	14.07	1
2014.8.28	35-36	1.60	11.39	1
2014.9.03	37-38	0.78	6.49	1
2014.9.04	39-40	0.88	6.87	1
2014.9.10	41-42	0.92	7.42	1
2014.9.11	43-44	0.93	7.27	1
2014.9.17	45-46	1.04	8.40	1
2014.9.18	47-48	1.12	9.22	1
2014.9.24	49-50	1.23	10.12	1
2014.9.25	51-52	1.32	10.48	1
Average ratings		1.64	11.45	/
Note: The ratings of ratings are from 22:00 to 24:00

- Highest ratings are marked in red, lowest ratings are marked in blue

=== Awards and nominations ===
Award	Category	Nominated	Result
13th Huading Awards	Audience's Favorite Actress	Zheng Shuang	Won
iResearch Marketing Awards	Best Media Marketing	Swords of Legends	Won
iQiyi All-Star Carnival	Most Popular Actor	Li Yifeng	Won
iQiyi All-Star Carnival	Most Popular Male Actor	William Chan	Won
6th China TV Drama Awards	Most Popular Television Series	Swords of Legends	Won
6th China TV Drama Awards	Most Popular Actor (Mainland China)	Li Yifeng	Won
6th China TV Drama Awards	Most Commercially Valuable Actor	Li Yifeng	Won
6th China TV Drama Awards	Most Popular All-Rounded Artist	William Chan	Won
6th China TV Drama Awards	Most Anticipated Actor by the Media	William Chan	Won
6th China TV Drama Awards	Best Original Soundtrack	"Sword of Heart"	Won
8th Baidu Fudian Awards	Most Popular Actor	Li Yifeng	Won
8th Baidu Fudian Awards	Most Popular Actress	Yang Mi	Won
8th Baidu Fudian Awards	Rising Actor	William Chan	Won
13th Sichuan Television Festival	Jury Special Prize	Swords of Legends	Won
17th Huading Awards	Best Actress	Yang Mi	Nominated
17th Huading Awards	Best Actor (Ancient drama)	Li Yifeng	Nominated
17th Huading Awards	Best Newcomer	William Chan	Nominated
21st Shanghai Television Festival	Best Supporting Actor	William Chan	Nominated
