= Irina Kaptelova =

Ukrainian actress (born 1986)

- Born: 3 June 1986 (age 40); Dnipropetrovsk, Ukraine
- Education: Dnipropetrovsk National University
- Occupations: Actress, model, journalist
- Years active: 2008–present
- Website: irinakaptelova.ru

Irina Kaptelova (Ukrainian: Ірина Каптелова) is a Ukrainian actress. She's widely known for having played a number of roles in TV and movie industry of China.

== Life and career ==
Kaptelova graduated from the Faculty of International Journalism at the Dnipropetrovsk National University in 2008, and then worked as a television host for a short term. She studied acting under Vitaly Malakhov, People's Artist of Ukraine, Taras Shevchenko National Award Laureate, Art director of Theatre on Podol. In 2012 she was admitted to the acting department in Russian Academy of Theatre Arts.

Her film debut was as a Russian military officer in Winter Is Not Cold (2009), which was later censored in China. After playing leading roles in several scripted series, she gained recognition for her performance in the drama My Natasha (2012). Set in Northeast China and Soviet Union, My Natasha is an epic love story spanning 50 years.

It was the first foreign actress who played the female lead in the Chinese television series. My Natasha became a success upon its release and launched Kaptelova on the path to stardom. Her performance won wide acclaim from film critics and the media, "She has created a unique image, playing with unique acting skills. 'My Natasha' made her the most brilliant star of Chinese screen". That same year, Kaptelova won the award of "Best Foreign Actress" at the 2012 TV Drama Awards Made in China.

In addition to Ukrainian and Russian, Kaptelova speaks English and Chinese. Now Kaptelova is involved in the filming of a new major series about Yung Wing, the first Chinese student in U.S. It is a joint Chinese-US project, and Kaptelova plays Yung Wing's American wife, Mary Kellogg.

== Filmography ==
=== Film ===
Year	Title	Role	Notes
2008	Winter is not cold 冬天不冷	Soldier Doria	
2010	The Hutou Fortress - Bacteria 虎头要塞细菌	Shawa	

=== Television ===
Year	Title	Role	Notes
2009	Northeast Love Story - Russian Girls in Xiaocheng 俄罗斯姑娘在小城	Donnia	
2010	The Doctors 医者仁心	Anesthesiologist Alice	
2011	The Tide 潮人	Nakali	
2011	East 东方	Officer	Guest star
2012	My Natasha 我的娜塔莎	Natasha	
2012	New Year Picture 年画	Natalia	
2013	Pathfinding to the Northeast - Prequel 闯关东前传	Catherine	
2013	New Youth 新青年	Helen	
2013	Yung Wing 容闳	Mary Kellogg	
