= Guilty of Mind =

- Poster
- Chinese: 心理罪
- Directed by: Xie Dongshen
- Screenplay by: Gu Xiaobai
- Based on: 心理罪画像 by Lei Mi
- Starring: Li Yifeng; Liao Fan; Wan Qian
- Production company: Heli Chenguang International Culture Media
- Release date: August 11, 2017
- Country: China
- Language: Mandarin
- Box office: US$45.9 million

Guilty of Mind (Chinese: 心理罪) is a Chinese suspense crime film based on the novel Guilty of Mind: Portrait (Chinese: 心理罪画像) by Lei Mi, starring Li Yifeng, Liao Fan and Wan Qian. The film was released in China on August 11, 2017.

== Plot ==
A gifted criminal profiler, Fang Mu is asked to assist the police in solving a bizarre campus serial killing. Working together with Police Captain Tai Wei, Fang Mu tries to crack down the murder cases, but he unknowingly gets embroiled in a battle of wits.

== Cast ==
- Li Yifeng as Fang Mu
- Liao Fan as Tai Wei
- Wan Qian as Qiao Lan
- Li Chun as Chen Xi
- Yu Lang as Luo Yi
- Chang Kuo-chu
