= Fearless Whispers =

Chinese historical television series

- Drama's poster
- Also known as: Secret and great
- 隐秘而伟大
- Genre: Spy; War; Actions; Workplace; Political
- Written by: Pu Wei; Huang Chen
- Directed by: Wang Wei
- Starring: Li Yifeng; Gina Jin; Niu Junfeng; Wang Longzheng
- Country of origin: China
- Original language: Mandarin
- No. of episodes: 51 Episodes (TV version)

Production
- Producer: Zhang Hong
- Production location: Shanghai China
- Running time: 45 minutes
- Production companies: Mango Studios; Give Me Five Culture; Innovation Media Power; Shine Asia Mango TV

Original release
- Network: CCTV-8
- Release: 6 November – 1 December 2020

Fearless Whispers《 Chinese: 隐秘而伟大 Pinyin: Yǐnmì ér wěidà Other name: Secret and Great》is a Chinese historical television series, 2020 Best Drama Magnolia Awards finalist, starring Li Yifeng, Gina Jin and Wang LongZheng. It aired on CCTV-8 from 6 November to 1 December 2020.

== Synopsis ==
After winning the Anti-Japanese War, Gu Yaodong (Li Yifeng), a top-class law graduate from Dongwu University who grew up in a Shanghai alley, became a Criminal Police Officer with the ideal of "Supporting justice and Protecting the people". However, Gu Yaodong, who had just entered the workplace, was not only squeezed and suppressed by his colleagues in the Criminal Investigation Division but also involved in the fierce struggle between the Communist Party’s underground intelligence network and the Kuomintang police. In the chaotic times, Gu Yaodong had to make a choice that was loyal to his beliefs in the confrontation between justice and injustice. In the end, with the help and training of the Shanghai Underground Party, Xia Jicheng (Wang Longzheng) and Shen Qinghe (Gina Jin), he fulfilled his ideals in the journey of revolution and gained precious love.

== Cast ==
=== Main cast ===
| Actors | Roles | Descriptions |
| Li Yifeng | Gu Yaodong | Growing up in a Shanghai alley, with the idea of "supporting justice and protecting the people", he became a criminal policeman as he wished. On the first day of joining the Shanghai Police Department, there were frequent situations. He accidentally disrupted the 1st criminal division's operation and became a thorn in their eyes. Faced with the "bullying and harassment", Gu Yaodong persisted despite his embarrassment. |
| Gina Jin | Shen Qinghe | In everyone's eyes, Shen Qinghe looks like a normal person who loves money, but because of her multiple identities and her secret tasks. She is actually the liaison officer of the underground party responsible for the transmission of information. Later, due to organizational arrangements, she has to live in Gu Yaodong's home as a tenant. After experiencing many hardships, she finally fell in love with him. |
| Wang Longzheng | Xia Jicheng | The director of the 2nd Criminal Division of Shanghai Police, a middle-aged man who is slick and sophisticated, and loves to eat chicken legs and rub mahjong. After meeting Gu Yaodong, Xia Jicheng often thought of himself back then. He had a special affection for Gu Yaodong and was also a teacher and friend. At the same time, he was also a member of the Shanghai Underground Party. |
| Niu Junfeng | Zhao Zhiyong | Born in an ordinary family, he has his own way of dealing with interpersonal relationships in the chaotic era. To stabilize his job in the police station, he was slick and experienced in dealing with people around him. He was a kind senior to Gu Yaodong, but he definitely won't fight with his superiors to help anyone. |

=== Supporting cast ===
- Shi Shi as Ding Fang
- Wang Xiaoyi as Wang Keda
- Huang Shuowen as Yang Kui
- Wang Chao as Qi Shengping
- Li Qiang as Zhong Baiming
- Ge Si as Li Qishen
- Song Jiateng as Xiao Derong
- He Huan as Bao Yimin
- Han Yezhou as Yu Datong
- Zhang Haotian as Inspector Liu
- Hou Xuelong as Secretary Fang
- Luo Jingmin as Chief Kong
- Zhao Chengshun as Boss Dong
- Liu Wei as Gu Bangcai, Gu Yaodong's father
- Liu Jie as Gu Yaodong's mother
- Zhou Zhi as Gu Yuexi, Gu Yaodong's sister
- Guo Tangwei as Duo Duo, Gu Yaodong's nephew
- Yang Haoyu as Yang Yixue
- Zhao Yunzhuo as Yang Fuduo
- Hou Changrong as Hu Zhongqi
- Fang Zhoubo as Inspector Duan
- Zhou Jie as Assistant Chief Tian
- Zhou Xiaohai as Chief Tang
- Yue Jingwei as Mrs. Qi
- Zhang Lan as Zhao Zhiyong's mother
- Zhang Dabao as He Zuxing
- Luo Ji as Xu San
- Yang Taoge as Secretary Qiu
- Zhang Han as Chen Xianmin
- Yan Feng as Team Leader Huang
- Ren Luomin as Shao Baichen
- Zhao Xinhuan as Wen Shaoqun
- Li Deliang as Lu Ming
- Liu Baixi as Team Leader Cai
- Archi as Jack
- Yan Zhiping as Shang Rongsheng
- Ma Wei as Shang Junyi
- Li Shengrong as Ding Naisheng
- Zheng Xiaowan as Mother Ding
- Zong Xiaojun as Inspector Nan
- Li Shuai as Team Leader Hong
- Zhu Feng as Wu Liansheng
- Wang Kanwei as CEO Huang
- Chen Youning as Manager Chen
- Lu Xiaolin as Zhou Mingpei
- Zheng Liang as Zheng Xin
- Leng Haiming as Li Shuzheng
- Bi Hanwen as Grocery Stall Owner
- Zhao Yucheng as Lady Boss
- Jiang Rong as Mrs. Li
- Zhu Yuan as Mrs. Xiao
- Zhou Zixin as Mrs. Yu
- Zhu Liqun as Mrs. Wu
- Yu Xiaodong as Mr. Wu
- Wang Jian as Son Wu
- Zhang Fan as Xiao Wang
- He Xiao as Xiao Wang's Wife

== Casting ==
Wang Wei (director) said that all casts are the first options for their roles.

About Gu Yaodong, Many people wondered how could he persuaded a top star like Li Yifeng to take on the greenhorn policeman role. He said that he had to talk to Li Yifeng twice before Li Yifeng accepted the role. Gu Yaodong is the protagonist but has no aura of the protagonist. He is not as smart as the other spy war drama's protagonists. Gu Yaodong is a normal person but every character is related to him. Over 1,300 scenes belong to him. Makes this role extraordinary. The actor who takes on this role has to play charmingly. He has to be charming enough to make the audience feel Gu Yaodong's cuteness and won't make the role annoying. So Wang Wei needed an actor who could attract the audiences to stay tuned to see the protagonist's developments. Li Yifeng is very capable.

About Xia Jicheng, Wang Wei and Wang Longzheng have worked together in "Evil Minds" and "Day and Night (TV series)". In Wang Wei's opinion, Wang Longzheng is a neat actor, a professional one. He once said "Wang Longzheng is an actor I love in all aspects. He is different from the role he took. I know him and know what he can bring to the role.

About Shen Qinghe, At first, Wang Wei had no actress in mind, until Li Yifeng recommended Gina Jin to him. He agreed with Li Yifeng that she is suitable for the role. Gina Jin once said that she felt really grateful to Li Yifeng for his recommendation. Because she had problems with her agency at that time and had no job for 9 months. It had been really difficult for her till she got this role.

== Receptions ==
The series was praised for its tightly woven plot, production quality, and acting performance. Achieved High scores from many sites; Douban 8.2 points, Zhihu 9.1, Tencent 9.3 The series was Top 1 drama with the highest rating during the broadcast. and was in the Top 10 of 2020 Douban highest-rated dramas.

Li Yifeng ranked 1st in November VLinkage actor chart; followed by Gina Jin 16th and Wang Longzheng 22nd

In Datawin 2020 list, Fearless Whispers arrived 1st in the period drama chart. Li Yifeng also crowned the 1st place of period drama actors; followed by Gina Jin in 8th place.

From all success, the series has been rerun 7 times in a month after the first-round broadcast and had been rerun 101 times till now (March, 2022).

== Ratings ==
| Date | Episode | CSM National Network ratings | | | China Audiovisual Big Data (CVB) ratings | | |
| Date | Episode | Ratings% | Audience Share% | Rank | Ratings% | Audience Share% | Rank |
|---|---|---|---|---|---|---|---|
| 2020.11.6 | 1-2 | 0.82 | 4.11 | 1 | 1.001 | 3.844 | 2 |
| 2020.11.7 | 3-4 | 0.89 | 3.85 | 1 | 1.118 | 4.506 | 1 |
| 2020.11.8 | 5-6 | 1 | 4.39 | 1 | 1.110 | 4.506 | 1 |
| 2020.11.9 | 7-8 | 0.98 | 4.43 | 1 | 1.188 | 4.506 | 1 |
| 2020.11.10 | 9-10 | 1 | 4.57 | 1 | 1.276 | 4.506 | 1 |
| 2020.11.11 | 11-12 | 0.99 | 4.56 | 1 | 1.191 | 4.506 | 1 |
| 2020.11.12 | 13-14 | 1 | 4.53 | 1 | 1.168 | 4.506 | 1 |
| 2020.11.13 | 15-16 | 0.98 | 4.25 | 1 | 1.213 | 4.506 | 1 |
| 2020.11.14 | 17-18 | 1.12 | 4.8 | 1 | 1.288 | 5.242 | 1 |
| 2020.11.15 | 19-20 | 1.09 | 4.73 | 1 | 1.255 | 5.242 | 1 |
| 2020.11.16 | 21-22 | 1.19 | 5.37 | 1 | 1.362 | 5.242 | 1 |
| 2020.11.17 | 23-24 | 1.12 | 5.13 | 1 | 1.398 | 5.242 | 1 |
| 2020.11.18 | 25-26 | 1.16 | 5.14 | 1 | 1.400 | 5.242 | 1 |
| 2020.11.19 | 27-28 | 1.22 | 5.46 | 1 | 1.487 | 5.242 | 1 |
| 2020.11.20 | 29-30 | 1.2 | 5 | 1 | 1.470 | 5.242 | 1 |
| 2020.11.21 | 31-32 | 1.2 | 4.98 | 1 | 1.659 | 6.253 | 1 |
| 2020.11.22 | 33-34 | 1.18 | 5.12 | 1 | 1.531 | 6.253 | 1 |
| 2020.11.23 | 35-36 | 1.21 | 5.38 | 1 | 1.694 | 6.253 | 1 |
| 2020.11.24 | 37-38 | 1.16 | 5.15 | 1 | 1.618 | 6.253 | 1 |
| 2020.11.25 | 39-40 | 1.29 | 5.79 | 1 | 1.731 | 6.253 | 1 |
| 2020.11.26 | 41-42 | 1.32 | 5.84 | 1 | 1.731 | 6.253 | 1 |
| 2020.11.27 | 43-44 | 1.38 | 5.77 | 1 | 1.728 | 6.253 | 1 |
| 2020.11.28 | 45-46 | 1.44 | 6.02 | 1 | 1.956 | 7.158 | 1 |
| 2020.11.29 | 47-48 | 1.48 | 6.42 | 1 | 1.888 | 7.158 | 1 |
| 2020.11.30 | 49-50 | 1.36 | 6.1 | 1 | 1.943 | 7.158 | 1 |
| 2020.12.1 | 51 | 1.33 | 5.67 | 1 | 1.886 | 7.158 | 1 |
| Average ratings | | 1.158 | 5.098 | | 1.465 | 5.400 | |

- Highest ratings are marked in red, lowest ratings are marked in blue

== Soundtracks ==
| No. | Title | Singers | Length |
|---|---|---|---|
| 1. | "Song without Words" | Wang Zihe |
| 2. | "The wind blows the past" | Yin Shuyi |
| 3. | "Inscription" | Huang Shuowen |

== Awards and nominations ==
| Award | Category | Nominee | Result | Ref. |
|---|---|---|---|---|
| 2020 TV Landmark and Voice of China | Outstanding drama of the year | Fearless Whispers | Won | |
| 2020 Douban Movies of the Year | Top Rated Chinese TV Series | Fearless Whispers | Won | |
| National Radio and Television Administration | Drama Of The Year | Fearless Whispers | Won | |
| The 2nd Fusion Screen Communication Ceremony | Outstanding Period Drama | Fearless Whispers | Won | |
| 2020 Blue Book of Chinese TV Series | Top Ten Influential TV Series | Fearless Whispers | Won | |
| 27th Magnolia Awards 2021 | Best Television Series | Fearless Whispers | Nominated | |
| 27th Magnolia Awards 2021 | Best Cinematography | Fearless Whispers | Nominated | |
| 27th Magnolia Awards 2021 | Best Original Screenplay | Fearless Whispers | Nominated | |
| 2020 Weibo Entertainment White Paper | The Most Watched Drama Actor | Li Yifeng | Won | |
| 2020 Film and Television Role Models | Innovative Drama | Fearless Whispers | Won | |
| 2020 Film and Television Role Models | Popular Supporting Actor | Wang Longzheng | Won | |

== Broadcasting ==
| No. | Channel | Location | Broadcast date | Broadcast time | Remarks |
|---|---|---|---|---|---|
| 1 | CCTV-8 | China | November 6, 2020 | 19.30 | |
| 1 | Mango TV | China | November 6, 2020 | VIP members will be updated every night at 24:00; Non-members will be updated at 24:00 the next day | |
| 1 | Tencent Video | China | November 6, 2020 | VIP members will be updated every night at 24:00; Non-members will be updated at 24:00 the next day | |
| 2 | CCTV-1 | China | November 13, 2020 | 09:30 | |
| 3 | Jiangsu City Channel | China | November 16, 2020 | 19:30 | |
| 4 | CCTV-8 | China | December 11, 2020 | 16:30 | |
| 5 | Shenzhen TV | China | December 24, 2020 | 19:35 | |
| 6 | SETV | China | December 28, 2020 | 19:35 | |
| 7 | Sichuan TV | China | January 2, 2021 | 19:35 | |
| 8 | East Movie Channel | China | January 5, 2021 | 19:00 | |
| 9 | Shenzhen TV | China | January 25, 2021 | 09:58 | |
| 10 | ZTV-4 | China | January 26, 2021 | 18.30 | |
| 11 | Jilin TV | China | February 3, 2021 | 19:30 | |
| 12 | Shandong TV | China | February 12, 2021 | 19:30 | |
| 13 | Jiangsu TV | China | February 14, 2021 | 08:13 | |
| 14 | Jieyang Public Channel | China | February 21, 2021 | 23:30 | |
| 15 | CCTV-1 | China | March 1, 2021 | 09:29 | |
| 16 | Jiangsu City Channel | China | March 9, 2021 | 00:10 | |
| 17 | Dongfang TV | China | May 6, 2021 | 13:59 | |
| 18 | CCTV-1 | China | May 23, 2021 | 08:38 | |
| 19 | Fujian Comprehensive Channel | China | May 26, 2021 | 20:21 | |
| 20 | CCTV 4K Ultra HD Channel | China | June 16, 2021 | 14:47 | |
| 21 | East Movie Channel | China | July 4, 2021 | 13:16 | |
| 22 | CCTV-7 | China | July 9, 2021 | 21:55 | |
| 23 | Shandong TV | China | July 10, 2021 | 22:00 | |
| 24 | CCTV-8 | China | August 3, 2021 | 22.15 | |
