= Happy Michelin Kitchen =

- Promotional poster
- Also known as: 幸福我不讓; Happy Michelin 3
- 幸福三顆星
- Genre: Romance; Comedy
- Directed by: Tzu-Ping Lin (林子平)
- Starring: Lan Cheng-lung; Cheryl Yang; Li Jin Ming; Wu Jian Fei
- Opening theme: "這一次愛妳" (Zhe Yi Ci Ai Ni) by COLOR Band
- Ending theme: "說愛 不愛" (Shuo Ai Bu Ai) by Chen Si Han
- Country of origin: Taiwan
- Original language: Mandarin
- No. of series: 1
- No. of episodes: 32

Production
- Producers: 羅法平, 陳燕萍
- Production location: Taiwan
- Running time: 120 minutes
- Production company: Anhui Television International Media Ltd.

Original release
- Network: CTV; Anhui Television
- Release: 23 January – 17 March 2012

Related
- Happy and Love Forever, Sunny Happiness

Happy Michelin Kitchen (Chinese: 幸福三顆星) is a 2012 Taiwanese romantic-comedy television series. The television drama was produced by Anhui Television International Media Ltd., starring Lan Cheng-lung and Cheryl Yang. The shooting began during mid-June 2011, and first aired on January 23, 2012 on Anhui Television.

== Synopsis ==
An Shao Cheng (Lan Cheng Long) is a second generation restaurateur who is supposed to take over their restaurant after he was fooled about his mother's death. He, then meets and falls in love with an ordinary looking but extraordinarily skilled chef, Xin Duo Duo (Cheryl Yang).

== Cast ==
=== Main ===
- Lan Cheng-lung as An Shao Cheng
- Cheryl Yang as Xin Duo Duo
- Li Jin Ming as Li Ru Zhen
- Wu Jian Fei as Gu Da Peng
- Ying Er as Zhou Jia Qi
- Li Zhi Nan as Ding Wei Gang

=== Supporting ===
- Li Yi Feng as Xiang Yu Chao
- Liu Chao as Ding Wei Ming
- Lu Yi-ching as Xiao Qing
- Li Sheng Rong as Li Yi Yang
- Xu Zhi He as Xiao Qiang
- Fan Xiao Po as Lu Mei Ci
- Zhou Da Qing as Zhou Jing
- Yan Jing Yao (as Ye Min Fang
- Dong Zhi Cheng as Na Bai Chuang
- Chen You Fang as Zeng Cui Hua
- Marie Zhuge as Cai Shan
- An Dong Ni as Tao Zhe Ming
- Wang Jing Qiao as Meng Xiao Fei
- Abe Tsuyoshi as store manager
- Lu Jia Xing as Song Xin Xin

=== Guest appearances ===
from Happy and Love Forever

- Ming Dao as Yi Ding Qiang
- Annie Chen as Pan Xiao Nuo

from Sunny Happiness

- Mike He as Xiang Yu Jie
- Janine Chang as Fang Yong Yong

== Broadcast ==
Network	Country/Location	Airing Date	Timeslot
Anhui Television	Mainland China	January 23, 2012	Daily, 7:30-9:30pm
CTV	Taiwan	March 18, 2012	Sundays, 10pm-12am

== Multimedia ==
Happy Michelin Kitchen (幸福三顆星) did not release any soundtrack. However, there are songs used in the series. In particular, the series had nine songs from different artists, released in their respective albums. The opening theme song used is "This Time: :Love You" or "Zhe Yi Ci Ai Ni" by COLOR band, while the ending theme song used is by Chen Si Han entitled "Shuo Ai Bu Ai".

=== Track listing ===
No.	Title	Singer - Album	Length
1.	"Dream Now" (這一次愛妳 Meng Xiang Qian Xing)	COLOR Band
2.	"King of Kung Fu Restaurant" (Gong Fu Liao Li Wang)	COLOR Band
3.	"This Time: :Love You" (這一次愛妳)	COLOR Band - Color Man
4.	"Luxury And Happiness" (Xing Fu Wei Xiao Qu)	Chen Si Han
5.	"Happy Smile Song" (She Chi De Xing Fu)	Chen Si Han
6.	"Say Love Is Not Love" (Shuo Ai Bu Ai)	Chen Si Han
7.	"Gentle Star" (Wen Rou De Xing Xing)	Wu Jian Fei - Jarvis
8.	"No One" (Mei You Ren)	Jie Wei Ling
9.	"If You Say You Love MeWo" (Ru Guo Ni Shuo Ai)	Kimi Li

== Episode ratings ==
Happy Michelin Kitchen ranked fourth in its pilot episode, until it gradually goes to the third spot in the last series, with a total average of 0.56. Its drama competitors were TTV's Love Forward, CTS's I Love You So Much and Alice in Wonder City, and FTV's Skip Beat! and Absolute Darling. The viewers survey was conducted by AGB Nielsen.

Air Date	Episode	Average Ratings	Rank	Remarks
March 18, 2012	01	0.71	4	
March 25, 2012	02	0.60	4	
April 1, 2012	03	0.53	4	
April 8, 2012	04	0.56	4	
April 15, 2012	05	0.49	4	
April 22, 2012	06	0.45	4	
April 29, 2012	07	0.60	4	
May 6, 2012	08	0.47	4	
May 13, 2012	09	0.49	4	
May 20, 2012	10	0.58	4	
May 27, 2012	11	0.50	4	
June 3, 2012	12	0.61	3	
June 10, 2012	13	0.63	2	
June 17, 2012	14	0.69	3	Last episode
Average rating		0.56		
