= Legend of Fragrance =

- Promotional poster
- Also known as: Butterfly Fragrance
- Genre: Romance; Melodrama; Republican
- Written by: Lin Yaling
- Directed by: He Shupei; Cheng Zhichao
- Starring: Li Yifeng; Tiffany Tang; William Chan; Shu Chang
- Opening theme: Scent of Love by Yisa Yu
- Ending theme: Warm Heart Sings by Li Yifeng
- Country of origin: China
- Original language: Mandarin
- No. of episodes: 42

Production
- Production locations: Shanghai Image Maker Corp., Ltd
- Running time: 45 mins
- Production companies: H&R Century Pictures Co., Ltd

Original release
- Network: Hunan TV
- Release: 4 February – 2 March 2015

Legend of Fragrance (Chinese: 活色生香) is a 2015 Chinese television series starring Li Yifeng, Tiffany Tang, William Chan and Shu Chang. It aired on Hunan TV from 4 February to 2 March 2015.

The series averaged a rating of 1.89% (CSM50) and was a hit in China.

== Synopsis ==
A story about the rivalry between two prominent families in the fragrance industry, which spawned birth secrets, revenge plots as well as the star-crossed love story of their children.

On the day of Ning Haotian (Ken Chang)'s marriage, his fiancé Xiang Xueyin (Tang Yixin) eloped with his junior, An Qiusheng (Lv Xingyu). Lingying's lady-in-waiting, Su Yun (Zhang Na) impersonates her mistress and marries into the Ning family. She gives birth to a pair of twins, a son Ning Zhiyuan (Li Yifeng) who does not possess the sense of smell and daughter Ning Peishan. Xueyin gives birth to a baby girl named An Ruohuan (Tiffany Tang), who carries a unique scent on her body. She then died drinking poison to save husband.

An Qiusheng misunderstood and thought that Bai Songxian (Yang Mingna) had let his whereabouts be known to Ning Haotian, who had wanted to exact revenge on him for eloping with his fiancé. He then abducted the Wen family's elder son Wen Shiqing, and changed his name to An Yichen (William Chan). After Songxian lost her son, she wanted to commit suicide, but met An Ruohuan, whom the Ning's housekeeper could not bear to kill. Songxian then decided to give up thoughts of suicide and adopted Ruohuan, changing her name to Le Yan. The few families then decided to use the "Fragrance of Lost Memory" on their children, to wipe out their memories.

Twelve years later, Yichen was tasked to investigate the case of missing young ladies in the Mo Wang province. In reality, he is under An Qiusheng's orders to seek revenge, taking the opportunity to destroy the Wen and Ning family. Yichen seeks help from his Japanese classmate, Xiaoya Huizi (Shu Chang). However, Huizi's father Tai Lang (Li Yaojing) schemes to steal the Chinese traditional artistic fragrance secrets, and plans to conquer Mo Wang Province. Meanwhile, Ruohuan infiltrates the Ning Family under An Yichen and An Shengqiu's plot to steal an invaluable perfume concoction recipe. There, she meets the spoilt young master Zhiyuan and the two often squabble. Zhiyuan eventually falls for the hardworking and sweet Ruo Huan, risking his life several times to save her.

== Cast ==
=== Main ===
Actor	Role	Description
Li Yifeng	Ning Zhiyuan	The spoilt young master of the Ning family. He does not possess the sense of smell since he was born.
Tiffany Tang	An Ruohuan / Le Yan	The daughter of An Shengqiu and Xiang Xueyin, who adopted by Madame Wen. Naturally gifted at the sense of smell, she is a highly skilled perfume maker.
William Chan	An Yichen / Wen Shiqing	The adopted son of An Shengqiu, who is actually the long lost Young Master Wen. He is used as a tool for revenge by An Shengqiu.
Shu Chang	Xiaoya Huizi	Daughter of Xiaoya Tailang. She is classmates with An Yichen, and falls in love with him, despite her father's orders.

=== Supporting ===
Actor	Role	Description
Ken Chang	Ning Haotian	Zhiyuan and Shanpei's father. The first "Mo Wang".
Huang Ming	Wen Shixuan	2nd young master of the Wen family. The second "Mo Wang"
Li Xirui	Ning Peishan	Zhiyuan's twin sister, Wen Shixuan' wife.
Yang Mingna	Bai Songxian	First wife of Wen Jingchang, Shiqing's birth mother. Because of a misunderstanding, she was chased out of the Wen Mansion and becomes Le Yan's adoptive mother.
He Zhonghua	Wen Jingchang	Shixuan and Shiqing's father.
Lu Xingyu	An Qiusheng	Ruohuan's father, and Yichen's adoptive father. In order to seek revenge, he kidnapped Wen Family's son.
Li Yaojing	Xiaoya Tailang	Xiaoya Huizi's father. He plans to conquer Mo Wang Province, and make use of his daughter to steal the Chinese traditional artistic fragrance secrets.
Tang Yixin	Xiang Xueyin	Ruohuan's mother. She died after drinking poison on behalf of her husband.
Zhang Weina	Su Yun	Zhiyuan and Shanpei's mother, Xiang Xueyin's maid.
Yi Yun	Chun Miao	Le Yan's good friend.
Fang Wen	Xia Hegui	Chun Miao's husband.
Luo Mi	Xia Chan	A girl captured by Wen Shixuan.
Ren Han	Su Qiu	Xiang Xueyin's maid.

== Soundtrack ==
Legend of Fragrance - Original Television Soundtrack ( 活色生香电视剧原声音乐大碟)
No.	Title	Music	Length
1.	"Scent of Love (戀香)"	Yisa Yu
2.	"Warm Heart Sings (心如玄铁)"	Li Yifeng

== Ratings ==
Air date	Episode	CSM50 city ratings			National Internet ratings		
Air date	Episode	Ratings (%)	Audience share (%)	Rank	Ratings (%)	Audience share (%)	Rank
February 4, 2015	1-2	1.876	5.026	1	3.43	9.29	1
February 5, 2015	3-4	1.722	4.642	1	3.16	8.57	1
February 6, 2015	5	1.312	3.576	1	2.62	7.10	1
February 7, 2015	6	1.213	3.358	2	2.62	7.10	1
February 8, 2015	7-8	1.944	5.155	1	2.62	7.10	1
February 9, 2015	9-10	2.347	6.216	1	3.72	10.11	1
February 10, 2015	11-12	2.159	5.764	1	3.31	9.18	1
February 11, 2015	13-14	2.196	5.928	1	3.86	10.57	1
February 13, 2015	15	1.155	3.275	3	1.93	5.33	1
February 14, 2015	16	1.069	3.062	3	1.93	5.33	1
February 15, 2015	17-18	1.945	5.347	1	3.13	8.63	1
February 16, 2015	19-20	1.887	5.25	1	3.52	9.68	1
February 17, 2015	21-22	2.123	5.805	1	-	-	-
February 18, 2015	23	0.945	2.751	1	-	-	-
February 19, 2015	24	1.408	4.11	1	-	-	-
February 20, 2015	25	1.188	3.782	3	-	-	-
February 21, 2015	26	1.123	3.506	3	-	-	-
February 22, 2015	27-28	1.756	5.223	1	-	-	-
February 23, 2015	29-30	1.834	5.387	1	-	-	-
February 24, 2015	31-32	2.147	5.908	1	-	-	-
February 25, 2015	33-34	2.113	5.645	1	3.68	10.27	1
February 26, 2015	35-36	2.345	6.25	1	4.06	11.21	1
February 27, 2015	37	1.473	3.873	1	2.69	7.09	1
February 28, 2015	38	1.7	4.506	1	3.27	8.92	1
March 1, 2015	39-40	2.181	5.959	1	3.27	8.92	1
March 2, 2015	41-42	2.252	6.222	1	4.22	11.96	1
Average ratings		1.89	5.22	1	-	-	-

- Highest ratings are marked in red, lowest ratings are marked in blue

== International broadcast ==
- Taiwan: Much TV, Next TV
- Thailand: True4U
