= Tiger Hu =

Chinese singer-songwriter and producer

- 胡彦斌
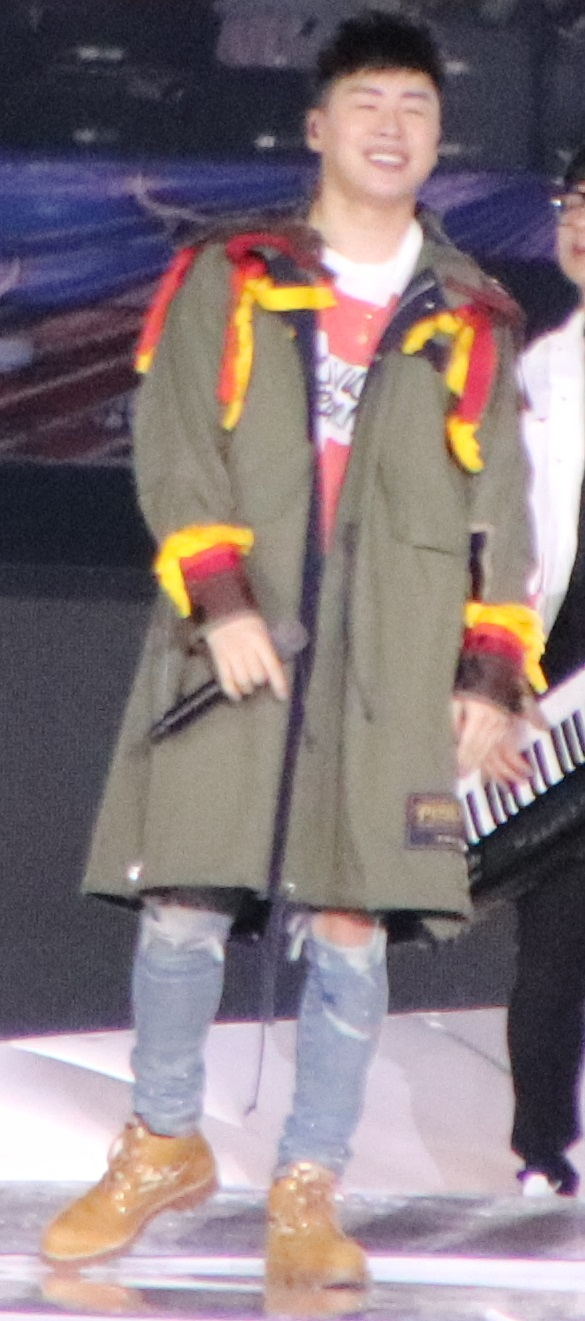
- Hu in 2019
- Born: 4 July 1983 (age 43); Shanghai, China
- Occupation: Singer-songwriter record producer
- Years active: 2002–present

Chinese name
- Traditional Chinese: 胡彥斌
- Simplified Chinese: 胡彦斌
Transcriptions
Standard Mandarin
- Hanyu Pinyin: Hú Yanbīn
- Musical career
- Also known as: 斌斌, 老胡
- Genres: Pop; R&B; Rock; Electronic
- Labels: Tiger Entertainment (2013–present); Yue Hua Entertainment (2011–2012); Gold Typhoon (2004–2010); Go East Entertainment (2002–2004)
- Website: Official Micro-blog; Official Blog

Hu Yanbin (born 4 July 1983), formerly known as Anson Hu, is a Chinese singer, singer-songwriter, music director, and record producer.

== Career ==
In 1999, he participated in the Shanghai "Asian Music Festival" Newcomer Singer Competition and debuted.

In 2004, he composed and sang the Chinese and English version of the theme song "宣言 (Declaration)" for the "AFC Asian Cup". In 2006, he composed the theme song "And Want You Know" for the "Shanghai International Athletics Gold Grand Prix".

In 2012, he changed his Latin-script stage name to Tiger Hu with the release of his eighth studio album, One Size Bigger.

== Discography ==
=== EPs ===
- 《紅歌》 Red Song (2009)

=== Studio albums ===
| Album information | Track listing |
|---|---|
| 胡彦斌: Studio Album; Released: 16 December 2002; Label: Go East Entertainment Co. Ltd | Track listing: 1. 和尚; 2. 超时空爱情; 3. 告诉我; 4. 有梦好甜蜜（with Rain Lee）; 5. Make Friend; 6. 毒药; 7. 包袱; 8. 小狗; 9. 暗恋; 10. 不是不想; 11. 超时空爱情（和唱) with William So) |
| 文武双全升级版: Studio Album; Released: 25 July 2003; Label: EMI | Track listing: 1. 老爸你別装酷; 2. 梦 3. 猜 4. 你纪得吗; 5. 目不转睛; 6. 第一次（with Ronald Cheng）; 7. 黑雨; 8. 透明人; 9. 想 10. 昨天是你生日; 11. 進行式（with Elva Hsiao) |
| Music 混合体: Studio Album; Released: 7 September 2004; Label: EMI | Track listing: 1. 情不自禁; 2. Waiting for You; 3. 干脆点; 4. 我的未來不是梦; 5. 红颜; 6. 尴尬; 7. 借口; 8. 宣言; 9. I Wanna Be; 10. 一个人 兩个人 |
| Music 混合体: Studio Album; Released: 21 April 2006; Label: EMI | Track listing: 1. 皇帝; 2. 一年前; 3. 三对三; 4. 你这么晚了还沒睡; 5. 梦中的婚礼; 6. 天若有情; 7. 蝴蝶; 8. 愿望; 9. 恶作剧男孩; 10. 葬英雄 |
| 男人歌: Studio Album; Released: 22 November 2007; Label: EMI, Gold Label | Track listing: 1. 婚礼进行曲; 2. 音乐让我说爱你; 3. 男人KTV; 4. 到了沒; 5. 未满18岁; 6. 潇湘雨; 7. 江湖; 8. 诀别诗; 9. 巴黎铁塔; 10. 滑板; 11. 另一个自己（with Stephy Tang) |
| 音乐斌潮: Studio Album; Released: 9 July 2008; Label: EMI, Gold Label | Track listing: 1. 男人KTV; 2. Waiting For You; 3. 你这么晚了还沒睡; 4. 巴黎铁塔; 5. 潇湘雨; 6. 月光; 7. 婚礼进行曲; 8. 情不自禁; 9. 18禁 (Intro); 10. 18禁; 11. 和尚; 12. 想 13. 红颜; 14. 老爸你别装酷; 15. 和尚 (Demo) |
| 失业情歌: Studio Album; Released: 8 December 2009; Label: Gold Label | Track listing: 1. 你買單還我買單; 2. 失業情歌; 3. 筆墨登場; 4. 不曾後悔; 5. 羅馬假日; 6. 空位; 7. 林妹妹; 8. Fun Run; 9. 勇敢去愛吧; 10. 父親; 11. 閃亮的日子 |
| Who Cares?: Studio Album; Released: 30 September 2011; Label: Warner Music Group | Track listing: 1. Life; 2. 一萬光年; 3. 鴻門宴; 4. 女人不該讓男人流淚; 5. One Night In Shanghai; 6. 傷痕; 7. Lisa I Love You; 8. 不是猛龍不過江; 9. 小小的心願; 10. 愛情總是猜得到開頭猜不到結尾 |
| 大一號 GROW: Studio Album; Released: 29 October 2012; Label: Warner Music Group | Track listing: 1. 愛情是怎麼了; 2. 我以為; 3. 卡拉永遠ok 4. 在一起; 5. 江湖再見; 6. 心的未來; 7. Interlude; 8. 搖滾天生大一號; 9. 劫後餘生; 10. 沉默的大多數; 11. 三十而立; 12. 大夢想家 |
| 太歌 Tiger: Studio Album; Released: 19 January 2014; Label: Tiger Entertainment, Ocean Butterflies International | Track listing: 1. 沒那麼簡單; 2. 為你我受冷風吹; 3. 天黑黑; 4. 當愛已成往事; 5. 你買單還我買單; 6. 紅顏; 7. 空位; 8. 成長; 9. 如果; 10. 追月 |
| 覅忒好: Studio album; Released: 23 January 2018; Label: Tiger Entertainment | Track listing: 1. Give me a chance 2. 覅忒好; 3. 你要的全拿走; 4. 高手; 5. 返老還童; 6. Yes I Do; 7. 明星; 8. Leave me alone (Remix); 9. Hello (Remix) |

== Filmography ==
=== Film ===
| Year | English title | Original title | Role | Notes/Ref. |
|---|---|---|---|---|
| 2015 | Oh My God | | | |
| 2015 | Fall in Love Like a Star | 怦然星动 | Song Ming | |

=== Variety show ===
| Year | English title | Chinese title | Role | Notes |
|---|---|---|---|---|
| 2018 | Produce 101 | 创造101 | Composer instructor | |
| 2018 | Sound Of My Dream 3 | 梦想的声音 3 | Judge | |
| 2019 | Produce Camp 2019 | 创造营 2019 | Rap instructor | |
