= Anhui Television =

Chinese television network

- Type: Broadcast
- Country: People's Republic of China
- Official website: http://www.ahtv.cn/

Anhui Television (AHTV; Chinese: 安徽卫视) is a television network in the Chinese provinces of Hefei and Anhui. It first aired on 30 September 1960, but had its broadcasts suspended between 1962 and 1969. AHTV currently broadcasts in Mandarin.

The channel started satellite broadcasts in 1997. In 2009 it premiered the Thai drama series Battle of Angels; its success led to an increase of interest in Thai productions in China.

== List of Anhui Television programs ==
=== Current programming ===
- Nan sheng nü sheng xiang qian chong

=== Former programming ===
- Kunlun Fight
