= Mojin: The Lost Legend =

- Poster
- Traditional Chinese: 鬼吹燈之尋龍訣
- Simplified Chinese: 鬼吹灯之寻龙诀
- Literal meaning: Ghost Blowing Lantern: Seeking Dragon Technique
- Hanyu Pinyin: Guǐ Chuīdēng Zhī Xún Lóng Jué
- Jyutping: Gwai2 Ceoi1 Dang1 Zi1 Cam4 Lung4 Kyut3
- Directed by: Wuershan
- Written by: Zhang Muye
- Based on: Ghost Blows Out the Light by Zhang Muye
- Produced by: Chen Kuo-fu
- Starring: Chen Kun; Huang Bo; Shu Qi; Angelababy; Xia Yu
- Cinematography: Jake Pollock
- Edited by: Du Yuan
- Music by: Koji Endo
- Production companies: Dalian Wanda Group; Huayi Brothers; Enlight Media
- Release date: December 18, 2015 (China)
- Running time: 125 minutes
- Country: China
- Language: Mandarin
- Budget: US$37 million
- Box office: US$278.3 million

Mojin: The Lost Legend (previously titled The Ghouls) (English: Touching Gold: The Lost Legend) is a 2015 Chinese action adventure fantasy thriller film based on the novel Ghost Blows Out the Light. It was directed by Wuershan and produced by Chen Kuo-fu. The film was released on December 18, 2015.

== Plot ==
At the beginning of the 1990s, famous tomb explorer Hu Bayi, Wang Kaixuan, and Hu's fiancée Shirley Yang decided to retire to Manhattan. After a supposed split of the team, Wang Kaixuan was pulled into a deal to locate the ancient tomb of a Mongolian princess. Hu Bayi has been having recurring nightmares of his first love, Ding Sitian, who had supposedly died 20 years before in an underground tomb beneath the Mongolian plains. The team is lured back to their original vocation by a mysterious, businesswoman/cult leader Ying Caihong who wants them to find the ancient tomb of a Mongolian princess. They eventually learn that what she really wants is to possess a famed artifact known as the Equinox Flower that allegedly has the power to raise the dead.

== Cast ==
- Chen Kun as Hu Bayi
- Huang Bo as Wang Kaixuan
- Shu Qi as Shirley Yang
- Angelababy as Ding Sitian
- Xia Yu as Big Gold Tooth
- Liu Xiaoqing as Ying Caihong

== Production ==
Filming locations in Mojin: The Lost Legend

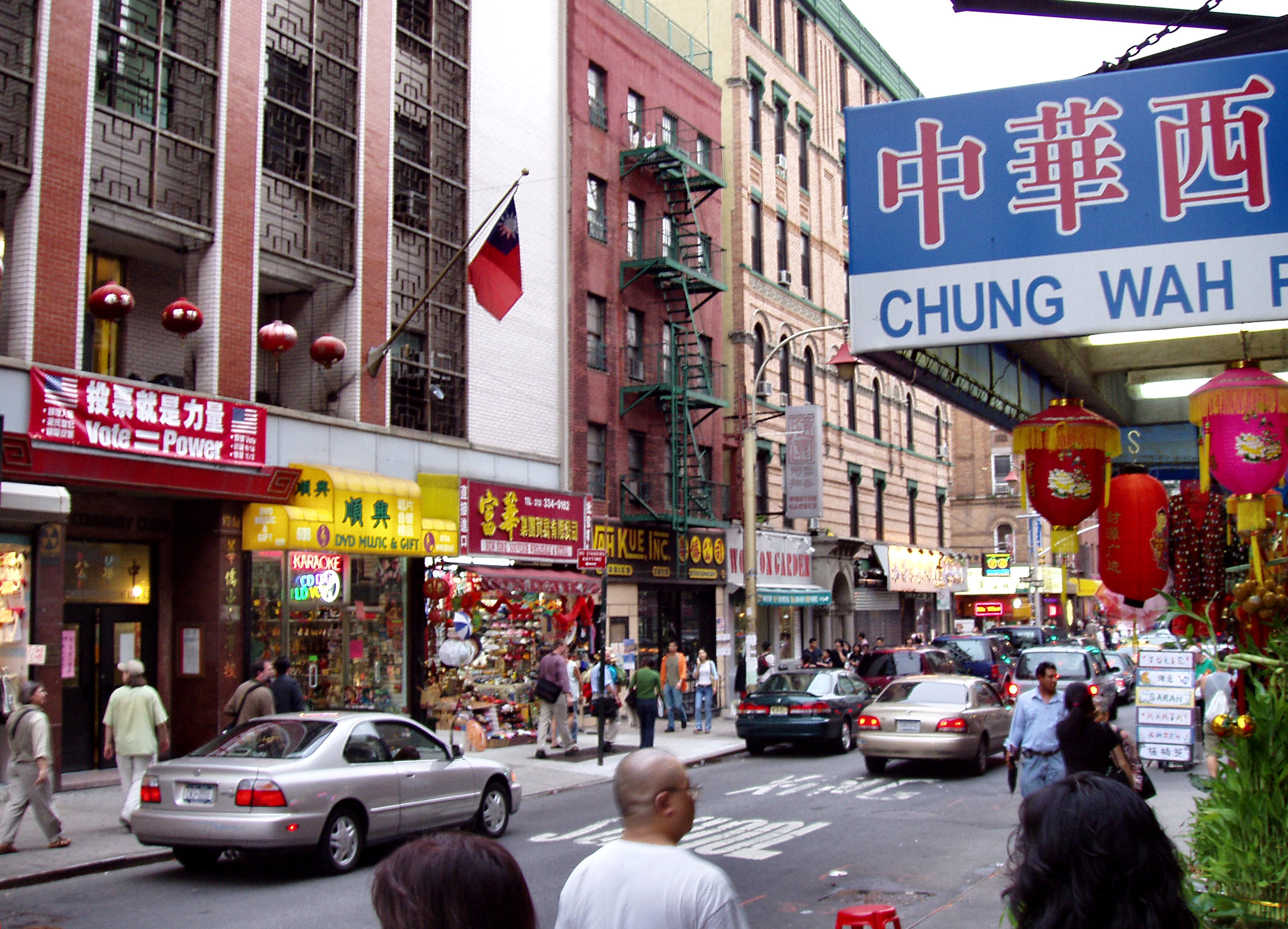
Chinatown, Manhattan

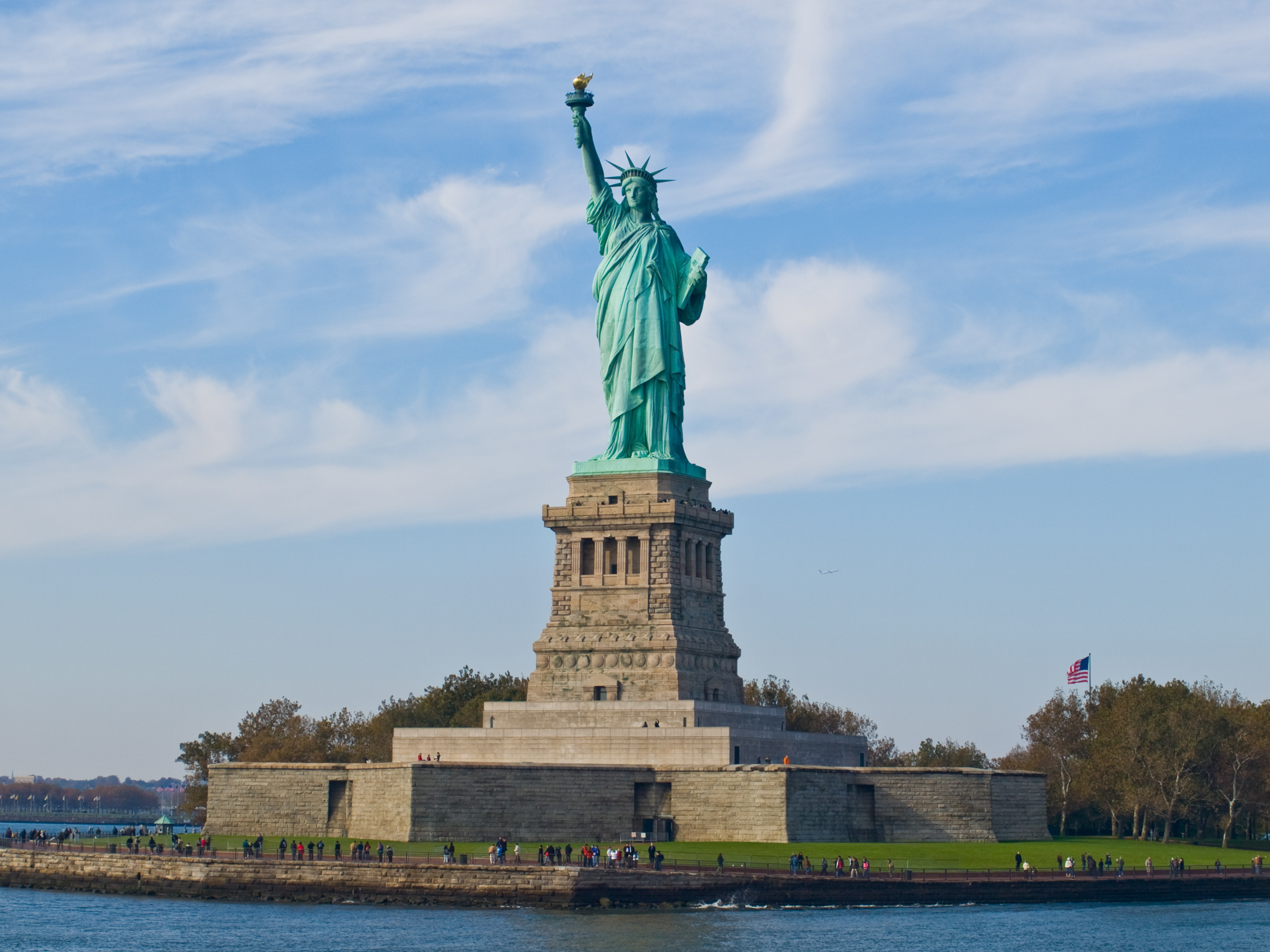
New York City

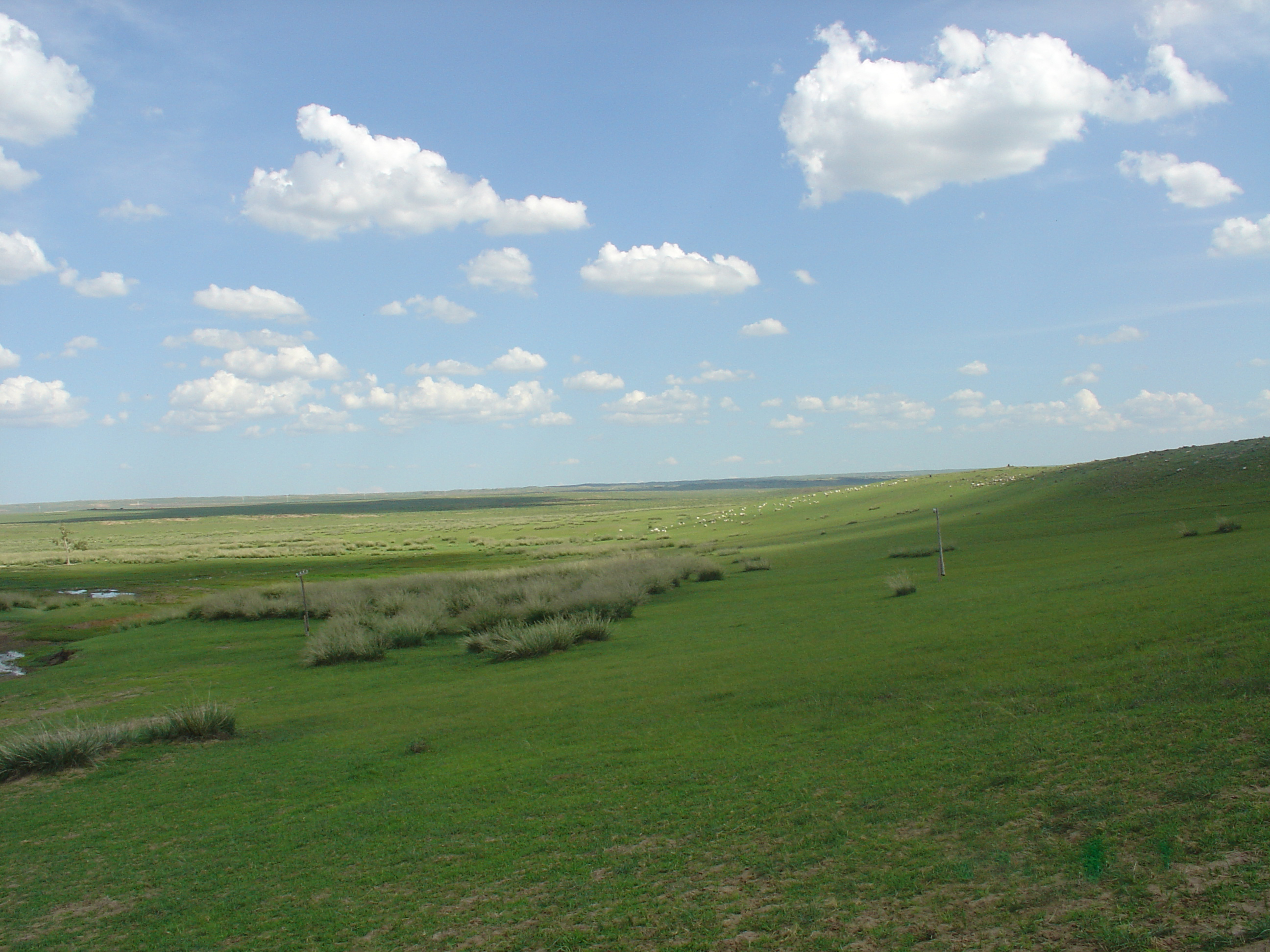
Parts of Inner Mongolia

The film is based on the popular adventure novel series Ghost Blows Out the Light about a trio of legendary grave robbers, and is the second film following Chronicles of the Ghostly Tribe to be adapted based on the series. Mojin was based on the series' last four volumes while Chronicles of the Ghostly Tribe was based on series’ first four volumes. After Wanda Media acquired the rights to film the last four volumes, other production companies such as Huayi Brothers Media and Beijing Enlight Pictures came on board, adding financial and produced the project.

Filming wrapped up in New York City in late March 2015. As of October 14, 2015, the film was being remastered for the IMAX 3D format.

== Release ==
The film was released in 2D, 3D, IMAX and IMAX 3D formats in China on December 18, 2015, and on the same day in the United States and Canada in 2D by Well Go USA Entertainment across 30 theaters. Following the huge commercial success of Chinese films like Monster Hunt and Lost in Hong Kong, Greg Foster, senior executive VP, IMAX Corporation and CEO of IMAX Entertainment said the company was looking forward to witness such success again with the film because the suspenseful and visual nature of the film, combined with the Chinese cultural interest in treasure-hunting, makes Mojin: The Lost Legend a perfect fit for the IMAX experience. It was released in a total of 269 IMAX screens in mainland China.

Due to sensitive issues about the circulation of national treasures abroad and the reported prevalence of grave robbing in poorer parts of China, the subject was feared to be taboo on screen, making the project one of the Chinese film industry's most anticipated movie over its three and a half year production period.

== Reception ==
=== Box office ===
Prior to its release, various film critics were predicting the film would be a significant hit at the box office. It is the highest-grossing IMAX film of all time in China with $27.1 million (as of January 6, 2016). Mojin: The Lost Legend earned US$26.4 million on its opening day in China which is the highest-grossing opening day for a 3D local language film. This includes the US$1.34 million it earned from midnight screenings, also a new record for a 3D local film. In addition to this, it earned the largest single-day gross for a local 3D title ($35.5 million on Saturday, December 19). Through its opening weekend, it grossed US$85 million (per Rentrak), US$91.9 million (per Entgroup) and debuted at No. 1 in China and No. 2 worldwide (behind Star Wars: The Force Awakens). The film has the third biggest three-day opening of all time in China behind Monster Hunt and Lost in Hong Kong (both of which were also released in 2015). Furthermore, it also broke the record for the biggest IMAX midnight gross (US$300,000), opening day (US$2.7 million) and opening weekend (US$7.5 million) from 250 IMAX screens.

In its second weekend, it grossed another US$44 million – US$95.7 million in its full second week – falling behind newcomer Devil and Angel. Of that US$6 million alone came from 259 IMAX screens for a 10-day cumulative of US$17.6 million becoming the second-highest grossing local language film for IMAX ever in China. The film went on to surpass Monster Hunt (US$27.0 million) to become the highest-grossing Chinese-language IMAX film in China, with US$27.1 million. It is only behind Furious 7 (US$39 million) when incorporating all kinds of films.

In the United States and Canada, it opened with US$280,000 from 22 theaters.

=== Critical reception ===
While the performances of the cast, special effects and action sequences have been praised, the film overall has received largely mixed reviews from western critics. The review aggregator website Rotten Tomatoes reported a 50% approval rating, based on 6 reviews, with an average rating of 4.6/10.

Daniel M. Gold of The New York Times gave a negative review saying the film wastes some fine actors such as Shu Qi "on predictable, one-dimensional characters, and once the tomb is entered, the underground sets become all but interchangeable. What starts eerie becomes strictly cartoonish." Likewise, the Los Angeles Times gave a negative review. Writing for rogerebert.com, Mark Dujsik awarded the film one and a half stars out of four calling it, "equal parts shabby and discomforting."

However, not all reviews were negative. David Noh of Film Journal International advised "Grab a big bag of popcorn and a soda and sink yourself into this rambling but skillfully done and surprisingly deep Chinese action romp." Frank Scheck of The Hollywood Reporter—while criticising the film for being overlong, convoluted and repetitive—praised the action sequences and special effects, deeming them superb, and lauded the performances of the leads. Chief Asia film critic Maggie Lee of Variety agreed that the film provided "enough robust action and technical moxie to make audiences overlook its formulaic plotting and rote characterizations." Jake Wilson of The Sydney Morning Herald gave the film three stars out of five, writing "the result can feel a bit disjointed: it takes a long time for things to get started, and there are too many distractions for the hints of social commentary and tragedy to register with much force." But he praised the cinematography, comparing it to that of Peter Jackson's work on The Lord of the Rings trilogy. The Taipei Times said the movie "is lavish, packed with eye-dazzling action and fantastic plots, making it feel right at home among the Lara Croft: Tomb Raider films."

=== Accolades ===
Year	Award	Category	Recipient(s) and nominee(s)	Result	Notes
2016	23rd Beijing College Student Film Festival	Best Writing	Zhang Jialu	Nominated	
2016	23rd Beijing College Student Film Festival	Best Visual Effects		Won	
2016	33rd Hundred Flowers Awards	Best Film		Nominated	
2016	33rd Hundred Flowers Awards	Best Director	Wuershan	Won	
2016	33rd Hundred Flowers Awards	Best Actress	Shu Qi	Nominated	
2016	33rd Hundred Flowers Awards	Best Supporting Actor	Xia Yu	Nominated	
2016	33rd Hundred Flowers Awards	Best Supporting Actress	Angelababy	Won	
2016	53rd Golden Horse Film Festival and Awards	Best Visual Effects	Douglas Hans Smith, Sam Wang, Sam Khorshid, Strilen Liu	Won	

== Sequel ==
A sequel of the film, although without the original film's director, writer or cast, titled Mojin: The Worm Valley, was released in 2018.
