= China Image Film Festival =

Chinese film festival in London, England

The China Image Film Festival is the largest Chinese film festival in Europe. Hosted in London, the festival aims to promote Chinese films and cultures across the world.

China Image Film Festival was established in 2009. This year’s celebration of Chinese films is organised by China UK Culture and Creative Industry Association. As a platform for cultural exchange between the UK and China, the festival has gained support from The State Administration of Radio Film and China Television (SARFT) in addition to the Chinese embassy’s cultural affairs office. The festival has generated support from the United Kingdom’s Cultural Affairs Bureau, British Council, as well as other agencies, associations, businesses, and institutions.

The difference between the previous few years and this year is the establishment of the British professional short film section. This segment shows famous short English films to both Chinese and British audiences. British professional films of the same calibre will be screened in both the UK and China. In turn, well-known short film directors will be meeting the audiences during this particular time.

== Festival ==
The festival's main activities include a selection of Chinese films, 'five-minute’ short film competitions, an exhibition week of Chinese films, and a forum for Chinese and British film makers. Through film screening and forum discussion, the festival aims to promote Chinese cinematic arts, ethical standards, and cultural beliefs to the British public.

- Film Exhibition Week

20 films are selected for screening at the China Image Film festival. Through screenings at different cinemas, audiences from different backgrounds can choose different types of films and meet with the film production teams to exchange ideas and make suggestions.

- Sino-British filmmaker Forum

The participants of the forum include directors, actors and actress, producers, screenwriters, and others in the film industry. Topics may include the supply chain in the film industry, the development of new technology, market promotion, and the way of collaboration. The outcomes are put in the Sino-British film industry and creating suitable business models for collaborative companies.

- Awards and Closing Ceremony

The awards and closing ceremony are held on the last day of the festival. The winners are invited to the ceremony to collect the awards through the international media.

== 2012 festival ==
Outstanding Film: Girls Always on the Right Side

Outstanding Directing: Yang Shupeng - An Inaccurate Memoir

Outstanding Actor in a Leading Role: Huang Xiaoming, An Inaccurate Memoir

== 2011 festival ==
The Most Brilliant Director: Wang Quan'an - Apart Together

The Most Brilliant Actress: Lisa Lu - Apart Together

The Most Brilliant Actor: Fan Wei - Tracks Kong LingXue

The Committee Special Awards: Beginning of the Great Revival

== 2010 festival ==
Best Film: The Floating Shadow

Best Director: Dongshuo Jia - The Floating Shadow

Best Actor: Wu Jiang - The Robbers

Best Actress: Jia Li - The Floating Shadow

Best Screenplay: Chen Peng - Walking to school

== Filmmakers and other distinguished guests ==
Director: Gu Changwei, Cai Shangjun

Actors and Actresses: Zhang Jingchu, Jiang Wenli, Alec Su, Huang Yi, Ma Yili, Fan Wei, Siqin Gaowa, Chen Jianbin
