= Joe Chen =

Taiwanese actress, singer and television host

- 陳喬恩
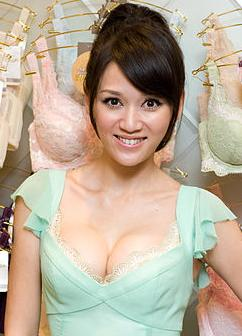
- Chen in 2009
- Born: 4 April 1979 (age 47); Hukou, Hsinchu, Taiwan
- Education: Kuang-Fu High School
- Occupations: Actress; singer; host
- Years active: 2001–present
- Spouse: Alan Chen (m. 2022)
- Musical career
- Label: Chen Qiao En Studio
- Formerly of: 7 Flowers

Chinese name
- Traditional Chinese: 陳喬恩
- Simplified Chinese: 陈乔恩
Transcriptions
Standard Mandarin
- Hanyu Pinyin: Chén Qiáo Ēn
Yue: Cantonese
- Jyutping: Chan Kiu Yan

Joe Chen Chiao-en (Chinese: 陳喬恩; pinyin: Chén Qiáo'ēn; born 4 April 1979) is a Taiwanese actress, singer and television host.

Known as the "Queen of Idol Dramas", Chen is known for her roles in The Prince Who Turns into a Frog (2005), Fated to Love You (2008) and The Queen of SOP (2012). She was nominated at the 43rd Golden Bell Awards for her role in Fated to Love You.

In 2013, Chen's popularity rose in mainland China, where she gained a large number of fans for her role as Dongfang Bubai in the Chinese wuxia series Swordsman. Chen also entered the Forbes China Celebrity 100 List for the first time. She solidified her popularity in highly rated television series Cruel Romance (2015), Destined to Love You (2015), Stay with Me (2016) and Candle in the Tomb (2016).

Chen ranked 99th on Forbes China Celebrity 100 list in 2013, 65th in 2014, 61st in 2015, and 51st in 2017.

== Career ==
=== 2001–2004: Beginnings ===
Joe Chen began working as a model and assistant in 2001. She entered the entertainment industry after winning 1st place on Sanlih E-Television's talent show. In 2002, she began her acting career by taking on a supporting role in the television drama, Lavender. She also became a host for SET variety shows Zhong Guo Na Me Da and Zong Yi Qi Jian, alongside famous Taiwanese hosts Jacky Wu and NONO.

After being neglected by her company for six months, she attracted the attention of SET's executive Zong Limei, who cast her in 100% Senorita (2003). This was her first leading role. The drama became the highest rated Taiwanese drama then, and also achieved moderate success overseas. Joe then make her debut in Taiwanese girl group 7 Flowers the following year.

=== 2005–2012: Rising popularity ===
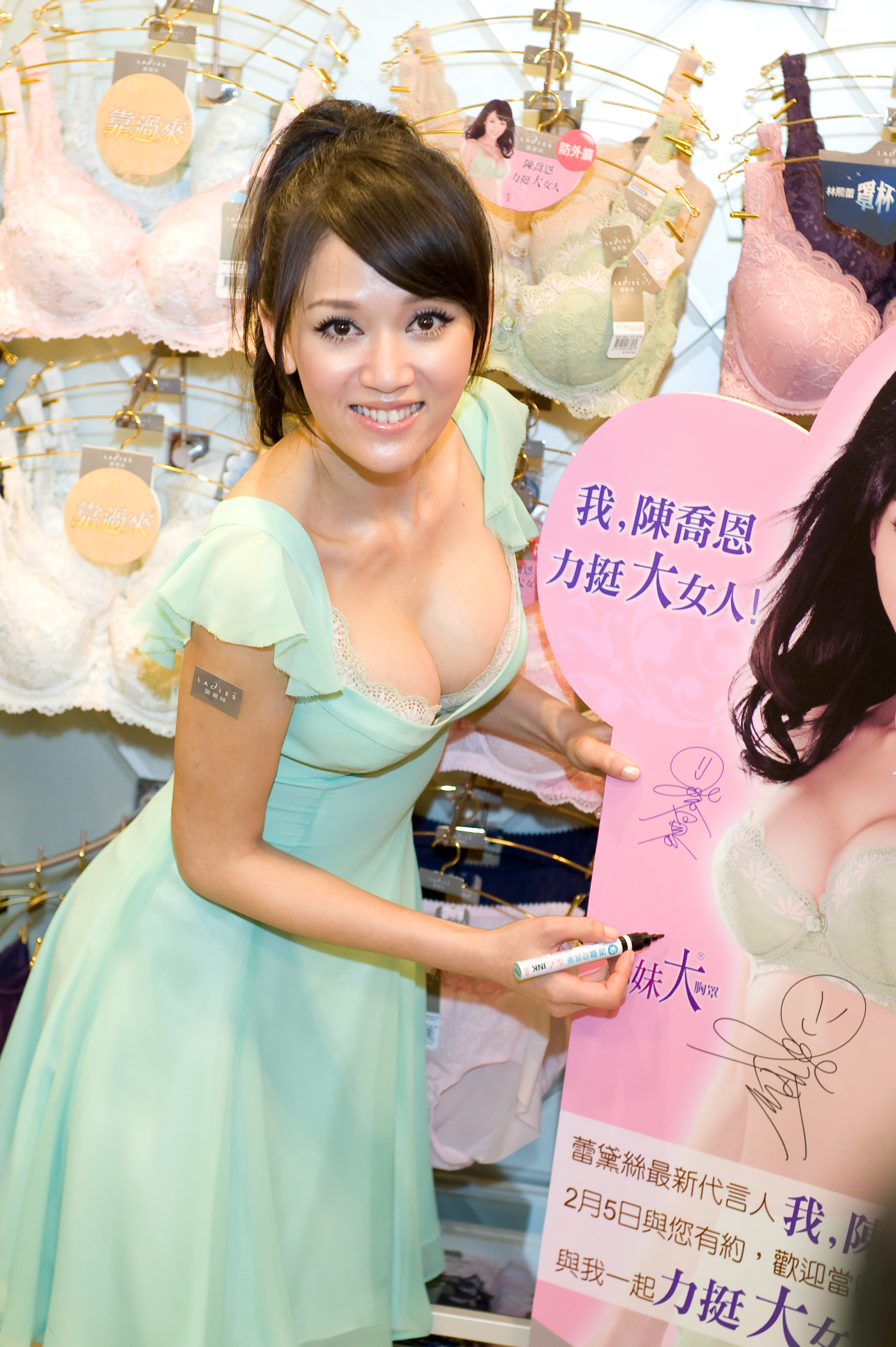
Joe Chen is also known for her great figure. The "Ladies" endorsed by her has attracted huge popularity in 2009.

Joe achieved breakthrough with her performance in The Prince Who Turns into a Frog (2005). The drama had a peak rating of 8.05, dethroning the previous record held by Meteor Garden to become the highest rated Taiwanese idol drama.

From 2006 to 2007, Joe began to host several Taiwanese variety programs like Treasure Hunter and Stylish Man – The Chef. She also starred in the dramas A Game About Love and Ying Ye 3 Jia 1.

In 2008, Joe starred in Fated to Love You opposite Ethan Juan, which beat Joe's previous drama, The Prince Who Turns into a Frog to become the highest rated Taiwanese idol drama. The drama also received popularity overseas, and was covered by America's Wall Street Journal. Joe was nominated for Best Actress in a TV Series at the 43rd Golden Bell Awards and was named "Queen of Idol Dramas" by Taipei Times.

In 2009, Joe was then cast in her first Chinese drama, The Girl in Blue, adapted from an online novel by Fei Wo Si Cun. The series was broadcast on Hunan TV in 2010.

In 2010, she was cast in her first film, Breaking the Waves, a youth sports film produced by John Woo for the Asian Games.

Joe returned to idol dramas after 4 years in the romantic comedy drama The Queen of SOP, which was broadcast on Hunan TV in 2012. The Queen of SOP achieved high ratings and positive reviews, further boosting Joe's popularity in China. She also released an OST for the drama titled "Like to be Lonely", which topped the Baidu Chinese Music Charts for two weeks.

=== 2013–present: Breakthrough in China, Theater debut and continued success ===
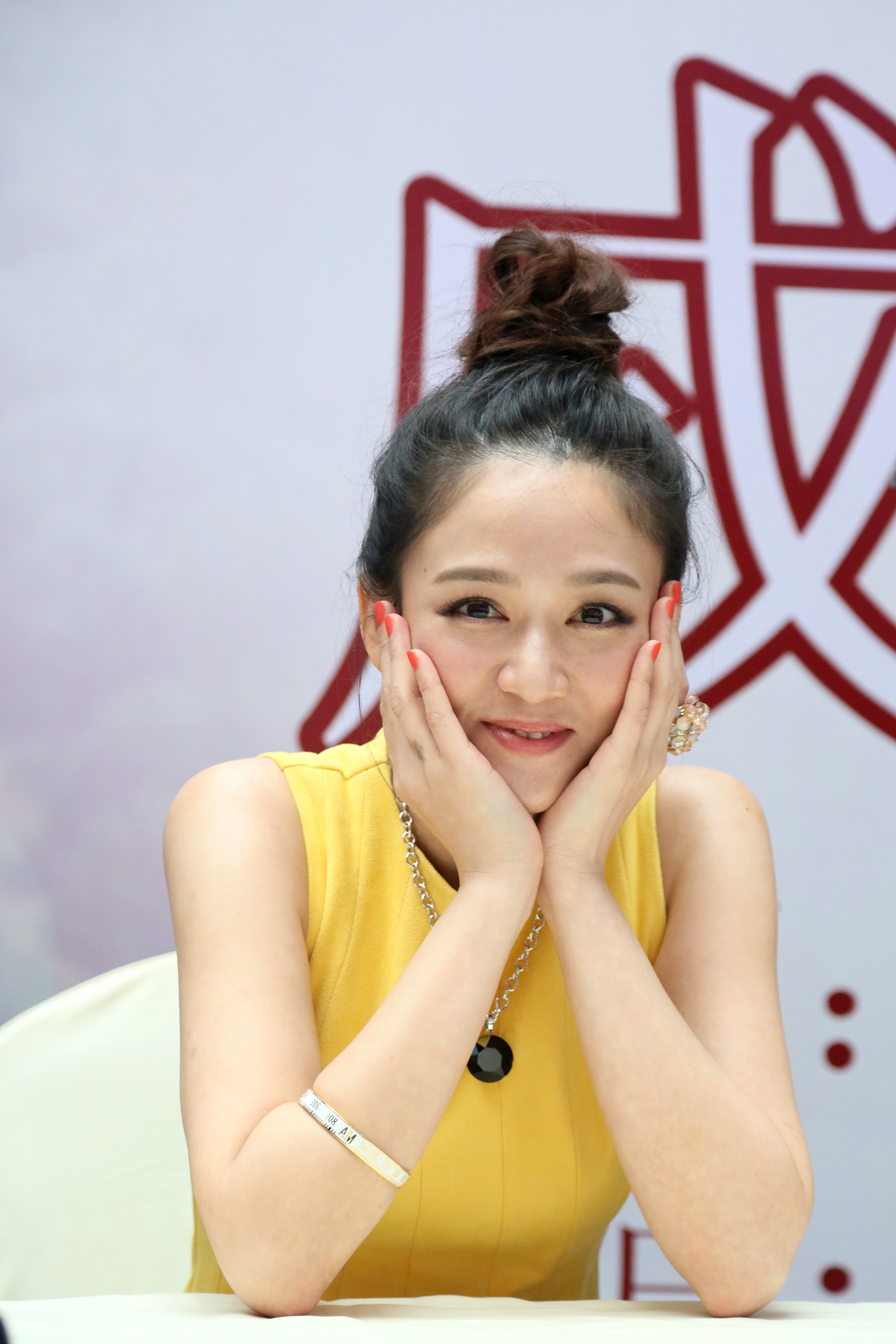
Chen in 2013

Joe rose to mainstream popularity in China after starring in the Chinese wuxia drama Swordsman, adapted from Louis Cha's novel The Smiling, Proud Wanderer. She portrayed the anti-heroine Dongfang Bubai. Though there were initial doubts to her characters (as Dongfang Bubai is a male in the original novel), Joe later won the hearts of the audience through her complex and rich portrayal of her character. Joe experienced a rise in popularity, and won the Most Popular Actress award at the 5th China TV Drama Awards. The same year, Joe made her debut in musical theater, starring as the female lead in The Woman on the Breadfruit Tree, based on Amy Cheung's novel of the same name. She was nominated as Best New Actress at the 4th One Drama Presentation for her performance.

In 2014, Joe starred in The Monkey King, portraying Princess Iron Fan. The film was a huge commercial success, grossing US$180 million internationally. She also featured in the road-trip comedy film The Continent, directed by Han Han.

In 2015, Joe starred in her first period drama, Cruel Romance alongside Huang Xiaoming. Cruel Romance achieved high ratings and was extremely popular during its run. Joe won the Best Actress in the Modern drama award at the 17th Huading Awards for her performance. Joe then starred in another period drama, Destined to Love You, written by Tong Hua. The same year, Joe returned to theater and reprised her role in The Woman on the Breadfruit Tree. She received acclaim for her performance, and was awarded Best Actress at the 4th Denny Awards. She also made a cameo appearance in the popular youth film, Our Times as the adult version of the female protagonist.

In 2016, Joe paired up with Wang Kai for modern romance drama Stay with Me, which she co-produced. She co-starred with Jin Dong in the web drama Candle in the Tomb, adapted from the novel Ghost Blows Out the Light. Candle in the Tomb was a critical success, and received acclaim for its performance and faithful adaptation.

In 2017, Joe starred alongside Tong Dawei in the romance comedy drama Love Actually, which topped ratings and trending topics during its run. She subsequently returned to the big screen with two films – action comedy Big Brother alongside Donnie Yen and romance film Let's Cheat Together where she played the role of a mistress alongside frequent co-star Ming Dao.

In 2019, Joe starred alongside Chen Xiao in the historical television series Queen Dugu, playing the role of Dugu Qieluo. The same year, she was cast as Di Wu, a pilot in the aviation TV series New Horizon. However, due to the influence of COVID-19, New Horizon finally released on 27 May 2021 on iQiyi, Youku, and Tencent.

== Personal life ==
Chen is Taiwanese Hakka from Hsinchu County. She has two brothers, one elder and one younger.

== Filmography ==
=== Film ===
Year	English title	Original title	Role	Notes
2011	The Allure of Tears	倾城之泪	Zhang Cai	
2012	Happiness Me Too	幸福迷途	Song Qi	
2014	The Monkey King	大闹天宫	Princess Iron Fan	
2014	The Suspicious	最佳嫌疑人	Angel	
2014	Breaking the Waves	激浪青春	Ruan Xiaoyue	
2014	The Continent	后会无期	Zhou Mo	
2015	The Queens	我是女王	Candy	
2015	Youth Never Returns	既然青春留不住	Zhou Hui	
2015	Our Times	我的少女時代	Lin Truly (adult)	Special appearance
2015	Return of the Cuckoo	十月初五的月光	Qi Qi	
2015	Forever Love	北京时间	Xue Yalan	
2017	Into the Rainbow	奇迹：追逐彩虹	Lian	
2018	Big Brother	大師兄	Liang Yingxin	
2018	Let's Cheat Together	市长夫人的秘密	Liao Yanling	
2023	Can you not please not leave me	可不可以 不要 离开 我	Lin Fang Fei	https://movie.douban.com/subject/35431671/
=== Television series === : Year / English title / Original title / Role / Network / Notes; 2001 / Lavender / 薰衣草 / Xiao Wei / SETTV; 2002 / My MVP Valentine / MVP 情人 / Fang Yixue / Barbie / SETTV; 2003 / 100% Senorita / 千金百分百 / Liang Xiaofeng / Zhuang Feiyang / SETTV; 2003 / / 老嫩大细 / Liu Jinxing / Hakka TV; 2004 / In Love with a Rich Girl / 爱上千金美眉 / Ai Bi (Albee) / TTV; 2004 / Red Woman is Flower / 红色女人花 / Luo Qiaoyun / FTV, ONTV; 2005 / The Doctor / 大熊医师家 / Xu Xiaoen / TTV, SETTV, CTS / Cameo; 2005 / Sugo / 所选择的那一位 / Mei Li / GMA Network / Cameo; 2005 / The Prince Who Turns into a Frog / 王子变青蛙 / Ye Tianyu / TTV, SETTV; 2006 / A Game About Love / 剪刀石头布 / Ye Duoli / CTS; 2007 / Ying Ye 3 Jia 1 / 樱野三加一 / Xia Tian / TTV, SETTV; 2008 / Fated to Love You / 命中注定我愛你 / Chen Xinyi / TTV, SETTV; 2008 / Woody Sambo / 无敌珊宝妹 / Chen Xinyi / TTV / Cameo; 2009 / Easy Fortune Happy Life / 福气又安康 / Xie Fuan / TTV, SETTV; 2009 / Let's Dance / 守着阳光守着你 / Ding Xiaohan / TTV, SETTV; 2010 / / 知县叶光明 / Piao Piao / CCTV / Cameo; 2010 / The Girl in Blue / 佳期如夢 / You Jiaqi / Hunan TV; 2011 / Youthful and Vibrant Zhu Nine Sister / 春光灿烂猪九妹 / Zhu Jiumei / Anhui TV; 2012 / The Queen of SOP / 胜女的代价 / Lin Xiaojie / Hunan TV; 2012 / Beauties of the Emperor / 王的女人 / Lu Yue / Empress Lu Zhi / Zhejiang TV, Shenzhen TV, Shanxi TV; 2013 / Swordsman / 笑傲江湖 / Dongfang Bubai / Hunan TV; 2015 / Cruel Romance / 锦绣缘华丽冒险 / Rong Jinxiu / Hunan TV; 2015 / Destined to Love You / 偏偏喜欢你 / Qian Baobao / Hunan TV; 2016 / Plastic Surgery Season / 整容季 / Wang Wenwen (Before) / Youku, Tudou / Cameo; 2016 / Marry a Husband / 嫁个老公过日子 / Chen Jiayu / CCTV-8; 2016 / Stay with Me / 放弃我抓紧我 / Li Weiwei / Hunan TV / also producer; 2016 / Candle in the Tomb / 鬼吹灯之精绝古城 / Shirley Yang / Tencent; 2017 / Love Actually / 人间至味是清欢 / An Qinghuan / Hunan TV; 2017 / The Legendary Tycoon / 传奇大亨 / Rose / Zhejiang TV / Special appearance; 2019 / Queen Dugu / 独孤皇后 / Dugu Jialuo / iQiyi, Tencent, Youku; 2021 / New Horizon / 壯志高飛 / Wu Di / iQiyi, Tencent, Youku; 2022 / Hello, My Shining Love / 遇见璀璨的你 / Dugu Ruonan / Tencent; == Discography == === Singles === : Year / English title / Original title / Album / Notes; 2006 / "2 Sweet" / —N/a / Magicians Of Love OST / with Ehlo Huang; 2006 / "Don't Understand" / 不明白 / Love Story of Romeo & Juliet / with K One; 2007 / "Actually You Understand Me" / 其实你懂我 / Ying Ye 3 Jia 1 OST; 2007 / "Unreasonable Girlfriend" / 野蛮女友 / Ying Ye 3 Jia 1 OST; 2007 / "Believe Once Again" / 再次相信 / Ying Ye 3 Jia 1 OST / with Ming Dao; 2012 / "Like to be Lonely" / 喜欢孤独 / The Queen of SOP OST; 2016 / "Yes I Do" / —N/a / Stay with Me OST; 2017 / / 可不可以不勇敢; == Publication == : Published Year / English title / Original title / Press Name / Published Date / ISBN / Number of Pages / Notes; 2007 / Strategy Guide of Adventure from Joe Chen and Sam Tseng / 《曾国城、陈乔恩之冒险攻略 -团康完全手册》 / 放电人文 / Aug. 2nd / ISBN 9789868353718 / 144; 2008 / Biography of Joe Chen / 《乔见没》 / 尖端出版社 / Apr. 4th / ISBN 9789571038339 / 96 / including Cool Version and Sweet Version; 2009 / Joe in Paris / 《乔见·巴黎》 / KATE Publishing / Jun. 26th / ISBN 9789866606489 / 192 / including common version and rationed version; 2009 / Joe in Paris (in simplified Chinese) / 《乔见·巴黎》（简体中文 第一版） / 北方妇女儿童出版社 / Aug. 1st / ISBN 9787538540567 / 165; 2011 / Joe & Cat / 《乔见·猫》 / KATE Publishing / Jun. 22nd / ISBN 9789866175299 / 176 / including common version and special version; 2013 / Joe & Cat (in simplified Chinese) / 《乔见·猫》（简体中文版） / 漓江出版社 / Apr. 1st / ISBN 9787540759773 / 171; 2013 / Joe in Paris II / 《乔见·巴黎》（简体中文 第二版） / 花城出版社 / Aug. 13th / ISBN 9787536068353 / 176; == Awards and nominations == : Year / Award / Category / Nominated work / Result / Ref.; 2008 / 43rd Golden Bell Awards / Best Actress / Fated to Love You / Nominated; 2010 / 4th Huading Awards / Best Actress (Contemporary Drama) / Fated to Love You / Won; 2012 / 8th Huading Awards / Best Actress (Youth Drama) / The Queen of SOP / Nominated; 2013 / 5th China TV Drama Awards / Most Popular Actress (Hong Kong/Taiwan) / Swordsman / Won; 2013 / 4th One Drama Presentation / Best New Actress / The Woman on the Breadfruit Tree / Won; 2015 / 17th Huading Awards / Best Actress (Revolution-Era Drama) / Cruel Romance / Won; 2015 / 12th China Movie Channel Awards / Best Actress / Youth Never Returns / Nominated; 2015 / 4th Denny Award for International Excellence in Theatrical Arts / Best Actress / The Woman on the Breadfruit Tree / Won; 2015 / 7th China TV Drama Awards / Most Commercially Valuable Actress / —N/a / Won; 2016 / 19th Huading Awards / Best Actress (Revolution-Era Drama) / Destined to Love You / Nominated; 2016 / 8th China TV Drama Awards / Most Influential Actress (Hong Kong/Taiwan) / Stay with Me / Won
