= 偏偏喜歡你 =

偏偏喜歡你 or 偏偏喜欢你, literally 'Just Loving You', may refer to:

- Destined to Love You, 2015 Chinese television series
- "Loving You Alone", Hong Kong track by Danny Chan released in August 1983
