= Qiao Renliang =

Chinese singer and actor (1987-2016)

- Born: October 15, 1987; Shanghai, China
- Died: September 16, 2016 (aged 28); Shanghai, China
- Education: Shanghai Dianji University
- Occupations: Singer; actor
- Years active: 2005–2016

Chinese name
- Traditional Chinese: 喬任梁
- Simplified Chinese: 乔任梁
Transcriptions
Standard Mandarin
- Hanyu Pinyin: Qiáo Rènliáng
- Musical career
- Also known as: Kimi Qiao
- Origin: China
- Genre: Mandopop
- Label: Warner Music China

Qiao Renliang (simplified Chinese: 乔任梁; traditional Chinese: 喬任梁; October 15, 1987 – September 16, 2016), also known as Kimi Qiao, was a Chinese singer and actor. He took part in the second season of talent show My Hero (加油好男儿) and finished as the runner-up in 2007. He released his first EP in 2008 before shifting his career to acting.

== Life ==
Qiao Renliang was born as the only son to a modest family in Shanghai on October 15, 1987. He graduated from Shanghai Dianji University (上海电机学院). Before the commencement of his singing career, Qiao was a track and field athlete who specialised in high jump events. He was a classmate of 110-meter hurdler Liu Xiang in primary school. Qiao won the National High Jump Competition in 2003.

Qiao's English nickname, Kimi, originates from his admiration of Finnish Formula 1 driver Kimi Räikkönen.

In 2005, Qiao participated in the "Golden Star" competition (金鹰之星) and became the winner of the "New Voice" segment. He also took part in the second season of My Hero and finished as runner-up in the 2007 competition.

In 2008, he released his first EP Start today (今天开始) which ranked top ten on the China Album Sales Chart. He was also chosen to sing the theme song of Windows 7 in the Asia-Pacific Region. Qiao also starred in numerous movies and television series.

On September 16, 2016, Qiao was found dead in his apartment on Qishun Road, Putuo District, Shanghai. The police concluded the cause of death was suicide by self inflicted wounds because of depression. He was 28.

On December 10, 2016, Warner Music China, Qiao's music label, released a posthumous album titled "KIMI". December 10 was deliberately chosen as the album's release date, due to two of Qiao's previous albums also being released on the same day in 2009 and 2012.

== Filmography ==
=== Film ===
Year	English Title	Chinese Title	Role
2009	One Night in Supermarket	夜·店	Li Junwei
2010	Wall Lords	战墙	A Hui
2011	Quit Smoking, Not Quit Drinking	戒烟不戒酒	Lin Hongxing
2011	Stop it, another day	别闹，改日	Zhao Xiaochen
2011	Whistle Loud	哨声嘹亮	
2011	Love Letter	情书	Xiao Feng
2011	One Step Away	爱有多久	Yang Yang
2011	Sleepless Fashion	与时尚同居	Wu Yang
2011	East Meets West	东成西就2011	Ju Ge
2011	A Big Deal	巨额交易	Liu Yijun
2012	Di Xiaojie Chronicles	狄小杰事件簿	Di Xiaojie
2012	11 Flowers	我11	Du Hongjun
2012	To Forgive	查无此人	Li Chun
2012	The Zodiac Mystery	十二星座离奇事件	Chen Xiaojun
2012	Good-For-Nothing Heroes	请叫我英雄	Peng Da
2013	Yue Chao	乐潮	Qi Gang
2013	Thousand City	千城	Qi Gang
2013	Night Night Night	夜夜夜	Di Xiaojie
2014	Night of Adventure	疯狂72小时	Tuoniao
2014	Night Mail	死亡邮件	Xiao Liang
2015	Magic Card	魔卡行动	A Zhi
2015	Surprise	万万没想到	Benboerba
2016	Never Gone	致青春·原来你还在这里	Shen Ju'an
2016	Days of Our Own	我们的十年	Guo Yuchen

=== Television ===
Year	English Title	Chinese Title	Role
2009	Go for It! The Prince of Tennis	加油！网球王子	Qi Yuan
2010	New One Plum Blossom	新一剪梅	Xing Zhengyang
2011	Sunny Piggy Jiumei	春光灿烂猪九妹	Sun Wukong
2012	The Glamorous Imperial Concubine	倾世皇妃	Emperor Taizu of Song
2012	My Economical Man	我的经济适用男	Yang Fan
2013	Legend of Lu Zhen	陆贞传奇	Gao Yan
2013	DBI	新神探联盟之包大人来了	Bai Yutang
2013	The Queen of SOP 2	胜女的代价2	Bai Jiawei
2014	Love Is Back	爱情回来了	Cheng Lei
2014	Tiny Time	小时代之折纸时代	Zhou Chongguang
2015	Cruel Romance	锦绣缘华丽冒险	Xiang Yingdong
2015	Tour Between Two Lovers	向幸福出发	Ren Yifan
2015	Code Name	代号	Feng Jiusi
2016	Customize Happiness	定制幸福	Zhan Wang
2016	Stay with Me	放弃我，抓紧我	Huo Xiao
2018	The Snow Queen	雪女王	Shen Leizhi

=== Variety show ===
Year	Title	Role	Notes
2015	We Are In Love	Cast member	Xu Lu

== Discography ==
- Start Today (今天开始, 2008)
- The Lovely You (可爱的你, 2009)
- Diamond (钻石, December 10, 2009)
- Pin.K (Pin.K/拼, December 10, 2012)
- Excellent (耀·出色, 2014)
- KIMI (December 10, 2016), released posthumously
