= Candle in the Tomb (TV series) =

- Genre: Action, Adventure, Mystery, Supernatural, Thriller
- Based on: Ghost Blows Out the Light by Zhang Muye
- Written by: Zhang Muye; Bai Yicong
- Directed by: Kong Sheng
- Starring: Jin Dong; Joe Chen; Zhao Da
- Ending theme: Flowing Down (顺流而下) by Jane Zhang
- Country of origin: China
- Original language: Mandarin
- No. of episodes: 21

Production
- Producer: Hou Hongliang
- Running time: 35 minutes
- Production companies: Daylight Entertainment; Tencent Penguin Pictures; Dream Author

Original release
- Network: Tencent Video
- Release: 19 December 2016

Candle in the Tomb (Chinese: 鬼吹灯之精绝古城) is a 2016 Chinese streaming television series based on the novel Ghost Blows Out the Light by Tianxia Bachang (Zhang Muye). It is directed by Kong Sheng, produced by Hou Hongliang and stars Jin Dong, Joe Chen and Zhao Da. It tells the story of a gang of tomb raiders as they go on adventures and unearth the truth behind a mysterious curse. The drama aired 3 episodes every Monday at 20:00 on Tencent Video from 19 December 2016.

The series received acclaim for its exciting and fast-paced storyline, actors' performance as well as staying true to the novel. It surpassed 200 million views in one day and has over 1.6 billion views in total.

== Plot ==
A former soldier named Hu Bayi meets an old comrade, Wang Kaixuan and seeks out a living by reselling cassette tapes. While helping Wang retrieve a piece of jade from an antiques merchant nicknamed Big Golden Tooth. During the faceoff, Hu's heirloom compass that belonged to a long lineage of tomb raiders was noticed by Big Golden Tooth and Hu and Wang were persuaded to explore the possibility of an alternative job by reselling unearthing antiques as tomb raiders. They later join an archaeological team sponsored by Shirley Yang to find the location of the mysterious ancient city of Jingjue in a desert region, stopping by the Kunlun glaciers and braving the black sandstorms in the process.

== Cast ==
Actor	Character	Description
Jin Dong	Hu Bayi	A former soldier who becomes a tomb raider by chance. He acquired specialized knowledge on how to find a grand tomb through fengshui by a book inherited from his grandfather whom also happened to be a tomb raider during his younger days. He is charismatic and well versed in both astrology and fengshui.
Joe Chen	Shirley Yang	A wealthy American-born Chinese who works as a photojournalist for National Geographic. Resourceful and calm, she is the main financial sponsor of the archaeological group to search for the ancient city of Jingjue. Unknowingly, Hu Bayi has good affinity with Shirley Yang and always managed to get the group to safety with their teamwork.
Zhao Da	Wang Kaixuan	Hu Bayi's best friend and right-hand man. Wang is loud, uncouth and greedy at the thought and sight of precious items. His unwillingness to part with potential riches has gotten everyone in trouble more than once throughout the expedition. However, he is definitely the person that Hu Bayi depends on the most during critical moments. An unsung hero that always handled the unseen, minor yet important issues for the group's safety and wellness.
Yue Yang	Big Golden Tooth	An antique dealer who became friends with Hu Bayi and Wang Kaixuan. He is the main influencer to encourage Hu Bayi to use his secret knowledge of fengshui to make a living as a tomb raider. Big Golden Tooth is also the person who referred Hu Bayi and Wang Kaixuan to join Professor Chen's expedition to search for the ancient city of Jingjue in the Black Desert.
Wang Yongquan	An Liman	An Liman is of Han descendant but leads a nomadic life and was known to be a living map of the desert. He was once saved by a holy white camel in the desert after a sandstorm had dispersed his comrades and his camels became his most important possession in his life. With Professor Chen's entourage and Hu Bayi, he was hired to assist in the search for the ancient city of Jingjue in the Black Desert. Extremely self-preserving and greedy, An joined the group with the promise of a handsome monetary reward and was initially always ready to leave the group and flee at the slightest sign of danger. However, he struck an unlikely friendship with Hu Bayi. Although An Liman ultimately refused to enter the ancient city due to his belief that the death of Professor Hao is an ominous sign, he fulfilled his promise to Hu Bayi to wait outside for their group's return.
Yang Xinming	Professor Chen	Professor Chen is a highly educated archaeologist, antique expert and the expedition leader of the archaeological team. During the expedition, he was able to explain the various relics and strange creatures found in the archaeological process. Unfortunately, due to the deaths of the team and mental shocks experienced through the ordeals of the expedition, Professor Chen ended up losing his mind.
Feng Hui	Hao Aiguo	Hao Aiguo is a professor of archaeology and student of Professor Chen who has a strong drive to find and protect archaeological finds. He accompanied Professor Chen's archaeological team to find the ancient city, responsible for the logistical preparation of the entire archaeological expedition. At first, he disliked the presence of Hu Bayi & Wang Kaixuan due to the large number of unqualified people who applied to join the archaeological team, but was soon convinced after he heard Hu Bayi's concise explanation on the theories of geomancy and Feng Shui that his ancestors had left behind. Unfortunately, whilst attempting to remove a water canteen from a corpse of the foreigner group that reached the entrance of the ancient city before them, he was bitten on the neck by a serpent, dying instantly before the group reached the ancient city. The group buried him at the entrance of the ancient city in the hopes that he would watch over the ruins in the afterlife.
Kuang Muye	Sa Dipeng	Sa Dipeng is an eager, bespectacled student of Hao Aiguo and Professor Chen. He believes that extraterrestrials exists. While documenting and exploring the interior of the ancient city of Jingjue, he was affected by the hallucinogenic properties of the Corpse Insense Yam and attacked Chu Jian with his flashlight, after which, he cracked his skull open and died. Later, it was revealed that Sa, Chu and Ye did not venture into the underground passageway of the ancient city of Jingjue and were all alive, and the deaths of the three were all just a hallucination, leaving Hu Bayi in confusion
Jin Zehao	Chu Jian	Chu Jian is an eager student of Hao Aiguo and Professor Chen. While documenting and exploring the interior of the ancient city of Jingjue, Sa Dipeng was affected by the hallucinogenic properties of the Corpse Insense Yam and attacked Chu Jian with his flashlight. Chu Jian lost his balance and fell over a cliff into the void, never to be seen again. Later, it was revealed that Sa, Chu and Ye did not venture into the underground passageway of the ancient city of Jingjue and were all alive, and the deaths of the three were all just a hallucination, leaving Hu Bayi in confusion.
Fu Mei	Ye Yixin	Ye Yixin is an eager student of Hao Aiguo and Professor Chen. As the only female student of the team, she is doted upon by the other members of the group. Physically weak, her physical condition deteriorates through the course of the expedition, suffering from heat exhaustion and dehydration till their arrival at the ancient city. Inside, the repeated mental shocks from her teammates death took a toll on her declining physical health and she died from shock. During the collapse of a burial chamber, her body was then buried by the fallen rubble. Later, it was revealed that Sa, Chu and Ye did not venture into the underground passageway of the ancient city of Jingjue and were all alive, and the deaths of the three were all just a hallucination, leaving Hu Bayi in confusion.
Zhang Yishang	Ying Zi	The granddaughter of the village chief in Hu Bayi's and Wang Kaixuan's village. She is an accomplished hunter who is extremely proficient with a rifle. She accompanied Hu Bayi and Wang Kaixuan on their first tomb exploratory attempt. Although she is brave, she is uncomfortable with the ancient rituals found in the tomb and was spooked by the supernatural events that occurred within the tomb.

== Awards and nominations ==
Year	Award	Category	Nominated	Result	Ref.
2017	2nd Golden Guduo Media Awards	Most Influential Web Series	Candle in the Tomb	Won	
2017	2nd Golden Guduo Media Awards	Best Director	Kong Sheng	Won	
2017	2nd Asia New Media Film Festival	Jury Grand Prize	Candle in the Tomb	Won	
2017	2nd Asia New Media Film Festival	Most Popular Web Series	Candle in the Tomb	Won	
