= Stay with Me (2016 TV series) =

- Also known as: Abandon Me, Hold Me Tight
- Genre: Romance; Drama
- Created by: Tong Hua
- Written by: Qian Jingjing; Xu Ziyuan; Jiang Guangyu
- Directed by: Billy Tang; Ruan Weixin; Chen Guohua
- Starring: Joe Chen; Wang Kai
- Opening theme: Stay with Me by Jin Zhiwen
- Ending theme: When Love Comes Knocking by Zhang Bichen
- Country of origin: China
- Original language: Mandarin
- No. of episodes: 39

Production
- Executive producer: Yu Yi
- Producers: Tang Panjing; Wang Li; Chen Ying; Joe Chen
- Production locations: China, France
- Running time: 69.1 minutes
- Production companies: Dream Stardom Film and TV Culture Co., Ltd

Original release
- Network: Hunan TV
- Release: 11 December 2016 – 2 January 2017

Stay with Me (Chinese: 放弃我, 抓紧我; pinyin: Fàngqì Wǒ, Zhuājǐn Wǒ; lit. 'Give Up On Me Hold On To Me') is a 2016 Chinese television series starring Joe Chen and Wang Kai. The series aired on Hunan TV from 11 December 2016 to 2 January 2017. Streaming rights outside mainland China are owned by Zhong Ju Du Bo.

== Synopsis ==
Due to a near-drowning accident, Li Weiwei (Joe Chen) a famous fashion designer, loses parts of her memory. After she wakes up, her memory begins at the age of 23. The boyfriend in her memory, Chen Yidu (Wang Kai), is now her rival at work, while her childhood best friend, Huo Xiao (Kimi Qiao), is now her fiancé. Weiwei does not believe that she broke up with Yidu and investigates the reason to as why they did. Afraid of losing her and trying to protect her, Huo Xiao tries to hinder her plan in every possible way. After she recalls the full picture, she realizes that busy lives had kept her and her loved ones from the dream they once pursued so passionately. As confrontations and misunderstandings piled up, Yidu broke up with her. At the age of 30, Weiwei is determined to change the way things are going, erasing misunderstandings from the past, erasing conflicts between them, never stopping until she finds love and the dream and heart she once possessed.

== Cast ==
=== Main ===
- Joe Chen (v. Ji Guanlin) as Li Weiwei (Vivian)
  - 30 years old, Chief Designer of Ling Long. After an accident, her memory gets stuck at 23 years old.
- Wang Kai (v. Chen Yidu) as Wang Kai
  - 35 years old, CEO of Du. Weiwei's ex-boyfriend.
- Qiao Renliang (v. Huo Xiao) as Ling Zhenhe
  - 32 years old, CEO of Ling Long. Weiwei's childhood friend and fiance.
- Chen Ran (v. Bai Xue) as Tian Jinfeng (Tiffany)
  - 31 years old, Chief Designer of Du. She has an unrequited crush on Yidu.
- Derek Chang as Zhang Li'ao (Leo)
  - 24 years old, a famous international supermodel. He is Weiwei's adopted orphan brother.

=== Supporting ===
- Zhang Duo as Mo Fan
  - Wall's Street Investor. Yidu's good friend and brother.
- Tse Kwan-ho as Huo Ruiqiang
  - Huo Xiao's father, CEO of Ling Long
- Miao Haizhong as Huo Ruiyong
  - Huo Xiao's uncle. He aspires to topple over Weiwei and take over her position as Chief Designer.
- Cao Ranran as Ou Ye, Huo Xiao's secretary. He likes Zhen Ni.
- Liu Mengmeng as Zhen Ni, Weiwei's assistant. She looks up to and admires Weiwei.
- Guo Junhao as Cao Zhong, Yidu's assistant.
- Wang Xiaomao as Su Fei, Weiwei's subordinate.
- Zheng Long as Qiao Zhi, Weiwei's subordinate.
- Fu Jia as Lao Wan, Weiwei's subordinate.
- Du Yuting as Secretary Zhu, Huo Ruiyong's assistant.
- Qi Hang as Kang Xing
  - A spy who works at Ling Long as the marketing manager, in order to harm Weiwei and destroy her relationships with Yidu and Huo Xiao.
- Zhao Zimo as Secretary Wang, he helps Huo Xiao to investigate Weiwei's accident in Paris.
- Du Ninglin as Yidu's mother

== Soundtrack ==
Stay with Me OST
No.	Title	Singer	Length
1.	"Stay with Me (放棄我，抓緊我)" (Opening theme song)	Jin Zhiwen
2.	"When Love Comes Knocking (当爱来敲门)" (Ending theme song)	Zhang Bichen
3.	"Yes, I do" (Insert song)	Joe Chen
4.	"Warmth (暖人)" (Insert song)	Zhang Lei

== Ratings ==
Episode #	Original air date	Average audience share (CSM52)		Ranking (timeslot)	Average audience share (National Average)		Ranking (timeslot)
Episode #	Original air date	Ratings	Audience share	Ranking (timeslot)	Ratings	Audience share	Ranking (timeslot)
1-2	December 11, 2016	1.233	3.712%	1	1.5	4.74%	1
3-4	December 12, 2016	1.241	3.827%	1	1.45	4.61%	1
5-6	December 13, 2016	1.399	4.313%	1	1.59	5.07%	1
7-8	December 14, 2016	1.412	4.301%	1	1.66	5.21%	1
9-10	December 15, 2016	1.512	4.649%	1	1.68	5.27%	1
11	December 16, 2016	1.034	3.07%	2	1.58	4.36%	1
12	December 17, 2016	1.309	3.87%	1	1.91	5.37%	1
13-14	December 18, 2016	1.469	4.44%	1	1.95	6.18%	1
15-16	December 19, 2016	1.509	4.59%	1	1.89	6.15%	1
17-18	December 20, 2016	1.409	4.23%	1	1.78	5.62%	1
19-20	December 21, 2016	1.421	4.29%	1	1.86	5.80%	1
21-22	December 22, 2016	1.345	4.12%	1	1.77	5.68%	1
23	December 23, 2016	1.019	3.01%	2	1.69	4.77%	1
24	December 24, 2016	1.032	3.11%	2	1.71	4.93%	1
25-26	December 25, 2016	1.4	4.14%	1	1.94	5.93%	1
27-28	December 26, 2016	1.506	4.487%	1	1.93	6.08%	1
29-30	December 27, 2016	1.451	4.36%	1	1.62	5.11%	1
31-32	December 28, 2016	1.442	4.383%	1	1.86	5.86%	1
33-34	December 29, 2016	1.484	4.55%	1	1.87	5.92%	1
35	December 30, 2016	1.203	3.606%	1	-	-	-
36-37	December 31, 2016	1.911	5.456%	1	3.01	8.72%	1
38	January 2, 2017	1.525	4.392%	1	2.17	6.34%	1
Average		1.419	4.27%		-	-	-

- Highest ratings are marked in red, lowest ratings are marked in blue

Stay With Me ranked in the top ten highest rated television dramas of 2016.
