= Chronicles of the Ghostly Tribe =

- Traditional Chinese: 九層妖塔
- Simplified Chinese: 九层妖塔
- Hanyu Pinyin: Jiǔcéng Yāotǎ
- Directed by: Lu Chuan
- Written by: Lu Chuan; Zhang Muye; Bobby Roth; Nick Roth
- Based on: Ghost Blows Out the Light by Zhang Muye
- Starring: Mark Chao; Yao Chen; Rhydian Vaughan; Li Chen; Tiffany Tang; Daniel Feng
- Cinematography: Cao Yu
- Music by: Jesper Kyd
- Production company: China Film Group Corporation
- Distributed by: LeTV
- Release date: 30 September 2015
- Running time: 115 minutes
- Country: China
- Language: Mandarin
- Box office: US$106 million

Chronicles of the Ghostly Tribe (Chinese: 九层妖塔) is a 2015 Chinese 3D adventure action film directed and co-written by Lu Chuan, and stars Mark Chao, Yao Chen, Rhydian Vaughan, Li Chen, Tiffany Tang and Daniel Feng. The film is an adaptation of Zhang Muye's 2006 best-selling novel Ghost Blows Out the Light. Chronicles of the Ghostly Tribe was released in China on September 30, 2015.

== Synopsis ==
In 1979, a young soldier is working in China's snow capped Kunlun Mountains when an explosion reveals bizarre fossils hidden deep in the mountain caverns. What they discover next will change his life and human history forever.

== Cast ==
- Mark Chao as Hu Bayi, former soldier/adventurer.
- Yao Chen as Yang Ping/Shirley Yang, daughter of Professor Yang.
- Rhydian Vaughan as Chen Dong, scientist/student of Professor Yang.
- Li Chen as Mr. Wang/President Wang, librarian/guardian of Prince Yi's mausoleum.
- Tiffany Tang as Cao Weiwei.
- Daniel Feng as Wang Kaixuan, locally famous singer & childhood friend of Hu Bayi.
- Li Guangjie as Han Jiuyang.
- Wang Qingxiang as Professor Yang, archaeologist/expert on the Demon Temple & ghostly tribe.
- Wu Jun
- Wang Deshun as An Liman, a geographer.

== Production ==
This film was shot in Gansu.

Chronicles of the Ghostly Tribe's photographer was Cao Yu, who is Yao Chen's husband.

== Release ==
The film was released in theaters in China on September 30, 2015.

== Reception ==
The film made US$14.2 million on its opening day in China on Wednesday, September 30, 2015 placing first at the daily box office. During its opening weekend, it earned US$34 million ranking second at the Chinese box office behind Lost in Hong Kong.
