= Cao Yu (cinematographer) =

Chinese cinematographer

- 曹郁
- Born: August 15, 1974 (age 52); Beijing, China
- Education: Beijing Film Academy
- Occupation: Cinematographer
- Years active: 1997–present
- Spouse: Yao Chen (m. 2012–2026)
- Children: 2

Chinese name
- Traditional Chinese: 曹鬱
- Simplified Chinese: 曹郁
Transcriptions
Standard Mandarin
- Hanyu Pinyin: Cáo Yù

Signature
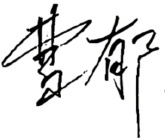

Cao Yu (Chinese: 曹郁; born August 15, 1974) is a Chinese cinematographer best known for his work on City of Life and Death, Kekexili: Mountain Patrol, and See You Tomorrow. As a cinematographer, he became famous for his three collaborations with director Lu Chuan. In June 2025, Cao was invited to join the Cinematographers Branch of the Academy of Motion Picture Arts and Sciences.

== Early life and education ==
Cao was born on August 15, 1974, in Beijing. After graduating from Beijing Film Academy in 1997, he was assigned to Beijing Film Studio. When he was a college student, his greatest interest was to study equipment and Library. American Cinematographer was Cao's favorite magazine that he borrowed from the university library. When he saw an article that he was interested in, he would copy it.

== Career ==
Cao made his feature film debut with the 1997 comedy film Run Away, which earned him a Youth Film Fund award at the 54th Cannes Film Festival.

In 2001, he shot the feature film Chicken Poets, and won a Special Jury Prize at the Locarno Film Festival. That same year, he began to shot advertisement films.

In 2004, he shot Lu Chuan's Kekexili: Mountain Patrol, for which he received the Best Cinematography nomination at the 25th Golden Rooster Awards and received the Best Cinematography at the 41st Golden Horse Awards.

In 2009, Cao went on to serve as cinematographer for City of Life and Death, his second collaboration with director Lu Chuan. He won numerous awards, including the Best Cinematography at the 57th San Sebastian International Film Festival, the Best Cinematography at the 46th Golden Horse Awards, the Best Cinematography at the 4th Asian Film Awards, and the Best Cinematography at the 3rd Asia Pacific Screen Awards.

Cao was cinematographer for the 2010 romantic comedy film Color Me Love.

In 2012, he collaborated with Yang Shupeng on the action film An Inaccurate Memoir.

In 2015, he was selected as cinematographer for the 3D adventure action film Chronicles of the Ghostly Tribe, his third collaborated with director Lu Chuan.

In 2017, Cao won the Best Cinematography at the 36th Hong Kong Film Awards for his work in See You Tomorrow, and was nominated for Best Cinematography at the 54th Golden Horse Awards.

== Personal life ==
In March 2011, Cao Yu began dating actress Yao Chen after they met in Color Me Love. On November 18, 2012, they married in Queenstown, New Zealand. On July 15, 2013, their son, nicknamed Xiao Tudou (Chinese: 小土豆; lit. 'small potato'), was born in Beijing. Their daughter, nicknamed Xiao Moli (Chinese: 小茉莉; lit. 'little jasmine'), was born on November 9, 2016. On March 16, 2026, Yao announced on Weibo that she had divorced Cao many years ago.

== Film ==
Year	English Title	Chinese title	Director	Notes
1997	Run Away	待避		
2002	Chicken Poets	像鸡毛一样飞	Meng Jinghui	
2004	Kekexili: Mountain Patrol	可可西里	Lu Chuan	
2009	City of Life and Death	南京！南京！	Lu Chuan	
2010	Color Me Love	爱出色	Chen Yili	
2010	Driverless	无人驾驶	Zhang Yang	
2011	The Law of Attraction	万有引力	Zhao Tianyu	
2012	An Inaccurate Memoir	匹夫	Yang Shupeng	
2015	Chronicles of the Ghostly Tribe	鬼吹灯之九层妖塔	Lu Chuan	
2017	See You Tomorrow	摆渡人	Zhang Jiajia	
2017	Legend of the Demon Cat	妖猫传	Chen Kaige	
2018	Forever Young	无问西东	Li Fangfang	
2019	My People, My Country	我和我的祖国	Chen Kaige	
2024	Decoded	解密	Chen Sicheng	
2026	Traces of Justice	神探之痕迹	Chen Sicheng	

== Awards and nominations ==
Date	Award	Category	Recipient(s) and nominee(s)	Result	Ref.
2004	41st Golden Horse Awards	Best Cinematography	Kekexili: Mountain Patrol	Won	
2005	25th Golden Rooster Awards	Best Cinematography	Kekexili: Mountain Patrol	Nominated	
2009	57th San Sebastian International Film Festival	Best Cinematography	City of Life and Death	Won	
2009	46th Golden Horse Awards	Best Cinematography	City of Life and Death	Won	
2009	3rd Asia Pacific Screen Awards	Best Cinematography	City of Life and Death	Won	
2010	4th Asian Film Awards	Best Cinematography	City of Life and Death	Won	
2017	36th Hong Kong Film Awards	Best Cinematography	See You Tomorrow	Won	
2017	54th Golden Horse Awards	Best Cinematography	See You Tomorrow	Nominated	
2018	10th Macau International Movie Festival	Best Cinematography	Forever Young	Nominated	
2018	12th Asian Film Awards	Best Cinematography	Legend of the Demon Cat	Nominated	
2018	17th Huabiao Awards	Best Cinematography	Legend of the Demon Cat	Won	
2019	32nd Golden Rooster Awards	Best Cinematography	Legend of the Demon Cat	Won	
2021	34th Golden Rooster Awards	Best Cinematography	1921	Nominated	
2021	16th Changchun Film Festival	Best Cinematography	1921	Nominated	
