= Cruel Romance =

Chinese television series

- Genre: Romance; Action; Republican
- Created by: The Fate of Jinxiu by Yu Yi
- Written by: Yuan Shuai
- Directed by: Lin Helong
- Starring: Huang Xiaoming; Joe Chen; Kimi Qiao; Lv Jiarong; Tse Kwan-ho; Qi Ji
- Opening theme: Fate by Huang Xiaoming
- Ending theme: Circumstances Changes with Time by Shen Yisha
- Country of origin: China
- Original language: Mandarin
- No. of episodes: 40

Production
- Executive producers: Huan Ming; Huang Bin
- Production location: China
- Running time: 45 minutes
- Production companies: Asian Palm Film; Huang Xiao Ming Studios

Original release
- Network: Hunan TV
- Release: 3 March – 26 March 2015

Cruel Romance
- Simplified Chinese: 锦绣缘华丽冒险
Transcriptions
Standard Mandarin
- Hanyu Pinyin: Jin Siu Yuan Hua Li Mao Xian

Cruel Romance (Chinese: 锦绣缘华丽冒险) is a 2015 Chinese television series starring Huang Xiaoming and Joe Chen. It is based on the republican novel The Fate of Jinxiu (锦绣缘) by Yu Yi. The series aired on Hunan TV from 3 March to 26 March 2015.

The series is a commercial success, and became second highest rated television drama for the first half of 2015. It also has over 5 billion views online. Broadcasting rights of the drama were sold to America, Malaysia, Thailand, Hong Kong and Vietnam.

== Synopsis ==
Set in the 1930s, Rong Jinxiu (Joe Chen) was born in a renowned medical family. When her father saves her teacher Mr Chen from a gunshot wound, her entire family was killed by the Japanese. With only a piece of watch as evidence, Jin Xiu heads to Shanghai to search for her enemies. On the ferry there, she meets the famous triad leader Zuo Zhen (Huang Xiaoming) of Shanghai's Huang Pu commerce. Through some entanglement, the watch ends up with Zuo Zhen. In order to retrieve her watch, Jin Xiu heads to Bai Le dance hall to look for him. There, she meets her long-lost half-sister Yin Mingzhu (Lv Jiarong), who is currently a famous dancer and the lover of Shanghai's wealthiest businessman, Xiang Hanchuan (Tse Kwan-ho). However, Ming Zhu still harbours hatred for the Rong family because they abandoned Mingzhu and her sickly mother many years before.

At the dance hall, Jin Xiu gets injured in the midst of a fight between Zuo Zhen and his enemies. Zuo Zhen rescues her and then brings her to Lion Forest hotel, which he had gifted to Xiang Yingdong, the brother of Xiang Hanchuan. While Zuo Zhen finds Jin Xiu annoying, he can't help but find himself attracted towards her and keeps helping her in the shadows, making sure that she is safe and comfortable in Shanghai. Jin Xiu remains clueless and continues to believe that the comfort and safety she has is because of sheer luck.

With all that happening, Mr Maeda, the one behind the murder of Jin Xiu's family, came to Shanghai posed as a businessman from Japan, with plans to execute all the anti-Japanese rebel groups in Shanghai and make Shanghai's business Japan's.

== Cast ==
=== Main ===
- Huang Xiaoming as Zuo Zhen
  - Also known as Second Master. Leader of the Freedom Fighter triad. Calm, composed and sharp, Zuo Zhen is cold and indifferent to women. However, the appearance of Jinxiu changes that.
- Joe Chen as Rong Jinxiu / Ohno Yoko
  - Determined, pure and kind-hearted. Jinxiu learnt medicine from her father since young, and is a skilled physician. After her parents' death, she comes to Shanghai alone to find out the truth, gaining independence and wisdom throughout her journey.
- Kimi Qiao as Xiang Yingdong
  - Also known as Master Ying. Gentle and humorous, he has sought independence since young, but is overshadowed by his brother. After losing his beloved woman Mingzhu to his brother, he hides his inner pain and struggles by being a playboy. He subsequently falls in love with Jinxiu and comes into conflict with Zuo Zhen.
- Lv Jiarong as Yin Mingzhu
  - Jinxiu's half-sister. Because of her mother's death, she is consumed by the desire of revenge and becomes the Japanese's puppet. She loves Yingdong but has no choice but to be with Hanchuan to complete her mission.
- Tse Kwan-ho as Xiang Hanchuan
  - CEO of the Xiang Enterprise. A loyal and faithful man. He discovers Zuo Zhen's potential and grooms him into a capable man. Having accidentally snatched his younger brother's lover Mingzhu, he feels deeply apologetic toward him and thus is willing to condone all his wrongdoings.
- Qi Ji as Maeda Ryuichi
  - A cold and cruel militarist who would resort to anything for his country. Because of his lowly position, he had no choice but to watch his lover Yang Zi being killed. When he comes to Shanghai and discovers Yang Zi's look-a-like Jinxiu, he resorts to all sorts of methods to win her over.

=== Supporting ===
- Zhang Zi as Boss Wang, Hao Wang Dance Hall's boss
- Cai Juntao as Tang Hai
  - Zuo Zhen's left-hand man and close friend. He was beaten crippled by Long Si, and later died with Xiaoze Yasha.
- Yang Le as Shi Hao
  - Zuo Zhen's right-hand man and close friend. Stays by Long Si's side as a spy to help Zuo Zhen.
- Xie Wenxuan as Jin Ling, Ming Zhu's confidante. She likes Zuo Zhen.
- Mark Du as Muto Oda, Japanese spy, Maeda Ryuichi's teacher
- Hao Zejia as Ozawa Asa, Japanese spy
- He Hongshan as Shen Meng, Daughter of Shen Jinrong. Innocent and kind. She loves Xiang Yingdong.
- Yoyiki Una as Xiao Lan, An employee at Hotel Lion Forest, Jinxiu's close friend. She later gets together with Tang Hai.
- Feng Peng as Long Si, Zuo Zhen's rival
- Zhao Zhongwei as Mr Feng, CEO of Huang Pu commerce
- Tong Chenjie as Lin Meihua, CEO of Mei Hua company
- Zhang Jian as Zhao Hui, Zuo Zhen's underling
- Zhang Tianye as Ma Ziliu, Zuo Zhen's underling
- Wei Qing as Anna, a dancer at Hao Wang dance hall and Jinxiu's close friend.
- Yu Jieqi as Songben Cilang, Maeda Ryuichi's underling
- Li Ji as Ling Li, Meihua's younger cousin. He falls at first sight for Jinxiu.
- Mei Nianjia as Liu Yi, son of the Chief Police, Police Staff Sergeant.
- Wang Min as Police Chief
- Xiao Che as Zhou Mu, Zuo Zhen and Meihua's good friend. He helped introduce Jinxiu to Meihua Company.
- Cao Wan as Shen Jinrong, A rich businessman
- Cui Xinqin as Rong Xinru, Jinxiu's mother, Yin Xinping's younger sister
- Li Jianyi as Rong Qingyuan, Jinxiu and Mingzhu's father
- Jin Jia as Chang Sheng, Jinxiu's teacher
- Xu Xing as Yin Xinping, Mingzhu's mother
- Li Yilin as Yun Qiubao, Yingdong's classmate who asks him to retrieve the pocket watch from Jinxiu
- Meng Zhen as Du Ping, Anna's lover
- Xia Zhiliu as Qin Hao
- Liu Shan as Mad Girl
- Zhou Yunshen as Assistant He
- Liu Xiaoxue as Yin Di, Mingzhu's maid
- Zhou Hong as Manager Hu, Hotel Lion Forest's employee
- Li Zigan as person who was bribed by Maeda Ryuichi to lie to Jinxiu that he is her parents' murderer
- Jiang Feng as Pervert, Mingzhu's admirer
- Luo Zhenhuan as Ah Bi, Hotel Lion Forest's employee. Collaborated with Manager Hu to frame Jinxiu.
- Cao Yanyan as Chen Xiangmei, Manager of Mei Hua company. Ordered by Jin Ling to frame Jinxiu.
- Fan Guolun as Uncle Chen
- Liu Wei as Sister Yao, Employee of Mei Hua company, Jinxiu's superior.
- Xiao Yongjia as Ah Tao, Lao Ma's daughter
- Wan Shengli as Lao Ma, Zuo Zhen's underling who becomes addicted to heroin
- Meng Lingchao as Shou Zai
- Zhang Xiangyu as Fang Ting
- Kun Ao as Zhou Qian
- Ji Limin as Mother Xu
- Zhang Jiayou as Wang Qing
- Liang Jingjing as Liu Xiaoxiao
  - Shanghai's biggest celebrity. She disguises herself as Mei Hua company's endorser, helping the freedom fighters to carry out their tasks. Maeda Ryuchi drop her from a high building.
- Wang Guojing as Uncle Wang
- Bao Aoma as Fei Dinan
- An Long as Church Priest
- Ya Mi as Bao Luo
- Huang Jinsheng as Landlord Ding
- Wang Jincheng as Ah Gui
- Sheng Kengjie as Ah Min
- Yi Fei as Dancer
- Ling Haiming as Zuo Zhen's father
- Yin Qianru as Zuo Zhen's mother
- Li Min as Head of Labor
- He Feng as Yue Fen
- Xu Jiehao as Secretary Zhong
- Sun Qiusheng as Boss Chang
- Ke Su as Chen Keke

== Soundtrack ==
Title	Singer
Fate (緣)	Huang Xiaoming
Circumstances Changes with Time (时过境迁)	Shen Yisha
Love is a Faith (爱是信仰)	Edison Lin
Wrong Love (錯愛)	Liu Tao
Madness (瘋)	Jovi Theng
Lightly (輕輕)	Cao Xuanbin
Think Too Beautifully (想得太美)	Zhang Qian
At Least We Loved Before (至少愛過)	Rynn Lim

== Ratings ==
Hunan TV Ratings
Broadcast date	Episode	CSM50 City ratings			National Internet ratings		
Broadcast date	Episode	Ratings (%)	Audience share (%)	Rank	Ratings (%)	Audience share (%)	Rank
March 3, 2015	1-2	1.52	4.103	1	2.67	7.35	1
March 4, 2015	3-4	1.722	4.708	1	3.30	9.17	1
March 6, 2015	5	1.185	3.303	1	2.74	7.73	1
March 7, 2015	6	1.283	3.628	1	2.74	7.73	1
March 8, 2015	7-8	1.942	5.337	1	3.28	9.44	1
March 9, 2015	9-10	1.944	5.377	1	3.44	9.98	1
March 10, 2015	11-12	2.084	5.716	1	3.37	9.62	1
March 11, 2015	13-14	2.026	5.619	1	3.51	10.04	1
March 12, 2015	15-16	2.161	6.014	1	3.63	10.36	1
March 13, 2015	17	1.505	4.215	1	3.07	8.58	1
March 14, 2015	18	1.695	4.824	1	3.07	8.58	1
March 15, 2015	19-20	2.09	5.64	1	3.07	8.58	1
March 16, 2015	21-22	2.002	5.661	1	3.44	10.08	1
March 17, 2015	23-24	2.156	5.998	1	3.76	10.81	1
March 18, 2015	25-26	2.04	5.685	1	3.65	10.54	1
March 19, 2015	27-28	2.037	5.622	1	3.47	9.84	1
March 20, 2015	29	1.333	3.854	1	-	-	1
March 21, 2015	30	1.403	4.238	1	-	-	1
March 22, 2015	31-32	2.122	5.767	1	3.51	10.10	1
March 23, 2015	33-34	2.181	6.194	1	3.7	10.79	1
March 24, 2015	35-36	2.328	6.648	1	3.8	11.16	1
March 25, 2015	37-38	2.451	7.026	1	4.10	11.80	1
March 26, 2015	39-40	2.601	7.489	1	4.33	12.73	1
Average ratings		1.994	5.55	1	-	-	-

- Highest ratings are marked in red, lowest ratings are marked in blue

== International broadcast ==
Channel	Country	Date	Notes
KTSF	United States	April 9, 2015	
8TV	Malaysia	May 28, 2015	
True Asian HD	Thailand	July 12, 2015	
OMNI.2 (ON)	Canada	August 3, 2015	
OMNI AB	Canada	August 3, 2015	
OMNI BC	Canada	August 3, 2015	
ON TV	Taiwan	August 17, 2015	
CTS	Taiwan	August 24, 2015	
Mediacorp Channel 8	Singapore	September 10, 2015	
True4U	Thailand	February 22, 2016	
Asian TV	South Korea	April 4, 2016	
중화TV	South Korea	2016	
Giải Trí TV	Vietnam	March 21, 2017	
D-Drama	Vietnam	May 10, 2018	
Sony ONE	Singapore; Malaysia; Indonesia; Philippines; Thailand	June 23, 2018	
