= Huang Xiaoming =

Chinese actor, singer, and model (born 1977)

- 黄晓明
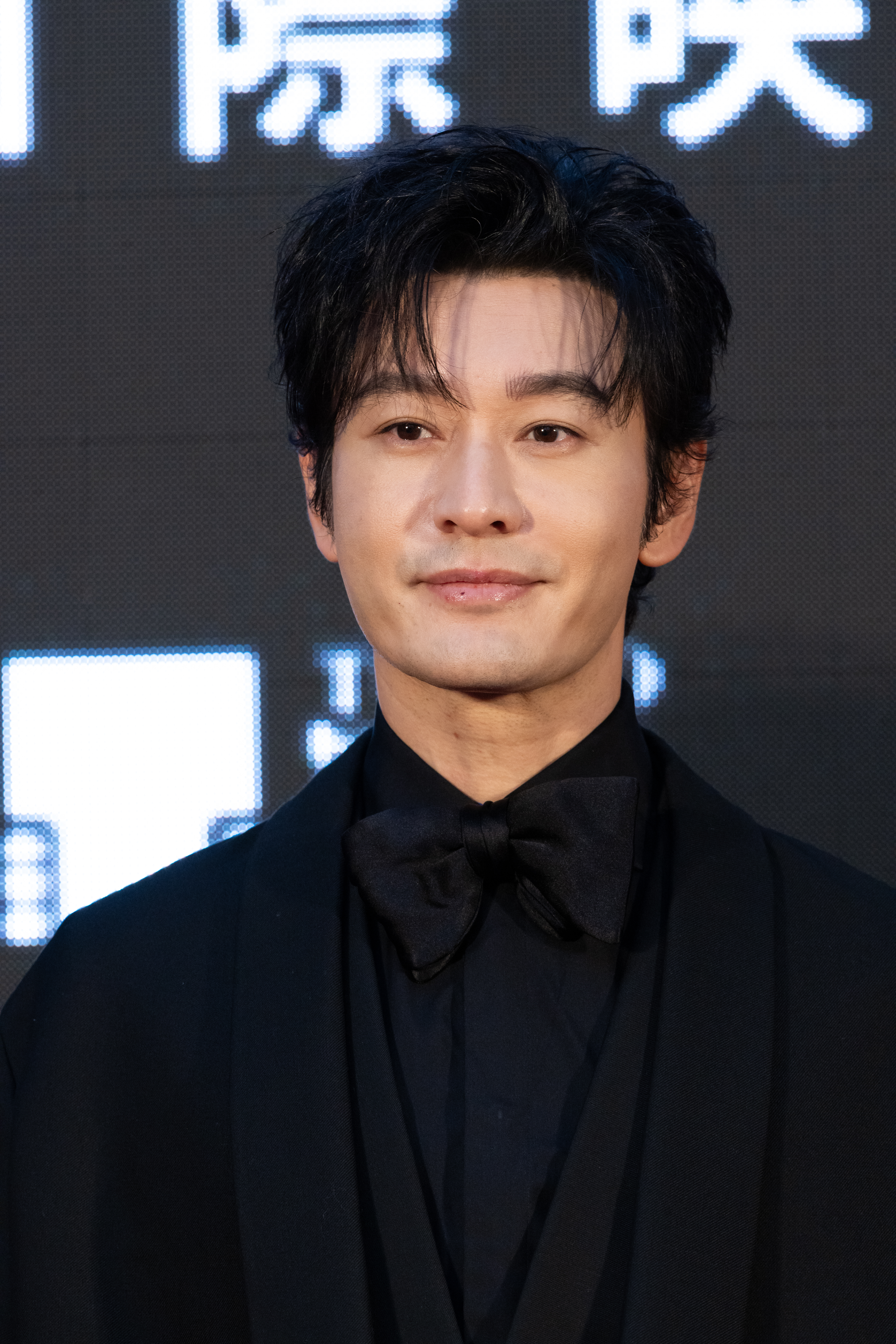
- Huang at the 37th Tokyo International Film Festival in 2024
- Born: 13 November 1977 (age 48); Qingdao, Shandong, China
- Education: Beijing Film Academy
- Occupations: Actor; singer; model
- Years active: 1998–present
- Agent: Huang Xiaoming Studio
- Spouse: Angelababy (m. 2015; div. 2022)
- Children: 2
- Musical career
- Genres: Mandopop

Chinese name
- Traditional Chinese: 黃曉明
- Simplified Chinese: 黄晓明
Transcriptions
Standard Mandarin
- Hanyu Pinyin: Huáng Xiǎomíng
- Website: huangxiaoming.com.cn

Huang Xiaoming or Mark Huang (Chinese: 黄晓明; pinyin: Huáng Xiǎomíng, born 13 November 1977) is a Chinese actor and singer. Huang rose to prominence for playing Emperor Wu of Han in the television series The Prince of Han Dynasty (2001), followed by popular series such as The Return of the Condor Heroes (2006), Shanghai Bund (2007), The Patriot Yue Fei (2013), Cruel Romance (2015), Nirvana in Fire 2 (2017), Winter Begonia (2020), as well as films The Message (2009), The Last Tycoon (2012), and American Dreams in China (2013).

== Early life ==
Huang was born in Qingdao, Shandong and is an only child. His father was an engineer while his mother was an accountant. At age nine, he was selected by a film studio to play the child protagonist in a movie. Huang is the second older cousin of Olympian Chen Meng, who won two table tennis gold medals at Tokyo 2020.

Throughout his school life, Huang planned to become a scientist, but when the Beijing Film Academy came to Qingdao to recruit students, his Chinese teacher encouraged him to take advantage of the opportunity. A month before his interview, his foot was run over and crushed by a jeep, so he had to walk into the interview on crutches with a plaster cast on his leg. The interviewer, Cui Xinqin, would be Huang's class monitor at the Beijing Film Academy, where he was classmates with Zhao Wei and Chen Kun. Huang graduated from the academy in 2000.

== Career ==
In 1984, Huang was initially chosen by a producer to star in a drama as a child actor, but was dropped later because of his shy and introverted personality. In 1998, while at the Beijing Film Academy, he debuted in the drama Love is Not a Game.

Huang gained attention when he was chosen to replace Lu Yi for the leading role in The Prince of Han Dynasty, which earned high ratings. He later starred in all three installments of the series from 2001 to 2005, and went from an unknown newbie to an A-lister.

He followed with a list of popular TV dramas, such as Merry Wanderer Tang Bohu (2003), for which he won the Outstanding Actor award at the 14th Zhejiang TV Peony Award for his performance; My Fair Princess III (2003). He played the leading roles in Shanghai Bund (2007), a remake of the 1980 Hong Kong television series The Bund, and Royal Tramp, adapted from Louis Cha's wuxia novel The Deer and the Cauldron.

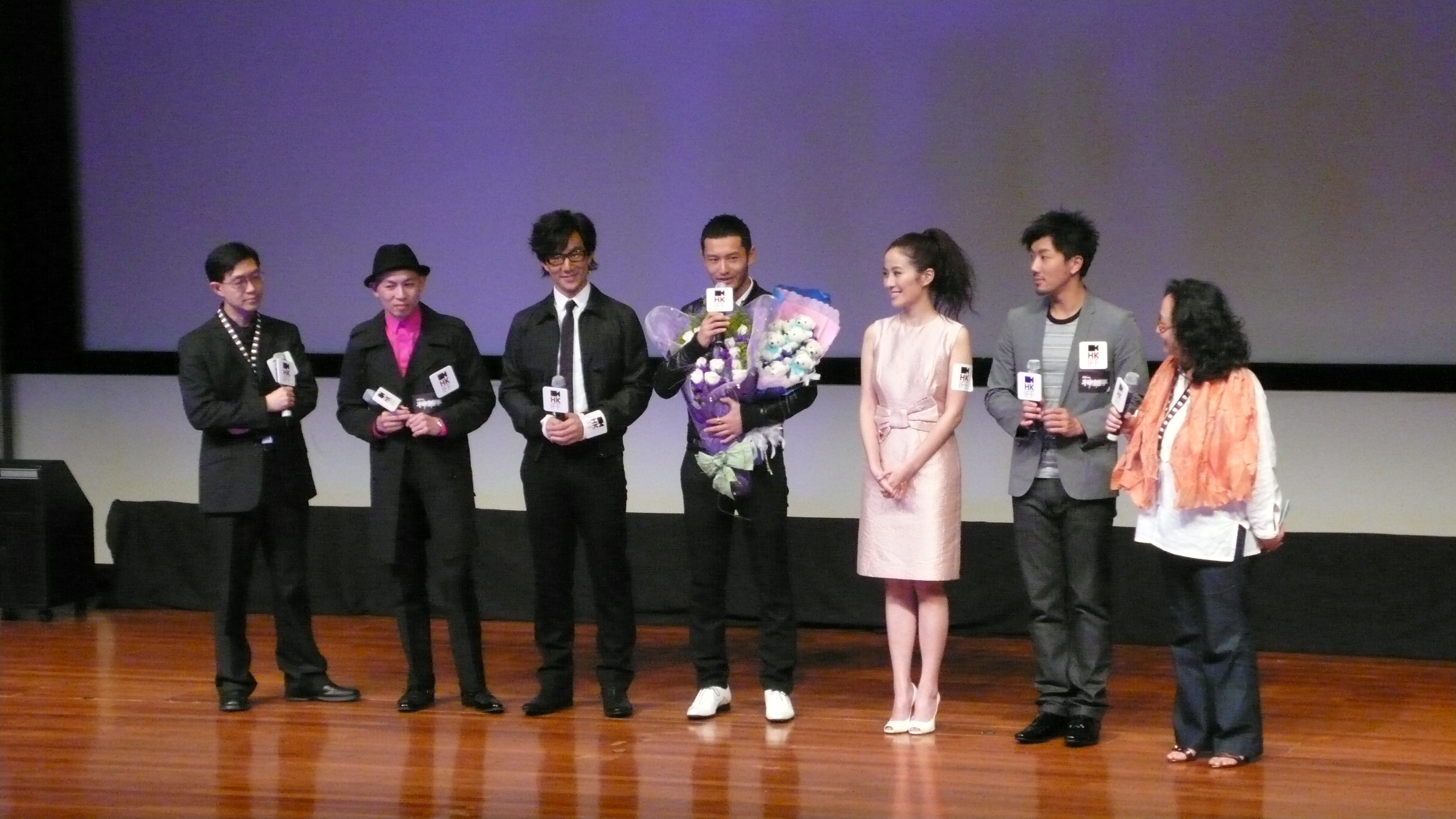
Huang Xiaoming (middle) during the global premiere of The Sniper, 2009

After achieving success in television, Huang decided to extend his career into cinema. His first major role was in the historical film The Banquet as the antagonist. He then starred in the Hong Kong action film The Sniper (2009), martial arts film Ip Man 2 (2010) and the historical epic Sacrifice (2010) directed by Chen Kaige. He made a comeback to television with Taiwanese idol drama Summer's Desire (2011), based on the novel of the same name by Ming Xiaoxi.

Huang's performance as a bandit leader in An Inaccurate Memoir (2012) won him the Best Actor award at the 4th China Image Film Festival. Huang also starred in martial arts epic The Guillotines and played the younger version of Chow Yun-fat's character in The Last Tycoon. The same year, Huang was selected as the ambassador of the Changchun Film Festival and became the first mainland actor to have his wax figure displayed in Hong Kong's Madam Tussauds museum.

Huang starred in the film American Dreams in China (2013) by Peter Chan. The success of the film brought a new impetus into Huang's career, and won him the Best Actor award at the 29th Golden Rooster Awards, 15th Huabiao Awards, 12th Changchun Film Festival and 32nd Hundred Flowers Awards. The same year Huang starred in another television project, playing the titular hero in the historical drama The Patriot Yue Fei.

Huang next starred in John Woo's The Crossing (2014). Set in 1930s Shanghai, the romantic epic is based on the true story of the Taiping steamer collision and follows six characters and their intertwining love stories; Huang plays a successful general who romances a wealthy debutante (played by Korean actress Song Hye-kyo). Another romance film followed; where Huang starred next to Fan Bingbing in The White Haired Witch of Lunar Kingdom, adapted from Baifa Monü Zhuan.

Huang starring alongside Joe Chen in the period romance drama, Cruel Romance (2015). The same year, he starred alongside long-time friend Zhao Wei in the action comedy film Hollywood Adventures. In 2017, Huang starred in the historical wuxia drama Nirvana in Fire 2. In 2018, Huang starred in the drama film Forever Young, which tells stories of four generations of students from Tsinghua University. In 2019, Huang starred in the disaster film The Bravest as a fire fighter. In 2020, Huang starred in the period romance drama Winter Begonia produced by Yu Zheng.

== Other activities ==
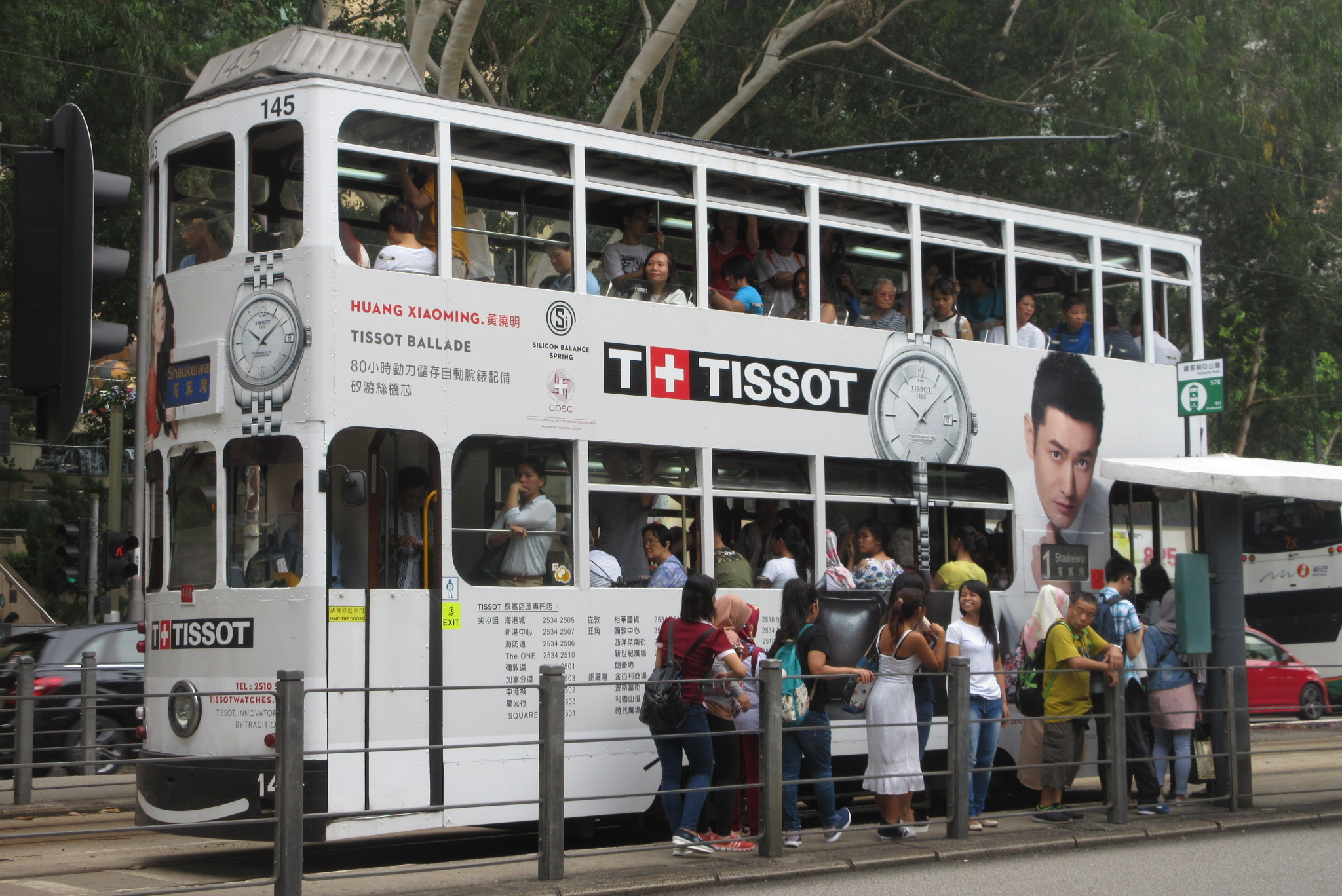
White tram with advertisement of Tissot with ambassador Huang, at Causeway Bay Road, Hong Kong

=== Investment ===
Huang is a shareholder of Huayi Brothers Media Corporation, with about 1.8 million shares.

=== Philanthropy ===
In 2009, Huang donated one million yuan to adopt two panda cubs and was named an ambassador to China's Panda Protection Research Center.

In 2010, Huang donated 200,000 yuan for earthquake relief to support for victims of the Yushu temblor in Northwest China's Qinghai province.

In 2016, Huang was named a UNAIDS National Goodwill Ambassador for China. The same year, he was appointed as an advocate for anti-trafficking by the Ministry of Public Security.

== Personal life ==
=== Li Yu ===
Huang's first girlfriend was actress Li Yu. They dated when they were both students at the Beijing Film Academy, but the relationship ended when Li decided to break up.

=== Liu Liqi ===
From 2000 to 2004, Huang dated his Beijing Film Academy classmate Liu Liqi (formerly known as Liu Yi). They lived together during their relationship. After they broke up, Huang gifted Liu an apartment, for which he had partially paid, and a Mini Cooper.

=== Qin Lan ===
In September 2003, Huang began dating actress Qin Lan, whom he had co-starred in My Fair Princess III and fell in love while filming TV series Dragon Stamp. On 27 October 2003, their relationship became public when Qin visited Huang in the hospital when he was injured in a car accident in Yinchuan. On 28 November 2006, Huang announced their breakup.

=== Li Fei'er ===
In 2007, Huang dated actress Li Fei'er, whom he met while filming the TV series The Deer and the Cauldron. That same year, Li appeared in his music video for Anything is Possible. They broke up in 2010, and Li publicly claimed that Angelababy was the third party that caused their breakup.

=== Angelababy ===
In 2009, Huang began a relationship with Angelababy, which he went public on 28 February 2014. They registered their marriage in Qingdao on 27 May 2015 and held their wedding at the Shanghai Exhibition Centre in October of the same year. Their son was born on 17 January 2017 in Hong Kong. In January 2021, following the reunion between Huang and Li Fei'er in the reality show Sisters Who Make Waves Season 2, Angelababy stated on Weibo that when she began her relationship with Huang, he had told her he was single, and she never intervened in his previous relationship with Li. Shortly after, Huang also denied the long-standing rumor that Angelababy was the other woman. On 28 January 2022, Huang and Angelababy announced their divorce.

=== Ye Ke ===
In 2020, the internet influencer Ye Ke moved into the Four Seasons Place Shanghai (now Regent Residences Shanghai), where Huang and Angelababy also lived. In 2022, Ye divorced businessman Wang Mingjin (Marx Wong), and Huang divorced Angelababy. Rumors of a relationship between Huang and Ye began circulating due to their overlapping activity on social media since February of that year, shortly after Huang's divorce, although Ye dismissed the rumors. In July 2022, Ye posted a birthday card signed by "Mr. M," purportedly sent by Huang. They briefly split in mid 2023 when Huang had a fling with actress Zhao Shijin (Jenny Chao), but got back together to spend Christmas with friends. In September 2024, Ye's side claimed that the two were married, and Ye posted a photo of a Graff diamond ring. Huang denied the marriage in a response to Next Apple, a Taiwanese online media outlet. Ye responded to Huang's denial with a Weibo post using the trending hashtag, "#HuangXiaomingNotMarried—a bit ridiculous," and included a chat history where Huang and his team claimed that the Taiwanese media had "fabricated" the denial. Huang then confirmed on Weibo that he and Ye were "together." Ye deleted her chat history on Weibo the same day. Following her sudden rise to fame, she became the subject of widespread online mockery and memes, especially referencing her previous livestream, which led to her announcement of withdrawal from the internet on November 10, 2024. She returned to social media on July 25, 2025, by launching a livestream, and on August 7, she confirmed both the birth of her child and her breakup with Huang.

== Filmography ==
=== Film ===
Year	English title	Chinese title	Role	Notes	Ref.
1999	Marry Me	我們結婚吧	Li Jun		
2000	Bright Heart	明亮的心	Ma Lu		
2005	Legend of the Dragon	龍威父子	Qi Feng		
2006	The Banquet	夜宴	Yin Sun		
2008	Fit Lover	愛情呼叫轉移2：愛情左右	Traffic policeman	Cameo	
2009	The Sniper	神槍手	Ling Jing		
2009	The Founding of a Republic	建国大业	Li Yinqiao	Cameo	
2009	The Message	風声	Takeda		
2010	Ip Man 2	葉問2	Wong Leung		
2010	Flirting Scholar 2	唐伯虎點秋香2	Tang Bohu		
2010	Adventure of the King	龙凤店	Tang Bohu	Cameo	
2010	Sacrifice	趙氏孤兒	Han Jue		
2012	Love in the Buff	春嬌與志明	Ben	Cameo	
2012	An Inaccurate Memoir	匹夫	Fang Youwang		
2012	The Guillotines	血滴子	Tianlang		
2012	The Last Tycoon	大上海	Cheng Daqi (young)		
2013	American Dreams in China	中國合伙人	Cheng Dongqing		
2013	Badges of Fury	不二神探	Interpol officer	Cameo	
2013	Crimes of Passion	一場風花雪月的事	Xue Yu		
2013	Saving Mother Robot	瑪德2號	Xiao Tie		
2013	Amazing	神奇	Bing Shan		
2014	Breaking the Waves	激浪青春	He Tianhua		
2014	The White Haired Witch of Lunar Kingdom	白髮魔女傳之明月天國	Zhuo Yihang		
2014	Women Who Flirt	撒娇女人最好命	Marco		
2014	The Crossing	太平輪	Lei Yifang		
2015	Insanity	暴疯语	Chow Ming-kit		
2015	You Are My Sunshine	何以笙簫默	He Yichen	Also producer	
2015	Hollywood Adventures	横冲直撞好莱坞	He Yuming		
2015	The Crossing 2	太平輪·彼岸	Lei Yifang		
2015	Bride Wars	新娘大作戲	Groom	Cameo	
2016	Xuanzang	大唐玄奘	Xuanzang		
2016	League of Gods	封神傳奇	Yang Jian		
2016	Mission Milano	王牌逗王牌	Luo Tianhao		
2017	The Thousand Faces of Dunjia	奇門遁甲	Huang Shang	Cameo	
2018	Forever Young	无问西东	Chen Peng		
2018	Escape Plan 2: Hades	金蝉脱壳2	Shu		
2019	The Bravest	烈火英雄	Jiang Liwei		
2020	The Eight Hundred	八佰	Messenger	Cameo	
2022	Only Fools Rush In	四海	Showta	Cameo	
2022	Ode to the Spring	你是我的春天	Li Jing		
2022	Ordinary Hero	平凡英雄	Xie Huiyang		
2023	Heart's Motive	最后的真相	Ding Yifeng	Also producer	
2023	The Volunteers: To the War	志愿军: 雄兵出击	Jiang Chao		
2024	Mostly Sunny	阳光俱乐部	Wu You		
2024	The Wig	戴假发的人	Meng Zhong		
2025	Her Turn	即兴谋杀	Doctor Luo		
TBA	A'mai Joins the Army	阿麦从军	TBA		

=== Television series ===
Year	English title	Chinese title	Role	Ref.
1998	Love is Not a Game	爱情不是游戏	Xiao Zhuoyi	
2000	A Netizen's Diary	网虫日记	Yu Baimei	
2000	Storm of the Dragon	龙珠风暴	Di Guangyuan	
2001	The Prince of Han Dynasty	大汉天子	Liu Che	
2001	Changying in Hands	长缨在手	Zhang Li	
2002	Invincible Magistrate	无敌县令	Tian Long	
2003	Little Sister Hua Ni	花妮妹妹	Zhi Yang	
2003	Merry Wanderer Tang Bohu	风流少年唐伯虎	Tang Bohu	
2004	The Prince of Han Dynasty 2	大汉天子2	Liu Che	
2004	Long Piao	龙票	Qi Zijun	
2005	Talented Men	女才男貌	Wang Jun	
2005	Strange Tales of Liao Zhai	新聊斋志异	Bai Yang	
2006	The Prince of Han Dynasty 3	大汉天子3	Liu Che	
2006	The Return of the Condor Heroes	神雕侠侣	Yang Guo	
2007	Shanghai Bund	新上海滩	Xu Wenqiang	
2008	Royal Tramp	鹿鼎记	Wei Xiaobao	
2009	Dark Fragrance	暗香	Cheng Yuan / Cheng Da	
2010	Summer's Desire	泡沫之夏	Luo Xi	
2013	The Patriot Yue Fei	精忠岳飞	Yue Fei	
2015	Cruel Romance	锦绣缘·华丽冒险	Zuo Zhen	
2017	A Life Time Love	上古情歌	Chi Yun	
2017	Nirvana in Fire 2	琅琊榜之风起长林	Xiao Pingzhang	
2018	The Years You Were Late	你迟到的许多年	Wen Qiang	
2020	Winter Begonia	鬓边不是海棠红	Cheng Fengtai	
2021	The Glory and the Dream	光荣与梦想	Zhou Enlai	
2021	Game Changer	危机先生	Lin Zhongshuo	
2021	Medal of the Republic	功勋	Huang Xuhua	
2023	Legend of Han Shuangxiong	大汉双雄		
2026	The Dream Maker	小城大事	Zheng Decheng	

=== Variety show ===
Year	English title	Chinese title	Role	Ref.
2017	Chinese Restaurant	中餐厅	Cast member	
2019	Chinese Restaurant 3	中餐厅3	Cast member	
2020	Sisters Who Make Waves	乘风破浪的姐姐	Producer/presenter	
2025	Wander Together	宇宙闪烁请注意	Cast member	

== Discography ==
=== Albums ===
Year	Album details	Track listing
2007	It's Ming: Released: 12 December 2007; Label: Music Nation Group; Formats: CD, DVD	1. An Lian (暗恋) – Unrequited Love; 2. My Girl; 3. Shen Me Dou Ke Yi (什么都可以) – Anything is Possible; 4. Feng De Hai Zi (风的孩子) – Child of the Wind; 5. Mei You Ni Wo Ai Shei (没有你我爱谁) – Without You, Whom Should I Love; 6. Tian Xie Qing Ren (天蝎情人) – Scorpion Lover; 7. Niang Jiu (酿酒) – Brewing Wind; 8. Yin Wei You Ni (因为有你) – Because of You; 9. An Jing De Xiang Ni (安静的想你) – Quietly Thinking of You; 10. I'm Coming; 11. Jiu Suan Mei You Ming Tian (就算没有明天) – Even If There's No Tomorrow
2010	Moopa: Released: 18 March 2010; Label: MusicNationGroup; Formats: CD, DVD	1. MOOPA (Move Party); 2. Feng Sheng (风声) – Sound of the Wind; 3. Tuan Tuan Yuan Yuan (团团圆圆) – Reunion; 4. Wo De Kuai Le Bu Shou Fei (我的快乐不收费) – My Happiness is Free of Charge; 5. Ni Shuo De Dui (你说的对) – You are Right; 6. Hao Ren Ka (好人卡) – Nice Guy Card; 7. Ni Zai Wo Xin Shang (你在我心上) – You're on My Heart; 8. Shou Bu Liao (受不了) – Unbearable; 9. Hei Mao Yu Niu Niao (黑猫与牛奶) – Black Cat and Milk; 10. MOOPA (remix)

=== Singles ===
Year	English title	Chinese title	Album	Notes/Ref.
2002	"Only Have You"	只要有你	My Fair Princess III OST	
2006	"Fly Together"	双飞	The Return of the Condor Heroes OST	with Della Ding
2006	"Pugilistic Smile"	江湖笑	The Return of the Condor Heroes OST	with Zhang Zizhong, Hu Jun, Zhou Jianhua & Xiao Chong
2006	"Even If There's No Tomorrow"	就算没有明天	Shanghai Bund OST	with Sun Li
2008	"One World One Dream"	—N/a	—N/a	Promotional song for the Beijing 2008 Olympics
2008	"Nice Guy Card"	好人卡	—N/a	with Zhao Wei
2008	"My Southern"	我的南方	—N/a	Charity song
2009	"You're an Angel"	你是天使	Dark Fragrance OST	
2009	"Sound of the Wind"	風聲	The Message OST	
2010	"Better City Better Life"	—N/a	—N/a	with Elva Hsiao; Promotional song for the Shanghai World Expo
2010	"Black Cat and Milk"	黑猫与牛奶	Summer's Desire OST	
2011	"A Leaping Heart"	飞跃的心	—N/a	Theme song for The Legend of Yue Fei (animation film)
2012	"Inaccurate Memoir"	匹夫	An Inaccurate Memoir OST'	
2012	"Those Were the Days"	友情岁月	The Guillotines OST	with Shawn Yue & Ethan Ruan
2013	"The Story of Time"	光阴的故事	American Dreams in China OST	with Deng Chao & Tong Dawei
2013	"The Patriot Yue Fei	精忠传奇	The Patriot Yue Fei OST	with Tan Jing
2015	"Fate"	缘	Cruel Romance OST	
2015	"Silent Separation"	何以笙箫默	You Are My Sunshine OST	
2017	"Chinese Restaurant"	中餐厅		Theme song of Chinese Restaurant with Zhao Wei
2018	"Too Valiant"	太彪了	Escape Plan 2: Hades OST	
2018	"New Big Head Son & Small Head Daddy"	新大头儿子和小头爸爸	New Big Head Son & Small Head Daddy 3 OST	
2020	"Firmly Believe Love Will Win"	坚信爱会赢		Wuhan virus support theme song

== Awards and nominations ==
=== Film and television ===
Year	Award	Category	Nominated work	Result	Ref.
2003	14th Zhejiang TV Peony Awards	Outstanding Actor	Merry Wanderer Tang Bohu	Won	
2007	13th Shanghai Television Festival	Best Actor	Shanghai Bund	Nominated	
2009	12th Golden Phoenix Awards	Male Actor in a Motion Picture	The Sniper	Won	
2010	4th Asian Film Awards	Best Supporting Actor	The Message	Nominated	
2010	10th Chinese Film Media Awards	Most Popular Actor	The Message	Won	
2010	30th Hundred Flowers Award	Best Actor	The Message	Nominated	
2010	28th Golden Rooster Awards	Best Supporting Actor	The Message	Nominated	
2011	5th Asian Film Awards	Best Supporting Actor	Sacrifice	Nominated	
2011	23rd Hong Kong Society of Cinematographers Awards	Most Charismatic Actor	Sacrifice	Won	
2011	11th Chinese Film Media Awards	Most Anticipated Actor	Sacrifice	Won	
2012	9th Guangzhou Student Film Festival	Most Popular Actor	An Inaccurate Memoir	Won	
2012	4th China Image Film Festival	Best Actor	An Inaccurate Memoir	Won	
2013	29th Golden Rooster Awards	Best Actor	American Dreams in China	Won	
2013	10th Guangzhou Student Film Festival	Most Popular Actor	American Dreams in China	Won	
2013	15th Huabiao Film Awards	Outstanding Actor	American Dreams in China	Won	
2013	9th Huading Awards	Best Actor	The Last Tycoon	Nominated	
2013	5th Macau International Movie Festival	Best Actor	Amazing	Nominated	
2014	12th Changchun Film Festival	Best Actor	American Dreams in China	Won	
2014	32nd Hundred Flowers Awards	Best Actor	American Dreams in China	Won	
2014	10th Chinese American Film Festival	Best Actor	American Dreams in China	Won	
2014	13th Huading Awards	Best Actor	The Patriot Yue Fei	Nominated	
2014	27th China TV Golden Eagle Award	Best Actor	The Patriot Yue Fei	Nominated	
2014	5th Annual US-China Film Summit	2014 Film Ensemble of the Year award	Hollywood Adventures	Won	
2015	15th Golden Phoenix Awards	Male Actor in a Motion Picture	American Dreams in China	Won	
2015	2nd China-Australia Film Festival	Best Actor	You Are My Sunshine	Won	
2016	1st Chinese Film Festival in Italy	Best Actor	Xuanzang	Won	
2016	13th Changchun Film Festival	Best Actor	Xuanzang	Won	
2016	8th Macau International Movie Festival	Best Actor	Xuanzang	Nominated	
2016	1st Golden Screen Awards	Best Actor	Xuanzang	Won	
2020	35th Hundred Flowers Awards	Best Actor	The Bravest	Won	
2020	7th The Actors of China Award Ceremony	Best Actor (Web series)	Winter Begonia	Nominated	
2020	33rd Golden Rooster Awards	Best Actor	The Bravest	Won	

=== Music ===
Year	Award	Category	Nominated work	Result	Ref.
2007	Metro Radio Mandarin Hits Music Awards	Mandarin Hit Song Award	"Unrequited Love"	Won	
2007	Music Radio China Top Chart Awards	Best Newcomer	It's Ming	Won	
2007	7th Global Chinese Music Awards	Most Popular Newcomer	—N/a	Won	
2007	7th Global Chinese Music Awards	All-Rounded Artist Award	—N/a	Won	
2007	1st Migu Music Awards	Music Promotional Outstanding Contribution Award	—N/a	Won	
2008	2nd Migu Music Awards	Most Popular Trans-boundary Singer	—N/a	Won	
2008	8th 9+2 Music Pioneer Awards	Top Ten Songs	"Anything is Possible"	Won	
2008	8th 9+2 Music Pioneer Awards	Best Male Singer	—N/a	Won	
2008	8th 9+2 Music Pioneer Awards	Newcomer Award (Mainland)	—N/a	Won	
2009	9th Global Chinese Music Awards	Most Popular Male Singer (Top 5)	—N/a	Won	
2009	9th Global Chinese Music Awards	Best All-Rounded Artist	—N/a	Won	
2009	9th Global Chinese Music Awards	Best Duet Song	"Nice Guy Card"	Won	

=== Others ===
Year	Award	Category	Nominated work	Result	Ref.
2005	China Fashion Awards	Fashion Award	—N/a	Won	
2006	MTV Super Awards	Most Fashionable Artist	—N/a	Won	
2006	China Fashion Awards	Most Fashionable Actor	—N/a	Won	
2007	Bazaar Charity Night	Top Ten Charity Celebrities	—N/a	Won	
2007	Men's Uno Award Ceremony	Most In Male Celebrity	—N/a	Won	
2007	Sina Television Ranking First Season	Best Actor	Shanghai Bund	Won	
2007	BQ Awards	Hot Star of the Year	—N/a	Won	
2008	Sohu Television Awards	Prince of the Year	—N/a	Won	
2008	China Television Glorious 30th Anniversary Ceremony	Most Influential Television Actor	—N/a	Won	
2008	Sina Charity Night	Most Anticipated Star	—N/a	Won	
2008	Sina Charity Night	Most Loved Star	—N/a	Won	
2008	Bazaar Charity Night	Top Ten Charity Celebrities	—N/a	Won	
2009	Esquire Man At His Best Awards	Most Popular Actor	—N/a	Won	
2009	Bazaar Charity Night	Top Ten Charity Celebrities	—N/a	Won	
2010	Top Ten Entertainment Figures		—N/a	Won	
2012	Esquire Man At His Best Awards	Top Ten Fashionable Actors	—N/a	Won	
2012	5th ROI Festival	Most Commercially Valuable Artist	—N/a	Won	
2013	GQ Men of the Year	Person of the Year	—N/a	Won	
2013	Bazaar Men People of the Year	Top Ten Most Attractive Male Celebrities	—N/a	Won	
2014	iQiyi All-Star Carnival	Person of the Year	—N/a	Won	
2015	"Wind From The East" Entertainment Influence Awards	Influential Figure of the Year	—N/a	Won	
2015	4th All-Rounded Youth Commendation Ceremony	Exemplary Celebrity	—N/a	Won	
2018	iQiyi All-Star Carnival	Television Artist of the Year	—N/a	Won	
2019	Tencent Video All Star Awards	Program Star of the Year	—N/a	Won	

=== Forbes China Celebrity 100 ===
Year	Rank	Ref.
2013	8th	
2014	4th	
2015	5th	
2017	16th	
2020	76th	
