= Magic Card =

- Poster
- 魔卡行动
- Directed by: Kwok-Man Keung
- Starring: Qiao Renliang; Zhang Xinyu; Simon Yam; Kainan Bai
- Production companies: Shanghai Yingku Digital Film Cinema; Shanghai Huayu Media
- Distributed by: Shanghai Huayu Media; Qili (Shanghai) Media
- Release date: 16 October 2015
- Running time: 90 minutes
- Country: China
- Languages: Mandarin; English; Italian
- Box office: CN¥1.5 million

Magic Card (Chinese: 魔卡行动) is a 2015 Chinese romance action comedy film directed by Kwok-Man Keung. The film was released on 16 October 2015.

== Cast ==
- Qiao Renliang
- Zhang Xinyu
- Simon Yam
- Kainan Bai
- Dada Chan
- Maria Grazia Cucinotta
- Yida Cai
- Ying Yin
- Adriano Giannini
- Wayne Zhang
- Zhang Yishan
- Luxia Jiang
- Zhonglin He
- Yaliang Nie
- Zhu Guanghu

== Reception ==
The film has earned CN¥1.469 million at the Chinese box office.
