= Ghost Blows Out the Light =

2006 novel by Zhang Muye

- Author: Zhang Muye (天下霸唱)
- Original title: 鬼吹灯 (Guǐ Chuīdēng)
- Language: Chinese
- Genre: Fantasy novel
- Publication date: 1st book: March 2006 (online) and October 2006 (print)
- Publication place: China
- Media type: Online, Print

Gui Chui Deng (Ghost Blows Out the Light) (Chinese: 鬼吹灯; pinyin: Guǐ Chuīdēng), also referred to as Candle in the Tomb, is a fantasy novel series written by Zhang Muye (张牧野), known by his pen-name Tianxia Bachang (天下霸唱), about a team of grave robbers seeking a hidden treasure haunted by ghosts, with the first book published online in March 2006. It quickly became the bestselling online novel in China with an estimated readership of six million, and when published in print form in October the same year, went on to sell over 500,000 copies, and has been acclaimed across China.

Set in the 1980s, the series follows former soldier Hu Bayi and his partner as they raid tombs in search of valuables. The two team up with an American archaeologist after they fall victim to a curse, and to release themselves from it they must seek clues found among ancient mythical sites across China.

The title is derived from an old Chinese saying, credited by the author to genuine grave robbers: "A human lights the candle and the ghosts blow it out." According to Zhang, grave robbers would place a candle in the south-east corner of a tomb after entering, in an attempt to make contact with the dead. If the candle was extinguished it was a sign that the spirits within opposed the intrusion, and the robbers would be obliged to depart, leaving everything intact and undisturbed.

The first volume has been translated into English by Jeremy Tiang and published by Delacorte Press as The City of Sand and The Dragon Ridge Tombs.

== Adaptations ==
In July 2007, it was reported that Hollywood film studio New Line Cinema was planning a movie adaptation. It was stated that one of the two lead actors was to be Qian Zhijun, the teenager whose face was behind the Xiao Pang internet phenomenon, while other roles would be played by established Hong Kong movie stars. There has already been a bestselling online game released based on the book, while a play is also mooted.

In 2015, two film adaptations of the novel was released. Zhang revealed that out of all eight volumes of the novel; half of them were sold to China Film Group Corporation, and the other half were sold to Wanda Pictures. Zhang worked with Wanda for Mojin: The Lost Legend, helping to write a new chapter especially for the film. The other adaptation, Chronicles of the Ghostly Tribe received mixed reviews as too many changes were made to the story in the original novel, and Zhang even issued a statement saying he was not involved with the screenplay. In 2018, another film was released titled Mojin: The Worm Valley. In 2025, a fourth adaptation was released, The Legend Hunters.

Three television adaptations are also produced. Candle in the Tomb, released in December 2016 by Daylight Entertainment, is based on the first volume of the novel series of the same title. Two more adaptations The Weasel Grave and Mu Ye Gui Shi were released in 2017 and are based on the second volume and partly eighth volume of the series respectively.

In 2019, another adaptation called The Wrath of Time was released and in 2020 The Lost Caverns was released followed by The Worm Valley in 2021 with the same casts reprising for 2022's Kunlun Tomb and 2023's South Sea Tomb.

== See also ==
- Daomu Biji
