= Forever Young (2018 film) =

2018 film directed by Li Fangfang

- Theatrical release poster
- Traditional Chinese: 無問西東
- Simplified Chinese: 无问西东
- Literal meaning: Don’t ask whether it is East or West
- Hanyu Pinyin: wú wèn xī dōng
- Directed by: Li Fangfang
- Written by: Li Fangfang
- Produced by: Hao Jiang
- Starring: Zhang Ziyi; Huang Xiaoming; Chang Chen; Wang Leehom; Chen Chusheng
- Cinematography: Cao Yu
- Edited by: Zhu Lin
- Music by: Liu Tao
- Production company: China Film Group Corporation
- Release date: 12 January 2018
- Running time: 150 minutes
- Country: China
- Language: Mandarin
- Budget: ¥100 million
- Box office: US$118.6 million

Forever Young is a 2018 Chinese epic drama film written and directed by Li Fangfang. The film stars Zhang Ziyi, Huang Xiaoming, Chang Chen, Wang Leehom and Chen Chusheng. The film is about four generations of Tsinghua University graduates, spanning a hundred years of modern Chinese history since World War I, from the 1920s, the 1940s, the 1960s till nowadays, and how no matter how time changes, there are always people who insist on their dreams.

The film entered production in early 2012, with principal photography concluding in the same year. Filming locations include Beijing, Yunnan, Gansu and Guangdong. It was released on January 12, 2018.

With over US$118 million box office, Forever Young received the largest box office ticket sales of January 2018 in China.

The movie was critically acclaimed and both Zhang Ziyi and Wang Leehom won Best Actress and Best Actor respectively at the 2018 Macau International Movie Festival.

== Cast ==
- Zhang Ziyi as Wang Minjia
- Huang Xiaoming as Chen Peng
- Chang Chen as Zhang Guoguo
- Wang Leehom as Shen Guangyao
- Chen Chusheng as Wu Jinglan
- Zu Feng as Mei Yiqi
- Russell Wong as General
- Paul Philip Clark as US Airman
- Han Tongsheng as Robert
- Yao Chen
- Michelle Yim as Shen Guangyao's mother
- Jonathan Wu
- Tie Zheng as Li Xiang
- Wu Jinyan as Lin Huiyin
- Huang Wei as Zhou Shulun

== Theme songs ==
- "Wu Wen" (无问) by Mao Buyi
- "Wu Wen Xi Dong" (无问西东) by Faye Wong

== Production ==
Production started in 2011 and ended in 2012. The film was originally shot to commemorate the 100th anniversary of Tsinghua University in 2011, with a budget of over 100 million yuan. The film was slated for release at the end of 2014 but was postponed to 2018.
