= Shanghai Dianji University =

Public university in Shanghai, China

- 上海电机学院
- Type: Public
- Established: 1953; 73 years ago
- Academic staff: More than 1,100
- Undergraduates: More than 12,000
- Postgraduates: More than 2,100
- Location: Shanghai, China
- Campus: Lingang and Minhang
- Website: www.sdju.edu.cn

Shanghai Dianji University (SDJU; 上海电机学院) is a public university in Shanghai, China. Founded in 1953, it is a municipal institution of higher education administered by the Shanghai Municipal Education Commission. The university is engineering-oriented while also offering programmes in economics, management, literature, art and science.

The university operates two campuses in Lingang and Minhang. As of September 2025, it has more than 15,000 full-time students and more than 1,100 faculty members. It offers 47 undergraduate programmes and 12 master's degree programmes.

== History ==
Shanghai Dianji University traces its origins to 1953. It developed from a technical institution serving China's electrical manufacturing industry and became a full-time undergraduate university in 2004. The university began graduate education in 2011 and is authorized to award master's degrees.

== Academics ==
Shanghai Dianji University is an engineering-oriented public university with a focus on advanced manufacturing and modern service industries. It offers 47 undergraduate programmes and 12 master's degree programmes across engineering, economics, management, literature, art and science.

Engineering is the university's dominant discipline, accounting for approximately 68% of its undergraduate programmes. The university emphasizes application-oriented education and close cooperation with industry, particularly in advanced manufacturing, intelligent equipment and modern service industries.

According to the Shanghai Municipal Human Resources and Social Security Bureau, the university has two National Characteristic Specialty programmes, two National First-class Undergraduate Programme construction sites, three programmes selected for the Ministry of Education's Excellent Engineer Education and Training Program, and seventeen Shanghai First-class Undergraduate Programmes.

Among its nationally recognised programmes, Mechanical Design, Manufacturing and Automation was designated as a National Characteristic Specialty under the Ministry of Education's fourth batch of National Characteristic Specialty Construction Sites. International Economics and Trade was designated as a National Characteristic Specialty under the sixth batch of the same programme. In addition, Mechanical Design, Manufacturing and Automation and Electrical Engineering and Automation have been selected as National First-class Undergraduate Programme construction sites.

== Campus ==
The university has two campuses located in Lingang and Minhang, Shanghai. Its principal campus is in the Lingang Special Area of Pudong New Area.

== International cooperation ==
Shanghai Dianji University maintains cooperative relationships with universities and institutions in more than 30 countries and regions and operates student exchange and academic cooperation programmes with overseas partners.
