= Destined to Love You =

- Genre: Romantic comedy Period; Action
- Created by: Tong Hua
- Written by: Qian Jingjing; Mei Yingpu; Gan Ling
- Directed by: Wu Jinyuan; Chen Kuo-hua; Billy Tang
- Starring: Joe Chen; Jia Nailiang; Bosco Wong
- Country of origin: China
- Original language: Mandarin
- No. of seasons: 1
- No. of episodes: 44

Production
- Production location: Hengdian World Studios (Zhejiang)
- Production companies: Xing Sheng Di Movie & Television Culture Co., Ltd.

Original release
- Network: Hunan TV
- Release: 16 June – 11 July 2015

Destined to Love You (Chinese: 偏偏喜欢你) is a 2015 Chinese television series created by Tong Hua. It stars Joe Chen, Jia Nailiang and Bosco Wong. The series aired on Hunan TV from 16 June to 11 July 2015.

== Synopsis ==
The story is set in the 1916s and revolves around Qian Baobao, a normal civilian. In order to earn money to help her sick mother, she became an instructor at Longcheng Military Academy under a stolen identity. The stolen identity is Xiao Han, who has already died from an accident while studying for her doctorate overseas. Originally, Qian Baobao only wanted to stay at the military academy until her mother no longer needs treatment but somehow, she became entangled in an inextricable love triangle. The two men making up this love triangle are Xiang Hao and Shen Wentao. Shen Wentao is passionately pursuing Bao Bao and Xiang Hao is Xiao Han’s fiance. In order to conceal her real identity, Bao Bao has to evade the growing feelings between her and Xiang Hao as well as dispel Shen Wentao’s suspicions and temptations. In the middle of all this, a major crisis emerges when it turns out Xiao Han didn’t really die. Xiao Han’s return causes Qian Baobao to examine her conscience.

== Cast ==
=== Main ===
Actor	Character	Introduction
Joe Chen	Qian Baobao	An actress from a circle troupe who becomes an instructor for psychological studies at a military school due to a stolen identity. She is courageous, determined and has a bright personality.
Jia Nailiang	Xiang Hao	Son of the Ding Warlord Faction, and fiance of Xiao Han. A passionate and loyal man who is filled with justice. After his fall-out with Shen Wentao, he heads to the military school where he trained and became the leader of the elite troops. There, he meets Qian Baobao whom he often bickers with, and later comes to love.
Bosco Wong	Shen Wentao	Son of the Shen Warlord Faction. He is calm, intelligent and decisive. He gets misunderstood for being cold and heartless by Xiang Hao, but chooses to bear the misunderstandings. He falls for Qian Baobao's kindness and bright nature, choosing to protect and watch over her silently.

=== Supporting ===
==== Students ====
Actor	Character	Introduction
Zhang Yunlong	Gu Xiaobai	Childhood friend of Xiang Hao and Shen Wentao. He is exceptionally loyal toward Xiang Hao and chooses to stand by his side. He is playful, gossipy and flirtatious, and often gets into trouble.
Vengo Gao	Du Feng	A gangster who becomes a student at the military school. He is the oldest among the students. Due to his background, he develops a paranoid personality but he is exceptionally trusting toward Xiang Hao. He appears lazy and nonchalant, but is able to capture the thoughts of Xiang Hao accurately and talk sense into him. He falls in love with Shen Wenyu.
Zheng Long	Han Xun	Son of the Quartermaster Department Director. A sensitive and meticulous man who is Shen Wentao's trustworthy companion.
Lin Zifeng	Gao Meiren	Son of the Minister of Defence. A cold and brash man who often chooses to resort to violence to settle problems. He is Shen Wentao's close companion.
Xu Qifeng	Li Tianhan	Li Jizhou's son. He is cruel and ambitious, and uses all sort of underhanded methods to frame his rivals - Xiang Hao and Shen Wentao. His actual identity is a Japanese spy who has assumed the identity of Li Tianhan, and plans to make use of the position of the leader of the elite troops to assist the Japanese in invading China.
Li Ji	Zhou Jie	Li Tianhan's lackey.
Gao Zeming	Zhao Hu	Li Tianhan's lackey.

==== Instructors and school staff ====
Actor	Character	Introduction
Shaun Tam	Ouyang Fei	Physical training instructor. He is known for his cold and strict appearance, but cares the students deep down. His unwavering love toward Xiao Han, whom he saved twice, touches her and they eventually became lovers. He is also good friends with Liu Tianyu.
Liu Tianru	Shen Wenyu	Shen Wentao's younger sister. Assistant instructor for basics training. She is spoilt and proud and does whatever she wants. She enters military school to pursue Xiang Hao, but falls in love with Du Feng instead.
Wang Xiuzhu	Xue Shaoqi	Xue Shaohua's younger sister. A military nurse. To avenge her brother, she goes against Li Tianhan.
Zhao Jiuyi	Su Rui	A military doctor. He is gentle and kind but actually has a strong-willed personality.
Wang Xiang	Xie Tianjiao	Director of military affairs. She is a capable and outstanding woman who is feared by the students for her strictness. She falls in love with the gentle Su Rui, and decides to pursue him.
Zhang Ningjiang	Liu Tianyu	Firearms instructor. A warm-hearted and humorous guy who is good friends with Ouyang Fei.

==== Others ====
Actor	Character	Introduction
Chen Liangping	Xiang Shaoda	Chief of Army Staff. Xiang Hao's father.
Yu Dongjiang	Shen Guoshun	Military commander. Shen Wentao's father.
Lu Ling		Qian Baobao's mother.
Ruan Weijing	Lieutenant He	Serves Xiang Shaoda. He treats Xiang Hao as his own brother.
Hu Yongchun	Ma Yiyan	Chief of the rouge bandits. He is loyal and trustworthy.

=== Special appearance ===
Actor	Character	Introduction
Zheng Shuang	Xiao Han	Daughter of a wealthy businessman, who is also a psychologist. She is gentle and understanding. On her train journey to Long Cheng, she gets caught in an assassination attempt and drops down a cliff. While everyone thought she was dead, she was actually saved by Ouyang Fei. She was adamant to be together with her fiance, whom she loved since young, but eventually falls for Ouyang Fei.
Hui Shiu-hung	Li Jizhou	Head of the Li Warlord Faction, and principal of Longcheng Military Academy. Crafty and vicious, he would resort to all sorts of trickery to ensure that his son becomes the leader of the elite troops.
Liu Enyou	Xue Shaohua	Xue Shaoqi's brother; childhood friend of Xiang Hao, Shen Wentao and Gu Xiaobai. He was set up by Li Tianhan, and died as a result.

== Soundtrack ==
Destined to Love You - Original Television Soundtrack (偏偏喜歡你电视剧原声音乐大碟)
No.	Title	Music	Length
1.	"Love till the End (爱到底)" (Opening theme song)	Tan Weiwei
2.	"I'm Sorry (對不起)" (Ending theme song)	Yuan Ye
3.	"True Love like Blood (真爱如血)"	He Huihui
4.	"Never Say Die (永不言败)"	He Huihui, Li Zifeng, Xu Qifeng & Zhang Ningjiang
5.	"The Train is Coming (火车火车就要来)"	Mushroom Brothers

== Ratings ==
Episode #	Original broadcast date	Average audience share (CSM50)		Average audience share (National Average)		Ranking in its timeslot
Episode #	Original broadcast date	Ratings	Audience share	Ratings	Audience share	Ranking in its timeslot
1-2	June 16, 2015	1.363	3.972	2.26	7.06	1
3-4	June 17, 2015	1.354	4.036	2.29	7.22	1
5-6	June 18, 2015	1.416	4.298	2.57	8.27	1
7	June 19, 2015	0.86	2.88			
8	June 20, 2015	0.826	2.86			
9-10	June 21, 2015	1.367	4.1			
11-12	June 22, 2015	1.519	4.45	2.5	7.93	1
13-14	June 23, 2015	1.551	4.56	2.84	8.59	1
15-16	June 24, 2015	1.585	4.6	2.79	8.44	1
17-18	June 25, 2015	1.639	4.74	2.74	8.55	1
19	June 26, 2015	0.85	2.68			
20	June 27, 2015	0.905	2.92			
21-22	June 28, 2015	1.417	4.08			
23-24	June 29, 2015	1.459	4.25	2.68	8.20	1
25-26	June 30, 2015	1.506	4.42			
27-28	July 1, 2015	1.659	4.9	2.85	8.95	1
29-30	July 2, 2015	1.761	5.18	3.16	9.72	1
31	July 3, 2015	0.921	2.93			
32	July 4, 2015	1.046	3.3			
33-34	July 5, 2015	1.704	4.85			
35-36	July 6, 2015	2.099	6.16	3.26		1
37-38	July 7, 2015	2.06	6.11	3.24		1
39-40	July 8, 2015	2.167	5.88	3.47	10.87	1
41-42	July 9, 2015	2.339	6.83	3.93	12.12	
43	July 10, 2015	1.132	3.7			
44	July 11, 2015	1.495	4.782			
Average		1.557	4.636			

== Awards and nominations ==
Year	Award	Category	Nominated work	Result	Ref.
2015	2nd Hengdian Film and TV Festival of China	Rising Star Award	Wang Xiuzhu	Won	
