= An Inaccurate Memoir =

- Film poster
- Traditional Chinese: 匹夫
- Simplified Chinese: 匹夫
- Hanyu Pinyin: Pǐfū
- Directed by: Yang Shupeng
- Written by: Fu Dandi; Zhang Xiaobei; Yang Shupeng; Huang Lao
- Produced by: Ronald Wong; Huang Bin
- Starring: Huang Xiaoming; Zhang Yi; Zhang Xinyi; Ni Jingyang; Wang Lie; Tino Bao; Sun Lei; Didi Zhang; Ma Zhiming
- Cinematography: Cao Yu
- Edited by: Fang Lei; Eric Myerson; Yang Shupeng
- Music by: Peng Kaili
- Production company: Beijing Enlight Pictures
- Release date: 24 April 2012
- Running time: 105 minutes
- Country: China
- Language: Mandarin

An Inaccurate Memoir (Chinese: 匹夫), also known as Eastern Bandits, is a 2012 Chinese thriller film directed by Yang Shupeng.

== Plot ==
Gao, a Chinese soldier and a bandit member, seeks revenge from the Japanese with the help of bandits.

== Cast ==
- Huang Xiaoming as Fang
- Zhang Yi as Gao
- Zhang Xinyi as Jen (Fang's sister)
- Ni Jingyang as Lady Dagger
- Wang Lie as Kuei
- Tino Bao as Charlatan, a Manchu-Mongolian bandit
- Sun Lei as San Pao
- Zhang Yue as Lassie
- Didi Zhang
- Ma Zhiming
