= Tianxia Bachang =

Author of Chinese fantasy novels

- 天下霸唱
- Born: Zhang Muye; 1978 (age 47–48); Tianjin, China
- Occupation: author

Zhang Muye (Chinese: 张牧野, born 1978), more commonly known by his pen name Tianxia Bachang (Chinese: 天下霸唱), is a Chinese author. Zhang's fantasy web series Ghost Blows Out the Light began the tomb-robbing genre of Chinese fantasy fiction. The series has been adapted into a number of other entertainment media.

== Biography ==
Zhang was born in 1978 in Tianjin, China.

In 2007, Zhang sold Ghost Blows Out the Light to Xuanting. Zhang's contract promised 1.5 million RMB and 40% of revenue generated by adaptations of the work and stated that he could not write works with the same or similar title. This resulted in litigation over the web drama Strange Tales of Muye (based on Zhang's novel of the same name) which Zhang and his collaborators on the subsequent project lost.

== Works ==
Zhang's fantasy series Ghost Blows Out the Light, serialized online from 2006 to 2008, began the tomb-robbing subgenre of Chinese fantasy. These stories are quest narratives emphasizing their action and adventure elements. Ghost Blows Out the Light has been adapted into film, TV, web dramas, and video games.

Zhang's narrators often provide asides on sciences like geology, archaeology, and paleontology, as well as folk religious practices like feng shui or divination techniques.

== Influences ==
Zhang cites as among his influences Hollywood films like Indiana Jones, which were pirated into China in the 1980s.
