= Mojin: The Worm Valley =

Chinese film

- Simplified Chinese: 云南虫谷
- Directed by: Fei Xing
- Starring: Cai Heng; Gu Xuan; Yu Heng; Chen Yusi; Ma Yuke; Cheng Taishen
- Release date: 29 December 2018 (China)
- Running time: 110 Minutes
- Country: China
- Language: Mandarin

Mojin: The Worm Valley (Chinese: 云南虫谷) is a 2018 Chinese action adventure fantasy film. It was directed by Fei Xing and stars Cai Heng, Gu Xuan, Yu Heng, and Chen Yusi. The film was released in Mainland China on December 29, 2018.

== Plot ==
Thousands of years ago, the evil Princess Jingjue cast the cruel Ghost Eye Curse upon her own people to subjugate them. The curse will kill whomever is afflicted when they turn 40. Crueler still was that the curse will be passed down from one generation to the next. The only way to lift the curse is to retrieve and bring together the Dragon Bone Celestial Tome and the Mu Chen Orb. The former had been retrieved in a previous adventure but the Mu Chen Orb is still to be found.

After translating most of the ancient text on the Dragon Bone Celestial Tome, Hu Bayi and Professor Sun determine that the Mu Chen Orb is located in Emperor Xian's Tomb in the ancient Longfeng Mountains in the Yunnan Province. Bayi, Professor Sun and Shirley Yang visit Chen Yukou for the translation of the last sentence of the Dragon Bone Celestial Tome. But Chen is half-mad and half-consumed by regret and offers them little help aside from warning them to "never look into its eyes."

Bayi, Shirley, Professor Sun, Zhou Linglong, Wang Kaixuan (nicknamed Fatty) and Jin Ya (nicknamed Gold Tooth) travel to the Yunnan province. On the way, they encounter in a landslide the Chongshu, a form of witchcraft where in a person is infested with deadly insects and is encased in stone. They meet up with Cai Yun, who manages a small, remote hotel, and her daughter Kong Que.

That night, the group watches the Flameflies outside the hotel and Kong Que shows them the Flamefly Queen which she has caught in a glass jar. Kong Que tells them that Flameflies are blind and will follow the smell of the Queen loyally. However the jar hides her scent. Furthermore, the insects will burst into flames when they die and will follow the Queen to her death. Fatty takes the jar of the Flamefly Queen from Kong Que.

The next day, Kong Que guides the group to the secret underground waterway leading to the Worm Valley. Kong Que warns them that the Valley will be filled with toxic gas at night and they must reach the Floating Island to survive. The group soon encounters a school of carnivorous fish as well as the deadly insects that emerge from the Chongshu hanging from the cave ceiling. The group make it to the Worm Valley but they now must contend with giant armored lizards. After a struggle against both the lizards and time, the group reach the safety of the Floating Island. There, the group takes the time to rest and recuperate.

They head out the next day and cross through the Field of Skull Flowers before eventually ending up in a cemetery by the river. The cemetery is guarded by the Deathless Crab of the Huo Clan. After a lengthy battle with the Crab, Bayi is able to kill it by attracting the carnivorous fish from before and getting them to devour the beast. However it is revealed that Linglong was mortally wounded during the fight and she dies surrounded by her friends. They place her body in an empty coffin and set it on the river where it will eventually drift to the same spot where they originally entered.

Professor Sun tries to convince the group to turn back while they still can. But Bayi is determined to end the curse and urges them on to continue. Professor Sun leaves in tears to return home alone.

Bayi, Shirley, Fatty and Gold Tooth climb up the Bone Ladder and reach the Golden Palace where Emperor Xian's Tomb is found. The group then battles a swarm of monstrous scorpions to get to the Mu Chen Orb. When Bayi grabs the Orb, the bells of the Palace start ringing and the scorpions suddenly flee. The bells begin to disorient the group and the mountain behind the Tomb crumbles revealing the Snake King. Shirley tells her companions not to look into its eyes, just as Chen had warned. Now they must decide to either submit to the Snake King or face it in battle. Bayi stands defiant and once again urges his friends to fight with him.

Bayi plans to use the Flamefly Queen in Fatty's possession to destroy the Snake King. However the jar is destroy during the fight, freeing the Queen and drawing the other Flameflies to her. As the Flamefly Queen starts to fly away, it is caught by Professor Sun who had returned. As Professor Sun is slowly burnt by the Flamefly Queen, he runs towards the Snake King and lunges into its mouth with the Flameflies flying in after him, burning the Snake King from the inside. The dying Snake King destroys the mountain behind him unleashing the waters behind it. Bayi, Shirley, Fatty and Gold Tooth mourn the Professor's death and flee.

The group retrieve Linglong's body and return home. After paying their final respects to fallen comrades, they bring together the Dragon Bone Celestial Tome and the Mu Chen Orb. But rather than the curse being lifted, it points them instead to their next adventure.

== Cast ==
- Heng Cai as Hu Bayi
- Xuan Gu as Shirley Yang
- Heng Yu as Wang Kaixuan / Fatty
- Marc Ma as Jin Ya / Gold Tooth
- Yusi Chen as Zhou Linglong
- Taishen Cheng as Professor Sun
- Chihi-Wei Tang as Zhou Jiuye
- Tsung-Hua Tou as Chen Yukou / Blind Chen
- Lu Xu as Cai Yun
- Yun'er Zhu as Kong Que
- Luyao Zhang and Yuanyuan Liu as Princess Jingjue
