= Xu Zheng (actor) =

Chinese actor and filmmaker (born 1972)

- Xu in 2024
- Born: 18 April 1972 (age 54); Shanghai, China
- Education: Shanghai Theatre Academy
- Occupations: Actor, director, screenwriter, producer
- Years active: 1996–present
- Spouse: Tao Hong (m. 2002)
- Children: 1
- Awards: 'China Movie Channel Media Awards; Favourite Actor; 2009 One Night in Supermarket; Beijing College Student Film Festival; Favourite Director; 2013 Lost in Thailand; China Film Director's Guild Awards; Best Actor; 2014 No Man's Land; Chinese American Film Festival; Best Actor; 2015 Lost in Hong Kong; Changchun Film Festival; Best Actor; 2018 Dying to Survive

Chinese name
- Traditional Chinese: 徐崢
- Simplified Chinese: 徐峥
Transcriptions
Standard Mandarin
- Hanyu Pinyin: Xú Zhēng

Xu Zheng (simplified Chinese: 徐峥; traditional Chinese: 徐崢; pinyin: Xú Zhēng; born 18 April 1972) is a Chinese actor and filmmaker best known for acting in comedic roles. Xu found fame with the comedy TV series Sunny Piggy (2000). He followed with comedy TV dramas Li Wei the Magistrate (2001) and Love Through Different Times (2002), as well as comedy films Call for Love (2007) and Lost on Journey (2010).

Xu is a frequent collaborator with director Ning Hao, in films such as No Man's Land (2013) and Breakup Buddies (2014). Xu directed, co-wrote, co-produced, and starred in Lost in Thailand (2012) and Lost in Hong Kong (2015), two of the highest-grossing films in China. He also co-produced and starred in Dying to Survive (2018), for which he won the Golden Horse Award for Best Leading Actor. Xu ranked 38th on Forbes China Celebrity 100 list in 2013, 68th in 2015, 92nd in 2017, 4th in 2019, and 2nd in 2020.

== Biography ==
Growing up in Shanghai, Xu Zheng performed regularly in Children's Palace theatres. After graduating from Shanghai Theatre Academy in 1994, Xu portrayed mostly minor roles on television and film for years. His big break came in 2000 with the romance TV series Sunny Piggy, in which he portrayed the dimwitted protagonist Zhu Bajie. Sunny Piggy received high ratings nationally, paving way for other popular TV dramas such as Li Wei the Magistrate (2001) and Love Through Different Times (2002). Since appearing in Ning Hao's Crazy Stone (2006), Xu also began to turn more and more to comedy films, starring in Call for Love (2007) and One Night in Supermarket (2009). He also worked with Ning Hao again in Crazy Racer (2009) and No Man's Land (2013).

Xu had wanted to try his hands in filmmaking since acting was, in his words, "too passive". After the success of the comedy road film Lost on Journey (2010), Xu invited his co-star Wang Baoqiang to join his directorial debut Lost in Thailand, a film with the same premise. However, as a first-time director, Xu had a difficult time selling his story, meeting with 3 different production companies before convincing Beijing Enlight Pictures to invest US$4 million. Huang Bo, Xu's good friend and frequent co-star in Ning's films, also joined the project. Released in December 2012, Lost in Thailand raked in over US$200 million from about 40 million people to become the highest-grossing domestic film in China's history. Shot mainly in Thailand, the film greatly boosted tourism to the country, and Xu even received a private meeting with the Thai prime minister Yingluck Shinawatra in 2013.

In 2014, Ning's comedy road film Breakup Buddies starring Xu and Huang Bo grossed over US$195 million to become the highest-grossing domestic film of the year. Xu's second directorial feature Lost in Hong Kong (2015), which he again starred in, co-wrote and co-produced, broke Lost in Thailand's Chinese 2-D film grossing record with US$250 million.

In 2019, he produced the romantic comedy film Love You Forever, which was released nationwide on December 31, 2019. On February 5, the comedy sci-fi film Crazy Alien, in which he made a cameo appearance, was released. In July, he served as the director for the segment The Champion in the film My People, My Country, a tribute to the 70th anniversary of the founding of the People's Republic of China. On October 7, Xu Zheng's cumulative box office exceeded 10 billion yuan, ranking him among the top in Chinese film history. On October 16, the latest character reveal and trailer for Lost in Russia, the latest film in the Lost in series directed, starred, produced, and written by Xu Zheng, were released. Due to the COVID-19 pandemic, it was made available for free streaming on Xigua Video on the first day of the Lunar New Year in 2020. In November, Xu Zheng won the Best Director Award at the 3rd Golden Screen Awards for the film My People, My Country. On December 8, Xu Zheng presented the Best Film award at the 2nd Hainan Island International Film Festival.

== Personal life ==
Xu first shaved his head while in college and has maintained the look ever since.

Xu married his Sunny Piggy co-star Tao Hong in 2002. They have portrayed a married couple in Unfinished Girl (2007) and Lost in Thailand. Other collaborations include Sky Lovers (2002 TV series), No Lonely Angels (2002 film), The Last Red Hot Lover (2005–06 theatre production), No Man's Land, and How Long Will I Love U. Tao also made a cameo in Lost in Hong Kong. Their daughter was born on December 30, 2008, in Beijing.

In November 2012, Xu was photographed by Fengxing Studio entering and leaving a KTV venue and hotel with Wang Xiran, a Central Drama Academy student. Xu denied an affair. In July 2017, Xu assaulted a female photographer from Feng Xing Studio.

== Filmography ==
=== Film ===
Year	English title	Original title	Role	Notes/Ref.
1989	In One Married Year	结婚一年间	Tiantian	TV film
1992	Their Marriages	父子婚事	Xiao Sheng	
1998	The Soul of the Sea	海之魂	Xiaoman	
1999	Something About Secret	说出你的秘密	Zhang	
2002	No Lonely Angels	天使不寂寞	Zhao	
2003	A Surprise Victory	出奇制胜	Sanduo	TV film
2006	The Happy Fate of Love	家和万事兴之快乐情缘	Ding Zihan	TV film
2006	Crazy Stone	疯狂的石头	Feng Hai	
2007	Call for Love	爱情呼叫转移	Xu Lang	
2007	Unfinished Girl	第三个人	He Wei	
2007	Crossed Lines	命运呼叫转移	Dr. Sun	Segment 1: "The Misunderstanding" (误会)
2008	Fit Lover	爱情左右	Xu Lang	
2009	Crazy Racer	疯狂的赛车	Cemetery manager	
2009	One Night in Supermarket	夜·店	He Sanshui	Also administrative producer
2009	Mars Baby	火星没事	Ma Zhihao	
2010	Lost on Journey	人在囧途	Li Chenggong	
2010	The Swordman Dream	嘻遊記	Tang Sanju	
2011	The Founding of a Party	建黨偉業	Xu Shuzheng	Some scenes were deleted
2011	Legend of a Rabbit	兔俠傳奇	Crocodile bandit	Only has voice role
2012	Love in the Buff	春嬌與志明	Sam	
2012	Meet the In-Laws	搞定岳父大人	Fan Jianqiang	Also the supervising producer
2012	Lost in Thailand	人再囧途之泰囧	Xu Lang	Also the director, co-producer, and co-writer
2013	Fake Fiction	摩登年代	Ou Dawei	
2013	One Night Surprise	一夜惊喜	He Fengfeng	
2013	No Man's Land	无人区	Pan Xiao	
2014	The Great Hypnotist	催眠大师	Xu Ruining	Also the executive producer
2014	Breakup Buddies	心花路放	Hao Yi	
2015	Lost in Hong Kong	港囧	Xu Lai	Also the director, co-producer, and co-writer
2016	Xuanzang	大唐玄奘	Li Daliang	
2018	A or B	幕后玩家	Zhong Xiaonian	Also executive producer
2018	Ash Is Purest White	江湖儿女	Man from Karamay	
2018	How Long Will I Love U	超时空同居	Noodle chef	Also the original story and producer
2018	Dying to Survive	我不是药神	Cheng Yong	Also the co-producer
2018	The Island	一出好戏		Cameo
2019	Crazy Alien	疯狂的外星人	Alien	
2019	Robosaur Wars			
2019	My People, My Country	我和我的祖国		Director of Part 3: The Champion
2020	Lost in Russia	囧妈	Xu Ivan	Also the director
2020	My People, My Homeland	我和我的家乡	Xiao Fan	Also the director
2021	My Country, My Parents	我和我的父辈	Zhao Pingyang	Also the director of Part 3: AD MAN

=== Miniseries ===
Year	English title	Original title	Role	Notes
2006	It's So Good to Be In Love	恋爱真好	Dou Ding	Sitcom
2010	Unusually Crazy for Love	非常爱情狂	President Xu	Web sitcom
2018	The Island	好戏一出		Web miniseries

=== TV series ===
Year	English title	Original title	Role	Notes
1994	Little Stories from the Orient	東方小故事	Bao Xuan	Episode: "Bao Xuan Gets Married" (鮑宣娶親)
1996	Hu Xueyan	胡雪巖	Huang Zuoqing	
1997	Soaring to the Sky	风生水起		Segment: "The Stock Market" (股市)
1997	Zhou Enlai in Shanghai	周恩來在上海	Wang Ming	
1998	Vicissitude of Shanghai	上海滄桑	Tang Boye	
1998	The Beauty of the Warring States	戰國紅顏	Shi Sha	
1999	It's So Annoying at Home	家里比较烦	Xiaogua	Sitcom
2000	Red Dust from the Past	紅塵往事	Li Xinzhi	
2000	Sunny Piggy	春光燦爛豬八戒	Zhu Fengchun; Zhu Bajie	
2001	Imperial Envoy of the 7th Grade	七品欽差	Zhou	
2001	Li Wei the Magistrate	李衛當官	Li Wei	
2002	Love Through Different Times	穿越时空的爱恋	Zhu Yunwen	
2002	Sky Lovers	天空下的缘分	Flatfish	Segment 5: "Sun Tanning" (日光浴)
2002	Daddy's Name is Hongqi	爸爸叫红旗	Feng Yong	
2003	The Return to Shanghai Bund	重返上海灘	Zhu Shijun	
2003	The Eight Hilarious Gods: Sunü's Story	笑八仙之素女的故事	Lü Dongbin	
2003	The Showroom Tales	售楼处的故事	Deng Feng	Sitcom
2004	Thirteen Sons of Heaven Bridge	天橋十三郎	Shi Yukun	
2004	Li Wei the Magistrate II	李衛當官II	Li Wei	Also the co-director, sequel to the 2001 series
2004	The Execution of Chen Shimei	新鍘美案	Emperor Renzong of Song; Emperor Zhenzong	Emperor Zhenzong only appears in flashbacks
2004	The Perfect Banquet	滿漢全席	Zhang Dongguan	
2004	My Way	起跑天堂	Gym customer	
2005	Thrice Revealing the Emperor's Edict	三揭皇榜	Fu Yingxing	
2005	The Lucky Stars	福祿壽·三星報喜	Zhang Guolao	
2006	Crazy King and General Iron	鐵將軍阿貴	Hongzhou, Prince He	
2006	To Live to Love	长恨歌	Kang Mingxun	
2007	Be a Man	好男当家	Zhou Feng	
2008	The Melody of Wedding	结婚进行曲	Yao Xiang	
2008	Firewall 5788	防火墙5788	He Nian	
2009	Distant Mountain	遠山	Commissioner Xie	
2009	I'm a Boss	我是老板	Xu Tianlai	
2010	Run Daddy Run	老爸快跑	Zhang San	
2010	The Amateur Imperial Bodyguard	大內低手	Li Chuanwei; Zhao Sanfa	
2012	The Bachelor	大男当婚	Cao Xiaoqiang	
2017	A Splendid Life in Beijing	生逢灿烂的日子	Passenger	
2018	The Drug Hunter	猎毒人	Wu Xiong	

=== Reality shows ===
- 2016: Twenty-Four Hours (二十四小时) on Zhejiang Television
- 2016: Lost in Food (食在囧途) on Zhejiang Television
- 2018: I Am an Actor (我就是演员) on Zhejiang Television

== Theatre ==
A member of the Shanghai Dramatic Arts Centre, Xu was a stage star before finding fame in television and film. He starred in Chinese versions of The Liar (as Lelio), Long Day's Journey into Night (as Jamie), Much Ado About Nothing (as Antonio), and Art (as Serge), as well as many Chinese plays in both Mandarin and Shanghainese. He also directed at least 3 plays as early as 1998. In 2005, he and Tao Hong starred in a 2-person play adapted from the Broadway comedy Last of the Red Hot Lovers, which caused a sensation in Beijing. The couple subsequently performed the play over 30 times in 10 major cities, receiving overwhelming support everywhere that they canceled their holiday travel plans for more performances.

== Awards and nominations ==
Year	#	Award	Category	Work	Result
Film & TV
2008	29th	Hundred Flowers Awards	Best Supporting Actor	Crazy Stone	Nominated
2009	6th	China Movie Channel Media Awards	Favourite Actor	One Night in Supermarket	Won
2010	4th	Huading Awards (TV Drama)	Best Supporting Actor	I'm a Boss	Nominated
2012	4th	TV Drama Awards Made in China	Best Actor	The Bachelor	Nominated
2013	15th	Huabiao Awards	Outstanding Young Director	Lost in Thailand	Won
2013	9th	Huading Awards (Film)	Best New Director	Lost in Thailand	Won
2013	20th	Beijing College Student Film Festival	Favourite Director	Lost in Thailand	Won
2013	4th	Youth Film Handbook Awards	Best New Director	Lost in Thailand	Won
2013	4th	Youth Film Handbook Awards	Best Actor	Lost in Thailand	Nominated
2013	4th	China Film Director's Guild Awards	Best Director	Lost in Thailand	Nominated
2013	4th	China Film Director's Guild Awards	Best Screenwriter	Lost in Thailand	Nominated
2013	4th	China Film Director's Guild Awards	Best Actor	Lost in Thailand	Nominated
2014	32nd	Hundred Flowers Awards	Best Actor	Lost in Thailand	Nominated
2014	5th	China Film Director's Guild Awards	Best Actor	No Man's Land	Won
2015	11th	Chinese American Film Festival	Best Actor	Lost in Hong Kong	Won
2018	14th	Changchun Film Festival	Best Actor	Dying to Survive	Won
2018	55th	Golden Horse Awards	Best Actor	Dying to Survive	Won
2019	13th	Asian Film Awards	Best Actor	Dying to Survive	Nominated
2019	26th	Beijing College Student Film Festival	Best Actor	Dying to Survive	Won
2019	17th	Golden Phoenix Awards	Society Award	Dying to Survive	Won
2019	32nd	Golden Rooster Awards	Best Actor	Dying to Survive	Nominated
Theatre
1998	10th	Magnolia Stage Awards	Best Actor	Color of Shares	Co-winner
1999	3rd	Zuolin Drama Arts Awards	Best Actor	Color of Shares	Won
2002	6th	Zuolin Drama Arts Awards	Best Actor	Art	Won
2008	12th	Zuolin Drama Arts Awards	Best Actor	Brothers	Co-winner
2008	18th	Magnolia Stage Awards	Best Actor	Brothers	Co-winner
2011	15th	Zuolin Drama Arts Awards	Best Actor	Das Kapital	Nominated
2011	2nd	One Drama Awards	Best Actor	Das Kapital	Won
