= 35th Golden Horse Awards =

Award ceremony for Chinese-language films of 1997 and 1998

- Date: December 12, 1998
- Site: Sun Yat-sen Memorial Hall, Taipei, Taiwan
- Hosted by: Jacky Wu and Isabel Kao
- Preshow hosts: Jeff Locker
- Organized by: Taipei Golden Horse Film Festival Executive Committee

Highlights
- Best Feature Film: Xiu Xiu: The Sent Down Girl
- Best Director: Joan Chen; Xiu Xiu: The Sent Down Girl
- Best Actor: Lobsang Chompel; Xiu Xiu: The Sent Down Girl
- Best Actress: Li Xiaolu; Xiu Xiu: The Sent Down Girl
- Most awards: Xiu Xiu: The Sent Down Girl (7)
- Most nominations: Xiu Xiu: The Sent Down Girl (11); City of Glass (11)

Television in Taiwan
- Channel: CTV; Star Chinese Movies
- Ratings: 1.89% (average)

The 35th Golden Horse Awards (Mandarin:第35屆金馬獎) took place on December 12, 1998 at the Sun Yat-sen Memorial Hall in Taipei, Taiwan.

== Winners and nominees ==
Winners are listed first and highlighted in boldface.

**Best Feature Film**: **Xiu Xiu: The Sent Down Girl**; The Personals; Who Am I?; City of Glass; Your Place or Mine!; Flowers of Shanghai	**Best Short Film** -
**Best Documentary**: **A Secret Buried for 50 Years - A Story of Taiwanese Comfort Woman**; Firefly; The Life of the Formosan Sika Deer	**Best Animation** **no winner**: Grandma and Her Ghosts; The End of the World
**Best Director**: **Joan Chen — Xiu Xiu: The Sent Down Girl**; Hou Hsiao-hsien — Flowers of Shanghai; Mabel Cheung — City of Glass; Chen Kuo-fu — The Personals	**Best Leading Actor**: **Lobsang Chompel — Xiu Xiu: The Sent Down Girl**; Anthony Wong — Beast Cops; Leon Lai — City of Glass; Tony Leung Chiu-wai — Your Place or Mine!
**Best Leading Actress**: **Li Xiaolu — Xiu Xiu: The Sent Down Girl**; Rene Liu — The Personals; Yang Kuei-mei — The Hole; Sandra Ng — Portland Street Blues	**Best Supporting Actor**: **Eric Tsang — Hold You Tight**; Ku Pao-ming — My Rice Noodle Shop; Wang Chao-ming — The Personals; Alex Fong — Your Place or Mine!
**Best Supporting Actress**: **Shu Qi — Portland Street Blues**; Tsai Tsan-te — Bad Girl Trilogy; Suki Kwan — Your Place or Mine!; Amanda Lee — 9413
**Audience Choice Award**: **City of Glass**	**Grand Jury Award**: **Flowers of Shanghai**
**Special Jury Award**: **Rene Liu — The Personals**	**Lifetime Achievement Award**: **Chou Tien-su**
