= Tao Hong (actress, born 1972) =

Chinese actress and former synchronized swimmer

- 陶虹
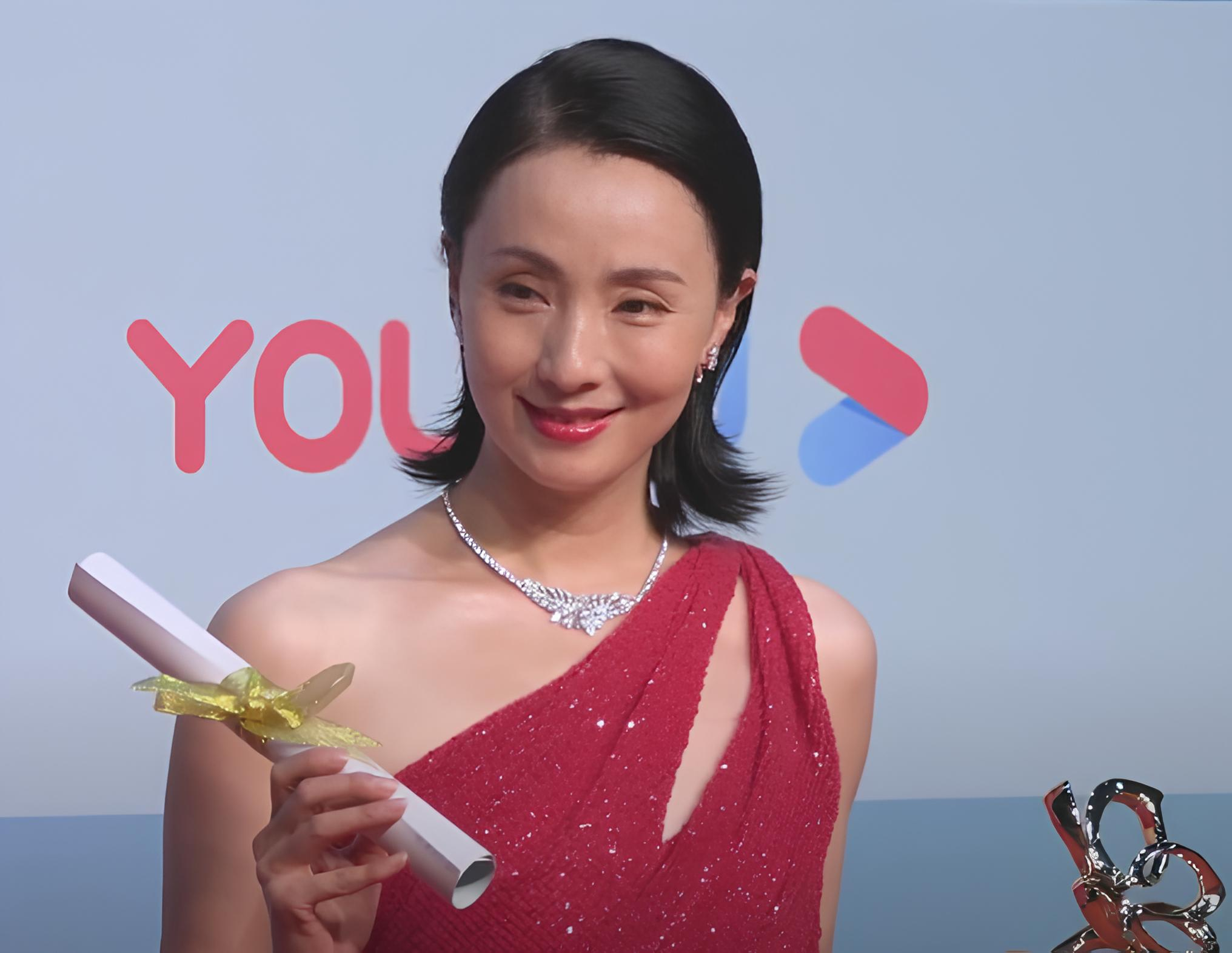
- Born: 15 January 1972 (age 54); Wuxi, Jiangsu, China
- Education: Central Academy of Drama
- Spouse: Xu Zheng (m. 2002)
- Children: 1
- Awards: Damascus International Film Festival; Best Actress; 1997 Colors of the Blind; Deauville Asian Film Festival; Best Actress; 2000 Colors of the Blind; Beijing College Student Film Festival; Best Actress; 1999 A Beautiful New World; 2015 Forgetting to Know You; Chunyan Awards; Best Supporting Actress; 2013 Yang Shanzhou; China Movie Channel Media Awards; Best Actress; 2014 Forgetting to Know You; Huabiao Awards – Outstanding Actress; 1998 Colors of the Blind Golden Rooster Awards – Best Actress; 1998 Colors of the Blind Hundred Flowers Awards – Best Supporting Actress; 2000 Agreed Not to Separate

Tao Hong (Chinese: 陶虹; born 15 January 1972) is a Chinese actress and former synchronised swimmer. A National Games of China champion, Tao was part of the Chinese national team at several synchronised swimming competitions from 1987 to 1991, including the 1991 World Aquatics Championships.

As an actress, Tao has received wide acclaim for films like Colors of the Blind (1997) and Forgetting to Know You (2013), though she is better known for hit TV dramas like Sunny Piggy (2000), Nothing in the Mirror (2002), Chuncao (2007) and The Red (2014). Internationally, Tao is probably best known for her small role in the Academy Award-winning film The Red Violin (1998).

== Athletic career ==
Tao Hong
Personal information
- National team: China
- Height: 164 cm (5 ft 5 in)
- Weight: 50 kg (110 lb)

Sport
- Sport: Swimming
- Strokes: Synchronized swimming
- Club: Beijing Synchronized Swimming Team (1984–1994)

Tao Hong began practicing with the Beijing Synchronized Swimming Team in 1983 when she was 11. In 1984, she officially made the team. She made the national team for the first time in 1987.

At the 1991 World Aquatics Championships, China finished 6th, which would remain China's best finish at the event until 2007. Although a member of the national team, Tao missed both the 1988 and the 1992 Olympics, since she was slightly weaker than her teammates Tan Min, Guan Zewen, and Wang Xiaojie at solo and duet competitions, and team competition did not become an Olympic event until 1996 after she retired to pursue acting.

=== Notable National Competitions ===
| Event | Competition | Result | Rank | Partner/Teammates |
|---|---|---|---|---|
| 1989 National Synchronized Swimming Championships | duet routine | | 3rd | Ren Na |
| 1991 National Synchronized Swimming Championships | team routine | | 3rd | |
| 1992 National Synchronized Swimming Championships | team routine | | 1st | Ren Na, Zhao Bin, Kong Rui, Gao Ya, Yan Xiaohui, Wu Mei, Li Fei |
| 1993 7th National Games of China | team routine | 180.35 | 1st | Ren Na, Zhao Bin, Kong Rui, Gao Ya, Yan Xiaohui, Wu Mei, Li Fei |

=== International Competitions ===
| Event | Competition | Result | Rank | Partner/Teammates |
|---|---|---|---|---|
| 1987 8th Pan Pacific Synchronized Swimming Championships | team routine | 163.71 | 5th | |
| 1988 French Open for Synchronized Swimming | duet routine | 171.47 | 5th | Ren Na |
| 1988 French Open for Synchronized Swimming | team routine | 169.19 | 4th | |
| 1990 4th American Cup for Synchronized Swimming | duet routine | 167.885 | 3rd | Tan Min |
| 1990 4th American Cup for Synchronized Swimming | team routine | 167.415 | 3rd | |
| 1991 6th World Aquatics Championships | team routine | 179.835 | 6th | Tan Min, Guan Zewen, Wang Xiaojie, Luo Xi, Long Yan, Jiang Jie, Li Jia, Fu Yan |
| 1991 5th FINA Synchronized Swimming World Cup | team routine | 91.78 | 5th | |

== Acting career ==
In August 1993, Jiang Wen, who had been preparing for his directorial debut In the Heat of the Sun, went to the Beijing Synchronized Swimming Team looking for a good swimmer for his female lead. Even though Tao did not remotely fit the physical description of the role, Jiang liked her smile so much that he invited her to his set for a supporting role. The film was a big hit, and at the suggestion of Jiang, she retired from the Beijing club and applied to 3 professional acting schools: Central Academy of Drama, Beijing Film Academy and Shanghai Theatre Academy, all highly prestigious and selective. She was accepted to all 3 and chose Central Academy of Drama. She was the class president and became the first student in school history (along with classmate Duan Yihong) to receive a perfect grade. In 2015, she participated in the making of a music video of The Hopes of President Xi.

== Filmography ==
=== Films ===
| Year | English title | Original title | Role | Notes |
|---|---|---|---|---|
| 1994 | In the Heat of the Sun | 阳光灿烂的日子 | Yu Beibei | |
| 1997 | Colors of the Blind | 黑眼睛 | Ding Lihua | |
| 1998 | The Red Violin | | Chen Gang | |
| 1999 | A Beautiful New World | 美丽新世界 | Huang Jinfang | |
| 1999 | Agreed Not to Separate | 说好不分手 | Lu Xinxin | |
| 2000 | As Good As Happiness | 开心就好 | Yu Lan | TV film |
| 2000 | Happy Times | 幸福时光 | trailer visitor | |
| 2000 | Bright Heart | 明亮的心 | Li Ruyi | |
| 2002 | Sky Lovers | 天上的恋人 | Zhu Ling | |
| 2002 | Top Danger | 极度险情 | Jing Hui | |
| 2002 | No Lonely Angels | 天使不寂寞 | He Jialing | |
| 2003 | Sky of Love | 情牵一线 | Su Yaqin | |
| 2004 | Master of Everything | 自娱自乐 | Alian | |
| 2005 | Lilac Blossom | 十全十美之丁香花开 | Liu Sihua | TV film |
| 2005 | Mystery | 秘密 | Xiao Xiao | TV film |
| 2006 | In the Blue | 浅蓝深蓝 | Kevin's mother | |
| 2006 | Aspirin | 阿司匹林 | herself | cameo |
| 2007 | 3 City Hotshots | 第三种温暖 | waitress | |
| 2007 | Unfinished Girl | 第三个人 | Xiao Feng | |
| 2008 | Marriage Trap | 婚礼2008 | Ding Xiaotao | |
| 2010 | Here Comes Fortune | 財神到 | Yang Sujuan | |
| 2010 | My Belle Boss | 我的美女老板 | coffee shop owner | |
| 2010 | You Deserve to Be Single | 活该你单身 | Zhou Mei | |
| 2011 | People Mountain People Sea | 人山人海 | Tianxin | |
| 2011 | Yang Shanzhou | 杨善洲 | Yang Jinglan | |
| 2012 | Guns and Roses | 黃金大劫案 | Fang Die | |
| 2012 | Lost in Thailand | 人再囧途之泰囧 | An-an | |
| 2013 | Forgetting to Know You | 忘了去懂你 | Chen Xuesong | |
| 2013 | No Man's Land | 无人区 | Ms. Xing | |
| 2015 | Lost in Hong Kong | 港囧 | award presenter | cameo |
| 2016 | Mr. Nian | 年兽大作战 | Granny | voice acting |
| 2018 | How Long Will I Love U | 超时空同居 | Shop manageress | |
| 2019 | My People, My Country | 我和我的祖国 | | |
| 2019 | Adoring | 宠爱 | | |
| 2020 | My People, My Homeland | 我和我的家乡 | Jiang Xiaohong | |

=== Television ===
| Year | English title | Original title | Role | Notes |
|---|---|---|---|---|
| 1996 | Dragon Pearl | 龙珠 | Yang Na | |
| 1996 | The Story of Hong Kong | 香港的故事 | Zheng Adai (young) | |
| 1996 | Men Actually Work the Hardest | 其实男人最辛苦 | Didi | |
| 1997 | Paging Mother | 寻呼妈妈 | Mu Qing | |
| 1997 | The Bright Mirror Hangs High | 明鏡高懸 | Gao Mingjing | |
| 1998 | Records of Kangxi's Travel Incognito | 康熙微服私訪記 | Luo Jinhong | |
| 1998 | Let's Meet in a Bar | 相约酒吧 | Ye'er | |
| 1999 | Where Dreams Began | 梦开始的地方 | Xiaohui | |
| 1999 | Divorce | 离婚 | Madame Ma | |
| 1999 | Beautiful Women | 千娇百媚 | Yujiao & Yumei | |
| 2000 | Star Creation | 明星制造 | Shen Yun | |
| 2000 | Sunny Piggy | 春光燦爛豬八戒 | Xiaolongnü | |
| 2000 | The Love Station | 爱情驿站 | Liu Qingqing | |
| 2000 | Unusual Cases | 非常案件 | Wei Yu | |
| 2000 | The Chinese Hero | 中華英豪 | Bizhu | |
| 2001 | No Longer Able to Give Up | 欲罢不能 | Teacher Liu | |
| 2001 | Human Worm | 人虫 | Tao Hong | herself |
| 2001 | A Laughing Stock | 贻笑大方 | Zhuang Wenjing | |
| 2002 | Nothing in the Mirror | 空镜子 | Sun Yan | |
| 2002 | Sky Lovers | 天空下的缘分 | Xiaotao | Segment 5: "Sun Tanning" (日光浴) |
| 2003 | The Heaven Sword and Dragon Saber | 倚天屠龍記 | Ji Xiaofu | |
| 2003 | Not-So-Distant Neighbors | 相邻不远 | Su Tingting | |
| 2003 | Everyone Ready | 各就各位 | Jia Li | |
| 2004 | Back of the Sun | 太阳背面 | Gong Ni | |
| 2004 | The Woman Behind the Woman | 女人背后的女人 | Azi | |
| 2004 | Lotus Flowers From Water | 出水芙蓉 | Lin Ting | |
| 2005 | Xianfeng Dynasty: Fantasies Behind A Curtain | 咸豐王朝之一簾幽夢 | Yehenara Lan'er | |
| 2005 | Underground Transport Stations | 地下交通站 | Lin Jing | |
| 2005 | The Emperor in Han Dynasty | 漢武大帝 | Liu Ling | |
| 2005 | No Matter What, Don't Get Emotional | 动什么别动感情 | He Jiaqi | |
| 2005 | Emphasis Detect | 立案侦查 | Ye Qiang & Ye Qin | |
| 2005 | The Color of Life | 生命的颜色 | Yan Ni | |
| 2006 | Stories of a Taxation Bureau | 税务所的故事 | | |
| 2006 | Sombre Night | 夜深沉 | Yuerong | |
| 2006 | Chinese Story | 中國故事 | Lü Lin | |
| 2007 | Nanny | 保姆 | Ma Xiaohui | |
| 2007 | Chuncao | 春草 | Chuncao | |
| 2007 | The Brothers | 亲兄热弟 | Jin Feng | |
| 2007 | Special Policewomen | 非常女警 | Su Wanqing | |
| 2007 | The Olympic Adventures of Fuwa | 福娃奥运漫游记 | Beibei | voice acting |
| 2008 | Century-Old House | 百年老宅 | Guihua | |
| 2010 | Nanny and Security | 保姆与保安 | Chang Zhao | |
| 2010 | Mother-To-Be Quartet | 准妈妈四重奏 | Pan Xiaoyan | |
| 2011 | Forever Loyal | 永远的忠诚 | Wang Xiaoqin | |
| 2011 | My Father is a Bench | 我的父親是板凳 | Tang Xuemei | |
| 2012 | The Couple Buying a House | 买房夫妻 | Wen Hongqi | |
| 2014 | The Red | 紅色 | Tian Dan | |
| 2015 | Scholars of Tumultuous Times | 亂世書香 | Niu Lan | |
| 2019 | A Little Reunion | 小欢喜 | Song Qian | |
| 2021 | Minning Town | 闽宁镇 | Fu ma | |
| 2021 | The Priceless | 婆婆的镯子 | Mrs. Ning | |

== Acting Awards and Nominations ==
| Year | # | Award | Category | Work | Result |
Film
| 1997 | 10th | Damascus International Film Festival | Best Actress | Colors of the Blind | Won |
| 1998 | 4th | Huabiao Awards | Outstanding Actress | Colors of the Blind | Co-winner |
| 1998 | 18th | Golden Rooster Awards | Best Actress | Colors of the Blind | Won |
| 1999 | 6th | Beijing College Student Film Festival | Best Actress | A Beautiful New World | Won |
| 2000 | 2nd | Deauville Asian Film Festival | Best Actress | Colors of the Blind | Won |
| 2000 | 23rd | Hundred Flowers Awards | Best Supporting Actress | Agreed Not to Separate | Won |
| 2003 | 24th | Little Hundred Flowers Awards | Best Supporting Actress | No Lonely Angels | Won |
| 2006 | 6th | China Movie Channel Lily Awards | Outstanding Actress | Mystery | Co-winner |
| 2009 | 2nd | BTV Star Performer Grand Ceremony | Favourite Film Actress | Marriage Trap | Won |
| 2013 | 17th | Chunyan Awards | Best Supporting Actress | Yang Shanzhou | Won |
| 2014 | 32nd | Hundred Flowers Awards | Best Supporting Actress | Lost in Thailand | Nominated |
| 2014 | 11th | China Movie Channel Media Awards | Best Actress | Forgetting to Know You | Won |
| 2015 | 6th | Youth Film Handbook Awards | Best Actress | Forgetting to Know You | Won |
| 2015 | 22nd | Beijing College Student Film Festival | Best Actress | Forgetting to Know You | Co-winner |
| 2015 | 6th | China Film Director's Guild Awards | Best Actress | Forgetting to Know You | Nominated |
TV Dramas
| 2002 | 22nd | Flying Apsaras Awards | Outstanding Actress | Nothing in the Mirror | Co-winner |
| 2002 | 20th | China TV Golden Eagle Awards | Audience's Choice for Actress | Nothing in the Mirror | Won |
| 2006 | 2nd | Chinese TV Drama Award | Best Supporting Actress | The Emperor in Han Dynasty | Won |
| 2009 | 29th | Flying Apsaras Awards | Outstanding Actress | Chuncao | Nominated |
| 2019 | 26th | Huading Awards | Best Supporting Actress | A Little Reunion | Won |
| 2019 | 4th | Golden Bud - The Network Film And Television Festival | Best Actress | A Little Reunion | Nominated |
| 2019 | | Film and TV Role Model 2019 Ranking | Best Supporting Actress | A Little Reunion | Won |
| 2019 | | Jinri Toutiao Awards Ceremony | Capable Actress of the Year | A Little Reunion | Won |
| 2020 | 26th | Shanghai Television Festival | Best Supporting Actress | A Little Reunion | Won |
| 2020 | 30th | China TV Golden Eagle Award | Best Actress | A Little Reunion | Nominated |
| 2020 | 7th | The Actors of China Awards | Best Actress (Sapphire) | A Little Reunion | Nominated |

== Personal life ==
Tao Hong married actor Xu Zheng in 2002. They first met and became friends in 1999 while co-starring in the wacky romance TV series Sunny Piggy. They have portrayed a married couple in 2 films, Unfinished Girl (2007) and Xu's directorial debut Lost in Thailand (2012). They have also collaborated in the 2002 TV series Sky Lovers (Segment 5, "Sun Tanning") and 2 films in which they did not appear in the same scene: No Lonely Angels (2002) and No Man's Land (2013). In 2005, they starred in the Chinese adaptation of the Broadway comedy Last of the Red Hot Lovers, with Xu playing the would-be adulterer and Tao playing all 3 seductresses. First staged in Beijing, the play caused a sensation, and the couple subsequently performed the play over 30 times in 10 major cities like Shanghai, Chengdu, Nanjing, Xi'an, Zhengzhou, Shenzhen, and Chongqing, receiving overwhelming support everywhere that they canceled their holiday travel plans for more performances. At each city they performed some jokes in the local dialect.

Their daughter was born on 30 December 2008 in Beijing.
