= Clare Ezeakacha =

Nigerian actress, filmmaker, broadcaster, and child advocate

- Born: Clare Chinagorom Ezeakacha; May 26, 1986 (age 40); Lagos, Nigeria
- Education: Madonna University, Elele; University of Nigeria Nsukka
- Occupations: film producer, director, Actress, Broadcaster, Child Advocate
- Years active: 2016–present
- Known for: Smoke and Arima
- Notable work: Smoke, Arima, Gone Grey

Clare Ezeakacha // (born May 26, 1985) is a Nigerian Actress, producer, Nigerian film director, broadcaster and child advocate known for her films Arima and Gone Grey.

== Early life ==
Clare Ezeakacha was born in Lagos but hails from Anambra State, Nigeria. She went to Charles Heery Memorial Junior and Secondary for her lower education. Ezeakacha holds a BSc in Computer Science from Madonna University, Elele and Postgraduate diploma from the University of Nigeria Nsukka.

== Career ==
Clare began her career in 2011 as an on- air personality. In 2016, she delved into film-making and she had produced and directed several nollywood films, including: "Jack of All Trade", "Two Wrongs", "Arima" and " Smoke" which was nominated for Best Short Competition at the 2018 Africa International Film Festival.

== Selected filmography (as director) ==
- Smoke (2018)
- Arima (2017)
- Ordinary Fellow (2018) (assistant director)

== Selected filmography (as producer) ==
- Gone Grey (2016)
- Arima (2017)
- The Employee (2017)
- Mystified (2017) (associate producer)
- JOAT, Jack of All Trade (2017)
- Two Wrongs (2019)
- Friends Only (2020)

== Award ==
Year	Award	Category	Film	Result
2018	Africa International Film Festival	Best Short	Smoke	Nominated

== See also ==
- List of Nigerian film producers
