= List of Douyin original programming =

Douyin, also known as TikTok internationally, is a Chinese short video platform owned by ByteDance. Unlike TikTok, Douyin in China also allow users to upload longer form video, including original programs, starting in 2019.

== Variety ==
Title	Genre	Premiere	Co-network	Seasons	Length	Status
Show You My New Identity	Reality	November 20, 2021	HBS	2 seasons	30 min.	Ongoing
Cheers for Talent	Talent show	October 31, 2021	Jiangsu TV	1 season	80 min.	Ended
Cheers for Song	Music	March 13, 2021	Zhejiang TV	1 season	90 min.	Ended
Snow Season of Teenager	Reality/vertical	December 21, 2020	-	60 episodes	5 - 6 min.	Ended
Infinite Idol	Music	November 22, 2020	-	1 season	-	Ended
Nice to Meet You	Reality	August 22, 2020	-	2 season	120 min.	Ongoing
REKNOW	Reality/vertical	November 28, 2019	-	13 episodes	4 - 10 min.	Ended
MrMossie	Short documentary	November 21, 2019	-	3 episodes	6-13 min.	Ended
Chole's Journeys	Documentary	October 18, 2019	-	10 episodes	10 - 14 min.	Ended
Wish you like it	Music live/vertical	August 28, 2019	-	5 episodes	5 min.	Ended
Every Me	Interview/vertical	June 28, 2019	-	8 episodes	5 min.	Ended

== Short drama ==
Title	Genre	Premiere	Season	Length	Status
1 VS. 100 DREAMBOYS	Romance/comedy/vertical	January 31, 2021	18 episodes	4 - 7 min.	Ended
Nanxiang School	Teen drama/vertical	March 20, 2021	35 episodes	2 - 3 min.	Ended

== Exclusive ==
=== Movie ===
Title	Genre	Premiere	runtime
Lost in Russia	Family, drama	January 25, 2020	126 min.
