= Lost in Thailand =

- Official poster
- Chinese: 人再囧途之泰囧
- Hanyu Pinyin: Rén Zài Jiǒng Tú zhī Tài Jiŏng
- Directed by: Xu Zheng
- Written by: Xu Zheng; Shu Huan; Ding Ding
- Produced by: Xu Zheng; Kwong Man Wai; Chan Chi Leung; Chen Zhixi; Xu Lin
- Starring: Xu Zheng; Wang Baoqiang; Huang Bo; Fan Bingbing; Tao Hong
- Cinematography: Song Xiaofei
- Edited by: Tu Yiran
- Music by: Zhao Yingjun; Deng Ouge; Howie B
- Production companies: Beijing Enlight Pictures; YYT Media; Luck Road Culture Communication; Huang Bo Studio
- Release date: December 12, 2012
- Running time: 105 minutes
- Country: China
- Language: Mandarin
- Budget: US$4.6 million
- Box office: US$208 million (China)

Lost in Thailand is a 2012 Chinese comedy film directed and co-written by Xu Zheng and starring Xu Zheng, Wang Baoqiang, and Huang Bo. The film is about three Chinese men traveling in Thailand: two competing scientists searching for their boss, and a tourist eager to explore the country. The film is Xu's directorial debut.

According to Du and colleagues, within the first week, the film’s box office revenue reached ¥310 million RMB and set the first week box office record for Chinese cinema. As of January 27, 2013, the film had collected ¥1.3 billion RMB in Mainland China with over 39 million moviegoers. This elevated it to the highest-grossing Chinese-language film in China’s history at that time.

== Plot ==
The story begins with a scientist, Xu Lang, who invented a solution (youba, lit. Oil Master, translated as "Supergas") which has the power of increasing the volume of any liquid to which the solution is applied. Such a solution implies great potential profitability if applied to gasoline or any precious liquid. However, he needs the authorization of Mr. Zhou, the biggest shareholder, in order to get further funding from an investment fund. Gao Bo, who was the classmate of Xu in college and his partner at the workplace, wants to sell the invention to a French company instead.

Upon the discovery that Mr. Zhou is in Thailand, Xu Lang immediately embarks on a trip to Thailand, constantly tailed by Gao. On the plane, Xu meets a young man named Wang Bao, who is going to Thailand to fulfill a list of dreams (including fighting a Muay Thai master, planting a cactus). Wang owns a scallion pancake store in Beijing, and claims that the famous actress Fan Bingbing is his girlfriend. Not wanting to be bothered by Wang, Xu keeps trying to get rid of him, but events unfold in such a way that the two become a team.

The two go on a hunt to find Mr. Zhou. The interaction between the savvy businessman and the pious, simple-minded chef is a source of most of the dialog in the film. The two undergo major culture shock in Thailand, while Wang is frustrated with the progress in finding Mr. Zhou.

Attempting to blame Wang for the whole mishap, Xu finds cash in Wang's wallet. Considering that Wang lost all his money earlier in the trip, Xu Lang suspects that he is a spy for Gao and tears apart Wang Bao's diary. Xu goes on to read Wang's diary and discovers that Wang is writing tourist diaries attempting to cheer up his mother, who has Alzheimer's disease, is a fan of actress Fan Bingbing, and wishes that Wang was in a relationship. Moved by Wang's diaries, Xu regains his trust for Wang.

Finally finding the temple where Mr. Zhou is supposed to be located, Wang encounters a Buddhist layman who brings a case that contains the authorization letter. The layman goes on to say that Mr. Zhou has indicated that it is up to them what they want to do with the letter. Gao shows up with a Muay Thai master (Saichia Wongwirot) and starts fighting to gain control of the case. Gao and Xu go on to fight frantically for the case, while Wang is overpowered by the Muay Thai master. Xu lets go of the letter and ultimately decides to fulfill Wang's wish of taking a picture of defeating a Thai boxer instead. Xu comes over and lies down and serves as his takeoff board. Stepping on Xu's chest, Wang flies up into the sky and defeats the Muay Thai master with a massive kick to the head.

Upon reading the letter, Gao goes on to find out that they need to cosign the authorization letter to validate it. At this point, Xu discovers that he does not care about the letter anymore, and he feels guilty for not having given enough attention to his wife and daughter. Through the trip, Xu goes through a metamorphosis from a callous, manipulative businessman to an epiphany of what is really important in life. Wang, on the other hand, inadvertently fulfills every single one of his dreams during the trip to Thailand.

Towards the end, Xu reunites with his wife and brings the family back from the brink of divorce. Wang actually meets with the real Fan Bingbing through Xu's arrangement. Fan is moved by Wang's love for his mother and agrees to take pictures with Wang inside a studio. Gao, still trapped in Thailand due to the loss of his passport which was stolen by Wang earlier, is happy to hear his wife giving birth to their baby over the phone. The story ends on a positive note.

== Cast ==
- Xu Zheng as scientific researcher Xu Lang (徐朗), invented a solution named “youba”(油霸).
- Wang Baoqiang as Wang Bao (王宝), who owns a scallion pancake store in Beijing, is going to Thailand to fulfill a list of dreams.
- Huang Bo as Gao Bo (高博), a classmate of Xu in college and partner of Xu at the workplace, wants to sell “youba” to a French company.
- Tao Hong as An An (安安), Xu Lang’s Wife.
- Fan Bingbing as herself, famous actress, Wang Bao’s secret crush, is invited to go on a honeymoon with Wang Bao.
- Xie Nan as Xu Lang’s secretary.

== Production ==
Lost in Thailand, as a low-budget film, has won many awards and nominations which makes it one of the most successful Chinese films ever. Around 2012, the Chinese film industry was still in its initial stage of commercialization, many film positioning was still immature. In an interview with Cheung Kong Graduate School of Business, the film producer, Chen Zhixi, noted that the film was canceled twice due to financial issues. Investors were worried about the uncertainty of Xu Zheng’s directorial debut. Chen Zhixi still had faith in Xu Zheng and Wang Baoqiang as actors. In the end, Lost in Thailand was able to generate 1.26 billion RMB at the Chinese box-office. There are three factors that contribute to the success of the film: precise positioning, diversified marketing strategies, and lastly reasonable scheduling of the film release.

Xu Zheng, the director of Lost in Thailand, said the film's success was related to the aspirations and anxieties of ordinary Chinese in a time of high growth and dislocation. He also said that "Lost in Thailand" succeeded by showing a rarely seen subject: modern Chinese life. He thought the reason why the movie rocked was that there was hunger from the audience for movies that talk about the real-life situation in China and there was a lack of films that talk about things that were related to the life of ordinary people.

The film features numerous Thai pleasures, including its historical monuments such as temples, elephant rides, resort lodgings, and particularly the outlandish marvel of "lady boys", youthful transgender men who engage customers professionally.

=== Filming ===
Lost in Thailand was predominantly filmed on location in and around the northern city of Chiang Mai. The market stall chase scene was filmed in Talat Warorot while many nature oriented scenes were filmed at Chiang Mai University. Additional scenes were also filmed in Bangkok and Beijing.

=== Precise Positioning ===
The film meets the audience’s needs and interests. In the research phase, Xu Zheng set a popular genre and theme for the film. Director Xu Zheng wanted to make the film as close to people’s lives as possible and make it acceptable for most Chinese audiences.

=== Diversified Marketing Strategies ===
Two months before the film was released, Beijing Enlight Pictures had already started marketing activities. The production company released more than 30 posters, 40 video clips, and over a hundred images relating to the film. Xu Zheng and Wang Baoqiang also spoke on different social media platforms to help increase film exposure. Moreover, the crews went to entertainment shows and press conferences to advertise the film.

=== Reasonable Scheduling ===
With only a 30 million RMB budget, the film was not as competitive as others in the industry during 2012. However, the production company was able to sense the appropriate timing for the release. They released the film three weeks after Life of Pi and two weeks after 1952 and The Last Supper. Therefore, there was a time gap for Lost in Thailand to attract the audience. Additionally, it was near Christmas and New Year's Day, the genre and content of the film matched the audience’s expectations and the atmosphere of the holidays, which formed a strong craze in the public.

== Music ==
The theme song in Mandarin is “Wo Jiu Yao He Ni Zai Yi Qi” (我就要和你在一起), also called “Tai Guo Chuan Qi”(泰国传奇), is written by Zhao Ying-Jun, and performed by Zhao Yingjun and Xia Yunyan.

No.	Title	Lyrics	Music	Singer(s)	Length
1.	"Wo Jiu Yao He Ni Zai Yi Qi (我就要和你在一起)" (theme song)	Zhao Yingjun	Zhao Yingjun	Zhao Yingjun, Xia Yunyan	04：07

== Release ==
=== Box office ===
The film premiered on December 12, 2012. On January 1, 2013, the film crossed over the 1 billion yuan mark, the first Chinese film to do so. It had previously beat James Cameron's 3D re-issue of Titanic which grossed RMB975 million and previous Chinese record holder Painted Skin: The Resurrection which had grossed RMB727 million. Cameron's Avatar still holds the record as China's highest-grossing film, with RMB1.39 billion (US$223 million) on release in 2010 but Lost in Thailand has already overtaken the 3D film by number of tickets sold.

According to Wall Street Journal, "The film’s success has shaken up the landscape of the movie industry in China, where big-budget historical epics and martial arts and action films often dominate the box office."

=== Critical Receptions ===
Variety wrote that the film is "lightweight entertainment" and "is no masterpiece, but has proven a refreshing antidote to the year-end glut of blockbusters" and it is "unexpectedly well honed for a debut feature."

Derek Elley of Film Business Asia gave the film an 8 out 10, and states "The chemistry between leads Xu Zheng and Wang Baoqiang that made Lost on Journey (2010) one of the most delightful sleeper hits of its year survives happily intact in Lost in Thailand", and "Thailand is in every way a much more commercial package. There's less depth to the new characters, the humor is more overstated and less grounded in reality, and overall the movie packs less of an emotional punch in its latter stages; but it's more slickly tooled and less digressive in its construction, halting on its path only briefly to review the plot and the central relationship."

According to an article published by Cheung Kong Graduate School of Business(CKGSB), Li Yang, a CKGSB professor, commented that the adoption of an innovative business model, collaborative creative process, as well as the use of social media and non-conventional advertising methods, played a significant part in the overnight success of the film.

Kong Rithdee of Bangkok Post commented that“[t]he film is perhaps a more effective tourism poster for Thailand than our official campaigns; the mix of beauty and quirk is just right, almost bland, certainly not offensive or critical. A sequel is in the pipeline _ it's win-win, at least for now.”

Darrell argued that Lost in Thailand and other low-budget comedies were aimed at young people; in this regard, as well as in terms of concept and execution, they mark an about-face from earlier dapian (big movie) and their emergence signals exhaustion of the dapian formula in his article from Modern Chinese Literature and Culture.

=== Accolades ===
List of Accolades
Award / Film Festival	Category	Recipient(s)	Result
13th Chinese Film Media Awards	Audience Award for Outstanding Picture	Lost in Thailand	Won
13th Chinese Film Media Awards	Media Tribute Award - Film of the Year	Lost in Thailand	Nominated
13th Chinese Film Media Awards	Media Tribute Award - Actor of the Year	Xu Zheng	Nominated
7th Asian Film Awards	The Asian Film Award for 2012’s Top-Grossing Asian Film	Lost in Thailand	Won
20th Beijing College Student Film Festival	Favorite Director	Xu Zheng	Won
15th China Huabiao Film Awards	Outstanding Youth Filmmaking	Lost in Thailand	Nominated
15th China Huabiao Film Awards	Outstanding New Director	Xu Zheng	Won
32nd Hundred Flowers Awards	Best Actor	Xu Zheng	Nominated
32nd Hundred Flowers Awards	Best Supporting Actress	Tao Hong	Nominated
33rd Hong Kong Film Awards	Best Film from Mainland and Taiwan	Lost in Thailand	Nominated

== Effect on Thailand ==
=== Tourism ===
The film was so popular that scholars such as Du and colleagues, Rattanaphinachai & Rittichainuwat, and Mostafanezhad & Promburom all found it to have a substantial impact on Thailand’s tourism industry, the country’s largest source of foreign income. The number of foreign tourists in the country in 2012 increased 16.8% from 2011 including 2.8 million tourists from mainland China. In 2013, after the film’s release in December 2012, the number of such visitors exceeded 4.7 million, up 68.7% from the previous year.

This impact on tourism was so significant that much of Chiang Mai’s tourist locations adapted to the influx of Chinese tourists. Chiang Mai’s European-inspired attractions and comforts were replaced with accommodations more fit for Chinese tourists. Restaurants started to include Mandarin Chinese in their menus and a variety of Chinese-language guided tours grew more common.

== Lawsuit ==
The film bears a similar name to Lost on Journey in Chinese, and shares the same lead actors. It is, however, not a direct sequel to the 2010 movie as the two movies are produced by different companies and have different directors. In March 2013, Wuhan Huaqi Media, the production company for Lost on Journey, filed a lawsuit against the four companies involved in Lost in Thailand before Beijing High People's Court claiming that the production and release of Lost in Thailand involves copyright infringement and unfair competition by exploiting the success of Lost on Journey without its producer's authorization. The court ruled against Lost in Thailand and ordered Beijing Enlight Pictures to cease all unfair practices and pay Huaqi RMB 85 million in damages.

== See also ==
Lost in Russia follows in the footsteps of comedy mega-hits Lost in Thailand (2012) and Lost in Hong Kong (2015), which became the number one and two highest-grossing films of all time in China at the time of their respective release, with a combined take of $463 million.

The franchise combines the classic road movie with a fish-out-of-water slapstick comedy. The sequel centered on a forgotten past romance and the visual style and various set pieces were packed with references to classic Hong Kong films from the 1980s and 90s. Part of Lost in Russia's Chinese title roughly translates to "Awkward Mom". And the story centers on "family relationships."

- Lost on Journey (2010), directed by Raymond Yip, also starring Xu and Wang
- Lost in Hong Kong (2015), directed by Xu Zheng, starring Xu and Bao Bei'er
- Lost in Russia (2020), directed by Xu Zheng, starring Xu, Huang MeiYing and Yuan Quan
