= Colors of the Blind =

- official film poster
- Chinese: 黑眼睛
- Literal meaning: Black Eyes
- Hanyu Pinyin: Hēi Yǎnjīng
- Directed by: Chen Guoxing
- Written by: Wan Fang
- Produced by: Chen Guoxing; Jiang Huaiyan; Lu Yao; Han Hongfei
- Starring: Tao Hong; Jiang Kai; He Bing
- Cinematography: Liang Ming; Wen Deguang
- Music by: Zhao Jiping
- Production companies: Tianjin Film Studio; Beijing Film Studio
- Release date: 1997
- Running time: 89 minutes
- Country: China
- Language: Mandarin

Colors of the Blind is a 1997 Chinese drama film directed and co-produced by Chen Guoxing, starring Tao Hong as a blind girl training to become a competitive sprinter. The script was written by Wan Fang.

At the time of filming, Tao Hong was a third-year student at the Central Academy of Drama, acting in her second film role. She was chosen for the lead role mainly because of her athletic background, as she had been a professional synchronised swimmer for 10 years. To prepare for the film, Tao also spent time among disabled people. Her performance in this film won her some of the highest honors in China, as well as awards in Syria and France.

A number of real-life Chinese Paralympians appeared in small roles, such as Wang Juan.

== Plot ==
If not for attending a school for the blind, Ding Lihua (Tao Hong) is just like any other young, silly girl. The chirping of canary or the touch of snow will bring out a big smile from her. She hates it, however, when people mention her disability especially out of sympathy, and when her brother (Zhang Wankun) and sister-in-law (Ding Jiali) try to matchmake her with an older blind musician, she takes offense. One day, running after her brother's bicycle on the rural road, Ding is spotted by Li Mingsheng (Jiang Kai), a dedicated Paralympic coach who trains a group of disabled track athletes. Ding joins his team, though she quits not long after due to a disagreement with his harsh training method.

Realizing that running under Li is her best bet to become something, she returns to the team, and Li quickly sees the potential and the competitive spirit in her. They train hard and Ding wins the 100-metre dash in her first official competition. Ding develops feelings for Li, even though she is also aware that he is fully healthy with a beautiful girlfriend Yu Su (Cui Qianmei). Around this time, Liu Yi (He Bing), a rich ex-classmate, visits her frequently with the intention of dating her. Though not interested in him, Ding borrows money from Liu to try to help Li mend his failing relationship with Yu, but Li and Yu still break up for good. Li thanks Ding, but rejects her love. Ding becomes sullen, and leaves the team again after an argument with Li. Li gains more understanding of blind people that they wish to be treated normally more than they need sympathy, while Ding also realizes that she needs to accept the reality that she is blind and different from others.

After winning a gold medal at a Paralympic Games for China, Ding returns home and becomes a masseuse. It is through sports that she becomes a confident human being, and she begins to see colors in her dreams.

== Awards and nominations ==
- 1997 10th Damascus International Film Festival
  - Won — Best Actress (Tao Hong)
- 1998 4th Huabiao Awards
  - Won — Top-10 Films
  - Won — Outstanding Actress (Tao Hong)
- 1998 18th Golden Rooster Awards
  - Won — Best Actress (Tao Hong)
- 2000 2nd Deauville Asian Film Festival
  - Won — Best Actress (Tao Hong)
