= Lost in Hong Kong =

- poster
- Chinese: 港囧
- Hanyu Pinyin: Gǎng Jiǒng
- Jyutping: Gong^{2} Gwing^{2}
- Directed by: Xu Zheng
- Written by: Xu Zheng; Shu Huan; Su Liang; Xing Aina; Zhao Yingjun
- Produced by: Xu Zheng; Chan Chi-leung
- Starring: Xu Zheng; Zhao Wei; Bao Bei'er; Du Juan
- Cinematography: Song Xiaofei
- Edited by: Tu Yiran
- Music by: Peng Fei
- Production companies: Beijing Enlight Pictures; Luck Road Culture Communication; Pulin Production
- Release date: September 25, 2015
- Running time: 114 minutes
- Country: China
- Language: Mandarin
- Budget: US$15.6 million
- Box office: US$256 million

Lost in Hong Kong is a 2015 Chinese comedy film directed, co-written and co-produced by Xu Zheng, starring himself along with Zhao Wei, Bao Bei'er, and Du Juan. This is Xu's second directorial feature, after the huge domestic hit Lost in Thailand (2012) which grossed over US$208 million. A third film in the "Lost in" series, Lost in Russia was released in 2020, although all three films' plot and characters are unrelated.

It was released in Mainland China on September 25, 2015, and broke several national box office records. It was released in Hong Kong and Macau on November 19.

== Plot ==
In the mid-1990s, university art majors Xu Lai (Xu Zheng) and Yang Yi (Du Juan) fell in love, but then Yang was transferred to the Chinese University of Hong Kong and Xu has never seen her since. Almost twenty years later, the already bald Xu has long forgotten his dreams of becoming an artist, but he can never forget Yang even though he enjoys a comfortable life with his loving wife Cai Bo (Zhao Wei), the only major problem between them being the repeated failure conceiving a child. During a vacation in Hong Kong with Cai's overbearing family, Xu plans to secretly visit Yang, but Cai Bo's goofy young brother Cai Lala (Bao Bei'er) — always carrying a video camera in hand for his documentary project — tags along like his unwelcome shadow to spoil the rendezvous. Meanwhile, in Hong Kong, Wong Jing is filming another riotous gangster movie, while 2 police officers (Sam Lee and Eric Kot) investigate a murder. One of them attempts to topple the case and threatens Xu Lai's near and dear.

== Cast ==
- Xu Zheng as Xu Lai, a man facing midlife crisis
- Zhao Wei as "Spinach" a.k.a. Cai Bo, Xu Lai's wife
- Bao Bei'er as Cai Lala, Cai Bo's brother
- Du Juan as Yang Yi, Xu Lai's first love
- Sam Lee as Tai Pak Ho, Hong Kong cop
- Eric Kot as senior Hong Kong cop
- Pan Hong as Pan Tongtong, Cai Bo's mother
- Zhao Youliang as Cai Youliang, Cai Bo's father
- Zhu Yuanyuan as Cai Bo's sister
- Wang Xun as Cai Bo's brother-in-law
- Cheng Lei as host of class reunion (cameo)
- Fung Min-hun as waiter (cameo)
- Yuen Ngai-hung as taxi driver (cameo)
- Wong Jing as himself (cameo)
- Jerry Lamb as Wong Jing's assistant (cameo)
- Bobby Yip as Kam, Wong Jing's stunt coordinator (cameo)
- Che Biu-law as locksmith expert (cameo)
- Kingdom Yuen as "Momoko", brothel madam (cameo)
- Velaris Mitchell as big guy in brothel
- Singh Hartihan Bitto & Peagu Alexandru as 2 Mexicans in brothel
- Lam Suet as triad boss (cameo)
- Kong Yeuk-sing as taxi driver (cameo)
- Lawrence Cheng as host of art exhibition (cameo)
- Tin Kai-man as operator of remote control plane (cameo)
- Richard Ng as man in lift (cameo)
- Jim Chim as Dr. Chan Chi Wo, sperm-harvesting acupuncturist (cameo)
- Jacqueline Chong as Yang Yi's assistant
- Tao Hong as Hong Kong Film Award presenter (cameo)

== Hong Kong films referenced ==
The film makes explicit or implicit references to well-known Hong Kong films such as:

- Police Story (1985)
- From Beijing with Love (1994)
- Chungking Express (1994)
- C'est la vie, mon chéri (1994)
- A Chinese Odyssey (1995)
- Comrades: Almost a Love Story (1996)
- City of Glass (1998)
- 2046 (2004)
- Kung Fu Hustle (2004)

Moreover, most insert songs also reference Hong Kong films and TV series popular in mainland China (see below).

== Soundtrack ==
- The end theme song in Mandarin is "Qing Feng Xu Lai" (清风徐来, The Breeze Cand Slowly), written by Zhao Yingjun, sung by China's pop diva Faye Wong who had a remarkable career in Hong Kong. This is Wong's only recording in 2015. The song title, taken from Su Shi's 1082 masterpiece Qian Chibi Fu (前赤壁賦; Former Ode on the Red Cliffs), can be translated as "the breeze blows gently". In this case, the title can also be interpreted as "Xu Lai the Breeze", a reference of the protagonist's name.
- The film also features a number of Cantopop hits from 1980s and 1990s Hong Kong, summarised below:

Song	Singer	Music	Lyrics	Notes
"Pin Pin Hei Foon Nei" (偏偏喜歡你; "I Just Only Like You")	Danny Chan		Cheng Kwok-kong	title track of Chan's 1983 album
"Seoi Ho Goi Bin" (誰可改變; "Who Is Able to Change")	Alan Tam	Joseph Koo	Cheng Kwok-kong	theme song of The Fearless Duo (1984) included in Tam's 1984 album Roots of Love (愛的根源)
"Wai Nei Zung Cing" (為你鍾情; "For Your Heart Only")	Leslie Cheung	Wong Ching-yue	James Wong	theme song of For Your Heart Only (1985) title track of Cheung's 1985 album
"Ngo Long Cyun Syut" (餓狼傳說; "Legend of a Hungry Wolf")	Jacky Cheung	John Laudon	Poon Wai-yuen	title track of Cheung's 1994 album
"Zan Dik Hon Zi" (真的漢子; "Real Man")	George Lam		Cheng Kwok-kong	theme song of And Yet We Live (1988) included in Lam's 1988 album Song of Life (生命之曲)
"Cong Hoi Jat Sing Siu" (滄海一聲笑; "A Sound of Laughter in the Vast Sea")	Samuel Hui	James Wong		theme song of The Swordsman (1990)
"Mong Cing Sam Baa Mou" (忘情森巴舞; "Blame It on the Samba")	Grasshopper	Volker Barber	Chow Lei-mau	title track of Grasshopper's 1991 album
"Jat Saang So Oi" (一生所愛; "The Love of My Life")	Lowell Lo		Susan Tong	theme song of A Chinese Odyssey (1995)
"Soeng Hoi Taan" (上海灘; "The Bund")	Frances Yip	Joseph Koo	James Wong	theme song of The Bund (1980) title track of Yip's 1980 album
"Sin Neoi Jau Wan" (倩女幽魂; "A Chinese Ghost Story")	Leslie Cheung	James Wong		theme song of A Chinese Ghost Story (1987) included in Cheung's 1987 album Summer Romance
"Cing Jan" (情人; "Lovers")	Beyond	Wong Ka Kui	Lau Cheuk-fai	included in Beyond's 1993 album Rock and Roll theme song of The Tragic Fantasy - Tiger of Wanchai (1994)
"Maan Lei Coeng Sing Wing Bat Dou" (萬里長城永不倒; "The Great Wall Will Never Fall")	Johnny Yip	Lai Siu-tin	Lo Kwok-chim	theme song of The Legendary Fok (1981) included in Yip's 1981 album The Legendary Fok

== Reception ==
=== Box office ===
Buoyed by growing anticipation from fans, minor competition and the ever-growing expansion of the Chinese movie industry, Lost in Hong Kong is projected to be a box office success. It made more than half of what its immediate predecessor earned in its entire lifetime in just three days. Critics noted that the film will no doubt surpass its predecessor's US$208 million gross. It had a worldwide opening of US$106.8 million, which is the second biggest of all time for a comedy film behind The Hangover Part II (US$177.8 million) in 2011, and the biggest for a non-English language film. Its worldwide opening was also the biggest of its release weekend (ahead of Hotel Transylvania 2). Although the film didn't face any serious competition with its fellow new releases during its opening weekend, it started facing competition from new releases—Saving Mr. Wu, Goodbye Mr. Loser, and Chronicles of the Ghostly Tribe—on September 30, 2015, albeit none of them were able to outgross the former.

In China, it made $1.8 million from midnight screenings and $32 million on its opening day on Friday, September 25, 2015, which is the biggest debut ever for a Chinese film and the third biggest debut overall in China behind Furious 7 and Avengers: Age of Ultron. It debuted with an unprecedented 100,000+ first-day screenings on nearly 20,000 screens—and surpassed all newcomers by occupying 87% share of the day's box office receipts. It earned US$70.6 million in two days. During its opening weekend it grossed an estimated US$106.8 million from a massive 284,000 screenings in three days becoming the second Chinese film after Monster Hunt to open with more than US$100 million. Its 3-day haul of US$106 million is also the second biggest 3-day gross of any film in China irrespective of any day. Only Furious 7, which debuted to US$121 million in its Sunday-Tuesday opening in April, has ever notched a bigger 3-day opening in China. It topped the Chinese box office for the second weekend earning US$41 million. It was then the second highest-grossing Chinese film of all time behind Monster Hunt and the third highest-grossing film in China in 2015 behind Monster Hunt and Furious 7.

In the United States and Canada, it opened to a limited release on the same day as its Chinese opening and made $559,000 from 27 theaters—at an average of $20,700 per theater—capturing the weekend's best opening per-theater-average. Well Go USA Entertainment, the distributor of the film in the US said it was "thrilled" with the early results.

=== Critical response ===
The film received a 60% rating from critics on Rotten Tomatoes.

Despite setting many records, the film has also attracted many negative reviews from Chinese critics and a more mixed reaction than its predecessor Lost in Thailand.

Martin Tsai of the Los Angeles Times called the film a "rollicking crowd-pleaser" that "might just be smart and substantive enough to be one of the year's best." On the other hand, Helen T. Verongos of The New York Times was not impressed, labeling it "a very, very, very, long-feeling movie" that "tries too hard to be too many things".

Variety's Maggie Lee considered the film "tamer but still agreeable" compared to Lost in Thailand, noting the comedy's references are particularly tailored to the mainland China market, "which even Hong Kong viewers will miss." She also predicted that "mainlanders in their 40s" will embrace it much more readily compared to "millennials".
