= Your Place or Mine! =

1998 Hong Kong film by James Yuen

- Directed by: James Yuen
- Written by: James Yuen
- Produced by: Wong Jing
- Starring: Tony Leung Chiu-wai; Vivian Hsu; Ada Choi; Alex Fong; Suki Kwan
- Edited by: Marco Mak
- Production company: BoB and Partners Co. Ltd.
- Release date: 25 September 1998
- Running time: 101 minutes
- Country: Hong Kong
- Language: Cantonese

Your Place or Mine! (Chinese: 每天愛你8小時) is a 1998 Hong Kong romantic sex-comedy film written and directed by James Yuen and produced by Wong Jing.

== Plot ==
Cheung is an advertising executive who has dated many women, often with the same talent that he employed. However, they all invariably leave him, the act referred to as "flying away". One day, he becomes captivated with an unknown talent Ah-yu at a photoshoot. After she signs with Cheung's agency, they begin seeing each other. Concurrently, Cheung grows closer to his stern new boss Vivian, who he discovers is dating a married man.

As Ah-yu's career takes off, Cheung agrees to sign her off to a different management agency so that she can expand her career in Japan. Cheung asks his father whether he has been involved with two women at once. His father tells him that regulation football rules does not allow two footballs on the field at the same time. Later, Vivian ends her affair and almost hooks up with Cheung at his apartment. However, Ah-yu unexpectedly returns, confused about being sent to Japan, only to find Cheung and Vivian together. Both women leave as it cuts to his father giving him metaphorical red card.

On the day of Ah-yu's departure, Cheung struggles to decide between both women. He decides to go to the airport and choose there only to be stopped by Vivian. She gives Cheung an ultimatum of marriage, but Cheung declines the offer. At that moment, he realizes that having to do the "flying away" is just as heartbreaking as having to receive it. Cheung reunites with Ah-yu at the airport and offers to fly together with her to Japan.

In the epilogue, Cheung is back in Hong Kong as Ah-yu's popularity grows in Japan. He receives a phone call in French as he insinuates to his father that he's actually a bigger fan of snooker.

== Cast ==
- Tony Leung Chiu-wai as Cheung Suk-Wai — an advertising agency executive who consistently falls in love with his clients but gets dumped once they become popular
- Vivian Hsu as Ah yu — the cheery new model at the agency and Leung's new love interest
- Ada Choi as Vivian — Wai's new strict boss who everyone thinks is a lesbian
- Alex Fong as Patrick — Wai's philandering co-worker and friend
- Suki Kwan as Mei — Patrick's co-worker, longtime friend, and newfound love interest
- Eileen Tung as Patrick's Shanghainese girlfriend
- Spencer Lam as Wai's father

== Production ==
The film was shot in 15 days.

== Release ==
Hong Kong received a Blu-ray and DVD release by CN Entertainment on 24 March 2021.

== Reception ==
Derek Elley for Far East Film Festival likened the film's qualities to productions by the defunct production company United Filmmakers Organization. James Yuen had written several of Peter Chan's films about relationships for the company, such as He's a Woman, She's a Man (1994).

== Awards and nominations ==
Year	Award	Category	Nominee	Result	Notes
1998	35th Golden Horse Awards	Best Feature Film	BoB and Partners Co. Ltd.	Nominated	
1998	35th Golden Horse Awards	Best Leading Actor	Tony Leung Chiu-wai	Nominated	
1998	35th Golden Horse Awards	Best Supporting Actor	Alex Fong	Nominated	
1998	35th Golden Horse Awards	Best Supporting Actress	Suki Kwan	Nominated	
1998	35th Golden Horse Awards	Best Original Screenplay	James Yuen	Nominated	
1999	Hong Kong Film Award	Best Supporting Actor	Alex Fong	Nominated	
