= Breakup Buddies =

2014 film

- Official poster
- Chinese: 心花路放
- Hanyu Pinyin: Xīn Huā Lù Fàng
- Directed by: Ning Hao
- Written by: Yue Xiaojun; Xing Aina; Sun Xiaohang; Dong Runnian; Zhang Disha; Zhang Yifan
- Produced by: Wang Yibing; Ling Hong
- Starring: Huang Bo; Xu Zheng
- Cinematography: Song Xiaofei
- Edited by: Du Yuan
- Music by: Nathan Wang; Dong Dongdong
- Production companies: Injo Films; China Film Group; Beijing Galloping Horse Film; Beijing Asian Union Culture & Media Investment; Talent International Film; Beijing Shine Land Culture; Beijing Injo Production; Beijing HG & Injo Culture Investment Management; Beijing Skywheel Entertainment; Huang Bo Studio; Dongyang Dirty Monkey Films Production; China Movie Channel; Beijing Sankuai Technology
- Release dates: September 7, 2014 (TIFF); September 30, 2014 (China)
- Running time: 116 minutes
- Country: China
- Language: Mandarin
- Box office: US$195,300,000

Breakup Buddies is a 2014 Chinese romantic comedy and road film directed by Ning Hao. It stars Huang Bo and Xu Zheng as buddies on a wild 3,000-kilometre cross-country journey from Beijing to Dali City (via Zhangjiajie).

The film premiered at the 2014 Toronto International Film Festival on September 7, 2014, and was released domestically on September 30, 2014. It grossed over $195 million to become one of the highest-grossing films in China.

== Plot ==
Womanizer Hao Yi (Xu Zheng) takes his best friend Geng Hao (Huang Bo) on a road trip to Dali City in Yunnan — China's unofficial capital of one-night stands — to help him recover from a devastating divorce. Years before, Kang Xiaoyu (Yuan Quan) had traversed the same route to Dali where she met her future husband.

== Cast ==
- Huang Bo as Geng Hao
- Xu Zheng as Hao Yi
- Yuan Quan as Kang Xiaoyu
- Zhou Dongyu as Zhou Lijuan, a.k.a. "Christina"
- Tao Hui as Avatar girl
- Yue Xiaojun as an innkeeper
- Shen Teng as a bar owner
- Zhang Li as a Si Qing
- Jiao Junyan as Xiao Bei
- Ma Su as Shasha
- Liu Meihan
- Xiong Naijin as Kang Xiaoyu's best friend
- Liu Yiwei as a cop
- Wang Yanhui as a crime boss
- Lei Jiayin as a gangster
- Yong Mengting as a cosplay girl
- Liang Hao as Li Maomao, Zhou Lijuan's boyfriend
- Guo Tao as Kang Xiaoyu's attorney (cameo)
- Li Chen as Kang Xiaoyu's new lover (cameo)
- Xia Yu as Kang Xiaoyu's ex (cameo)

== Review ==
Derek Elley of Film Business Asia gave Breakup Buddies a 7 out of 10, calling it "Ning Hao's maturest film so far" and praising the performances as "strong".

== Box office ==
The film grossed ¥1.16971 billion at the Chinese box office and a total of US$195.3 million internationally. The Guardian's Phil Hoad mentioning the film as one of "a few, giant, isolated local hits".
