= Agreed Not to Separate =

1999 film directed by Fu Jingsheng

- Film poster
- Traditional Chinese: 說好不分手
- Simplified Chinese: 说好不分手
- Hanyu Pinyin: Shuōhǎo Bù Fēnshǒu
- Directed by: Fu Jingsheng
- Written by: Fei Ming; Yan Gang; Wang Hailin
- Produced by: Yang Jian; Lu Wenjie
- Starring: Xu Qing; Pu Cunxin; Guo Feng; Tao Hong
- Cinematography: Fu Jingsheng
- Edited by: Feng Sihai; Yang Jian
- Music by: Guo Feng
- Production companies: Shanghai Paradise Film & Television
- Release date: 1999
- Running time: 96 minutes
- Country: China
- Language: Mandarin

Agreed Not to Separate is a 1999 Chinese drama film directed by Fu Jingsheng. This film is Fu's directorial debut.

== Plot ==
Teng Yuanfeng (Pu Cunxin) cannot understand why Lin Qiao (Xu Qing) divorced him and moved into a crowded apartment — by herself, since he won the custody battle. They have always had a loving relationship; sometimes Lin complained about his work and business trips, but nothing suggested a breakup. One day, Lu Xinxin (Tao Hong), who knew Lin as the one-time a cappella singer for her musician husband Zhang Ke (Guo Feng), bumps into Lin and notices the uncanny resemblance between her husband and Lin's son. She begins to follow the child, and later Zhang does the same. This gets the attention of Teng, who also realizes the unthinkable: the son that he has loved and cared for 4 years is not his.

Furious, Teng sues Zhang for homewrecking and neglecting parental responsibilities. He leaves the child with Lin, but does not involve her in the lawsuit as he still loves her. Lin admits to a regrettable affair at a period of extreme loneliness (when Teng was away in Copenhagen covering the UEFA Euro 1992), and tells him that she filed for divorce because she could no longer bear the sight of the child and Teng together. Meanwhile, Zhang gets depressed especially since Lu also leaves him, though she comes back following his failed suicidal attempt. At the hearing, Lin (who is summoned as a witness) tells the court that while not his biological father, Teng has always cared for the child and done everything a father can. Teng gets emotional and drops the lawsuit. Afterwards, Lin calls Teng to tell him that she is leaving for good with the child, and Teng does not say anything. He encounters a lovesick man on the street and realizes that he cannot live without Lin and her son.

== Awards and nominations ==
2000 23rd Hundred Flowers Awards

- Won - Hundred Flowers Award for Best Supporting Actress (Tao Hong)
