= Li Man =

Chinese actress

- Born: June 4, 1988 (age 37); Anshan, Liaoning, China
- Occupation: Actress
- Years active: 2006–present
- Agent(s): H&R Century Pictures

Li Man (Chinese: 李曼, born 4 June 1988) is a Chinese actress. She is best known for her role in Zhang Yimou's 2006 film Curse of the Golden Flower, which boosted her to stardom. She studied at the Central Academy of Drama.

== Filmography ==
=== Film ===
Year	English title	Chinese title	Role	Notes
2006	Curse of the Golden Flower	满城尽带黄金甲	Jiang Chan	
2010	Lost on Journey	人在囧途	Man Ni	
2011	The Winner Takes It All	鬼脸儿杜兴	Lei Sanniang	
2012	The Locked Door	女人如花	Xu Jiao	
2016	A Busy Night	情况不妙		
2017	A Blockbuster Hit	惊天大翻盘	Shi Rong	

=== Television series ===
Year	English title	Chinese title	Role	Notes
2007	Modern Youth	梦幻天堂	Sun Lingyi	
2008	The Shaolin Warriors	少林僧兵	Hideko (Xiuzi)	
2008		美丽的南方	Lin Xiaoxia	
2009	River City Order	江城令	He Li	
2010		孽缘	Wang Mei	
2011	The Legend of the Twelve Chinese Zodiacs	十二生肖傳奇	Xue Ling	
2011	Black Fox	黑狐	Yu Mei	
2012	Palace II	宫锁珠帘	Jingiya Xiuli	
2012	Cherry Color	血色樱花	Shen Ruhua	
2012		博弈	Bi Jiaqi	
2013	Romance of Tang′ Kongfu	唐朝浪漫英雄	Wen Tian'er	
2013	The Colors of Youth	等待绽放	Qin Bing	
2014		血色迷情	Jin Zi	
2014	Moment in Peking	新京华烟云	Niu Suyun	
2014		汉阳造	Jiang Xue	
2014		怒放	Luo Mai	
2016	Don't Go Breaking My Heart	致单身男女	Ma Chunfang	
2016	War and Peace	大世界	Huang Yingyin	
2016	Mom's Love Luck	老妈的桃花运	Shi Ru	
2016	The Spirit of Soldiers	铁血军魂	Shu Juan	
2018	The Destiny of White Snake	天乩之白蛇传说	Xiao Qing	
2019	The Lost Tomb II: Explore with the Note	盗墓笔记II: 怒海潜沙&秦岭神树	A'ning	
2020	Autumn Cicada	秋蝉	He Ying	
TBA		封神之天启	Ling Xiao	
TBA	Son of Hero	惊天岳雷	Xia Yunfei	
TBA	No Marriage	不婚	Tang Ningjie	
