= Lost on Journey =

- Official poster
- Chinese: 人在囧途
- Hanyu Pinyin: Rén Zài Jiǒng Tú
- Directed by: Raymond Yip
- Written by: Tian Yusheng; Shi Chenyun; Xu Yuanfeng
- Screenplay by: Liu Yiwei
- Produced by: Manfred Wong
- Starring: Xu Zheng; Wang Baoqiang; Li Man; Zuo Xiaoqing
- Cinematography: Michael Tsui
- Edited by: Leung Kwok Wing
- Music by: Kay Chan
- Production companies: Wuhan Huaqi Movies & TV Production; Hubei Provincial Film Distribution & Exhibition
- Release date: 4 June 2010
- Running time: 95 minutes
- Country: China
- Language: Mandarin
- Budget: CN¥9.5 million
- Box office: CN¥46.5 million

Lost on Journey is a 2010 Chinese comedy film directed by Raymond Yip and starring Xu Zheng and Wang Baoqiang. This film depicts an amusing yet realistic portrayal of the issues prevalent in the Chinese society, especially during the chaotic Chunyun when everyone wants to reunite with their family for the Chinese New Year celebrations.

The film is superficially similar to John Hughes's 1987 film Planes, Trains and Automobiles in depicting the journey of two mismatched companions.

== Plot ==
Li Chenggong (Xu Zheng) is a wealthy and arrogant businessman who treats his employees poorly and has a secret mistress, Manni (Li Man). Although his mistress wants him to spend Chinese New Year with her in Shijiazhuang, Li feels obligated to return to his hometown Changsha to celebrate Chinese New Year with his wife Meili (Zuo Xiaoqing), daughter, and mother. Arriving at the crowded airport, Li finds he has been mistakenly booked in the economy class and sits next to the first-time flyer Niu Geng (Wang Baoqiang), a naïve and gullible migrant worker who works as a milk extraction technician. Niu is also setting out to Changsha to claim his defaulted wages from "his boss' debtor" with a (questionable) promissory note given to him by his boss.

As Li and Niu’s lives crosses paths, the two embark in a chaotic journey together. The duo experiences a seemingly never-ending streak of bad luck as they try to make their way to Changsha.

After the airplane takes off, the Changsha airport experiences a heavy snowstorm so their flight is cancelled and they are forced to turn back. Li then manages to acquire a train ticket, but once on board, he realizes the ticket he purchased was a counterfeit, which just happens to be the same seat that Niu bought. As some train tracks collapsed due to a landslide, the two leave the train and attempt to take the bus.

When they are about to get on the bus to Changsha, Niu is touched by a female beggar (Zhang Xinyi) and wants to give her money. Li discourages Niu from doing so and calls him an idiot for believing in the lies of the beggar. Li leaves Niu and boards his bus. Li falls asleep and the bus driver wakes him up hours later, informing him the bus has returned to the station due to a broken bridge. Li and Niu meet again, and Niu tells Li he still ends up giving the beggar money, but she does not return.

The closing of a bridge spanning over the Yangtze River causes them to stop at Wuhan where they spot the beggar. The two go on a fanatic chase to pin down the scam artist. The chase leads them into a peaceful complex and Li goes into the room full of children quietly drawing. The beggar is a teacher who took care of these children and needs money to pay for an operation for a blind child. The duo is touched and gives her all their money.

Continuing on their farcical adventure, Niu convinces Li to buy a lottery ticket. To their surprise, they win the first prize, which is a car. They decide to drive the car to Changsha. Suffering from lack of sleep, Li decides to let Niu drive temporarily. However, Niu falls asleep and drives the car into a ditch. The two frantically jumps out of the car in anticipation of an explosion as they often see in movies, but nothing happens. They have a heartfelt conversation as they decide to spend the night in the middle of nowhere.

The next day they are able to hitchhike on a tractor transporting chickens. Finally they reach Changsha covered in chicken feathers. Li is surprised to find out that his mistress is also in the city to give him a surprise.

The trip is a voyage of self-discovery for Li as by the end, he has changed. He has gone from scoffing beggars to believing that honesty still exists in the world; from a cold-blooded boss to a real human being. Finally realizing what is important to him, he breaks up with his mistress and returns to his family. Knowing that Niu will never get his defaulted wage from anyone else, Li secretly provides money to an associate so that Niu is happily paid. Although Niu was not his real creditor, what he owed Niu are the lessons he learned throughout the journey and the epiphanies regarding the importance of honesty and trust.

One year later, Li is boarding a plane and questioning a stewardess why it was not taking off despite being forty minutes overdue, receiving the answer that one last passenger was late. The final passenger arrives just after that and calls out excitedly to Li upon seeing him, revealing himself to be Niu in a suit, who had quit his job after receiving his "wage" and became his own successful boss.

== Cast ==
- Xu Zheng as Li Chenggong
- Wang Baoqiang as Niu Geng
- Li Man as Manni, Li Chenggong's mistress
- Zuo Xiaoqing as Meili, Li Chenggong's wife
- Zhang Xinyi as the beggar
- Huang Xiaolei as woman in hotel room
- Zhang Chao as handsome guy on bus
- Li Xiaolu & Ma Jian as vendors selling counterfeits

== Reception ==
Reviewers were generally complimentary, citing good chemistry between the two leads, and the realistic depiction of modern Chinese society, especially the trials of Spring Festival, although one thought the inconsistencies in the plot were slightly distracting. Another review stated the plot was deeper than the superficial farce of traveling woes in rallying human spirit to overcome an indifferent world.

The film Lost in Thailand directed by Xu Zheng, also starring Xu and Wang, was released in 2012 to great commercial success in China.
