= Sunny Piggy =

Chinese television series

- Also known as: The Sunshine Pigsy
- Traditional Chinese: 春光燦爛豬八戒
- Simplified Chinese: 春光灿烂猪八戒
- Hanyu Pinyin: Chūn Guāng Càn Làn Zhū Bājiè
- Jyutping: Ceon^{1} Gwong^{1} Caan^{3} Laan^{6} Zyu^{1} Baat^{3}-Gaai^{3}
- Written by: Li Tianze
- Directed by: Meng Ji; Ye Chongming
- Starring: Xu Zheng; Tao Hong; Sun Xing; Chen Hong; Yvonne Yung; Lee Li-chun
- Opening theme: "Hao Chun Guang" (好春光) performed by Wu Tong
- Ending theme: "Juan Jie Pan" (卷睫盼) performed by Chen Lin and Wu Tong
- Country of origin: China
- Original language: Mandarin
- No. of episodes: 38

Production
- Producers: Fan Xiaotian; Ma Zhongjun

Sunny Piggy is a 2000 Chinese romantic fantasy comedy-drama television series. It stars Xu Zheng as Zhu Bajie, a foolish pig (and farting machine) who wanted to become human, and Tao Hong as a kindhearted dragon princess who loved him unconditionally until her death. Most characters, including Zhu Bajie, are taken from the 16th-century novel Journey to the West and Chinese mythology.

The series was filmed in 1999 jointly by Jiangsu Television, Zhejiang Television, Sichuan Television and Dragon Television, in conjunction with Suzhou Southern Pai Culture Media, China Federation of Literary and Art Circles Publishing Corporation, and Sky Creation. Copyrights were sold to 13 national television stations, which began broadcasting it almost simultaneously in January 2000.

It achieved ratings over 30% in several provinces, prompting over 20 smaller local stations to show its reruns. Xu Zheng, virtually unknown before the series, rode its popularity to stardom. He and Tao Hong became close friends, and eventually married in 2002.

The show has since spawned several sequels and remakes.

== Cast ==
- Xu Zheng as Zhu Bajie (Pig)
  - Xu Zheng also portrayed Zhu Fengchun, Zhu Bajie's owner whose body Zhu Bajie possessed
- Tao Hong as Xiaolongnü (Dragon Maiden)
- Yvonne Yung as Cat Devil
  - Yvonne Yung also portrayed Miaomiao, a girl whose body Cat Devil possessed
- Chu Chung-heng as Sun Wukong (Monkey)
- Jin Qiaoqiao as Dragon Maiden's sister
- Lee Li-chun as Dragon King of the East Sea
- Chen Hong as Chang'e (Moon Goddess)
- Sun Xing as Taibai Jinxing (Great White Golden Star)
- Wang Bozhao as Jade Emperor
- Dai Chunrong as Xi Wangmu (Queen Mother of the East)
- Liu Xiaofeng as Wu Gang
- Kou Zhanwen as Houyi
- Lin Jifan as Taishang Laojun (Grand Supreme Elderly Lord)
- Xu Zhen as Erlangshen
- Zhu Jingui as Turtle
- Li Zhigui as Yue Lao (Old Man Under the Moon)
- Doze Niu as Dragon King of the North Sea

== International broadcast ==
- China – Beijing Television, Tianjin Television, Shanghai Television, Jiangsu Television, Guangdong Television, Fujian Television, Sichuan Television, Anhui Television, Shanxi Television, Hebei Television, Nei Mongol Television etc. — January/February 2000
- Taiwan - Eastern Television (ETTV Variety) — July 2000
- Hong Kong - Asia Television (ATV Home) — May 2001
- Vietnam - Vĩnh Long Television (THVL) — June 2011

== Sequels and remakes ==
Producer Fan Xiaotian, who became known as the Piggy Godfather, has since produced 4 live-action TV series and a number of animation TV series derived from the series. These include:

- Lucky Piggy (福星高照豬八戒), a 2004 sequel, starring Huang Haibo as Zhu Bajie, also starring Fan Bingbing and Han Xue.
  - Happy Piggy (喜氣洋洋豬八戒), a 2005 sequel to the 2004 series, starring Gao Hongxian as Zhu Bajie
- Sunny Piggy, a 2006 animation remake
  - Sunny Piggy 2, a 2010 sequel, also an anime series
- Sister Sunny Piggy (春光燦爛豬九妹), a 2011 spin-off, starring Joe Chen as Zhu Jiumei (Zhu Bajie's female version)
- The Happy Marshal (春光燦爛之歡樂元帥), a 2012 remake, starring Leo Ku as Zhu Shuaishuaige (essentially the same character as Zhu Bajie), also starring Charlene Choi and Gillian Chung.

However, none of them was nearly as popular or well-received as the original.
