= Moment in Peking (2014 TV series) =

- Starring: Li Sheng; Gao Ziqi; Kan Qingzi; Lee Seung-hyun; Li Man

Production
- Running time: 45 mins per episode

Moment in Peking, sometimes called New Moment in Peking to distinguish it from earlier adaptations, is a 2014 Chinese television series loosely based on Lin Yutang's English-language novel of the same name.

== Cast and characters ==
Yao family

- Chin Han as Yao Siyuan
- Li Lingyu as Yao's wife
- Song Ning as Yao Diren
- Li Sheng as Yao Mulan
- Kan Qingzi as Yao Mochou
- Deng Lun as Yao Difei

Niu family

- Kent Cheng as Niu Sidao
- Li Fang-wen as Niu's wife
- Li Man as Niu Suyun
- Zhao Wei as Niu Huaiyu
- Peng Ling as Niu Tongyu

Zeng family

- Xu Min as Zeng Wenpu
- Jiang Lili as Zeng's wife
- Fu Yiwei as Zeng's concubine
- Wang Jialin as Zeng Binya
- Song Yunhao as Zeng Jingya
- Lee Seung-hyun as Zeng Xinya

Others

- Gao Ziqi as Kong Lifu
