= Love Through Different Times =

- Cambodian DVD cover
- Also known as: Funniest Stories of the Ming's Royalists
- Traditional Chinese: 穿越時空的愛戀
- Simplified Chinese: 穿越时空的爱恋
- Hanyu Pinyin: Chuānyuè Shíkōng de Àiliàn
- Starring: Zhang Ting; Xu Zheng
- Country of origin: China
- Original language: Mandarin

Love Through Different Times, also known as Funniest Stories of the Ming's Royalists, is a 2002 Chinese television comedy-drama.

A ludicrous story, the drama uses time travel to explain the mysterious disappearance of Ming dynasty's Jianwen Emperor after the Jingnan Campaign. It stars Taiwanese actress Zhang Ting as a kungfu-trained thief who time-traveled from modern Hong Kong to 14th-century Nanjing, where she fell in love with Zhu Yunwen (Xu Zheng), the eventual Jianwen Emperor.

It is considered the first time-travel television series produced in mainland China.

== Cast and characters ==
- Zhang Ting as Xiaowanzi
- Xu Zheng as Zhu Yunwen (Jianwen Emperor)
- Wan Hongjie as Zhu Di (Yongle Emperor)
- Liu Lili as Zhang Chuchu
- Sun Baoguang as Zhu Yuanzhang (Hongwu Emperor)
- Hou Jingyu as Zhu Shuang
- Gao Yong as Zhu Gang

== See also ==
- The Perfect Banquet, a 2004 Chinese comedy drama also starring Zhang Ting and Xu Zheng
