= Fairy of the Chalice =

Television series

- Also known as: 夜光神杯 (Ye Guang Shen Bei)
- Genre: Drama, Fantasy, Wuxia
- No. of episodes: 30

Original release
- Network: MediaCorp TV Channel 8
- Release: 10 October – 20 November 2006

Fairy of the Chalice is a television series broadcast on MediaCorp TV Channel 8 in 2006.

== Synopsis ==
Lady Nuwa (Liu Jie) imprisons an evil scorpion spirit, Wu Gong Jing. within a chalice and instructs a young fairy (known as Fairy Bei, or Fairy of the Chalice) to guard it. But in her moment of carelessness, Wu Gong Jing manages to escape. Lady Nuwa punishes Fairy Bei by binding her to the chalice because Wu Gong Jing tricked Fairy Bei and escaped. Fairy Bei has to serve 1,000 masters and grant three wishes to anyone in the mortal world before being freed from the chalice.

She is in the possession of many masters until in the hand of the father of Zheng Feng, who retains Fairy Bei for over 9 years. Zheng Feng's ex-servant, Cao Jing, becomes the villain of the story. Zheng Feng and his other, faithful servant, Qi Cheng, become involved in the battle between the Hunter's Tribe and Sheng Nu Guo (The Land of Sacred Women). Fairy Bei realizes that this problem is too much for Zheng Feng to handle himself and tries to help him, but only makes the situation worse. Her past of serving masters is what causes the main issue.

== Names ==
- Cantonese Juytping:

== Cast ==
- Roger Kwok
- Zhang Ting
- Liu Tao
- Christopher Lee
- Zhao Zi Cun
- Yvonne Lim
