= Zuo Xiaoqing =

Chinese actress and gymnast

- 左小青
- Born: June 25, 1977 (age 49); Changsha, Hunan, China
- Education: Beijing Film Academy
- Occupation: Actress
- Years active: 1998-present
- Spouse: Gao Quanjian (m. 2010; div. 2021)
- Children: 1

Zuo Xiaoqing (Chinese: 左小青; pinyin: Zuǒ Xiǎoqīng; born 25 June 1977) is a Chinese actress, TV presenter and former rhythmic gymnast.

She represented China at the 1992 World Rhythmic Gymnastics Championships. In 1993, Zuo played a minor role in Jiang Wen's directorial debut In the Heat of the Sun, which launched her acting career. Zuo has starred in several popular TV series over the years.

== Athletic career ==
Zuo Xiaoqing
Personal information
- Height: 167 cm (66 in)

Sport
- Country: China
- Sport: Gymnastics
- Event: Rhythmic gymnastics
- Team: Hunan Rhythmic Gymnastics Team (1986–1993)
- Retired: 1993

Zuo was born and raised in Changsha, Hunan. At the age of 8, she joined the Hunan's national rhythmic gymnastics team and retired in 1993.

Between 1991 and 1993, Zuo and her Hunan teammates won numerous national tournaments:

Event	Competition	Placing	Point
Domestic
1991 Chinese National Rhythmic Gymnastics Tournament	Group (All-Around)	1	37.35
1991 Chinese National Rhythmic Gymnastics Tournament	Group (3 Ropes + 3 Balls)	1	37.30
1991 Chinese National Rhythmic Gymnastics Tournament	Group (6 Ribbons)	1	37.40
1992 Chinese National Rhythmic Gymnastics Tournament	Group (All-Around)	1	36.95
1992 Chinese National Rhythmic Gymnastics Tournament	Group (3 Ropes + 3 Balls)	1	37.20
1992 Chinese National Rhythmic Gymnastics Tournament	Group (6 Ribbons)	1	37.025
1992 Chinese National Rhythmic Gymnastics Championships	Group (All-Around)	1	36.95
1992 Chinese National Rhythmic Gymnastics Championships	Group (3 Ropes + 3 Balls)	1	36.70
1992 Chinese National Rhythmic Gymnastics Championships	Group (6 Ribbons)	1	36.90
1993 7th National Games of China (Preliminary Games)	Group (All-Around)	1	36.95
1993 Chinese National Rhythmic Gymnastics Championships	Group (All-Around)	1	37.075
1993 Chinese National Rhythmic Gymnastics Championships	Group (All-Around)	1	37.2
International
1992 World Rhythmic Gymnastics Championships	Group (All-Around)	6 (tied)	37.900

== Acting career ==
Zuo made her film debut in Jiang Wen's In the Heat of the Sun (1994), playing Zhang Xiaomei. Zuo then entered Beijing Film Academy in 1995, majoring in acting, where she graduated in 1999. After graduation, Zuo worked as a hostess in Hunan Television.

From 2001 to 2009, Zuo starred in many television series, such as Qianlong Dynasty, The Great Revival and Love of The Millennium.

In 2007, Zuo played the role of Ai Xue in Approximately in the Winter, which earned her a Best Actress: Idol Award at the 4th Huading Awards.

Zuo played a good wife in the comedy film Lost on Journey (2010). That same year, she was nominated for Best TV Actress: City Award at the 6th Huading Awards for her performance in Simple Dish.

== Personal life ==
Zuo married businessman Gao Quanjian, who was more than twenty years her senior, in September 2010, and their daughter was born in July 2011. On February 1, 2021, she announced her divorce on her personal Sina Weibo account.

== Filmography ==
=== Film ===
Year	English title	Chinese title	Role	Notes
1994	In the Heat of the Sun	阳光灿烂的日子	Zhang Xiaomei	
1996	Red Moon	红月亮	Ni doudou	
2000	Because of Having Love	因为有爱	Huang Xiaoyu	
2001	Baseball Youth	棒球少年	Mi Ruowen	
2002	The Touch	天脉传奇	Qing Yanfei	
2009	Ticket	车票		
2010	Lost on Journey	人在囧途	Mei Li	
2013	The Assassin	聂隐娘		

=== Television ===
Year	English title	Chinese title	Role	Notes
2021	The Rebel Princess	上阳赋	Xie Wanru	
2020	If Time Flows Back	如果岁月可回头	Jing Ya	
2020	Rights and Benefits	权与利		
2019	The Best Partner	精英律师		Cameo
2019	Arsenal Military Academy	烈火军校	Pei Nianqing	
2014	Battle of Changsha	战长沙		
2010	New Legend of the White Snake	又见白娘子	Bai Suzhen	
2010	100 Flowers Hidden Deep	百花深处	Ke Lan	
2010	Simple Dish	家常菜	Wen Hui	
2009	Roses Shreded	红莓花儿开	Hao Yimei	
2009	Shanghai Shanghai	上海，上海	Han Rubing	
2009	Cafe	苦咖啡	Ye Xin	
2008	Our 80s	我们的八十代	Man Xiaoxing	
2008		好孕来临	Sang Xiaoqing	
2008	Golden Phoenix Bloooming	金凤花开	Li Jinfeng	
2007	Special Policewoman	非常女警	Du Xiaofeng	
2007	Approximately in the Winter	大约在冬季	Ai Xue	
2007	The Great Revival	卧薪尝胆	Ya Yu	
2007		所谓婚姻	Yang Jing	
2007	Behind the History	历史的背后	Li Yuqin	
2006		胡笳汉月	Hua Mulan	
2006		天道	Rui Xiaodan	
2005		一针见血	Fan Dan	
2005	Give the Decisive Word	一言为定	Ye Yu	
2004	Chinese Style Divorce	中国式离婚	Juanzi	
2004		非常接轨	Zhou Hui	
2004		香气迷人	Li Wan	
2004	The Vinegar Tribe	醋溜族	Lei Lei	
2004	‘’Legend of Xin Zhui	辛追传奇	Xin Zhui	
2003	Palace Artist Lang Shining	宫廷画师郎世宁	Princess	
2003	Love Song of Kangding	康定情歌	Wei Se	
2002	Qianlong Dynasty	乾隆王朝	Gurun Princess Hexiao	
2002		铁面无私	Wu Nannan	
2002	Famous Detective Zhen Guandong	名捕震关东	Ya Feng	
2001	Never Turn Back	永不回头	Yang Tong	
2000		非常警示	Du Xinran	
1999	God of Wealth	财神到	Guan Xiaoshan	
1998	Red Rock	红岩	Sun Mingxia	
1996	Black Face	黑脸	Dai Ping	

== Awards ==
Year	Work	Award	Result	Notes
2005		2005 Top Chinese TV Drama Awards - Best Actress	Won	
2011		2011 Sohu Internet TV Festival - Best Actress	Nominated	
2011		2011 Sohu Internet TV Festival - Best Screen Couple	Nominated	
2011	Simple Dish	6th Huading Awards - Best TV Actress: City	Nominated	
2010	Approximately in the Winter	5th Huading Awards - Best Actress: Idol	Won	
2012		8th Huading Awards - Favorite Star	Nominated	
2018	The Bittersweet Taiwan	24th Huading Awards - Best Actress (Period Drama)	Nominated	
2018	The Bittersweet Taiwan	5th The Actors of China Award Ceremony	Outstanding Actress (Sapphire category)	Won
