= No Lonely Angels =

- International DVD cover
- Chinese: 天使不寂寞
- Literal meaning: Angel Isn't Lonely
- Hanyu Pinyin: Tiānshǐ Bù Jìmò
- Directed by: Zhang Fanfan
- Written by: Song Chunyu
- Produced by: Yu Jia'en
- Starring: Guo Tao; Li Xiaoran; Xie Xiaodong; Tao Hong; Xu Zheng
- Cinematography: Song Xiaofei
- Production companies: Changchun Film Studio; Feifan Culture & Development
- Release date: April 1, 2002
- Running time: 88 minutes

No Lonely Angels is a 2002 Chinese drama film directed by Zhang Fanfan, starring Guo Tao and Li Xiaoran as two lovesick people in Beijing.

== Plot ==
Ten years after childhood friend He Jialing (Tao Hong) left Beijing, Lang Zhuo (Guo Tao) still calls her to leave voice messages from time to time, despite never getting any call backs. One day, he meets college student Ye Fan (Li Xiaoran), 7 years his junior, in a bar. The pair hangs out a few times to ameliorate their loneliness, but just before their relationship develops, He Jialing comes back to Beijing and moves in with Lang Zhuo. Ye Fan begins to date other men, including one who tries to rape her.

Lang Zhuo takes a business trip abroad, and calls Jialing asking her to receive a distant relative. Meanwhile, an undercover police officer Bian Qiang (Xie Xiaodong) mistakes Jialing for a prostitute involved with his drug-trafficking case. They have a dinner and Bian Qiang falls in love with her. Later, Jialing is mad that Bian Qiang has lied about his identity, but gradually discovers that she has fallen in love with him. She moves out of Lang Zhuo's apartment, leaving him an apology on his voice mail.

More than a year later, a thief named Zhao (Xu Zheng) sneaks into the unoccupied apartment and takes possession of it. He poses as the owner and rents it to Ye Fan for a large sum. Lang Zhuo returns from a failed relationship in South Korea and finds Ye Fan and her new boyfriend (Liao Fan) making out in his apartment. Even though Ye has already paid her rent, legal authorities inform her that she must move out. Watching television, Lang Zhuo realizes that Jialing has married Bian Qiang and is furious. Meanwhile, Ye Fan catches Zhao on the street, but Zhao explains he is just released from prison and has no money. They have a dinner together instead. Ye Fan decides to leave Beijing for good and goes to the airport, where he finds Lang Zhuo, also waiting in line.

== Awards ==
It won Outstanding Film (tied with A Beautiful Neighbour), Outstanding Supporting Actress (Tao Hong) and Outstanding Lighting (Ji Xiaoming) at the 24th Little Hundred Flowers Awards.
