= General Secretary Xi Jinping's Kindness We Never Forget =

Chinese political song

"General Secretary Xi Jinping's Kindness We Never Forget" (Chinese: 习总书记的恩情永不忘) is a song that praises Xi Jinping, the General Secretary of the Chinese Communist Party, which is composed by Li Changping.

The song was published in March 2019, before Lianghui. It became widespread on the internet among the Mainland Chinese community for a short time. It was subsequently removed from the Chinese internet.

== See also ==
- "The Hopes of President Xi"
