= Forgetting to Know You =

- Film poster
- Chinese: 忘了去懂你
- Hanyu Pinyin: Wàngle Qù Dǒng Nǐ
- Directed by: Quan Ling
- Written by: Quan Ling
- Produced by: Jia Zhangke
- Starring: Tao Hong; Guo Xiaodong
- Cinematography: Yu Lik-wai
- Edited by: Wang Yuan
- Music by: Lim Giong
- Production companies: Xstream Pictures; Hansen Media
- Release dates: February 13, 2013 (BIFF); August 29, 2014 (China)
- Running time: 88 minutes
- Country: China
- Language: Mandarin

Forgetting to Know You (Chinese: 忘了去懂你) is a 2013 Chinese drama film written and directed by Quan Ling. It was Quan's directorial debut. The film debuted at the 2013 63rd Berlin International Film Festival, but was not released domestically until August 29, 2014.

The film is set and filmed in Baisha (白沙), a suburban town in Jiangjin District, Chongqing. The Chinese title used at Berlin International Film Festival was Mosheng (陌生; "Unfamiliar"), but it was later changed to match the English title's meaning.

== Cast ==
- Tao Hong as Chen Xuesong, who runs a corner shop
- Guo Xiaodong as Cai Weihang, Chen's carpenter husband who wants to start a furniture business
- Zhang Wan as Yuanyuan, Chen and Cai's young daughter
- Wang Ziyi as Wu Junyan, a taxi driver who likes Chen
- Zhang Yibai as Yang Jiucheng, rich and famous man who was once friends with Chen

== Plot ==
The film deals with a normal working-class couple, whose relationship deteriorates under stress due to lack of trust and communication.

== Reception ==
David Rooney of The Hollywood Reporter praised Quan's rookie efforts as "nuanced", adding that "Tao’s performance in the central role alone makes it captivating". Derek Elley of Film Business Asia rated it 7 out of 10 and states "the film is made engrossing by its two lead actors... (Tao) simply gets better and better with age, drawing a subtle portrait of a bored wife who still longs for more than she's ended up with: tiny details in costuming, gestures and looks make this a performance that could so easily have been over-ripe."

== Awards ==
Award	Category	Individual	Result
2014 11th China Movie Channel Media Awards	Best Film		Nominated
2014 11th China Movie Channel Media Awards	Best Screenwriter	Quan Ling	Nominated
2014 11th China Movie Channel Media Awards	Best New Director	Quan Ling	Nominated
2014 11th China Movie Channel Media Awards	Best Actress	Tao Hong	Won
2014 11th China Movie Channel Media Awards	Best Actor	Guo Xiaodong	Nominated
2014 11th China Movie Channel Media Awards	Best Supporting Actor	Wang Ziyi	Won
2015 6th Youth Film Handbook Awards	Top-10 Films of the Year		Won
2015 6th Youth Film Handbook Awards	Best New Director	Quan Ling	Won (tied)
2015 6th Youth Film Handbook Awards	Best Actress	Tao Hong	Won
2015 6th Youth Film Handbook Awards	Best Actor	Guo Xiaodong	Won
2015 6th China Film Director's Guild Awards	Best Young Director	Quan Ling	Nominated
2015 6th China Film Director's Guild Awards	Best Actress	Tao Hong	Nominated
2015 Beijing College Student Film Festival	Best Actress	Tao Hong	Won (tied)
