= One Night in Supermarket =

- Official poster
- Chinese: 夜·店
- Literal meaning: Night, Store
- Hanyu Pinyin: Yè Diàn
- Directed by: Yang Qing
- Written by: Yang Qing
- Produced by: Zhao Haicheng; Ivy Yang
- Starring: Xu Zheng; Li Xiaolu; Qiao Renliang; Yang Qing; Zhang Jiayi; Zhao Yingjun; Wang Dongfang
- Cinematography: Tong Zhijian
- Edited by: Yang Xiaowei
- Music by: Ju Wenpei
- Production companies: China Film Group Corporation; Beijing Orange Sky Golden Harvest TV & Film Production; East Shanghai International Center
- Release date: July 24, 2009
- Running time: 91 minutes
- Country: China
- Language: Mandarin
- Budget: CN¥2.5 million
- Box office: CN¥12.96 million

One Night in Supermarket is a 2009 Chinese comedy film directed and written by Yang Qing, starring Xu Zheng, Li Xiaolu, Qiao Renliang, Yang Qing (not the director), Zhang Jiayi, Zhao Yingjun and Wang Dongfang. The low-budget movie, Yang's directorial debut, was filmed over 29 days in basically one location.

The story begins when a jobless man (Xu) and his doofus cousin (Wang) hold hostage the young employees (Li and Qiao) at a 24-hour supermarket, because the mart owner (Yang) had denied his lottery win. Hilarity ensues when a moronic prankster (Zhao), a myriad of shoppers, the mean owner and an at-large gunman (Zhang) enter the mart one after another.

== Plot ==
Bespectacled nerd Li Junwei (Qiao Renliang) and pretty girl Tang Xiaolian (Li Xiaolu) are manning the night shift at the 24-hour Wang Wang Supermarket when balding lottery addict He Sanshui (Xu Zheng) arrives, demanding to speak to the lady owner Wang Sufen (Yang Qing). Wang, who is not in, made a typo entering the lottery number more than a month ago, which rendered He Sanshui's winning ticket useless. When He Sanshui asked for the ¥9500 win at an earlier occasion, she attacked him and drove him out of her store. This time, He Sanshui returns with a stun gun flashlight and his dimwitted cousin He Damiao a.k.a. Tire (Wang Dongfang), and is determined to get his ¥9500 "back".

At this moment, Li's goofy roommate Zhu Liao (Zhao Yingjun) who wants to record a funny prank video also storms in, wearing a pantyhose on his face and wielding a knife, but is quickly tasered down by He Sanshui. He Sanshui proceeds to the cashier counter and realizes there isn't enough cash in the cash register. He and Tire rope up everyone else in the soundproof back room—which has a complete Karaoke system—and taking their place behind the register begin to run the store, funneling the profits into their own pockets.

The hungry Tire is getting preoccupied with bag after bag of junk food (some of which have expired) and Karaoke singing in the back, so Li—whom He Sanshui calls "Little Steel Teeth" because he wears a dental brace—is brought back out to help with the work. Some time later, Tang's escape attempt, during which she tasers down Tire, is spoiled by Zhu's foolishness and He Sanshui's second stun gun.

Wang suddenly returns to the store from her Mahjong games—obvious having lost all her money—and immediately begins to attack He Sanshui with a bag of weight before Tire tasers her down. However, holding her (and her French Bulldog Wang Wang) hostage does nothing to the business, which has been slow tonight. In an effort to boost sales He Sanshui decides to give 50% discount to all store items, and business quickly perks up after a taxicab chauffeur (Cao Li) helps spread the news to his colleagues. During this time, Tang discovers voyeuristic photos of hers in Li's phone and realizes that Li likes her.

With ¥3.50 to go before their ¥9500 goal (taking into account that Tire has eaten ¥118.10 of food), a Guanzhong dialect-speaking, gun-toting robber (Zhang Jiayi) on the run arrives to retrieve a diamond his partner left in the ice in the store freezer. Unable to find his diamond he takes everyone hostage and is in the middle of having everyone strip, when Yaozi (Ye Qian)—the store's delivery man who has fallen asleep in the warehouse—barges out from the rear. The group tries to subdue the gunman, but fails because He Sanshui's stun gun has run out of battery.

When the diamond is finally discovered during the subsequent search, the dog Wang Wang picks it up and runs outside. This is when the gunman realizes that the police have already surrounded the store: it was Tang who secretly texted a policeman shopper (Li Weijian). The gunman runs back inside, grabs Tang and points his gun to her head. Li saves Tang but is shot by the gunman, who is accidentally electrocuted by a loose wire.

Some time later, the policeman returns to the store and learns that Li—no longer wearing a brace and glasses—and Tang have been dating, while He Sanshui and Wang are honeymooning in Hainan. They watch on TV that Zhu has become a famous actor, and Tire his agent.

== Reception ==
The film was well received by domestic critics. Foreign reviews were likewise mainly positive: Derek Elley of Variety called it a "slickly-made feature debut", and Matthew Lee of Screen Anarchy called it "an impressive debut, a sparkling little comedy that warrants a good deal of acclaim".

=== Awards ===
The film won 2 awards at the China Movie Channel Media Awards held during the 2009 Shanghai International Film Festival. Yang Qing won Favourite Screenwriter and Xu Zheng won Favourite Actor.

At the 2009 Locarno International Film Festival in Locarno, Switzerland, it received special mention for the Network for the Promotion of Asian Cinema (NETPAC) Jury Award.

== Theme song ==
The ending theme song "Tonight" was written by Peng Tan and performed by Qiao Renliang. It was included in Qiao's 2009 album Diamond (钻石).

Tire's favourite song is "Liang Zhi Hudie" (两只蝴蝶; "Two Butterflies") by Pang Long. The Jay Chou songs Tire and Zhu Liao sang include "Qian Li Zhi Wai" (千里之外; "A Thousand Li Away") and "Shuang Jie Gun" (双截棍; "Nunchucks").
