= Chang Ting (actress) =

Taiwanese actress

- Born: Changhua County, Taiwan
- Spouse: Lin Jui-yang (m. 2010)
- Children: 2

Chinese name
- Traditional Chinese: 張庭
- Simplified Chinese: 张庭
Transcriptions
Standard Mandarin
- Hanyu Pinyin: Zhāng Tíng
- Musical career
- Also known as: Chang Ting

Chang Ting or Zhang Ting is a Taiwanese actress. She shifted her career to mainland China in the late 1990s. Since the 2010s, she has mainly focused on the direct selling business with her husband, actor-turned-businessman Kevin Lin.

== Selected filmography ==
- Justice Pao (1993), Taiwan
- Love Through Different Times (2002), China
- The Eloquent Ji Xiaolan (2002), China
- The Perfect Banquet (2004), China
- The Great Adventure (2005), Hong Kong
- Fairy of the Chalice (2006), Singapore
- Beauty World (2011), China
- The Empress of China (2014), China
- The Legend of the Treasure Basin (2003), China
- Happy Flying Dragon (1998), China
- The Switch (2000), Taiwan
- The Switch 2 (2004), Taiwan
- Liao Zhai Hua Gu Zi (2004), China
