= The Great Adventure (Hong Kong TV series) =

Hong Kong television series

- Promotional poster
- 大冒險家
- Genre: Drama; Action
- Directed by: Tong Tik; Bill Chan
- Starring: Francis Ng; Dayo Wong; Flora Chan; Zhang Ting; Kenneth Tsang; Li Qiang; Kelly Fu
- Theme music composer: Ricky Fan
- Opening theme: The Great Risk Taker (大冒險家) by Patrick Tam
- Ending theme: Major Figure (大人物) by Zhao Rong
- Composer: Ricky Fan
- Country of origin: Hong Kong
- Original language: Cantonese
- No. of episodes: 34

Production
- Producers: Poon Man-kit; Allen Chan
- Production locations: Hong Kong; China; Taiwan; Thailand
- Cinematography: Lai Hung-chow; Siu Chan-tak
- Editor: Chow Wai-keung
- Camera setup: Multi camera
- Production company: One Dollar Production

Original release
- Network: ATV Home
- Release: 5 December 2005 – 22 January 2006

The Great Adventure
- Traditional Chinese: 大冒險家
- Simplified Chinese: 大冒险家
- Literal meaning: "The Great Risk Taker"
Transcriptions
Standard Mandarin
- Hanyu Pinyin: Dà Mào Xiǎn Jiā
Yue: Cantonese
- Jyutping: Daai6 Mou6 Him2 Ga1

The Great Adventure is a 2005 Hong Kong modern serial drama starring Francis Ng, Dayo Wong and Flora Chan. It was produced by One Dollar Production and was aired on ATV Home from 5 December 2005 to 22 January 2006. This series tells about the changes in Hong Kong between the 1970s and 1990s.

== Cast ==
=== Main cast ===
Cast	Role	Description
Francis Ng	Fan Sau-mong 范守望	Businessman
Dayo Wong	Pak Wut 白活	Businessman
Flora Chan	To Lei-kuen 陶莉娟	Executive
Zhang Ting	Yip Mei 葉媚	Lover of a triad leader A helms-woman
Kenneth Tsang	Fan Kan 范根	Traditional Chinese physician Fan Sau-mong's father
Li Qiang	Yue Kai-kwong 于繼光	Businessman

=== Other cast ===
Cast	Role	Description
Cui Peng	Lee Tik 李的	
Chow Chiu	Ngo Wan-chi 柯韻姿	
Chiu Wing	Fan Hoi-sam 范開心	
Ma Su	Yau Yin 尤然	
Gabriel Harrison	Chan Ka-ming 陳家明	
Cheung Foon	Wong Siu-keung 黃小強	has a minor intellectual disability
Heung Siu-kiu	Yue Ching 于程	
Phillip Keung	Cheung Hung 蔣雄	
Jones Sung	Yip Nam 葉南	
Paw Hee-ching	Mok Suk-ngo 莫淑娥	
Cheung Na	Mimi 咪咪	
Cheng Kam-wing	Heung Tung 向東	
Ricky Chan	Lok Man 駱文	
Cheng Shu-fung	Lee Kui-fu 李巨富	
Lee Wai-sang	Ngo Man-chuen 柯萬全	
Leung Ngoi	Granny Wong 黃婆婆	
