= Lobsang Chompel =

Chinese actor (1957–2025)

- བློ་བཟང་ཆོས་འཕེལ་
- Born: 15 July 1957
- Died: 10 October 2025 (aged 68); Lhasa, Tibet, China
- Education: Shanghai Theatre Academy
- Occupation: Actor

Lobsang Chompel (Standard Tibetan: བློ་བཟང་ཆོས་འཕེལ་; Chinese: 洛桑群培; 15 July 1957 – 10 October 2025) was a Chinese actor.

His role in the 1998 film Xiu Xiu: The Sent Down Girl won him Best Leading Actor in the 35th Golden Horse Awards. He also starred in the 2023 film Snow Leopard and received a nomination for Best Supporting Actor in the 37th Golden Rooster Awards.

Chompel died in Lhasa on 10 October 2025, at the age of 68.
