= Xiu Xiu: The Sent Down Girl =

- Theatrical release poster
- Chinese: 天浴
- Literal meaning: Celestial Bath
- Hanyu Pinyin: Tiān Yù
- Directed by: Joan Chen
- Screenplay by: Joan Chen; Geling Yan
- Based on: "Celestial Bath" by Geling Yan
- Produced by: Alice Chen; Joan Chen
- Starring: Li Xiaolu; Lobsang Chompel; Zheng Qian
- Cinematography: Lü Yue
- Edited by: Ruby Yang
- Music by: Johnny Chen
- Production companies: Good Machine; Whispering Steppes L.P.
- Release dates: February 19, 1998 (Berlinale); May 7, 1999 (US)
- Running time: 99 minutes
- Country: China
- Language: Mandarin
- Box office: $1 million

Xiu Xiu: The Sent Down Girl (Chinese: 天浴; pinyin: Tiān Yù; lit. 'Celestial Bath') is a 1998 Chinese drama film directed by Joan Chen in her directorial debut, who co-wrote the screenplay with Geling Yan. Based on Yan's 1981 short story "Celestial Bath", the film is set in the 1970s during the Cultural Revolution's Down to the Countryside Movement in People's Republic of China. The film stars Li Xiaolu as the titular character, with Lobsang Chompel also starring. The film premiered at the 48th Berlin International Film Festival and collected top prizes from various film festivals. It was released in the United States on May 7, 1999.

== Plot ==
Wenxiu, nicknamed Xiu Xiu, a 15-year-old girl living in the city of Chengdu, is sent out to study horses in the countryside with a nomadic Tibetan. She is told that after six months, she will return to take charge of her all-girl cavalry unit. Her only friend is the eunuch horseman Lao Jin, who takes care of her while teaching her to herd horses. But after the six months are up, she quickly discovers that she is not allowed to return.

As Xiu Xiu loses hope, she falls for the lies of a peddler who tells her he can get her out of the place, but does not return after having sex with her. Her innocence is slowly corrupted by a stream of men who use her only for sex, barely keeping up the conceit by telling her that they are able to get her back to her hometown. She starts to believe the lies the men perfunctorily tell her, as she spitefully lectures Lao Jin that the men who come in the night and have their way with her are important men who can help her get back.

Xiu Xiu gets pregnant and goes for a traumatic abortion in the hospital. The female doctors gossip about her. After the operation, she is raped by one of the patients, a man who shot himself in the foot to get disability benefits in the state-controlled economy. Lao Jin gets angry and assaults the rapist, but is restrained by the other patients while the doctors make snide remarks about how Xiu Xiu enjoys being raped.

After Xiu recuperates, she tries to shoot herself in the foot so she can get sent back home, but cannot bring herself to pull the trigger. She asks Lao Jin to shoot her foot, then changes her mind and asks him to shoot her dead instead. He does so, then shoots himself and falls on her body.

== Cast ==
- Li Xiaolu (credited as Lu Lu) as Wenxiu (文秀), nicknamed Xiu Xiu (秀秀)
- Lobsang Chompel as Lao Jin (老金)
- Zheng Qian as Li Chuanbei
- Ji Gao as Mother
- Qianqian Lee as Sister
- Yue Lü as Father

== Production ==
The film was shot on location in Tibet over a period of six weeks with a crew of 60. Joan Chen said she would smuggle film out of China almost every day of the shoot for fear that Chinese authorities might confiscate all of it if they discovered what kind of film she was making. This prevented her from watching playbacks and led to a rushed shooting schedule.

== Reception ==
=== Critical reception ===
On review aggregate website Rotten Tomatoes, Xiu Xiu: The Sent Down Girl has an approval rating of 96% based on 24 reviews. The site's critics consensus reads, "A superb first outing from debuting director Joan Chen, Xiu Xiu: The Sent Down Girl uses one person's grueling ordeal to probe a dark chapter in Chinese history." Andrew Sarris of The New York Observer called the film "the most devastatingly implacable indictment of Mao's Great Cultural Revolution as is possible to imagine." Desson Howe of The Washington Post said the film's subject matter made for a difficult watch, but also commented the film is "nicely photographed, well directed and has two delicate lead performances from Lu Lu and Lopsang." Film critic Roger Ebert praised the film's understated dialogue, particularly highlighting the relationship between Lao Jin and Xiu Xiu as one of shared isolation and quiet suffering, likening them to "two fellow prisoners who scarcely speak the same language."

=== Release ===
The film premiered at the 1998 Berlin International Film Festival on February 19, 1998. In December 1998, the film won several awards at the Golden Horse Film Festival in Taiwan, prompting Taiwanese media to report that Chen had circumvented regulations by China's Film Bureau in order to shoot in Tibet. Chen was subsequently fined and briefly banned in China. Chen apologized to the Bureau and said she had initially applied for a film permit, but was given a mandate by officials to remove "sexual and pessimistic scenes from the film" in order to obtain the permit.

When the film was released in the United States in May 1999, the film's marketing focused on Xiu Xiu's sexual and political content as the primary reason for its ban in China.

=== Awards and nominations ===
Golden Horse Awards

- 1998: Won for Best Film (Joan Chen)
- 1998: Won for Best Director (Joan Chen)
- 1998: Won for Best Screenplay Adapted from Another Medium (Joan Chen)
- 1998: Won for Best Actress (Li Xiaolu)
- 1998: Won for Best Actor (Lobsang Chompel)

48th Berlin International Film Festival

- 1998: Nominated for the Golden Bear

Fort Lauderdale International Film Festival

- 1998: Won the Jury Award

Paris Film Festival

- 1999: Won the Special Jury Prize
- 1999: Nominated for the Grand Prize
- 1999: Won Best Actress (Li Xiaolu)

Mons International Festival of Love Films

- 1999: Won the Grand Prize

National Board of Review

- 1999: Won the International Freedom Award

Independent Spirit Awards

- 2000: Nominated for Best First Feature Over $500,000 (Joan Chen, shared with co-producer Alice Chan Wai-Chung)
