= I'm a Boss =

- Also known as: I am a Boss
- Traditional Chinese: 我是老闆
- Simplified Chinese: 我是老板
- Hanyu Pinyin: Wǒ Shì Lǎobǎn
- Created by: Zheng Xiaolong; Li Xiaoming
- Written by: Gong Xiangdong
- Directed by: Zheng Xiaolong
- Starring: Jiang Wu; Zhang Heng; Wang Yajie; Wang Lei
- Opening theme: "Xiangxin Weilai" (相信未来) performed by Eric Moo
- Ending theme: "Nanren Sishi" (男人四十) performed by Kao Ming-chun
- Composer: Meng Ke
- Country of origin: China
- Original language: Mandarin
- No. of episodes: 34

Production
- Producer: Cao Ping
- Cinematography: Wang Junbo
- Running time: 45 minutes
- Production companies: Beijing TV Art Center; Flower Film & TV

Original release
- Network: Beijing Television
- Release: May 1 – May 12, 2009

I'm a Boss is a 2009 Chinese television comedy-drama directed by Zheng Xiaolong, starring Jiang Wu as an idiosyncratic and Quixotic mid-aged Ma Yiming who, forced to leave his government career, enters the business world as an entrepreneur. Ma Yiming is a likeable character who is selfless, dependable, diligent, upstanding, and full of righteousness, but who is also utterly unsuccessful; his frequently amusing misfortunes highlight the contrast between the ideal that the Communist-Party propagates and the capitalistic reality in contemporary Chinese society.

== Broadcast ==
The show was first broadcast in May 2009 on Beijing Television. In Taiwan, it was shown on Videoland Max-TV in March 2010.

== Cast and characters ==
- Jiang Wu as Ma Yiming, the protagonist
- Zhang Heng as Shi Hong, a nurse and Ma Yiming's wife
- Wang Lei as Shi Jun, Shi Hong's jobless brother, though he claims he owns a million-dollar company
- Wang Jingsong as Ma Yiping, a taxicab driver and Ma Yiming's brother
- Wang Yajie as Li Qinqin, a landlady
- Niu Piao as Feng Zhiyuan, a businessman
- Xu Zheng as Xu Tianlai, a businessman
- Li Jingjing as Bai Lihua, a businesswoman
- Fu Miao as Chen Xi, a gold-digging secretary
- Li Xiaomeng as Ranran, a young bartender
- Liu Yiwei as a businessman
- Fang Zige as Ma Yiming's superior

== Awards and nominations ==
Xu Zheng was nominated for Best Supporting Actor at the 4th Huading Awards.
