= Jack of All Trades (2012 film) =

- Traditional Chinese: 神通鄉巴佬
- Simplified Chinese: 神通乡巴佬
- Hanyu Pinyin: Shéntōng Xiāngbālǎo
- Directed by: Pi Jianxin
- Written by: Ma Zhiquan; Lin Manru
- Produced by: Du Dayu; Wang Dafang; Yang Wenquan; Xu Jiaxuan; Shao Fei
- Starring: Wang Baoqiang; Eric Tsang; Sherry Cao
- Cinematography: Xu Zhiwei
- Edited by: Ma Binbin
- Music by: Lin Shunlang
- Production companies: Tianjin Film Studio; Jiuzhou Audio and Video Publishing Company; Beijing Mengjiangwei Movie & TV culture Co., Ltd
- Distributed by: Longteng Yidu Industry Investment Co., LTD; Shanghai Xinwenhua Media Group Co., LTD; China Film Group Corporation
- Release date: March 8, 2012
- Running time: 86 minutes
- Country: China
- Language: Mandarin

Jack of All Trades is a 2012 Chinese romantic comedy film directed by Pi Jianxin and written by Ma Zhiquan and Lin Manru, starring Wang Baoqiang, Eric Tsang, and Sherry Cao. The film premiered in China on 8 March 2012.

== Cast ==
- Wang Baoqiang as Chu Zhongtian, known by his nickname Lin Danda, a simple and honest young man from countryside.
  - Ou Chuanhao as little Chu Zhongtian.
- Eric Tsang as Zhu Yuepo, known by his nickname Zhu Dupi, a businessman.
- Sherry Cao as Fang Yuanyuan, the blind girl who is a flower peddler.

=== Other ===
- Grace Ko as Zhu Yuepo's wife.
- Ronan Lo as Zhu Yuepo's son.
- Liao Bencheng as Chu Zhongtian's father.
- Cao Yue'e as Chu Zhongtian's mother.
- Bi Zhigang as Zhu Yuepo's son-in-law.
- Benny Bin as Zhu Yuepo's grandson.

== Production ==
This film took place in Xinyi District, Taipei.

== Release ==
It was released in China on 8 March 2012.
