= Huang Zuoqing =

Qing entrepreneur

- Born: 1839; Huzhou, Zhejiang, Qing Empire
- Died: July 1902 (aged 62–63) southern Jiangsu, Qing Empire
- Occupation: businessman
- Children: at least 3 sons including Huang Jinquan (黃晉荃)

Chinese name
- Traditional Chinese: 黃佐卿
- Simplified Chinese: 黄佐卿
Transcriptions
Standard Mandarin
- Hanyu Pinyin: Huáng Zuǒqīng
- Wade–Giles: Huang^{2} Tso^{3}-ch'ing^{1}

Huang Zongxian
- Traditional Chinese: 黃宗憲
- Simplified Chinese: 黄宗宪
Transcriptions
Standard Mandarin
- Hanyu Pinyin: Huáng Zōngxiàn
- Wade–Giles: Huang^{2} Tsung^{1}-hsien^{4}

Chang-kee
- Traditional Chinese: 昌記
- Simplified Chinese: 昌记
Transcriptions
Standard Mandarin
- Hanyu Pinyin: Chāngjì
- Wade–Giles: Ch'ang^{1}-chi^{4}

Huang Zongxian (1839 – July 1902), courtesy name Zuoqing, was a Qing dynasty entrepreneur who in 1881 founded Chang-kee Silk Filature, the first Chinese-owned modern silk filature, in Shanghai. In 1894, he partnered with the official Zhang Zhidong to found a state-sponsored silk filature in Wuchang, which allowed him to obtain official titles.

Most westerners in the Shanghai International Settlement knew him as Chang-kee which was actually the initial name of his business. His name was also spelled as Wang Tso-ch'ing.

== Early life ==
Huang Zuoqing was from a well-to-do family in Linghu Town (菱湖), Gui'an County (歸安), Huzhou, Zhejiang, Qing Empire, and received a good early education. Like many adolescents in Huzhou (known in China as the "City of Silk"), he worked as an apprentice in a silk shop as a teenager. In the late 1850s, he moved to Shanghai with his family when Taiping rebels attacked Zhejiang. In Shanghai Huang Zuoqing found a job in a silk store, and showing diligence and competence, he was well trusted by the store owner. He also learned English in his spare time. This skill enabled him to act as a trade agent between Chinese manufacturers of hand-reeled silk and western exporters. Because western demand for silk from China was increasingly high (due to an 1850s silkworm disease epidemic in Europe, coupled with the rise of American and French silk-weaving industries at the time), Huang earned a sizable income from the commissions.

== Establishing the Chang-kee Filature ==
In the early 1870s, Huang opened Hsiang-kee (祥記), his own silk store on Shanghai's Jiangxi Road (江西路). In addition to hand-reeled silk, Huang also purchased raw silk and cocoons for his foreign partners. At that point, it became increasingly obvious that traditional hand-reeled silk could not compete with machine-run, steam-reeled silk in quality and consistency demanded by the global market, not to mention efficiency. In 1861, British merchants had established the Ewo Filature (怡和絲廠) in Shanghai, the first steam filature in China. It significantly rocked the Chinese silk industry, so much that it had to close in 1869 due to the guild of Chinese silk merchants preventing it from acquiring a reliable supply of cocoons. In 1878, Kee Chong Filature (旗昌繅絲廠) was established in Shanghai by the Americans, which became so successful that it expanded to as many as 1000 reels.

== Partnership with Zhang Zhidong ==
In 1894, the Viceroy of Huguang and well-known reformer Zhang Zhidong planned to establish the Hubei (Hupeh) Silk Filature (湖北繅絲廠) in Wuchang, as part of the country's Self-Strengthening Movement. He already knew about Huang Zuoqing—who owned a silk shop in Hankou just across the Yangtze from Wuchang—and he asked Zhao Shuqiao (趙舒翹), Governor of Jiangsu (which administered Shanghai), to invite Huang Zuoqing to Wuchang to run his business venture. Huang Zuoqing agreed to invest 20,000 taels of silver and recommended his third son Huang Jinquan (黃晉荃) to serve as the manager. Zhang Zhidong was ecstatic, and through his recommendation Huang Zuoqing received a title equivalent to an official of the second-rank from the imperial court.

However, Zhang Zhidong wanted a "government-supervised and merchant-managed" enterprise; Huang refused. After trying and failing to find other merchant partners, Zhang Zhidong again turned to Huang Zuoqing, this time agreeing to a joint state-private partnership. Huang Zuoqing invested 470,000 taels of silver, and the Hubei Silk Filature was established. But Huang Jinquan discovered that the purchased machines were inferior and even defective, because someone cooked the books. The problem was not resolved until several rounds of negotiations, and the filature did not start running until May 1896, with 208 reels and 300 laborers. Though the Filature had some success, because of too many government restrictions the Huangs could not agree with the state on several aspects. In May 1897, Huang Jinquan completely withdrew from the Hubei Filature and returned to Shanghai.

== Bankruptcy and death ==
Around this time, Huang Zuoqing's Yu Jin Spinning Mill (裕晉紗廠) in Yangpu District, Shanghai, with 1,500 laborers and 15,000 spindles, was also under financial distress, as it could not compete with the state-run monopolies under bureaucrats Li Hongzhang and Sheng Xuanhuai. Huang Zuoqing had no choice but look for foreign investment, and this eventually led to bankruptcy. The factory, under the new name Xing Tai Spinning Mill (興泰紗廠), was purchased by the Japanese Mitsui & Co. in 1902. Huang Zuoqing died in July 1902, on the way back to Shanghai after a business trip to Suzhou where he contracted cholera.
