= Sky Lovers (TV series) =

- Also known as: Sky Lover; Skylovers
- Traditional Chinese: 天空下的緣分
- Simplified Chinese: 天空下的缘分
- Literal meaning: Romantic Fate Under the Sky
- Hanyu Pinyin: Tiānkōng Xià de Yuánfèn
- Created by: Zhang Yibai; Wu Lala
- Directed by: Qian Yongqiang
- Creative director: Zhang Yang
- Opening theme: "Xiangshui" (香水) performed by Nicholas Tse
- Country of origin: China
- Original language: Mandarin
- No. of episodes: 30

Production
- Executive producer: Zheng Xinmin
- Producer: Er Yong
- Running time: 45 minutes
- Production companies: Nei Mongol Television; Beijing Zhennan Culture & Arts

Original release
- Release: 2002

Sky Lovers is a 2002 Chinese romance television series produced by Nei Mongol Television in conjunction with Beijing Zhennan Culture & Arts (北京震南文化艺术). It includes 6 unrelated love stories, each 5 episodes long.

The opening theme song is "Xiangshui" (香水; "Perfume") performed by Nicholas Tse.

== Segments ==
Every segment is named after a pop song, which is then used as the end theme song of that segment.

Segment	End theme song (segment name)	Starring
1 (Ep. 1–5)	"Moonlight in the City" (城里的月光; "Cheng Li de Yueguang") performed by Mavis Hee	Li Xiaolu; Zhang Fengyi
2 (Ep. 6–10)	"My Desired Happiness" (我要的幸福; "Wo Yao de Xingfu") performed by Stefanie Sun	Alien Sun; Xia Yu
3 (Ep. 11–15)	"It's Sunny At Your Place" (你那边是晴天; "Ni Nabian Shi Qingtian") performed by Maggie Chiang	Xu Jinglei; Wang Xuebing
4 (Ep. 16–20)	"My Lover" (我的爱人; "Wo de Airen") performed by Jordan Chan	Li Bingbing; Jordan Chan
5 (Ep. 21–25)	"Sun Tanning" (日光浴; "Riguang Yu") performed by Nick Cheung	Tao Hong; Nick Cheung
6 (Ep. 26–30)	"The Most Familiar Stranger" (最熟悉的陌生人; "Zui Shuxi de Moshi") performed by Elva Hsiao	Liu Bei; Jiang Wu
