= The Hopes of President Xi =

"The Hopes of President Xi", also known as "To Be an Upright Man for a Lifetime", is a song written by Chinese leader Xi Jinping and composed by Yanhui Jiang (姜延辉).

The song is sung by detainees in the Xinjiang re-education camps.

== See also ==
- "General Secretary Xi Jinping's Kindness We Never Forget"
