= Lost in Russia =

2020 film directed by Xu Zheng

- Film poster
- Traditional Chinese: 囧媽
- Simplified Chinese: 囧妈
- Hanyu Pinyin: Jiǒng Mā
- Directed by: Xu Zheng
- Written by: He Keke; Bululufu; He Yiqiao; Xu Zheng
- Produced by: Liu Ruifang
- Starring: Xu Zheng; Huang Meiying; Yuan Quan
- Cinematography: Liu Yizeng
- Edited by: Wang Yuan
- Music by: Yang Jiang; Zhao Nan
- Production companies: Huanxi Media; Hg Entertainment; Maoyan; Sublime Media; Joy Leader Culture Communication Co., Ltd. Mokexing Film Beijing Co., Ltd.
- Distributed by: ByteDance
- Release date: 25 January 2020
- Running time: 126 minutes
- Country: China
- Language: Mandarin

Lost in Russia (Chinese: 囧妈; lit. 'awkward mother', Russian: Затерянные в России) is a 2020 Chinese comedy film co-written and directed by Xu Zheng, who also stars in the lead role. The film can be considered the third in the "Lost in" series by Xu Zheng, following Lost in Thailand and Lost in Hong Kong, although all three films' plot and characters are unrelated, and Xu himself has not confirmed a connection between the three films.

The film follows the story of an awkward journey to Russia of a manipulative mother and her middle-aged son who wanted to rebel and escape on the K3 train. The film premiered in China digitally on January 25, 2020, during the Chinese New Year.

== Cast ==
- Xu Zheng as Xu Ivan, the boss of "Nuanba". His first name, Ivan, comes from the 1962 Soviet war drama film Ivan's Childhood, which was a favorite film of his mother.
- Huang Meiying as Lu Xiaohua, Xu's mother.
- Yuan Quan as Zhang Lu, Xu's soon to be ex-wife.
- Jia Bing as conductor.
- Guo Jingfei as Guo Tie, Xu's assistant.
- Huang Jingyu as Da Long, Xu's driver (cameo).
- Godfrey Gao as Michael.
- Shen Teng as a passenger.
- Song Xiaobao
- Huang Bo as a billionaire (cameo).
- Olga Magnytskao as Natasha.

== Production ==
Most of the film was shot on location in Russia. Filming locations included Lake Baikal, Moscow, and Saint Petersburg.

== Release ==
The film was slated for release on January 24, 2020 in China, but was withdrawn due to COVID-19 pandemic. ByteDance later acquired the distribution rights to the film in China for 630 million yuan, one of the largest distribution fees ever paid for a Chinese comedy film. On January 25, 2020, the film was digitally released on ByteDance's platforms TikTok and Xigua Video for free.
