= Li Xiaolu =

Chinese actress and singer

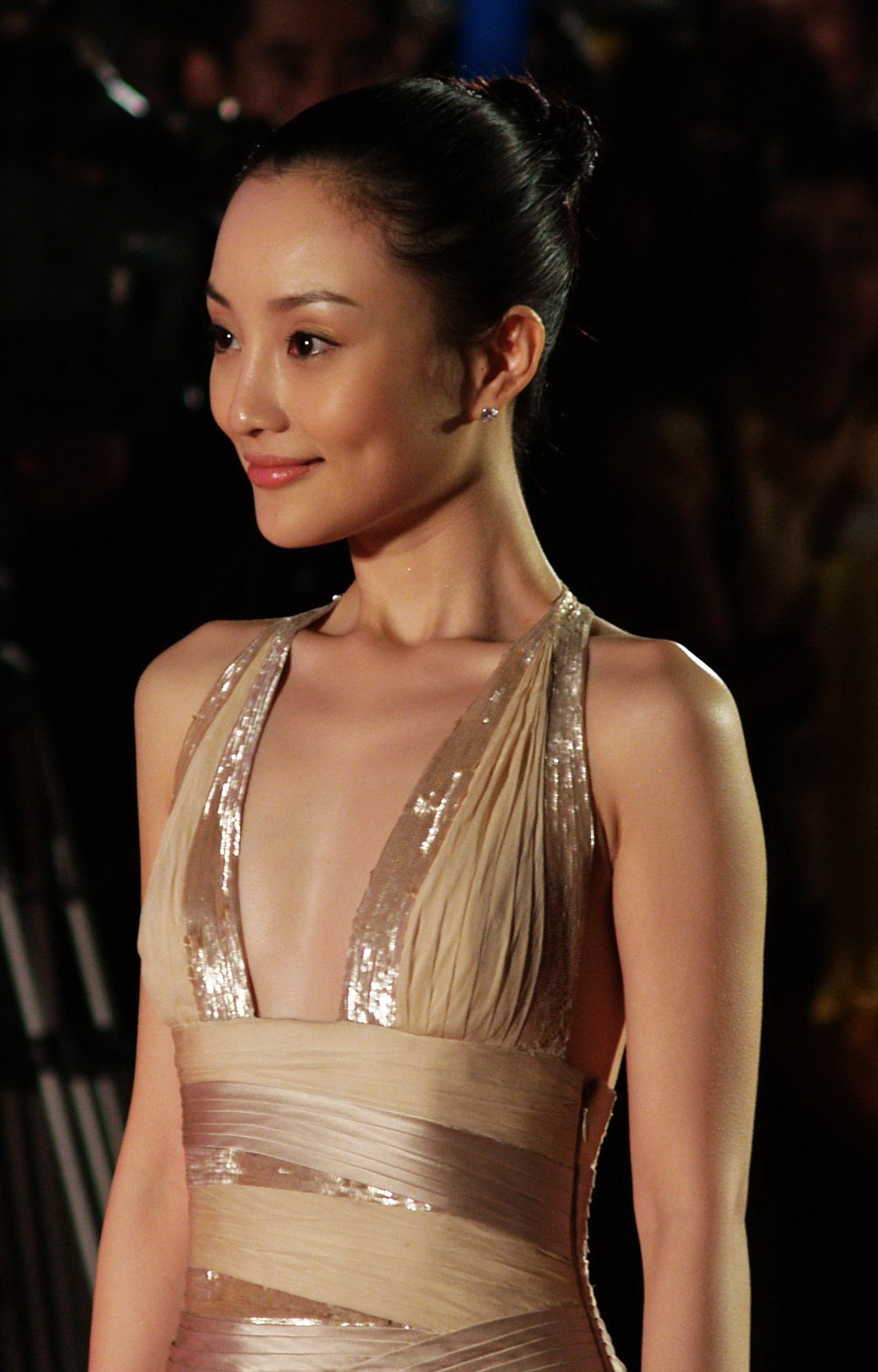
- Li in 2007
- Born: 30 September 1982 (age 43); Beijing, China
- Education: Beijing USA College of English
- Occupations: Actress; singer
- Years active: 1984–2019
- Agent: Li Xiaolu Studio
- Spouse: Jia Nailiang (m. 2012; div. 2019)
- Children: 1
- Musical career
- Also known as: Jacqueline Li
- Genres: Mandopop
- Instrument: Vocals

Li Xiaolu (Chinese: 李小璐; pinyin: Lǐ Xiǎolù, born 30 September 1982), also known as Jacqueline Li, is a Chinese actress and singer. She is best known for her role in Joan Chen's directing debut Xiu Xiu: The Sent Down Girl (1998), idol drama All the Misfortunes Caused by the Angel (2001) and the popular youth series Struggle (2007). At age 16, she was the youngest actress to win the Golden Horse Award for Best Leading Actress.

== Early life ==
Li was born into an artistic family. Her grandfather was a worker at the August First Film Studios; and both her parents were actors. She first appeared in a television series at the age of 3.

== Career ==
Li first rose to fame with the 1998 movie Xiu Xiu: The Sent Down Girl, which won her Best Actress awards at the Golden Horse Awards, Paris Film Festival and the Deauville Asian Film Festival. At age 17, she was the youngest actress to win the Golden Horse Awards for Best Actress. She laid low for the next two years, but in 2001, was thrust back into the limelight with her role in the popular idol drama All the Misfortunes Caused by the Angel (2001).

In 2005, Li won the Best Actress award at the Romania International Film Festival for her performance in the Sino-Japanese film About Love.

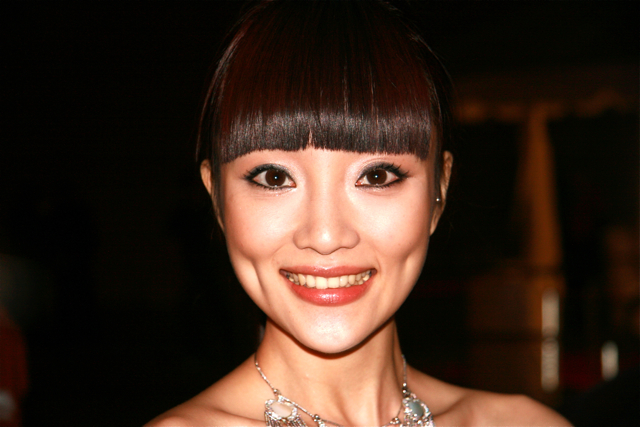
Li in 2007

In 2007, she co-starred in the youth series Struggle. Based on the popular novel by Shi Kang, Struggle gained unexpected acclaim and was seen as a breakthrough in Chinese TV production as it broke from the usual Chinese TV series focusing in traditional legends and series. Her role as the bratty and adorable Yang Xiaoyun was a hit with the audience and propelled her to a household name in China. Due to her popularity, Li was crowned the "Golden Eagle Goddess" at the China Golden Eagle TV Art Festival, where she performed as the opening act to the ceremony.

In 2011, Li starred in the ancient fantasy series Beauty World (2011), her first period drama in six years.

Li's subsequent roles in the family dramas My Mom and My Mother-in-Law (2011), AA Lifestyle (2012) and We Love You, Mr. Jin (2012) cemented her image as the "Nation's Daughter-in-Law" in China. She won the Best Actress at the Huading Awards for her role in My Mom and My Mother-in-Law.

In 2013, Li starred in comedy film Personal Tailor directed by Feng Xiaogang, playing multiple roles in the film. Personal Tailor was one of the highest grossing films of the year.

== Personal life ==
Li married actor Jia Nailiang in 2012. The same year, she gave birth to their daughter, Jelena, who gained popularity with the parenting reality show Dad Came Back.

On the evening of 29 December 2017, Li was photographed spending the night at rapper PG One's home while her husband was livestreaming and claiming that she had gone to "get her hair done," seemingly unaware of her actual whereabouts. On 30 October 2019, three intimate videos of PG One and Li surfaced online. PG One later admitted they were filmed in March and April 2018, but he denied that their alleged affair from December 2017 was true. He stated that after the December incident, all his work was halted, and during their most difficult times, he and Li supported each other, eventually developing a relationship. After the revelation of her affair, Li effectively withdrew from the entertainment industry. She and Jia divorced on 14 November 2019.

== Filmography ==
=== Film ===
Year	English title	Chinese title	Role	Notes	Ref.
1984	Little Island	小岛			
1987	I only cried three times	我只流三次泪	Xiaoxiao		
1994	Stay in the Country to Examine	留村察看	Xiao Fang		
1998	Xiu Xiu: The Sent Down Girl	天浴	Wenxiu		
2003	Let Us Remember	让我们记住	Lin Lin		
2005	About Love	恋爱地图	Yun Yun		
2005	Rainbow	我心飞翔	Hong		
2007	Blood Brothers	天堂口	Su Zhen		
2008	Desires of the Heart	桃花运	Xiao Mei		
2009	Push	异能	Pop Girl		
2009	One Night in Supermarket	夜店	Tang Xiaolian		
2009	Love at Seventh Sight	七天爱上你	Yanqing / Baiye		
2010	The Haunting Lover	等着你回来	Xiao Furong		
2010	Lost On Journey	人在囧途	Nana		
2011		无敌销房队	Moon		
2013	Timeless Love	时光恋人	Fang Lin		
2013	Personal Tailor	私人定制	Xiao Lu		
2014	Forbidden Kiss	古堡之吻	Yuan Ni		
2015	The Vanished Murderer	消失的凶手2	Chang Sheng		
2015	Oh My God	从天儿降	Lu Mijia		

=== Television series ===
Year	English title	Chinese title	Role	Notes/Ref.
1984	Kong Zi	孔子青少年时代	young Kong Zi	
1991	Taiji Prodigy	少年张三丰	young Xiao Lian	
1997	Mother	母亲	Ling Zhi	
1999		乡野奇谈之长寿不老猴	Cui Yan	
2000		迷侠	Ah Mi	
2001	All the Misfortunes Caused by the Angel	都是天使惹的祸	Lin Xiaoru	
2001	Red Alert	红色警戒	Wei Jifeng	
2001		蝶舞天涯	Er Duo	
2001	Sky Lovers	天空下的缘分	Ah Mei	
2001	The young hero Hong Wen Ding	少年英雄之洪文定	Ji Fulei	
2002	The Legendary Siblings 2	绝世双骄	Ziyan	
2002	Taiji Prodigy	少年张三丰	Ming Daohong	
2002	Stories of Youth	青春的童话	Mo Nan	
2003	My Naughty Angel	我的淘气天使	Cheng Xiaolu	
2003	River of No Return	大江东去	Shen Bingbing	
2004	First Kind of Crisis	第一种危机	Xiao Ruoyu	
2004	13th Princess	十三格格	Shu Lin	
2005		爱比恨多一点	Ying Zi	
2005	The Dragon Heroes	赤子乘龙	Shui Linglong / Feicui	
2005	Eight Heroes	八大豪侠	Le Qianqian	
2006	Painful Love	刻骨铭心的爱	Lin Xiaoxi	
2006		风吹云动星不动	Niu Manchan	
2007	Struggle	奋斗	Yang Xiaoyun	
2007	Just Give Me A Call	麻雀爱上凤凰	Xiao Ruoyu	
2009	Fight Beiping	战北平	Liu Fanyu	
2009	Knock Knock Loving You	敲敲爱上你	Tang Qingwu	
2011	My Mother and My Mother-in-Law	当婆婆遇上妈	Luo Jia	
2011	Beauty World	唐宫美人天下	Helan Xin'er	
2012	AA Lifestyle	AA制生活	He Qi	
2012	We Love You, Mr. Jin	金太狼的幸福生活	Mi Xiaomi	
2014	Accoucheur	产科男医生	Qian Xiaoxiao	
2014	Swords of Legends	古剑奇谭	Han Xiuning	Cameo
2016	A Detective Housewife	煮妇神探	Gou Jixiang	
2017	Guardian of Beauty	守护丽人	Lin Jiayi	
2017	Boy Hood	我们的少年时代	An Mi	
2019	The Liar Hunter	读心	Yao Yao	
TBA	Love Me & Convince Me	你这么爱我，我可要当真了	Yang Wujin	

== Discography ==
=== Albums ===
Year	English title	Chinese title	Notes/Ref.
2005	My Naughty Angel	我的淘气天使	
2008	Oriental Beauty	东方美	

=== Singles ===
Year	English title	Chinese title	Album	Notes
2010	"Falling Flowers"	落花	Beauty World OST	
2012	Jin Tai Lang loves Mi Xiaomi	金太狼爱米小米	We Love You, Mr. Jin OST	
2016	"Doll With Many Faces"	多面娇娃	Housewife Detective OST	with Jia Nailiang

== Awards and nominations ==
Year	Award	Category	Nominated work	Result	Ref.
1998	35th Golden Horse Awards	Best Actress	Xiu Xiu: The Sent Down Girl	Won	
1999	16th Festival du Film de Paris	Best Actress	Xiu Xiu: The Sent Down Girl	Won	
1999	1st Deauville Asian Film Festival	Best Actress	Xiu Xiu: The Sent Down Girl	Won	
2006	1st Romania International Film Festival	Best Actress	About Love	Won	
2008	13th Busan International Film Festival	New Star Award	—N/a	Nominated	
2012	8th Huading Awards	Best Actress	My Mother and My Mother-in-Law	Won	
