= List of Chinese films of 1998 =

A list of mainland Chinese films released in 1998:

Title	Director	Cast	Genre	Notes
Be There or Be Square	Feng Xiaogang	Ge You, Xu Fan	Romantic comedy	
Genghis Khan	Fu Sai, Mai Lisi		Historical/Biographical	
Icespeed	Hu Xueyang		Drama/Sports	
Mr. Zhao	Lü Yue	Shi Jingming	Drama	Golden Leopard winner at the 1999 Locarno Film Festival
Once Upon a Time in Shanghai	Peng Xiaolian		Drama	
Restless	Jule Gilfillan	Catherine Kellner, Josh Lucas, David Wu, Geng Le	Romance	Chinese-American co-production
Rhapsody of Spring	Teng Wenji		Drama	
So Close to Paradise	Wang Xiaoshuai		Drama	Also known as Ruan's Song and screened at Cannes
Steal Happiness	Yang Yazhou	Feng Gong	Comedy	Also known as A Tree or A Tree in the House
Sun Bird	Wang Xueqi, Yang Lipin	Wang Xueqi, Yang Liping	Drama	
A Time to Remember	Ye Daying	Todd Babcock; Leslie Cheung, Mei Ting	Romantic drama	
Xiu Xiu: The Sent Down Girl	Joan Chen			Entered into the 48th Berlin International Film Festival

== See also ==
- 1998 in China
