= Su Lin =

Su Lin (or Su-Lin) may refer to:

- Su-Lin Young (1911–2008), Chinese American explorer of the Himalayas
- Either of two giant pandas named after the explorer:
  - Su Lin (1930s giant panda), first live giant panda brought to the United States
  - Su Lin (giant panda, born 2005), giant panda born at the San Diego Zoo
