= Root and branch =

Root and branch may refer to:

- Root and Branch Men
- Root and Branch petition, presented on December 11, 1640

== See also ==
- Roots and Branches (disambiguation)
