= Jong Lin =

Taiwanese cinematographer

Lin Liang-chung 林良忠
- Occupation: Cinematographera
- Father: Lin Tsan-ting

Lin Liang-chung (Chinese: 林良忠; pinyin: Lín Liángzhōng), also credited as Jong Lin, is a Taiwanese-born cinematographer. He is best known for his contributions to several of director Ang Lee's early films. Lin collaborated with prominent directors in mainland China and internationally, including serving as cinematographer for Gurinder Chadha in the British film Bend It Like Beckham. He is sometimes credited as "Josh Lin".

== Filmography ==
Year	English title	Chinese title	Director	Notes
1992	Pushing Hands	推手	Ang Lee	
1993	The Wedding Banquet	喜宴	Ang Lee	
1994	Eat Drink Man Woman	飲食男女	Ang Lee	
1998	Once Upon a Time in Shanghai	上海纪事	Peng Xiaolian	
1998	My Rice Noodle Shop	桂林荣记	Xie Yan	
2000	What's Cooking?	NA	Gurinder Chadha	
2001	Red Persimmons	满山红柿	Shinsuke Ogawa; Peng Xiaolian	
2002	Bend It Like Beckham	NA	Gurinder Chadha	
2005	Sunflower	向日葵	Zhang Yang	Best Cinematography at the San Sebastián International Film Festival
2005	Season of the Horse		Ning Cai	Best Cinematography at the Durban International Film Festival
2006	Shanghai Rumba	上海伦巴	Peng Xiaolian	
2006	The Road	芳香之旅	Zhang Jiarui	
2006	Blind Mountain	盲山	Li Yang	
