= Once Upon a Time in Shanghai =

Once Upon a Time in Shanghai could refer to:

- Once Upon a Time in Shanghai (1998 film), a 1998 Chinese film by Peng Xiaolian
- Once Upon a Time in Shanghai (2014 film), a 2014 Hong Kong film by Wong Ching-po
- Once Upon a Time in Shanghai (TV series), a 1996 Hong Kong TV series
