= Paul Pape =

American actor

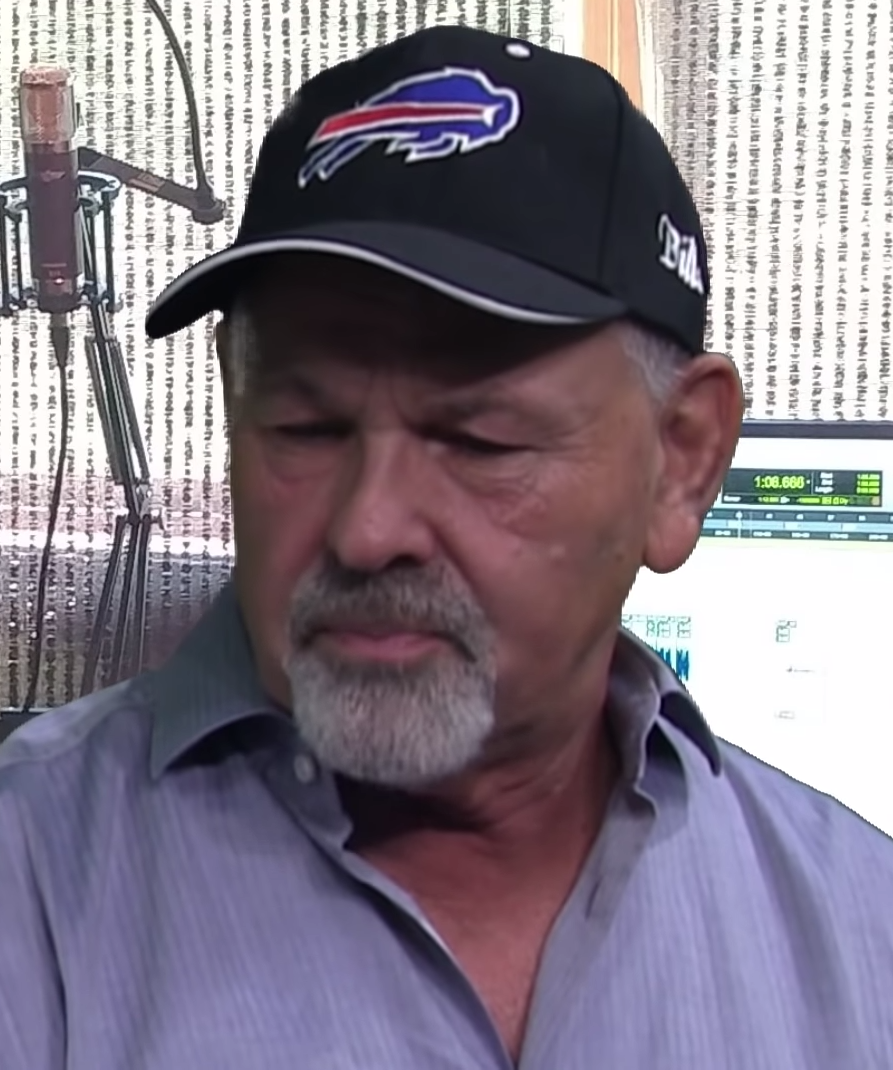
- Pape in 2018
- Born: July 17, 1952 (age 74); Rochester, New York, U.S.
- Occupation: Actor
- Years active: 1977–present

Paul Pape (born July 17, 1952) is an American actor. He is known for the role of Double J in the 1977 film Saturday Night Fever. Post Saturday Night Fever, he has appeared in over 20 films. He also played The Interrogator in the 2006 Playstation 2 game Black.

== Filmography ==
=== Film ===
- Bolt - Man (voice)
- Cats & Dogs - Wolf Blitzer (voice)
- Chicken Little - Fire Chief (voice)
- China: The Panda Adventure - Bill Harkness Voice-over (voice)
- Dragon Nest: Warriors' Dawn - Blacksmith and Kuke (voice)
- Frozen - Crowd Member #1 (voice)
- Incredibles 2 - Additional Voices (voice)
- Monsters vs. Aliens - Soldiers (voice)
- Missing Link - New Worlder (voice)
- Osmosis Jones - Male Red Blood Cell #2 (voice)
- Saturday Night Fever - Double J
- Tangled - Man #4 (voice)
- The Desperate Hour - Lyft Driver
- The Emoji Movie - Additional Voices (voice)
- The Tale of Despereaux - Man in crowd (voice)
- The Wild - Man (voice)
- Wreck-It Ralph - Man at Arcade (voice)

=== Television ===
- Angie - Vinnie Visicio
- Caprica - Rhetoric Host #2
- Family - Clyde
- GameStar: Die Redaktion - Lt. Jack M. Keller
- Hagen - Stewart
- Hart to Hart - Burt Kroll
- Journeyman - Julius
- Resurrection Blvd. - Detective Wilson
- The Man in the High Castle - Film Narrator (voice)
- Wanda at Large - Voiceover
