= Shi Guangnan =

Chinese composer (1940–1990)

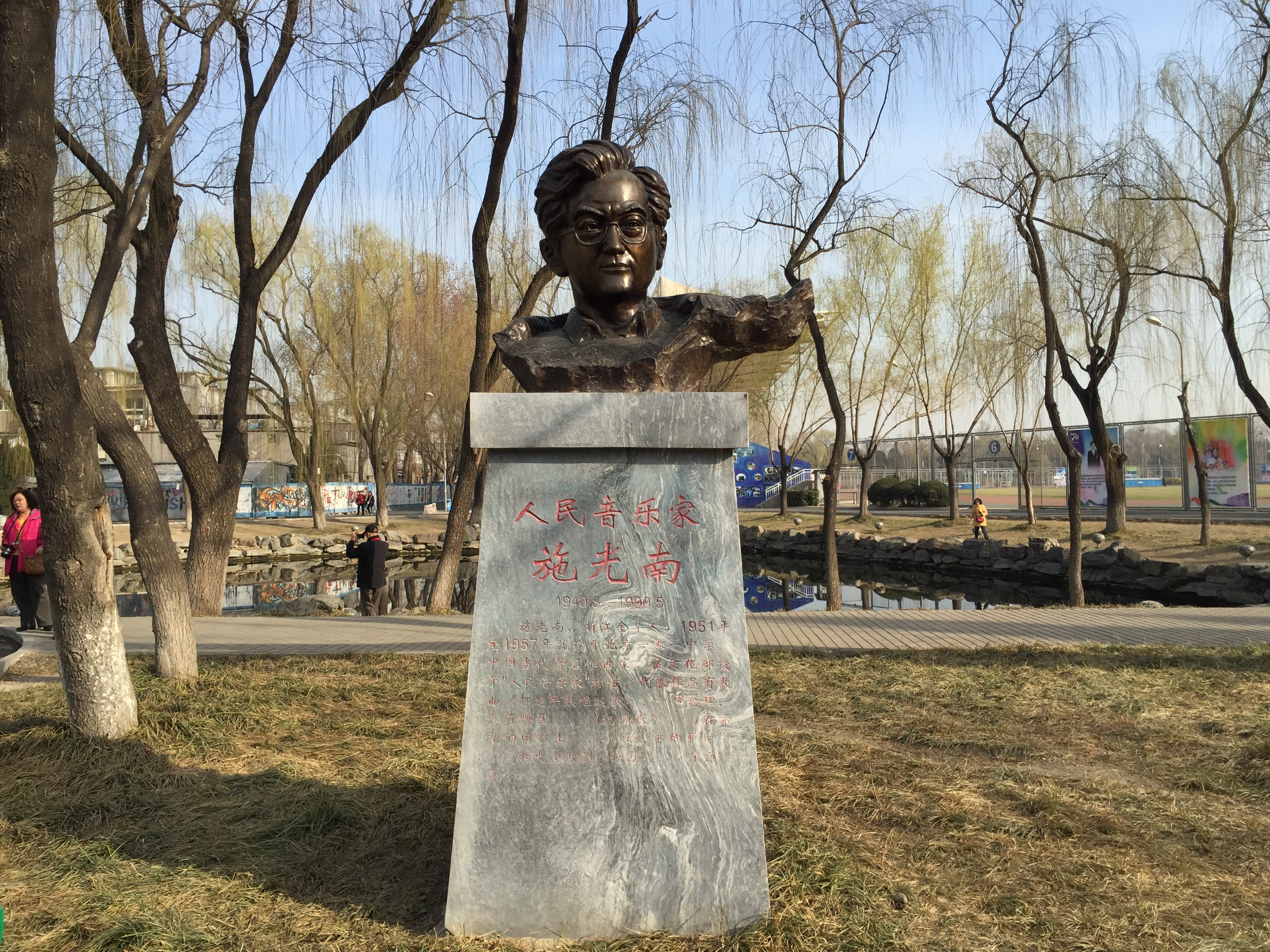
The statue of Shi Guangnan in Beijing 101 Middle School

Shi Guangnan (Chinese: 施光南; August 22, 1940 in Chongqing Municipality, China – May 2, 1990) was a Chinese composer, best known for his patriotic and nationalistic songs from the Cultural Revolution era that combined traditional melodies with westernized accompaniment.

== Biography ==
He attended the middle school division of the Central Conservatory of Music in Beijing and graduated with a degree in composition from the Tianjin Conservatory in 1964, whereupon he was assigned to the Tianjin Dance Theater. In 1985 he was elected as vice-chairman of the Chinese Musicians' Association and composed more than 100 works during his 20-year career. He lived in Jinhua, Zhejiang. He died of a cerebral hemorrhage. The 1998 Chinese film Rhapsody of Spring directed by Teng Wenji is a slightly fictionalized portrait of Shi (called Zhao Liming in the film). The film features a number of Shi's songs.

== Works ==
His songs include "In Hope Field" (在希望的田野上), "Toasts Song" (祝酒歌), "If You Must Know I" (假如你要认识我), "Turfan's Grape Was Ripe" (吐鲁番的葡萄熟了), "Has Lifted Up High the Asian Games Torch" (高举起亚运会的火炬, 11th session of Asian Games's meeting song), "Hits Hand Drum To Sing Song" (打起手鼓唱起歌), "Premier Zhou, Where You Were At" (周总理，您在哪里), "Under Moonlight Wind at the End Bamboo" (月光下的风尾竹), and "Pure White Feather Send Affection" (洁白的羽毛寄深情).

He also composed many operas, ballets, Beijing operas, and other large-scale works, including two full Chinese-language western-style operas; Shangshi (伤逝; based on Lu Xun's story "Mourning" or "Grieve for the Dead") composed in 1981 to commemorate the 100th anniversary of the birth of Lu Xun, and Qu Yuan (屈原, 1990), as well as the ballet Hundred Snake Biographies (百蛇传).
