= Judith Mayne =

American academic (born 1948)

- Born: February 26, 1948 (age 78); Pennsylvania, U.S.
- Partner: Terry Moore
- Awards: Guggenheim Fellowship (2008)

Academic background
- Education: Indiana University of Pennsylvania; University at Buffalo
- Thesis: The Ideologies of Metacinema (1975)

Academic work
- Sub-discipline: French film; Feminist film theory
- Institutions: Paris Diderot University; University of Wisconsin–Milwaukee; Ohio State University

Judith Mayne (born February 26, 1948) is an American academic who specializes in French film and feminist film theory. A 2008 Guggenheim Fellow, she has written eight books: Private Novels, Public Films (1988), Kino and the Woman Question (1989), The Woman at the Keyhole (1990), Cinema and Spectatorship (1993), Directed by Dorothy Arzner (1994), Framed: Lesbians, Feminists, and Media Culture (2000), Claire Denis (2005), and Le Corbeau (2006). She is professor emerita of French at Ohio State University, where she had worked for several decades.

== Biography ==
Mayne was born on February 26, 1948, in Pennsylvania. She attended Indiana University of Pennsylvania, where she got a BA in 1970, and the University at Buffalo, where she got an MA in 1972 and a PhD in 1975. Her doctoral dissertation was titled The Ideologies of Metacinema.

After working as a lecturer of English (1972–1973) at Paris Diderot University, Mayne worked at the University of Wisconsin–Milwaukee, where she was a lecturer of comparative literature and French, as well as a film specialist at the Center for Twentieth-Century Studies. In 1976, she moved to Ohio State University, where she started out as assistant professor; she was promoted to associate professor in 1982 and full professor in 1990, eventually becoming professor emerita. She worked as acting director for Ohio State's Center for Women's Studies from 1986 to 1995. In 2003, she was appointed Distinguished Humanities Professor at Ohio State.

Mayne specializes in French film and feminist film theory. She has written eight books: Private Novels, Public Films (1988), Kino and the Woman Question (1989), The Woman at the Keyhole (1990), Cinema and Spectatorship (1993), Directed by Dorothy Arzner (1994), Framed: Lesbians, Feminists, and Media Culture (2000), Claire Denis (2005), and her titular monograph of the 1943 horror film Le Corbeau (2006). In 2008, she was awarded a Guggenheim Fellowship to write a historical study on the work of Continental Films.

Mayne once starred in a video named Judith Mayne Reads Soap Magazines, produced by Paper Tiger Television, the Wexner Center for the Arts, and Adams Community Television. Mayne appeared in the 2013 documentary film Golden Gate Girls.

Mayne's partner is Terry Moore.

== Bibliography ==
- Private Novels, Public Films (1988)
- Kino and the Woman Question (1989)
- The Woman at the Keyhole (1990)
- Cinema and Spectatorship (1993)
- Directed by Dorothy Arzner (1994)
- Framed: Lesbians, Feminists, and Media Culture (2000)
- Claire Denis (2005)
- Le Corbeau (2006)
