= Tianjin Conservatory of Music =

Music school in Tianjin, China

The Tianjin Conservatory of Music (Chinese: 天津音乐学院; pinyin: Tiānjiīn Yīnyuè Xuéyuán) is a university in Tianjin, China, under the municipal government. It was founded in 1958 as one of nine conservatories of music in China.

== Notable alumni ==
- Shi Guangnan, composer (1940-1990)
- Jie Ma, pipa musician now based in the US
