= China: The Panda Adventure =

2001 film by Robert M. Young

- Directed by: Robert M. Young
- Starring: Maria Bello
- Music by: Randy Edelman
- Release date: June 9, 2001
- Running time: 48 minutes
- Country: United States
- Language: English

China: The Panda Adventure is a 2001 film directed by Robert M. Young and based on the true story of the expedition of Ruth Harkness, who brought the first live giant panda to the United States. It stars Maria Bello and Yu Xia.

== Plot ==
Set in 1936 China, Ruth Harkness has come to settle the affairs of her husband, Bill, who died while observing the rare and unstudied panda bear. His journal describes the panda as shy and docile, while great white hunter Dak Johnson describes them as ferocious beasts. This intrigues her, and she sets off to retrace Bill's steps and save the pandas from Johnson. She encounters many obstacles, both natural and created by Johnson.

== Cast ==
- Maria Bello as Ruth Harkness
- Yu Xia as Quentin Young
- Xander Berkeley as Dakar Johnston
- Paul Pape as Bill Harkness
- Bill Hayes as Narrator
