= Wei Shiyu =

Chinese filmmaker, film producer, writer and professor

Wei Shiyu Louisa
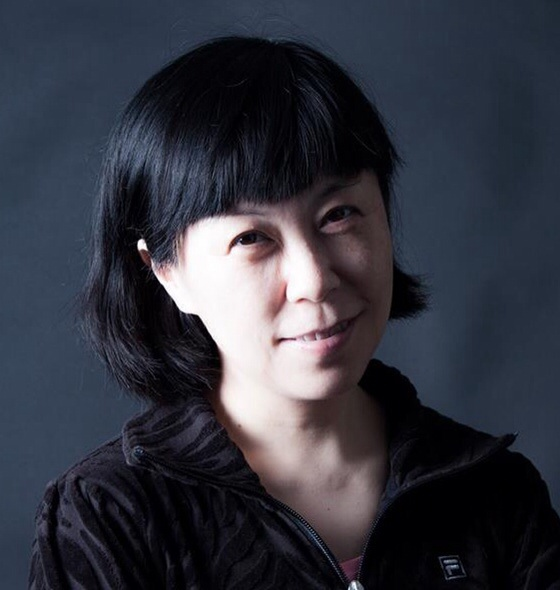
- Filmmaker S. Louisa Wei
- Born: Wei, Shiyu Louisa; Dongying, Shandong
- Occupations: Filmmaker, professor
- Known for: Storm under the Sun (2009), Golden Gate Girls (2014), Havana Divas (2018), A Life in Six Chapters (2022)

S. Louisa Wei (simplified Chinese: 魏时煜; traditional Chinese: 魏時煜; pinyin: Wèi Shíyù; born in Dongying, Shandong) (also credited as Louisa Wei) is a Chinese filmmaker, film producer, writer and professor based in Hong Kong.

== Early life and education ==
Louisa Wei was born in Dongying City of Shandong Province, but grew up in Xi'an. Her father was from one of the prominent families of the early 20th century in Fuzhou City of Fujian Province. The Wei family has one of the earliest overseas students of China, Wei Han (魏瀚 1851–1929), who studied ship building in France from 1875 to 1879 and was the earliest masters of ship building in China. Such a tradition of sending children to study overseas has continued over several generations in the Wei families. Wei studied comparative literature and film in Canada from 1992 to 1999, receiving her MA from Carleton University in 1994 and PhD from University of Alberta in 2002. After working in Japan for two years, Wei moved to Hong Kong and has been since teaching in School of Creative Media, City University of Hong Kong. She became a member of Hong Kong Director's Guild in 2018, and a member of Hong Kong Film Critic Association in 2024.

== Film works ==
Wei began making documentaries in 2003. In February 2006, she made her first music documentary, Cui Jian: Rocking China, a 35-minute video in retrospection of Cui Jian’s performances from 1986 to 2005. The video was co-produced by Blue Queen Cultural Communicated Ltd. and EMI Music and broadcast on Channel 13 of Cable TV Hong Kong on 3 and 4 June 2006. She has continued to film Cui Jian to the present time and a film titled Red Rock is in post-production.

In July 2007, she made her first feature documentary A Piece of Heaven: Primary Documents, a rather personal documentation of her very first documentary experience with Professor Situ Zhaodun of Beijing Film Academy. This film follows Situ's teaching of Hong Kong students in 2003 and 2006, but meanwhile constructs a brief biography of Situ through his family history. Shanghai-based director Peng Xiaolian speaks very highly of the work, calling it "lyrical prose of a family history shared by many in China, and a work with depth about the very concept of documentation through puzzle pieces of documentary history.”

Between 2003 and 2009, Wei co-produced, co-wrote, and co-directed a documentary with Shanghai-based director Xiaolian Peng titled Storm Under the Sun. The film received IDFA Bertha Fund 2003 for script development and IDFA Bertah Fund 2004 for production, and the 2007 version premiered at IDFA.. The documentary has both an English and Chinese version with the same running time of 136 minutes, which was premiered at The 33rd Hong Kong International Film Festival, immediately attracting critical attention.. The film focuses on the 1955 national campaign initiated by Chairman Mao Zedong against Hu Feng, a leading literary critic at the time. Storm Under the Sun is the first film representation of the case, which was a direct cause of the Anti-Rightest Movement two years later and still has a profound influence on Chinese intellectuals today. The film is a political saga with historical newsreel footages, woodcut prints and cartoons, authentic interviews and stylized animations. The film is in the library collections of dozens of universities worldwide. The film was named as one of the best independent documentaries made in Hong Kong by scholars like Ian Aitken and Mike Ingham, and discussed in details in their book titled Hong Kong Documentary Film. The film was recently exhibited at Documentary Film Series "Turn It On: China on Film, 2000–2017" at Guggenheim Museum for ten weeks from 13 October 2017. This exhibition is curated by Ai Weiwei and Wang Fen.

From early 2009 to 2013, Wei collaborated with veteran Hong Kong filmmaker and critic Law Kar on a feature documentary titled Golden Gate Girls (a.k.a. Golden Gate Silver Light), which made its world premiere at the 37th Hong Kong International Film Festival on 1 April 2013. This work reflects the life and times of Esther Eng, Southern China's first woman director, who is a San Francisco native. The film immediately received a positive review from The Hollywood Reporter, and another report in this trade magazine of Hollywood claims that a film producer is inspired by the documentary and hopes to make a feature film around Esther Eng.

Golden Gate Girls traveled to many film festivals and international conferences, and Wei is recognized as a pioneer in documenting the once lost history of Esther Eng. As a researcher in Chinese cinema, she also contributed entries of Esther Eng and Pu Shunqing — China's first female scriptwriter – to the Women Film Pioneer Project hosted by Columbia University.

Wei made a TV documentary for RTHK in 2016 titled Wang Shiwei: The Buried Writer, which was first aired on 25 December 2016. The book was the winner of Distinguished Publishing Award (Literature and Fiction category) at The First Hong Kong Publishing Biennial Award and received positive reviews.

In 2018, Wei completed another documentary titled Havana Divas, which also documents a part of overseas Chinese history. Havana Divas and Golden Gate Girls have several shared characters: Esther Eng, Siu Yin Fei, Franco Yuen, Wu Chin-lee, and Danny Li Kei Fung. The film focuses on two Cuban ladies, Caridad Amaran (1931–2024) and Georgina Wong (1929–), who learned the art of Cantonese opera in Havana in the 1940s and toured around the country to perform. The film has been showing in Hong Kong since 11 February 2018 and is still going around the film festival circuit. It is a rare piece that brings together a Chinese art and two Cuban families, and a story shared by many immigrant families in Central and South Americas.

In 2019, Wei made a TV documentary titled Writing 10000 Miles for RTHK in its 2019 "Outstanding Chinese Writers" series, which was first aired on 13 January 2019. The episode, together with other episodes in the series, was awarded No. 4 in 2019's Hong Kong TV Appreciation Index.

In 2022, Wei's fourth feature documentary titled A Life in Six Chapters, premiered at Singapore Chinese Film Festival, 2022. Multiple scholars and journalists endorsed the quality and significance of this work, which has been screened in six Hong Kong universities.

Wei also has credits as a scriptwriter for two feature films released in 2007: Susie Au's Ming Ming and Xiao Feng's Gun of Mercy. She has also translated many feature film scripts for films during their productions. This list includes Mongol (2008), Lust, Caution (2007), Curse of the Golden Flower (2006), and Fearless (2006) among other films in production.

== Selected publications ==
=== Books ===
- Women's Film: Dialogue with Chinese and Japanese Female Directors 對話中日女導演 (co-authored with Yang Yuanying), Shanghai (China Eastern U.P), 2009.
- Animate! 開始學動畫 (co-authored with Karen MacCain), Beijing (Science and Technology Press), 2010.
- Esther Eng: Cross-ocean Filmmaking and Women Pioneers 霞哥傳奇：跨洋電影與女性先鋒 (co-authored with Law Kar), Hong Kong (Chung Wah Books), 2016.
- Cinema East and West 東西方電影 (Expanded Edition), Hong Kong (City University of Hong Kong Press), 2016.
- Wang Shiwei: A Reform in Thinking 王實味：文藝整風與思想改造, Hong Kong (City University of Hong Kong Press), 2016.
- Hu Feng: Poetic Ideal, Political Storm 胡風：詩人理想與政治風暴, Hong Kong (City University of Hong Kong Press), 2017.
- Wang Fanxi: A Revolutionary in Exile 王凡西：他山之石與流放之旅, Hong Kong (City University of Hong Kong Press), 2026.

== Honors and awards ==
- Closing Film, Women Make Waves International Film Festival, 2013.
- The Intra-Cultral Spotlight Award, The 2nd Washington DC Chinese Film Festival, 2014.
- The Tenth Hong Kong Book Award in 2017.
- The Distinguished Publishing Award, Fiction and Literature Category, The First Hong Kong Biannual Publishing Price, 2017.
- Closing Film, Life Is Art Film Festival, 2018.
