= Roots and Branches =

Roots and Branches may refer to:

- Roots and Branches (The Dillards album), 1972 album by The Dillards
- Roots and Branches (Robin Trower album), 2013 album by Robin Trower
- Roots and Branches (film), a film directed by Yu Zhong
- Roots and Branches, a 2007 book of essays by the Tolkien scholar Tom Shippey
