= Liu Gansan =

Peking opera artist (1817–1894)

- Born: Liu Baoshan; August 8, 1817; Tianjin, Zhili, Qing Empire
- Died: August 10, 1894 (aged 77); Beijing, Zhili, Qing Empire
- Occupation: Peking opera performer
- Known for: Chou roles

Chinese name
- Traditional Chinese: 劉趕三
- Simplified Chinese: 刘赶三
Transcriptions
Standard Mandarin
- Hanyu Pinyin: Liú Gǎnsān

Liu Baoshan
- Traditional Chinese: 劉寶山
- Simplified Chinese: 刘宝山
Transcriptions
Standard Mandarin
- Hanyu Pinyin: Liú Bǎoshān

Liu Baoshan (8 August 1817 – 10 August 1894), better known by his stage name Liu Gansan, was a Qing dynasty Peking opera artist based in Beijing, who specialized in Chou roles, or clowns. He was well known for playing ugly women and making ad-lib comments in his roles to poke fun at the powerful. He was from Tianjin.

Once, when he was performing in the Forbidden City before Empress Dowager Cixi and the Guangxu Emperor, he made a joke to remind the empress dowager that the emperor was standing without a seat. On another occasion, he ridiculed Prince Dun, Prince Gong, and Prince Chun. He received a beating because of it.

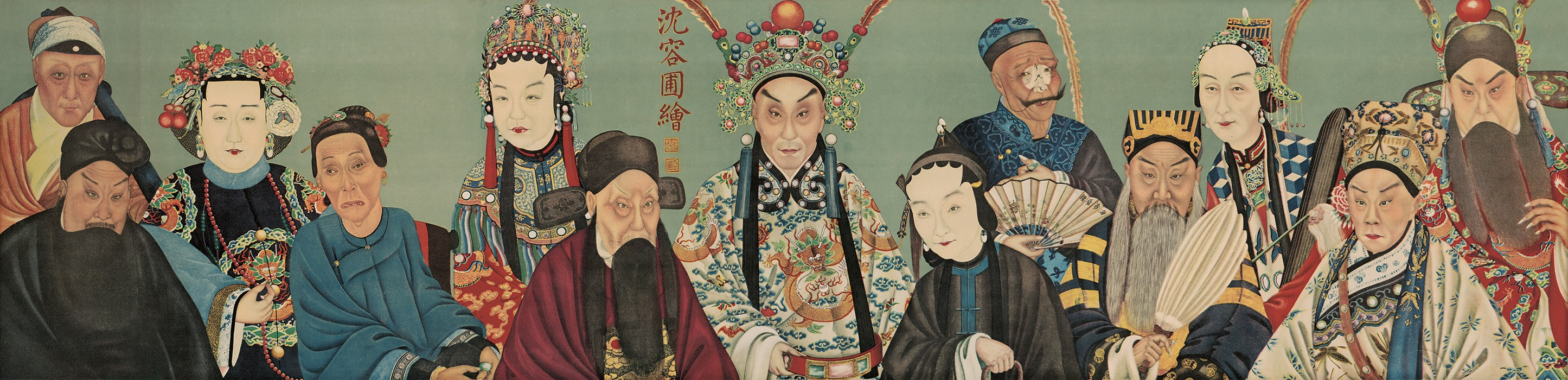
"Thirteen Masters of the Tongzhi and Guangxu Reigns" (同光十三絕), a late Qing dynasty painting by Shen Rongpu (沈容圃). Liu Gansan is 4th from left, dressed in the role of Madam Hu, an old peasant woman.

== In popular culture ==
Actor Xia Yu starred as Liu Gansan in the 2002 comedy TV series The Best Clown Under Heaven (天下第一丑).
