= Entering a New Era =

- Traditional Chinese: 風再起時
- Simplified Chinese: 风再起时
- Hanyu Pinyin: Fēng Zài Qǐ Shí
- Genre: Period
- Written by: Zhang Qiang
- Directed by: Fu Ning
- Starring: Lu Yi; Yuan Quan
- Country of origin: China
- Original language: Mandarin
- No. of seasons: 1
- No. of episodes: 50

Production
- Executive producer: Wang Weiyi
- Production locations: Huzhou, Zhejiang
- Production companies: Hangzhou Jiayi Television Media Ltd; Huoerguosi Youqing Light Industry Co., Ltd.

Original release
- Network: Hunan Television
- Release: November 5, 2018

Entering a New Era (Chinese: 风再起时) is a 2018 Chinese romantic comedy directed by Fu Ning and starring Lu Yi and Yuan Quan. It aired on Hunan Television starting November 5, 2018.

== Synopsis ==
The series focuses on the life of a former soldier-turned-entrepreneur Fang Bangyan in the wave of China's reform and opening-up launched in 1978 by Deng Xiaoping.

== Cast ==
=== Main ===
- Lu Yi as Fang Bangyan, an ambitious ex-serviceman who self-learn English and German, and becomes an entrepreneur.
- Yuan Quan as He Xiaoying, born into in a family of officials, Fang's wife.

=== Supporting ===
- Zhu Yuchen as Kang Ning
- Xu Honghao as He Youling
- Liu Tingzuo as Lin Yun
- Wang Weiwei as Liang Yue
- Han Tongsheng as He Zhengqing
- Ding Yongdai as Fang Xiaowu
- Zhang Lingxin as He Xiaoyan
- Wu Mian as Zheng Lan
- Wu Gang as Hou Bingzhong
- Chang Chen-kuang as Zhang Wei
- Wang Weiyi as Fang Bangyun
- Zhang Tong as Lin Shuzhen
- Tong Chenjie as Gu Pan
- Yue Xiuqing as Qin Fang
- Liu Yi as Tao Ran
- Tan Kai as Xiu Qi
- Li Xinbo as Fang Ling
- Zhang Haoyue as Zhao Feipeng

== Soundtrack ==
No.	Title	Lyrics	Music	Singer(s)	Length
1.	"Song of Love (爱歌)" (Opening theme)	Ma Shangyou	Ma Shangyou; He Rui	Li Xiaodong

== Production ==
Production started in April 2018 and ended in August of the same year.

The TV series is a collaboration between Lu Yi and Yuan Quan after six years in the Chinese-South Korean coproduction My Ex-wife's Wedding.
