= Golden Gate Girls =

2013 Hong Kong film by S. Louisa Wei

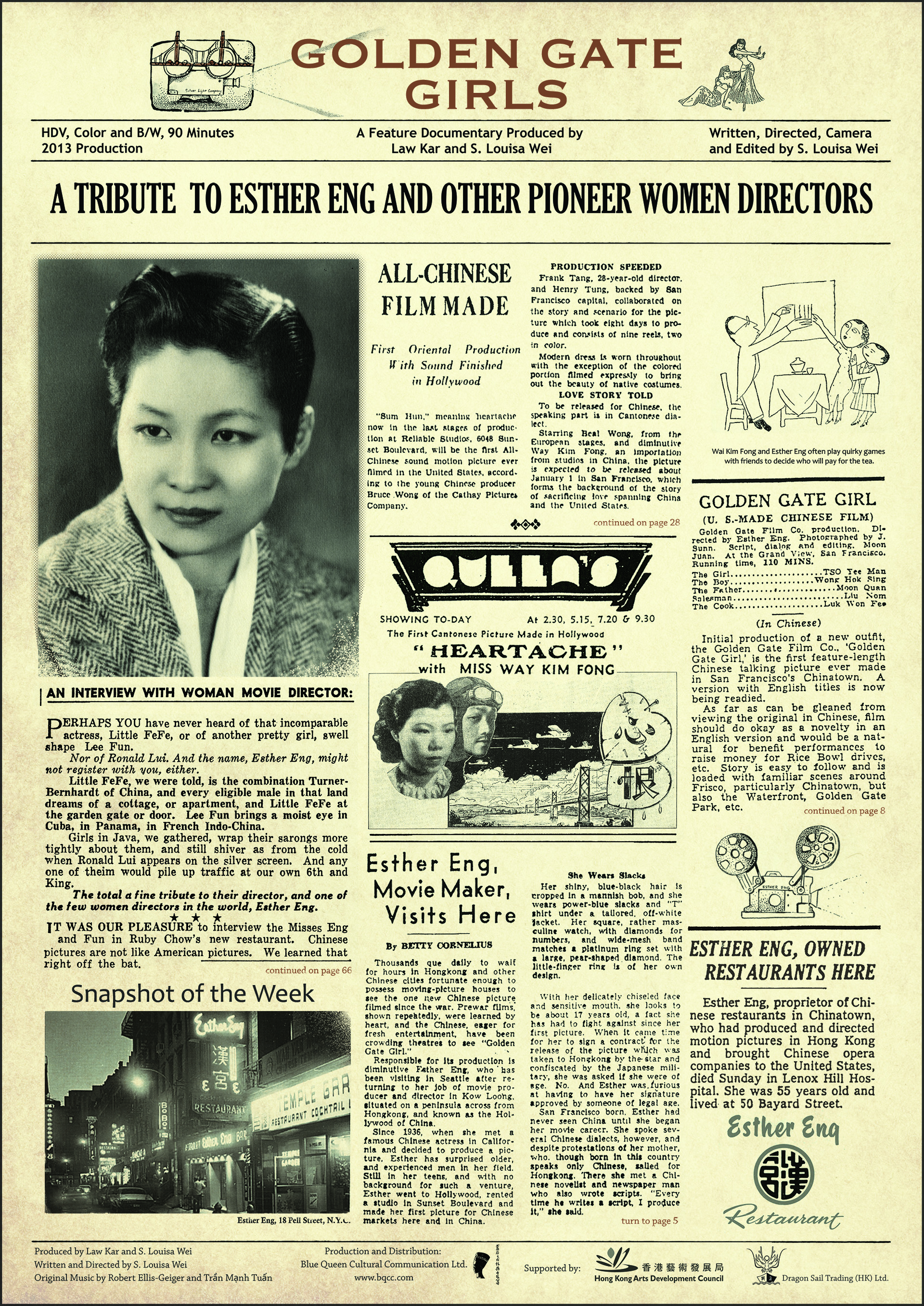
- Poster of the 2013 documentary
- Chinese: 金門銀光夢
- Directed by: S. Louisa Wei
- Written by: S. Louisa Wei
- Produced by: Law Kar; S. Louisa Wei
- Starring: Siu Yin Fei, Margareta Ma, Chin-lee Wu, Danny Li, Sally Ng, Law Kar, Judith Mayne, Graham Hodges, Todd McCarthy, Kenneth Kwong, Tam Yong-wai, Genevieve Lau
- Narrated by: Stephanie Han
- Cinematography: Melanie Wong; Jeff Hu; Max Willis
- Edited by: S. Louisa Wei
- Music by: Robert Ellis-Geiger; Trần Mạnh Tuấn
- Production company: Blue Queen Cultural Communication Ltd.
- Distributed by: Women Make Movies
- Release dates: 1 April 2013 (Hong Kong International Film Festival); 24 September 2014
- Running time: 90 minutes
- Country: Hong Kong
- Languages: English and Cantonese

Golden Gate Girls is a 2013 documentary film focusing on the life and works of Esther Eng (1914-1970), once honored as the first woman director of Southern China. She crossed boundaries of both gender and culture by making Cantonese language films for Chinese audiences during and after WWII. She was in fact the only woman directing feature-length films in America after Dorothy Arzner's retirement in 1943 and before Ida Lupino began directing in 1949. After her film career, she pioneered in establishing fine dining Chinese restaurants in New York City. She left her mark in both the Chinese and English press, enabling director S. Louisa Wei to recover some of her lost stories. Clips from her two extant films, stills from her eight other motion pictures, photos from her six albums, newsreels of San Francisco as she saw them, as well as hundreds of archival images are collected to present her life and work.

To pay tribute to Esther Eng, this documentary borrows the title of Eng's 1941 picture Golden Gate Girl, and the making of the film was also included in the documentary.

== Production ==
The film is produced by Blue Queen Cultural Communication Ltd., a Hong Kong-based production company. Writer/Director S. Louisa Wei assisted Hong Kong director Susie Au in the production of Ming Ming, co-writing the script and helping the director obtain funds for the project. In 2012, she completed the script for Golden Gate Girls (a.k.a. Golden Gate, Silver Light) in both English and Chinese. Co-Producer Law Kar also acts as script consultant for the project and appears in the film.

== Reception ==
The film's earlier version, titled Golden Gate Silver Light, was first shown in the 37th Hong Kong International Film Festival. The film was reviewed by Elizabeth Kerr of The Hollywood Reporter, who writes: "Documentary filmmaker S. Louisa Wei sheds some much-needed light on a hidden piece of Hollywood, Hong Kong, women’s and Asian-American film history. One of [the film’s] strengths is its seamless ability to weave history, Sino-U.S. relations and social standards together to allow for inference and context." The film seemed to have evoked interests in Hollywood producers to make a bio-pic on the film's main subject, Esther Eng.

The final version of the film, as director S. Louisa Wei reveals to China Daily's Chitralekha Basu, is the ninth and re-titled Golden Gate Girls in English. It was invited to over a dozen international film festivals including CAAM in San Francisco, San Diego Asian Film Festival, and most recently Shanghai International Film Festival. The film was the closing film for Women Make Wave Film Festival in Taiwan in 2013, the opening film for the 2nd Chinese Women's Film Festival in 2014, and the winner of Intra-Cultural Spotlight Award at Washington DC Chinese Film Festival in 2014

The film has received mainly positive reviews from both English and Chinese press. Kevin M. Thomas of San Francisco's The Examiner praised Golden Gate Girls as "more than a loving tribute to [Esther] Eng, set to the most amazing jazz music." He likes the fact that director "Wei also pays tribute to other pioneering and lesbian filmmakers such as Dorothy Arzner, who paved the road for many of our more recent female directors – gay or straight." He also notes that the "90 minute film also is a beautiful refection of early San Francisco, where Eng made a lot of her movies."

== Distribution ==
Women Make Movies is distributing Golden Gate Girls in North America. In Taiwan, the film is distributed by Women's Film Association. Edko Films in Hong Kong has the TV distribution rights for the film in Hong Kong and Macau and already aired the film in its MOVIE MOVIE channel. In Mainland China, the film is distributed by Companion Company.
