= Xia Yu (actor) =

Chinese actor

- Xia at the 2007 Shanghai International Film Festival
- Born: 28 October 1976 (age 50); Qingdao, Shandong, China
- Education: Central Academy of Drama
- Occupation: Actor
- Years active: 1994–present
- Agent: Xia Yu Studio
- Spouse: Yuan Quan (m. 2009)
- Children: 1 daughter (b. 2010)
- Awards: Volpi Cup for Best Actor; 1994 In the Heat of the Sun Golden Horse Awards – Best Actor; 1994 In the Heat of the Sun

Chinese name
- Chinese: 夏雨
Transcriptions
Standard Mandarin
- Hanyu Pinyin: Xià Yǔ
- IPA: [ɕjâ ỳ]

Xia Yu (Chinese: 夏雨; born 28 October 1976) is a Chinese actor. At the age of 18 years, he rose to international prominence after winning the Best Actor award at the Venice Film Festival in 1994 for his leading role in the film In the Heat of the Sun and became the youngest actor to win that award in the history of the Venice Film Festival.

== Biography ==
Xia Yu was born on 28 October 1976 in Qingdao, Shandong Province. His father was once an actor and then became a painter.

Xia was initially discovered by Jiang Wen who cast him in his semi-autobiographical film In the Heat of the Sun (1994). Despite being chosen partly because of his facial resemblance to a young Jiang, Xia's spirited and moving performance as a renegade youth conquered audiences. He was rocketed to international stardom after he won the Best Actor award from the Venice Film Festival (the youngest actor to win that award in the history of the festival), Singapore International Film Festival and Golden Horse Awards.

Xia wanted to study drama after his first film, he was accepted into the Central Academy of Drama. After completing his studies there, Xia remained an active force in Chinese cinema as well as television, appearing in many films and television series. Xia's second film Shadow Magic demonstrated his talent as an actor and earned him a nomination for Best Actor at the Tokyo International Film Festival. His earlier film credits also includes Roots and Branches (2001) and Where Have All the Flowers Gone (2002). Xia's subsequent films, The Law of Romance (2003) won him a Golden Rooster Award for Best Actor and Waiting Alone (2005) earned him Best Actor at the Beijing College Student Film Festival. With five best actor titles at international film festivals, Xia Yu has been named one of the top 4 hottest young actors in China.

Like many of today′s actors in China, Xia Yu also has an extensive TV career, appearing on such shows as Records of Kangxi's Travel Incognito, Classical Romance and Sky Lovers. Most of Xia′s TV roles have been secondary ones until he was cast to star in The Ugliest In the World, where he played Liu Baoshan, a genius of the Qing Dynasty who gave up the opportunity to become an official in order to become a clown.

Aside from local productions, Xia has also starred in two Hollywood films; China: The Panda Adventure (2001) and The Painted Veil (2006). Xia also starred alongside Shilpa Shetty in the Indian-Chinese film The Desire (2010). In 2016, he took on the role of Wong Jack-man in the Bruce Lee biopic Birth of the Dragon, produced by American filmmaker George Nolfi.

In 2017, Xia reunited with Waiting Alone director Dayyan Eng in fantasy comedy film Wished, which became one of the highest-grossing domestic comedy titles for the summer season.

In 2019, it was announced that Xia will play Shen Gongbao in the upcoming fantasy film series Fengshen Trilogy directed by Wuershan. The film is based on the novel Investiture of the Gods.

== Personal life ==
Xia married actress Yuan Quan in 2009, a decade after their first date as students in Central Academy of Drama. They have appeared in 4 films together: The Law of Romance (2003), Waiting Alone (2004), Shanghai Rumba (2006) and Breakup Buddies (2014). Their daughter was born on 31 March 2010.

Xia is an avid skateboarder. He fell in love with skateboarding after watching it in Gleaming the Cube, a popular movie when he was young. He finds time to board whenever he is between sets shooting a film. In 2003, Xia began to ski and loved it. In 2006, Xia won the championship of a snowboarding game in amateur group in Lucerne, Switzerland.

== Filmography ==
=== Film ===
Year	English title	Chinese title	Role	Notes/Ref.
1994	In the Heat of the Sun	阳光灿烂的日子	Ma Xiaojun	
2000	Shadow Magic	西洋镜	Liu Jinglun	
2001	Roots and Branches	我的兄弟姐妹	Qi Tian	
2001	China: The Panda Adventure	—N/a	Quentin Young	
2002	Where Have All the Flowers Gone	那时花开	Gao An	
2003	Cala, My Dog!	卡拉是条狗	Police	
2003	The Law of Romance	警察有约	Zhao Xingan	
2004	My Early Days in France	我的法兰西岁月	Xiao San	
2004	Electric Shadows	电影往事	Mao Dabing	
2004	Bamboo Shoot	自娱自乐	Wang Shengli	
2004	Waiting Alone	独自等待	Chen Wen	
2005	Dragon Squad	猛龙	Luo Zaijun	
2006	Shanghai Rumba	上海伦巴	Ah Chuan	
2006	Sun Plant	太阳花	Boy	Short film
2006	The Painted Veil	面纱	Wu Lien	
2007	Getting Home	落叶归根	Bei Baorong	
2007		江北好人	Zhang Weiyang	
2007	Dangerous Games	棒子老虎鸡	Li Dachun	
2009	Tiny Dust, True Love	寻找微尘	Reporter	Cameo
2010	Life of Sentime	感情生活	Xiao Ke	
2010	Wind Blast	西风烈	Zhang Ning	
2010	The Desire	—N/a	Jai Leang	
2012	Double Trouble	宝岛双雄	Ocean	
2012	The Sino-Japanese War at Sea 1894	一八九四·甲午大海战	Itō Sukeyuki	
2013	Love Deposit	爱情银行	He Muyang	
2013	Christmas Rose	圣诞玫瑰	Xue Zhaowen	
2014	Breakup Buddies	心花路放	Kang Xiaoyu's ex	Cameo
2015	Crazy New Year's Eve	一路惊喜	Zhong Wei	
2015	Romance Out of the Blue	浪漫天降	Lin Zida	
2015	Mojin: The Lost Legend	鬼吹灯之寻龙诀	Big Gold Tooth	
2016	Papa	洛杉矶捣蛋计划	Huang Guolun	
2016	Birth of the Dragon	—N/a	Wong Jack-man	
2017	Wished	反转人生	Ma Fendou	
2018	Goddesses in the Flames of War	那些女人		Cameo
2019	Love Song to the Days Forgone	东北往事之二十年	Mei San	
2019	The Coldest City	红尘1945		
2020	Fengshen Trilogy	封神三部曲	Shen Gongbao	
2022	Breaking Through	我心飞扬	Qin Shan	

=== Television series ===
Year	English title	Chinese title	Role	Notes/Ref.
1994	Temporary Family	临时家庭		Cameo
1998	Records of Kangxi's Travel Incognito	康熙微服私访记	Wo Laiye	
2001	The Best Clown Under Heaven	天下第一丑	Liu Gansan	
2001	Buddha Jumps	佛跳墙	Zhao Baochu	
2002	Sky Lovers	天空下的缘分	Xia Sanlang	
2002	You Light Up My Life	点燃我生命的是你	Huo Ran	
2003	Return of Judge Bao I	包公出巡之龙凤肚兜	Gao Tianyou	
2004	The Thundering Sword	残剑震江湖	Wang Xiaohu	
2004	Classical Romance	经典爱情	Chen Guang	
2004	Bring Your Smile Along	啼笑因缘	Lu Yizhi	
2005	The Vinegar Tribe	醋溜族	Xiao Long	
2005	Falling in Love with a Single-Eyelid Guy	爱上单眼皮男生	Han Zitong	
2006	Waves Washing the Sand	浪淘沙	Ouyang Tong	
2006	The Identity of Friend	以朋友的名义	Luo Jie	
2006	Secret History of Kangxi	康熙秘史	Kangxi	
2007	Justice Department	青天衙门	Rui De	
2008	Firewall 5788	防火墙5788	Tong Jun	
2009	The Innocent Years	我们的八十年代	Yin Yugang	
2009	Great Porcelain Merchant	大瓷商	Tao Jingnan	
2009	The North Wind Blows	北风那个吹	Shuai Hongbin	
2009	The Flying Military Flag	军旗飘扬	Ma Bayi	
2011	Shi Fu	师傅	Xu Feng	
2011	Yang Liu Qing	杨柳青	Yang Liuqing	
2013	The Standing Year	而立之年	Cao Baiwan	
2013	Jinan City is our Hometown	我们这拨人	Yang Ruo	
2018	Operation Moscow	莫斯科行动	Chen Yali	
2018	Mystery of Antiques	古董局中局	Xu Yuan	
2020	Antique Bureau Midgame	古董局中局2	Xu Yuan	
2020	Traditional Chinese Medicine	大中医		

== Awards and nominations ==
Year	Award	Category	Nominated work	Result	Ref.
1994	51st Venice Film Festival	Best Actor	In the Heat of the Sun	Won	
1994	7th Singapore International Film Festival	Best Actor	In the Heat of the Sun	Won	
1996	23rd Golden Horse Awards	Best Actor	In the Heat of the Sun	Won	
2000	5th Changchun Film Festival	Best Actor	Shadow Magic	Nominated	
2000	13th Tokyo International Film Festival	Best Actor	Shadow Magic	Nominated	
2003	23rd Golden Rooster Awards	Best Actor	The Law of Romance	Won	
2004	27th Hundred Flowers Award	Best Actor	The Law of Romance	Nominated	
2005	7th Changchun Film Festival	Best Actor	Electric Shadows	Nominated	
2005	12th Beijing College Student Film Festival	Best Actor	Waiting Alone	Won	
2005	10th Golden Phoenix Awards	Society Award	Waiting Alone	Won	
2006	13th Beijing College Student Film Festival	Most Popular Actor	Shanghai Rumba	Won	
2009	1st Macau International Movie Festival	Best Actor	Life of Sentime	Nominated	
2016	33rd Hundred Flowers Award	Best Supporting Actor	Mojin: The Lost Legend	Nominated	
2018	24th Huading Awards	Best Actor	Operation Moscow	Nominated	
2019	6th The Actors of China Award Ceremony	Best Actor (Web series)	Mystery of Antiques	Nominated	
2019	26th Huading Awards	Best Actor (Modern drama)	Mystery of Antiques	Nominated	
2019	Jinri Toutiao Awards Ceremony	Music Creator of the Year	—N/a	Won	
2020	7th The Actors of China Awards	Best Actor (Web series)	—N/a	Nominated	
