= Shanghai Rumba =

- Film poster
- Traditional Chinese: 上海倫巴
- Simplified Chinese: 上海伦巴
- Hanyu Pinyin: Shànghǎi Lúnbā
- Directed by: Peng Xiaolian
- Written by: Peng Xiaolian
- Produced by: Ren Zhonglun
- Starring: Yuan Quan; Xia Yu
- Cinematography: Jong Lin
- Edited by: Yang Xinyu
- Music by: Pan Guoxing
- Production company: Shanghai Film Group
- Release date: 10 February 2006 (China)
- Running time: 107 minutes
- Country: China
- Languages: Mandarin; Shanghainese

Shanghai Rumba is a 2006 Chinese romance drama film written and directed by Peng Xiaolian, starring the real-life couple Yuan Quan and Xia Yu (before their marriage in 2009). Set in 1940s Shanghai, the story is loosely based on the real love story of film actors Zhao Dan and Huang Zongying, although names have been changed.

== Plot ==
Wanyu (Yuan Quan), a young woman unhappily constrained by the rules of the traditional Chinese society, accidentally meets film star A Chuan (Xia Yu) when she is offered a role in his film. Her life completely changes from that moment on.
