= Yuan Quan =

Chinese actress and singer

- 袁泉
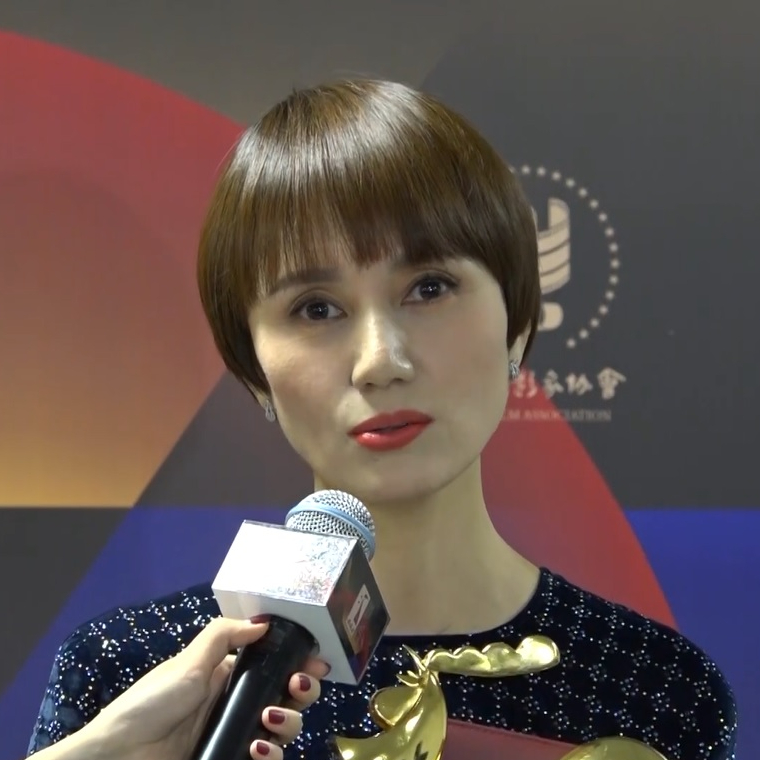
- Yuan in 2020
- Born: 16 October 1977 (age 48); Jingzhou, Hubei, China
- Other name: Yolanda Yuan
- Education: Central Academy of Drama
- Occupations: Actress; singer
- Years active: 1999–present
- Agent: Bona Film Group
- Political party: Chinese Communist Party
- Spouse: Xia Yu (m. 2009)
- Children: 1

Yuan Quan (Chinese: 袁泉; pinyin: Yuán Quán, born 16 October 1977), also known as Yolanda Yuan, is a Chinese actress and singer. She graduated from the Central Academy of Drama where she majored in drama.

== Career ==
Yuan starred in her first film Rhapsody of Spring (1998), which won her the Golden Rooster Award for Best Supporting Actress. Her subsequent films also earned her awards; Once Upon a Time in Shanghai (1998) earned her a nomination for Best Actress at the Golden Rooster Award and A Love of Blueness (2000) brought her the Best Actress trophy at the Beijing College Student Film Festival. In 2002, Yuan won her second Golden Rooster Award for her performance in Pretty Big Feet by Mo Yan, the first film that depicts contemporary western China.

Though Yuan achieved success in films, it is on stage that Yuan has earned most fame and applause. She chose to become a professional drama actress at the National Theater of China after graduation and first attracted the audience and media in the 2001 production of Hurricane. Yuan rose to prominence in 2005 when she starred in Meng Jinghui's musical drama Amber, which was a hit; touring seven cities in Asia and attracting more than 100,000 audiences. In 2006, she starred in Secret Love in Peach Blossom Land by Stan Lai, which won critical acclaim and was voted "Best Stage Drama of 2006". The success of the play led to Yuan's introduction to famous Taiwan musician Yao Qian, who in turn inspired Yuan Quan to start a musical career. In 2007, Yuan released her first album, The Lonely Flower.

Yuan also took on the role of the titular protagonist for the 2009 and 2013 drama production Jane Eyre by the National Center for the Performing Arts. Her performance received acclaim; in an audience poll conducted by the Beijing News, 90% believed that Yuan's Jane did justice to the novel, conveying the character's 'calm, introverted and persistent personality'. Yuan won the China Golden Lion Award for Drama in 2010 and the Plum Blossom Award in 2012; both are considered high honors in theater.

2014 was a successful year for Yuan, who starred in two top-grossing films Breakup Buddies and The Continent.

In 2017, Yuan co-starred in The First Half of My Life, a drama that tells the inspirational story of a housewife-turned-career woman. The drama was a huge hit in China.

== Personal life ==
Yuan Quan was born in a Hui-Han family. She married actor Xia Yu in 2009, a decade after their first got together as students in Central Academy of Drama. They have appeared in 4 films together: The Law of Romance (2003), Waiting Alone (2004), Shanghai Rumba (2006) and Breakup Buddies (2014). Yuan Quan also portrayed a character named Xia Yu in Pretty Big Feet (2002). Their daughter was born on 31 March 2010.

== Filmography ==
=== Film ===
Year	English title	Chinese title	Role	Notes/Ref.
1998	Rhapsody of Spring	春天的狂想	Zhou Xiaomei	
1998	Once Upon a Time in Shanghai	上海纪事	Li Huirong	
2000	A Love of Blueness	蓝色爱情	Liu Yun	
2000	If I Lose You	如果没有爱		
2002	Pretty Big Feet	美丽的大脚	Xia Yu	
2003	The Law of Romance	警察有约	Eyes partner	Cameo
2004	Waiting Alone	独自等待	Xiao Mi	
2006	Shanghai Rumba	上海伦巴	Wan Yu	
2009	Like a Dream	如梦	Yi Ling / Yi Yi	
2010	My Ex-wife's Wedding	跟我的前妻谈恋爱	Yu Xiaohong	
2012	The Last Tycoon	大上海	Ye Zhiqiu	
2013	The White Storm	扫毒	Yuan Ke'er	
2014	Breakup Buddies	心花路放	Kang Xiaoyu	
2014	The Continent	后会无期	Liu Yingying	
2014	The Golden Era	黄金时代	Mei Zhi	
2015	From Vegas to Macau II	澳门风云2	Xiao Ma's wife	
2016	The Deadly Reclaim	危城	Zhou Susu	
2016	The Wasted Times	罗曼蒂克消亡史	Miss Wu	
2019	The Composer	音乐家		
2019	The Captain	中国机长	Bi Nan	
2020	English	英格力士		
2020	Lost in Russia	囧妈		
2020	Fengshen Trilogy	封神三部曲	Queen Jiang	

=== Television series ===
Year	English title	Chinese title	Role	Notes/Ref.
2001		青春不解风情	Bai Ling	
2001		爱情滋味	Zhao Chen	
2002		吕布与貂蝉	Dong Yuan	
2002	The Ripple	旋涡	Xiang Duo	
2002	Love & Sword	有情鸳鸯无情剑	Yuan Juan	
2003		生命因你而美丽	Xia Lan	
2004		天剑群侠	Xian Zi Lu Mu	
2004	The Edge of Love	爱在边缘	Jiang Xinyue	
2005	Perfect	完美	Bai Xuan	
2005	The Proud Twins	小鱼儿与花无缺	Su Ying	
2006	Perfect Summer	完美夏天	Xin Yu	
2006	Romance in the White House	白屋之恋	Yang Lan	
2007		烈爱	Ying Ai	
2007	Flower	花之恋	Wang Jialin	
2008	Indanthrene	阴丹士林	Lin Ruijia	
2014	Walking on the Blade	锋刃	Mo Yanping	
2017	The First Half of My Life	我的前半生	Tang Jing	
2017	Blue Sea Ambition	碧海雄心	Lin Yue	
2018	Entering a New Era	风再起时	He Xiaoying	
2019	Joy of Life	庆余年	Ye Qingmei	Cameo
2019	The Best Partner	精英律师		Cameo
2021	My Best Friend's Story	流金岁月	Xia Qian	
TBA	Challenges at Midlife	落花时节	Ning Yu	

=== Theater ===
Year	English title	Chinese title	Role	Notes
1999	The Butterfly Lovers	梁祝	Zhu Yingtai	
2001	Hurricane	狂飙	An E	
2001	I Have Heard of Love	我听见了爱	Shui Yuantong	
2005–2008	Amber	琥珀	Shen Xiaoyou	
2006	Song of Film	电影之歌	Qing Qing	
2006–2008	Secret Love in Peach Blossom Land	暗恋桃花源	Yun Zhifan	
2009	Jane Eyre	简·爱	Jane Eyre	
2012	To Live	活着	Jia Zhen	
2012	Green Snake	青蛇	Bai Suzhen	

== Discography ==
=== Albums ===
Year	English title	Chinese title	Language	Notes
2007	The Lonely Flower	孤独的花朵	Mandarin	
2008	Short Stay Taipei	Short Stay 台北	Mandarin	
2008	Short Stay Okinawa	Short Stay 冲绳	Mandarin	
2009	Short Stay Beijing	Short Stay 北京	Mandarin	

== Awards and nominations ==
=== Television, Film and Theater ===
Year	Award	Category	Nominated work	Result	Ref.
1999	19th Golden Rooster Awards	Best Actress	Once Upon a Time in Shanghai	Nominated	
1999	19th Golden Rooster Awards	Best Supporting Actress	Rhapsody of Spring	Won	
2001	21st Golden Rooster Awards	Best Actress	A Love of Blueness	Nominated	
2001	8th Beijing College Student Film Festival	Best Actress	A Love of Blueness	Won	
2002	2nd Chinese Film Media Awards	Best Actress	A Love of Blueness	Nominated	
2002	22nd Golden Rooster Award	Best Supporting Actress	Pretty Big Feet	Won	
2003	26th Hundred Flowers Award	Best Supporting Actress	Pretty Big Feet	Won	
2003	9th Huabiao Awards	Outstanding Actress	Pretty Big Feet	Nominated	
2003	9th Golden Phoenix Awards	Society Award	Pretty Big Feet	Won	
2009	46th Golden Horse Awards	Best Leading Actress	Like a Dream	Nominated	
2010	7th China Golden Lion Award for Drama	Performance Award	Jane Eyre	Won	
2011	1st International Theatre Academy Award	Best Performer	Jane Eyre	Won	
2013	26th Plum Blossom Performance Award		Jane Eyre	Won	
2014	32nd Hundred Flowers Award	Best Supporting Actress	The White Storm	Nominated	
2017	8th China Film Director's Guild Awards	Best Actress	The Wasted Times	Nominated	
2017	8th Macau International Television Festival	Best Supporting Actress	The First Half of My Life	Nominated	
2017	10th China TV Drama Awards	Best Actress	The First Half of My Life	Nominated	
2017	10th China TV Drama Awards	Outstanding Leading Actress	The First Half of My Life	Won	
2018	24th Shanghai Television Festival	Best Actress	The First Half of My Life	Nominated	
2018	29th China TV Golden Eagle Award	Best Actress	The First Half of My Life	Nominated	
2018	5th The Actors of China Awards	Best Actress (Sapphire)	The First Half of My Life	Nominated	
2019	6th The Actors of China Awards	Best Actress (Sapphire Category)	Entering a New Era	Won	
2019	11th Macau International Movie Festival	Best Supporting Actress	The Captain	Nominated	
2020	35th Hundred Flowers Awards	Best Supporting Actress	The Captain	Won	
2020	33rd Golden Rooster Awards	Best Supporting Actress	The Captain	Won	
2022	36th Hundred Flowers Awards	Best Actress	Chinese Doctors	Won	
2023	18th Huabiao Awards	Outstanding Actress	The Captain	Nominated	
2023	36th Golden Rooster Awards	Best Supporting Actress	Creation of the Gods I: Kingdom of Storms	Nominated	
2024	37th Hundred Flowers Awards	Best Supporting Actress	Creation of the Gods I: Kingdom of Storms	Nominated	

=== Music ===
Year	Award	Category	Nominated work	Result	Ref.
2007	14th Beijing Pop Music Awards	Golden Hit of 2006	"The Lonely Flower"	Won	
2007	China Collegiate Music Festival	Most Popular Female Singer (Mainland)	—N/a	Won	
2007	14th ERC Chinese Top Ten Awards	Best Music Video	Unknown	Won	
2007	13th China Music Awards	Best Music Video (Mainland)	"An Lian"	Won	
2008	8th Top Chinese Music Awards	Newcomer of the Year	"The Lonely Flower"	Won	
2008	8th Chinese Music Media Awards	Best Newcomer (Mandarin)	"The Lonely Flower"	Won	
2009	16th Beijing Pop Music Awards	Golden Hit of 2008	"Mu Jin Hua"	Won	
2009	9th Top Chinese Music Awards	Best EP	Short Stay Beijing / Short Stay Okinawa	Won	
2010	10th Top Chinese Music Awards	Top 10 Golden Hits	"The Lonely Flower"	Won	
