= Rhapsody of Spring =

- international film poster
- Chinese: 春天的狂想
- Hanyu Pinyin: Chūntiān de Kuángxiǎng
- Directed by: Teng Wenji
- Written by: Teng Wenji; He Ping; Wu Hanqing
- Produced by: Han Sanping
- Starring: Shao Bing; Qu Ying; Yuan Quan
- Cinematography: Zhi Lei
- Edited by: Kong Jinglei
- Music by: Chang Yuhong
- Production companies: China Movie Channel; Beijing Film Studio
- Release date: 1998
- Country: China
- Language: Mandarin

Rhapsody of Spring is a 1998 Chinese drama film directed and co-written by Teng Wenji, based on the life of composer Shi Guangnan (1940–1990). Although the protagonist's name has been changed to "Zhao Liming" to accommodate the dramatized plot, most of the songs featured in the film are unmistakably composed by Shi.

== Awards and nominations ==
- 1999 Beijing College Student Film Festival
  - Won — Best Director (Teng Wenji)
- 1999 Golden Rooster Awards
  - Won — Best Supporting Actress (Yuan Quan)
  - Nominated — Best Film
  - Nominated — Best Director (Teng Wenji)
