= Ruth Harkness =

American fashion designer, socialite, and panda owner

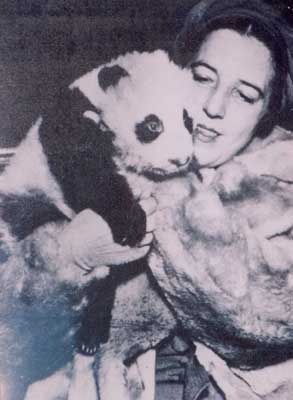
Ruth Harkness returns to the United States with Su-Lin

Ruth Elizabeth Harkness (21 September 1900 – 20 July 1947) was an American fashion designer and socialite who traveled to China in 1936 and brought the first live giant panda to the United States.

Harkness was born in Titusville, Pennsylvania, a daughter of Robert and Mary Ann (née Patterson) McCombs. In 1934, her husband Bill Harkness had travelled to China in search of a panda, but died of throat cancer in Shanghai early in 1936. His widow Ruth, then living in New York City, decided to complete the mission herself.

Harkness traveled to Shanghai, and with the help of a Chinese-American explorer named Quentin Young, and Gerald Russell, a British naturalist, launched her own panda mission. After passing through Chongqing and Chengdu, the team arrived at a mountainous region, where, on 9 November 1936, they found and captured a nine-week-old panda cub. The panda, who they named Su Lin after Young's sister-in-law, was bottle-fed baby formula on the journey back to Shanghai and the United States. Su Lin meant the phrase 'a little bit of something very cute'. Young migrated to the United States in later years and felt he never got credit for his work in finding the panda.

The panda caused a great sensation in the American press and eventually ended up at the Brookfield Zoo in Chicago. The bear is now stuffed and on display at the Chicago Field Museum.

Harkness launched two subsequent expeditions in search of the giant panda. Harkness brought back a second panda, Mei-Mei, in 1937. She did not return with a giant panda on her third and final expedition.

Following her time in China and the success of her book about her adventure with Su Lin, The Baby Giant Panda, Harkness travelled to Peru, where she chronicled her adventures in Pangoan Diary, and Mexico, where she wrote for Gourmet magazine. Harkness' friend was an editor at Gourmet and thus paid her for articles when possible.

She last resided at the Chelsea Hotel in New York City. Harkness was found dead due to alcoholism while staying at the William Penn Hotel in Pittsburgh, Pennsylvania. She was cremated and her ashes were returned to Titusville where they were interred in the Union Cemetery, beside her mother.

An IMAX film, China: The Panda Adventure, was made about her expedition in 2001. In 2016, Lady and the Panda, a theatrical film about Harkness written and directed by Justin Chadwick, was announced as in pre-production. As of 2022, no subsequent updates had been made and the film was still listed as in-development.

== Writing ==
Written by Ruth Harkness:

- The Lady and the Panda: An Adventure, Carrick & Evans, New York, 1938.
- The Baby Giant Panda, Carrick & Evans, New York, 1938.
- Pangoan Diary, 1942. A treatise on Peruvian Indians.
- "Mexican Mornings" Gourmet, February 1947.

== Bibliography ==
- Chicago Brookfield Zoological Society, Chicago, Federici~Ross, Andrea, "Let the Lions Roar, History of the Brookfield Zoo"
- Schaller, George B, New York Zoological Society, National Geographic magazine archive, Vol. 160. No.6, Dec. 1981, Vol 169, No. 3 March 1986
- Brady, Erika, Smithsonian Magazine, Vol. 14 Number 9, "First Panda Shanghaied in China, stirred up a Ruckas"
- Kiefer, Michael, "Chasing the Giant Panda" 2002, ISBN 1-56858-223-4
- Masloff, E.B. '" Panda Wishes", (2000)
- Masloff, E.B., "A Time for Loving Part I, II and III," published on www.FemExplorers.com (2002)
- Croke, Vicki Constantine, The Lady and the Panda (2005) (ISBN 0-375-50783-3).
- Nicholls, Henry, "The Way of the Panda: The Curious History of China's Political Animal" (2010) (Google Books)
