= Roots and Branches (film) =

2001 film by Yu Zhong

- Directed by: Yu Zhong
- Screenplay by: Tong Cheng and Yu Zhong
- Starring: Gigi Leung, Jiang Wu, Xia Yu, Chen Shi, Cui Jian
- Cinematography: Lu Gan
- Edited by: Zhou Meiping
- Music by: Luan Shu
- Release dates: 2001 (PRC, HK)
- Country: China
- Language: Mandarin
- Budget: 2 million RMB
- Box office: 16 million RMB

Roots and Branches (Chinese: 我的兄弟姊妹, pinyin: Wo de xiongdi jiemei, literally "My Brothers and Sisters") is a Chinese film released in 2001. It was the third highest grossing Chinese film of 2001 at the domestic box office, but was not well received critically.

== Plot ==
The parents of a family of four die in a blizzard and the children (two boys and two girls) are brought up separately. Twenty years later, the daughter who was adopted and taken abroad is returning to China as an internationally renowned classical musician and seeks to reconnect with her siblings, who are all living very different lives.

The father of the children, a music teacher, is played by rock star Cui Jian, who wrote a song, Meng ("Dream"), especially to be performed by his "pupils" in the film.

== Cast ==
- Cui Jian
- Gigi Leung as Qi Sitian
- Jiang Wu as Qi Yiku
- Xia Yu as Qi Miao
- Chen Shi
