= Su-Lin Young =

American explorer

Adelaide "Su-Lin" Young
- 楊陳瑞苓
- Pronunciation: Yáng Chén Ruìlíng
- Born: Adelaide Young; December 23, 1911; New York City, U.S.
- Died: April 17, 2008 (aged 96); Hercules, California, U.S.
- Other name: Su-Lin
- Education: Wesleyan College
- Occupations: Explorer; journalist; disc jockey
- Employer: US Armed Forces Network Radio Taiwan
- Organization: American Museum of Natural History
- Known for: First American woman to explore the Himalayas in the 1930s and Su Lin, the first giant panda brought to the United States, was named for her
- Spouse: Jack Young (m. 1933)
- Children: 3
- Father: Ming Tai Chen

Adelaide "Su-Lin" Young (Chinese: 楊陳瑞苓; pinyin: Yáng Chén Ruìlíng; 23 December 1911 – 17 April 2008) was an American explorer, journalist, and disc jockey. A Chinese American, she was the first American woman to explore the Himalayas in the 1930s and Su Lin, the first giant panda brought to the United States, was named for her.

She was born in New York City to Mother Katherine Moy and Father Ming Tai Chin, the wealthy owner of the famed Palais D'Or Night Club and graduated from Wesleyan College in Macon, Georgia.

In 1934, she arrived in southwestern China as a newlywed with her husband Jack Young and his younger brother Quentin Young to gather animal specimens and catalog plants for the American Museum of Natural History on an expedition financed by Theodore Roosevelt Jr. and Kermit Roosevelt, sons of former U.S. President Theodore Roosevelt.

After exploring parts of China, Tibet, and India, Young worked as a reporter in Shanghai for the English-language North China Daily News and Arthur Sowerby's China Journal. In Shanghai, Young met explorer Ruth Harkness, another American woman, who captured the first giant panda to be sent the United States. Harkness named the panda Su-Lin for Young, a name also given to Su Lin, a panda born in 2005 at the San Diego Zoo.

After relocating several times in China due to the Second Sino-Japanese War (World War II) Young left China after the Chinese Communist Party takeover in 1949. She spent time as a radio disk jockey in Taiwan for the United States Armed Forces Network Radio Taiwan (now ICRT) attached to the Military Assistance Advisory Group (MAAG) Taiwan.

Young returned to the United States in the 1950s living in Virginia, California, and North Carolina. She died at age 96 in Hercules, California.
