= Once Upon a Time in Shanghai (1998 film) =

- Film poster
- Traditional Chinese: 上海紀事
- Simplified Chinese: 上海纪事
- Literal meaning: Shanghai chronicle
- Hanyu Pinyin: Shànghǎi jìshì
- Directed by: Peng Xiaolian
- Written by: Bian Zhenxia; Jiang Xiaoqin; Zhang Jianya; Peng Xiaolian
- Produced by: Zhu Yongde
- Starring: Wang Yanan; Yuan Quan; Liu Qiong
- Cinematography: Jong Lin
- Edited by: Shen Chuanti
- Music by: Pan Guoxing
- Production company: Shanghai Film Studio
- Release date: 1998 (China)
- Running time: 97 minutes
- Country: China
- Language: Mandarin

Once Upon a Time in Shanghai is a 1998 Chinese film directed by Peng Xiaolian, set in the tumultuous late-1940s just before the communist takeover of Shanghai. The film stars Wang Yanan and Yuan Quan.

== Awards and nominations ==
Year	Award	Category	Individual	Result
1999	19th Golden Rooster Awards	Best Actor	Wang Yanan	Nominated
1999	19th Golden Rooster Awards	Best Actress	Yuan Quan	Nominated
1999	Huabiao Awards	Outstanding Film		Top-4 films
