= Peng Xiaolian =

Chinese film director (1953–2019)

- 彭小莲
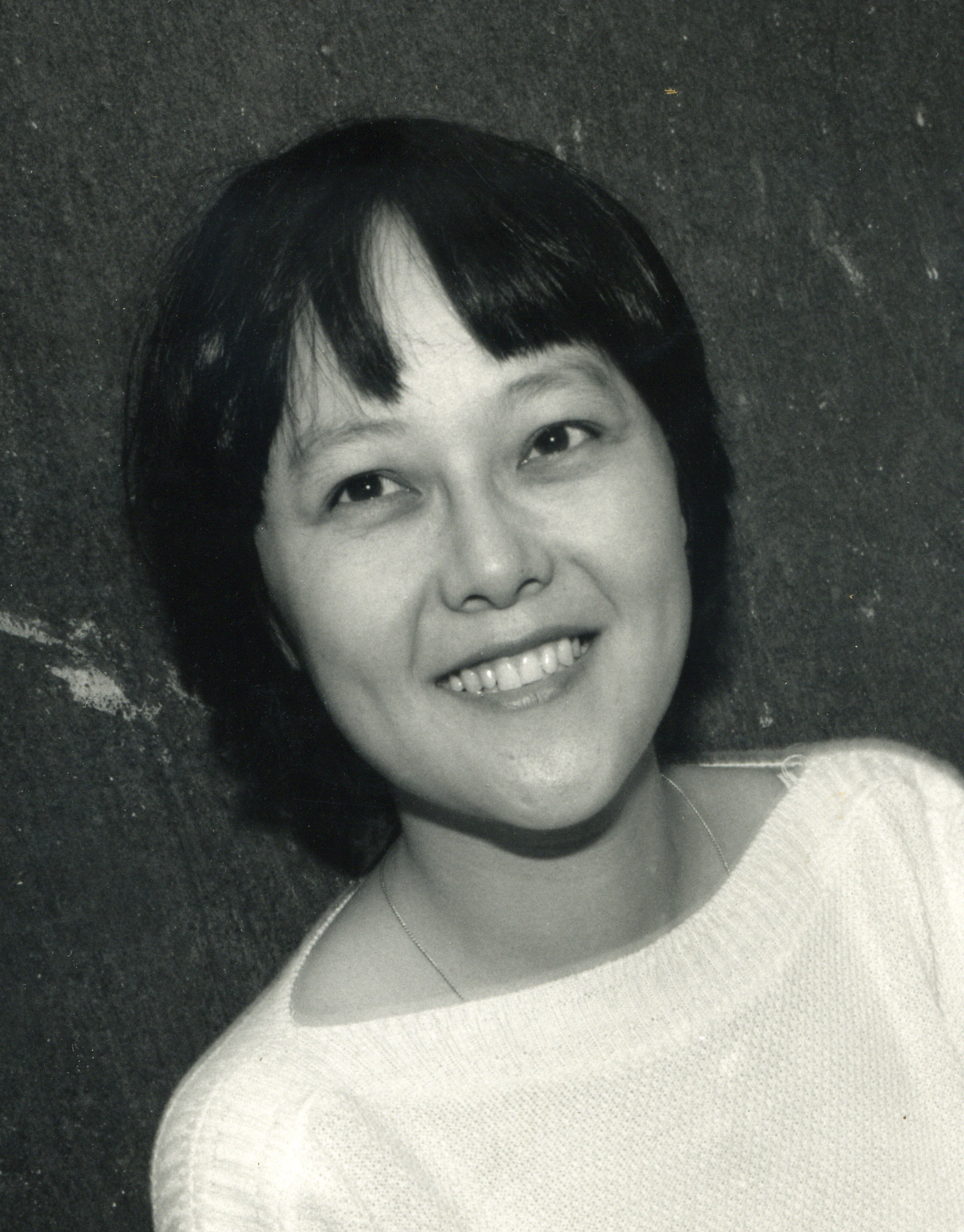
- Peng Xiaolian in 1989
- Born: 26 June 1953; Chaling, Hunan
- Died: 19 June 2019 (aged 65); Shanghai
- Education: Beijing Film Academy
- Occupations: Film director, writer
- Years active: 1982–2018

Chinese name
- Simplified Chinese: 彭小莲
- Traditional Chinese: 彭小蓮
Transcriptions
Standard Mandarin
- Hanyu Pinyin: Péng Xiǎolián
- Wade–Giles: P'eng Hsiao-lien
- IPA: [pʰə̌ŋ ɕjàʊljɛ̌n]

Peng Xiaolian (Chinese: 彭小莲; 26 June 1953 – 19 June 2019) was a Chinese film director, scriptwriter and author. A graduate of the 1982 class of the Beijing Film Academy, she was a member of the Fifth Generation, although her style differed from the other members of this group. She is known for her series of films about Shanghai, including Once Upon a Time in Shanghai (1998), which won the Best Picture Award of the Huabiao Awards; Shanghai Story (2004), which won four Golden Rooster Awards including Best Director and Best Picture; and Shanghai Rumba (2006), based on the romance of the movie star couple Zhao Dan and Huang Zongying.

== Early life ==
Peng was born on 26 June 1953 in Chaling County, Hunan, and grew up in Shanghai. She was the youngest daughter of Peng Baishan (1910–1968) and his wife Zhu Weiming. As a young child she experienced the terror of political persecution of her father. Baishan was the Minister of Propaganda in Shanghai when he was arrested for his association with Hu Feng, a literary critic and politician. Along with other associates of Hu, he was condemned as a core member of the "Hu Feng Counterrevolutionary Clique" and suffered in prison and labor camp. This family tragedy had a major influence on Xiaolian, who vividly depicts the terrifying memories in the 1987 novella "On My Back", the 1997 short story "To That Faraway Place", and in the 2009 documentary Storm under the Sun that she co-directed with Louisa Wei.

When the Cultural Revolution began in 1966, her mother began to suffer brutality from the Red Guards. The ultimate terror of the family came in 1968 when her father was beaten to death. Even years later, Peng insisted on writing about the chaotic years and the aftermath in fictions like the novel Shanghai Story, the novella "Holding up the Book I Read Everyday" and the novella "Childhood: Secrets of Four Seasons".

Like millions of her generation, she was sent down to the countryside for "re-education" by peasants during the Cultural Revolution. Although she spent nine years in the countryside of Jiangxi province, not many works of hers except for "Burning Connections" write about the experience.

After the end of the Cultural Revolution, Peng entered Beijing Film Academy in 1978 to study directing, together with Li Shaohong, Chen Kaige, Tian Zhuangzhuang and others, who would later be known as China's Fifth Generation film directors.

== Career ==
=== Directorial debut ===
Upon graduation from Beijing Film Academy in 1982, Peng was assigned to work at Shanghai Film Studio, where she first worked as an assistant director. Three years later, she was given a teenage film Me and My Classmates to direct. The film was a success and won the Best Children's Film Award of the 1987 Golden Rooster Awards. As a reward, she was a given a chance to direct a film that she had wanted to direct: Women's Story (1988). This film made her known to the world, not only by entering festivals like The Creteil Women's International Film Festival and Hawaii International Film Festival, but also praised for its strong feminine subjectivity and its portrayal of rural Chinese women.

=== Life in New York ===
In 1989, Peng won a script award for her script "Difficult Truth" at Rotterdam Film Festival, but could not make the film in China due to the tightening ideology. She thought about leaving China and the success of her first two films helped to win a Rockefeller scholarship. She enrolled in the MFA program in New York University and graduated in 1996. Although she did not complete a single film in New York, her experience in New York inspired many fictional works, including novellas “The Abingdon Square”, “Burning Connections”, “A Drop of Ram Shit” set in New York, “Exile’s Return” and “On the Way Home”—all collected in her novella collection titled On the Way Home.

=== Directorial career ===
After returning to China in 1996, Peng co-wrote (with Guo Lingling) the script for Huang Shuqin's film My Daddy. Together with Zhu Bin, she directed her first thriller, The Dog Homicide (1996).

In the following decade, she made a series of films about Shanghai. Once Upon a Time in Shanghai (1998), a historical film about the Shanghai Campaign of 1949, won the Best Film Award of the Huabiao Awards. Shanghai Women (2002) portrays contemporary life in the fast-changing city. Shanghai Story (2004), which explores the vicissitudes of life of a bourgeois family from the 1920s to the 1990s, won four Golden Rooster Awards, including Best Director and Best Picture. Shanghai Rumba (2006) is based on the romance of the famous movie star couple Zhao Dan and Huang Zongying. These films made her known as a representative figure in presenting the culture of Shanghai. She also made a children's animation film, Keke's Magic Umbrella (2000).

In 2009, Peng co-directed (with Louisa Wei) the documentary Storm Under the Sun, an investigation of the Hu Feng affair which had implicated her father. Peng and Wei interviewed 26 people who had been denounced as "counterrevolutionaries" for their association with Hu Feng.

== Later life and death ==
Peng was diagnosed with breast cancer in 2013. She underwent chemotherapy and her health temporarily recovered. She began writing a book about her father titled Four Seasons of Childhood, and planned to make it into a film. She also spent two years writing the book Editor Zhong Shuhe – A Documentary on Paper, about the publisher Zhong Shuhe (钟叔河). However, her health deteriorated again in November 2018 before she was able to finish either project. She died on 19 June 2019 in Shanghai, at age 66.

== Selected filmography ==
=== As director ===
Year	English Title	Chinese Title	Notes
2018	Please Remember Me	请你记住我	
2009	Storm Under the Sun	红日风暴	Documentary about the Hu Feng affair, co-directed with Louisa Wei.
2006	Shanghai Rumba	上海伦巴	Based on the lives of Zhao Dan and his wife Huang Zongying
2004	Shanghai Story	美丽上海	Won four 2004 Golden Rooster Awards, including the Best Picture and Best Director awards.
2002	Shanghai Women	假装没感觉	
2001	Red Persimmons	满山红柿	Japanese: 満山紅柿 (Manzan Benigaki). Completed an unfinished documentary by Japanese director Shinsuke Ogawa.
2000	Keke's Magic Umbrella	可可的魔伞	Children's animation
1998	Once Upon a Time in Shanghai	上海纪事	Won the Best Film Award of the Huabiao Awards
1996	The Dog Homicide	犬杀	Co-directed with Zhu Bin (朱斌)
1987	Women's Story	女人的故事	
1986	Me and My Classmates	我和我的同学们	Won the Best Children's Film Award at the 1987 Golden Rooster Awards.
