= Su Lin (1930s giant panda) =

Giant panda brought to the US

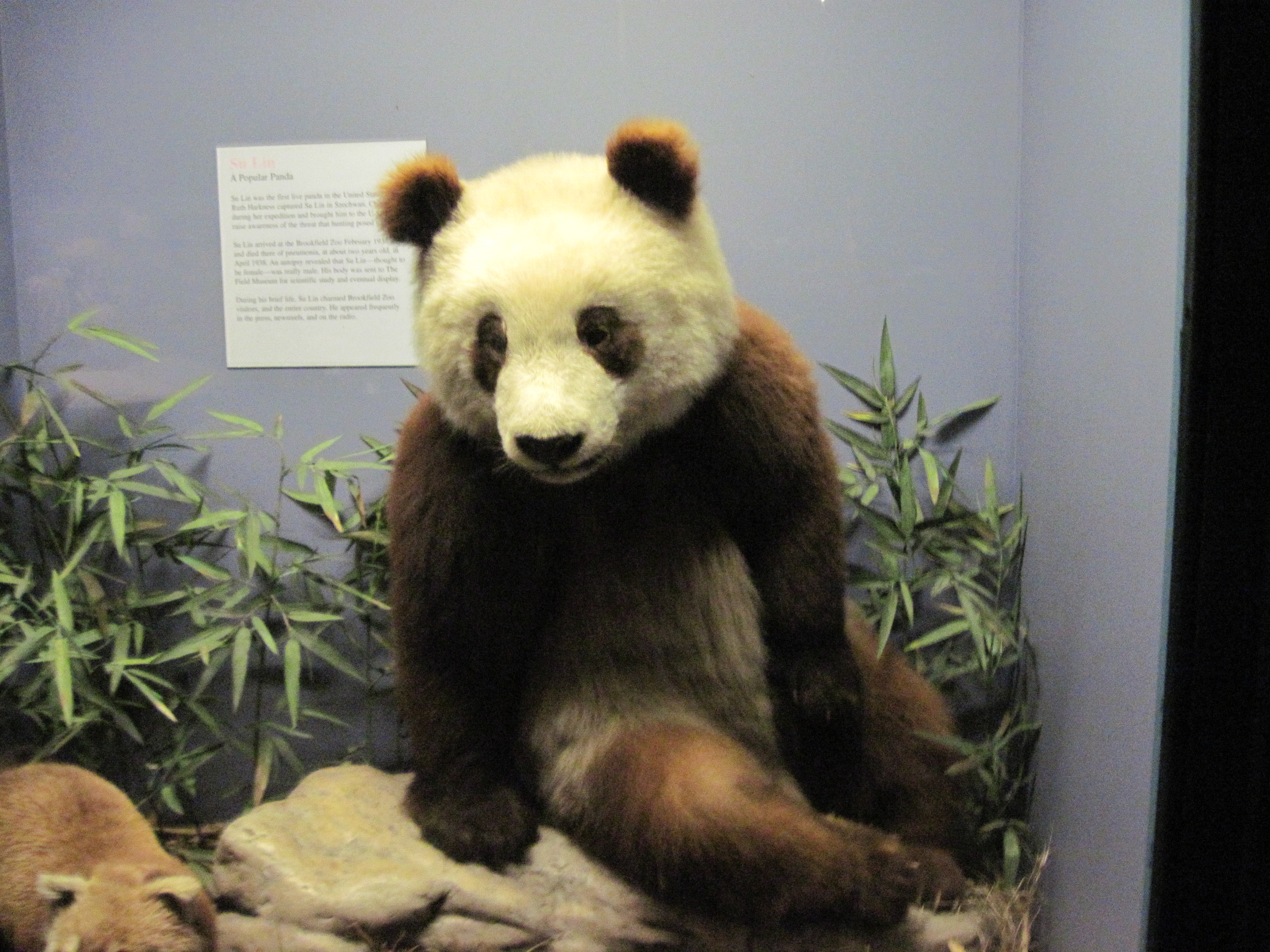
- Su Lin's body on display at the Field Museum of Natural History in Chicago
- Species: Giant panda
- Sex: Male

Su Lin (Chinese: 蘇琳; pinyin: Sūlín) was the name given to the giant panda cub captured in 1936 and brought to America by Ruth Harkness.

== History ==
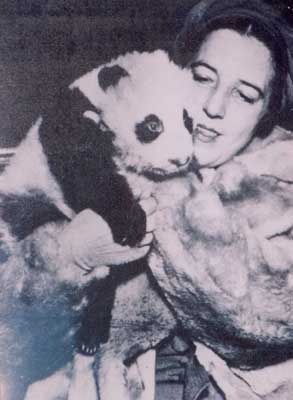
Ruth Elizabeth Harkness and Su Lin

Harkness mentioned in her 1938 book The Baby Giant Panda that the capture took place within a day's walk from the Min River in Sichuan. Su Lin, about 9 weeks old at the time of his capture, was named after Su-Lin Young, the sister-in-law of Harkness's Chinese-American expedition partner Quentin Young. Harkness translated Su Lin as meaning "a little bit of something very cute". (Harkness and Young were unaware that the baby panda was, in fact, a male.)

Harkness returned to America with the bottle-fed cub, and Su Lin became the first live panda to be displayed in the United States. In April 1937, the panda was purchased by Brookfield Zoo outside of Chicago, where he was visited by such celebrities as Shirley Temple, Kermit Roosevelt, and Helen Hayes. Harkness brought a second panda, Mei-Mei, to be a companion for Su Lin at the zoo in February 1938. However, the two animals fought with each other, and were soon separated. Su Lin died of pneumonia only a few weeks after Mei-Mei's arrival. He was replaced by Mei-Lan the following year.

== See also ==
- List of individual giant pandas
- List of individual bears
