= Elliot Leung =

Elliot Leung 梁皓一
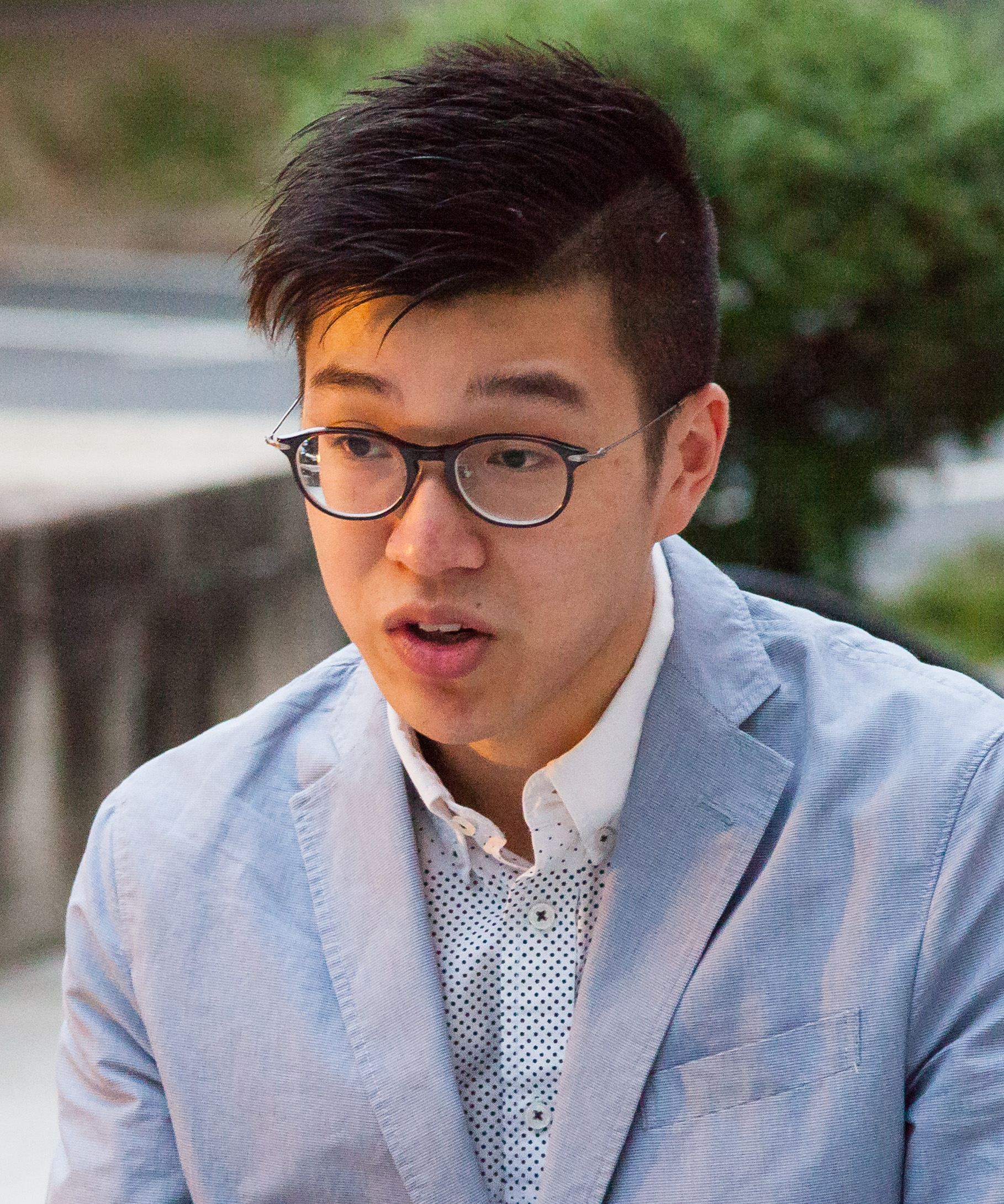
- Leung in 2017

Background information
- Born: Elliot Ho Yat Leung; August 3, 1995 (age 31); British Hong Kong
- Genres: Film scores; classical; symphonic
- Occupations: Composer; music director; conductor
- Instruments: Piano; cello
- Years active: 2013–present
- Labels: Sony Classical; Sony Masterworks
- Publisher: Sony Music
- Awards: Huabiao Award, 2023
- Website: elliotleung.com

Elliot Ho Yat Leung (Chinese: 梁皓一; pinyin: Liang Haoyi; born August 3, 1995) is a Chinese composer and conductor. Leung is known for his symphonic works, most notably his film scores for Operation Red Sea, The Battle at Lake Changjin, and The Furious, as well as his orchestral concert works The Metaverse, Wuxia, and Chinese Kitchen: A Feast of Flavours.

== Early life and education ==
Leung was born and raised in British Hong Kong, the eldest of two children to a father who had dreams to be a visual artist and a mother who wanted to pursue a musical career. His mother plays piano and was first chorale soprano, then a choir conductor. At age 5, he was a gifted child case study in The Oxford Handbook of Children's Musical Cultures. He received early music education in St. Paul's Co-educational College and the Hong Kong Academy of Performing Arts, and transferred to International Christian School in his secondary years.

When Leung was two years old, his mother began teaching him how to play the piano. When he turned five, his swift musical growth was quickly identified by teachers of St. Paul's Co-educational College. When he was fifteen, Leung made his debut appearance on CCTV's "Asian Art Festival · Charming China (亞洲藝術盛典 · 魅力中國)" show. As a child, Leung aspired to be a conductor until encountering the music from Halo: Combat Evolved during his teens, driving him to pursue another career that revolves around symphonic music.

Martin O'Donnell's modal music from the Halo franchise was a large musical influence throughout Leung's upbringing which lead him to study music composition at his alma mater Wheaton Conservatory. The two met during Leung's time as a student and since then was mentored by O'Donnell during his years in the United States. In an interview, Leung commented that his original post-college intentions were to follow O'Donnell's footsteps and pursue graduate studies in music at the University of Southern California until he was scouted and hired as the composer for Operation Red Sea.

== Career ==
=== 2014 to 2017: Beginnings in Hong Kong ===
Leung's first job in the film industry was working as a music assistant on the film "Insanity" in 2014. In 2015, he started writing music for various kinds of projects while continuing to work as an orchestrator. During this time, his choral music was highly praised by Bernard Chan of the Hong Kong Executive Council. He also composed RTHK radio 1's new station jingle. His arrangement of "Descendants of the Dragon" was also performed in Shenzhen as the concert finale celebrating the Hong Kong SAR's 20th Anniversary.

Leung's breakthrough came in 2017, when Dante Lam sought him out to compose the score of Operation Red Sea. The film was selected to represent Hong Kong in the best foreign-language film category at the 91st Academy Awards.

=== 2017–2021: Breakthrough in the Chinese film industry ===
Leung's work on Operation Red Sea was highly acclaimed and was broadly praised by critics for elevating Chinese film music to a world class standard. Alex Lines from Film Inquiry called it "a score that invigorates life" while Jonathan Broxton of Movie Music UK wrote a positive review. Leung was invited to write for The Rescue, and was involved in the production since pre-production. After numerous delays due to the COVID-19 pandemic, the soundtrack album was finally released internationally by Milan Records on December 18, 2020. Many of Leung's pieces from these films, such as "The Valiant Flight" and "Operation Red Sea Concert Suite" have been performed on numerous occasions, such as the 8th Beijing International Film Festival and the 1st Foshan Film Festival. A much longer suite, titled "Operation Red Sea Concert Suite II" was commissioned by the Guangzhou Symphony Orchestra and premiered in the New Year Concert of 2024 to a full house audience.

Leung has also produced music for the video game industry. Tencent Games invited him to compose for Honor of Kings, and ByteDance invited him to compose for Dragonheir: Silent Gods and Moonton Games invited him to compose for Mobile Legends: Bang Bang.

In 2021, Leung composed the theme and the score for The Battle at Lake Changjin, the second-highest-grossing film of 2021; the second highest-grossing film in Chinese cinema history; and the second highest-grossing non-English film of all time. Leung was invited to return for the sequel, The Battle at Lake Changjin II. The score was nominated for a Golden Rooster Award and won a Huabiao Award for Outstanding Composer. Leung won the award at age 26, making him the youngest ever to win a Huabiao in the music category.

=== 2022–2023: Hollywood and Symphony No. 1 ===
In 2022, Leung was listed on the Forbes' 2022 30 under 30. After writing for Disney+ series Anita, Leung decided to return to his classical roots and began a yearlong journey composing his Symphony No. 1 "The Metaverse" while relocating to Los Angeles in a bid to break into Hollywood. The symphony was commissioned by the Hong Kong Philharmonic Orchestra and the Asia Society as the world's first symphony work to be premiered both in a concert hall and in the Sandbox. In early 2022, Leung signed with Kraft-Engel Management. Shortly after, he was announced as the composer of Six Days in Fallujah by Victura and Highwire Games and Freelance by Pierre Morel. The Hong Kong Philharmonic Orchestra premiered Symphony No. 1 "The Metaverse" and "Through the Fog, Into the Darkness," an overture to Six Days in Fallujah on May 5th, 2023 under the baton of conductor Gerard Salonga in the Hong Kong Cultural Centre concert hall with a full house audience. The Shanghai Symphony Orchestra later performed the work in July 2023.

The symphony was released on October 27, 2023 by Sony Classical.

=== 2024–present: Return to classical music ===
In September 2023, the Guangzhou Symphony Orchestra commissioned Leung to write a new piece for their 23-24 season. Leung composed "Aureate Skylines." The premiere was conducted by Daniel Harding on January 28th, 2024 in Xinghai Concert Hall. The piece was then toured and performed in Shenzhen Concert Hall and the Hong Kong Cultural Centre. In November 2023, the New York Philharmonic announced the world premiere of Leung's Lunar Overture. The piece broke the 12 year-long (1 Lunar New Year Cycle) Lunar New Year concert tradition of opening with Spring Festival Overture to a full house at David Geffen Hall. Lunar Overture had its premiere in Asia on December 31, 2024 with the Shanghai Symphony Orchestra under the baton of Charles Dutoit.

On July 15th, the Shanghai Symphony Orchestra premiered "Wuxia - Commemorating the 100th Anniversary of the Birth of Jin Yong ," to an in-house and online audience of 40,000 people. The piece was co-commissioned by the Shanghai Symphony Orchestra, the Hangzhou Philharmonic Orchestra and the Chengdu Symphony Orchestra.

"Your Intentions, My Affections," commissioned by the United States Department of State was also premiered and toured by mezzo-soprano Carla Dirlikov Canales in July and August 2024. The text from the piece is from 《土楼回响》and served as the United States Arts Envoy piece.

The Shanghai Symphony Orchestra premiered of "Chinese Kitchen," a 10-movement piece celebrating the 10th anniversary of Jaguar Symphony Concert Hall and also the 145th anniversary of the Orchestra on November 26, 2024 and was praised as a fun, humorous composition with rich emotions. The piece was toured by the orchestra to the Sydney Opera House, Melbourne Town Hall, Auckland Arts Festival and Singapore Esplanade in March 2026.

China Records released Vinyls of both "Wuxia" and Chinese Kitchen in November 2025.

In February 2026, he signed general management to Askonas Holt.

On September 25 2026, he conducted a full program of his works in the Poly Theatre, Beijing. September 30th also saw the premiere of his symphonic poem for orchestra and choir titled "The Path of Faith."

== Discography ==
=== Film ===
Year	Title	Director(s)	Studio(s)	Notes
2018	Operation Red Sea	Dante Lam	Bona Film Group Emperor Motion Pictures Star Dream Media	First Collaboration with Dante Lam
2020	The Rescue	Dante Lam	Tencent Pictures Polybona Films Emperor Motion Pictures	Second Collaboration with Dante Lam
2021	Great Expectations	Li Chengpeng	Bona Film Group	
2021	The Battle at Lake Changjin	Dante Lam Chen Kaige Hark Tsui	Bona Film Group August First Film Studio Emperor Motion Pictures Alibaba Pictures	Fourth Collaboration with Dante Lam
2022	The Battle at Lake Changjin II - Water Gate Bridge	Dante Lam Chen Kaige Hark Tsui	Bona Film Group August First Film Studio Emperor Motion Pictures Alibaba Pictures	Fifth Collaboration with Dante Lam
2023	Freelance	Pierre Morel	AGC Studios Sentient Entertainment Relativity Media	Hollywood Debut, in collaboration with Geoff Zanelli
2023	Bursting Point	Dante Lam	Polybona Films Emperor Motion Pictures	Sixth Collaboration with Dante Lam
2024	Cesium Fallout	Anthony Pun	Alibaba Pictures Fosun Pictures Edko Films	
2025	Operation Hadal	Dante Lam	Bona Film Group Huaxia Film Distribution Star Dream Studio Media	Seventh Collaboration with Dante Lam
2026	The Furious	Kenji Tanigaki	Lionsgate Films Edko Films XYZ Films	
2026	V	Han Yan	Pearl River Film Group Co. Ltd China Film Group Co.,Ltd Lian Ray Pictures	

=== Concert music ===
Year	Title	Notes
2023	Symphony No. 1 "The Metaverse"	Co-commissioned by the Hong Kong Philharmonic Orchestra and the Asia Society, sponsored by Chow Sang Sang and Audio Exotics, premiere conducted by Gerard Salonga
2023	Through the Fog, Into the Darkness	Commissioned by Victura and Highwire Games as an orchestral overture to the game Six Days in Fallujah
2024	Lunar Overture	World Premiere by the New York Philharmonic, conducted by Yu Long, Asia Premiere conducted by Charles Dutoit
2024	Aureate Skylines	Commissioned by the Guangzhou Symphony Orchestra, premiere conducted by Daniel Harding
2024	Wuxia	Co-commissioned by the Shanghai Symphony Orchestra, Hangzhou Philharmonic Orchestra and Chengdu Symphony Orchestra, Commemorating the 100th Anniversary of the Birth of Jin Yong
2024	Chinese Kitchen	Commissioned by the Shanghai Symphony Orchestra
2025	Tree	Co-commissioned by the Shanghai Symphony Orchestra and the Shanghai Botanical Gardens
2025	Storm and Steel	Commissioned by the Guangzhou Symphony Orchestra
2026	The Path of Faith	Commissioned by the Shanghai Symphony Orchestra

=== Video games ===
Year	Title	Studio(s)	Notes
2021	LifeAfter: Season 3	Netease Games	
2022	Honor of Kings	Tencent Games TiMi Studio Group Level Infinite	Co-composer
2022	Mobile Legends: Bang Bang	Moonton Elex Technology	Co-composer
2022	Dragonheir: Silent Gods	Sgra Studio ByteDance Nuverse	Co-composer
2023	Six Days in Fallujah	Highwire Games Victura	

=== Television series ===
Year	Title	Director(s)	Studio(s)	Notes
2021	Anita: Director's Cut	Longman Leung	Edko Films Disney+ Huaxia Film Distribution One Cool Film Production	

== Awards and nominations ==
Year	Award	Nominated work	Result
2019	ASCAP Award for Screen Music	Operation Red Sea	Won
2022	Golden Roster Award for Best Original Score	The Battle at Lake Changjin	Nominated
2023	Huabiao Award for Best Original Score	The Battle at Lake Changjin	Won
2023	G.A.N.G. Award for Best Main Theme G.A.N.G. Award for Best Audio in a Casual or Social Game	Honor of Kings	Won
