= The Rescue (2020 film) =

- Theatrical release poster
- Traditional Chinese: 緊急救援
- Simplified Chinese: 紧急救援
- Literal meaning: Urgent Rescue
- Hanyu Pinyin: jǐnjí jiùyuán
- Directed by: Dante Lam
- Written by: Maria Wong; Tan Yuli; Yaqing Zhi
- Produced by: Candy Leung
- Starring: Eddie Peng; Wang Yanlin; Xin Zhilei; Lan Yingying; Wang Yutian; Xu Yang
- Cinematography: Peter Pau
- Edited by: Choi Chi-Hung
- Music by: Elliot Leung
- Production companies: Bona Film Group; China Communications Press; China Modern Film And Television Development; Tencent Pictures; Autonavi YunMap Technology; Maoyan Weying Culture Media; Emperor Film Production Company Limited
- Distributed by: CMC Pictures
- Release date: 18 December 2020
- Running time: 139 minutes
- Country: China
- Language: Mandarin
- Budget: $90 million
- Box office: $74.9 million

The Rescue (Chinese: 紧急救援) is a 2020 Chinese action film directed by Dante Lam. The film follows the personal and professional lives of members from the China Rescue & Salvage, which is under the Chinese Ministry of Transport. The film stars Eddie Peng, Wang Yanlin, Xin Zhilei, Lan Yingying, Wang Yutian, and Xu Yang. The film was initially scheduled to be released in China on 25 January 2020, but was delayed due to COVID-19 pandemic. The Rescue is the third film in a series of films directed by Dante Lam that pays tribute to Chinese public personnel, including 2016's Operation Mekong (the police) and 2018's Operation Red Sea (the navy). The film has received financial and production backing and assistance from the Chinese Ministry of Transport.

Released on 18 December 2020, the film received generally positive reviews from critics but grossed just $74 million against a budget of $90 million.

== Cast ==
- Eddie Peng as Gao Qian
- Wang Yanlin as Zhao Cheng
- Xin Zhilei as Fang Yuling
- Lan Yingying as Wen Shan
- Wang Yutian as An Peng
- Xu Yang as Bai Yang
- Li Mincheng as Liu Bin
- Carlos Chan as Lin Weiquan
- Zhang Guoqiang as Pan Zhengjun
- Guo Xiaodong (cameo appearance) as Ding Yi
- Wei Daxun (cameo appearance) as Huo Da

== Music ==
The Rescue Original Motion Picture Soundtrack

Studio album by Elliot Leung
- Released: 2020
- Genre: Film soundtrack
- Labels: Milan Records; Sony Classical

Elliot Leung was invited to return after composing the score to Operation Red Sea. The score was recorded in Synchron Stage. On 18 December, Sony Classical and Milan Records released a soundtrack album consisting of 27 tracks.

== Release ==
The film was originally scheduled to be released on 25 January 2020 in both China and the United States, but was delayed due to the COVID-19 pandemic. It was later released on 18 December 2020.

== Reception ==
=== Box office ===
The Rescue grossed $8.9 million in its first day of release. Chinese audiences gave the film 9.2/10 on Maoyan, 9/10 on Taopiaopiao, and 6.6/10 on Douban. It went on to debut to $36.1 million, finishing first at the box office. Variety wrote that the total was "far below projections and could mean the film will lose money."

In the United States and Canada, the film had a limited release and ranked 25th in its opening weekend, grossing $9,674 from 65 theaters with an average of $148 per theater

=== Critical response ===
On review aggregator Rotten Tomatoes, the film has an approval rating of 90% based on 10 reviews, with an average rating of 6.4/10.
