= Operation Hadal =

2025 Chinese-Hong Kong film by Dante Lam

- Theatrical release poster
- Traditional Chinese: 蛟龍行動
- Simplified Chinese: 蛟龙行动
- Hanyu Pinyin: Jiāolóng Xíngdòng
- Directed by: Dante Lam
- Written by: Dante Lam; Zhi Yaqing
- Produced by: Dante Lam; Liang Fengying
- Starring: Huang Xuan; Yu Shi; Zhang Hanyu; Duan Yihong; Wang Junkai; Du Jiang; Li Chen
- Cinematography: Peter Pau
- Edited by: He Yongyi; Hong Xiaoru; Jin Duanni
- Music by: Elliot Leung
- Production companies: Bona Film Group; Guizhou Radio & TV Media Group; Star Dream Studio Media (Ning Bo) Co., Ltd. Huaxia Film Distribution
- Distributed by: Bona Film Group; Well Go USA Entertainment; Distribution Workshop
- Release dates: January 29, 2025 (China); August 30, 2025 (China, Special Edition)
- Running time: 146 minutes 130 minutes (Special Edition)
- Countries: China; Hong Kong
- Language: Mandarin
- Budget: 1 billion RMB
- Box office: $53.75 million

Operation Hadal or Operation Leviathan (simplified Chinese: 蛟龙行动; traditional Chinese: 蛟龍行動; pinyin: Jiāolóng Xíngdòng; lit. 'Operation Jiaolong') is a 2025 action war film. It is a follow-up to the 2018 film Operation Red Sea. Differing from the previous film's above-water action set-pieces, this film is about a nuclear submarine and features mainly underwater action. A co-production between China and Hong Kong, the film was produced by Bona Film Group and directed by Dante Lam, and it stars Huang Xuan, Yu Shi, Zhang Hanyu, and Du Jiang.

It was released in China on 29 January 2025 (Chinese New Year). However, unlike Dante's previous two films, Operation Hadal was not a commercial success, as it faced criticisms over its weak character development, plot, and narrative and logical flaws.

== Plot ==
In the near future, the Chinese Navy intercepts critical intelligence—an advanced super-submarine is secretly plotting a top-secret military operation against cities along China's southeastern coast. In response, China deploys its latest submarine, Longjing, to coordinate with the elite Jiaolong Squad in a high-stakes mission. The battlefield beneath the ocean is fraught with danger as the squad faces relentless traps, and the submarine engages in a series of intense confrontations with the enemy. As they maneuver through ambushes, they venture deep into the vast abyss filled with undersea volcanoes.

== Cast ==
- Huang Xuan as Meng Chuang, Jiaolong platoon leader
- Yu Shi as Han Xiao, Jiaolong platoon member
- Zhang Hanyu as Zhao Qihang, Commanding officer of the submarine Longjing
- Wang Junkai as Cao Honglang, Sonarman on the submarine Longjing
- Duan Yihong as Fang Yi, Chief of staff of a naval theater
- Du Jiang as Xu Hong, Jiaolong platoon second in-command and dynamiter
- Li Chen as Zhou Peilin, Second in-command of the submarine Longjing
- Wang Yanlin as Luo Xing, Sniper in Jiaolong platoon
- Jiang Luxia as Tong Li, Machine-gunner in Jiaolong platoon
- Elvis Han as Qin Dawei, Commando
- Li Jiuxiao as Ding Xikai, Commando
- Gao Ge as Ling Feng, Commando
- Sun Yi as Xing Lei, Commando
- Yu Zhen as Gao Jun, Commando
- Yuan Wenkang as Chen Chang'an, Commando
- Ye He as Zhai Huan, Commando
- Bryan Larkin as Admiral Walter, the main Antagonist, a renegade Naval Admiral who mutinies and takes over a Shadow Class submarine the Abyss.

== Production ==
Operation Hadal was filmed in Qingdao. Production used multiple models of naval vessels. It was filmed entirely with IMAX cameras.

== Soundtrack ==
Elliot Leung who composed the score to Operation Red Sea returned for the sequel. The soundtrack album containing 27 tracks with a duration of approximately 66 minutes was released by Sony Music on January 29, 2025.

== Release ==
Operation Hadal It was released on 29 January 2025 (Chinese New Year).

== See also ==
- Jiaolong (submersible), a real-life submersible named similarly to the film in Chinese
- Special Operations Brigade (PLA Navy Marine Corps), real-life commando unit known as the "Jiaolong Commandos"
