= Hundred Flowers Award for Best Actor =

China Film Association award

The Hundred Flowers Award for Best Actor was first awarded by the China Film Association in 1962.

== Winners & nominations ==
=== 1960s ===
Year	Actor	Film	Character
1962 (1st)	Cui Wei	Keep Red Flag Flying	Zhu Laogong / Zhu Laozhong
1963 (2nd)	Zhang Liang	Courageous Fighter	Chen Dahu / Chen Erhu

=== 1980–2004 ===
Year	Actor	Film	Character
1980 (3rd)	Li Rentang	Tear Stain	Zhu Keshi
1981 (4th)	Da Shichang	The Swallow Returns	Lin Hanhua
1982 (5th)	Wang Xingang	True Confidant	Cai E
1983 (6th)	Yan Shunkai	The True Story of Ah Q	Ah Q
1984 (7th)	Yang Zaibao	Blood Is Always Hot	Luo Xingang
1985 (8th)	Lü Xiaohe	Wreaths at the Foot of the Mountain	Liang Sanxi
1986 (9th)	Yang Zaibao	Substitute Mayor	Xiao Ziyun
1987 (10th)	Jiang Wen	Hibiscus Town	Qin Shutian
1988 (11th)	Zhang Yimou	Old Well	Sun Wangquan
1989 (12th)	Jiang Wen	Chuntao	Xiang Gao
1990 (13th)	Gu Yue	The Birth of New China	Mao Zedong
1991 (14th)	Li Xuejian	Jiao Yulu	Jiao Yulu
1992 (15th)	Wang Tiecheng	Zhou Enlai	Zhou Enlai
1993 (16th)	Gu Yue	The Story of Mao Zedong	Mao Zedong
1994 (17th)	Li Baotian	Country Teachers	Headmaster Yu
1995 (18th)	Li Rentang	The Accused Uncle Shangang	Uncle Shan Gang
1996 (19th)	Zhang Guoli	The Strangers in Beijing	Sha Xin
1997 (20th)	Gao Ming	Kong Fansen	Kong Fansen
1998 (21st)	Ge You	The Dream Factory	Yao Yuan
1999 (22nd)	Zhao Benshan	Male Sorority Director	Liu Yiben
2000 (23rd)	Pan Changjiang	I'll Love You More Tomorrow	Hao Sanduo
2001 (24th)	Wang Qingxiang	Fatal Decision	Li Gaocheng
2002 (25th)	Ge You	Big Shot's Funeral	You You
2003 (26th)	Lu Qi	Deng Xiaoping	Deng Xiaoping
2004 (27th)	Ge You	Cell Phone	Yan Shouyi

=== Since 2006 ===
Year	Actor	Film	Character
2006; 28th	Wu Jun	Zhang Side	Zhang Side
2006; 28th	Jackie Chan	New Police Story	Chan Kwok-wing
2006; 28th	Jet Li	Fearless	Huo Yuanjia
2006; 28th	Stephen Chow	Kung Fu Hustle	Sing
2006; 28th	Song Guofeng	Between Life and Death	Niu Yuru
2008; 29th	Zhang Hanyu	Assembly	Gu Zidi
2008; 29th	Jet Li	The Warlords	Pang Qingyun
2008; 29th	Guo Tao	Crazy Stone	Bao Shihong
2008; 29th	Chen Kun	The Knot	Chen Qiushui
2008; 29th	Damian Lau	The Tokyo Trial	Mei Ju-ao
2010; 30th	Chen Kun	Painted Skin	Wang Sheng
2010; 30th	Zhang Guoli	The Founding of a Republic	Chiang Kai-shek
2010; 30th	Donnie Yen	Ip Man	Ip Man
2010; 30th	Hou Yong	Stands Still, the Last Great Wall	Tang Xinsheng
2010; 30th	Huang Xiaoming	The Message	Takeda
2012; 31st	Wen Zhang	Love Is Not Blind	Wang Xiaojian
2012; 31st	Simon Yam	Echoes of the Rainbow	Mr. Law
2012; 31st	Chen Kun	Flying Swords of Dragon Gate	Yu Huatian
2012; 31st	Li Xuejian	Yang Shanzhou	Yang Shanzhou
2012; 31st	Winston Chao	1911	Sun Yat-sen
2014; 32nd	Huang Xiaoming	American Dreams in China	Cheng Dongqing
2014; 32nd	Xu Zheng	Lost in Thailand	Xu Lang
2014; 32nd	Wu Xiubo	Finding Mr. Right	Hao Zhi
2014; 32nd	Nick Cheung	The White Storm	Cheung Tsz-wai
2014; 32nd	Jackie Chan	CZ12	JC
2016; 33rd	Feng Shaofeng	Wolf Totem	Chen Zhen
2016; 33rd	Feng Xiaogang	Mr. Six	Mr. Six
2016; 33rd	Jing Boran	Monster Hunt	Song Tianyin
2016; 33rd	Deng Chao	The Dead End	Xin Xiaofeng
2016; 33rd	Huang Bo	Dearest	Tian Wenjun
2018; 34th	Wu Jing	Wolf Warrior 2	Leng Feng
2018; 34th	Zhu Yawen	The Founding of an Army	Zhou Enlai
2018; 34th	Liu Haoran	Detective Chinatown 2	Qin Feng
2018; 34th	Zhang Yi	Operation Red Sea	Yang Rui
2018; 34th	Zhang Hanyu	Operation Mekong	Gao Gang
2020; 35th	Huang Xiaoming	The Bravest	Jiang Liwei
2020; 35th	Xiao Yang	Sheep Without a Shepherd	Lee Weijie
2020; 35th	Chow Yun-fat	Project Gutenberg	Ng Fuk-sang / Painter / HKP driver Ng Chi-fai
2020; 35th	Zhang Yi	My People, My Country	Gao Yuan
2020; 35th	Zhang Hanyu	The Captain	Liu Changjian
2022; 36th	Zhang Yi	Cliff Walkers	Zhang Xianchen
2022; 36th	Liu Ye	Island Keeper	Wang Jicai
2022; 36th	Shen Teng	My Country, My Parents	Xing Yihao
2022; 36th	Wu Jing	The Battle at Lake Changjin	Wu Qianli
2022; 36th	Jackson Yee	Nice View	Jing Hao
2024; 37th	Zhu Yilong	Lighting Up the Stars	Mo Sanmei
2024; 37th	Andy Lau	The Wandering Earth 2	Tu Hengyu
2024; 37th	Lay Zhang	No More Bets	Pan Sheng
2024; 37th	Jackson Yee	Full River Red	Sun Jun
2024; 37th	Wang Junkai	Home Coming	Cheng Lang

== Records ==
Items	Name	Statistics	Notes
Most win	Ge You	3 wins	
Youngest Winner	Jiang Wen	Age 24	for Hibiscus Town
Youngest Nominee	Liu Haoran	Age 21	for Detective Chinatown 2

=== Multiple awards for Best Actor ===
3 awards

- Ge You

2 awards

- Yang Zaibao
- Li Rentang
- Jiang Wen
- Gu Yue

=== Multiple awards for Best Actor and Best Supporting Actor combined ===
4 awards

- Ge You (Three awards for Best Actor, one award for Best Supporting Actor)

3 awards

- Ge You (Three awards for Best Supporting Actor)

2 awards

- Yang Zaibao (Two awards for Best Actor)
- Li Rentang (Two awards for Best Actor)
- Jiang Wen (Two awards for Best Actor)
- Li Baotian (One awards for Best Actor, one award for Best Supporting Actor)
- Gu Yue (Two awards for Best Actor)
- Sun Feihu (Two awards for Best Supporting Actor)
