= The Captain (2019 film) =

2019 Chinese-Hong Kong film by Andrew Lau

- Film poster

Chinese name
- Traditional Chinese: 中國機長
- Simplified Chinese: 中国机长
- Literal meaning: China's Captain
Transcriptions
Standard Mandarin
- Hanyu Pinyin: Zhōngguó Jīzhǎng
- Directed by: Andrew Lau
- Written by: Yu Yonggan
- Produced by: Peggy Lee; Andrew Lau
- Starring: Zhang Hanyu; Oho Ou; Du Jiang; Yuan Quan; Zhang Tian'ai; Li Qin
- Cinematography: Andrew Lau; Edmond Fung
- Edited by: Azrael Chung; Sun Chi-man; Li Jianxiang
- Music by: Chan Kwong-wing; Chen Zhiyi
- Production companies: Bona Film Group; Alibaba Pictures; Huaxia Film Distribution
- Distributed by: Bona Film Group
- Release date: 30 September 2019 (China)
- Running time: 111 minutes
- Countries: China; Hong Kong
- Language: Mandarin
- Box office: $418 million

The Captain (Chinese: 中国机长) is a 2019 disaster adventure drama film co-produced, co-cinematographed and directed by Andrew Lau, which stars Zhang Hanyu, Oho Ou, Du Jiang, Yuan Quan, Zhang Tian'ai, Li Qin, Zhang Yamei, and Yang Qiru. The film is based on the Sichuan Airlines Flight 8633 incident. A Chinese-Hong Kong co-production, the film was released in China on September 30, 2019 and received generally positive reviews.

== Synopsis ==
While performing a flight mission, the crew of Sichuan Airlines flight 8633 suddenly encountered an extremely rare danger when the cockpit windshield glass burst and fell off at an altitude of 10,000 meters, causing the cabin to depressurize. The crew struggled to manually pilot the aircraft with very few instruments still in working order. When cabin pressure relief occurs, the flight crew immediately implements pressure relief procedures, instructs passengers to use oxygen masks, and shouts out in a trained manner: "Please believe in us, believe that we have the confidence and ability to lead everyone to a safe landing." At the critical moment of life and death, the handling of the heroic crew ensured the safety of all personnel on board and created a miracle in the history of world civil aviation.

== Cast ==
- Zhang Hanyu as Senior Captain Liu Changjian
- Oho Ou as First Officer Xu Yichen
- Du Jiang as Captain Liang Dong
- Yuan Quan as Senior Purser Bi Nan
- Zhang Tian'ai as Huang Jia
- Li Qin as Zhou Yawen
- Zhang Yamei as Zhang Qiuyue
- Yang Qiru as Yang Hui
- Gao Ge as Wu Yan

=== Cameos ===
- Huang Zhizhong
- Xiao Ai
- Li Xian
- Zhu Yawen
- Chen Shu
- Kan Qingzi
- Jiao Junyan
- Angelababy
- Guan Xiaotong
- Meng Ziyi
- Wu Yue
- Zhang Xiaoqian
- Feng Wenjuan
- Yu Kailei
- Li Mincheng
- Yu Jieping
- Yu Shibin
- Li Xinlin
- Zhang Lei

== Production ==
=== Background ===
On 14 May 2018, Flight 8633 took off from Chongqing Jiangbei International Airport at 6:25 CST (22:25 UTC). Approximately 40 minutes after departure while over Xiaojin County, Sichuan at the altitude of 9 km, the right front segment of the windshield separated from the aircraft followed by an uncontrolled decompression. As a result of the sudden decompression, the flight control unit was damaged, and the loud external noise made spoken communications impossible. The co-pilot however, was able to use the transponder to squawk 7700, alerting Chengdu Shuangliu International Airport control about their situation. Because the flight was within a mountainous region, the pilots were unable to descend to the required 8,000 ft (2,400 m) to compensate for the loss of cabin pressure.

About 35 minutes later, the jetliner made an emergency landing at 7:42 CST (23:42 UTC) at Chengdu Shuangliu International Airport. The aircraft was overweight on landing. As a result, the plane took a longer distance to come to a stop and the tires burst.

Despite wearing a seatbelt, first officer Xu was partially sucked out of the aircraft. He suffered facial abrasions, a minor right eye injury and a sprained wrist. One of the flight attendants on the aircraft, Zhou Yanwen (周彦雯), also suffered a wrist injury after a large gust of wind from the cockpit caused her to fly to the roof of the cabin and land on the floor. She received treatment. Owing to the insulation design of the Airbus A319, the temperature did not drop immediately for the passengers, despite the cockpit's exposure to the outside environment, saving them from frostbite. The flight crew remained conscious and did not experience asphyxia or frostbite. No other crew member or passenger was injured.

=== Pre-production ===
On August 8, 2018, the National Film Board publicly released the late July Chinese film script (synopsis) for the record and project approval. Bona Film Group, main production company and distributor for the film, applied for filing of the film "The Captain," with scriptwriter Yu Yonggan. Its review status was "agreed to shoot in principle." On November 16, the crew onboard Sichuan Airlines Flight 8633 flew again for the first time after the incident, on Sichuan Airlines Flight 8883. Director Andrew Lau, producer Peggy Lee and two stars, Zhang Hanyu and Yuan Quan, also took this flight and witnessed this special moment together with Liu Chuanjian and all members of the "CAAC hero crew." Lau said in an exclusive interview that the selection criteria for extras were quite strict. Individuals with diseases such as hypertension and heart disease were not allowed to participate in the film.

The film was shot with the support and assistance of the CAAC. Under the coordination and organization of the China Civil Aviation Promotion and Education Center, hundreds of professionals from various departments of the civil aviation system participated in the production and shooting of the film. Zhang Hanyu, Yuan Quan and other casts went to the location of the incident to collect information, met with those who were involved in the event, and listened to the hero crew to envision the situation. To make the real "flying experience" available for the big screen audience, Bona Film Group invested nearly 30 million yuan in building a 1:1 airbus A319 simulator, used a motion platform to simulate the bumpiness and dizziness caused by the plane falling sharply at the height of 9800 meters, and brought in the Hollywood team who produced special effects for big Hollywood films such as Star Wars, Captain America, and Thor 3.

The cast all received specialized training before shooting. Zhang Hanyu, Oho Ou and Du Jiang, who played the role as pilots, completed specialized training for professional pilots. Yuan Quan, Zhang Tianai, Li Qin, Zhang Yamei and Yang Qiru also received all-round training from theory to practice. To play the role, Oho Ou had to wear three hours of makeup with special effects to depict his character's injury after the accident. His right eye was almost entirely covered by special effects makeup. By the end of the shooting, his facial allergy was severe, with many small red rashes on his face, but he still insisted on shooting. The "flying trio" of Zhang Hanyu, Ou Hao and Du Jiang learned theory in the classroom in the morning and practiced the plane driving skills in the simulation cabin in the afternoon in order to understand their characters' experience.

=== Filming ===
The Captain was supported and assisted by the Civil Aviation Administration of China, included hundreds of professionals from the civil aviation system participated in the film development and filming process.

Shooting began on January 3, 2019 and ended on March 4, 2019. Filming began at Wuxi and on February 17, the film was transferred to be shot in Chengdu. Filming concluded in Lhasa, Tibet.

== Release ==
The first poster was released on May 5, 2019 and the first official trailer was released on August 5, 2019. The film premiered in Beijing on September 25, 2019 with wide-release in China on September 30, 2019.

The Captain was the opening night film at the 15th Chinese American Film and TV Festival in Los Angeles where it won Best Feature Film. Yu Dong also won Best Producer.

Country	Date of Release
China	September 30, 2019
New Zealand	September 30, 2019
Australia	September 30, 2019
Malaysia	September 30, 2019
Ireland	October 4, 2019
Britain	October 4, 2019

== Reception ==
=== Box-office ===
On October 3, 2019, the box office of The Captain collected another 263 million yuan in one day, and the cumulative box office exceeded 1 billion yuan.

The Captain grossed 55.15 million yuan (around 7.80 million U.S. dollars) on the second to last day of its presale.

=== Critical response ===
The film received a 75% rating on Rotten Tomatoes based on eight critical reviews, with an average rating of 5.5/10.

== Soundtrack ==
"The Wild Goose That Flies Far" Singer: Alan

"I Love the Blue Sky of the Motherland" Singer: Mao Amin

"Soaring In the Sky" Singer: Hu Xia

"Fearless" Singer: Gao Ge
