= List of railway stations in Zhejiang =

Railway transport is the principal means of transportation in China, with over 1.2 billion railway trips taken each year. The following is a list of railway stations in Zhejiang (浙江) Province, China. The top 20 stations (ordered by the number of trains passing through the station) are marked in the "Notes" column.

| Station Name | Chinese Name | Notes |
|---|---|---|
| Chang'anzhen | 长安镇 | |
| Changxing | 长兴 | #18 |
| Deqing | 德清 | #20 |
| Haining | 海宁 | #9 |
| Hangzhou | 杭州 | #1 |
| Hangzhou East | 杭州东 | |
| Huzhou | 湖州 | |
| Jiashan | 嘉善 | #19 |
| Jiangshan | 江山 | |
| Jiaxing | 嘉兴 | #3 |
| Jinhua South | 金华南 | |
| Jinhua West | 金华西 | |
| Jinyun | 缙云 | #16 |
| Lanxi | 兰溪 | |
| Linping | 临平 | |
| Lishui | 丽水 | #11 |
| Longquan | 龙泉 | |
| Longyou | 龙游 | |
| Meishan | 眉山 | |
| Ningbo | 宁波 | #6 |
| Pujiang | 浦江 | |
| Qingtian | 青田 | #14 |
| Quzhou | 衢州 | #4 |
| Shangyu | 上虞 | #10 |
| Shaoxing | 绍兴 | #7 |
| Wenzhou | 温州 | #12 |
| Wuyi | 武义 | #15 |
| Xiaoshan | 萧山 | #17 |
| Yiwu | 义乌 | #2 |
| Yongkang | 永康 | #13 |
| Yuyao | 余姚 | #8 |
| Zhuji | 诸暨 | #5 |
