= Moscow Mission (2023 film) =

2023 Chinese-Hong Kong film by Herman Yau

- Theatrical release poster
- Simplified Chinese: 莫斯科行动
- Traditional Chinese: 莫斯科行動
- Hanyu Pinyin: Mòsīkē Xíngdòng
- Directed by: Herman Yau
- Written by: Chen Daming
- Produced by: Han Sanping; Andy Lau
- Starring: Zhang Hanyu; Andy Lau; Huang Xuan; Janice Man
- Cinematography: Chen Guanghong
- Edited by: Azrael Chung Wai-Chiu
- Music by: Mak Chun Hung
- Production companies: China Media Capital; Alibaba Pictures; AMTD Digital
- Distributed by: CMC Pictures
- Release dates: 29 September 2023 (China); 25 January 2024 (Hong Kong)
- Running time: 128 minutes
- Countries: China; Hong Kong
- Language: Mandarin
- Box office: $92.9 million

Moscow Mission (Chinese: 莫斯科行动) is a 2023 crime action film produced by Han Sanping and Andy Lau and directed by Herman Yau. A co-production between China and Hong Kong, the film is based on the China-Russia Train Robbery happened in 1993. It stars Zhang Hanyu, Andy Lau, Huang Xuan, and Janice Man. The film follows the story of a cross-border manhunt after criminals from several gangs conspired and committed robbery and rape on a Moscow-bound train from Beijing. The film was theatrically released on 29 September 2023 in China.

== Cast ==
- Zhang Hanyu as Cui Zhenhai, a Chinese police officer.
- Andy Lau as Vasily, formerly known as Liu Yuhu.
- Huang Xuan as Miao Qingshan, bandit leader, brother of Miao Ziwen. The main antagonist of the film
- Janice Man as Li Suzhen
- Gu Jiacheng as Miao Ziwen, Miao Qingshan's younger brother. The secondary antagonist of the film
- Zhang Benyu as Yicuomao, a robber.
- Shang Yuxian as Zhao Na, a robber.
- Xu Xiaosa as Li Fang
- Mickey He as Li Jian
- Zhao Bingrui
- Baina Risu
- Wen Zhonghua as a Chinese criminal police officer.

== Production ==
Shooting began on 1 August 2022 and took place in various locations including Oriental Movie Metropolis and Harbin and wrapped on October 11.

== Release ==
The film premiered in Beijing on 26 September 2023 with wide-release in China on 29 September 2023.

== Reception ==
Douban, a major Chinese media rating site, gave the film 6.0 out of 10.

== Box office ==
The film grossed 664 million yuan in Chinese box office.
