= Du Jiang (actor) =

Chinese actor

- 杜江
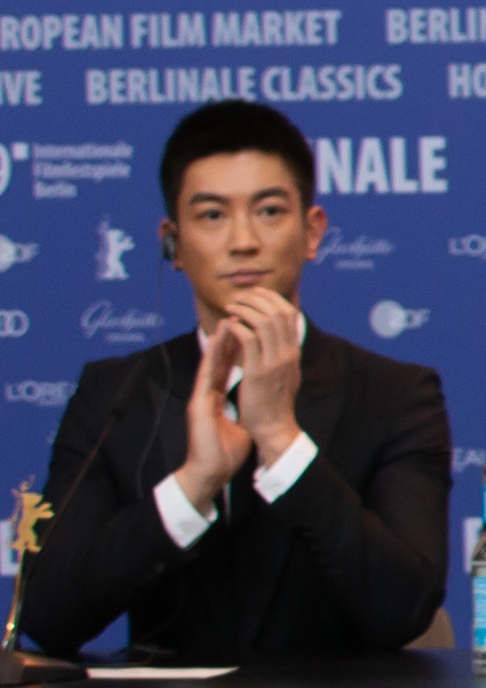
- Du in 2019
- Born: 10 September 1985 (age 40); Jinan, Shandong, China
- Education: Shanghai Theatre Academy
- Occupation: Actor
- Years active: 2007–present
- Political party: Chinese Communist Party
- Spouse: Huo Siyan (m. 2013)
- Children: 1

Du Jiang (Chinese: 杜江; pinyin: Dù Jiāng; born 10 September 1985) is a Chinese actor best known for his role in Operation Red Sea.

== Biography ==
Du was born into a working-class family in Jinan, Shandong, on 10 September 1985. In 2004, he enrolled at Shanghai Theatre Academy, where he studied alongside Chen He and Zheng Kai.

Du made his television debut with a supporting role in Rich Man Poor Love (2007). That same year, his first film role came with the Empire of Silver, alongside Aaron Kwok, Hao Lei, and Zhang Tielin.

In 2012, Du starred opposite Wang Zhiwen and Zhang Guoli in Green Porcelain. He played a supporting role in Beijing Youth, a romance television series starring Li Chen, Ma Su and Du Chun.

In 2017, Du had a supporting role in Game of Hunting, a commercial war themed television series starring Hu Ge, Jian Renzi, and Wan Qian.

In 2018, Du had a supporting role in Operation Red Sea, a financial success that took in US$579.2 million at the box office worldwide,
(CN¥3.65 billion) and won Best Supporting Actor Awards at the 34th Hundred Flowers Awards and 1st Hainan Island International Film Festival.

In 2019, for his role in The Bravest, Du was nominated for the Best Supporting Actor at the 11th Macau International Film Festival. The same year, he has appeared in a variety of films, including roles in So Long, My Son, My People, My Country, The Captain, Mao Zedong 1949 and Chasing the Dragon II: Wild Wild Bunch.

== Personal life ==
In early 2012, Du was introduced to Huo Siyan by someone and announced their relationship on her birthday in October of the same year. The following year, they got married and had a son.

== Filmography ==
=== Film ===
Year	English title	Chinese title	Role	Ref.
2009	Empire of Silver	白银帝国	Fourth Master	
2011	Shanghai Diary	上海日记	Quan Xiaoliang	
2011		谍影柔情	Yoshiaki Eguchi	
2016	Mr. High Heels	高跟鞋先生	Hang Yuan / Hang Wen	
2016	The Wasted Times	罗曼蒂克消亡史	Ma Zai	
2018	Operation Red Sea	红海行动	Xu Hong	
2018	Last Letter	你好，之华	Zhou Wentao	
2019	So Long, My Son	地久天长	Shen Hao	
2019	Chasing the Dragon II: Wild Wild Bunch	追龙II：贼王	Zhou Wentao	
2019	My People, My Country	我和我的祖国	Zhu Tao	
2019	The Captain	中国机长	Liang Dong	
2019	Mao Zedong 1949	决胜时刻	San Tuanzhang	
2019	The Bravest	烈火英雄	Ma Weiguo	
2021	My Country, My Parents	我和我的父辈	natural father	
2023	Flashover	惊天救援	Han Kai	
2023	Lost in the Stars	消失的她	Zheng Chen	
2024		来都来了	Wang Yao	
2025	Operation Leviathan	蛟龙行动	Xu Hong	

=== Television ===
Year	English title	Chinese title	Role	Ref.
2007	Rich Man Poor Love	钻石王老五的艰难爱情	Hao Liang	
2009	Sinful Debt 2	孽债2	An Yonghui	
2010		全家福	Jun Feng	
2011	Men	男人帮	Wang Nan	
2012	Green Porcelain	青瓷	Xu Yi	
2012	Beijing Youth	北京青年	Gao Jun	
2013		老米家的婚事	Zhen Yu	
2013	Protect Love Fearlessly	爱情面前谁怕谁	Mi Ni	
2014	The Young Doctor	青年医生	Zhao Chong	
2015		草帽警察	Shen Yongnian	
2016		再见，老婆大人	Zhao Tiancai	
2017	Game of Hunting	猎场	Kai Wenyang	
2018		烽火连城决	Lin Hai	
2024	Shangganling	上甘岭	Li Desheng	
TBA	Finding Mr. Right	北京遇上西雅图	Lin Nuoyan	

== Awards and nominations ==
Year	Nominated work	Award	Category	Result	Ref.
2018	Operation Red Sea	34th Hundred Flowers Awards	Best Supporting Actor	Won	
2018	Operation Red Sea	1st Hainan Island International Film Festival	Best Supporting Actor	Won	
2019	The Bravest	11th Macau International Film Festival	Best Supporting Actor	Nominated	
