= John Fred Cruz =

John F. Cruz
- 墨弘
- Born: 1957 (age 68–69); Green River, Wyoming, U.S.
- Other names: Mo Hong
- Occupation: Actor
- Years active: 1981–present
- Known for: Portraying Oliver P. Smith in The Battle at Lake Changjin

John Fred Cruz (born 1957) is an American technologist and actor. He founded ImageMind Software, which developed digital video technologies for personal computers in the 1990s. In his later career, he began acting in Chinese films under the stage name Mo Hong (墨弘) and is known for his portrayal of U.S. General Oliver P. Smith in the film The Battle at Lake Changjin (2021).

== Early life and education ==
John F. Cruz was born in 1957 in Green River, Wyoming. He attended the University of Utah in the late 1970s, initially majoring in computer science. He later designed an interdisciplinary degree titled Analysis of Computer-Based Business Systems under the Bachelor of University Studies program, combining computer science and business coursework. He graduated in 1981 with a Bachelor of University Studies degree.

== Career ==
After graduation, Cruz worked as a project manager for Norand Systems in Colorado. He designed a computerized point-of-sale (POS) system for Pizza Hut using networked fiber-optic technology. The system was later sold to Pizza Hut's parent company, PepsiCo, for $40 million. In 1987, he founded the consulting firm Digital Performance, Inc., which contracted information-systems analysis and design projects for Utah state government agencies.

In 1994, Cruz founded ImageMind Software, Inc. in Salt Lake City to develop digital video software. He developed software that enabled full-screen video playback on standard PCs without requiring special hardware accelerators. He also developed the Full Screen Video Screen Saver (1994) and a subsequent version created with the Discovery Channel, which was named "Screen Saver of the Month" by Windows Magazine in 1995. Other software he developed included Video Express Viewer (1996), a universal media player, and Video Express Email (1997), an application for sending streaming video embedded within email messages. ImageMind ceased operations in 2000.

In the mid-2010s, Cruz began an acting career in the Chinese film industry, relocating to China around 2016 and adopting the stage name Mo Hong (墨弘). He portrayed U.S. Major General Oliver P. Smith in the war film The Battle at Lake Changjin (2021) and its sequel Water Gate Bridge (2022). The Battle at Lake Changjin became the highest-grossing film in Chinese box-office history at the time of its release.

His other roles in Chinese productions include appearances in the historical film Diplomatic Situation (2019), the action film Ip Man 4: The Finale (2019), and the upcoming aviation film China's Big Plane.

== Filmography ==
- Sarah Cain (2007)
- The Battle at Lake Changjin (2021)
- Water Gate Bridge (2022)
- Ip Man 4: The Finale (2019)
- Diplomatic Situation (2019)
- China's Big Plane (upcoming)
