= The Battle at Lake Changjin =

2021 film by Chen Kaige, Tsui Hark and Dante Lam

- Theatrical release poster
- Traditional Chinese: 長津湖
- Simplified Chinese: 长津湖
- Literal meaning: Changjin Lake
- Hanyu Pinyin: Chángjīn hú
- Directed by: Chen Kaige; Tsui Hark; Dante Lam
- Written by: Lan Xiaolong; Huang Jianxin
- Produced by: Yu Dong; Nansun Shi; Chen Kaige; Tsui Hark; Dante Lam; Candy Leung; Jiang Defu; Chen Hong
- Starring: Wu Jing; Jackson Yee; Duan Yihong; Zhang Hanyu; Zhu Yawen; Li Chen; Hu Jun
- Cinematography: Pan Luo; Peter Pau
- Edited by: Tsui Hark; Li Dianshi; He Yongyi
- Music by: Zhiyi Wang; Elliot Leung
- Production companies: Beijing Bona Film Group Co., Ltd.; August First Film Studio; Huaxia Film Distribution; China Film Co., Ltd.; Shanghai Film Group; Alibaba Pictures; Beijing Dengfeng International Culture Communications Company
- Distributed by: Distribution Workshop; CMC Pictures
- Release dates: 21 September 2021 (BIFF); 30 September 2021 (China); 11 November 2021 (Singapore)
- Running time: 178 minutes
- Country: China
- Languages: Mandarin; English
- Budget: US$200 million
- Box office: CN¥5.77 billion (US$913 million)

The Battle at Lake Changjin (Chinese: 长津湖) is a 2021 Chinese war drama film produced and directed by Chen Kaige, Tsui Hark and Dante Lam, written by Lan Xiaolong and Huang Jianxin, and starring Wu Jing and Jackson Yee. It was commissioned by the Central Propaganda Department of the Chinese Communist Party as part of the Party's 100th anniversary celebrations. The film depicts the story of the North Korea-allied Chinese People's Volunteer Army, forcing U.S. forces to withdraw in a fictionalized retelling of the Battle of the Chosin Reservoir during the Korean War.

The Battle at Lake Changjin is the most expensive film ever produced in China, with a budget of $200 million. The film grossed $913 million at the worldwide box office, making it the second-highest-grossing film of 2021. It surpassed Wolf Warrior 2, becoming the highest-grossing Chinese film of all time and the highest-grossing non-English film. On 5 February 2025, The Battle at Lake Changjin was surpassed by Ne Zha 2, which became the highest-grossing Chinese film of all time, the highest-grossing non-English film, and the highest-grossing film in a single market. A sequel to the film, The Battle at Lake Changjin II, was released on 1 February 2022.

The film's depiction of the battle has been described as containing historical inaccuracies and has garnered controversy in some countries, including South Korea. The film has also been described as propaganda.

== Plot ==
Wu Qianli, commander of the People's Liberation Army's 7th Company, returns home after the Chinese Civil War. He informs his family that his brother, Wu Baili, was killed in action. Having been granted land for his service, he promises his parents he will build them a house. However, his leave gets canceled when China enters the Korean War. Qianli's younger brother, Wanli, asks to join him but is denied.

On September 15, 1950, during the Battle of Incheon, U.S. aircraft are shown indiscriminately bombing a village in Andong Province, China. In Beijing, on October 4, 1950, the Politburo of the Chinese Communist Party is convened in Zhongnanhai to discuss the war effort. Mao Zedong questions whether the U.S. crossing the 38th parallel indicates an intention to cross the Yalu River after the U.S. has occupied Taiwan, and the U.S. military presence in Korea poses a threat to China's security.

To Qianli's dismay, Wanli has joined the 7th Company and is now stationed there. During their journey to Korea, Wanli faces harassment from his fellow soldiers, with Qianli initially refusing to help or even provide him with a rifle. The train is bombed while tracks are being repaired, forcing the 7th Company to march on foot, avoiding American aircraft. They come across a battle and assist a group of Chinese soldiers. Wanli and Qianli narrowly escape a tank attack. The 7th Company continues toward the front lines, eventually arriving with important equipment like field radios.

Mao Zedong's son, Anying, known by the pseudonym "Liu," joins the Chinese soldiers and remains hidden in the mountains, running low on supplies and enduring below-freezing temperatures, while U.S. radio detection locates the headquarters where Anying is stationed, prompting aircraft to bomb the base. Most staff shelter in bunkers, but Anying rushes back to retrieve a map and is killed in the bombing.

On 27 November, the Chinese launch an attack, overwhelming the U.S. Army 31st Infantry at Sinhung-ni. The Americans begin to retreat as Qianli shoots the U.S. commander, Colonel Allan MacLean, but Wanli intervenes to prevent his execution. Reinforcements are sent to Sinhung-ni from Hagaru-ri. A USMC Vought F4U Corsair strikes Chinese forces, marking the overrun base with smoke, but is shot down by a bazooka-wielding Chinese soldier. Lei Suisheng places the smoke marker on a jeep and drives away, linking up with the U.S. retreating column. U.S. bombers then destroy the column, and Lei is killed in the attack.

Hagaru-ri is under attack by Chinese forces, and Yang Gensi commits a suicidal attack on American tanks with a satchel charge. The retreating U.S. Marine column encounters a group of Chinese soldiers frozen at their posts. General Oliver P. Smith salutes them; his voiceover states that fighting such determined men meant the U.S. was unlikely to win. The final scenes show a U.S. mass grave at Hungnam as the city burns during the Hungnam evacuation. In the aftermath, 105,000 U.S. troops were evacuated by December 24, and the 9th Corps captured Hungnam. The Battle of Lake Changjin is an example of successfully destroying a U.S. reinforced regiment, and of how Chinese forces managed to repel U.S. advances and aiding Korea, despite heavy Chinese casualties.

== Cast ==
- Wu Jing as Wu Qianli, commander of the 7th Company.
- Jackson Yee as Wu Wanli, Artillery Platoon soldier of the 7th Company, younger brother of Wu Qianli.
- Kevin Lee as Colonel Allan MacLean, commanding officer 31st Infantry Regiment ("Polar Bears").
- John Fred Cruz as Major General Oliver P. Smith, commanding general 1st Marine Division.
- C.T./Gao Mingyu Evans as Major General Edward Almond, commanding general X Corps.
- Duan Yihong as Tan Ziwei, commander of the 3rd Battalion.
- Zhu Yawen as Mei Sheng, political instructor of the 7th Company.
- Li Chen as Yu Congrong, leader of Fire Platoon of the 7th Company.
- Hu Jun as Lei Suisheng, leader of the Artillery (Mortar) Platoon of the 7th Company.
- Elvis Han as Ping He, a sniper in the 7th Company.
- Shi Pengyuan as Zhang Xiaoshan, a young soldier of the 7th Company who befriends Wanli; Xiaoshan's actor was 15 years old at the time of filming.
- Zhang Hanyu as Song Shilun, deputy commander of the People's Volunteer Army, commander and political commissar of the PVA 9th Army.
- Huang Xuan as Mao Anying, son of Mao Zedong, secretary for the People's Volunteer Army Headquarters.
- Oho Ou as Yang Gensi, commander of 3rd Company of 172nd Regiment of 58th Division of the 20th Corps.
- James Filbird as Douglas MacArthur, Commander in chief of the United Nations Command.
- Tang Guoqiang as Mao Zedong, chairman of the Chinese Communist Party, chairman of the Central People's Government Commission and chairman of the People's Revolutionary Military Commission of the Central People's Government.
- Zhou Xiaobin as Peng Dehuai, commander and political commissar of the People's Volunteer Army, vice chairman of the People's Revolutionary Military.
- Lin Yongjian as Deng Hua, first deputy commander and first deputy political commissar of the People's Volunteer Army.
- Wang Wufu as Zhu De, secretary of Secretariat of the Chinese Communist Party, vice chairman of the Central People's Government Commission and vice chairman of the People's Revolutionary Military Commission of the Central People's Government.
- Liu Sha as Liu Shaoqi, secretary of Secretariat of the Chinese Communist Party, vice chairman of the Central People's Government Commission and vice chairman of the People's Revolutionary Military Commission of the Central People's Government.
- Liu Jing as Zhou Enlai, secretary of Secretariat of the Chinese Communist Party, premier of the People's Republic of China, foreign minister and vice chairman of the People's Revolutionary Military Commission of the Central People's Government.
- Lu Qi as Deng Xiaoping, vice chairman of the Southwest Military Administrative Committee and political commissar of Southwest Military Region.

== Production ==
The story of The Battle at Lake Changjin was commissioned by the National Radio and Television Administration, the Central Military Commission and the propaganda department of the Chinese Communist Party in Beijing, Hebei and Liaoning. The film was produced by Polybona Films. The screenplay was written by Lan Xiaolong, who previously wrote the novel Soldiers Sortie and its TV drama adaptation, and Huang Jianxin. In February 2020, it was reported that Andrew Lau had been offered the job of directing the film, but he was hired to direct Chinese Doctors instead; Chen Kaige, Tsui Hark and Dante Lam were later hired to direct the film. The Battle at Lake Changjin is one of the most expensive films ever made, with a production budget of over US$200 million.

Shooting began in Beijing on 25 October 2020, and ended on 25 May 2021. 70,000 People's Liberation Army soldiers acted as extras.

Part of the film was shot in Zhangjiakou, and part was shot on location in Zhejiang. The scene of the People's Volunteer Army boarding trucks to North Korea was filmed at Meishan railway station in Huzhou. Parts of the scenes were filmed in Lishimen Reservoir.

== Music ==
No.	Title	Lyrics	Music	Singer	Length
1.	"The Most Lovely People (最可爱的人)" (Opening theme)	Qing Yan	Liu Zhaolun (Qing Sang)	Jane Zhang	4:49
2.	"Heroic Odes (英雄赞歌)" (Ending theme)	Gong Mu	Liu Chi	Zhuang Yinan, Cai Yutong, Liang Ruiyang, Peng Youxin, Galaxy Youth TV Art Troupe
3.	"Canzonet of Yimeng Mountain (沂蒙山小调)" (Interlude)
4.	"Lake Changjin (长津湖)" (Theme Song)	Zhang Heping	Feng Xiaoquan, Feng Tianyi	Liu Huan	3:55

== Release ==
On 26 July 2021, the producers announced that the film was scheduled for release on 12 August 2021. On 5 August, the producers announced that the film was postponed due to the COVID-19 pandemic in China.

The film was selected to be the opening film of the 11th Beijing International Film Festival and premiered on 21 September 2021.

The Battle at Lake Changjin was released on 30 September 2021 in China on IMAX, CINITY, CGS, Dolby Cinema and other formats. It was theatrically released in Hong Kong and Macau on 11 November. It was released in North America, the United Kingdom and Ireland on 19 November, and is scheduled to be released in Australia on 2 December.

== Reception ==
=== Box office ===
The Battle at Lake Changjin has earned a total of CN¥5.77 billion ($913 million). It is the second-highest-grossing film of 2021 and the highest-grossing Chinese film of all time. The film earned a total of $82 million in its first two days of release, and reached 1.012 billion yuan ($155.12 million) on 2 October. By 3 October, it grossed 1.5 billion yuan ($233 million) at the Chinese box office. The film earned a total of 2 billion yuan ($310.3 million) in its first five days. On 6 October, the film grossed over 3 billion yuan ($465.46 million), becoming the 13th film with a box office of more than 3 billion yuan in China's film history.

By the end of its second weekend, it had earned $555.3 million. The film remained atop the Chinese box office for a month, being displaced by No Time to Die during the weekend of 29–31 October. It overtook Wolf Warrior 2 on 24 November to become the highest-grossing film in China. It also became the second highest-grossing film of all time in a single market, after Star Wars: The Force Awakens (2015) in the United States.

On 5 February 2025, The Battle at Lake Changjin was displaced by Ne Zha 2 as the highest-grossing Chinese movie and highest-grossing non-English film of all time.

=== Critical and audience response ===
On the review aggregator website Rotten Tomatoes, 36% of 11 critics' reviews are positive, with an average rating of 5.10/10. Among Chinese ratings sites the movie has received a 9.5 on Maoyan and 7.6 on Douban.

The Global Times, a tabloid of the Chinese Communist Party, said that "the national feeling displayed in the film echoes the rising public sentiment in safeguarding national interests in front of provocations, which has great implications for today's China-US competition."

Film critic Todd McCarthy of Deadline Hollywood in reviewing, said that "Anyone into big-time action cinema on the largest possible screen will more than get their money's worth, even if the film is simplistic and entirely predictable in its goals, both as action and politics. But it doesn't matter how big your screen is at home—if you want to see this at all, see it on a really big screen." Conversely, Phil Hoad of The Guardian gave a two out of five rating, saying the film was a "sporadically thrilling, historically dubious account of a Korean war standoff, with all the subtlety of a rocket launcher."

Reviewing for Forbes, Scott Mendelson said "It's arguably no more jingoistic, at least until the final montage, than (offhand) Pearl Harbor or We Were Soldiers." He further described the film as spectacular with its "copious mass battle sequences and intricate action set pieces" against what was a "pretty dry war picture" and a "generic war actioner" when compared with The Eight Hundred.

Reviewing in The Independent, Louis Chilton wrote that, while it was fair to describe the film as propaganda, the same criticism should be directed at similar American films such as American Sniper or Captain Marvel.

=== Controversies and inaccuracies ===
The movie has been described as propaganda. Sophia Yan of The Daily Telegraph wrote that it is an "anti-US propaganda film" that tapped into a "growing nationalist sentiment", while BBC News described the film as "Chinese propaganda". Stanley Rosen, a political science professor from the University of Southern California, stated that the release and popularity of the film "is definitely related to the ongoing tensions with the US, and has been promoted that way—sometimes indirectly, but still very clearly". Sun Hongyun, an associate professor at Beijing Film Academy said that the film was "an extraordinary and perfect collusion of capital and political propaganda".

CNN noted that the film was commissioned by the propaganda department of the Chinese Communist Party, while Business Insider and The Economist said that the movie was part of a "main melody" genre of entertainment that praises China, the Chinese Communist Party, and the People's Liberation Army.

An article in The New York Times described the film as a government-sponsored movie that appeared to resonate with the Chinese public at a time of tension in the US-China relationship despite "mixed reviews, a torturous running time and technical errors of military history, tapping into nationalistic sentiment that China's leader, Xi Jinping, has nurtured" and underscored the extent to which the Chinese Communist Party was determined to shape popular culture.

Rebecca Davis of Foreign Policy described the film's sequel and companion piece, The Battle at Lake Changjin II, as propaganda that "extol the virtues of sacrificing oneself for the Chinese Communist Party." She further described the film as "plodding, heavy-handed, and preachy", and that although the film "portrays U.S. Gen. Douglas MacArthur as a nuclear-war-hungry boor and spends most of its two-and-a-half-hour run time slaughtering Americans", its subject is "the suffering of Chinese troops, not pure anti-Americanism."

Park Min-hee of The Hankyoreh stated that the film is a part of "political propaganda suggesting that China will fight and ultimately defeat the US" in a new Cold War that began in 2018, she also wrote that "such patriotic propaganda is also intended to control the grievances caused by rising unemployment and inequality". She further criticized China's interpretation of the Korean War, as "by only considering the outcome of the battle for the two superpowers of the US and China, it fails to consider Koreans' position, not to mention their sacrifice. Xi's declaration that China fought a just war in which it resolutely defeated the "intruder" disregards the historical fact that the war was started when North Korea invaded with support from China and the Soviet Union."

The nonprofit Fairness & Accuracy in Reporting stated that there is "no doubt that the film is propaganda" and "a few outlets interjected that the film failed to mention that North Korea had invaded the South first."

US Marine Lieutenant General Richard E. Carey, a veteran of the Battle of Chosin Reservoir, criticized the film as propaganda and a distorted depiction of the battle. Carey said that at Chosin Reservoir, despite being overwhelmingly outnumbered, American forces badly defeated, demoralized and so wounded the Chinese forces, that a legion's worth of men had to withdraw to China to completely regroup and reequip. He described the Battle of Chosin Reservoir as a Chinese defeat. Carey also stated that up to 100,000 Korean refugees were evacuated together with UN troops at Hungnam. In addition, Kim Young-kweon of Voice of America noted that during the battle, US and UN forces suffered significantly fewer casualties than the Chinese.

After the release of the movie, former Chinese journalist Luo Changping was arrested by police and held on the charge of "infringing the reputation and honour of national martyrs" after multiple police reports were filed over his online post in Sina Weibo, where he posted commentary questioning China's role in the Korean War, drawing criticism from thousands of social media users.

The film has been banned in Malaysia, a country where the dissemination of communist ideology is illegal.

Deutsche Welle reported that the film has raised anger in South Korea, with the public calling it "propaganda filled with historical inaccuracies." South Korean former diplomat Ra Jong-yil called the film "nonsense" and "whitewashing" and accused it of attempting to reshape the narrative of events during the Korean War. The reaction raised the possibility that the film would not be distributed in South Korea.

== Awards and nominations ==
Year	Ceremony	Category	Recipient	Results	Ref(s)
2022	40th Hong Kong Film Awards	Best Film Editing	Mak Chi Sin, Li Dianshi, He Yongyi	Nominated	
2022	40th Hong Kong Film Awards	Best Sound Design	Wang Danrong, Steve Burgess, Yin Jie	Nominated	
2022	40th Hong Kong Film Awards	Best Visual Effects	Tsui Hark, Dennis Yeung, Wang Lei	Nominated	

== Sequel ==
A sequel entitled The Battle at Lake Changjin II was released on 1 February 2022, the first day of Chinese New Year. (长津湖之水门桥; cháng jīn hú zhī shuǐ mén qiáo; 'Water Gate Bridge of Lake Changjin'). The movie is about a maneuver undertaken by the PVA in the same campaign to destroy a bridge that was used by the US forces as part of their withdrawal.

== See also ==
- List of highest-grossing films in China
- Highest-grossing films of 2021
- Highest-grossing non-English films
- Military–entertainment complex
