= The Chef, the Actor, the Scoundrel =

- Film poster
- Traditional Chinese: 廚子‧戲子‧痞子
- Simplified Chinese: 厨子‧戏子‧痞子
- Hanyu Pinyin: Chúzi Xìzi Pǐzi
- Directed by: Guan Hu
- Screenplay by: Guan Hu; Dong Runnian
- Produced by: Zhu Wenjiu; Wang Changtian; Zhang Hanyu; Huang Bo; Liu Ye; Guan Hu; Xu Tiejun; Chang Jihong
- Starring: Liu Ye; Zhang Hanyu; Huang Bo
- Cinematography: Du Jie
- Edited by: Kong Jinlei
- Music by: Dou Peng
- Production companies: Beijing No. 5 Movement Culture Media; Enlight Media Group
- Distributed by: Enlight Media Group
- Release date: 29 March 2013 (China)
- Running time: 108 minutes
- Country: China
- Language: Mandarin
- Box office: US$42.97 million

The Chef, the Actor, the Scoundrel is a 2013 Chinese comedy film directed by Guan Hu, starring Liu Ye, Zhang Hanyu and Huang Bo. The film is meant to be "mass entertainment", in the words of Guan, who also co-wrote the screenplay. The film is set in 1942, during the Second Sino-Japanese War. Much of the plot revolves around the fates of two Japanese scientists who are captured in Beiping (Beijing) by the three title characters, who have trouble deciding what to do with them.

== Plot ==
The film is set in China in the 1940s during the Second Sino-Japanese War. The Imperial Japanese Army's Unit 731 conducts experiments on biological weapons by releasing cholera in Beiping, but that inadvertently hinders their advance because their troops are at risk of being infected as well. They block off all access to the city and secretly summon two scientists to handle the situation. The virus spreads outside the city while the people inside the city suffer from hunger.

A scoundrel encounters the two scientists inside Beiping, without knowing who they are, and attempts to rob them. After a short chase through the streets, the scoundrel captures them and brings them to a Japanese restaurant owned by a Chinese chef. An opera actor also lives in the restaurant. The three men are unable to decide what to do with the scientists. The chef wants to release the captives because he is afraid of getting into trouble. The scoundrel wants to get out of the difficult situation so he lies that he is from the Chinese Eighth Route Army. The actor wants to kill the scientists and the scoundrel, because he feels that they would offend the Chinese army if they release the scientists and they would offend the Japanese military if they release the scoundrel.

Just when the three men brandish their weapons at each other and are locked in a stalemate, the chef's wife rummages through the scientists' belongings, finds a canister of cholera, and realises that the scientists are actually sent by Unit 731 to deal with the virus. At this point, the three men come to terms with each other and agree to cooperate and share the gains from selling the canister of cholera. The scoundrel and actor use various methods to interrogate the scientists and gather more information. The chef, who serves as their translator, secretly helps the two scientists.

== Cast ==
- Liu Ye as the Chef
- Zhang Hanyu as the Actor
- Huang Bo as the Scoundrel
- Liang Jing as the Chef's wife
- Takashima Shinichi as Lieutenant Shinichi Sugai (Japanese: 陸軍中尉菅井真一, Rikugun-Chūi Sugai Shin'ichi)
- Otsuka Masanobu as Colonel Goro Ogasawara (Japanese: 陸軍大佐小笠原五郎, Rikugun-Taisa Ogasawara Gorō)
- Tanaka Chie as Second Lieutenant Sakura Yanagida (Japanese: 陸軍少尉柳田咲良, Rikugun-Shōi Yanagida Sakura)
- Wang Xun as Yanjing
- Fei Zhenxiang as Erqiu
- Zhao Suchen as Sanpao
- Minowa Yasufumi as Captain Igarashi (Japanese: 陸軍大尉五十嵐, Rikugun-Tai-i Igarashi)
- Zhang Luyi as Shirakawa
- Hibino Akira as General Kawabe (Japanese: 陸軍大将川辺, Rikugun-Taishō Kawabe)
- Ryu Kohata as Japanese commander
