= Zhang Hanyu =

Chinese actor

- 张涵予
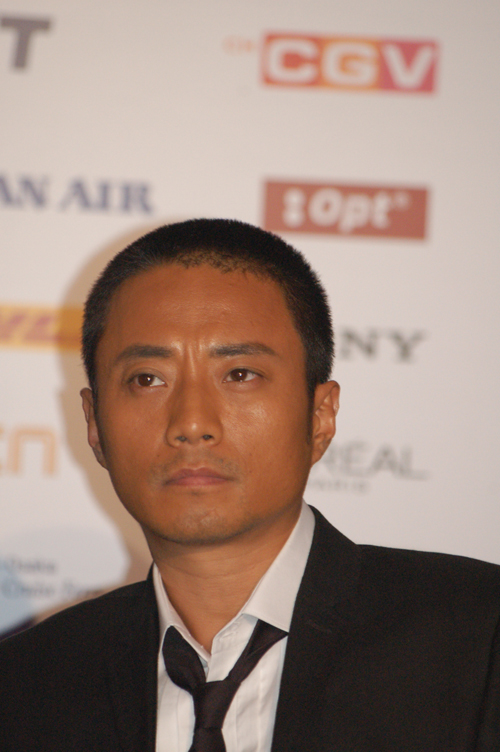
- Zhang in 2007
- Born: 19 December 1964 (age 61); Beijing, China
- Occupation: Actor
- Years active: 1999–present
- Spouse: Yang Meizi (羊梅子)

Chinese name
- Traditional Chinese: 張涵予
- Simplified Chinese: 张涵予
Transcriptions
Standard Mandarin
- Hanyu Pinyin: Zhāng Hányú
Yue: Cantonese
- Jyutping: Zoeng1 Haam4-jyu4

Zhang Hanyu (born 19 December 1964) is a Chinese actor. He rose to fame for his role in the film Assembly (2007), for which he won the Best Actor at the Hundred Flowers Awards, the Golden Horse Film Awards, the Huading Awards and the Huabiao Awards. He is also known for the films The Message (2009), The Chef, the Actor, the Scoundrel (2013), The Taking of Tiger Mountain (2014), Operation Mekong (2016), The Captain (2019), and Chinese Doctors (2021), as well as the television series All Men Are Brothers (2011).

== Life and career ==
Zhang was born in Beijing. He graduated from the Central Academy of Drama in 1988. He started his career as a voice actor for the Chinese dubbings of films such as Shark Tale, The Lord of the Rings trilogy, and Troy. Zhang played minor roles in television series before gaining recognition as a recurring supporting actor in films directed by Feng Xiaogang, such as Sorry Baby, Cell Phone, Big Shot's Funeral, and A World Without Thieves.

Zhang's breakthrough came with his first lead role in Feng's war film Assembly in 2007. The film propelled Zhang to fame and earned him the Best Actor Awards at the Hundred Flowers Awards, the Golden Horse Film Awards, the Huading Awards and the Huabiao Awards, among others.

Zhang followed with films such as Cao Baoping's crime drama The Equation of Love and Death; the espionage thriller The Message; and the action film Bodyguards and Assassins. Zhang also played Zhang Liang in the historical film White Vengeance. In 2012, Zhang teamed up again with Feng Xiaogang in the disaster film Back to 1942, playing a priest.

In 2013, Zhang teamed up with actors Liu Ye and Huang Bo in the comedy film The Chef, the Actor, the Scoundrel directed by Guan Hu, where he plays an opera actor.

In 2014, Zhang starred in Tsui Hark's wuxia film The Taking of Tiger Mountain. Playing an undercover PLA soldier, he won the Golden Rooster Awards for Best Actor. He next starred in the crime film Mr. Six directed by Guan Hu; and had a supporting role in Zhang Yimou's fantasy historical epic The Great Wall.

In 2016, Zhang headlined the crime thriller film Operation Mekong alongside Eddie Peng. The film received critical acclaim, and is the highest grossing Chinese cop film to date.

In 2017, Zhang starred in John Woo's police thriller film, Manhunt. He also starred in Wine War, the directorial debut of Leon Lai.

== Filmography ==
=== Film ===
Year	English title	Chinese title	Role	Notes/Ref.
1999	Sorry Baby	沒完沒了		Cameo
2001	Big Shot's Funeral	大腕		Cameo
2003	Cell Phone	手機	TV director	Cameo
2004	Sleepless City	危情雪夜		Cameo
2004	A World Without Thieves	天下無賊	Police detective	Cameo
2007	Assembly	集結號	Gu Zidi	
2008	The Cold Flame	烽火	Xue Youfang	
2008	The Equation of Love and Death	李米的猜想	Ye Qingcheng	
2009	Look for a Star	游龍戲鳳	Lin Jiu	
2009	The Founding of a Republic	建國大業	Liu Congwen	
2009	The Message	風聲	Wu Zhiguo	
2009	Bodyguards and Assassins	十月圍城	Sun Wen	
2011	Sweet Journey	云下的日子	Long Jianguo	
2011	The Founding of a Party	建黨偉業	Song Jiaoren	
2011	White Vengeance	鴻門宴	Zhang Liang	
2012	Back to 1942	一九四二	Brother Sim	
2013	The Chef, the Actor, the Scoundrel	厨子戏子痞子	Xizi	
2013	Special ID	特殊身份	Blade	
2013	Love You for Loving Me	我爱的是你爱我	Ya Peng	
2014	Ex-Files	前任攻略	Zhao Ming	
2014	The Taking of Tiger Mountain	智取威虎山	Yang Zirong	
2015	Mr. Six	老炮儿	Men San'er	
2016	Operation Mekong	湄公河行动	Gao Gang	
2016	The Great Wall	长城	Commander-in-chief Shao	
2017	Wine War	抢红	Zhang Shui	
2017	The Founding of an Army	建军大业	Du Yuesheng	
2017	Manhunt	追捕	Du Qiu	
2018	Operation Red Sea	红海行动	Gao Yun	
2019	Mao Zedong 1949	决胜时刻	Luo Ruiqing	
2019	The Captain	中国机长	Liu Changjian	
2021	The Battle at Lake Changjin	长津湖	Song Shilun	
2021	Chinese Doctors	中国医生		
2022	The Battle at Lake Changjin II	长津湖之水门桥	Song Shilun	
2023	Moscow Mission	莫斯科行动	Cui Zhenhai	
2025	Operation Hadal	蛟龙行动	Zhao Qihang	
2025	The Legend Hunters	寻龙诀·觅踪	Hu Bayi	

=== Television series ===
Year	English title	Chinese title	Role	Notes/Ref.
1999	Place Where Dreams Begin	夢開始的地方	Song Jianjun	
2000	Pinzui Zhang Damin De Xingfu Shenghuo	貧嘴張大民的幸福生活	Xu Wanjun	
2001	Yixiao Dafang	貽笑大方	Jiang Li	
2003	Change a Lifestyle	換個活法	Ye Xiangchuan	
2003	Guanzhong Daoke Zhi Qicunzi	關中刀客之七寸子		Television film
2004	Family Man	居家男人	Chen Dali	
2005	Dong Shenme, Bie Dong Ganqing	動什麼，別動感情	Wan Zheng	
2005	Recording Tape	錄象帶		Cameo
2006	Lonely Heroes	寂寞英雄	Lin Yajun	
2006	Romantic Life	與青春有關的日子		Cameo
2006	Women's Choices	女人的選擇	Tian Bo	
2008	Fatal 24 Hours III	非常24小時III	Xu Tian	
2009	Proof of Identity	身份的證明	Di Haoming	
2009	The Last 99 Days	最後的99天	Xiao Kun	
2011	All Men Are Brothers	水滸傳	Song Jiang	
2013	Fire Line, Three Brothers	火線三兄弟	Tian Dali	
2013	Aftershock	唐山大地震	Wan Dacheng	
2015		永不低头	Gu Guofu	
TBA	Peace in Palace, Peace in Chang'an	天下长安	Wei Zheng	
TBA	Autumn Cicada	秋蝉	Tan Xiang	
TBA	Against the Light	逆光	Lin Yi	

== Awards and nominations ==
Year	Award	Category	Nominated work	Results	Ref.
2008	45th Golden Horse Film Festival and Awards	Best Actor	Assembly	Won	
2008	15th Beijing College Student Film Festival	Best Actor	Assembly	Won	
2008	8th Chinese Film Media Awards	Best Actor	Assembly	Won	
2008	29th Hundred Flowers Awards	Best Actor	Assembly	Won	
2009	27th Golden Rooster Awards	Best Actor	Assembly	Nominated	
2009	13th Huabiao Awards	Outstanding Actor	Assembly	Won	
2009	2nd Huading Awards	Best Actor	Assembly	Won	
2009	12th Golden Phoenix Awards	Society Award	Assembly	Won	
2009	46th Golden Horse Film Festival and Awards	Best Supporting Actor	The Equation of Love and Death	Nominated	
2010	1st New York Chinese Film Festival	Best Actor	The Message	Won	
2015	7th Macau International Movie Festival	Best Supporting Actor	Mr. Six	Nominated	
2015	3rd China International Film Festival London	Best Actor	The Taking of Tiger Mountain	Won	
2015	30th Golden Rooster Awards	Best Actor	The Taking of Tiger Mountain	Won	
2016	16th Huabiao Awards	Outstanding Actor	The Taking of Tiger Mountain	Nominated	
2016	12th Chinese American Film Festival	Best Actor	Operation Mekong	Won	
2017	24th Beijing College Student Film Festival	Best Actor	Operation Mekong	Nominated	
2017	24th Beijing College Student Film Festival	Most Popular Actor	Operation Mekong	Won	
2017	8th China Film Director's Guild Awards	Best Actor	Operation Mekong	Nominated	
2017	12th Chinese American Film Festival	Best Actor	Operation Mekong	Won	
2017	5th China Britain Film Festival	Best Actor	Operation Mekong	Won	
2018	34th Hundred Flowers Awards	Best Actor	Operation Mekong	Nominated	
2018	34th Hundred Flowers Awards	Best Supporting Actor	Operation Red Sea	Nominated	
2019	32nd Tokyo International Film Festival; Gold Crane Awards	Best Actor	The Captain	Won	
2019	11th Macau International Movie Festival	Best Actor	The Captain	Won	
2020	35th Hundred Flowers Awards	Best Actor	The Captain	Nominated	
2020	18th Huabiao Awards	Outstanding Actor	The Captain	Nominated	

Awards and achievements
Golden Horse Award
Preceded by Tony Leung Chiu-Wai for Lust, Caution	Best Actor; 2008 for Assembly	Succeeded by Huang Bo, Nick Cheung for Cow, Beast Stalker
