= Lishimen Reservoir =

- Hanshan Lake
- 里石门水库 (Chinese)
- Location of Lishimen Reservoir in Zhejiang province
- Location: Jietou, Tiantai County, Zhejiang
- Coordinates: 29°03′54″N 120°46′03″E
- Type: Reservoir
- Primary inflows: Shifeng River
- Primary outflows: Shifeng River
- Basin countries: China
- Built: May 1973
- First flooded: November 1979
- Water volume: 199,000,000 m^{3} (0.048 cu mi)

Lishimen Reservoir (simplified Chinese: 里石门水库; traditional Chinese: 裡石門水庫; pinyin: Lǐshímén Shuǐkù) is a reservoir in the town of Jietou, in Tiantai County, Zhejiang, China. It also known as "Hanshan Lake" due to the Tang dynasty poet-monk Hanshan lived here in seclusion for a long time.

== History ==
Construction of Lishimen Reservoir, designed by Zhejiang Hydropower Design Institute, commenced in May 1973 and was completed in November 1979. The total investment of the project was 27.54 million yuan.

It covers a total catchment area of 296 km^{2} (114 sq mi) and has a storage capacity of some 199,000,000 m^{3} (0.048 cu mi) of water.

== Dam ==
The dam is 70 m (230 ft) high, 4 m (13 ft) thick, and its bottom is 15.5 m (51 ft) width with 120,000 m^{3} (2.9×10^{−5} cu mi) of concrete was poured.

== Culture ==
The reservoir served as a shooting location for the 2021 war film The Battle at Lake Changjin.
