= The Taking of Tiger Mountain =

2014 Chinese-Hong Kong film by Tsui Hark

- Theatrical release poster
- Directed by: Tsui Hark
- Screenplay by: Huang Xin; Li Yang; Tsui Hark; Wu Bing; Dong Zhe; Lin Chi-an
- Based on: Tracks in the Snowy Forest by Qu Bo
- Produced by: Huang Jianxin; Nansun Shi; Yu Dong
- Starring: Zhang Hanyu; Tony Leung Ka-fai; Lin Gengxin; Yu Nan; Tong Liya
- Cinematography: Choi Sung-fai
- Edited by: Yu Baiyang
- Music by: Wu Wai-lap
- Production companies: Bona Film Group; Huaxia Film Distribution; August First Film Studio; Wanda Media; China Movie Channel; Youku Tudou Film; Shanghai Real Thing Media; Dream Sky Film; Bona Entertainment; Heyi Pictures
- Distributed by: Tianjin Bona Cultural Media; Huaxin Film Distribution; Wuzhou Film Distribution; Beijing Sankuai Online Technology; Distribution Workshop
- Release dates: December 23, 2014 (China); May 14, 2015 (Hong Kong)
- Running time: 141 minutes
- Countries: China; Hong Kong
- Language: Mandarin
- Box office: US$255.7 million (China)

The Taking of Tiger Mountain (Chinese: 智取威虎山) is a 2014 epic action adventure film directed by Tsui Hark, produced by Huang Jianxin and Yu Dong, and based on the novel Tracks in the Snowy Forest by Qu Bo. A Chinese-Hong Kong co-production, the story is based on the revolutionary opera of the same name about a conflict between the People's Liberation Army of China and a bandit gang. It was released on December 23, 2014.

Zhang Hanyu portrays Yang Zirong and Lin Gengxin takes on the role of Shao Jianbo, the two protagonists of the story. While Yang Zirong (1917–1947) is based on the real-life person, the other hero of the story Shao Jianbo is fictional, and Qu Bo created the character based on himself, as the story is seen through the point of view of Shao Jianbo.

Bona Film Group bought the rights to the novel in 2009 and had been planning the adaptation since.

Qu Bo's novel was also famously adapted into the opera Taking Tiger Mountain by Strategy, from which the film takes its title.

== Plot ==
After the Japanese surrender following World War II, the People's Liberation Army must retake areas overrun by bandits who have raided the Japanese arsenals. Shao Jianbo, known by his codename Captain 203 after his unit, commands a group of 30 men. They are out of food and low on ammunition. One of their problems is resolved when they defeat a group of bandits dressed as the PLA who are guarding stores of ammunition. Reinforcements arrive via train in the form of Yang Zirong and Bai Ru, a combat medic, who are warmly greeted when they bring food. Captain 203 leads his men to the village raided by the bandits. Along the way, they meet a young boy who lost his family to bandit attacks. Though he initially distrusts the PLA soldiers, he warms to them after they rescue him from a bandit spy in the village.

The villagers request that the soldiers stay and defeat the warlord Hawk, as they know he will return to raiding their village once the soldiers have left. From questioning the bandit spy, Captain 203 learns that Hawk seeks a map the spy was planning to give him. Zirong suggests that since the soldiers are vastly outnumbered and outgunned by the bandits, who are holed up in a fortress on Tiger Mountain, Captain 203 send him as a spy to infiltrate them, as he has previously infiltrated other local bandit groups. Captain 203 initially refuses but relents when Zirong resigns in protest. Zirong takes the bandit spy's map and sets up a location to exchange secret messages with the soldiers.

Though the bandits are suspicious, they accept Zirong after he passes a series of tests. During one, Hawk sends Ma Qinglian, a woman he has kidnapped from the local village and made his unwilling wife, to tempt Zirong. Zirong recognizes her as the village boy's mother and, without revealing his true identity, indicates to her that her son is safe. Qinglian insists they escape immediately and return to the village, but Zirong refuses. When the bandits cut down the trees used to mark the spot where he leaves his intelligence reports, Zirong improvises by marking new spots.

When Qinglian again insists that they escape the fortress, Brother 2 overhears her and informs Hawk. Zirong surreptitiously drops incriminating evidence in Brother 2's pocket and instructs Qinglian to accuse Brother 2 of treachery. Convinced that Zirong and Qinglian are telling the truth, Hawk executes Brother 2. Hawk organizes a raid on the village and sends 300 men. The soldiers, warned by Zirong, set traps and use improvised artillery to rout the much larger force, though several soldiers die. The bandit spy who they had previously caught escapes to the fortress, where he and Zirong accuse each other of being spies. Hawk, unable to believe his forces were defeated by a small unit, sides with Zirong, who says the village was guarded by a much larger company. Hawk has Zirong execute the bandit spy.

During Hawk's birthday celebration, Zirong sends plans for an attack, and Captain 203 mobilizes his troops. Qinglian's son guides them to a weak point in the fortress identified by Zirong, and Zirong helps from the inside. As the soldiers overpower the remaining bandits, Hawk grabs Qinglian and flees. Zirong chases, and, in the resulting gunfight, kills Hawk, reuniting Qinglian and her son. In the modern day, a descendant of Qinglian visits her and honors the memory of Zirong and the other soldiers, including a fantasy sequence where Zirong engages in a second, higher-stakes battle with Hawk that involves an out-of-control airplane hidden inside the fortress.

== Cast ==
- Zhang Hanyu as Yang Zirong
- Tony Leung Ka-fai as Hawk
- Lin Gengxin as Shao Jianbo (Captain 203)
- Yu Nan as Ma Qinglian
- Tong Liya as Bai Ru (Little Dove)
- Han Geng as Jimmy
- Chen Xiao as Gao Bo
- Mo Tse as Ma Baojun
- Zha Ka (aka Han Feixing) as Tank
- Zhang Li as Big Brother
- Su Yiming as Zi Shuan
- Shi Yanneng as Bro 2
- Sun Jiaolong as Bro 3
- Cheng Sihan as Bro 4
- Yuan Wu as Bro 5
- Xiao Yi as Bro 6
- Wang Yao as Bro 7
- Yang Yiwei as Bro 8
- Lv Zhong as Grandmother

== Reception ==
=== Box office ===
The film topped the Chinese box office during its opening week earning US$51.9 million in six days. In its second week the film remained at the summit earning an additional US$58.3 million despite facing competition with Night at the Museum: Secret of the Tomb. As of March 2015, the film has grossed over $150 million in China making it Bona's highest-grossing film.

=== Critical response ===
Film Business Asia's Derek Elley gave the film an 8 out of 10, calling it "bracingly effective popcorn action."
