= The Battle at Lake Changjin II =

2022 Chinese-Hong Kong film by Chen Kaige

- Theatrical release poster

Chinese name
- Traditional Chinese: 長津湖之水門橋
- Simplified Chinese: 长津湖之水门桥
- Literal meaning: The Water Gate Bridge at Lake Changjin
Transcriptions
Standard Mandarin
- Hanyu Pinyin: Chángjīn Hú zhī Shuǐmén Qiáo
- Directed by: Chen Kaige; Tsui Hark; Dante Lam
- Screenplay by: Lan Xiaolong; Huang Jianxin
- Produced by: Candy Leung; Chen Hong; Chen Kaige; Tsui Hark; Dante Lam; Jiang Defu; Nansun Shi
- Starring: Wu Jing; Jackson Yee; Duan Yihong; Zhang Hanyu
- Cinematography: Luo Pan (罗攀); Gao Hu (高虎); Kenny Tse; Peter Pau; Huang Yongheng (黄永恒); Ding Yu (丁豫)
- Edited by: Mai Zishan (麦子善); Li Dianshi (李点石); He Yongyi (何永祎)
- Music by: Zhiyi Wang; Elliot Leung; Li Ye
- Production companies: Beijing Bona Film Group Co., Ltd. August First Film Studio; Huaxia Film Distribution; China Film Co., Ltd. Shanghai Film Group; Alibaba Pictures; Dengfeng International Culture Media; Emperor Motion Pictures
- Distributed by: Bona Film Group; Emperor Motion Pictures
- Release date: 1 February 2022
- Running time: 149 minutes
- Countries: China; Hong Kong
- Languages: Mandarin; English
- Box office: $626.6 million

The Battle at Lake Changjin II, also released as The Battle at Water Gate Bridge, is a 2022 war drama film co-produced and co-directed by Chen Kaige, Tsui Hark and Dante Lam, written by Lan Xiaolong and Huang Jianxin, and starring Wu Jing and Jackson Yee. It was produced by the Bona Film Group in light of the 100th anniversary of the Chinese Communist Party. The film is the sequel to The Battle at Lake Changjin (2021). It is a fictionalized retelling of the fighting at Funchilin Pass during the Battle of Chosin Reservoir against American forces in the Korean War.

The film was released on 1 February 2022 (Chinese New Year) and grossed over $626 million in China, making it the ninth-highest-grossing film of 2022.

== Plot ==
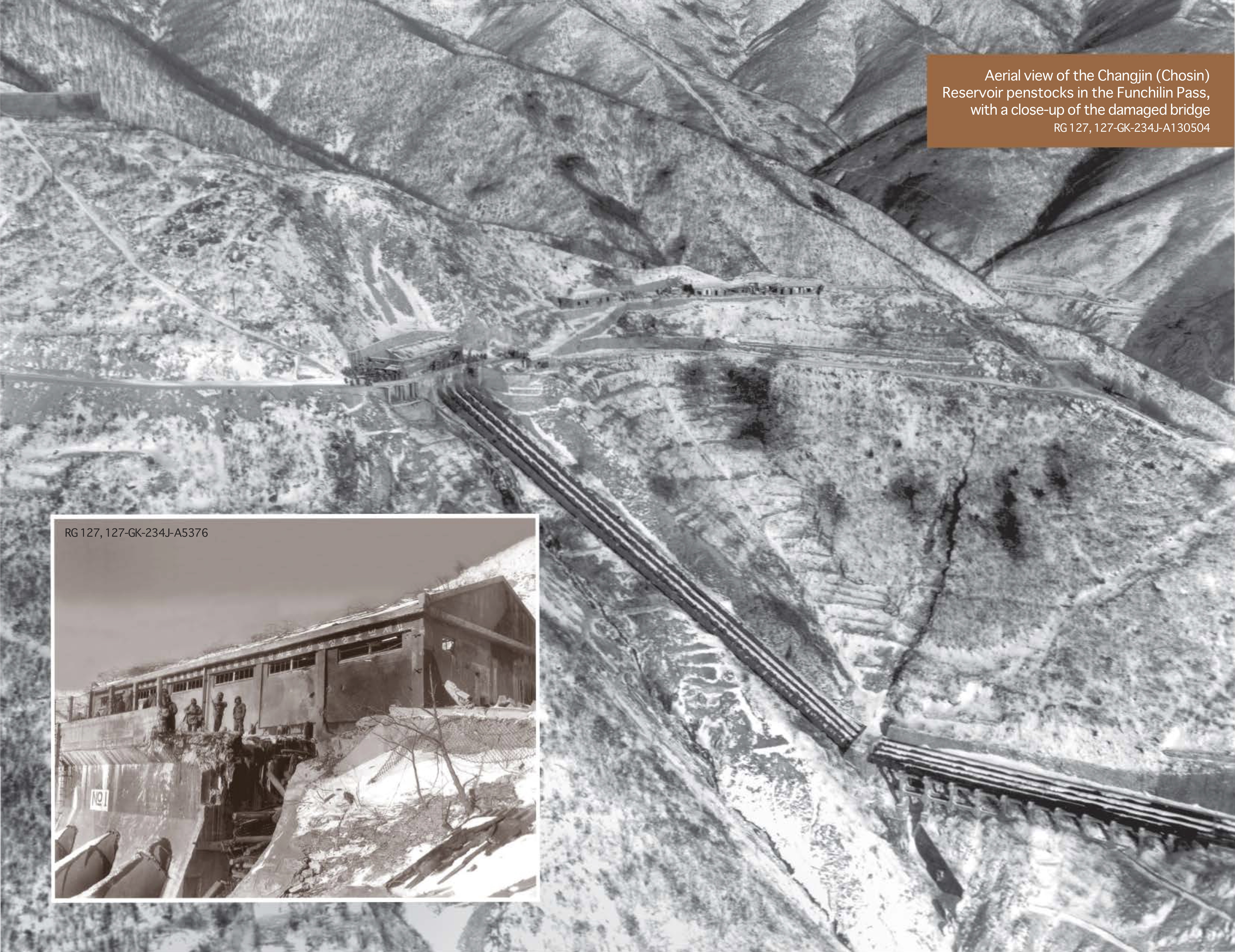
Historical photo of the Funchilin Pass, with a close-up of the blown bridge

After fighting at Sinhung-ni, the Chinese People's Volunteer Army 7th Company arrives at a location 12km from Hagaru-ri where it meets elements of the 20th Corps and the artillery battalion commanded by Commander Yang, preparing to attack the airfield and American 1st Marine Division supply base at Hagaru-ri. The PVA units drive captured American vehicles and use captured equipment.

In the Sea of Japan Douglas A-1 Skyraiders launch from U.S. aircraft carriers to attack PVA units advancing on Hagaru-ri from nine directions. The 7th Company is then strafed by United States Navy Vought F4U Corsairs, but they move on to a different target inflicting no casualties. 7th Company commander Wu Qianli realises the planes intend to attack the artillery battalion and moves his men forward. The scene then shifts to the artillery battalion column advancing in captured U.S. trucks towing artillery pieces which is then attacked by the Corsairs inflicting "maximum damage" on the column, destroying all the guns. The 7th Company arrives on the scene, Yang tells Qianli that all his captured guns have been destroyed, Qianli hands Yang a pistol and tells the 7th Company to go capture more guns 1.5km away. Yang then rallies his men to also go capture more guns.

PVA soldiers thrown themselves onto a barbed wire fence so that their comrades can run over their backs to attack U.S. positions. PVA forces, including the 7th Company and the artillery battalion overrun the U.S. defenders, killing many of them. Ping He uses a bazooka to destroy a U.S. machine gun position. The artillery battalion then turns the captured artillery around to begin shelling the Hagaru-ri airfield. Qianli reclaims his pistol from Yang and moves his unit forward to attack the airfield.

The PVA attacks Hagaru-ri. 1st Marine Division commander Major general Oliver P. Smith is informed that that PVA are everywhere and coming in fast. The artillery battalion fires a creeping barrage ahead of the 7th Company. The Americans evacuate their hospital while Smith demands that the runway is kept open and he is put in contact with Tokyo. The scene then shifts to Tokyo where General Douglas MacArthur is attending a celebration. MacArthur receives a phone call from Smith who advises him that Hagaru-ri airfield is the rear line, that he lacks troops to hold the line and requests reinforcements to cover their withdrawal. MacArthur shouts and orders Smith to stop his retreat. Where PVA artillery is now hitting the airfield and the rest of the base. A C-47 Skytrain is destroyed by artillery fire and Smith orders aircraft to use the road instead. Smith orders reinforcement of the Water Gate Bridge and then orders a retreat from Hagaru-ri. Yang is wounded by U.S. artillery fire mangling his hand but alone manages to load and fire an artillery piece destroying an American gun. The Americans retreat under artillery fire as the PVA infantry overrun Hagaru-ri.

In PVA 9th Corps headquarters at Chengfang-dong. Song Shilun is informed that the Marines are retreating and that the only route is across the Water Gate Bridge. Peng orders the 7th Company to disengage from the fighting at Hagaru-ri to block the U.S. retreat at Water Gate Bridge. At Hagaru-ri the 7th Company is mopping up. Wu Wanli who was injured in the attack gives his blanket to a badly wounded American in the hospital. The PVA troops rest and recuperate while the commanders meet and count their casualties, Qianli receives the identity tags of the 78 men who have been killed and then leaves a lit cigarette as an offering in the snow.

Qianli receives the order to advance to the Water Gate Bridge and destroy it. Qianli's radio operator points out a destroyed U.S. helicopter and says that in the future China will have their own better planes and Qianli responds that it is just a matter of time. Qianli orders the 7th Company to get ready to move out.

When President Harry S. Truman receives a telegram from MacArthur requesting use of atomic bombs to win the war. A voiceover from a 30 November press conference has Truman avoiding saying whether or not atomic bombs would be used.

The 7th Company advances towards the Water Gate Bridge in blizzard conditions that freeze their compass. The 7th Company arrives at the bridge to find the 9th Company attacking the U.S. forces and they join the attack, rescuing the 9th Company survivors but ultimately being forced to withdraw. U.S. bombers attack the area with minimal effect while U.S. forces repair the bridge and their defensive positions. The 7th and 9th Companies plan a new attack, the 9th Company commander says that they must destroy the bridge before dying from an earlier wound.

U.S. forces at the bridge inventory their weapons while armored reinforcements proceed toward the bridge. The U.S. commander, a Captain plans to draw the PVA onto the south end of the bridge and then destroy them. Qianli briefs both companies on the plan to attack the bridge from four different directions. Qianli tells Wanli to run free showing that he has earned his trust. The companies salute the sun looking north towards China and recite "Long live the People's Republic of China" before splitting up for the attack.

The four groups deploy unseen in the dark. A U.S. sniper shoots a PVA messenger and in turn is shot by a PVA sniper who also shoots out a searchlight on the north end of the bridge. Wanli throws a grenade which blows up the U.S. communications bunker starting the attack. A U.S. watchtower on the south end of the bridge is destroyed by a bazooka shot. The U.S. defenders go on full alert, but still plan to trap the PVA attackers. PVA forces blow a hole in a water pipe below the bridge and then fire a bazooka up the pipe causing an explosion at the pump house behind the bridge. Three PVA soldiers run up the pipe and take over the pump house, setting off explosions that kill U.S. soldiers who arrive to investigate. More PVA soldiers run up inside the pipe and more U.S soldiers enter the pump house, one of the U.S. soldiers throws a grenade down the pipe and a PVA soldier jumps on it and absorbs the blast. Another bazooka round is fired up the pipe killing more U.S. soldiers. A PVA soldier shoots out the lights in the pump house and more Americans are killed then more PVA soldiers emerge from the pipe. North of the bridge Qianli launches a solo attack, when the Americans try to shoot him with a recoilless rifle they hit their headquarters bunker. The Americans leave the HQ bunker after setting a demolition charges, Qianli stops more than ten unarmed U.S. troops, the demolition charge detonates and the Americans scatter while Qianli searches the bunker to try to capture the U.S. commander. PVA and U.S. soldiers fight for control of the pump house while PVA mortars destroy the U.S. ammunition storage areas. PVA forces overrun the U.S. positions on the north end of the bridge, while on the south end they spring their trap on the PVA attackers. Wanli blows up a machine gun position with a grenade, Yu Congrong pushes him out of the way of a sniper who shoots Yu, apparently killing him. The U.S. armored column approaches the north end of the bridge and a tank fires on the PVA who respond with mortar fire and an uphill infantry attack. Wanli, having moved through the U.S. trenches, tries to grenade a U.S. position but is stopped by the U.S. commander, they wrestle and the captain prevails until Qianli arrives and puts a gun to the captain's head, Wanli then puts the primed grenade inside the captain's jacket and it explodes killing him. The U.S. defenders at the north end of the bridge fire on the PVA with flamethrowers, killing several soldiers one of whom keeps firing until he burns to death. The PVA use mortars as bazookas and shoot a gas can causing petrol to spread on the ground, when the flamethrowers fire again they ignite the petrol killing many U.S. soldiers. The PVA soldiers in the pump house kill American soldiers on the roof. Wanli and Qianli rescue Yu who was concussed. A U.S. tanks advances across the bridge, the PVA troops at the south end try to destroy it with a captured recoilless rifle. Qianli launches a solo attack on the U.S. troops on and around the pump house, tackling a U.S. soldier on the roof and then falling inside. A PVA soldier runs from the pump house towards the tank carrying a satchel charge, he is repeatedly shot and the charge explodes disintegrating him. Inside the pump house Ping He is attacked by a U.S. soldier who impales him on a metal beam; Qianli then garrotes the American but is entangled in wreckage. Ping He takes another satchel charge and dives underneath the tank, his arm is crushed and he is dragged under the tank, he tells Qianli to fire and he does so igniting the satchel charge, destroying the tank and blowing a hole in the bridge. The PVA units advance on the bridge destroying the final U.S. positions, while Qianli is trapped in the pump house wreckage. Renewed tank fire disintegrates a PVA soldier as the vanguard of the 1st Marine Division approaches the north end of the bridge and then proceed to bombard the area. Qianli uses a signal whistle to order a retreat and the PVA withdraw. Wanli tries to rescue Qianli who tells him to leave, but he and another soldier extract Qianli and they escape down the pipe.

The next morning some surviving 7th and 9th Company soldiers sleep in a valley near the bridge. Yu climbs a hill for a better radio signal when a flight of F4U Corsairs approaches the valley. The Corsairs drops napalm which falls short as Yu has fired on the planes drawing their attention to him, the planes follow Yu dropping more napalm and he is set alight and disintegrates in the fire. The planes return and strafe the valley pulverising several PVA soldiers and wounding many others, including Wanli. At the bridge the Marines repair the bridge and their fighting positions as they prepare to hold the bridge for three days to allow their forces to retreat across it. Below the bridge more PVA survivors strip the destroyed U.S. tank for supplies. The scene then ships to the Sea of Japan where a voiceover says that the 1st Marine Division is facing a major test. The scene then shifts to MacArthur in Tokyo who is informed of the damage to the Water Gate Bridge, MacArthur says that he told Smith not to retreat, he is told that his atomic bomb plan caused controversy in the UN and he orders the Water Gate Bridge be repaired.

The PVA then put a captured U.S. M3 half-track back into service, while in a voiceover Qianli pledges to attack the bridge no matter how many times the U.S. repairs it. The wounded Mei Sheng is seen in a flashback with his wife where she tells him to come back alive. Qianli gives his commander's whistle to Wanli. Night falls and the U.S. forces at the bridge scan the area. In a voiceover Qianli orders Wanli to blow the whistle every three hours from either end of the bridge to distract the defenders. Qianli wraps himself in a parachute and approaches the bridge from the north. Meanwhile the U.S. commander orders that music is played over the bridge loudspeakers causing the defenders to relax. The 9th Company then attacks the bridge while above the bridge Mei sets the cargo in the half-track alight and drives it down towards the bridge as Qianli slides down the hill. Wanli tries to enter the pipe but finds it barricaded with barbed wire. The U.S. defenders fire on the half-track killing Mei but it explodes on the bridge. Qianli slides over U.S. positions and lands on the pump house roof, he slides off the roof and onto the bridge where he is surrounded by many U.S. soldiers who take no action because it would be "more exciting." Qianli tries to shoot an artillery shell he was carrying, but his pistol misfires, the Americans open fire, Qianli is hit numerous times and falls off the bridge but manages to shoot the shell's fuse causing a massive explosion that blows a hole in the bridge. Wanli recovers Qianli who dies in front of him. Wanli recalls Qianli's instruction to him to run free.

At dawn Wanli is frozen to Qianli's body. The Americans patrol the area around the bridge, seeing Qianli's head they fire a flamethrower and his body is consumed in flames causing his body and Wanli to slide down the hill. The flamethrower operator reports that there are no more PVA below the bridge and the U.S. commander says its time to go home. Wanli regains consciousness from the heat of Qianli's burning body. Wanli looks up to see U.S. helicopters flying in bridge spans while a voiceover narrates how U.S. aircraft flew in spans to repair the bridge. The U.S. troops lay the bridge spans and vehicles begin crossing over the bridge. Smith crosses the bridge in a jeep and sees a red scarf in a tree which he takes as a sign that the U.S. doesn't have much time to pull out.

When evacuation of Hungnam on 24 December where U.S. forces described as the "10th Army" prepare to destroy rail lines and supplies that cannot be evacuated. A U.S. soldier is shown putting a bottle of whisky into the body bag of a dead soldier. Captions state: "The Battle of the Water Gate Bridge was a typical penetrating attack into the depths of the U.S. defense. It had significant importance in cutting off the enemy's retreat, crashing the enemy's morale, and accelerating the course of the battle. This battle demonstrated our army's indomitable spirit in battle and the powerful will of Chinese people to defend Chinese nation's dignity!" Smith is shown paying his respects at a huge graveyard overlooking Hungnam.

The PVA are shown quick marching past the bridge towards Hungnam, Wanli fires his carbine to draw their attention and is recognised as being from the 7th Company. At Hungnam demolition charges explode across the city as glum and wounded American troops look on from ships as they sail away. The PVA, including Wanli, are shown triumphantly running into the ruins of Hungnam on 25 December, reaching the beach where they wave red flags and cheer. Four jeeps containing PVA officers stop on a mountaintop. Song looks out over Lake Changjin, removes his cap and bows while other officers salute. Wanli takes a handful of dirt and wraps it in fabric. In a rear area PVA company commanders report their losses, among the artillery battalion only 107 out of 221 report for duty, while Wanli reports that of the 157 soldiers in the 7th Company only one reports for duty. Song stops and stares solemnly at Wanli and orders that a flag be brought. Song asks Wanli if he wishes for anything, Wanli replies that he wants to restore the 7th Company. Song presents Wanli with a flag and salutes him. The flag is then shown flying as Wanli holds an urn containing Qianli's ashes. Wanli imagines Qianli asking him about skipping stones across water, and afterwards returns to his family village.

== Cast ==
| Performer | Role | Description | Notes |
|---|---|---|---|
| Wu Jing | Wu Qianli | commander of the 7th Company | based on Li Changyan (李昌言) |
| Jackson Yee | Wu Wanli | artillery platoon soldier of the 7th Company, younger brother of Wu Qianli | |
| Duan Yihong | Tan Ziwei | commander of the 3rd Battalion | |
| Zhu Yawen | Mei Sheng | political commissar of the 7th Company | Based on Zhuang Yuandong (庄元东) |
| Li Chen | Yu Congrong | leader of the Fire Platoon of the 7th Company | |
| Elvis Han | Ping He | sniper in the 7th Company | |
| Zhang Hanyu | Song Shilun | deputy commander of the People's Volunteer Army and commander and political commissar of the PVA 9th Army | |
| Geng Le | Battalion Commander Yang | | |
| Du Chun | | | |

== Production ==
The Battle at Lake Changjin II was filmed back-to-back with the preceding film The Battle at Lake Changjin in early 2021. According to Bona Film Group president and producer Yu Dong, the film would "complete the story of the 7th Company and make people see why they are called the 'steel 7th Company'". The production was led by the film office of the Publicity Department of the Chinese Communist Party. Most of the film was shot in early 2021 with two crews, who shot for a combined total of 210 days. Some scenes were reshot at Hengdian World Studios in late 2021.

The film uses extensive special effects, including millions of RMB worth of white sand that was transported to Hengdian for use as fake snow. Actors also wore special makeup to simulate frostbite on the characters' faces.

Actor Wu Jing said that the combat in this film was more difficult than in the preceding film.

== Release ==
On 13 January 2022, it was announced that the film would be released on 1 February (Chinese New Year) as a Chinese New Year film.

It was released in IMAX theaters and formed part of IMAX's second-highest-grossing Chinese New Year after 2021.

Yu Dong suggested in an interview that the production company might release a six-hour director's cut combining material from both The Battle at Lake Changjin and its sequel.

== Reception ==
=== Box office ===
By the end of 17 April 2022, the film had grossed CN¥4.214 billion (US$676 million) in the domestic Chinese market. It is the ninth-highest-grossing film of 2022.

The movie had a ¥641 million ($100.7 million) debut day, for the second-biggest Chinese New Year opening day ever, approximately 35% below the record set by Detective Chinatown 3. The film earned a 3 day total of $241 million and a 5 day total of $351 million, beating the original film in both respects. in the first week of the Chinese New Year holidays, the movie ended up grossing $398 million, with ¥981 million ($154 million) from its opening weekend. On its first two days in theaters, its average ticket price was between $9.00 and $10.00, lower than the average ticket price for rival films Snipers and Dunk for Future, possibly because The Battle at Lake Changjin II was more widely shown in lower-tier cities with lower ticket prices. Grosses began to drop after the first weekend, from ¥288 million ($45 million) on Sunday to ¥189 million ($29.7 million) on its first Monday.

=== Critical response ===
The film has been rated with a 7.2 out of 10 and a 9.6 out of 10 on Chinese aggregator sites Douban and Maoyan respectively, compared to 7.4 and 9.5 for its predecessor.

Scott Mendelson of Forbes called the film a "'just action' flick" and said it was patriotic but "not quite nationalistic or terribly jingoistic".

Rebecca Davis of Foreign Policy described the film as propaganda that "extol the virtues of sacrificing oneself for the Chinese Communist Party." She further described the film as "plodding, heavy-handed, and preachy", and that although the film "portrays U.S. Gen. Douglas MacArthur as a nuclear-war-hungry boor and spends most of its two-and-a-half-hour run time slaughtering Americans", its subject "is the suffering of Chinese troops, not pure anti-Americanism."

== Music ==
| No. | Title | Lyrics | Music | Singer | Length |
|---|---|---|---|---|---|
| 1. | "Lake Changjin (长津湖)" (Theme Song) | Zhang Heping | Feng Xiaoquan, Feng Tianyi | Huan Liu | 3:55 |
