= Zhiyi Wang (composer) =

Chinese composer

Zhiyi Wang 王之一
- Born: Suzhou, China
- Education: Oberlin College and Conservatory; University of Louisville
- Genres: Film score, contemporary classical music, popular music
- Occupation: Composer

Zhiyi Wang (Chinese: 王之一) is a Chinese composer whose work spans film and television scoring, concert music, and popular music. His film work includes The Battle at Lake Changjin (2021). Wang received Outstanding Film Music at the 19th Huabiao Film Award for the film in 2023. He was also a member of the music team for the opening ceremony of the 2008 Summer Olympics.

== Early life and education ==
Wang was born in Suzhou, China. He began studying piano at five and composition at twelve, and later studied composition at the affiliated middle school of the Shanghai Conservatory of Music. He earned a bachelor's degree in composition from Oberlin College and Conservatory and a master's degree in composition from the University of Louisville.

== Career ==
=== 2008 Beijing Olympics ===
In 2007, Wang joined the music team for the opening ceremony of the 2008 Beijing Olympics. He composed Fanfare for the Ceremony and orchestrated four other pieces, including You and Me, which was composed by Chen Qigang, and Dream of the Five Rings.

=== Film and television ===
Wang composed music for the films But Always and Highway of Love; the two scores brought him a nomination for Discovery of the Year at the 2015 World Soundtrack Awards. In 2019, he composed the theme music “祖国” (“Motherland”) for the anthology film My People, My Country, including the segment The Guiding Star directed by Chen Kaige. Wang was nominated for Outstanding Score – Short Film (Live Action) at the 2020 Hollywood Music in Media Awards for My People, My Country (《我和我的祖国》).

He composed for The Battle at Lake Changjin in 2021. Wang received a Best Music nomination at the 35th Golden Rooster Awards in 2022 for the film. Wang later received Outstanding Film Music at the 19th Huabiao Film Award for the score. His score for The Volunteers: To the War received the Most Popular Music Award at the 21st China Movie Channel Media Focus Unit in 2024 and was nominated for Best Music at the 37th Golden Rooster Awards. In 2026, Wang was nominated for Main Title – TV Show (Foreign Language) at the 17th Hollywood Music in Media Awards for the television series Wuyue Kingdom.

=== Concert music ===
Wang's concert works have been performed at the Sochi Winter International Arts Festival by violist Yuri Bashmet and the Moscow Soloists. His piano work Etude for Concert was performed at Carnegie Hall in 2022.

== Awards and nominations ==
Year	Award	Work	Result
2014	25th Golden Melody Awards – Best Arranger (最佳編曲人獎)	Li Jian – 〈抚仙湖〉; 〈绽放〉 (《拾光》)	Nominated
2015	World Soundtrack Awards – Discovery of the Year	But Always; Highway of Love	Nominated
2020	Hollywood Music in Media Awards – Outstanding Score – Short Film (Live Action)	My People, My Country (《我和我的祖国》)	Nominated
2022	35th Golden Rooster Awards – Best Music	The Battle at Lake Changjin	Nominated
2023	19th Huabiao Film Awards – Outstanding Film Music	The Battle at Lake Changjin	Won
2024	21st China Movie Channel Media Focus Unit – Most Popular Music Award	The Volunteers: To the War	Won
2024	37th Golden Rooster Awards – Best Music	The Volunteers: To the War	Nominated
2026	Hollywood Music in Media Awards – Main Title – TV Show (Foreign Language)	Wuyue Kingdom	Nominated
