= Meishan railway station =

Railway station in Huzhou, China

Meishan railway station 煤山站

General information
- Location: Meishan, Changxing County, Huzhou, Zhejiang; China
- Coordinates: 31°05′34″N 119°45′23″E
- Operated by: China Railway Shanghai Group
- Line: Changxing–Niutoushan railway

History
- Opened: 1960
Location

Meishan railway station (Chinese: 煤山站; pinyin: Méishān Zhàn) is a railway station located in Meishan town, Changxing County, Huzhou, Zhejiang, China, on the Changxing–Niutoushan railway, which are operated by China Railway Shanghai Group.

== History ==
Meishan railway station was built in 1960.

== Culture ==
The station has been used in a number of films and television series, including: Railway Guerrilla, Entering a New Era, and The Battle at Lake Changjin.
