= Yu Dong =

Chinese film producer, and presenter

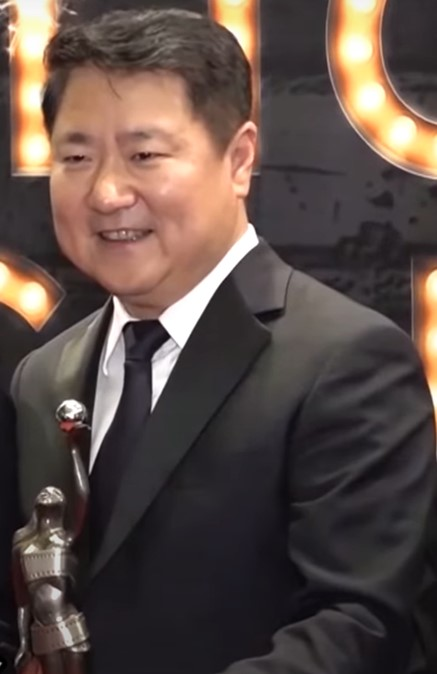
- Yu at a press conference with the crew of the film Project Gutenberg on 14 April 2019, after the 38th Hong Kong Film Awards.
- Born: January 8, 1971 (age 55); Beijing, China
- Other names: Don Yu
- Occupations: Businessman; film producer; presenter
- Years active: 1999-present
- Known for: Chairman of Bona Film Group

Yu Dong (Chinese: 于冬, born January 8, 1971), also known as Don Yu, is a Chinese filmmaker and businessman. He is chairman of Bona Film Group, which has produced films such as Our Time Will Come, Operation Red Sea, and The Battle at Lake Changjin.

== Career ==
Yu graduated from the Beijing Film Academy and began his career at Beijing Film Studio. He later worked at China Film Group Corporation, where he was responsible for domestic distribution, before founding Beijing Bona Culture Communication Co. in 1999. The same year, he established Bona Film Group, one of the first private companies granted a film distribution license by the China Film Bureau, and became a leading film producer and distributor in China.
