= Yang Gensi =

- 楊根思
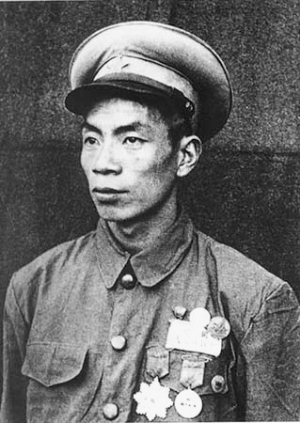
- Born: Yang Gengxi (Chinese: 羊庚璽); 26 November 1922; Taixing, Jiangsu, China
- Died: 29 November 1950 (aged 28); Hagaru-ri, Changjin County, North Korea
- Military career
- Allegiance: China
- Branch: People's Volunteer Army
- Service years: 1944 - 1950
- Conflicts: Korean War †

Yang Gensi (Chinese: 楊根思; 26 November 1922 – 29 November 1950) was a military hero of the People's Republic of China, remembered for his efforts and death in the Korean War. A frequent topic of Communist Chinese propaganda, the people of the republic were taught to emulate his acts in their daily lives.

Gensi was born in a poor peasant family in Taixing, Jiangsu Province. According to the stories about him, his family was killed by "landlords and capitalists" and he swore revenge and to overthrow the regime. He joined the New Fourth Army in 1944 and joined the Communist Party in 1945. In October 1950, his unit entered the Korean War as part of the People's Volunteer Army to support the communist North Korea against the United States-backed South Korea. In November of the same year, Yang Gensi was killed when protecting a strategic position. According to the official story, after withstanding eight waves of attacks, only he and two injured soldiers remained alive in the fortification, and they were out of ammunition. He threw himself into a group of more than 40 American soldiers while holding a satchel charge, sacrificing his life and killing the American soldiers.

In 1952, the Chinese authorities gave him the honorary title of "super hero". The Yang Gensi Memorial Park was established in 1955.
