= Operation Mekong =

2016 Chinese-Hong Kong film by Dante Lam

- Poster

Chinese name
- Traditional Chinese: 湄公河行動
- Simplified Chinese: 湄公河行动
- Literal meaning: Mekong River Action
Transcriptions
Standard Mandarin
- Hanyu Pinyin: Méigōng Hé Xíngdòng
Yue: Cantonese
- Jyutping: mei4 gung1 ho4 hang4 dung6
- Directed by: Dante Lam
- Screenplay by: Dante Lam; Chu Kang-ki; Lau Siu-kwan; Tam Wai-ching; Eric Lin
- Produced by: Candy Leung; Huang Jianxin
- Starring: Zhang Hanyu; Eddie Peng
- Cinematography: Edmond Fung
- Edited by: David Richardson
- Music by: Henry Lai; Julian Chan; Lam Kwan-fai
- Production companies: Bona Film Group; Distribution Workshop; Film Fireworks Production
- Distributed by: Bona Film Group
- Release date: 30 September 2016
- Running time: 124 minutes
- Countries: China; Hong Kong
- Languages: Mandarin; Thai; Lao; Burmese; English
- Box office: $173 million

Operation Mekong (Chinese: 湄公河行动) is a 2016 crime action film directed by Dante Lam and starring Zhang Hanyu and Eddie Peng. A Chinese-Hong Kong co-production, the film is based on the 2011 Mekong River massacre. It was released in China on 30 September 2016 and became one of the highest-grossing films in China.

== Plot ==
In the Golden Triangle region of the Mekong River, there is a section known as the "Gate of Hell." Two Chinese merchant ships were attacked by unidentified assailants while passing through this area. The Thai military later held a press conference, accusing the merchant ships of being involved in drug trafficking. Although it was claimed that all crew members had escaped, the bodies of 13 Chinese crew members were soon discovered, all brutally murdered. This shocking incident garnered significant attention from Chinese police. Gao Gang (played by Zhang Hanyu), the captain of the Anti-Narcotics Unit of the Yunnan Provincial Public Security Department, was assigned to lead a task force to Thailand. There, he teamed up with intelligence officer Fang Xinwu (played by Eddie Peng) to investigate. According to intelligence, the case was orchestrated by the notorious Golden Triangle drug lord, Naw Khar. Greedy and ruthless, Naw Khar posed a major threat to the safety of transportation in the Mekong River region. To bring him to justice, China, Laos, Myanmar, and Thailand launched joint patrols. While focusing efforts on dismantling Naw Khar's drug production bases, Gao Gang and his team ventured into dangerous territory, engaging in a fierce battle against the inhuman drug traffickers...

The film is based on the real-life Mekong River massacre.

== Cast ==
- Zhang Hanyu as Gao Gang
- Eddie Peng as Fang Xinwu
- Feng Wenjuan as Guo Bing "Aphrodite"
- Sun Chun as Yu Ping
- Chen Baoguo as Minister of Public Security Jiang Haifeng
- Liu Xianda as Xie Wenfeng "Icarus" (哪吒 meaning Nezha)
- Jonathan Wu Linkai as Kuai Yitong "Hermes"
- Zhao Jian as Guo Xu "Poseidon"
- Zhan Liguo as Fu Baowei "Panoptes" (二郎 meaning Erlangshen)
- Shi Zhanjie as Jiang Xing "Ares" (木星 meaning Jupiter)
- Wu Xudong as Wild Bull Team Leader
- Carl Ng as Pierre
- Pawalit Mongkolpisit as Naw Khar
- Vithaya Pansringarm as P'Som
- Ken Lo as Xing Deng
- Ron Weaver as Puja
- Ganesh Acharya as Mr. Zar
- Mandy Wei as Fang Xinwu's Girlfriend (cameo)

The members of the operation have aliases: in the Chinese version they are named after deities in Chinese folk religion, while in the English versions the names are changed to deities in Greek mythology.

== Production ==
Principal photography began on 13 September 2015, and wrapped on 31 January 2016. Shooting locations include China (Beijing and Yunnan), Myanmar, and Thailand (Bangkok), but a few scene include HQ task force and another place in Penang, Cameron Highlands Pahang and Perak.

Music composition included Henry Lai Wan-man. Andrew Simpson (animal trainer) worked as animal coordinator.

== Release ==
Operation Mekong was released on 30 September 2016. It concerns an incident that occurred in Chiang Saen District of Chiang Rai Province on 5 October 2011 when 13 Chinese crew members from two cargo ships were murdered by a Myanmar drug-trafficking ring.

Thai Prime Minister Prayut Chan-o-cha, responding to news of the film's imminent release, said that the film would be banned in Thailand if it was found to "damage" the country. "I have ordered authorities to check the content of Operation Mekong. If it is damaging, it will be banned," Gen Prayut said. Some believe that the reason for his government's nervousness is that Thai troops, the "elite" anti-drug Pa Muang Task Force, were known to have been at the scene of the massacre. Nine soldiers were arrested, but "...have since disappeared from the justice system." Naw Kham, a Golden Triangle drug kingpin, and his gang were found guilty of attacking the two Chinese cargo ships in collusion with Thai soldiers. He was executed in March 2013 in China along with three accomplices, including a Thai national.

== Reception ==
The film has grossed CN¥1.17 billion at the Chinese box office.

Jessica Kiang of Variety stated that Operation Mekong "hurtles by in an enjoyably giddy, propulsive rush right until the final titles, which dedicate the film to the dead fishermen and detail the fate of the real Naw Kham." She additionally stated that the "skillful, high-octane escapism" in the film may have interfered with the references to real-life tragedies.

== Awards and nominations ==
=== Accolades ===
Award	Category	Nominee	Result	Ref.
34th Hundred Flowers Awards	Best Director	Dante Lam	Nominated	
34th Hundred Flowers Awards	Best Writing	Dante Lam, Zhu Jingqi, Liu Xiaoqun, Tan Huixian, Lin Mingjie	Nominated	
34th Hundred Flowers Awards	Best Actor	Zhang Hanyu	Nominated	
34th Hundred Flowers Awards	Best Supporting Actress	Feng Wenjuan	Nominated	
31st Golden Rooster Awards	Best Picture	Operation Mekong	Won	
31st Golden Rooster Awards	Best Art Director	Li Jianwei	Nominated	
12th Chinese American Film Festival	Golden Angel Award Film	Operation Mekong	Won	
12th Chinese American Film Festival	Best Actor	Zhang Hanyu	Won	
12th Chinese American Film Festival	Best Producer		Won	
13th Guangzhou Student Film Festival	Most Popular Film	Operation Mekong	Won	
24th Beijing College Student Film Festival	Best Actor	Zhang Hanyu	Nominated	
24th Beijing College Student Film Festival	Best Actor	Eddie Peng	Nominated	
24th Beijing College Student Film Festival	Best Visual Effects		Nominated	
24th Beijing College Student Film Festival	Favorite Film	Operation Mekong	Won	
24th Beijing College Student Film Festival	Favorite Actor	Zhang Hanyu	Won	
