= Operation Red Sea =

2018 Chinese action war film

- Theatrical release poster
- Traditional Chinese: 紅海行動
- Simplified Chinese: 红海行动
- Hanyu Pinyin: Hóng Hǎi Xíngdòng
- Directed by: Dante Lam
- Written by: Feng Ji; Dante Lam; Chen Zhuzhu; Eric Lin
- Produced by: Candy Leung
- Starring: Zhang Yi; Huang Jingyu; Hai Qing; Du Jiang; Jiang Luxia
- Cinematography: Edward Fung; Horace Wong
- Edited by: Choi Chi-hung; Lam Chi-hang
- Music by: Elliot Leung
- Production companies: Bona Film Group; Emperor Motion Pictures; Film Fireworks Production; Star Dream Studio Media
- Release date: 16 February 2018
- Running time: 139 minutes
- Countries: China; Hong Kong
- Languages: Mandarin; English; Arabic
- Budget: US$70 million
- Box office: US$579.2 million

Operation Red Sea (Chinese: 红海行动) is a 2018 action war film directed by Dante Lam and starring Zhang Yi, Huang Jingyu, Hai Qing, Du Jiang and Jiang Luxia. A Chinese-Hong Kong co-production, the film is loosely based on the evacuation of foreign nationals and almost 600 Chinese citizens from Yemen's southern port of Aden during late March in 2015 Yemeni Civil War. According to Chinaculture.org, the film is in similar style to that of Operation Mekong.

It serves as the highlight film presented to audiences as a gift for the 90th anniversary of the founding of the Chinese People's Liberation Army, as well as the party's 19th National Congress. This film is said to be "China's first modern naval film". The film has grossed USD579 million, and received critical acclaim from critics, making it currently the thirteenth-highest-grossing ever in China and highest grossing Chinese film in 2018. It was selected as the Hong Kong entry for the Best Foreign Language Film at the 91st Academy Awards, but it was not nominated. A sequel, Operation Leviathan, was released in 2025.

== Plot ==
While on duty and touring through the waters of the Red Sea, the Chinese Navy patrol fleet receives a distress call that Somali pirates are boarding a cargo ship called the Guangdong and endangering Chinese passengers and seamen on board. They immediately deploy the 8-person Jiaolong Assault Team of the Marine Corps as their forward unit to try to slow the progress of the pirates until the heavily armed naval vessels can arrive on the scene. Using the assistance of a forward helicopter and a sniper dispatched as part of the assault team, they make significant progress to neutralize the situation and manage to eliminate all the Somali pirates onboard while awaiting the main Chinese fleet on duty in the Red Sea. During the operations, the pirate leader attempts to escape, and though eventually he was captured, their primary sniper receives a crippling spinal injury from gunfire during the pursuit and must be replaced. The assault team is praised for their success once the main fleet arrives.

Later, when the civil war situation in the nation of Yewaire (loosely based on Yemen) on the Arabian Peninsula becomes unstable due to a military coup by General Sharaf (loosely based on Ali Abdullah Saleh), orders are given to evacuate local Chinese personnel and workers from the country. Given the unrest and threats from rebels and local terrorist groups, the Jiaolong Assault team is assigned the task of evacuating the Chinese citizens to safety aboard the main Chinese naval vessels in temporary harbor in the area. Meanwhile, a Chinese-French journalist working in the area receives news that the local terrorist organization, Zaka, are prepared to impede local cooperation with the Chinese by all military and terrorist means available. The Jiaolong squad manages to save the Chinese civilians caught in the warzone and the PAP gendarmerie forces guarding the ambassador just in a nick of time while also saving an Arabic man forced to participate as a car bomber.

The terrorists are also uncovered to have plans to weaponize yellowcake materials into a dirty bomb. The eight-person forward assault team is given very poor support by the local government which is in turmoil. They must also relocate the Yewaire civilians working there to a safe deployment area 75 miles away using only a jeep convoy for transportation.

The convoy is ambushed by terrorists, and takes significant losses from a trained sniper named Taha and mortar attacks. All the Yewaire civilians and local government troops are killed, except the journalist. Zaka uses a kidnapped Chinese citizen as a bargaining chip so that the Chinese navy will release the Yewairian President, and beheads another hostage, who turned to be Abu, Xia Nan's assistant, as an example. Jiaolong and the journalist track down the hostage (first priority of the mission) to a terrorist stronghold with 150 militants, the local leader Sayyid, and armed with mechanized artillery and tanks. The assault team moves in with a risky plan involving covertly swapping the Chinese hostage and the journalist. Although the initial plan goes well at first, the plan backfires when the jeep the team uses gets a flat tire attracting attention, with no other choice the Jiaolong commandos are forced to reveal themselves and fight off hordes of terrorists in the compound. Eventually the Jiaolong commandos are separated with 1 team escaping in a jeep, another in a tank and another attempting to escape through another exit. The enemy sniper Taha from earlier reappears; the replacement Jiaolong sniper and his spotter are able to take him out. The operation eventually succeeds in evacuating all the hostages, but two Jiaolong members are killed in action during the chaos and another two are heavily injured.

The four remaining members later wingsuit into the yellowcake exchange site between the terrorists and the rebel group. Zaka backstabs the rebels, and in the chaos the Chinese operatives manage to corner Sayyid, who commits suicide. Jiaolong retrieves the dirty bomb recipe and captures the cargo plane carrying the yellowcake. Back on board the Chinese fleet, the fallen soldiers are honored for their courage under fire. Before the end credits, 5 Chinese naval vessels intercept 3 US Navy ships warning them they have entered Chinese waters and must leave immediately.

== Cast ==
- Zhang Yi as Yang Rui, team leader
- Huang Jingyu as Gu Shun, replacement sniper
- Hai Qing as Xia Nan, Chinese-French journalist
- Du Jiang as Xu Hong, deputy team leader, demolitions specialist
- Jiang Luxia as Tong Li, squad machine gunner and only female member
- Wang Yutian as Zhang Tiande ("Rocky"), squad machinegunner
- Yin Fang as Li Dong, spotter
- Henry Prince Mak as Zhuang Yu, squad signaller
- Guo Jiahao as Lu Chen, squad medic
- Huang Fenfen as Deng Mei a Greenville Energy corporation employee and hostage
- Zhang Hanyu as Gao Yun, fleet commander
- Jacky Cai as a PLA drone pilot
- Wang Qiang as Zhao Haiqiang, fleet commissar of the Chinese ship Linyi
- Simon Yam as Albert, chief editor of a local Moroccan newspaper and Xia Nan's boss
- Wang Yanlin as Luo Xing, the primary Jiaolong team sniper
- Sanâa Alaoui as Ena, a local Arabic village girl who helps the Jiaolong team
- Khalid Benchagra as Dr William Parsons, the corrupted head of the Greenville Energy Corporation
- Ayoub Layoussifi as Abu, Xia Nan's Arabic friend and co-worker
- Hassane Guannouni as Sayyid, The leader of the Zaka extremist group
- Mezouari Houssam as Taha, a young but deadly Arabic sniper in the Zaka extremist group

== Production ==
Principal photography began in mid-February 2017 in Morocco and employed 400 Moroccans and 300 Chinese as part of the technical crew group.

== Music ==
Operation Red Sea Original Motion Picture Soundtrack

Studio album by Elliot Leung
- Released: 2 February 2018
- Genre: Film soundtrack
- Length: 45:45
- Label: Plaza Mayor Company Ltd.

Elliot Leung composed the score to Operation Red Sea, and a digital album consisting of 22 tracks was released two weeks prior to the Chinese premiere on 2 February. A limited edition, autographed by both Elliot Leung and Dante Lam was given out only to those who were invited to the film premiere. Over the years, the music of Operation Red Sea has grown in popularity and has seen placements in various TV shows (most notably Guarding Our City) and concert suite performances by various orchestras.

== Reception ==
=== Box office ===
Operation Red Sea opened in fourth taking US$76.6 million and climbed to second in its second week, finally reached the top in its third week, taking US$144.2 million for US$498 million after 17 days. It won the international weekend with US$62.6 million to top Black Panther for the second frame in a row. The film led the Chinese film market in the third week earning RMB868 million while Detective Chinatown 2 earned RMB483 million and Monster Hunt 2 about RMB162 million. The film succeeded in moving to the top, knocking Detective Chinatown 2 to second place, while Monster Hunt 2 remained in third. After 23 days of release, Operation Red Sea grossed more than RMB3.4 billion and finally became the top grossing film of the Spring Festival of all time in China, surpassing the previous highest-grossing, The Mermaid (2016).

In the United States and Canada, Operation Red Sea took the highest gross, taking in US$510,000 in 45 theaters on its opening weekend averaging US$11,333, the best per-theater average among the specialty debuts. Distributor Well Go USA touted its launch, which outranked preceding weekend’s Detective Chinatown 2 when comparing straight averages, though that film played 115 runs in its debut.

=== Critical response ===
The review aggregator website Rotten Tomatoes reported an 80% approval rating based on 10 reviews, and an average rating of 8/10.

=== Accolades ===
| Award | Date of ceremony | Category | Recipient(s) and nominee(s) | Result | Reference |
|---|---|---|---|---|---|
| 8th Beijing International Film Festival | 22 April 2018 | Best Visual Effects | Operation Red Sea | Won | |
| 25th Beijing College Student Film Festival | 6 May 2018 | Best Film | Operation Red Sea | Won | |
| 25th Beijing College Student Film Festival | 6 May 2018 | Best Actor | Zhang Yi | Nominated | |
| 25th Beijing College Student Film Festival | 6 May 2018 | Best Visual Effects | Operation Red Sea | Nominated | |
| 14th Changchun Film Festival | | Best Feature Film | Operation Red Sea | Won | |
| 14th Changchun Film Festival | | Best Supporting Actor | Eric Wang | Nominated | |
| 14th Changchun Film Festival | | Best Supporting Actor | Huang Jingyu | Nominated | |
| 14th Changchun Film Festival | | Best Supporting Actress | Jiang Luxia | Won | |
| 14th Changchun Film Festival | | Best Cinematography | Feng Yuanwen | Won | |
| 34th Hundred Flowers Awards | | Best Picture | Operation Red Sea | Won | |
| 34th Hundred Flowers Awards | | Best Director | Dante Lam | Won | |
| 34th Hundred Flowers Awards | | Best Writing | Dante Lam, Feng Ji, Chen Zhuzhu, Lin Mingjie | Nominated | |
| 34th Hundred Flowers Awards | | Best Actor | Zhang Yi | Nominated | |
| 34th Hundred Flowers Awards | | Best Actress | Hai Qing | Nominated | |
| 34th Hundred Flowers Awards | | Best Supporting Actor | Zhang Hanyu | Nominated | |
| 34th Hundred Flowers Awards | | Best Supporting Actor | Du Jiang | Won | |
| 34th Hundred Flowers Awards | | Best Supporting Actress | Jiang Luxia | Won | |
| 34th Hundred Flowers Awards | | Best Newcomer | Wang Yutian | Won | |
| 34th Hundred Flowers Awards | | Best Newcomer | Huang Jingyu | Nominated | |
| 5th Hengdian Film and TV Festival of China | | Film Outstanding Contribution Award | Operation Red Sea | Won | |
| 17th New York Asian Film Festival | | Daniel A. Craft Award | Dante Lam | Won | |
| 31st Tokyo International Film Festival - Gold Crane Award | | Best Feature Film | Operation Red Sea | Won | |
| 31st Tokyo International Film Festival - Gold Crane Award | | Most Popular Actor | Huang Jingyu | Won | |
| 31st Tokyo International Film Festival - Gold Crane Award | | Best Actress | Hai Qing | Won | |
| 17th Huabiao Awards | 8 December 2018 | Outstanding Film | Operation Red Sea | Won | |
| 17th Huabiao Awards | 8 December 2018 | Outstanding Director | Dante Lam | Won | |
| 2019 ASCAP Awards | 15 May 2019 | ASCAP Screen Music Award | Elliot Leung | Won | |

== See also ==
- List of submissions to the 91st Academy Awards for Best Foreign Language Film
- List of Hong Kong submissions for the Academy Award for Best Foreign Language Film
