= Damai Entertainment Holdings =

Chinese film company

Damai Entertainment Holdings Limited
- Type: Division
- Industry: Film
- Predecessor: ChinaVision Media
- Founded: 2014; 12 years ago
- Headquarters: Zhejiang, China; Shanghai, China; Hong Kong
- Key people: Fan Luyuan (chairman & CEO)
- Parent: Alibaba Group
- Subsidiaries: Amblin Partners (30%)
- Website: www.damaiholdings.com

Damai Entertainment Holdings Limited is a Chinese film company under the Alibaba Group. The film company was formerly ChinaVision Media of which Alibaba Group bought a majority stake in late 2014. It subsequently was renamed from ChinaVision to Alibaba Pictures Group. In June 2025, Alibaba Pictures Group officially changed its name to Damai Entertainment Holdings. By April 2015, it was the largest Chinese film company by worth, with a market value of US$8.77 billion and by June of the same year it was worth US$9.6 billion.

According to researchers, Françoise Paquienséguy and Miao He, there are almost 30 companies, varying from investment groups to media and film studios, under the Alibaba umbrella. "These include, but are not limited to, such leading companies as Youku Tudou Inc., Enlight Media, Huayi Brothers, Bona Film Group, Wasu Media, Sina Weibo, XiamiMusic and Guangzhou Evergrande Taobao Football Club. In addition, Ma Yun also occasionally engages in capital operations, such as establishing Yunhuang and Yunxi Capital…" (Paquienséguy, He).

== History ==
In March 2014, Alibaba Group bought a 60% stake in ChinaVision Media for $805 million. Alibaba initially registered a film company in the following April with the name Alibaba Films Group before changing it to Alibaba Pictures Group later in the month. Two heads from ChinaVision were listed as directors of Alibaba Pictures. In June 2014, ChinaVision Media was officially renamed to be Alibaba Pictures Group. The following July, Zhang Qiang resigned as vice president of China Film Group to become the head of Alibaba Pictures. Later in the month, Alibaba Pictures entered agreements with filmmakers and film companies, including director Wong Kar Wai and the Hong Kong-based film production company Block 2.

The company purchased Yueke and at the end of 2015, Taobao Movie and Yulebao. On October 9, 2016, Amblin Partners struck a deal with Alibaba, in which Alibaba acquired a minority equity stake in the company and will handle marketing, distribution, and merchandising of Amblin Partners films in China in addition to co-financing Amblin and DreamWorks films worldwide. As described by the Financial Times, "Amblin Partners and Alibaba Pictures teamed up to "finance, produce, market and distribute films in China and globally." Alibaba Pictures released the projection in February 2017 that its unaudited 2016 losses could be over US$140 million. The company stated the losses resulted from a promotion known as Tao Piao Piao, where theater tickets are subsidized.

In July 2017, Alibaba increased its stake in Tao Piao Piao, an online ticketing platform, from 87.6% to 96.7%, for 1.3 billion yuan.

Alibaba Pictures has become a giant in film production and finance. Its success is not limited just to mainland China. Through its first domestic release See You Tomorrow, the company combined both mainland Chinese and Hong Kong values, reaching both audiences in new ways. The installment also saw "the ongoing mainlandization of Hong Kong filmmaking practice and the corresponding Hong Kongification of contemporary Chinese popular cinema," according to Mark Gallagher, author of "Alibaba Goes to the Movies."

Alibaba Pictures' mid-2010s expansion was not limited only to Hong Kong however.

2015 saw Alibaba Pictures' first investment in U.S. cinema, with their financial support of Mission: Impossible - Rogue Nation.

In 2016, Alibaba Group partnered with Steven Spielberg's Amblin Partners, an American film production company.

The partnership drew international attention, with Hollywood's highest-grossing director and one of the most active Chinese film studios coming together for production, distribution and financing.

In 2019, Alibaba Pictures financed 23 films, "accounting for one-fifth of China's total box office," according to Alizila, an Alibaba news outlet.

At a briefing regarding the partnership in Beijing, Spielberg was quoted by Reuters as saying, "Some of the stories I'm hoping Jack and I can tell in this new partnership between Amblin Partners and Alibaba Pictures will be able to bring Chinese-themed stories to the American audience, and we can do co-productions between our company and your company…"

Alibaba Pictures partnered with California-based STX, an American entertainment company, to bring "Peppa Celebrates Chinese New Year" to American silver screens in 2019.

After a substantial show of interest in the film on social media by Mandarin-speaking audiences STX and Alibaba partnered together for a U.S. release, with the goal of audiences being able to see the film in the United States while it was still in theaters in China according to STXfilms chairman Adam Fogelson in Yahoo Finance.

"The increasing appreciation for and interest in Chinese culture, the fact that the story of a family dynamic during the holiday, and the entry point of Peppa, which most American audiences are familiar with, creates a dynamic where there certainly could be — not on the Marvel level of course — broad interest," said Fogelson, "…Our first goal was to make sure that Mandarin speakers in the U.S. would have access to the film while the movie was playing in China."

In March 2024, Alibaba Group announced a HK$5 billion (US$640 million) investment over five years to boost Hong Kong's entertainment industry, investing in Hong Kong-made TV dramas, movies, performances and cultivation of young talents. The company also announced Alibaba Pictures will establish its second headquarters in Hong Kong.

In June 2025, Alibaba Pictures Group officially changed its name to Damai Entertainment Holdings Limited. Its business has expanded from film to a diversified ecosystem including performances, IP commercial derivatives, TV series, artist management, and ticketing platforms.

== Filmography ==
- Wolf Totem (2015) – distributor
- Terminator Genisys (2015) – investor
- Mission: Impossible – Rogue Nation (2015) – investor
- Little Door Gods (2016) - distributor
- The Mermaid (2016) - production
- Teenage Mutant Ninja Turtles: Out of the Shadows (2016) - investor
- Star Trek Beyond (2016) - investor
- League of Gods (2016) - production
- See You Tomorrow (2016) – production, distributor
- Journey to the West: Conquering the Demons 2 (2017) - production
- Real (2017) - investor, distributor (China)
- Once Upon a Time (2017) - production
- Paradox (2017) - production
- The Adventurers (2017) - production
- Dying to Survive (2018) - production
- Asura (2018)
- Mission: Impossible – Fallout (2018) - investor
- Next Gen (2018)
- Legend of the Ancient Sword (2018) - production, distributor
- Green Book (2018) - investor
- On the Basis of Sex (2018) - investor
- The Wandering Earth (2019) - Co-Producer
- Peppa Celebrates Chinese New Year (2019)
- UglyDolls (2019) - investor
- A Dog's Journey (2019) - investor
- The Climbers (2019) - production
- The Captain (2019) - production
- Gemini Man (2019) - investor
- 1917 (2019) - investor
- The Eight Hundred (2020) - production
- Chinese Doctors (2021) - production
- Green Snake (2021) - distributor
- The Battle at Lake Changjin (2021) - production
- Finch (2021) - investor
- Embrace Again (2021) - production
- The Battle at Lake Changjin II (2022) - production
- Return to Dust (2022) - production
- Moon Man (2022) - production
- Ordinary Hero (2022) - production
- Come Back Home (2022) - production
- Night at the Museum: Kahmunrah Rises Again (2022)
- Journey to the West (2023) - production
- Ride On (2023) - production
- Born to Fly (2023) - distributor
- Chang'an (2023) - production
- Meg 2: The Trench (2023) - Investor
- Just for Meeting You (2023) - production
- Taylor Swift: The Eras Tour (2023) - distributor (China)
- I Did It My Way (2024) - production
- YOLO (2024) - production
- Successor (2024) - production
- The Last Dance (2024) - production
- Maharaja (2024) - distributor
- Creation of the Gods II: Demon Force (2025) - production
- Dear You (2026) - co-production, distributor
- Creation of the Gods III: Creation Under Heaven (2027) - production
- Ao Jiao Yu Pian Jian (TBA)
- The Flying Tigers (TBA)
- Ge Jin Tao Hua (television series, TBA)
- The Legend of Zu 2 (television series, TBA)
- My Fair Princess animated film (TBA) - production
- No Other Love (TBA)
- Qi Huan Zhi Lv (TBA)
- Qing He Male College (TBA)
- Storming 30 Years (TBA)
- Sword of Legends 2 (TBA)
- Zhengtu (TBA)
- Untitled Giuseppe Tornatore film (TBA)
- Warriors (TBA)
- Steel Soldiers (TBA) - investor
