= Bona Film Group =

Chinese film company

Bona Film Group Company Limited
- Company type: Public
- Traded as: SZSE: 001330; Nasdaq: BONA
- Industry: Chinese cinema
- Founded: 1999; 27 years ago
- Founder: Yu Dong
- Headquarters: Beijing, China; Hong Kong
- Key people: Yu Dong (CEO); Xu Liang (CFO)
- Products: Film
- Website: www.bonafilm.cn

Bona Film Group Company Limited (simplified Chinese: 博纳影业集团有限公司; traditional Chinese: 博納影业集團有限公司, formerly known as Beijing Polybona Film Distribution Co. Ltd. (保利博纳电影发行有限公司) ), also known as Polybona Films or the Bona Film Group, is a Chinese production company and distributor of films from mainland China and Hong Kong. It is run as a subsidiary of the China Poly Group, and is one of China's largest share-holding film distribution companies.

It was named "the Chinese Miramax" by Screen International in 2005, and its CEO, Yu Dong, was described as one of "the future's most influential filmmakers" by The Hollywood Reporter in November 2006.

== History ==
Founded in 1999, Polybona was the first domestic private firm to receive a film distribution license from the SARFT. In November 2003, it merged with the China Poly Group, a wealthy business conglomerate wing of the Chinese military, the People's Liberation Army, to form PolyBona Film Distribution.

The company has distributed over 120 domestic and foreign films, including Confession of Pain, Protégé, The Myth, Initial D, and Dragon Tiger Gate, generating over RMB 1 billion (approximately US$130 million) in box office revenue, capturing over 20% of the overall market share for five years running.

It has also co-produced over 20 feature films, including The Warlords, Red Cliff, Flash Point, and After This Our Exile.

In 2007, Variety recognized the successful growth of Polybona Films, and wrote highly about its transforming from Miramax to Paramount.

In 2014, the company had a 10% share of the Chinese box office, earning CN¥3 billion from 12 films released.

In 2014, the company was the fourth-largest film distributor in China, with 5.99% of the market.

As of April 2015, the company was worth US$542 million.

In Q1 of 2015, it had a gross profit of US$45 million, a revenue of US$117.6 million, and a box office gross of US$257 million.

In November 2015, it was reported that Bona invested US$235 million in TSG Entertainment, resulting in a stake in six films distributed by 20th Century Fox, including The Martian (2015).

In 2016, the company had a market share of 9%, with a gross of CN¥3.7 billion (US$532.2 million).

== Filmography ==
=== Released ===
Year	Title	Director	Co-production company(s)	Distributor(s)	Box office	Ref.
2014	From Vegas to Macau	Wong Jing			$95,900,000 (China and international)	
2014	The White Haired Witch of Lunar Kingdom	Jacob Cheung			$64,200,000 (China and international)	
2014	The Taking of Tiger Mountain	Tsui Hark			$141,248,984 (China and United States)	
2015	From Vegas to Macau II	Wong Jing			$156,850,000 (China)	
2016	Operation Mekong	Dante Lam			$170,482,937 (China)	
2015	Sword Master	Derek Yee				
2015	Bride Wars	Tony Chan				
2015	Secret Treasure	Ronald Cheng, Gordon Chan				
2016	Billy Lynn's Long Halftime Walk	Ang Lee	TriStar Pictures; Studio 8 LStar Capital; Film4 Productions; The Ink Factory; Marc Platt Productions; TriStar Productions	Sony Pictures Releasing		
2016	Phantom of the Theatre	Raymond Yip				
2017	Paradox Kill Zone Bangkok	Wilson Yip				
2018	Operation Red Sea	Dante Lam				
2019	A Dog's Way Home	Charles Martin Smith	Columbia Pictures; Pariah Productions	Sony Pictures Releasing		
2019	Once Upon a Time in Hollywood	Quentin Tarantino	Columbia Pictures; Heyday Films	Sony Pictures Releasing		
2019	Ad Astra	James Gray	Regency Enterprises; Plan B Entertainment; RT Features; Keep Your Head Productions; MadRiver Pictures	20th Century Fox		
2019	Midway	Roland Emmerich	Summit Entertainment; Centropolis Entertainment; RuYi Media; Starlight Culture Entertainment Group; Street Entertainment; AGC Studios; Entertainment One	Lionsgate		
2020	Bloodshot	David S.F. Wilson	Columbia Pictures; Cross Creek Pictures; Original Film; Valiant Comics; Annabell Pictures; The Hideaway Entertainment	Sony Pictures Releasing		
2020	Enter the Fat Dragon	Kenji Tanigaki and Wong Jing		Mega-Vision Pictures (MVP)		
2021	The Battle at Lake Changjin	Chen Kaige; Tsui Hark; Dante Lam	August First Film Studio; Huaxia Film Distribution; China Film Co. Ltd. Shanghai Film Group; Alibaba Pictures; Beijing Dengfeng International Culture Communications Company		$909,596,236 (China and international)	
2022	The Battle at Lake Changjin II	Chen Kaige; Tsui Hark; Dante Lam	August First Film Studio; Huaxia Film Distribution; China Film Co. Ltd. Shanghai Film Group; Alibaba Pictures; Beijing Dengfeng International Culture Communications Company		$626,571,697 (China and international)	
TBA	Operation Leviathan	Dante Lam				
