= Huaxia Film Distribution =

Chinese film distribution company

- Native name: 华夏电影发行有限责任公司
- Industry: Film
- Headquarters: China

Huaxia Film Distribution (Chinese: 华夏电影发行有限责任公司) is a Chinese film distribution company. In 2014, the company was the second-largest film distributor in China, gaining 22.89% of the market.

== Filmography ==
- Drug War (2012)
- The Taking of Tiger Mountain (2014)
- Romance Out of the Blue (2015)
- Lost in White (2016)
- The BFG (2016)
- Never Gone (2016)
- A Busy Night (2016)
- A Chinese Odyssey Part Three (2016)
- Cock and Bull (2016)
- Soul Mate (2016)
- Mr. Donkey (2016)
- Some Like It Hot (2016)
- Out of Control (2017)
- Love Contractually (2017)
- Revenge for Love (2017)
- Secret Superstar (2017)
- UglyDolls (2019)
- The Battle at Lake Changjin (2021)
- The Battle at Lake Changjin 2 (2022)
- The Road Not Taken (2026)
