= Beijing Music Festival =

Festival in Beijing, China (est. 1998)

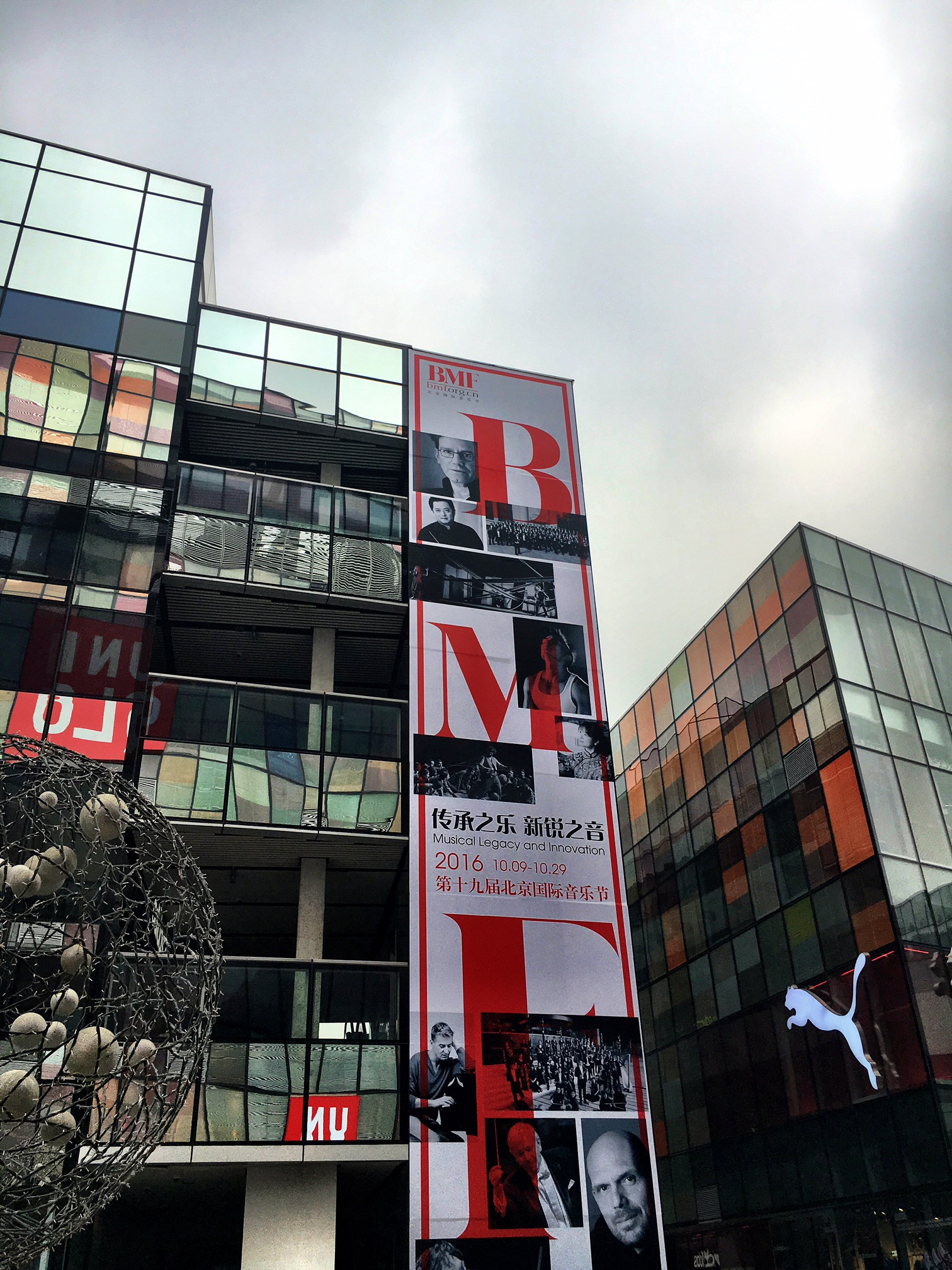
19th Beijing Music Festival at Sanlitun (October 2016)

The Beijing Music Festival (BMF) is an annual music festival held in Beijing which according to the Chinese Ministry of Culture has become one of the most well-known musical events in the world, drawing international attention. According to Chinaculture.org the festival presents about 30 concerts in October every year offering a wide variety of classical and jazz music including opera, orchestral, chamber, solo, and choral concerts. BMF also gives prominence to music education and community engagement offering free children's concerts and students' concerts, as well as master classes which draw about 6,000 music students, teachers, and spectators. It prides itself in presenting both Western and Chinese music alike.

According to Chinaculture.org notable performers that have appeared at the festival include Martha Argerich, Pinchas Zukerman, Jean-Yves Thibaudet, Emanuel Ax, Murray Perahia, Julian Lloyd Webber, Maxim Vengerov, Christoph Eschenbach, Tan Dun, Kathleen Battle, Du Yun, José Carreras, Sarah Chang, Augustin Dumay, Valery Gergiev, Mischa Maisky, Krzysztof Penderecki, Isaac Stern, Melvyn Tan, Fou Ts'ong, the Kodály Quartet, and the New London Consort.

In June 2018, the president and artistic director of BMF for 20 years, world-renowned Chinese conductor Long Yu, stepped down passing the artistic director role to Shuang Zou. Long Yu is now the chair of the artistic committee.

== History ==
Beijing Music Festival is a non-profit organization which was founded in 1998 by Long Yu, with the endorsement of the Ministry of Culture and the Beijing Municipal Government. The festival has presented numerous historical performances such as the China premiere of Gustav Mahler's Symphony No. 8 (2002), the Asian premiere of Alban Berg's opera, Lulu (2002); Guo Wenjing's operas, Ye Yan (2003) and Wolf Club Village (2003); and the China premiere of Richard Wagner's complete Ring Cycle (2005). The festival encourages the production of both Western and Chinese contemporary music presenting premieres and commissions by composers such as Krzysztof Penderecki, Philip Glass, Guo Wenjing, Ye Xiaogang, Tan Dun, and Howard Shore. BMF was among the first organizations in China to commission new works by Chinese composers as well as foreign composers, which has laid a strong base for international cultural exchange.

== Recent festivals ==
=== 2015 ===
According to CCTV BMF's 18th festival, held from October 8–24, 2015, included 18 performances by artists from over 30 countries and regions. The theme was "Revel in Romance" and focused on monumental works on opposite sides of the Romantic music spectrum – Johannes Brahms and Richard Wagner. Highlights included conductor Jukka-Pekka Saraste leading the WDR Orchestra in the ambitious Brahms 4 Plus 4 Project (four concertos and four symphonies) and Gustav Kuhn leading Tirol Festival Erl in Wagner's Die Meistersinger von Nürnberg and Tristan und Isolde.

=== 2016 ===
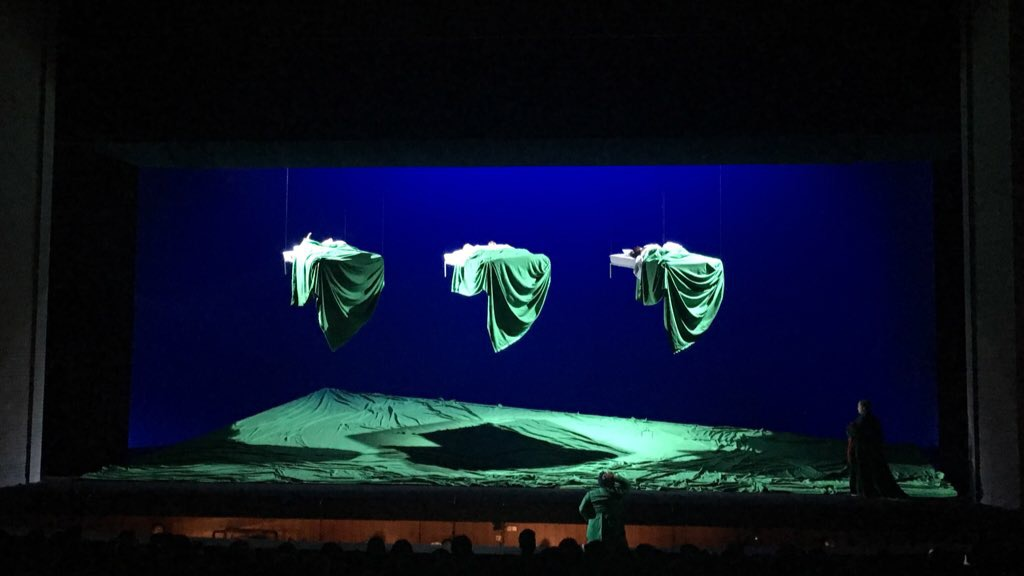
A Midsummer Night's Dream at the 19th Beijing Music Festival

The theme of BMF's 19th festival, which was held from October 9–29, 2016 was "Musical Legacy and Innovation." According to China Radio International the opening concert by China NCPA Orchestra and Chorus led by Lü Jia was the first collaboration between NCPA and BMF. The festival also presented the Chinese premiere of Benjamin Britten's A Midsummer Night's Dream directed by Robert Carsen to mark the 400th anniversary of Shakespeare's death and launched a five-year planned collaboration between BMF and Festival d'Aix-en-Provence. Other performances included Mozart's Don Giovanni presented as an immersive theatrical experience with visual effects; Blank Out, a 3D mini opera by Dutch composer Michel van der Aa; and the complete symphonic works of Tchaikovsky.

=== 2017 ===
Held from October 8 to 29, 2017, the theme of BMF's 2017 festival was "Beijing Music Festival at 20" to commemorate its 20th anniversary. Highlights of the 41 events and outreach activities included an 11-hour orchestral marathon with nine Chinese symphony orchestras, a joint production with Salzburg Easter Festival of Richard Wagner's opera Die Walküre with Hong Kong Philharmonic Orchestra under Jaap van Zweden, and the premiere of Qigang Chen's Violin Concerto by violinist Maxim Vengerov at the closing concert.

=== 2018 ===
Outreach events including the world premiere of the immersive opera, Orfeo, by Fay Kueen Wang a musical theater adaptation of Leoš Janácek's song cycle, The Diary of One Who Disappeared; George Benjamin's Written on Skin; The Orphan of Zhao; and two concerts celebrating Leonard Bernstein's centenary.

=== 2019 ===
With the theme "Timeless Music in the Future," BMF's 22nd festival was held from October 4–28, 2019. The festival presented 16 distinct programs including operas, symphonic concerts, recitals, chamber music concerts, and virtual reality music experiences. It began with an 8-hour performance of Max Richter's Sleep at the foot of the Great Wall of China. Additional performances included the Asian premiere of Eight, a mixed-reality musical theater work written by Michel van der Aa and co-commissioned by BMF; the 2017 Pulitzer Prize-winning opera Angel's Bone by Du Yun; and the China premiere of Handel's Xerxes performed by Opera Fuoco and David Stern. Guest artists included sopranos Renée Fleming and Edita Gruberová, pianist Jean-Yves Thibaudet, prodigy Alma Deutscher, maestros Long Yu, Vladimir Ashkenazy, Charles Dutoit, and Pinchas Zukerman, and BMF's first resident orchestra Mahler Chamber Orchestra, among others. BMF also presented the world premiere of Aaron Zigman's Tango Manos Piano Concerto.

=== 2020 ===
BMF's 23rd festival took place from October 10–20, 2020 and included 240 hours of non-stop music, for which the festival purchased all the copyrights in an effort to encourage fellow Chinese organizations to follow its lead. With the theme "Music Must Go On" in reference to the COVID-19 pandemic which shuttered many live performances worldwide, BMF presented music both online and offline. The opening concert featured the world premiere of "To 2020" by Wuhan composer Zou Ye and was performed by Wuhan musicians in honor of Wuhan, which suffered great losses due to the pandemic. For the first time, select BMF concerts were available for Western audiences to watch online via Facebook. Other concerts included several children's concert including a performance of Karen LeFrak's "Sleepover at the Museum"; a celebration of Beethoven's 250th anniversary including all ten of his violin sonatas, 32 piano sonatas, five piano concertos, and nine symphonies; a documentary in memory of conductor and composer Krzysztof Penderecki; the BMF debut of the Suzhou Chinese Orchestra; ten Music at Noon concerts; and the festival closing performance in celebration of China Philharmonic's 20th anniversary with five 20-year-old Chinese artists joining.

=== 2021 ===
"Masters and Celebrations" was the theme for BMF's 24th festival, which took place from October 9–24, 2021. The Festival presented 21 unique programs over 16 days. Five concerts are available to watch online including the closing gala conducted by Tan Dun featuring works the premiere of Dun's new version of Fire Ritual – War and Peace written for the world in the pandemic era. The festival presented the Chinese premiere of Stravinsky's The Rake's Progress performed by the Shanghai Symphony Orchestra in addition to the first Youth Music Festival featuring young musicians from Beijing, Hong Kong, and Macau. BMF also celebrated landmark anniversaries for composers including Stravinsky, Saint-Saëns, Vivaldi, Mahler, and Chinese composers Ding Shande, Qigang Chen, Tan Dun, and Wenjing Guo.

=== 2023 ===
Highlighting music from East and West, the 2023 Beijing Music Festival took place from September 22 to October 15. It was BMF's 25th/26th festival — postponed from 2022 because of Covid — and consisted of 28 performances. With the theme of Music·Youth·Future·Attitude, the festival opened with the world premiere of Homage to Liu Tianhua, in memory of Liu, China's pioneer of modern music. It was composed by Zou Ye and is based on Liu's instrumental music. At a September 26 jazz concert, the Icelandic cellist and singer Laufey Lin performed with the China Philharmonic Orchestra under Jin Yukuang. The Shanghai Quartet returned on October 2, performing Stravinsky's Pulcinella Suite and John Adams's Absolute Jest with the Shanghai Symphony Orchestra. From October 10 to 15, the Mahler Foundation Festival Orchestra performed four concerts with a "Dialogue with Mahler" theme, curated and conducted by conductor John Warner. Joined by a range of soloists including Wu Wei, Juxiao Fu and Yunpeng Wang they gave world premieres of works by Sasha Scott, Zhenyan Li, Wang Ying and Faykueen Wang and Chinese premieres of works by Sir George Benjamin and Olivier Messiaen. The festival also programmed the symphonic dance The Monkey King, composed by Liu Sola and inspired by the classic animated movie. On September 30, Beijing's Poly Theatre staged Pastoral for the Planet, a visual symphony by the Spanish avant-garde theater troupe La Fura dels Baus. Three concerts were also held at the Divine Music Administration of the Temple of Heaven. The festival concluded with the BMF Festival Orchestra Gala.

== Commissions ==
In commemoration of its 10th anniversary, BMF commissioned a second version of Krzysztof Penderecki's Symphony No. 8. The new version included an anonymous 15th-century Chinese poem and is 30 minutes longer than the original work. The commissioned version premiered on October 24, 2007, by the China Philharmonic Orchestra under the baton of its composer.

BMF co-commissioned Zhou Long's first opera, Madame White Snake, with Opera Boston, which marked the first collaboration between BMF and an American opera company. Based on the Chinese legend of the White Snake, the work was premiered in Boston by Opera Boston on February 26, 2010, and then in China on October 27, 2010, during the 13th Beijing Music Festival.

The BMF Arts Foundation commissioned Howard Shore's Ruin and Memory, a concerto for piano and orchestra written for and premiered by Lang Lang with the China Philharmonic conducted by Long Yu on October 11, 2010. The three-movement work was written in celebration of Frédéric Chopin's 200th anniversary. Shore commented "The piece is really my musical reflection of Chopin's time and the life he lived. The title captures a bit of Chopin's life, about where he came from and the world he lived in, and what became of him when that world no longer existed."

BMF commissioned the opera, Song of Farewell by Ye Xiaogang, and gave the world premiere during the closing concerts of the 13th festival, October 30 and 31, 2010. The work fuses Peking opera and Western opera with its traditional Chinese staging and Puccini-like score. The work is based on the Chinese film Farewell My Concubine.

== Education and outreach ==
BMF partners with the Central Conservatory of Music to hold master classes for music students with such musicians as Isaac Stern, Ken Nagano, Fou Ts'ong, Warren Mok, Melvyn Tan, Jian Wang, and the Kodály Quartet. They also hold free children's concerts, pre-performance lectures, and student concerts.

== Artistic committee ==
The artistic committee includes:

- Long Yu (chair), artistic director and chief conductor of the China Philharmonic and of the Shanghai Symphony Orchestra, music director of the Guangzhou Symphony Orchestra, and principal guest conductor of the Hong Kong Philharmonic Orchestra
- Gao Jianjin, dean of Music Education at Central Conservatory of Music
- Lang Lang, pianist and founder of Lang Lang International Music Foundation
- Li Liuyi, stage director
- Li Nan, president of China Philharmonic Orchestra and vice chairman of Poly Cultural Group
- Wang Cizhao, president of Central Conservatory of Music
- Xu PeiDong, composer and vice chairman of CFLAC, vice chairman of Chinese Musicians Association
- Song Tu, program director of Beijing Music Festival Arts Foundation （secretary-general since 2008）

== See also ==
- List of classical music festivals
- Long Yu
- List of festivals in China
