= Guangzhou Symphony Youth Orchestra =

Guangzhou Symphony Youth Orchestra (also known as Guangzhou Youth Orchestra or GSYO, Chinese: 广州学生交响乐团) is the affiliated youth orchestra of the Guangzhou Symphony Orchestra. Founded in July 2011, it is the first semi-professional student orchestra in China to be organized and administered by a professional orchestra. Its current Music Director is Huan Jing (Chinese: 景焕, Pinyin: jǐng hùan). The orchestra's members are selected from multiple cities in Guangdong Province. GSYO's rehearsals and training programs take place at the headquarters of the Guangzhou Symphony Orchestra. The administration and training follow the management guidelines of a professional ensemble.

GSYO was co-founded in July 2011 by the Guangzhou Symphony Orchestra and the Bureau of Education of Guangzhou Municipality with the assistance of the Guangdong Provincial Government and the Guangzhou Municipal Government. Prominent supporters include:

- Long Yu: Music Director, Guangzhou Symphony Orchestra
- Xian Zhang: former Associate Conductor, New York Philharmonic
- Yip Wing-sie: Music Director, Hong Kong Sinfonietta
- Guoyong Zhang: former Music Director, Shanghai Opera House
- Yang Yang: Music Director, Hangzhou Philharmonic Orchestra
- Yun Chen: President, China Chamber Music Society, and Concertmaster, China Philharmonic Orchestra.
- Lang Lang: pianist
- Maxim Vengerov: violinist

In September 2013, the GSYO launched its own independent performance season, and by the end of 2014, it had held more than thirty concerts for local school students.

On August 12, 2015, at the invitation of the government of Frankfurt, GSYO performed in Hoch Conservatory. More than 300 people were in the audience, among them Liang Jianquan (梁建全), the Consul General of China.

== See also ==
- List of youth orchestras
