= Howard Shore discography =

Howard Shore is a Canadian composer, conductor and orchestrator noted for his film scores.

He has composed the scores for over 80 films, most notably the scores for The Lord of the Rings and The Hobbit film trilogies. He won three Academy Awards for his work on The Lord of the Rings, with one being for the song "Into the West", an award he shared with Eurythmics lead vocalist Annie Lennox and writer/producer Fran Walsh, who wrote the lyrics. He is also a consistent collaborator with director David Cronenberg, having scored all but one of his films since 1979.

== Filmography ==
=== Film ===
==== 1970s ====
| Year | Title | Director | Other notes |
|---|---|---|---|
| 1978 | I Miss You, Hugs and Kisses | Murray Markowitz | |
| 1979 | The Brood | David Cronenberg | 1st of 18 collaborations with Cronenberg Nominated- Genie Award for Best Music Score |

==== 1980s ====
| Year | Title | Director | Other notes |
|---|---|---|---|
| 1981 | Scanners | David Cronenberg | |
| 1983 | Videodrome | David Cronenberg | |
| 1984 | Nothing Lasts Forever | Tom Schiller | 1st American film |
| 1984 | Places in the Heart | Robert Benton | Music producer |
| 1985 | After Hours | Martin Scorsese | 1st of 6 collaborations with Scorsese |
| 1986 | Fire with Fire | Duncan Gibbins | |
| 1986 | The Fly | David Cronenberg | |
| 1987 | Heaven | Diane Keaton | Documentary film |
| 1987 | Nadine | Robert Benton | |
| 1988 | Moving | Alan Metter | |
| 1988 | Big | Penny Marshall | |
| 1988 | Dead Ringers | David Cronenberg | Genie Award for Best Music Score |
| 1989 | Signs of Life | John David Coles | |
| 1989 | An Innocent Man | Peter Yates | |
| 1989 | The Lemon Sisters | Joyce Chopra | |
| 1989 | She-Devil | Susan Seidelman | |

==== 1990s ====
| Year | Title | Director | Other notes |
|---|---|---|---|
| 1990 | Postcards from the Edge | Mike Nichols | Composed with Carly Simon |
| 1990 | The Local Stigmatic | David Wheeler | |
| 1990 | Made in Milan | Martin Scorsese | Short film |
| 1990 | Quick Change | Howard Franklin; Bill Murray | Composed with Randy Edelman |
| 1991 | A Kiss Before Dying | James Dearden | |
| 1991 | The Silence of the Lambs | Jonathan Demme | Nominated- BAFTA Award for Best Film Music |
| 1991 | Naked Lunch | David Cronenberg | Nominated- Genie Award for Best Music Score |
| 1992 | Prelude to a Kiss | Norman René | |
| 1992 | Single White Female | Barbet Schroeder | |
| 1993 | Sliver | Phillip Noyce | |
| 1993 | Guilty as Sin | Sidney Lumet | |
| 1993 | M. Butterfly | David Cronenberg | |
| 1993 | Mrs. Doubtfire | Chris Columbus | |
| 1993 | Philadelphia | Jonathan Demme | |
| 1994 | The Client | Joel Schumacher | |
| 1994 | Ed Wood | Tim Burton | Nominated- Grammy Award for Best Score Soundtrack for Visual Media |
| 1994 | Nobody's Fool | Robert Benton | |
| 1995 | Seven | David Fincher | |
| 1995 | Moonlight and Valentino | David Anspaugh | |
| 1995 | White Man's Burden | Desmond Nakano | |
| 1996 | Looking for Richard | Al Pacino | Documentary film |
| 1996 | Before and After | Barbet Schroeder | |
| 1996 | The Truth About Cats & Dogs | Michael Lehmann | |
| 1996 | Ransom | Ron Howard | Unused score Replaced by James Horner |
| 1996 | Crash | David Cronenberg | |
| 1996 | Striptease | Andrew Bergman | |
| 1996 | That Thing You Do! | Tom Hanks | |
| 1997 | Cop Land | James Mangold | |
| 1997 | The Game | David Fincher | |
| 1999 | Gloria | Sidney Lumet | |
| 1999 | eXistenZ | David Cronenberg | |
| 1999 | Analyze This | Harold Ramis | |
| 1999 | Dogma | Kevin Smith | |

==== 2000s ====
| Year | Title | Director | Other notes |
|---|---|---|---|
| 2000 | High Fidelity | Stephen Frears | |
| 2000 | The Yards | James Gray | |
| 2000 | Esther Kahn | Arnaud Desplechin | |
| 2000 | The Cell | Tarsem Singh | |
| 2000 | Camera | David Cronenberg | Short film |
| 2001 | The Score | Frank Oz | |
| 2001 | The Lord of the Rings: The Fellowship of the Ring | Peter Jackson | 1st of multiple collaborations with Jackson Academy Award for Best Original Score; Grammy Award for Best Score Soundtrack for Visual Media; Critics' Choice Movie Award for Best Score; Nominated- BAFTA Award for Best Film Music; Nominated- Golden Globe Award for Best Original Score; Nominated- AFI Award for Composer of the Year |
| 2002 | Panic Room | David Fincher | |
| 2002 | Spider | David Cronenberg | Georges Delerue Award |
| 2002 | The Lord of the Rings: The Two Towers | Peter Jackson | Grammy Award for Best Score Soundtrack for Visual Media; Nominated- Critics' Choice Movie Award for Best Score |
| 2002 | Gangs of New York | Martin Scorsese | Nominated- BAFTA Award for Best Film Music |
| 2003 | The Lord of the Rings: The Return of the King | Peter Jackson | Academy Award for Best Original Score; Academy Award for Best Original Song (for "Into the West"; with Annie Lennox & Fran Walsh); Golden Globe Award for Best Original Score; Golden Globe Award for Best Original Song (for "Into the West"; with Annie Lennox & Fran Walsh); Grammy Award for Best Score Soundtrack for Visual Media; Grammy Award for Best Song Written for Visual Media (for "Into the West"; with Annie Lennox & Fran Walsh); Critics' Choice Movie Award for Best Score; Nominated- BAFTA Award for Best Film Music; Nominated- Satellite Award for Best Original Score |
| 2004 | The Aviator | Martin Scorsese | Golden Globe Award for Best Original Score; Critics' Choice Movie Award for Best Score; Nominated- BAFTA Award for Best Film Music; Nominated- Grammy Award for Best Score Soundtrack for Visual Media; Nominated- Satellite Award for Best Original Score |
| 2005 | A History of Violence | David Cronenberg | |
| 2005 | King Kong | Peter Jackson | Unused score Replaced by James Newton Howard |
| 2006 | The Departed | Martin Scorsese | Nominated- Grammy Award for Best Score Soundtrack for Visual Media; Nominated- Critics' Choice Movie Award for Best Score |
| 2007 | The Last Mimzy | Robert Shaye | |
| 2007 | To Each His Own Cinema | David Cronenberg | Segment: "At the Suicide of the Last Jew in the World in the Last Cinema in the World" |
| 2007 | Eastern Promises | David Cronenberg | Genie Award for Best Achievement in Music - Original Score; Nominated- Golden Globe Award for Best Original Score; Nominated- Satellite Award for Best Original Score |
| 2008 | The Betrayal – Nerakhoon | Ellen Kuras; Thavisouk Phrasavath | Documentary film |
| 2008 | Doubt | John Patrick Shanley | |

==== 2010s ====
| Year | Title | Director | Other notes |
|---|---|---|---|
| 2010 | Edge of Darkness | Martin Campbell | |
| 2010 | The Twilight Saga: Eclipse | David Slade | Twilight themes by Carter Burwell & Alexandre Desplat Nominated- Satellite Award for Best Original Song (for "Eclipse (All Yours)"; with Metric) |
| 2011 | A Dangerous Method | David Cronenberg | Genie Award for Best Achievement in Music - Original Score |
| 2011 | Hugo | Martin Scorsese | Nominated- Academy Award for Best Original Score; Nominated- BAFTA Award for Best Film Music; Nominated- Golden Globe Award for Best Original Score; Nominated- Grammy Award for Best Score Soundtrack for Visual Media; Nominated- Critics' Choice Movie Award for Best Score |
| 2012 | Cosmopolis | David Cronenberg | Canadian Screen Award for Best Original Score; Canadian Screen Award for Best Original Song (for "Long to Live"; with Emily Haines & James Shaw) |
| 2012 | The Hobbit: An Unexpected Journey | Peter Jackson | |
| 2013 | Jimmy P: Psychotherapy of a Plains Indian | Arnaud Desplechin | |
| 2013 | The Hobbit: The Desolation of Smaug | Peter Jackson | |
| 2014 | Maps to the Stars | David Cronenberg | Cannes Soundtrack Award; Canadian Screen Award for Best Original Score |
| 2014 | Rosewater | Jon Stewart | |
| 2014 | The Hobbit: The Battle of the Five Armies | Peter Jackson | |
| 2015 | Spotlight | Tom McCarthy | Nominated- Critics' Choice Movie Award for Best Score; Nominated- Satellite Award for Best Original Score |
| 2016 | Denial | Mick Jackson | |
| 2018 | The Catcher Was a Spy | Ben Lewin | |
| 2019 | The Song of Names | François Girard | |

==== 2020s ====
| Year | Title | Director | Other notes |
|---|---|---|---|
| 2020 | Le prince oublié | Michel Hazanavicius | |
| 2020 | Pieces of a Woman | Kornél Mundruczó | |
| 2020 | Funny Boy | Deepa Mehta | |
| 2022 | Crimes of the Future | David Cronenberg | 18th collaboration with Cronenberg |
| 2022 | The Pale Blue Eye | Scott Cooper | |
| 2025 | The Shrouds | David Cronenberg | 19th collaboration with Cronenberg |

=== Television films and series ===
- The Hart and Lorne Terrific Hour (1970, musical director)
- Saturday Night Live (1975–80, musical director)
- Steve Martin's Best Show Ever (1981)
- The New Show (1984)
- Big Shots in America (1985)
- Scales of Justice (1990–91)
- Late Night with Conan O'Brien (1993–2009, theme music)
- Nova (1997)
- POV (2009)
- The Tonight Show with Conan O'Brien (2009–10, theme music)
- The Lord of the Rings: The Rings of Power (2022, theme music)

=== Video games ===
- Soul of the Ultimate Nation (2007)
- Honor of Kings (2015)

== Selected concert music works ==
- Fanfare, organ (2008)
- The Fly, opera (2008)
- Ruin and Memory, piano concerto (2010)
- Mythic Gardens, cello concerto (2012)
- A Palace Upon the Ruins, song cycle (2014)
- The Forest, guitar concerto (2016)
- L'Aube (The Dawn), song cycle (2017)
