= Ding Shande =

Chinese composer

Ding Shande (Chinese: 丁善德; pinyin: Dīng Shàndé; Wade–Giles: Ting Shan-te; November 12, 1911 – December 8, 1995) was a Chinese composer, pianist, and music teacher.

== Biography ==
Ding was born in Kunshan, Jiangsu. He studied music with teachers including Huang Tzu at the Shanghai Conservatory of Music. Ding taught at the Shanghai Conservatory in the late 1930s. From 1947 to 1949, he studied composition in the Paris Conservatoire with Noël Gallon, Tony Aubin, and Nadia Boulanger. He also attended the courses of Arthur Honegger. From 1949, he taught at the Shanghai Conservatory again and became a vice president of the conservatory later. He died in Shanghai in 1995.

Ding's influential composition includes the Long March Symphony, symphonic suite New China, and the children's piano suite Happy Festival. He has also written theoretical works.

Renowned conductor Yu Long is Ding's grandson.

== Works ==
- Long March, symphony
- New China, symphonic suite
- Spring, symphonic Poem
- Symphonic Overture
- Piano Concerto in B flat major
- String Quartet in E minor
- Piano Trio in C major
- Ode to the Huangpu River, cantata
- Variations on Themes of Chinese Folk-songs, for piano
- Happy Festival, children's piano suite
- Xinjiang Dances Nos. 1 and 2, for piano
- Blue Mist, art song
- My Husband Gives Me a Sunflower, art song
- Ode to Orange, art song

== Discography (selection) ==
- The Long March Symphony (abridged version) - Nagoya Philharmonic Orchestra, Lim Kek-Tjiang, Marco Polo HK-1004, 1978.
- The Long March Symphony - Hong Kong Philharmonic Orchestra, Yoshikazu Fukumura, Marco Polo HK 6.240187/88, 1984.
- The Long March Symphony - Slovak Radio Symphony Orchestra, Yu Long, Marco Polo 8.223579, 1994.
- The Long March Symphony - Russian Philharmonic Orchestra, Mak Ka-Lok, Hugo Records, 1995.
- The Long March Symphony - Shanghai Symphony Orchestra, Yu Long, Deutsche Grammophon 0289 483 6449 7, 2019.
- Piano Concerto in B-Flat, op.23 - Louis Lortie, Shanghai Symphony Orchestra, Wong Khachun, Classic [Streaming Only], 2018.
- Children's Suite - Chen Jie, Naxos 8.570602, 2007.
- Spring Suite [and other piano works] - Ding Jiannuo, Marco Polo 82083, 2000.
- Xinjiang Dances Nos. 1 & 2 - Slovak Radio Symphony Orchestra, Adrian Leaper, Marco Polo 8.223408, 1991.
- Variations on a Chinese Folk Theme - Shanghai Philharmonic Orchestra, Cao Peng, Marco Polo 8.223956, 1995.
- Variations on a Xinjiang Folk Tune - Shanghai Philharmonic Orchestra, Cao Peng, Marco Polo 8.223956, 1995.
