= Cao Peng =

Chinese conductor (born 1925)

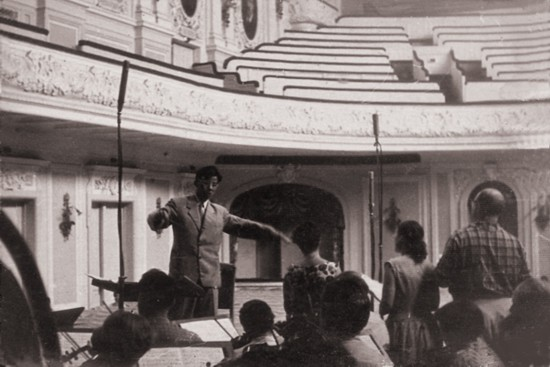
- Cao Peng in Moscow in 1960
- Born: 22 December 1925 (age 100); Jiangyin, Jiangsu, China
- Occupation: Conductor
- Years active: 1945–present

Cao Peng (Chinese: 曹鹏; born 22 December 1925) is a Chinese conductor.

== Background and early career ==
Cao Peng was born into one of the most influential families in the once thriving trading centre of Jiangyin, related both to Cao Yuyuan, the famous court censor of the late Qing, and more distantly to the great Cao family (of which the most famous scion was Cao Xueqin) that had risen in the world from the 18th century. Though the Chinese economy flirted with depression in his early years, and no region remain unaffected by the Kuomintang-CCP conflicts, and later the war against Japan, Cao was able to enjoy a happy upbringing and a solid education in his hometown.

Peng showed early promise as a musician, winning first place at his local high school. He is an alumnus of the Nanjing (南菁) Middle School in Jiangyin, set up by the reformer Huang Tifang in the 1880s. Cao Peng stayed in the institution until 1945, working for the final three years as an underground member of the Chinese Communist Party, into which role he was first employed by a violinist friend.

It was not until June, 1945 that Cao went open about his involvement with the party, enrolling in the Cultural Work Division of the New Fourth Army. Following the Communist victory of 1949, he was enrolled at the Huazhong Construction University, before later moving to the arts faculty of Shandong University to study conducting.

Upon graduation, Cao conducted the music for over ten early Communist films, including an adaptation into film of Lao She's Longxu Gulley. It was not until 1955, however, that what he would later describe as a turning point in his career would occur, when Cao Peng won a scholarship to study at the Gnessin State Musical College. He would study here for five and a half eventful years.

== Moscow and the Mao years ==
During his stay in Moscow, Cao Peng attended conducting masterclasses given by Leo Ginzburg, and began conducting the resident orchestra on regular occasions. In 1960, he gave the maiden overseas performance of the Butterfly Lovers' Violin Concerto, as part of the celebrations for the 10th anniversary of the establishment of government by the Communist party.

In August, 1961, Cao returned to China, where he was appointed permanent conductor in residence for the Shanghai Symphony Orchestra. He has remained based in Shanghai for the past fifty years, taking on a number of new positions and professorships as the city continued to open up beyond the Mao years.

The years before 1976 were not entirely inactive for Cao, however. In many respects, the classical music scene in Shanghai should remembered for its liveliness in the late Mao years, with pioneer conductors including Huang Yijun, Chen Chuanxi and Wang Yongji coming to the peaks of their respective careers. In 1962, Cao Peng collaborated with the Shanghai Opera House to give a performance of Puccini's Madama Butterfly, followed by later collaborations for performances of Manuel Da Falla's The Three-Cornered Hat and Delibes' Coppélia. In the shifting Shanghai of 1975, Cao was able to take his orchestra on an international tour, visiting and performing in Australia, New Zealand and Hong Kong.

== Professorships and charitable work, 1980s to present ==
A number of professorships were made available to Cao during the 1980s, including an appointment as professor in residence at the Shanghai Conservatory of Music and Shanghai Jiao Tong University.

At the same time as he was beginning the turn to teaching, and passing along the invaluable experiences of Moscow and beyond to the younger generation, so was he increasingly involved in a classical music scene in transition. Cao gave a countless number of performances in the 1980s, which took him not only further abroad, but to places unvisited within China, where he was able to cultivate and promote people's awareness of classical music. In 1986, a year when he was recognised by his adopted city Shanghai for his achievements with the city award for "Achievements in the Culture and Arts", Cao also accepted an invitation to conduct over 30 performances of classical music in southern China's Fujian province.

Similar success followed in the 1990s, when Cao, now in his sixties, took on responsibilities for the burgeoning orchestral music scene in Shanghai, conducting the Shanghai People's Orchestra (Chinese: 上海民族乐团) from 1992, later also the orchestra of the Nanyang Middle School. In 1993, at the age of 68, Cao was employed by the Hong Kong record label HNH to record a 50-CD anthology of modern Chinese classical music. Cao was also an early pioneer in the relaxing of tensions and building of cross-straits ties in the 1990s, heading the first classical music delegation to perform in Kaohsiung and other places throughout Taiwan in 1995, where he, incidentally, conducted publicly for the first time his daughter, the violinist Cao Xiaoxia (Chinese: 曹小夏).

Though he no longer keeps a schedule as demanding as that he kept in the 1990s, Cao has remained involved in a number of orchestras into the new millennium. He still regularly takes delegations abroad to perform, notably in France and Japan, and has set up two other, pathbreaking orchestras under the Cao Peng Music Center, established in 2005 – the Shanghai Student Orchestra and the Sound of Angel Salon, the latter of which trains autistic children to engage with their surroundings through music. He has also continued to conduct film scores, totalling over 100 over the course of his career.

== Awards ==
Cao has received many awards for his services to classical music and education inside China, including:

“Prize for Outstanding Contribution to Musical Performance”, awarded by the State Council.

“Prize for Pioneer Work Done in the Service of Chinese Culture”, awarded by the Central Affairs Committee.

The inaugural prize for “Arts and Literature” awarded by the Shanghai city Cultural Union.

“Prize for Outstanding Work in the Service of Education in Shanghai”, awarded by the Shanghai Educational Bureau.

An honorary prize awarded by Baogang steel.

Honorary prize on various occasions for services to the high arts.

Shanghai City Model Elderly Citizen Top Ten Award.

Double Personal Award for Contribution after Retirement to the Service of Society (Shanghai and National award).

In addition, concerts were held in his honour marking 40, 50, and most recently 60 years of conducting.

== See also ==
- Shanghai City Symphonic Orchestra
