= Chen Da Wei =

Chinese violinist

Chen Da Wei is a Chinese violinist serving as first violinist in the Singapore Symphony Orchestra. Born in Shanghai, Chen began studies on the violin at the age of eight. His teacher was Tan Shuzhen, a well-known violin professor at the Shanghai Conservatory of Music. Chen Da Wei was also a prize winner in the Shanghai Young Musician Competition. Chen was previously with the Shanghai Symphony Orchestra for eight years before joining the Singapore Symphony Orchestra in 1989.
