= Kūkai (film) =

2026 Chinese biographical documentary film

- Official film poster
- Chinese: 空海
- Directed by: Ye Yue
- Written by: Yaoming Long
- Based on: Life of Kūkai
- Produced by: Wang Hui
- Cinematography: Yuan Ji; Huajun Zhang
- Edited by: Yongjie Liu; Long Yinghao
- Music by: Zou Ye
- Distributed by: Wisdom Radiance Culture and Technology Limited (寶曜聖德文化科技有限公司)
- Release date: July 30, 2026 (Writers Guild Theater)
- Running time: 97 minutes
- Countries: China; Hong Kong
- Language: Mandarin Chinese
- Budget: CN¥24,000,000

Kūkai (also KŪKAI, in Chinese: 空海) is a Chinese docudrama film about the Buddhist monk Kūkai (774–835), who travelled from Japan to China, premiered in Los Angeles in 2026. The film was directed by Yue Ye.

The modern classical and film composer Zou Ye was commissioned by Yue Yongde to write the music for the film, and a concert of the music was performed by the London Philharmonic Choir at the Royal Festival Hall in London, conducted by Takuo Yuasa on 30 January 2026.

Preview screenings were held in Oxford and London, UK, in March 2026. The film premiered in Los Angeles, California, USA, on 30 July 2026, at the Writers Guild Theater in Beverly Hills.

The First International Forum on Inner Cultivation and Global Responsibility was organised by the creative team behind the film and co-organized with Xingyu Culture. It was held in Silicon Valley, in association with the premiere of the film, and explored spiritual renewal and technology for good in the age of Artificial Intelligence. The film itself used 3D computer animation in its creation, including the character of Kūkai himself.

== Plot ==
This historical biographical documentary film, directed by Yue Ye and written by Long Yaoming, covers the life of the Japanese Buddhist monk Kōbō Daishi Kūkai. After a dangerous 80-day journey by sea, on 10 August, 804 BCE, Kūkai arrived in Tang dynasty China to study Esoteric Buddhism, aiming to bring it back to Japan. The master Buddhist monk Maha Acharya Huiguo (746–805) had promised in his previous lives to teach Kūkai, and was expecting his arrival. After teaching Kūkai about Esoteric Buddhism, copies of the sutras were made in order to be brought back to Japan. Huiguo realised that the practice of Esoteric Buddhism would end in China, so he told Kūkai to teach the secret Dharma, which he brought back with him to Japan. Kūkai accepted the three-pronged vajra, a ritual object that had been passed down from the Indian monk Nagarjuna, a Bodhisattva, and departed from China in 806 BCE, at considerable risk. Several decades after Huiguo died, the Emperor Wuzong of Tang initiated the Huichang persecution of Buddhism in China. The Buddhist schools there were destroyed, ending Esoteric Buddhism in China. Kūkai's teachings led to Shingon Buddhism in Japan.

The film is not just a traditional historical documentary, but rather explores wider themes including compassion, cultural exchange, learning, and perseverance.
