= Huan Jing =

Huan Jing (Chinese: 景焕; pinyin: Jǐng Hùan) is the resident conductor of Guangzhou Symphony Orchestra, and the musical director of Guangzhou Symphony Youth Orchestra. She graduated from the Conducting Department of the Central Conservatory of Music, trained under the tutelage of Professor Xu Xin. In 2009, she obtained her master's degree in Orchestral Conducting at the University of Cincinnati College-Conservatory of Music (CCM), where she was awarded a full scholarship to continue her doctoral studies. She served as the conducting assistant of the Cincinnati Symphony Orchestra and May Festival (2011–2013); she was also the conducting assistant of the Cincinnati Symphony Youth Orchestra (2011–2013) and principal guest conductor of the Artaria Chamber Orchestra.

== Career ==
Jing was one of two prizewinners at the Li Delun National Conducting Competition held in Qingdao in June 2012. Later that summer, she participated in the Campos do Jordão International Festival in São Paulo, Brazil. Her outstanding performance led to an invitation to serve as assistant conductor of the São Paulo State Symphony, beginning in February 2013.

In the realm of opera, Jing has led the CCM Concert Orchestra in productions of Mozart’s The marriage of Figaro and Puccini’s Turandot. She has also conducted Stravinsky’s The Rakes’s Progress.

Jing has collaborated with the Croatian Radio Television Symphony Orchestra and Poland’s Podlaskie Opera and Philharmonic. During the summers of 2010 and 2011, she served as assistant conductor at the CCM Spoleto Festival in Italy.

In 2011 Jing received commendations from the Fifth Witold Lutoslawski International Competition for Young Conductors and the Fifth Lovro von Matačić International Competition of Young Conductors.

Jing has been resident conductor of the Guangzhou Symphony Orchestra (广州交响乐团) since September 2013. In December of that year, she made her critically acclaimed debut leading the ensemble in collaboration with Maxim Vengerov in Tchaikovsky’s Violin Concerto in D Major. She has taken the place of musical director of the Guangzhou Symphony Youth Orchestra (广州学生交响乐团) since 2014.
