= Elaine Wu =

Elaine Wu may refer to:

- Wu Yili (巫漪丽), Chinese-Singaporean pianist
- Elaine Ng Yi Lei (吳綺莉), Hong Kong actress
