= Yang Yang (conductor) =

Chinese conductor and artistic director

Yang Yang (杨洋) is the Chief Conductor and Artistic Director of the Hangzhou Philharmonic Orchestra. Yang has conducted more than 20 domestic and foreign symphony orchestras.

Yang started his career in 1998 at the first Beijing Musical Festival, and continued to conduct there for the next seven years. From 2000 to 2005, Yang held the position of Assistant Conductor at the China Philharmonic Orchestra, and is currently their Assistant Art Director. He became the Chief Conductor and Artistic Director of the Hangzhou Philharmonic Orchestra in 2009.

In November 2006, he won First Place at the Dimitris Mitropoulos International Competition for Orchestral Conducting in Greece. It was the first time a Chinese conductor received this honor.
