= Ruin and Memory =

Ruin and Memory is a piano concerto by the Canadian composer Howard Shore in 2010. The work was commissioned by the Beijing Music Festival Arts Foundation for the pianist Lang Lang in celebration of the 200th anniversary of the composer Frédéric Chopin. The world premiere was performed by Lang Lang and the China Philharmonic Orchestra conducted by Long Yu on October 11, 2010. Shore later composed the cello concerto Mythic Gardens as a companion piece to the work.

== Composition ==
Ruin and Memory has a duration of approximately 30 minutes and is cast in three movements:

1. Andante nobile
2. Largo
3. Prestissimo

=== Instrumentation ===
The work is scored for a solo piano and a small orchestra consisting of two flutes, two oboes, two bassoons, two horns, and strings.

== Reception ==
Richard Whitehouse of Gramophone wrote, "Ruin & Memory (2010) was written for Lang Lang, who takes on this first performance with his customary fluidity and flair. These qualities are central to a piece whose starting point was the life and musical ethos of Chopin, as reflected in its late-Classical orchestration and an emotional restraint that, in the central Largo, suggests pathos more Mozartian than Chopinesque." He added, "A pity that the finale (hardly taken Prestissimo as marked) ends with so juddering a final chord, but it does act as catalyst for the thunderous applause which ensues."
