= Zou Ye =

Chinese music composer

Zou Ye (Chinese: 邹野 born 20 October 1957 in Henan province, China), is a Chinese modern classical and film music composer. Zou was from the first generation of musical composition graduates from the Wuhan Conservatory of Music (then named the Hubei Academy of Fine Arts), when such education resumed with the end of the Cultural Revolution.

Subsequently, Zou became the resident composer at the Wuhan Dance Theatre. During his ten-year residency (1982-1992), he completed a large number of orchestral works and, at the age of 26, Zou composed Zheng He, a major opera based on the story of the ancient Chinese explorer with that name.

In 1992, Zou started his residency at the National Children’s Theatre in Beijing, where he remains the sole composer to this day. It was at the National Children’s Theatre that he composed and debuted his successful children’s musical Ma Lan Flower, which has since been performed for over a decade and enjoyed by millions of people. After Zou moved to Beijing, his musical compositions for films started to attract appreciation from a number of fourth and fifth generation Chinese filmmakers. For example, he worked closely with the director Huang Jianzhong on a number of major films, including the award-winning picture The Spring Festival. Zou also worked with director Yin Li on his major feature films The Knot and Zhang Side, and for both films Zou was nominated for the Best Musical Score award at respectively the 2005 and 2007 China Golden Rooster Awards. In 2008, Zou won the Best Musical Composition award for the score he composed for the feature film The Heart of Ice, directed by Xu Geng, at the Chang Chun Film Festival. Zou was invited by Maestro Yu Long to write a concert piece called the Dialogue between Beijing Opera and Western Opera, which premiered in 2010 at the opening concert of the Sino-Italian cultural exchange in Rome, to celebrate 40 years of diplomatic relations between China and Italy. This event was attended by the then Chinese Prime Minister Wen Jiabao and Italian Prime Minister Silvio Berlusconi.

In 2011 and 2012, Zou was awarded the honorary title of achieving the most TV/Film compositions in the past 20 years.

Zou became the honorary resident composer at the China Philharmonic Orchestra and in 2012 completed his most recent orchestral work The Drunken Concubine, which was performed in Berlin, Czech Republic and most recently at the Lincoln Centre in New York. The latter was performed by the New York Philharmonic Orchestra for the 2013 Chinese New Year Concert.
