= Fou Ts'ong =

British pianist (1934–2020)

Fou Ts’ong
- 傅聰
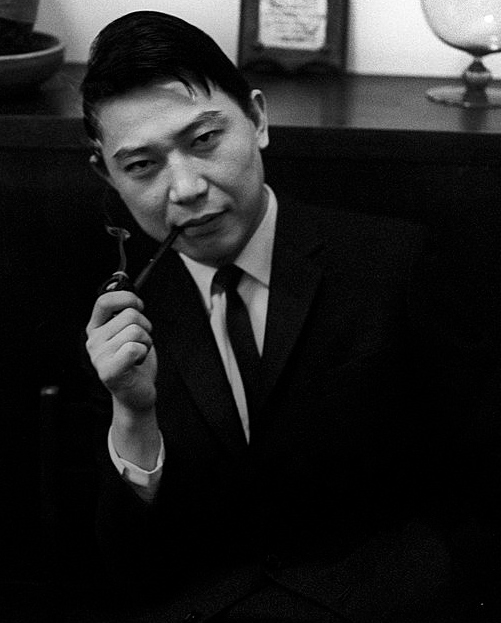
- Fou Ts'ong in 1965
- Born: 10 March 1934; Shanghai, China
- Died: 28 December 2020 (aged 86); London, England
- Occupation: Pianist
- Spouse: Zamira Menuhin (m. 1960; div. 1969) Hijong Hyun (m. 1973; div. 1976) Patsy Toh (m. 1987)
- Parent: Fu Lei (father)

Chinese name
- Traditional Chinese: 傅聰
- Simplified Chinese: 傅聪
Transcriptions
Standard Mandarin
- Hanyu Pinyin: Fù Cōng

Fou Ts'ong (Chinese: 傅聰; pinyin: Fù Cōng; 10 March 1934 – 28 December 2020) was a Chinese and British pianist who was the first pianist of his national origin to achieve international recognition. He came to prominence after winning third prize and the Polish Radio Prize for the best performance of Chopin's mazurkas in the 1955 V International Chopin Piano Competition, and remained particularly known as an interpreter of Chopin's music.

== Early life ==
Fou Ts'ong was born in Shanghai on 10 March 1934 to a family of intellectuals; his father was the translator Fu Lei. Fou's parents Fu Lei and Zhu Meifu were persecuted during the Cultural Revolution and committed suicide in September 1966. Fou Ts'ong had a brother named Fu Min.

Fou first studied piano with Mario Paci, the Italian founder of the Shanghai Symphony Orchestra.

== Career ==
=== Early career ===
In 1951, Fou made his debut in his hometown of Shanghai, performing Beethoven's Piano Concerto No. 5. Subsequently, officials in Beijing selected Fou to perform and compete in eastern Europe. In 1953, he won the third prize at the George Enescu International Competition. That year, at the age of nineteen, he moved to Europe to continue his training at the State College of Music in Warsaw (now the Fryderyk Chopin University of Music in Warsaw) with Zbigniew Drzewiecki. In 1955, Fou won the third prize and the Polish Radio Prize for the best performances of Chopin's mazurkas in the V International Chopin Piano Competition. While studying in Warsaw, he gave concerts in Eastern Europe.

=== International career ===
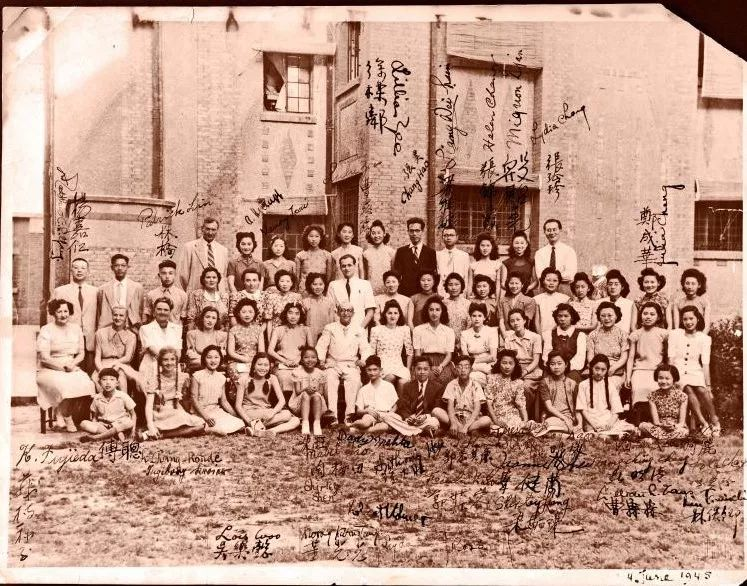
Mario Paci (second row centre) with his colleagues and students in Shanghai, 1945. In the front row are two of his youngest students: Fou (front left) and Wu Yili (front right).

In 1958 or 1959, Fou settled permanently in London, and soon began giving concerts in Europe and the United States. In 1959, he performed under Carlo Maria Giulini at the Royal Albert Hall. He made his debut with the New York Philharmonic under Paul Paray in Chopin's Piano Concerto No. 2 (Op. 21) in November 1961. Harold C. Schonberg of The New York Times called Fou a "sincere musician", but was otherwise critical of the performance, calling his conception of the piece "heavy and sometimes awkward, with little of the grace, charm or sophistication that the Chopin F minor contains".

Fou was nominated for a Grammy for most promising new classical artist in 1963 for a recording of Scarlatti's sonatas. In 1964, he made his New York recital debut at Town Hall. The New York Times was more favourable in its review of this recital than his New York Philharmonic debut, noting his "admirable lyricism" in playing Mozart, Schubert, and Debussy. He subsequently returned to New York several times; reviewing a 1987 recital at Alice Tully Hall, Bernard Holland of The New York Times described Fou as "an artist who uses his considerable pianistic gifts in pursuit of musical goals and not for show", and noted his "sensitive ear for color and that elusive gift of melody, whereby linear movement stretches and contracts in order to explain harmonic tensions." In 1967, Fou performed the Grieg Piano Concerto with the BBC Symphony Orchestra under Sir Colin Davis as part of the First Night of the Proms. Around that time, he also performed in a piano trio with Hugh Maguire and Jacqueline du Pré. He also performed in Australia, South America and the Far East.

He remained associated throughout his career with playing Chopin, and Fou's recital programmes often included several of his works. Writing in 1960, Hermann Hesse said of Fou's playing of Chopin that he surpassed the previous masters, Padereweski, Fischer, Lipatti, Cortot. Indeed hearing Fou, he said, was to hear the "pure gold" of Chopin himself playing. Speaking of his playing, Hesse said: "It breathed the fragrance of violets, of rain in Majorca and also of exclusive salons, it rang of melancholy and rang of modishness, the rhythmic definition was as sensitive as the dynamics. It was a wonder." James Methuen-Campbell, in Fou's entry in Grove's Dictionary, also notes his interpretations of Debussy, Mozart and late Schubert, highlighting his "delicate touch and keen sensibility". Fou's playing gained praise from fellow musicians. In 1965, Martha Argerich acknowledged the influence of his recordings when she won the International Chopin Competition. In 1994, Fou's friends and fellow pianists Argerich, Leon Fleisher and Radu Lupu jointly issued a CD entitled The Pianistic Art of Fou Ts'ong; in the CD's sleeve notes, they declared Fou "one of the greatest pianists of our times". The Chinese pianist Lang Lang has described Fou as a role model, praising his "unique" understanding of music. Among his other recordings are the Chopin mazurkas for Sony and the Mozart Piano Concerto No. 7 for three pianos with Vladimir Ashkenazy, Daniel Barenboim, and the English Chamber Orchestra.

He was a member of the Queen Elisabeth Music Competition's jury in 1991, 1999, 2003, 2007, and 2010. He also served on the jury of the Chopin Competition in 1985 and 2010, and on the jury of the Paloma O'Shea Santander International Piano Competition in 2002.

== Personal life and death ==
From 1960 to 1969, Fou was married to Zamira Menuhin, the daughter of Yehudi Menuhin, with whom he had one son. Their marriage ended in divorce. A brief marriage to Hijong Hyun from 1973 to 1976 also ended in divorce. In 1987, Fou married the Chinese pianist Patsy Toh, with whom he had one son.

Fou died from COVID-19 in London on 28 December 2020, during the COVID-19 pandemic in England at age 86.
