= Jean Rémusat =

Jean Rémusat (French: [ʒɑ̃ ʁemyza]; 1815–1880) was a French flautist, composer of music for the flute, and conductor. In later life he lived in Shanghai.

== Life ==
Rémusat was born in Bordeaux in 1815. From 1830 he studied at the Paris Conservatoire with flautist Jean-Louis Tulou, in 1832 winning first prize. He moved to London, where he was first flute at the Queen's Theatre. The theatre closed in 1853, and he returned to Paris, playing solo flute at the Théâtre Lyrique.

About 1865, Rémusat moved to Shanghai. He founded the Shanghai Philharmonic Society; in 1879 he was appointed the first conductor of the Shanghai Public Band, which later became the Shanghai Symphony Orchestra.

Rémusat died in Shanghai in 1880.

== Compositions ==
He composed music for the flute, duets for flutes, and for flute and violin, and operatic transcriptions.
