= Wu Yili =

Chinese-Singaporean pianist (1931–2019)

- Also known as: Elaine Yi-Li Wu
- Born: 1931; Shanghai, Republic of China
- Died: 20 April 2019 (aged 87–88) Singapore
- Genres: Classical
- Occupation: Musician
- Instrument: Piano
- Years active: 1948–2019
- Spouse: Yang Bingsun (div. 1966)

Chinese name
- Simplified Chinese: 巫漪丽
Transcriptions

Wu Yili (Chinese: 巫漪丽; 1931 – 20 April 2019), also known as Elaine Yi-Li Wu, was a Chinese-Singaporean classical pianist. A member of the first generation of Chinese pianists, she served as the first solo pianist of the China National Symphony Orchestra and arranged the piano accompaniment for the Butterfly Lovers' Violin Concerto. After suffering persecution during the Cultural Revolution, she moved to the United States before settling in Singapore. Following the release of two acclaimed albums in her old age, she was rediscovered by Chinese music lovers and became a social media sensation in her 80s.

== Early life ==
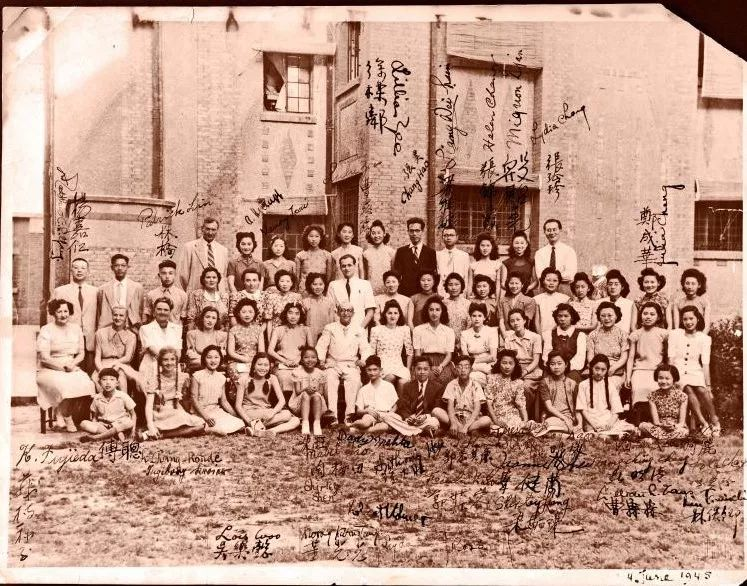
Mario Paci (second row centre) with his colleagues and students in Shanghai, 1945. In the front row are two of his youngest students: Wu Yili (front right) and Fou Ts'ong (front left).

Wu was born in 1931 into a prominent family in Shanghai, Republic of China, with her ancestral home in Heyuan, Guangdong province. Her father Wu Zhenying (巫振英) was a US-educated architect, and her mother Li Huiying (李慧英) was the daughter of Li Yunshu, a wealthy capitalist who helped finance Sun Yat-sen's revolution.

At age six, Wu heard Frédéric Chopin's Fantaisie-Impromptu from an American movie, and became determined to learn to play the piano. She won the first prize in Shanghai Children's Piano Contest after playing for only a year, and began studying with the Shanghai-based Italian musician Mario Paci at the age of ten. She graduated from Shanghai Peicheng Girls' School (上海培成女子中学).

== Career ==
Wu made her public debut at the Shanghai Lyceum Theatre in 1948. Her performance of Beethoven's Piano Concerto No. 1, accompanied by Shanghai Symphony Orchestra, made her famous in China.

In 1954, she joined the Central Philharmonic Orchestra in Beijing, and became its first solo pianist a year later. Recognized as one of China's top pianists, she frequently performed for foreign leaders visiting China and went on tours abroad.

After the debut of the Butterfly Lovers' Violin Concerto in 1959, Wu was the first to make a piano arrangement for the work, and the first to perform it at the celebration of the 10th anniversary of the founding of the People's Republic of China that year. It was one of the most famous performances of her career. She was personally received by Premier Zhou Enlai in 1962.

After the end of the Cultural Revolution, Wu moved to the United States in the 1980s, before settling in Singapore in 1993. In Singapore, Wu taught piano and lived in relative poverty and obscurity. With the financial support of one of her students, she released her first album in 2008 at the age of 77, followed by the second five years later. Both albums were highly acclaimed, and she was praised for her expressiveness and her extensive knowledge of Chinese music. Her second album won the 2013 Top 10 Records award of Guangdong Musicians' Association. She also publicised the music of her native Guangdong province, including arranging Yule Shengping (娛樂昇平).

In 2017, a video of the 86-year-old pianist playing the Butterfly Lovers became popular on Chinese social media. She gave a public performance in Singapore that year and was honoured with the World Outstanding Chinese Artist Award in June. In 2018, she collaborated with violinist Lü Siqing in a new rendition of the Butterfly Lovers.

== Personal life ==
Wu married Yang Bingsun (杨秉荪), the lead violinist of the Central Philharmonic Orchestra, where she worked at.

During the Cultural Revolution (1966–1976), Yang was denounced as a "counter-revolutionary" and imprisoned for ten years. Wu was forced to divorce him in order not to be implicated, but was still beaten by the Red Guards and suffered long-term injuries in her feet.

Wu died on 20 April 2019 at Singapore General Hospital, after losing consciousness while attending a concert at the Victoria Theatre and Concert Hall. She was 88.
