= The Knot (2006 film) =

- Promotional poster
- Traditional Chinese: 雲水謠
- Simplified Chinese: 云水谣
- Literal meaning: The Song of the Clouds and Waters
- Hanyu Pinyin: Yún shǔi yáo
- Directed by: Yin Li
- Written by: Liu Heng; Zheng Kehui
- Produced by: Yin Li
- Starring: Chen Kun; Vivian Hsu; Li Bingbing
- Cinematography: Wang Xiaole
- Edited by: Zhan Haihong
- Music by: Zou Ye
- Distributed by: CFGC; EMP; Long Shong Entertainment Multimedia Co. Ltd.
- Release date: 1 December 2006
- Running time: 117 minutes
- Country: China
- Languages: Mandarin; Hokkien

The Knot (Chinese: 雲水謠) is a 2006 Chinese romantic drama film directed by Yin Li. It won the Best Film award in the 2007 Golden Rooster Awards, and was named Outstanding Film by the 2008 Hundred Flowers Awards. The film was China's submission to the 80th Academy Awards for the Academy Award for Best Foreign Language Film, but was not nominated.

== Plot ==
They fell in love; Chen Qiushui was 20. Wang Biyun was 18. When Qiushui fled Taiwan after the 228 Massacre, Biyun gave him a gold engagement ring and they promised to meet again. Qiushui served as an army doctor during the Korean War, where he met Wang Jindi, a nurse from Shanghai who fell in love with him instantly. Years had gone by, Qiushui married Jindi and settled in Tibet. While in Taiwan, Biyun buried Qiushui's mother and continued to pray for his return.

Flashback to modern time, Biyun is living in New York. Her niece played by Isabella Leong, a writer, has travelled to Tibet to find out what happened to Qiushui. Through the pictures she sends back via internet, Biyun finally gets to see the familiar face once again.

== Cast ==
- Chen Kun as Chen Qiushui / Chen Kunlun
- Vivian Hsu as Wang Biyun
  - Gua Ah-leh as elderly Wang Biyun
- Li Bingbing as Wang Jindi
- Chin Han as Wang Tingwu
- Yang Kuei-mei as Xu Fengniang
- Isabella Leong as Wang Xiaorui
- Steven Cheung as Xue Zilu
- Athena Chu as Mrs. Wang

== See also ==
- Cinema of China
- List of submissions to the 80th Academy Awards for Best Foreign Language Film
