= Patsy Toh =

Patsy Toh 卓一龍
- Born: 1940 (age 85–86); Shanghai, China
- Genres: Classical
- Instrument: Piano
- Spouse: Fou Ts'ong

Patsy Toh (Chinese: 卓一龍; pinyin: Zhuō Yīlóng; Wade–Giles: Cho I-lung; Pe̍h-ōe-jī: Toh It-liông; born 1940) is a Chinese-born pianist living in London, England. She has taught at the Royal Academy of Music since 1975, and became a Fellow in 1995.

== Early life ==
Toh was born in Shanghai, China, in 1940 of a family from Xiamen, the family returned to Gulangyu Island shortly after her birth. In 1948 at the age of 8, she won first prize in the Hong Kong Music Competition and in 1952 at the age of 12 went to Westonbirt School, a boarding school in England.

== Education ==
At 13, Toh passed 8th Grade and entered the Royal Academy of Music at 16. While still a student she won the Royal Overseas League Competition in London. Toh was awarded a scholarship to study with Yvonne Lefébure at the Paris Conservatoire, where she won a Premier Prix. She also studied with Alfred Cortot, Dame Myra Hess, and Aube Tzerko (a pupil of Artur Schnabel).

== Career ==
Toh has often performed as a pianist in Europe, China, and the Americas. She has served as a professor of piano at the Royal Academy of Music and a member of the keyboard department at the Purcell School for Young Musicians. Toh is a regular visiting professor to music conservatories in Shanghai, Hong Kong, Taiwan, and Singapore, and has taught at Yehudi Menuhin Schools.

== Personal life ==
Toh was married to Fou Ts'ong, a pianist, for over three decades until his death in 2020. They had one son. She lives in London, England.
