= Hangzhou Philharmonic Orchestra =

Hangzhou Philharmonic Orchestra (Chinese: 杭州爱乐乐团) was founded on December 25, 2007 and completed its establishment on April 20, 2009, with Deng Jingshan as the President, Yang Yang as the Artistic Director and Chief Conductor, Guan Haochuan and Lin Shangzhuan as the Vice President. Besides, Ning Feng, the famous violinist, and Qin Liwei (Chinese: 秦立巍), the famous cellist, are the Resident Artists of the Orchestra while Xue Biao is the Concertmaster and Xu Weiling the Guest Concertmaster.

There are totally 80 musicians including several foreign performers.

In 2024, the orchestra along with the Shanghai Symphony Orchestra and the Chengdu Symphony Orchestra co-commissioned Wuxia by composer Elliot Leung. The premiere opened their 24-25 season.

== See also ==
- List of Symphony Orchestras in Greater China -PRC. HKSAR. Macao SAR and Taiwan
