= Shanghai City Symphony Orchestra =

Chinese amateur music group

The Shanghai City Symphony Orchestra (Chinese: 上海城市交响乐团) is China’s only non-profit amateur orchestra, a member of the World Federation of Amateur Orchestras (WFAO). The orchestra was established in 2005 by octogenarian conductor Cao Peng, under the supervision of the Cao Peng Music Center. The intention of the orchestra is to provide a free and accessible platform for the spread of classical music in Shanghai and the rest of China. Unlike other orchestras in China, the orchestra operates on a no-profit basis, bringing together both foreign and native Chinese musicians living in Shanghai to rehearse for national and international performances. It has several youth orchestras, but also, under the direction of Cao Peng's daughter, Cao Xiaoxia, has begun in the last two years an initiative for an orchestra for the autistic, a world first.
