= Mario Paci =

Italian pianist and conductor

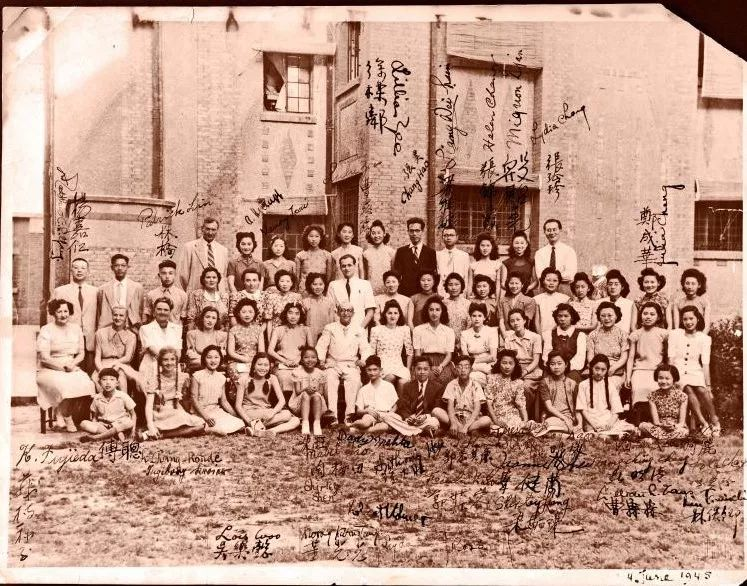
Mario Paci (second row center) with his colleagues and students in Shanghai, 1945. In the front row are two of his youngest students: Fou Ts'ong (front left) and Wu Yili (front right).

Mario Paci (June 4, 1878 – August 3, 1946), also known by his Chinese name Mei Baiqi (Chinese: 梅百器), was an Italian pianist and conductor who was instrumental in establishing classical European music in China.

== Life ==
Paci was born in Florence. He attended the Naples Conservatory and in 1895 won the Franz Liszt Prize. Afterwards, he undertook extended tours across all of Europe. Through the support of Giacomo Puccini, he was able to study composition and conducting at the Milan Conservatory.

In December 1918, Paci went to Shanghai to perform at the Olympic Theater. He was hospitalized after falling ill, and ended up deciding to stay in Shanghai. In 1919, he took the leadership of the predecessor of Shanghai Symphony Orchestra, the oldest symphony orchestra in Asia, which had been founded in 1879 as a military wind band. Paci succeeded in having the orchestra grow from 22 to 37 members and gave the first symphonic concert in Asia on November 23, 1919. On the program was Beethoven's fifth symphony, the serenade for strings "In the Far West" by Granville Bantock, and Edvard Grieg's Peer Gynt Suite No. 1.

In 1922 the orchestra was renamed the Shanghai Municipal Council Symphony Orchestra. Initially, the audience was composed of foreigners living in Shanghai, who numbered about 20,000; at this time Chinese were not permitted to attend the concerts. Persistent pleas by Paci to the officials led to the loosening of these restrictions. This also applied to the orchestra itself, which originally was composed exclusively of foreigners, but later incorporated Chinese musicians.

Paci's support also contributed to the founding of the National Special School for Music (國立上海音樂專科學校), which was renamed the Shanghai Conservatory in 1956. This school, established by Cai Yuanpei and Xiao Youmei, was the first conservatory in Asia. Among the teachers there who were also members of the orchestra was the German composer Wolfgang Fraenkel (1897-1983), who fled Germany in 1938, and violinist Tan Shuzhen.

A high point in the history of the orchestra was the Chinese premiere of Beethoven's ninth symphony on April 14, 1936, under the direction of Paci; by this point many Chinese were in the orchestra, although they were not among the singers.

After Japanese invaded China in 1937 and the beginning of the Second World War, the situation for the orchestra became more severe. Paci was forced to dissolve the orchestra after giving his final performance on May 31, 1942. It was reestablished in October 1950, four years after Paci died in Shanghai.

Paci trained some of China's first pianists, including Fou Ts'ong, Wu Yili, Wu Leyi (吴乐懿), Zhu Gongyi (朱工一), and Zhou Guangren (周广仁).

== See also ==
- Huang Yijun, leader of the Shanghai Symphony Orchestra during the PRC era
