= Tan Shuzhen =

Tan Shuzhen (simplified Chinese: 谭抒真; traditional Chinese: 譚抒真; 1907 – 2002) was a Chinese violinist, teacher and violin maker. In 1927, he became the first Chinese musician to join the Shanghai Municipal Public Band, now the Shanghai Symphony Orchestra, led by Italian conductor Mario Paci. "Nobody had ever seen a Chinese in the orchestra," Tan has been quoted as saying. "So many people came to see me."

Until 1966, Tan headed the Conservatory's violin section and became involved in the establishment of China's first violin-making factory. During the Cultural Revolution, Tan was confined for 14 months in a tiny, dark closet under a stairwell at the Conservatory. He suffered regular beatings and denunciations before being released to work as a janitor. When the Cultural Revolution ended, he became the vice-director of the Shanghai Conservatory of Music.

Tan features prominently in Sheila Melvin and Jindong Cai's Rhapsody in Red: How Western Classical Music Became Chinese and in Murray Lerner's 1979 documentary, From Mao to Mozart: Isaac Stern in China. Tan is the subject of Heather Greer's 1999 documentary, The Gentleman From Shanghai.
