= Howard Shore =

Canadian film score composer (born 1946)

Howard Shore OC
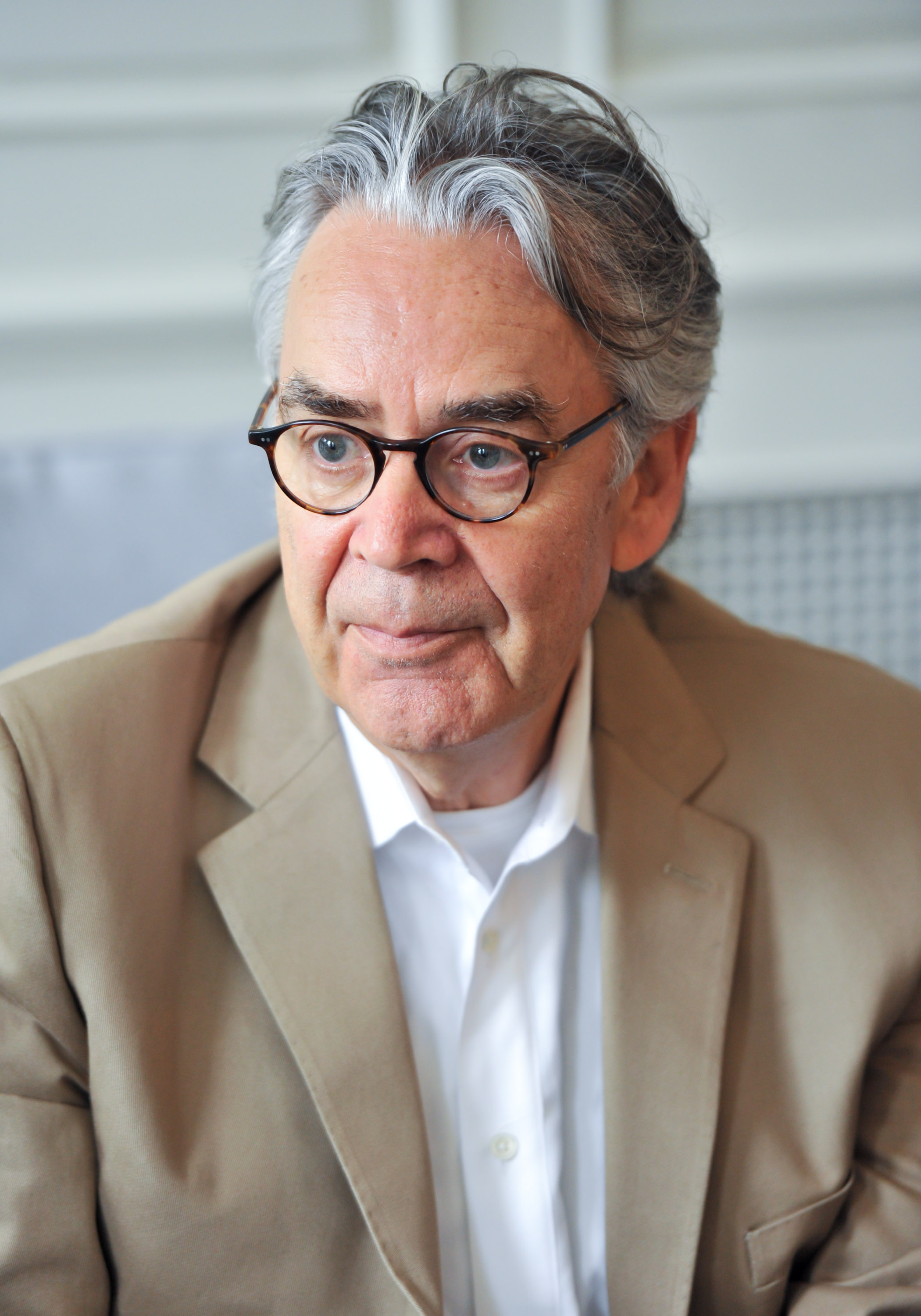
- Shore in 2013

Background information
- Born: Howard Leslie Shore; October 18, 1946 (age 79); Toronto, Ontario, Canada
- Genres: Film score, classical
- Occupations: Composer, orchestrator, conductor, music producer
- Instruments: Piano, organ, clarinet, flute, alto saxophone
- Years active: 1969–present
- Formerly of: Lighthouse
- Spouse: Elizabeth Cotnoir (m. 1990)
- Website: howardshore.com

Howard Leslie Shore (born October 18, 1946) is a Canadian composer, conductor, and orchestrator noted for his film scores. He has composed the scores for over 80 films, most notably the scores for Peter Jackson's The Lord of the Rings and The Hobbit film trilogies, both of which are based on the fantasy works by English author J. R. R. Tolkien. He is a consistent collaborator with director David Cronenberg, having scored all but one of his films since 1979, and collaborated with Martin Scorsese on six of his films.

Shore has also composed concert works including one opera, The Fly, based on the plot of Cronenberg's 1986 film, a film he also scored, which premiered at the Théâtre du Châtelet in Paris on July 2, 2008; a short piece named Fanfare for the Wanamaker Organ and the Philadelphia Orchestra; and a short overture for the Swiss 21st Century Symphony Orchestra. Shore has also composed for television, including serving as the original musical director for the American sketch comedy show Saturday Night Live from 1975 to 1980.

Shore won three Academy Awards for his work on The Lord of the Rings, with one being for the song "Into the West", an award he shared with Eurythmics lead vocalist Annie Lennox and writer/producer Fran Walsh, who wrote the lyrics. In addition to his three Oscars, he has also won three Golden Globe Awards, four Grammy Awards, three Genie Awards, and nine Canadian Screen Awards.

== Early life and career ==
Shore was born in Toronto, Ontario, Canada, the son of Jewish parents Bernice (née Ash) and Mac Shore. He started studying music around the age of 8 or 9. He learned a multitude of instruments and began playing in bands at the ages of 13 and 14. When Shore was 13, he met and became good friends with a young Lorne Michaels in summer camp, and this friendship would later be influential in his career. By 17, he decided he wanted to pursue music in his adult life too. He studied music at Berklee College of Music in Boston after graduating from Forest Hill Collegiate Institute.

From 1969 to 1972, Shore was a member of the jazz fusion band Lighthouse. In 1970, he became the music director for Lorne Michaels and Hart Pomerantz's short-lived TV program The Hart & Lorne Terrific Hour. Shore wrote the music for Canadian magician Doug Henning's magic musical Spellbound in 1974 and, from 1975 to 1980, he was the musical director for Michaels' influential late-night NBC sketch comedy show Saturday Night Live, appearing in many musical sketches, including Howard Shore and His All-Nurse Band, and dressed as a beekeeper for a Dan Aykroyd/John Belushi performance of the Slim Harpo classic "I'm a King Bee". Shore also suggested the name for the Blues Brothers to Aykroyd and Belushi.

== Film scoring ==
=== 1978–2000 ===
Shore's first film score was for the low-budget thriller I Miss You, Hugs and Kisses (1978), followed by David Cronenberg's first major film, The Brood (1979). He went on to score all of Cronenberg's subsequent films, with the exception of The Dead Zone (1983), which was scored by Michael Kamen. The first film he scored that was not directed by Cronenberg was Martin Scorsese's After Hours (1985). Following that, he scored The Fly (1986), again directed by Cronenberg. Two years later, he composed the score to Big (1988), directed by Penny Marshall and starring Tom Hanks. He then scored two more of David Cronenberg's films: Dead Ringers (1988) and Naked Lunch (1991).

During 1991, Shore composed the score for the highly acclaimed film The Silence of the Lambs, starring Jodie Foster and Anthony Hopkins, and directed by Jonathan Demme. He received his first BAFTA nomination for the score. The film became the third (and most recent) to win the five major Academy Awards (Best Picture, Best Director, Best Screenplay, Best Actor, and Best Actress). Shore is the only living composer to have scored a "Top Five" Oscar-winning film.

During 1993, he composed the scores for M. Butterfly (another collaboration with Cronenberg), Philadelphia (his second collaboration with Jonathan Demme), and Mrs. Doubtfire, directed by Chris Columbus. The latter two films were highly successful, Philadelphia winning Tom Hanks his first Oscar.

Shore scored another three films in 1994: The Client, Ed Wood, and Nobody's Fool. Ed Wood is notable for being one of the three films directed by Tim Burton that did not feature a score by Danny Elfman.

Shore continued to score numerous films from 1995 to 2001, including two David Fincher films, Seven (1995) and The Game (1997), and The Truth About Cats and Dogs (1996), directed by Michael Lehmann; he also collaborated on two films with Cronenberg, along with Tom Hanks' directorial debut, That Thing You Do!. He scored Kevin Smith’s Dogma (1999). Shore also composed the score of the 2000 film The Cell.

=== 2001–2006 ===
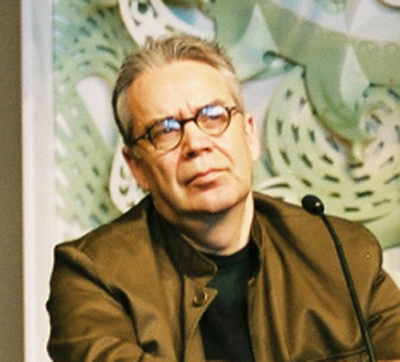
Shore at a press conference for The Lord of the Rings in Wellington, New Zealand, 2003

Major success came in 2001 with his score to The Lord of the Rings: The Fellowship of the Ring, the first film in the highly acclaimed The Lord of the Rings trilogy. The news that Shore would score the trilogy surprised some, since he was primarily associated with dark, ominous films and had never scored an epic of this scale. Yet, the score was hugely successful and won Shore his first Oscar, as well as a Grammy Award, and garnered Shore nominations for a Golden Globe and a BAFTA.

The following year, Shore composed the scores to Panic Room, Gangs of New York (replacing Elmer Bernstein), and The Lord of the Rings: The Two Towers, the second film in the trilogy (the latter two films were both nominated for the Academy Award for Best Picture). Though Shore's score for The Two Towers was going to be deemed ineligible for submission to the academy due to a new rule disallowing the submission of scores which contained themes from previous work, the implementation of this rule change was postponed, and the score remained eligible. The Two Towers score did not receive an Academy Award nomination, but Shore did receive a BAFTA nomination for Gangs of New York.

In 2003, Shore composed the score for the final film in The Lord of the Rings trilogy, The Lord of the Rings: The Return of the King. The film was the most successful film in the trilogy and the most successful of the year. Shore won his second Oscar for Best Original Score, as well as a third for Best Original Song for "Into the West", which he shared with Fran Walsh and Annie Lennox. Shore also won his first Golden Globe, his third and fourth Grammy (the fourth for Best Song), and was nominated for a third BAFTA. The scores of The Lord of the Rings, performed primarily by the London Philharmonic Orchestra, became some of the most successful film scores ever written and are the biggest success in Shore's career so far. The score has been repeatedly and continually voted as the best film score in history; the review site Filmtracks named Shore's scores "arguably the most respected and impressive trilogy of music of all time: Howard Shore's massive work for Peter Jackson's The Lord of the Rings." As of April 2023, Shore is currently in litigation with Star-Entertainment Berlin over their unauthorized use of his music from The Lord of the Rings and The Hobbit in poor quality concerts, following a concert on 1 April 2023 at the Portsmouth Guildhall which was reportedly so poor that every audience member was given a full refund and the production company were banned from the premises permanently.

In 2004, Shore again collaborated with Martin Scorsese, scoring Scorsese's epic The Aviator, this time with the Brussels Philharmonic. He won a second Golden Globe for the score, becoming the third composer to have won consecutive Golden Globes in the Original Score category. He also received his sixth Grammy nomination, and his fifth BAFTA nomination.

He collaborated again with David Cronenberg in 2005 to score A History of Violence, starring Viggo Mortensen (who played Aragorn in the Rings trilogy). The film was a success and received two Oscar nominations. In 2006, he collaborated for the fourth time with Martin Scorsese, this time to score The Departed. That film was highly successful, and won four Oscars including a long-awaited win for Scorsese, and the Oscar for Best Picture.

Although Shore was originally commissioned to compose the soundtrack for King Kong, he was later replaced by James Newton Howard due to "differing creative aspirations for the score" on his and the filmmakers' parts. This was a mutual agreement between himself and Peter Jackson. Despite this, Shore has a cameo near the end of the film as the conductor of the orchestra in the theater, performing portions of Max Steiner's score to the original 1933 version of the film.

=== 2007–present ===
In 2007, Shore composed the music for Soul of the Ultimate Nation, an online multiplayer video game, featuring Lydia Kavina on the theremin. During 2007 he also composed the scores for The Last Mimzy and Eastern Promises, the latter of which includes a section that has been performed in concert as Shore's Concertino for violin solo and chamber orchestra. Eastern Promises was another collaboration with David Cronenberg and earned Shore his fourth Golden Globe nomination. In 2008, he scored Doubt, starring Meryl Streep and directed by John Patrick Shanley. The film was a success, earning five Oscar nominations.

In 2010, Shore composed the score to Eclipse, the third installment in the Twilight film series, following Carter Burwell and Alexandre Desplat, who scored the first and second films, respectively. He then replaced John Corigliano to score Edge of Darkness, starring Mel Gibson.

Shore's 2011 projects were A Dangerous Method, continuing his long-term collaboration with director David Cronenberg. He composed the score to Martin Scorsese's Hugo, his fifth collaboration with the director, which earned him a sixth Golden Globe nomination and fourth Oscar nomination.

He created the score to Peter Jackson's The Hobbit film series. In addition, Shore composed the opening theme for The Lord of the Rings: The Rings of Power on Amazon.

== Conducting and performing ==
Since 2004, he has toured the world conducting local orchestras in the performance of his new symphonic arrangement of his highly acclaimed Lord of the Rings scores. The new work is entitled The Lord of the Rings: Symphony in Six Movements. There are two movements for each of the movies, and an intermission between the second and third (or first and second film titles) movements. The concert presentation of the symphony also includes projected still images of sketches by John Howe and Alan Lee relating the music being performed to scenes from the films. Recently, however, Shore has been busy with other projects, leaving other conductors including Markus Huber, Ludwig Wicki, Alexander Mickelthwaite, and John Mauceri to lead the orchestras.

April 24, 2008, marked the North American Live to Projection debut of Fellowship of the Ring, with the score performed live by the Winnipeg Symphony Orchestra, conducted by Ludwig Wicki. Wicki also conducted the Filene Center Orchestra at the Wolf Trap Farm Park in Vienna, Virginia on May 21 and 22, 2008 in the U.S. premiere of the Fellowship of the Ring Live to Projection.

September 16, 2010, Shore conducted the RSO Vienna (Vienna Radio Symphony Orchestra) which performed "In Dreams from The Fellowship of the Ring" at Hollywood in Vienna in Vienna, Austria. Shore was commissioned by Macy's to write a Fanfare for the Store's 150th anniversary featuring the Philadelphia Orchestra and the Wanamaker Organ, the world's largest playing pipe organ. The work was debuted in the Grand Court of Macy's Philadelphia Store on September 27, 2008, in a concert that drew reviews from most of the major East Coast newspapers.

Shore's opera The Fly had its world premiere performance at the Théâtre du Châtelet in Paris on July 2, 2008, and its United States premiere at Los Angeles Opera on September 7, 2008. The production was directed by David Cronenberg and conducted by Plácido Domingo. The Fly had a new production mounted by Theatre Trier in Germany in 2014 staged by Sebastian Welker and conducted by Joongbae Jee.

Shore was commissioned by the Beijing Music Festival to write Ruin and Memory, a piano concerto, for the pianist Lang Lang. The world premiere was on October 11, 2010, performed by Lang Lang, The China Philharmonic Orchestra and conducted by Long Yu. His second concerto, Mythic Gardens, premiered April 27, 2012, with Sophie Shao on cello solo, The American Symphony Orchestra and conducted by Leon Botstein.

Shore's song cycle A Palace Upon the Ruins premiered in 2014 at the Bridgehampton Chamber Music Festival and at the La Jolla SummerFest featuring mezzo-soprano Jennifer Johnson Cano. A Palace Upon the Ruins is a song cycle of six songs with words by Elizabeth Cotnoir.

Sea to Sea was commissioned by New Brunswick Youth Orchestra in celebration of Canada's 150th anniversary of confederation and premiered on July 2, 2017, in Moncton, New Brunswick, with soloist Measha Brueggergosman and Antonio Delgado conducting. Sea to Sea has lyrics by Elizabeth Cotnoir.

The song cycle L'Aube premiered October 19 & 20, 2017 in Toronto at Roy Thompson Hall conducted by Peter Oundjian and performed by soloist Susan Platts and commissioning orchestra, the Toronto Symphony Orchestra. L'Aube consists of five songs with text by Elizabeth Cotnoir.

The Forest a guitar concerto composed for Miloš Karadaglić premiered in Ottawa on May 1 & 2, 2019 with the National Arts Centre Orchestra and Alexander Shelley conducting.

== Television ==
In addition to writing the original theme song for Saturday Night Live, as well as the closing theme, Shore also co-wrote the theme song for Late Night with Conan O'Brien with John Lurie. The theme was carried over to The Tonight Show when O'Brien succeeded Jay Leno as host.

In September 2021, it was reported that Shore was in talk to compose the music for the upcoming The Lord of the Rings TV series on Amazon Prime Video, returning from the Lord of the Rings and Hobbit films; the series was eventually scored by Bear McCreary with Shore writing the main title theme for the opening credits only.

== Radio ==
Shore narrated a one-hour CBC Radio documentary/soundscape on music in thriller/suspense film genres also including references to radio dramas and other media. The episode was called "Unsettling Scores" and premiered on the program called Inside the Music.

== Personal life ==
He is the uncle of film composer Ryan Shore.

As of 2004, Shore lives in Tuxedo Park, New York. Shore is married to Elizabeth Cotnoir, a writer, producer and documentary filmmaker. He has one daughter.

== Filmography ==
- The Brood (1979)
- Scanners (1981)
- Videodrome (1983)
- Places in the Heart (1984)
- After Hours (1985)
- The Fly (1986)
- Big (1988)
- Dead Ringers (1988)
- The Silence of the Lambs (1991)
- Naked Lunch (1991)
- Mrs. Doubtfire (1993)
- Philadelphia (1993)
- The Client (1994)
- Ed Wood (1994)
- Seven (1995)
- Crash (1996)
- That Thing You Do! (1996)
- Cop Land (1997)
- The Game (1997)
- Analyze This (1999)
- Dogma (1999)
- High Fidelity (2000)
- The Cell (2000)
- The Score (2001)
- The Lord of the Rings: The Fellowship of the Ring (2001)
- Panic Room (2002)
- The Lord of the Rings: The Two Towers (2002)
- Gangs of New York (2002)
- The Lord of the Rings: The Return of the King (2003)
- The Aviator (2004)
- A History of Violence (2005)
- The Departed (2006)
- Eastern Promises (2007)
- The Last Mimzy (2007)
- Doubt (2008)
- Edge of Darkness (2010)
- The Twilight Saga: Eclipse (2010)
- A Dangerous Method (2011)
- Hugo (2011)
- Cosmopolis (2012)
- The Hobbit: An Unexpected Journey (2012)
- The Hobbit: The Desolation of Smaug (2013)
- Maps to the Stars (2014)
- Rosewater (2014)
- The Hobbit: The Battle of the Five Armies (2014)
- Spotlight (2015)
- Denial (2016)
- The Song of Names (2019)
- Pieces of a Woman (2020)
- Crimes of the Future (2022)
- The Pale Blue Eye (2022)
- The Shrouds (2025)

== Awards and honours ==
Shore has received four Academy Award nominations, winning three, two for Best Original Score, for The Lord of the Rings: The Fellowship of the Ring (2001), and The Lord of the Rings: The Return of the King (2003). He also won the Oscar for Best Original Song for "Into the West" from The Lord of the Rings: The Return of the King. He received his fourth nomination for his work on Hugo.

Shore has also received six Golden Globe nominations, winning three awards: for Best Original Score for The Lord of the Rings: The Return of the King (2003) and The Aviator (2004) and Best Original Song for "Into the West" from The Lord of the Rings: The Return of the King, making him the second composer (after Alan Menken) to have received consecutive Golden Globe Awards for Best Original Score. He also won three consecutive Grammy Awards for Best Score for each of the Lord of the Rings films, and received a second award in 2003 for the song "Into the West" from Return of the King in the category of Best Song. He has also received five BAFTA nominations, but has not won.

On June 11, 2007, Shore was awarded an Honorary Doctor of Letters Degree from York University in Toronto for "his sweeping artistic vision". This award was shared with the year's commencement ceremony and the University focused heavily in Shore's honor, including The Lord of the Rings theme playing throughout the event.

Shore has also been honored with awards from The National Board of Review, Recording Academy Honors, The Broadcast Film Critics, Chicago Film Critics, Genie Award, World Soundtrack Award, New York's Gotham Award, and The Saturn Award for Science Fiction.

Shore is the first recipient of the Film & TV Music Award for Best Score for a Science Fiction Feature Film for The Last Mimzy.

In May 2008, he was awarded an Honorary Doctorate of Music from Berklee College of Music during Berklee's commencement ceremony at the Agganis Arena.

On September 16, 2010, he was awarded the Max Steiner Film Music Achievement Award by the City of Vienna at the yearly film music gala concert Hollywood in Vienna.

In 2012, he received Canada's Governor General's Performing Arts Awards for Lifetime Artistic Achievement.

In 2016, he was appointed as an Officer of the Order of Canada for his work towards the film and music industry.

== See also ==
- List of film director and composer collaborations
