= Chen Chuanxi =

Chinese conductor

Chen Chuanxi (simplified Chinese: 陈传熙; traditional Chinese: 陳傳熙), (May 1916 in Xining, Guangxi – January 27, 2012), is a Chinese conductor. He is regarded, along with Han Zhongjie, Li Delun and Yin Shengshan, as one of the Four Great Chinese Conductors.

After beginning his career as a librettist and conductor during the War against Japanese Occupation, he worked simultaneously at the Shanghai City Orchestra and Shanghai Music Academy from 1949.
