= Mythic Gardens =

Cello concerto

Mythic Gardens for Cello and Orchestra is a cello concerto by the Canadian composer Howard Shore. The work was commissioned for the cellist Sophie Shao by the American Symphony Orchestra with financial contributions from Linda and Stuart Nelson. It was completed in 2012 and was given its world premiere by Shao and the American Symphony Orchestra under the conductor Leon Botstein in the Richard B. Fisher Center for the Performing Arts at Bard College on April 27, 2012. Shore composed Mythic Gardens as a companion piece to his 2010 piano concerto Ruin and Memory.

== Composition ==
Mythic Gardens has a duration of roughly 20 minutes and is composed in three movements:

1. Cimbrone
2. Medici
3. Visconti Borromeo Litta

The movements are named after three classic Italian gardens, whose architecture provided Shore's inspiration for the work.

=== Instrumentation ===
The concerto is scored for a cello solo and an orchestra comprising two flutes, two oboes, two clarinets, two bassoons, three horns, harp, and strings.

== Reception ==
Mythic Gardens has received a mixed response from music critics. Reviewing the concerto's West Coast premiere, Richard S. Ginell of the Los Angeles Times described the piece as "mostly a continuous lyrical song for cello -- ardently surveyed by cellist Sophie Shao -- rambling pleasantly along until the third movement where at last there was some dialogue with the orchestra." He added, "It's listenable, yet it evaporated from memory within minutes." Richard Whitehouse of Gramophone wrote, "The first two movements might have benefited from greater expressive contrast but the final Presto banishes any lingering wistfulness with its purposeful sense of resolution."
