= Kodály Quartet =

Hungarian string quartet

The Kodály Quartet is a string quartet founded in 1966 in Budapest, Hungary, originally as Sebestyén Quartet. In 1969, with the approval of the Ministry of Cultural Affairs of the Hungarian Republic, the quartet assumed its present name in honour of the Hungarian composer Zoltán Kodály.

The ensemble tours internationally, and has recorded the complete cycles of Haydn, Beethoven and Schubert for the Naxos label. Its discography exceeds sixty recordings, mainly for Naxos.

== Members ==
The quartet's present members are:

- Attila Falvay 1st violin
- Ferenc Bangó 2nd violin
- Zoltán Tuska viola
- György Éder violoncello

== Awards ==
- Ferenc Liszt Award (1970)
- Artist of Merit of the Hungarian Republic (1990)
- Bartók-Pasztory Award (1996)
- Classic CD Magazine's Best Chamber Music Release (1993)

== Select Notable Reviews ==
- BBC Music Magazine's Pick of the Month, April 2000
- American Record Guide, July/August 2000
- Strad Magazine, February 2001
- MusicWeb UK, February 2001
- Gramophone, December 2002
- Classic Today, June 2005
- The Penguin Guide to Compact Discs (several listings, including one "Rosette")

== Sources ==
- Archives of the Ferenc Liszt Society
- Archives of the Order of Merit of the Hungarian Republic
- Archives of the Bartók-Pásztory Foundation
- Archives of the publishers of Classic CD Magazine
- Archives of the British Broadcasting Corporation, BBC Music Magazine
- The Penguin Guide to Compact Discs, ISBN 978-0-14-051497-1
- Archives of the Ferenc Liszt Music Academy in Budapest, Hungary
- Kodály Quartet entry in the German edition of Wikipedia
- Naxos discography
