= Jie Chen (pianist) =

Chinese pianist

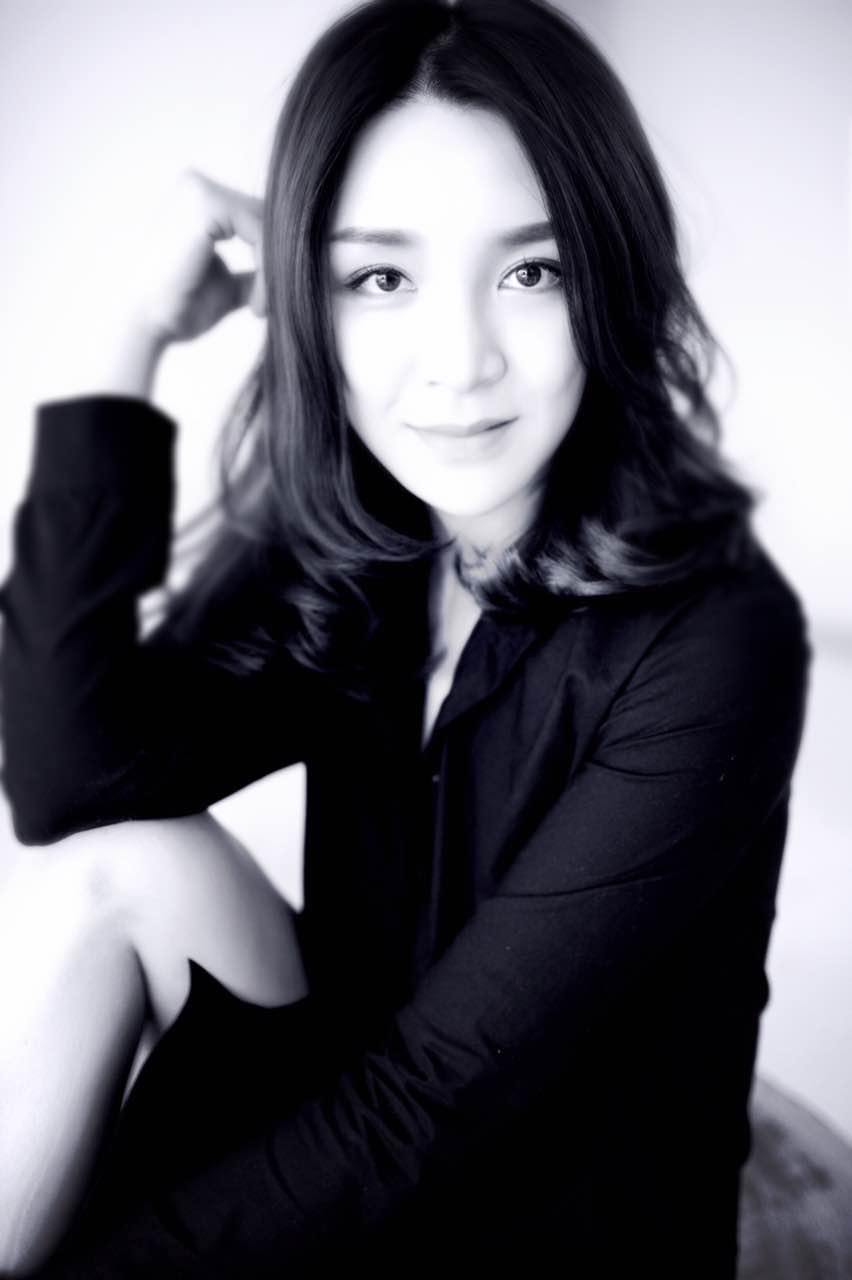
Jie Chen (pianist)

Jie Chen (simplified Chinese: 陈洁; traditional Chinese: 陳潔; pinyin: Chén Jié, born 1985) is a Chinese pianist.

== Career ==
Chen studied at the Shanghai Conservatory of Music and the Curtis Institute of Music.

Chen debuted with the Philadelphia Orchestra at age 16, and has performed at concerts around the world, including performances at Carnegie Hall and Lincoln Center's Alice Tully Hall.

Chen has won a number of prizes, including winning fourth place at the 11th Arthur Rubinstein International Piano Master Competition.

== Awards ==
- "Top 30 under 30" awarded by the KDFC Radio Los Angeles
- "Ambassador for Arts and Education" awarded by the Shanghai International Arts Festival
- "Top 10 Pianist in China" and "Culture Leader" by City of Shanghai
