= Huang Yijun =

Chinese conductor and composer

- 黄贻钧
- Born: May 4, 1915; Suzhou, China
- Died: October 11, 1995 (aged 80)
- Other name: 元之 (Yuán Zhī)
- Occupations: Conductor, composer
- Known for: Head of the Shanghai Symphony Orchestra (1953)

Huang Yijun (simplified Chinese: 黄贻钧; traditional Chinese: 黄貽鈞; 4 May 1915 – 11 October 1995; pen name: 元之; pinyin: Yuán Zhī) was a Chinese conductor and composer.

Born in Suzhou into a musical family, Huang exhibited great musical talent from a young age. His father, a strict man, taught him organ and violin, and Huang taught himself a variety of Chinese and Western instruments, including piano, harmonica, erhu, yangqin, jinghu, yueqin and even Beijing and Kun Opera.

He moved to Shanghai in the mid-1930s, where he joined in orchestral recordings for the Pathé label. In 1938, he joined the Shanghai Symphony Orchestra, and after the founding of the People's Republic of China, became the head of the orchestra in 1953. He recorded a number of film-scores, and accepted invitations to conduct symphonies in Finland (1956), the USSR (1958) and, at the invitation of Herbert Von Karajan in 1981 Berlin. He was persecuted and removed from his position in the Cultural Revolution.

== See also ==
- Mario Paci
