= Qigang Chen =

Chinese-French composer (born 1951)

Qigang Chen ([tʂʰə̌n t͡ɕʰǐ.kɑ́ŋ]; Chinese: 陈其钢; pinyin: Chén Qígāng; born 8 August 1951) is a Chinese-born French composer who has lived in France since 1984 and obtained French citizenship in 1992.

== Biography ==
Coming from an intellectual family, Qigang Chen was born in Shanghai and began his musical studies as a child. In his early teens, he was confronted with the Cultural Revolution and would spend three years locked up in a barracks, undergoing an "ideological reeducation". Nonetheless, his passion for music remained unshakeable and, in spite of the social pressure and anti-cultural policy, he pursued his training in composition.

In 1977, Chen was one of 26 candidates out of 2,000 to be accepted into the composition class at the Beijing Central Conservatory. After five years of studies with Luo Zhongrong, in 1983 he stood for the national competition where he came first. As a result, he was the only one in his field to be authorized to go abroad to pursue graduate studies in composition.

He was Olivier Messiaen's last student and lived with him as well, from 1984 to 1988. His first five years in France allowed him to broaden the scope of his culture and acquire new knowledge about 20th century music.

== Reception ==
Chen is one of the most performed living composers around the world, winning him many accolades. In 2001, his orchestral work Wu Xing was selected from over 1000 entries as one of the five finalists of the Masterprize Award, hosted by the BBC. In 2003, EMI/Virgin Classics released an album devoted to his music, including the highly acclaimed work Iris devoilée. It was later voted by Gramophone magazine as one of the Top Ten Classical Recordings of the Month. In 2005, he was awarded the Grand Prix de la Musique Symphonique by SACEM in recognition of his career achievement. He worked as Music Director of the Opening Ceremony of the 2008 Olympic Games in Beijing. Most recently, in 2013, he was decorated with Chevalier de l'Ordre des arts et des lettres by the French government.

In 2015, he launched a composition workshop at Gonggen College in China, as a platform for dialogues with, and between, young musicians.

== List of works ==
=== Chamber ===
- Le Souvenir (1985) for flute and harp
- San Xiao (1995) for bamboo flute, san xian, zheng, and pipa
- Extase II (1997) for oboe and instrumental ensemble
- L'Éloignement (2003) for string orchestra
- Instants d'un opéra de Pékin (version from 2004) for piano solo
- Extase III (2010, arrangement of EXTASE) for oboe and traditional Chinese instrumental ensemble
- Voyage d'un rêve (new version from 2017) for flute, harp, percussion, and string trio
- La clarinette enchantée (2017) for flute, oboe, clarinet, basson, and French horn

=== Concerti ===
- Feu d'ombres (1990-1991) for soprano saxophone and small wind ensemble
- Extase (1995) for oboe and orchestra
- Reflet d'un temps disparu (1995-1996) for cello and orchestra
- La Nuit profonde (2001) for jinghu/jing erhu and orchestra
- Un Temps disparu (2002) for erhu and orchestra
- Er Huang (2009) for piano and orchestra
- Extase IV (2011, arrangement of Extase) for oboe and Chinese traditional orchestra
- Reflet d'un temps disparu II (2011, arrangement of Reflet d'un temps disparu) for cello and traditional Chinese orchestra
- Un Temps disparu II (2012) for viola and orchestra
- Joie eternelle (2013) for trumpet in C and orchestra
- La Joie de la souffrance (2017) for violin and orchestra

=== Vocal music ===
- Poème lyrique II (1990) for baritone and instrumental ensemble
- Invisible Voices (2005) for 6 mixed voices and large orchestra
- Jiang Tcheng Tse (2017) for solo voice, chorus, and orchestra

=== Orchestra ===
- Wu Xing (The Five Elements) (1998-1999) for symphony orchestra
- Iris dévoilée (Iris Unveiled, 2001) for large orchestra, three female voices, pipa, erhu and banhu, and zheng
- Enchantements oubliés (2004) for large string orchestra, harp, piano, celesta, and percussion
- Ouverture symphonique: "Instants d'un opéra de Pékin" (2014) for symphony orchestra
- Luan Tan (2010–2015) for orchestra
- Itinéraire d'une illusion (2017) for symphony orchestra

=== Electro-acoustic ===
- Rêve d'un solitaire (1992–1993) for instrumental ensemble or orchestra and electronics

=== Music for ballet ===
- Raise the Red Lantern (Épouses et concubines) (2000)

=== Songs ===
- You and Me (2008); theme song of 29th Olympic games in Beijing 2008
- Theme song of film Under the Hawthorn Tree (2010) for male voice
- Mother and childhood (2011) for male voice
- Invisible Forbidden City (2011) for male voice
- To meet again, in days gone by (2014) for male and female voice; theme song 2 for promotion of film "Coming Home"
- Following in your footsteps, till the end of the world (2014) for male voice; theme song 1 for promotion of film "Coming Home"
- Dream (2014) for female voice; theme song for subject-live performance at Dragon Tiger Mountain, Jiangxi

=== Music for open air project ===
- Music for the Opening Ceremony of the 29th Olympic Games (2008)
1. Scroll Painting
2. Ritual Music
3. You and Me

=== Music for film ===
- "Under the Hawthorn Tree" (2010)
- "Flowers of War" (2011)
- "Coming Home" (2014)

== Publishers ==
- Gérard Billaudot (Paris, from 1985 to 2007)
- Boosey & Hawkes (London, since 2008)
- Durand (for La Nuit profonde & Raise the Red Lantern)

== General references ==
- BBC NOW/Zhang review – hypnotic, seductive stuff: Qigang Chen's beguiling score was conducted with love and care by Xian Zhang, who also brought grand passion to Rachmaninov's second symphony (Royal Albert Hall, London)
- Proms 2015: Prom 15, Prokofiev, Qigang Chen & Rachmaninov, review: 'beguiling'
- Prom, 15, review: Qigang Chen's Iris devoilee shows an interesting way forward
- Prom 2: A tentative orchestra but a dazzling soloist
- BBC Proms: China Philharmonic, review: a triumph of programming. The visit from the China Philharmonic to the Proms was full of shrewd choices says Ivan Hewett
- Prom 2: China Philharmonic Orchestra/Yu review – a bit too cool
- Memories of son inspire composer Chen Qigang to escape his creative abyss
- Konzert West-östliche Klangspiele: Long Yu dirigiert die Münchner Philharmoniker
- München/Die Münchner Philharmoniker – Qigang Chen – Gustav Mahler http://der-neue-merker.eu/muenchendie-muenchner-philharmoniker-qigang-chen-gustav-mahler
- The China NCPA Orchestra is (mostly) brilliant at Koerner Hall in Toronto https://nationalpost.com/entertainment/music/the-china-ncpa-orchestra-is-mostly-brilliant-at-koerner-hall-in-toronto
- Beijing orchestra makes impressive showing in Chicago debut
- China's National Centre for the Performing Arts Orchestra is four years old and on tour
- Qigang Chen: Works
