= Guangzhou Symphony Orchestra =

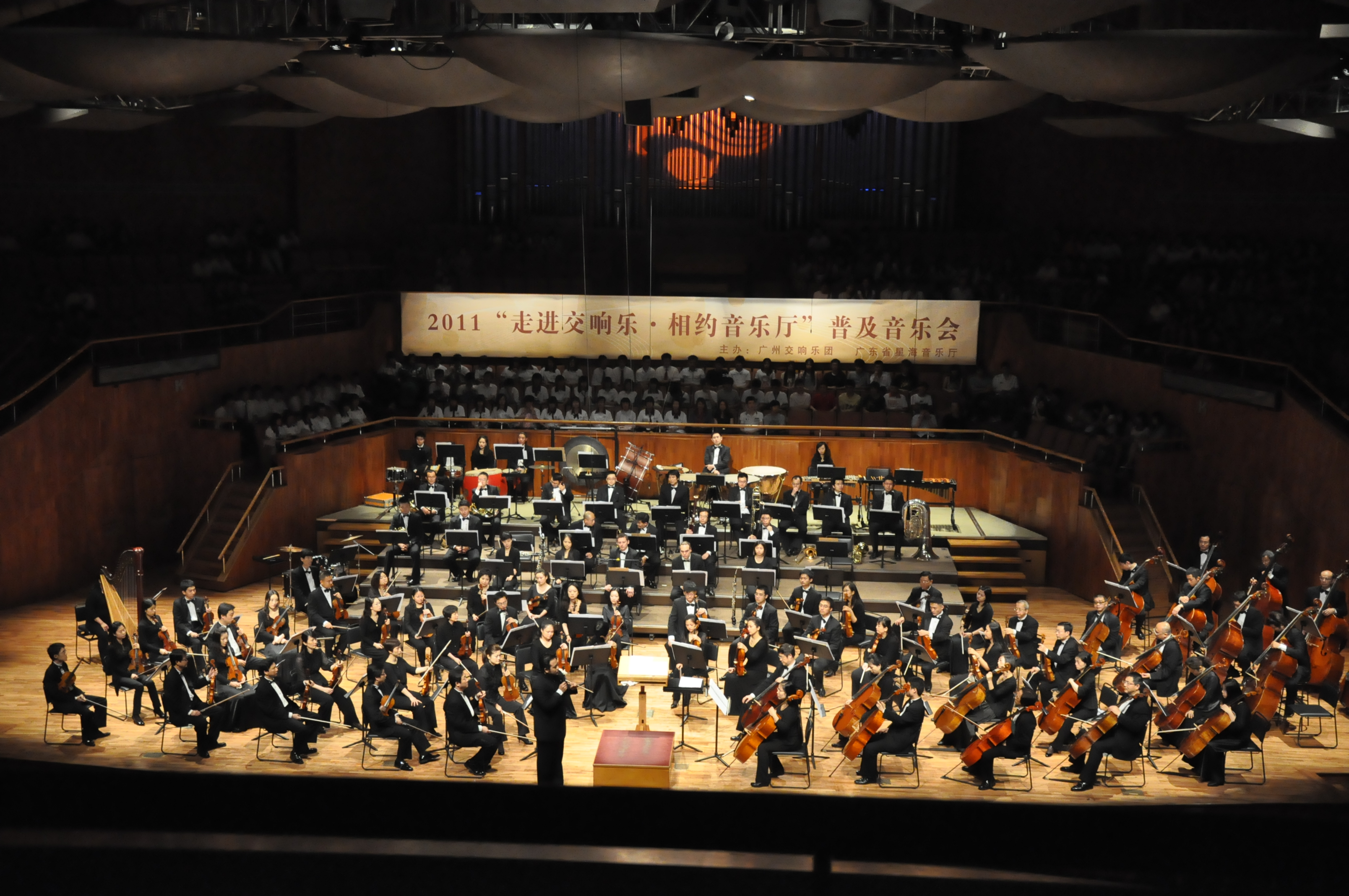
The Guangzhou Orchestra in Xinghai Concert Hall

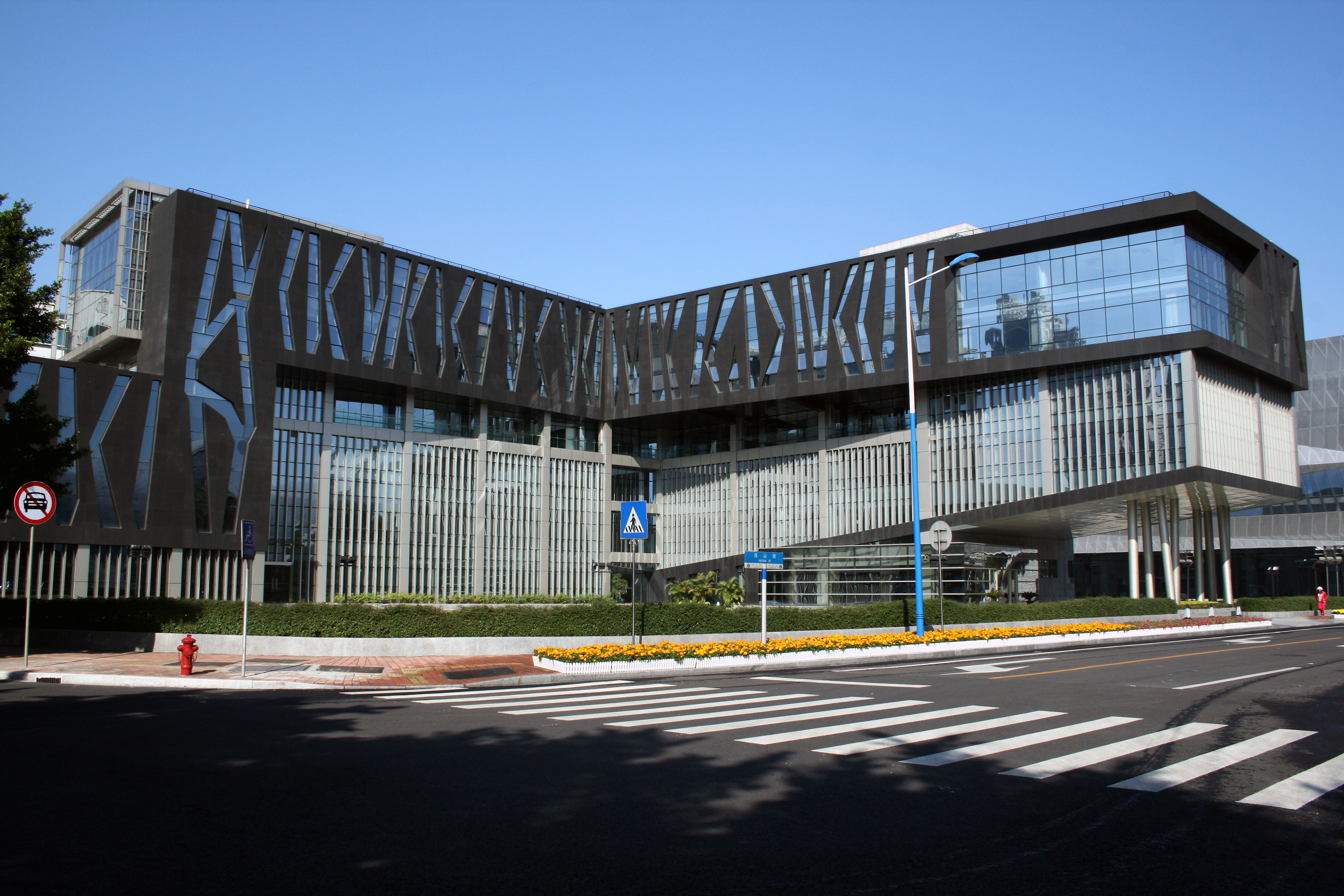
The GSO building

The Guangzhou Symphony Orchestra (GSO; Chinese: 广州交响乐团) is an orchestra based in Guangzhou, Guangdong. It was founded in 1957.

The orchestra's current artistic director is Long Yu (余隆). It is the only Chinese symphony orchestra that has toured five continents.

Greg Patillo, famous beatboxing flutist, was the acting principal flute of the orchestra at one time.

== Guangzhou Symphony Youth Orchestra ==
In July, 2011, Guangzhou Symphony Orchestra founded its affiliated youth orchestra, Guangzhou Symphony Youth Orchestra, with Huan Jing (景焕) as its artistic director.

== See also ==
- Chinese music
