= Yu Long =

Chinese conductor

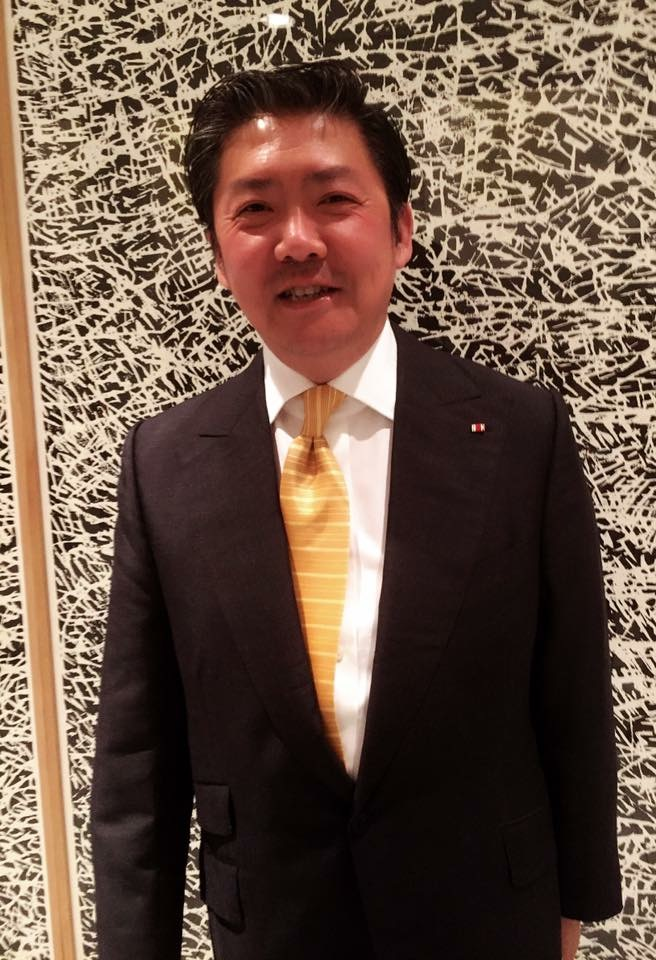
- Maestro Long Yu following the Order of Merit of the Federal Republic of Germany award ceremony in 2016

Background information
- Born: July 1, 1964 (age 61) Shanghai, China
- Genres: Classical
- Occupation(s): Musician, conductor
- Years active: 1990s–present

Yu Long (Chinese: 余隆; pinyin: Yú Lóng; born July 1, 1964) is a Chinese conductor. He is currently artistic director and chief conductor of the China Philharmonic and of the Shanghai Symphony Orchestra, music director of the Guangzhou Symphony Orchestra, and principal guest conductor of the Hong Kong Philharmonic Orchestra. Yu is also the Chairman of the Artistic Committee of the Beijing Music Festival and co-director of the Music in the Summer Air Festival (MISA).

== Biography ==
The son of a pianist mother Ding Jiannuo and a choreographer father Yu Lixun Yu was born into a family of musicians in Shanghai, China and grew up during the Cultural Revolution. Yu received his early childhood music education beginning with piano studies from his grandfather, the composer Ding Shande. He continued his piano studies at the Shanghai Conservatory of Music, and also began conducting studies, graduating from the conservatory in 1987. He further studied music in Europe at the Berlin University of the Arts.

After returning from Europe, Yu was appointed principal conductor of the Central Opera Theatre in Beijing in 1992, serving for three years. He produced operas for the Urban Council of Hong Kong for five years. He was a founder of the Beijing Music Festival (BMF) in 1998, becoming its first artistic director.

In 2000, the Chinese government invited Yu to assume leadership of the China Broadcasting Symphony (also called the China National Symphony). Yu held open auditions, becoming the first Chinese orchestra to recruit all its performers this way. The symphony was renamed the China Philharmonic Orchestra. In 2008, Yu and the China Philharmonic performed for Pope Benedict XVI at the Vatican, as part of increased diplomatic initiative between China and the Vatican. In July 2014, the China Philharmonic was the first Chinese orchestra to perform at the BBC Proms.

In 2003, the Guangzhou Symphony Orchestra appointed Yu its music director. In 2009, the Shanghai Symphony Orchestra appointed Yu its music director. During his tenure, the orchestra has begun its Music in the Summer Air Festival (MISA) in August 2010, constructed a new home for the orchestra (the Shanghai Symphony Hall) in 2014, established the Shanghai Orchestra Academy in 2014, and begun the Shanghai Isaac Stern International Violin Competition in 2016. Yu has shared the position of Artistic Co-Director of the Music In the Summer Air Festival (MISA) with Charles Dutoit since the festival's launch in 2010. In January 2015, Yu was named principal guest conductor of the Hong Kong Philharmonic Orchestra, the first appointment of a mainland Chinese conductor to the position.

In June 2018, Deutsche Grammophon announced an exclusive recording deal with Yu and Shanghai Symphony Orchestra (SSO).

== Select discography ==
Year	Album	Label
1996	The Hall of Fame with the Slovak Radio Symphony Orchestra	Marco Polo
1997	Korngold / Goldmark: Violin Concertos with Vera Tsu and the Razumovsky Symphony Orchestra	Naxos
1997	Greatest Movie Classics with the Razumovsky Symphony Orchestra	Marco Polo
1998	The Centre, Vol. 2	Naxos
1999	Discover the Classics, Vol. 3: The Concerto	Naxos Educational
2000	Classics at the Movies: Drama	Naxos
2003	Love and Peace	Naxos
2004	Ding Shande: Long March Symphony with the Slovak Radio Symphony Orchestra	Marco Polo
2006	Dragon Songs with Lang Lang and the China Philharmonic Orchestra	Deutsche Grammophon
2008	Tchaikovsky: Romeo & Juliet; Strauss: Don Quixote with the China Philharmonic Orchestra	Decca
2009	The Very Best of Cinema Classics	Naxos
2012	Bao Yuankai: Five Orchestral Pieces; Lu Qiming: Ode to the Red Flag; Liu Tingyu: Susan Suite with the China Philharmonic Orchestra	Deutsche Grammophon
2013	Klassik Ohne Krise: Ganz grosses Kino	Naxos
2015	Epics of Love with Song Zuying and the China Philharmonic Orchestra	Stockfisch Records
2019	Gateways with Maxim Vengerov and the Shanghai Symphony Orchestra (works by Chen Qigang, Fritz Kreisler, Rachmaninov)	Deutsche Grammophon
2021	The Song of the Earth with the Shanghai Symphony Orchestra, Michelle DeYoung, Brian Jagde, and Zhang Liping (works by Gustav Mahler and Ye Xiaogang)	Deutsche Grammophon

== Honors and awards ==
- 2002: Arts Patronage Award of the Montblanc Cultural Foundation
- 2003: Chevalier dans L’Ordre des Arts et des Lettres, France
- 2005: L'onorificenza di commendatore, Italy
- December 2014: Chevalier de la Légion d’Honneur, France
- October 2015: Atlantic Council Global Citizen Award
- April 2016: Foreign Honorary Member of the American Academy of Arts & Sciences
- June 2016: Order of Merit of the Federal Republic of Germany

Cultural offices
Preceded by Chen Zuohuang (China Broadcasting Symphony)	Artistic Director, China Philharmonic Orchestra; 2000–present	Succeeded by incumbent
Preceded by Chen Xieyang	Music Director, Shanghai Symphony Orchestra; 2009–present	Succeeded by incumbent
Preceded by Yip Wing-sie	Music Director, Guangzhou Symphony Orchestra; 2003–present	Succeeded by incumbent
