= Shanghai Symphony Orchestra =

Chinese symphony orchestra

- Orchestra
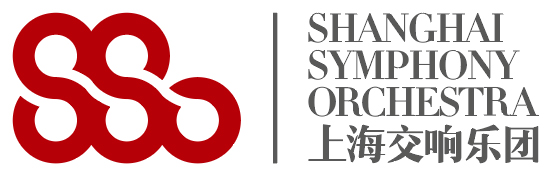
- Native name: 上海交响乐团
- Short name: SSO
- Founded: 1919
- Location: Shanghai, China
- Concert hall: Shanghai Symphony Hall
- Music director: Long Yu
- Website: Official website

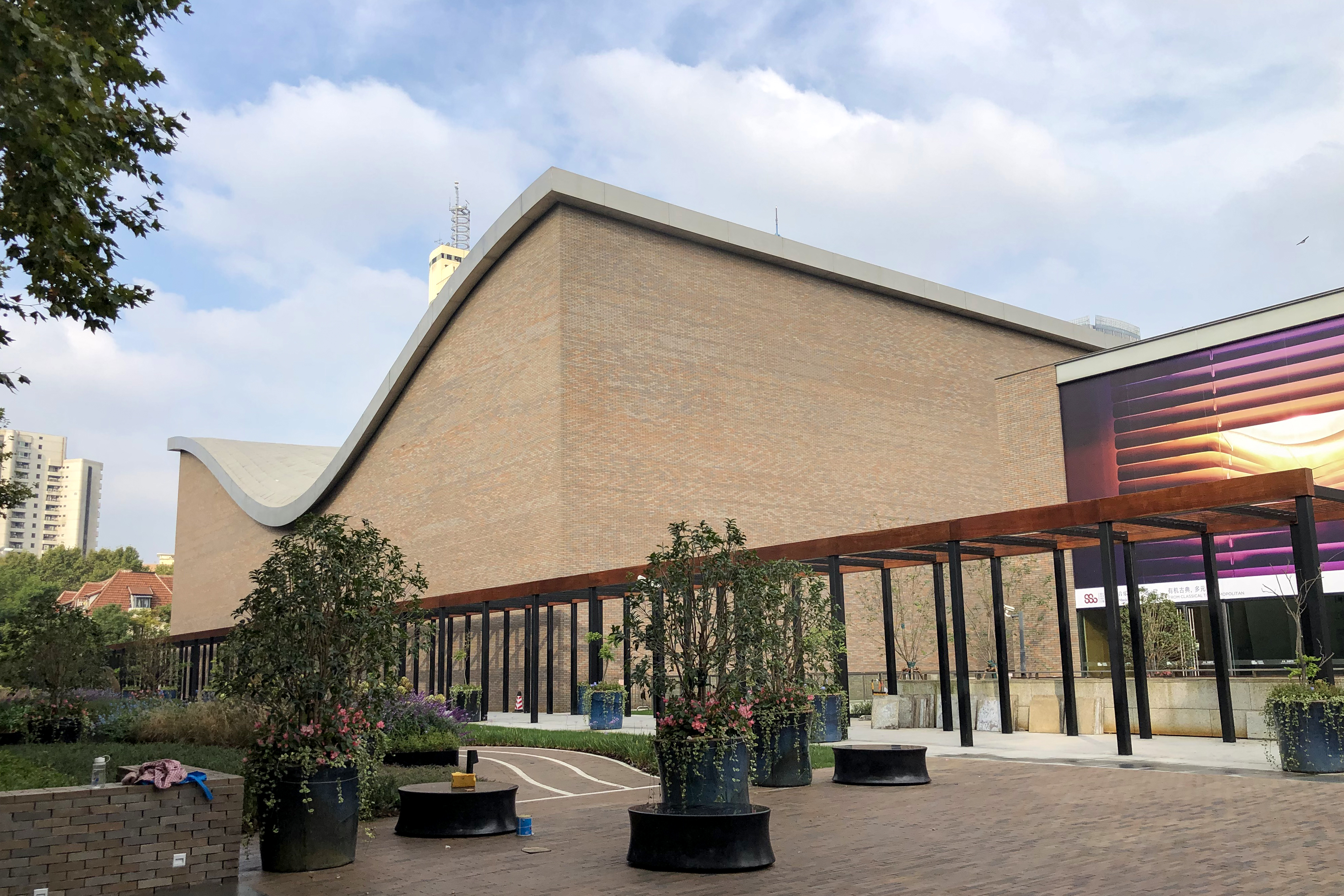
Shanghai Symphony Hall designed by Arata Isozaki

The Shanghai Symphony Orchestra (Chinese: 上海交响乐团; pinyin: Shànghǎi Jiāoxiǎng Yuètuán) is a symphony orchestra in Shanghai, China. Its music director is Long Yu. The SSO was known as the Shanghai Public Band, expanding in 1907 to an orchestra. In 1922, it was renamed as the Shanghai Municipal Council Symphony Orchestra.

== History ==
1879
Shanghai Symphony Orchestra's predecessor was established known as the Shanghai Public Band. French flautist Jean Rémusat was appointed as conductor. At the time he was deemed "the best European flautist and the chief flute soloist of the theaters in Paris and London" by the Shanghai-based North-China Herald. Musicians were all Filipinos and audiences were Europeans from the concessions.

1907
German conductor Rudolf Buck succeeded as conductor. He brought eight musicians from Germany and Austria as chiefs of different sections. Authentic orchestral music performances began and its regulations became standardized, with regular summer and winter concert seasons established including the European coupon concert and stroll concert. The music played became more diverse; however, there were only 39 people in the band so songs performed were somewhat brief.

1919
After Buck's expulsion from China, Mario Paci, an Italian pianist, took over command. He reconstructed the band in accordance with the urban European orchestras. He went to Europe for recruitment of Italian musicians, including Arrigo Foa, who was a graduate of Milan Conservatory and became vice conductor later. Paci led the orchestra for a splendid 23 years, building it into "the best in the Far East".

1922
The band was renamed as Shanghai Municipal Council Symphony Orchestra. During the next 23 years of "Paci Era", the Orchestra played more different kind of music and had cooperation with famous musician from Europe and around the world.

1923
It was the first time that Chinese people appeared in the concert of the orchestra. Although the orchestra mainly served for foreigners from the concessions, Paci cared a lot about cultivating Chinese audiences and music talents. 5 years later, the summer open-air concerts were open to Chinese audiences for the first time. Later on, Chinese viewers made up 24% of the audience.

1942
The Japanese took over the orchestra and renamed it Shanghai Philharmonic Orchestra. Foa succeeded as conductor in May. During this special period, musical activities not only avoided suppression, but became more active than ever before. When World War II ended, it was taken over by the National Government and its name changed to Shanghai Municipal Orchestra. The European musicians left one after another, which provided Chinese musicians with opportunities. A time was evolving for Chinese people to master the orchestra and the music life of China.

1919–1948
"Greatest Orchestra in the Far East".

1956
The Orchestra formally was known as the Shanghai Symphony Orchestra.

October 1950
Yijun Huang appeared as a conductor on the symphony stage.

December 1984
Conductor Xieyang Chen became the band leader. Under the leadership of Xieyang Chen, the orchestra embarked on large-scale reform. He established the SSO concert season, set up the institution of musical director, introduced a system of employment contracts, and founded China Symphony Development Foundation and Shanghai Symphony Lovers Society. He also initiated a global tour, bringing the orchestra to the global stage.

1986
The orchestra implemented the music director system. Xieyang Chen became the first director. Long Yu currently is the director.

5 April 2014
The SSO changed their logo. The new symbol of the Shanghai Symphony Orchestra originated from the relationship between music and human. The main body of the symbol is circular and represents harmonious and the spread of the sound. In the basic circular form, the use of cut-ins of the notes integrates these two elements. These open circles represent the Shanghai style. Circles buckle and form two letters S and an O. They form an "SSO", which salutes the prior edition of the Shanghai Symphony Orchestra logo. In large, the whole logo is a combination of people, just like the band combination, which embodies the symphony as a whole formed by individuals. At the same time, it reflects the overall harmony and unity. The new logo also has a sense of the waves, which has association of river and water. Nonetheless, this is the first characteristic of Shanghai, a metropolis of the west coast of the Pacific.

== Major performances ==
The orchestra has participated in the China Art Festival, China Shanghai International Arts Festival, Shanghai Spring International Music Festival, Beijing International Music Festival, Hong Kong Art Festival, Macao International Music Festival, North Korea "April Spring" festival, and so on. It won numerous awards. It played at the Shanghai Asia-Pacific Economic Cooperation (APEC) meeting.

14 October 1990
The orchestra held a special concert to celebrate the 100th anniversary at Carnegie Hall in New York. The US invited the orchestra to play. A hundred years ago, the first concert in Carnegie Hall was conducted by Tchaikovsky. A hundred years later, a symphony orchestra composed exclusively of Chinese musicians stepped on the stage for the first time and won acclaim from the 2300 audience members present. The next day SSO was deemed as "a world-class orchestra" by the New York Daily News.

20 June 2004
SSO held a concert for celebrating the 125 anniversary in the Berliner Philharmonie concert hall. (It became the first Chinese orchestra perform in the Berlin Philharmonic Hall).

2010
SSO went to New York as the only Chinese symphony orchestra invited to give a concert in Central Park. The concert was in honor of Shanghai's Expo 2010 and the opening of a yearly series of symphonic concerts in Central Park.

September 2003
SSO held tour in eleven American cities.

2004
SSO had tour of Europe "Sino French culture year".

2012–2013
There were 55 artists "lined up" to cooperate with international orchestras. The "Beethoven World Records" series caught people's eyes.

September 2014
The Concert Hall of SSO will open to the public, bringing the orchestra to a new running model. It not only marks the realization of its dream crossing three centuries, but also represents an important step toward being a top orchestra in the world.

2020
SSO performed the Liyue soundtrack for the video game Genshin Impact.

2025
SSO performed the soundtrack for the video game Girls' Frontline for the game's 10th anniversary concert at the Jaguar Shanghai Symphony Hall, conducted by resident conductor Sun Yifan, with vocals by Huang Yuxin (Note: Stage name Kinoko) and the Echo Festival Choir.

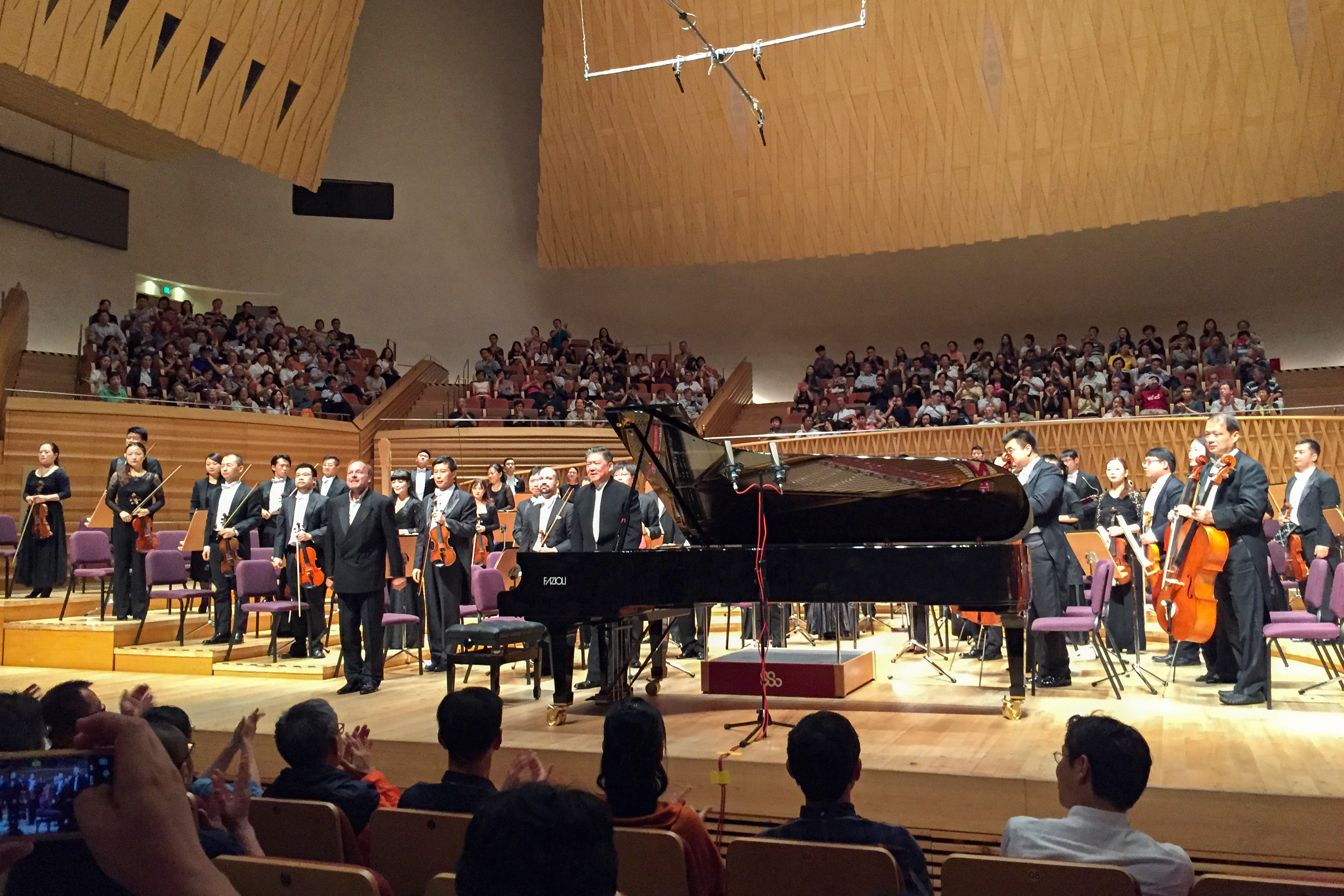
Long Yu at the opening concert of SSO 2017/2018 season

== Long Yu ==
Long Yu is currently the conductor and musical director of the Shanghai Symphony Orchestra, the artistic director and principal conductor of China Philharmonic Orchestra, and the music director of the Guangzhou Symphony Orchestra, sharing his time between the three. He is also the chairman of the Beijing International Music Festival Arts Council, and the art committee of the Shanghai Oriental Art Center. Jindong Cai of Stanford University said of Yu that he has "done a lot for the development of [European] classical music in China".
