= China Philharmonic Orchestra =

Chinese orchestra

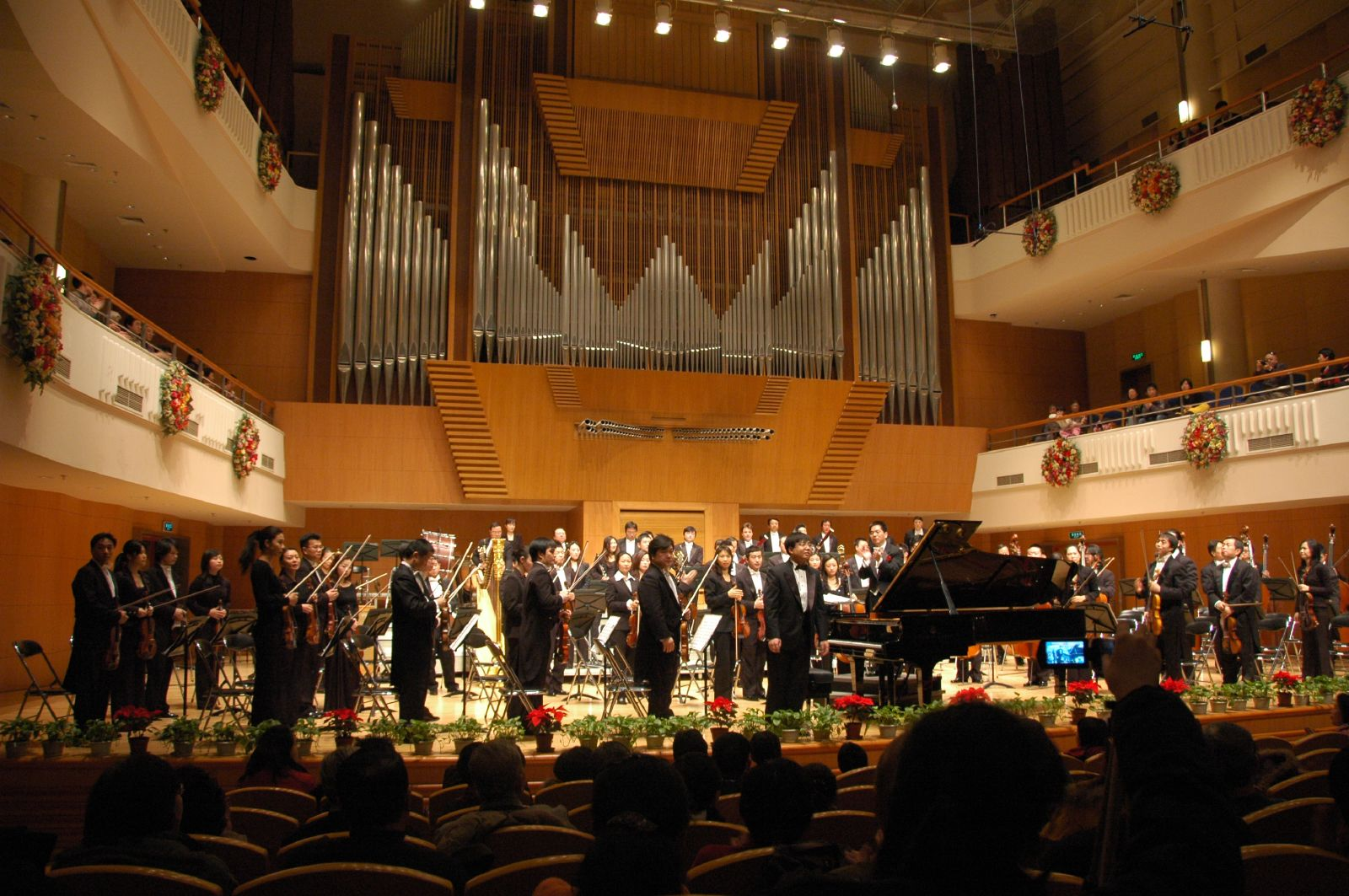
The China Philharmonic Orchestra performing at the Beijing Concert Hall

The China Philharmonic Orchestra (Chinese: 中国爱乐乐团; pinyin: Zhōngguó Àiyuè Yuètuán; abbreviated CPO) is an orchestra founded in Beijing, China, on May 25, 2000, based on the previous China Broadcasting Symphony Orchestra. It is a division of the State Administration of Radio, Film, and Television (SARFT) of the People's Republic of China.

Its inaugural concert was held on December 16, 2000, conducted by artistic director Long Yu. Their first season included the world premiere of Philip Glass' Cello Concerto No. 1 performed by Julian Lloyd Webber, and the symphonic Beijing opera Women Generals of the Yangs by Du Mingxin, their first commissioned symphonic work.

The CPO has gone on several world tours, performing in some of the top classical music venues in the United States. It has also performed in Taiwan in 2001, as well as other countries, such as Japan and Korea in 2002. Its most lengthy overseas tour was in 2005, visiting and performing in 25 cities in seven European countries and in North America.

The CPO recorded the musical score for the Indonesian film Heart, conducted by Indonesian composer and conductor Aksan Sjuman, at Oasis Studio in Beijing, China. It also recorded the score for the 2002 film Hero.

The CPO made its debut at The Proms on July 19, 2014, playing works by Elgar, Tchaikovsky, Liszt, Qigang Chen (Joie Éternelle) and Mussorgsky.

== See also ==
- List of Symphony Orchestras in China
