= Princess Jieyou (TV series) =

- Promotional image
- Traditional Chinese: 解憂公主
- Simplified Chinese: 解忧公主
- Hanyu Pinyin: Jiěyōu gōngzhǔ
- Genre: Historical, romantic comedy
- Written by: Xu Yiliang; Yu Yang; Sun Hao; Xue Qiao
- Directed by: Lu Yang
- Starring: Zhang Xinyi; Yuan Hong; Yuan Wenkang; Zhang Yiluan; Ye Qing
- Opening theme: Bi'anhua by He Jie and Su Xing
- Ending theme: Polar Light by Bii; Pengcheng by Han Lei and Chen Qianqian
- Country of origin: China
- Original language: Mandarin
- No. of seasons: 1
- No. of episodes: 45

Production
- Executive producer: Zhang Ning
- Production locations: Beijing, Zhejiang, Anhui, Inner Mongolia
- Production companies: Central New Film Group; Shenzhen Media Group

Original release
- Network: CCTV-8
- Release: February 18 – February 28, 2016

Princess Jieyou (Chinese: 解忧公主) is a 2016 Chinese historical television series, based on the story of Princess Jieyou of the Han dynasty. It is directed by Lu Yang, written by Xu Yiliang, Yu Yang, Sun Hao and Xue Qiao, and stars Zhang Xinyi, Yuan Hong, Yuan Wenkang, Zhang Yiluan, and Ye Qing. The series aired on CCTV-8 from 18 February to 28 February 2016.

== Synopsis ==
In the period of Emperor Wu of Han (141 BC-87 BC), the Han Empire is being invaded by the Xiongnu empire. In order to defeat the Xiongnu, Emperor Wu dispatches Princess Jieyou to the Wusun kingdom to marry the King Weng Kunmi, then the two empires form an alliance against the Xiongnu.

== Cast ==
=== Main ===
- Zhang Xinyi as Liu Jieyou or Princess Jieyou, a princess sent to marry the leader of the Wusun kingdom as part of the Western Han (206 BC-9 AD) Chinese policy of heqin.
- Yuan Hong as Weng Gui, a royal in the Wusun kingdom, brother of King Kunmi, after the death of Kunmi, he secures the position of King.
- Yuan Wenkang as Kunmi, King of Wusun kingdom.
- Zhang Yiluan as Hu Gu, the first beauty of the Huns, Jun Xumi's wife.
- Ye Qing as Feng Liao, a businesswoman of the Western Han dynasty, she loves Huai Tiansha.

=== Supporting ===
- Liu Guanxiang as Huai Tiansha, the envoy of the Western Han dynasty. He dies in the war between the Han and the Xiongnu.
- Yang Yi as A Cai, an actress in the theatrical troupe. She is burned to death due to save the Princess Liu Jieyou.
- Qu Shuangshuang as Yun Gute, Jun Xumi's wife.
- Wu Qiang as Changshan Yihou, a Xiongnu people and marquis in the Wusun kingdom.
- Wang Zixuan as Princess Jingjun, Liu Jieyou's younger female cousin.
- Lu Qiwei as A Yi'na, Changshan Xihou's younger sister. She loves Weng Gui.
- Yu Bo as Emperor Wu of Han, the seventh emperor of the Han dynasty.

== Production ==
The producers hired Lu Yang (Brotherhood of Blades), a Golden Rooster Award winner, to serve as its director.

On August 5, 2014, the producers held a press conference in Beijing, the producers released a trailer and the official posters.

Production started on August 5, 2014, and ended on October 31, 2014. Most of the TV series was made on locations in Beijing, Zhejiang, Anhui, and Inner Mongolia.

== Soundtrack ==
No.	Title	Lyrics	Music	Singers	Length
1.	"Bi'anhua by (彼岸花)" (Opening theme)	Duan Sisi	Tan Xuan	He Jie and Su Xing
2.	"Polar Light (极光)" (Ending theme)	Duan Sisi	Chen Sitong and Tan Xuan	Bii
3.	"Pengcheng (彭城)" (Ending theme)	Li Zhaorun	Zhang Zhao	Han Lei and Chen Qianqian

== Ratings ==
- Highest ratings are marked in red, lowest ratings are marked in blue

Date	CCTV-8 GSM52 city ratings			
Date	Episode #	Ratings (%)	Ratings share (%)	Rank
2016.2.18	1-2	0.617	2.379	9
2016.2.19	3-6	0.597	1.742	10
2016.2.20	7-10	0.632	1.91	11
2016.2.21	11-14	0.672	2.037	9
2016.2.22	15-18	0.652	1.92	8
2016.2.23	19-22	0.787	2.521	7
2016.2.24	23-26	0.822	2.667	5
2016.2.25	27-30	0.85	2.761	6
2016.2.26	31-34	0.881	2.598	5
2016.2.27	35-38	0.959	2.919	5
2016.2.28	39-42	1.015	3.171	3

== International broadcast ==
Channel	Location	Broadcast start date	Note
CCTV-8	Mainland China	February 18, 2016	
Astro Quan Jia HD	Malaysia	November 9, 2016	Monday to Thursday 20:30-21:30
Longhua Television	Taiwan	October 17, 2017	Monday to Friday 21:00－23:00
