= Yuan Wenkang =

Chinese actor (born 1980)

- 袁文康
- Born: July 23, 1980 (age 46); Shanghai, China
- Other name: Mickey Yuan
- Education: Shanghai Theatre Academy
- Occupation: Actor
- Years active: 1999–present
- Notable work: Assembly

Mickey Yuan Wenkang (Chinese: 袁文康; pinyin: Yuán Wénkāng; born 23 July 1980) is a Chinese actor. He first garnered recognition for his acting in 2007, when his performance in Assembly and earned him a Best Newcomer nomination at the 29th Hundred Flowers Awards.

== Early life ==
On July 23, 1985, Yuan was born in Shanghai, China.

== Education ==
Yuan graduated from Shanghai Theatre Academy.

== Career ==
Yuan first came to public attention in 1999 at the age of 19, appearing on Miss News. His first main role in a television drama came with the Stories of Youth.

In 2003, Yuan had a minor role in the wuxia television series Legend of Dagger Li, which starred Vincent Chiao as Li Xunhuan.

Yuan rose to fame after portraying Wang Jincun in Assembly (2007), for which he was nominated for the Best Newcomer at the 29th Hundred Flowers Awards and received Most Popular Actor nomination at the 15th Beijing College Student Film Festival.

In 2008, Yuan starred alongside Chen Zihan in the romantic television series Love Strategy.

Yuan had a small role in Florian Gallenberger's John Rabe, a 2009 German-Chinese-French biopictorial film starring Ulrich Tukur, Daniel Brühl and Steve Buscemi.

In 2010, Yuan was cast in the film The Double Life, playing the former husband of Zhang Jingchu's character. He appeared as Feng Baohua, the company commander of the 57th Division of the National Revolutionary Army, in the war film Death and Glory in Changde. That same year, he amassed a number of television credits namely romance comedy series Down with Love, shenmo television series Ghost Catcher: Legend of Beauty Zhongkui, and historical romance series The Legend of Daiyu.

In 2011, Yuan starred in the historical comedy series The Four Brothers of Peking. It is a remake of the 2004 Taiwanese television of the same name.

In 2012, Yuan had a supporting role in the romance film Happiness Me Too. That same year, he also appeared in romance dramas Beijing Love Story and Nos Annees Francaises.

In 2013, Yuan was cast in the lead role of Wan Xiaoda in the Huayi Brothers's production of Tangshan Earthquake.

In 2014, Yuan had a key supporting role in The Golden Era, directed by Ann Hui. The film grossed ¥51.49 million.

Yuan was cast in the historical mystery television series Three Unusual Detectives (2015). He also joined the main cast of historical drama The Imperial Doctress as Yexian, ruler of the Northern Yuan.

In 2016, Yuan played the lead role in the romantic film New York New York. On television in 2016, he played the lead role opposite Zhang Xinyi in the historical romance drama Princess Jieyou, and starred in the spy television series Rookie Agent Rouge.

In 2017, Yuan landed a guest role in wuxia film Brotherhood of Blades II: The Infernal Battlefield and patriotic tribute film The Founding of an Army. He appeared in Wang Jun's palace drama Ruyi's Royal Love in the Palace, based on Wu Xuelan's novel, as Jiang Yubin, an imperial physician in the Qing government. The series was one of the most watched ones in mainland China in when it broadcast in August 2018.

Yuan co-starred with Yao Chen, who portrayed his former wife, in the drama film Lost, Found (2018), which premiered at the 21st Shanghai International Film Festival on 17 June 2018 and was released into theaters on 5 October 2018 by CMC Pictures. He appeared in the film The Wrath of Silence, in which he played a lawyer.

== Filmography ==
=== Film ===
Year	English title	Chinese title	Role	Notes
2007	Assembly	集结号	Wang Jincun	
2008	Fish in Seven Seconds	七秒钟的鱼	Liang Chen	
2009	John Rabe	约翰·拉贝	Xiao Gu	
2009		谍战玫瑰	Zhou Peng	
2010	The Double Life	A面B面	Liang Haichao	
2010	Death and Glory in Changde	喋血孤城	Feng Baohua	
2011	Blue Tears	幸福快递	The bridegroom	
2012	Happiness Me Too	幸福迷途	Liu Feng	
2013		告别囧途	The writer	Short film
2014	The Golden Era	黄金时代	Wang Enjia	
2016	New York New York	纽约纽约		
2017	Brotherhood of Blades II: The Infernal Battlefield	绣春刀II：修罗战场	guest	
2017	The Founding of an Army	建军大业	Staff officer of Chen Feng	
2018	The Wrath of Silence	暴裂无声	Xu Wenjie	
2018	Lost, Found	找到你	Tian Ning	
2019	My People, My Country	我和我的祖国		
2025	Operation Hadal	蛟龙行动	Chen Chang'an	

=== Television series ===
Year	English title	Chinese title	Role	Notes
1999	Miss News	新闻小姐	Ji Xiaoyu	
1999		情牵日月星	Chen Fei	
2001		包公生死劫	Chen Shaochun	
2001		东西奇遇结良缘	Zhuge Xiaohua	
2002	Stories of Youth	青春的童话	Chen Hu	
2003	Legend of Dagger Li	飞刀问情	Long Xiaoyun	
2003		追梦谷	Li Xiaofei	
2005		爱我带我回家	Zhuang Shaowei	
2005	The Magic Touch of Fate	魔术奇缘	Wu Qi'an	
2007		河流如血	Quan Hu	
2008	Love Strategy	恋爱兵法	Wang Wenqing	
2009		九鼎迷踪	Teng Wei	
2009	Memories of the Golden Flame	烽火影人	Regimental Commander Xie	
2010	Down with Love	就想赖着你	Zhao Qing	
2010	Rent a Girlfriend for the New Year	租个女友回家过年	Fu Zuo	
2010	Ghost Catcher: Legend of Beauty Zhongkui	天师钟馗之青蛇有泪	Meng Wenxuan	
2010	The Legend of Daiyu	黛玉传	Qin Zhong	
2011	The Four Brothers of Peking	新京城四少	Tong Yuguan	
2011	China 1921	中国1921	Cai Hesen	
2011	Confucius	孔子春秋	Shao Zhengmao	
2011	The Shengtianmen Gate	圣天门口	Fu Langxi	
2012	Beijing Love Story	北京爱情故事	Andy	
2012	Nos Annees Francaises	我们的法兰西岁月	Zong Xuzhi	
2013	Tangshan Earthquake	唐山大地震	Wan Xiaoda	
2013	Beau-Care Clinic	美人季	Zhou Kang	
2013	Fall in Love	恋爱那点事		Cameo
2014	Three Unusual Detectives	长安三怪探	Li Xiuyi	
2015	Tour Between Two Lovers	向幸福出发	Ji Xugang	
2015	The Merchants of Qing Dynasty	大清盐商	Wang Haikun	
2016	The Imperial Doctress	女医明妃传	Yexian	
2016	Princess Jieyou	解忧公主	Jun Xumi	
2016		穿越谜团	Si Ning	
2016	Plastic Surgery Season	整容季	Zhuo Wei	
2016	Snowy Forest	雪海	Zhongshan Wu	
2016		太太万岁	Lu Fen	
2016	Rookie Agent Rouge	胭脂	Song Mian	
2017	Come Across the Sea to See You	漂洋过海来看你	Krief	
2017		飞哥战队	Liang Fei	
2018	On the Road	梦想合伙人	Wei Wenbin	
2018	Women in Shanghai	上海女子图鉴	Yang Chengyuan	
2018	Ruyi's Royal Love in the Palace	如懿传	Jiang Yubin	
2018	An Oriental Odyssey	盛唐幻夜	Chen Tianshu	
2018	The City of Chaos	悍城	Bai Zhenhe	
2020	Crimson River	夜雨雾		
2020	Get Married Or Not	我不是结不了婚		
2020	The Investigator	商业调查师	Lin Junwen	
2020	Love is True	我是真的爱你	Qi Bin	
2021	The Rebel	叛逆者	Meng Annan	
2021	New Generation: Takeoff	我们的新时代	Pang Yibing	

== Awards ==
Year	Nominated work	Award	Category	Result	Notes
2008	Assembly	29th Hundred Flowers Awards	Best Newcomer	Nominated	
2008	Assembly	15th Beijing College Student Film Festival	Most Popular Actor	Nominated	
