= Shi Runjiu =

Chinese filmmaker

Shi Runjiu (simplified Chinese: 施润玖; traditional Chinese: 施潤玖; pinyin: Shī Rùnjiǔ; born 1969) is a Chinese filmmaker, who is based in Beijing.

After graduating from the directing department of the Beijing Central Drama Academy in 1992, he went on to direct many documentaries and music videos for MTV.

He served as assistant director to Zhang Yimou and Lü Yue on their films To Live and Mr. Zhao, respectively. His first feature was A Beautiful New World (Meili Xin Shijie, 1998), a romantic comedy about a peasant who wins an apartment in Shanghai in a lottery.

Shi works for the Imar Film Company, and is a member of the "Sixth Generation" of Chinese filmmakers.

== Filmography ==
| Year | English Title | Chinese Title | Notes |
|---|---|---|---|
| 1999 | A Beautiful New World | 美丽新世界 | Special Jury Award at the 1999 Hawaii International Film Festival |
| 2001 | All the Way | 走到底 | Official Selection at the 2001 Berlin International Film Festival |
