= 169 BC =

169 BC in various calendars
- Gregorian calendar: 169 BC; CLXIX BC
- Ab urbe condita: 585
- Ancient Egypt era: XXXIII dynasty, 155
- Pharaoh: Ptolemy VI Philometor, 12
- Ancient Greek Olympiad (summer): 152nd Olympiad, year 4
- Assyrian calendar: 4582
- Balinese saka calendar: N/A
- Bengali calendar: −762 – −761
- Berber calendar: 782
- Buddhist calendar: 376
- Burmese calendar: −806
- Byzantine calendar: 5340–5341
- Chinese calendar: 辛未年 (Metal Goat); 2529 or 2322 — to — 壬申年 (Water Monkey); 2530 or 2323
- Coptic calendar: −452 – −451
- Discordian calendar: 998
- Ethiopian calendar: −176 – −175
- Hebrew calendar: 3592–3593
- Hindu calendars
- Vikram Samvat: −112 – −111
- Shaka Samvat: N/A
- Kali Yuga: 2932–2933
- Holocene calendar: 9832
- Iranian calendar: 790 BP – 789 BP
- Islamic calendar: 814 BH – 813 BH
- Javanese calendar: N/A
- Julian calendar: N/A
- Korean calendar: 2165
- Minguo calendar: 2080 before ROC 民前2080年
- Nanakshahi calendar: −1636
- Seleucid era: 143/144 AG
- Thai solar calendar: 374–375
- Tibetan calendar: ལྕགས་མོ་ལུག་ལོ་ (female Iron-Sheep) −42 or −423 or −1195 — to — ཆུ་ཕོ་སྤྲེ་ལོ་ (male Water-Monkey) −41 or −422 or −1194

Year 169 BC was a year of the pre-Julian Roman calendar. At the time it was known as the Year of the Consulship of Philippus and Caepio (or, less frequently, year 585 Ab urbe condita). The denomination 169 BC for this year has been used since the early medieval period, when the Anno Domini calendar era became the prevalent method in Europe for naming years.

== Events ==
=== By place ===
==== Greece ====
- Macedonian forces led by Perseus of Macedon trap a Roman army led by Consul Quintus Marcius Phillipus near Tempe, but the Macedonians fail to take advantage of their resulting superior tactical position.
- King Perseus asks the Seleucid King Antiochus IV to join forces with him against the danger that Rome presents to all of the Hellenic monarchs. Antiochus IV does not respond.

==== Roman Republic ====
- Lex Voconia (The Voconian Law) is introduced in Rome by the tribune, Quintus Voconius Saxa, with the support of Cato the Elder. This law prohibits those who own property valued at 100,000 sesterces from making a woman their heir.

== Births ==
- Liu Fei, Chinese prince of the Han dynasty. He is also the son of Emperor Jing and a half-brother of Emperor Wu (d. 128 BC)

== Deaths ==
- Quintus Ennius, Roman epic poet, dramatist, and satirist, the most influential of the early Latin poets – and often called the founder of Roman literature or the father of Roman poetry. His epic Annales, a poem telling the story of Rome from the wanderings of Aeneas to Ennius' own time, remains the national epic until it is later eclipsed by Virgil's Aeneid.
