= Princess Xijun =

Liu Xijun (Chinese: 劉細君; pinyin: Liú Xìjūn; Wade–Giles: Liu Hsi-chün, 123?–101 BC), also known as Princess Xijun (細君公主), Princess of Jiangdu (Chinese: 江都公主) or the Princess of Wusun (Chinese: 烏孫公主), was a princess of the Han dynasty sent to marry the King of Wusun as marriage alliance. A poem believed to be by her is one of the earliest known Chinese poems attributable to a named woman.

== Life ==
Liu Xijun was the daughter of the King of Jiangdu (in modern-day Yangzhou, Jiangsu), Liu Jian (劉建) and granddaughter of Liu Fei, brother of Emperor Wu of Han. Xijun was orphaned while still an infant. Her father was described as incestuous, cruel and depraved, and had to commit suicide after being implicated in a rebellion. Her mother was also executed the same year for practicing witchcraft. As daughter of disgraced parents, she would likely have a low status at the Han court.

The Han princess Xijun was sent to marry the king of the Wusun

In 105 BC, Xijun's status was elevated and she was made a princess by Emperor Wu. The emperor wanted to send her off to marry the king (Kunmi or Kunmo) of the Wusun, Liejiaomi (猎驕靡), with the intention of forming an alliance with the Wusun and breaking up the confederacy of the Xiongnu. After a gift of 1,000 horses from the Wusun were sent to the Han court, she was sent to the Wusun 5,000 miles away in the Ili valley area with a retinue of 100 officials, eunuchs, servants and carriages. After her marriage, she was made Lady of the Right, a position subordinate to the Lady of the Left who was of Xiongnu origin. However, her husband was elderly, she rarely saw him and could not communicate with him. Shortly before he died, he wanted to divorce her so that his grandson Cenzou (岑陬) could marry her. Although Xijun protested to the Han emperor at the prospect of such remarriage, which was considered improper in Han Chinese custom, the Han emperor replied that she should comply as the alliance with Wusun was deemed necessary to vanquish the Xiongnu. She duly married Cenzou, who became king after Liejiaomi died, and she had a daughter with him in 102 BC. She died the following year. A further princess named Princess Jieyou was sent to marry Cenzou after her death.

Princess Xijun's daughter was sent to the Han court in 64 BC. But when the daughter stopped at Kucha on the way, she decided to marry the king of the Kucha kingdom instead.

The Princess of Wusun has been linked to a story about the invention of pipa – the instrument was said to have been created on the order of the Han emperor so that music could be played on horseback to soothe her longings on the way to the Wusun. Pipa, however, is likely to be of non-Chinese origin. Her story is also often conflated with that of Wang Zhaojun after the Jin dynasty writer Shi Chong speculated that pipa might have also been played during Wang Zhaojun's journey as in the story for Xijun.

== Poem ==
A poem credited to Xijun is given in Hanshu:

| 悲愁歌 吾家嫁我兮天一方， 遠托異國兮烏孫王。 穹廬為室兮旃為牆， 以肉為食兮酪為漿。 居常土思兮心內傷， 願為黃鵠兮歸故鄉。 | Song of Sorrow My family married me off to the edge of the world Far away in the strange land of the Wusun king A domed hut is my chamber, the felt my walls Meat is my food, fermented milk my drink Living here, I long for my land, and my heart aches Wishing I could be a yellow swan, (Note: Yellow swan (黃鵠, huánghú) is a legendary bird in China that can fly nonstop for a thousand Chinese miles) and return to my old home |
