= Yinxing de Chibang =

Yinxing de Chibang (simplified Chinese: 隐形的翅膀; traditional Chinese: 隱形的翅膀; pinyin: Yǐnxíng de Chìbǎng) may refer to:

- "Yinxing de Chibang" ("Invisible Wings"), first track from Pandora (Angela Chang album)
- Invisible Wings, 2007 Chinese film
- Angel Wings (TV series), 2016 Chinese TV series
