= 128 BC =

128 BC in various calendars
- Gregorian calendar: 128 BC; CXXVIII BC
- Ab urbe condita: 626
- Ancient Egypt era: XXXIII dynasty, 196
- Pharaoh: Ptolemy VIII Physcon, 18
- Ancient Greek Olympiad (summer): 163rd Olympiad (victor)¹
- Assyrian calendar: 4623
- Balinese saka calendar: N/A
- Bengali calendar: −721 – −720
- Berber calendar: 823
- Buddhist calendar: 417
- Burmese calendar: −765
- Byzantine calendar: 5381–5382
- Chinese calendar: 壬子年 (Water Rat); 2570 or 2363 — to — 癸丑年 (Water Ox); 2571 or 2364
- Coptic calendar: −411 – −410
- Discordian calendar: 1039
- Ethiopian calendar: −135 – −134
- Hebrew calendar: 3633–3634
- Hindu calendars
- Vikram Samvat: −71 – −70
- Shaka Samvat: N/A
- Kali Yuga: 2973–2974
- Holocene calendar: 9873
- Iranian calendar: 749 BP – 748 BP
- Islamic calendar: 772 BH – 771 BH
- Javanese calendar: N/A
- Julian calendar: N/A
- Korean calendar: 2206
- Minguo calendar: 2039 before ROC 民前2039年
- Nanakshahi calendar: −1595
- Seleucid era: 184/185 AG
- Thai solar calendar: 415–416
- Tibetan calendar: ཆུ་ཕོ་བྱི་བ་ལོ་ (male Water-Rat) −1 or −382 or −1154 — to — ཆུ་མོ་གླང་ལོ་ (female Water-Ox); 0 or −381 or −1153

Year 128 BC was a year of the pre-Julian Roman calendar. At the time it was known as the Year of the Consulship of Octavius and Rufus (or, less frequently, year 626 Ab urbe condita) and the First Year of Yuanshuo. The denomination 128 BC for this year has been used since the early medieval period when the Anno Domini calendar era became the prevalent method in Europe for naming years.

== Events ==
=== By place ===
==== Roman Republic ====
- Cn. Octavius and T. Annius Rufus are this year's consuls

==== Bactria ====
- The Greco-Bactrian kingdom is overrun by the Tokhari.

==== Parthia ====
- Artabanus I becomes king of Parthia (approximate date)

==== China ====
- In response to Han incursions, in 128 or 127 the Xiongnu invade northern China. They kill the governor of Liaoxi, defeat the governor of Yuyang, capture 2000 of the inhabitants of Liaoxi and Yuyang and defeat the Han general Han Anguo. Han Anguo and his cavalry force are surrounded in their camp but the arrival of relief forces coming from Yan causes the Xiongnu army to withdraw. The Xiongnu also invade Yanmen and kill or capture 1000 people.
- The Han general Wei Qing, with an army of 30,000 cavalrymen, defeats a Xiongnu army north of Yanmen. The Han general Li Xi attacks the Xiongnu further to the east, riding out of Dai Prefecture.
- Having spent a year in Greater Yuezhi, the Han diplomat Zhang Qian begins his return journey to China, having failed to persuade Yuezhi's king to form an alliance against the Xiongnu. Passing by the Pamir, Kunlun, Altun and Qilian Mountains, he and his retinue are then captured by the Xiongnu and taken into custody.

=== By topic ===
==== Arts and sciences ====
- Limenius composes the Second Delphic Hymn.

== Births ==
- Liu Ju, Chinese prince of the Han dynasty (d. 91 BC)

== Deaths ==
- Liu Fei, Chinese prince of the Han dynasty (b. 169 BC)
- Phraates II, king of Parthia (approximate date)
