= A Beautiful New World =

- International DVD cover
- Traditional Chinese: 美麗新世界
- Simplified Chinese: 美丽新世界
- Hanyu Pinyin: Měilì Xīn Shìjiè
- Directed by: Shi Runjiu
- Written by: Liu Fendou; Wang Yao; Shi Runjiu
- Produced by: Peter Loehr
- Starring: Jiang Wu; Tao Hong
- Cinematography: Lü Yue
- Edited by: Yang Hongyu
- Production companies: Xi'an Film Studio; Imar Film Company
- Distributed by: Fortissimo Films
- Release dates: February 19, 1999 (Berlin); October 15, 1999 (Hong Kong)
- Running time: 97 minutes
- Country: China
- Language: Mandarin
- Budget: $300,000 (estimated)

A Beautiful New World is a 1999 Chinese comedy film directed by Shi Runjiu. The film, Shi's first (he had previously served as an assistant director for Lu Yue's Mr. Zhao), was co-produced by Xi'an Film Studio and the independent Imar Film Company. It was Imar Film's second production, coming after 1997's Spicy Love Soup.

Set in Shanghai, the film stars Jiang Wu and Tao Hong as a mismatched pair. Taiwanese pop stars Richie Jen and Wu Bai are cast in minor roles.

== Cast ==
- Jiang Wu as Zhang Baogen, a country boy, who upon winning the lottery, heads to Shanghai to claim his prize, a new apartment.
- Tao Hong as Huang Jinfang, Baogen's debt ridden city cousin, who apprehensively offers up her home to her distant country relative.
- Chen Ning as Chen Minghui, Jinfang's best friend.
- Richie Jen as Bai, Minghui's boyfriend.
- Wu Bai as Liang, a street musician, who befriends Baogen.
- Tong Zhengwei as Auntie Cai, Jinfang's elderly neighbor.
- Cheng Lei (cameo)
- Niu Ben (cameo)

== Reception ==
Derek Elley of Variety praised the film as "a beautifully played, accessible pic that rewrites the rule book on mainland Chinese cinema."

== Awards and nominations ==
- 1999 Beijing College Student Film Festival
  - Won — Best Actress (Tao Hong)
- 1999 Hawaii International Film Festival
  - Won — Special Jury Award (Jiang Wu)
