= Sishui =

Sishui may refer to the following in China:

- Sishui County (泗水县), in Shandong
- Si River, or Sishui (泗水), river in Shandong
- Sishui Pass (汜水关), or Hulao Pass, mountain pass in Henan
- Sishui, Postal Romanization for Xishui County, Hubei
- Sishui Kingdom (泗水國), kingdom of Han dynasty
- Sishui Commandery (泗水郡), commandery of Qin dynasty

Towns

- Sishui, Gulang County (泗水镇), in Gulang County, Gansu
- Sishui, Gaozhou (泗水镇), Guangdong
- Sishui, Pingyuan County, Guangdong (泗水镇), town
- Sishui, Xingyang (汜水镇), Henan
- Sishui, Sishui County (泗水镇), Shandong

== See also ==
- Shisui, Kumamoto, a town in Japan
- Surabaya, a city in Indonesia, written as 泗水 for Chinese
