= 29th Hundred Flowers Awards =

Chinese film awards ceremony in 2008

The 29th Hundred Flowers Awards was a ceremony held on October 16, 2008 in Dalian, Jilin province. The nominees were announced on August 14.

== Awards and nominations ==
=== Best Film ===
Winner	Winning film	Nominees
N/A	Assembly	* Runner-up: The Knot * Runner-up: Invisible Wings * The Tokyo Trial * Crazy Stone

=== Best Director ===
Winner	Winning film	Nominees
Feng Xiaogang	Assembly	* Stephen Chow for CJ 7 * Ning Hao for Crazy Stone * Yin Li for The Knot * Gao Qunshu for The Tokyo Trial

=== Best Actor ===
Winner	Winning film	Nominees
Zhang Hanyu	Assembly	* Chen Kun for The Knot * Guo Tao for Crazy Stone * Jet Li for The Warlords * Damian Lau for The Tokyo Trial

=== Best Actress ===
Winner	Winning film	Nominees
Li Bingbing	The Knot	* Tang Yan for Assembly * Gao Yuanyuan for Rob-B-Hood * Xu Ruoxuan for The Knot * Gigi Leung for The Secret of the Magic Gourd

=== Best Supporting Actor ===
Winner	Winning film	Nominees
Deng Chao	Assembly	* Chin Han for The Knot * Jay Chou for Curse of the Golden Flower * Xu Zheng for Crazy Stone * Chen Baoguo for Rob-B-Hood

=== Best Supporting Actress ===
Winner	Winning film	Nominees
Gua Ah-leh	The Knot	* Luo Haiqiong for Assembly * Hou Zhu for Crazy Stone * Yang Jing for Invisible Wings
