= 彼岸花 =

彼岸花, meaning equinox flower, may refer to:

- Beautiful Reborn Flower, 2020 Chinese web series starring Lin Yun and Song Weilong
- "Bi'anhua", a track in 2016 Chinese television series Princess Jieyou Soundtrack
- Equinox Flower, 1958 color Japanese film
- The Flower Across the Bank, 2001 Chinese novel by Anni Baobei
- "Flower of Paradise", a track in 2000 Mandarin album Fable by Faye Wong
- "Higanbana", episode 5 of Moonlight Lady released on July 23, 2004
