= Yang Prefecture (Jiangsu) =

Prefecture of imperial China

Yangzhou or Yang Prefecture (揚州) was a zhou (prefecture) in imperial China, centering on modern Yangzhou, Jiangsu, China. It existed (intermittently) from 589 until 1912.

In the 10th century, during Wu and Southern Tang it was known as Jiangdu Prefecture (江都府).

The modern prefecture-level city, established in 1949, retains its name.

== Population ==
In the early 1100s during the Song dynasty, there were 56,485 households and 107,579 people.

== See also ==
- Guangling Commandery
