= Lü Yue (cinematographer) =

Chinese cinematographer and film director

- Born: December 1957 (age 68); Tianjin, China
- Education: Beijing Film Academy
- Occupations: Cinematographer, film director
- Years active: 1982 - present
- Awards: LAFCA Award for Best Cinematography; 1995 Shanghai Triad; NYFCC Award for Best Cinematography; 1995 Shanghai Triad; Golden Leopard; 1998 Mr. Zhao; Tokyo Special Jury Prize; 2006 Thirteen Princess Trees

Chinese name
- Traditional Chinese: 呂樂
- Simplified Chinese: 吕乐
Transcriptions
Standard Mandarin
- Hanyu Pinyin: Lǚ Yuè

Lü Yue (simplified Chinese: 吕乐; traditional Chinese: 呂樂, born December 1957) is a Chinese cinematographer and film director.

== Early life ==
In December 1957, Lu was born in Tianjin, China.

== Career ==
Lü is today among the most important cinematographers of recent Chinese cinema, and is particularly well known for his collaborations with director Zhang Yimou with whom he served as director of photography in three films. Lü was nominated for an Academy Award for best cinematographer for Zhang's film Shanghai Triad. He has also served as cinematographer for other Fifth Generation directors such as Tian Zhuangzhuang (for 1985's On the Hunting Ground) as well as for older directors, such as Huang Shuqin (for 1994's A Soul Haunted by Painting). More recently he served as cinematographer for actress Joan Chen's directorial effort, Xiu Xiu: The Sent Down Girl, a film in which he also played a small part as the titular character's father.

Lü has also found measured success as director; his debut film, Mr. Zhao, was well-received, winning the Golden Leopard at the Locarno International Film Festival.

== Filmography ==
=== As cinematographer ===
Year	English Title	Chinese Title	Director
1985	On the Hunting Ground	猎场扎撒	Tian Zhuangzhuang
1987	Buddha's Lock	天菩萨	Yim Ho
1994	A Soul Haunted by Painting	画魂	Huang Shuqin
1994	To Live	活着	Zhang Yimou
1995	Shanghai Triad	摇啊摇，摇到外婆桥	Zhang Yimou
1997	Keep Cool	有话好好说	Zhang Yimou
1998	Xiu Xiu: The Sent Down Girl	天浴	Joan Chen
1999	A Beautiful New World	美丽新世界	Shi Runjiu
2000	Breaking the Silence	漂亮妈妈	Sun Zhou
2002	On the Other Side of the Bridge	芬妮的微笑	Hu Mei
2003	The Legend of the Evil Lake	NA	Lee Kwang-hoon
2007	Assembly	集结号	Feng Xiaogang
2008	Red Cliff	赤壁	John Woo
2008	If You Are the One	非诚勿扰	Feng Xiaogang
2010	Aftershock	唐山大地震	Feng Xiaogang

=== As director ===
Year	English Title	Chinese Title	Notes
1990	Nujiang, La Vallée Perdue	怒江，一条丢失的峡谷	Best Film of 1990 Paris Anthropology Film Festival
1998	Mr. Zhao	赵先生	Golden Leopard at Locarno
2003	The Foliage	美人草	
2006	The Obscure	小说	
2006	Thirteen Princess Trees	十三棵泡桐	Special Jury Prize at Tokyo
2018	Lost, Found	找到你	

== Awards ==
- Paris Anthropology Film Festival, 1990
  - Best Film for Nujiang, La Vallée Perdue
- Camerimage Awards, 1995
  - Golden Frog for Shanghai Triad (nominated)
- 48th Cannes Film Festival, 1995
  - Best Technology Award for Shanghai Triad
- Los Angeles Film Critics Association Awards, 1995
  - Best Cinematography for Shanghai Triad
- New York Film Critics Circle Awards, 1995
  - Best Cinematography for Shanghai Triad
- 68th Academy Awards, 1996
  - Best Cinematography for Shanghai Triad (nominated)
- Locarno International Film Festival, 1998
  - Golden Leopard for Mr. Zhao
- AFI Fest, 1998
  - Grand Jury Prize for Mr. Zhao (nominated)
- 19th Tokyo International Film Festival, 2006
  - Special Jury Prize for Thirteen Princess Trees
- 7th Asia Pacific Screen Awards, 2013
  - Achievement in Cinematography for Back to 1942
- Festival Internationale del Film Di Roma AIC, 2012
  - Best Cinematography Award for Back to 1942
