= Feng Liao =

Chinese diplomat

Feng Liao (馮嫽) was China's first official female diplomat, who represented the Han dynasty to Wusun (烏孫), which was in the Western Regions. It was a practice for the Imperial Court to foster alliances with the northern tribes via marriage, and two Han princesses had married Wusun kings.

Feng Liao was the maidservant of Princess Jieyou (解憂公主), who was married off to a Wusun king. Feng herself later married an influential Wusun general, whose good standing with Prince Wujiutu (烏就屠) of the kingdom later proved beneficial to the Han dynasty.

When Prince Wujiutu seized the throne of Wusun in 64 BC, after his father died, there was fear in the Imperial Court of Han that Wujiutu, whose mother was Xiongnu, would allow Wusun to become Xiongnu's vassal.

Zheng Ji, Governor of the Western Regions, recalled that Feng Liao had married into Wusun and with her familiarity of the Wusun customs, she was a prime candidate to persuade Wujiutu to ally his kingdom with Han. Wujiutu acceded and Emperor Xuan of Han (漢宣帝) sent for Feng.

The Emperor received Feng Liao in his palace in Chang'an and took her advice of granting Wujiutu a title to secure his loyalty. The emperor appointed her as chief envoy and dispatched her again to Wusun, this time with an official hanjie (汉节) given to diplomats of the Han Dynasty. She announced Yuanguimi as the Great Kunmi (chief king) of Wusun, and Wujiutu the Lesser Kunmi. Wusun thereafter became a vassal state of the Western Han.

She then returned to Chang'an with Princess Jieyou, only to return again as envoy after Yuanguimi died and his son with Princess Jieyou, Xingmi 星靡, succeeded him.

== Historical Sources and Archives ==
Multiple historical texts produced from the Han dynasty and later ancient Chinese dynasties recorded Feng's accomplishments. The best known sources out of them are The Book of Han and Zizhi Tongjian, specifically the 19th chapter on the Han dynasty. In addition to those texts, a collection of Han bamboo and wooden slips found in Dunhuang described some of Feng Liao's life in Wusun.
