= Guangling Commandery =

Historic commandery of China

- Traditional Chinese: 廣陵郡
- Simplified Chinese: 广陵郡
- Literal meaning: Commandery of the Expansive Tomb(s)
Transcriptions
Standard Mandarin
- Hanyu Pinyin: Guǎnglíng jùn
- Wade–Giles: Kuang-ling Chün

Guangling Commandery was a historical commandery of China from Han dynasty to Tang dynasty, located in present-day central Jiangsu province in central coastal China. It was named after Guangling, a historical name of Yangzhou.

In early Han dynasty, the commandery was known as Dongyang (東陽), and successively constituted part of the Wu Kingdom (195–154 BC) and the Jiangdu Kingdom (154–121 BC). In 121 BC, Jiangdu was abolished, and Guangling became a commandery. In 117 BC, Guangling was granted to Liu Xu (劉胥), a son of the reigning Emperor Wu, as a kingdom. Xu and his descendants ruled Guangling until the usurpation of Wang Mang.

The commandery was restored when Eastern Han was founded. In 37 AD, it absorbed the Sishui Kingdom. In 58, it was granted to Liu Jing (劉荊), a son of the Emperor Guangwu, but was revoked when Jing was involved in a conspiracy in 67. In 140, the commandery administered 11 counties: Guangling, Jiangdu (江都), Gaoyou (高郵), Ping'an (平安), Ling (淩), Dongyang (東陽), Sheyang (射陽), Yandu (鹽瀆), Yu (舆), Tangyi (堂邑) and Haixi (海西). The population was 410,190 individuals or 83,970 households.

From the Three Kingdoms period to the Liu Song dynasty, a number of counties were transferred to neighboring Xiapi (下邳) and Linhuai (臨淮) commanderies. In 464, four counties – Guangling, Hailing (海陵), Gaoyou and Jiangdu – remained in the commandery. The total population was 45,613 individuals, or 7,744 households. The commandery was abolished in early Sui dynasty.

In the Tang dynasty, Guangling Commandery was the alternative name of the Yang Prefecture. In 741, it administered 7 counties, namely Jiangdu, Jiangyang (江陽), Luhe (六合), Hailing, Yangzi (揚子) and Tianchang (天長). The population was 467,857 individuals or 77,105 households.
