= Runan Commandery =

Historical political subdivision in China

Runan Commandery (Chinese: 汝南郡) was a Chinese commandery from Han dynasty to Tang dynasty, located in modern Henan and Anhui provinces. The name referred to its location to the south of Ru River (汝水), a historical river that flowed into the Huai.

Runan was part of the Huaiyang Kingdom in early Western Han dynasty. In 156 BC, Runan was granted to Liu Fei, son of the reigning Emperor Jing as a principality. A year later, Fei's fief was changed to Jiangdu (江都), and Runan became a commandery. In late Western Han dynasty, it administered 37 counties, Pingyu (平輿), Yang'an (陽安), Yangcheng (陽城), Liqiang (郦強), Fubo (富波), Nüyang (女陽), Tongyang (鮦陽), Wufang (吳房), Ancheng (安成), Nandun (南頓), Langling (朗陵), Xiyang (細陽), Yichun (宜春), Nüyin (女陰), Xincai (新蔡), Xinxi (新息), Quyang (灈陽), Qisi (期思), Shenyang (慎陽), Shen (慎), Zhaoling (召陵), Yiyang (弋陽), Xiping (西平), Shangcai (上蔡), Qin (浸), Xihua (西華), Changping (長平), Xilu (宜祿), Xiang (項), Xinqi (新郪), Guide (歸德), Xinyang (新陽), Anchang (安昌), Anyang (安陽), Boyang (博陽), Chengyang (成陽) and Dingling (定陵). In 2 AD, the population was 2,596,148, in 461,587 households. In 140 AD during Eastern Han dynasty, the commandery administered 37 counties and had a population of 2,100,788, in 404,448 households.

Two new commanderies, Yiyang and Ruyin (汝陰) was separated from Runan under Emperor Wen of Wei and Emperor Wu of Jin, respectively. In 280 AD, Runan Commandery retained 15 counties with the population was 21,500 households, while the three commanderies together had a population of 46,700 households. During Emperor Hui's reign, two new commanderies, Xincai and Nandun, were established in the region. Under Northern Wei, the commandery consisted of 8 counties, and the Book of Wei recorded a population of 37,061, or 15,889 households. The commandery was abolished in early Sui dynasty.

Runan was part of Yu Prefecture until Northern Zhou dynasty, during which the prefecture was renamed Cai (蔡州). Later during Sui and Tang dynasties, Runan Commandery became an alternative name of Cai Prefecture. In 741 AD, the prefecture consisted of 10 counties, and the total population was 460,205, or 87,061 households.
