= Heqin =

Historical practices of imperial marriage alliances in China

- Traditional Chinese: 和親
- Simplified Chinese: 和亲
Transcriptions
Standard Mandarin
- Hanyu Pinyin: Héqīn
- Wade–Giles: Ho-ch‘in

Heqin, also known as marriage alliance, refers to the historical practice in China of marrying women—often members of minor branches of a ruling family—to domestic and foreign rulers, nobles, and military commanders. Its goals included maintaining peace, resolving conflicts, and forging political or military alliances. Wang Zhaojun of the Han dynasty and Princess Wencheng of the Tang dynasty are among the most famous heqin princesses.

== Zhou dynasty ==
Zhou kings married women from Beidi in order to forge military alliances against rivals. King Hui of Zhou married a princess of the Red Di as a sign of appreciation for Di troops. King Xiang of Zhou married a Di princess in exchange for military support against Zheng.

== Han dynasty ==
Lou Jing proposed granting the eldest daughter of Emperor Gaozu of Han to Modu Chanyu of the Xiongnu. It was adopted in 198 BC following the Battle of Baideng two years prior, although another member of the royal clan was sent instead due to opposition from the Han court. Sometimes commoner women were falsely labeled as "princesses" or members of the imperial family. The practice continued until Han dynasty's strength surpassed that of the Xiongnu.

- 200–176 BC: Han emperors married three "princesses" to Xiongnu chieftain Modu Chanyu.
- 174–162 BC: Emperor Wen of Han married two "princesses" to Xiongnu chieftain Laoshang Chanyu. One of them was accompanied by a Yan eunuch named Zhonghang Yue as her tutor.
- 160–140 BC: Han emperors married five Han "princesses" to Xiongnu chieftain Gunchen Chanyu.
- 108 BC: Emperor Wu of Han marries Liu Xijun (刘细君 130–101 BC), daughter of Liu Jian (刘建, Prince of Jiangdu (江都王 d. 121 BC)), granddaughter of Prince Yi of Jiangdu, to King Liejiaomi of Wusun.
- 103 BC: Emperor Wu of Han marries Liu Jieyou (刘解忧 121–49 BC) to King Junxumi of Wusun (Liejiaomi's grandson). After Junxumi's death in 93 BC, Princess Jieyou, in accordance with Wusun tradition, married his successor (and younger brother), King Wengguimi. After Wengguimi's death in 60 BC, Princess Jieyou again remarried his successor King Nimi (son of Junximi and a Xiongnu princess).
- 33 BC: Emperor Yuan of Han marries Wang Zhaojun (王昭君 52 BC – 15), a lady of the imperial harem, to Xiongnu chieftain Huhanye. After Huhanye's death in 31 BC, she remarried Huhanye's successor (his son by his first wife and thus her stepson) Fuzhuleiruodi Chanyu.

=== Xiongnu ===
The Xiongnu practiced marriage alliances with Han dynasty officers and officials by marrying off daughters of the Chanyu (the Xiongnu ruler) to Han people who joined the Xiongnu and Xiongnu in Han service. The daughter of the Laoshang Chanyu (and older sister of Junchen Chanyu and Yizhixie Chanyu) was married to the Xiongnu General Zhao Xin, the Marquis of Xi who was serving the Han dynasty. The daughter of the Qiedihou Chanyu was married to the Han general Li Ling after he surrendered and defected. The Yenisei Kirghiz Khagans claimed descent from Li Ling. Another Han general who defected to the Xiongnu was Li Guangli who also married a daughter of the Hulugu Chanyu. The Han diplomat Su Wu married a Xiongnu woman given by Li Ling when he was arrested and taken captive. The Han explorer Zhang Qian married a Xiongnu woman and had a child with her when he was taken captive by the Xiongnu. The Emperor Wu of Han dispatched Zhang Qian to explore the Western Regions and to form an alliance with the Yuezhi people in order to combat the Xiongnu. During this time Zhang married a Xiongnu wife, who bore him a son, and gained the trust of the Xiongnu leader.

The Yenisei Kyrgyz khagans of the Yenisei Kyrgyz Khaganate claimed descent from the Han general Li Ling, grandson of the famous general Li Guang. Li Ling was captured by the Xiongnu and defected in the first century BCE. Since the Tang imperial Li family also claimed descent from Li Guang, the Kirghiz Khagan was therefore recognized as a member of the Tang imperial family. This relationship soothed the relationship when Kyrgyz khagan Are (阿熱) invaded Uyghur Khaganate and put Qasar Qaghan to the sword; the news was brought to Chang'an by Kyrgyz ambassador Zhuwu Hesu (註吾合素). Ban Zhi married a Xiongnu Jin royal woman from the Xiutu royal family.

== Kingdom of Khotan ==
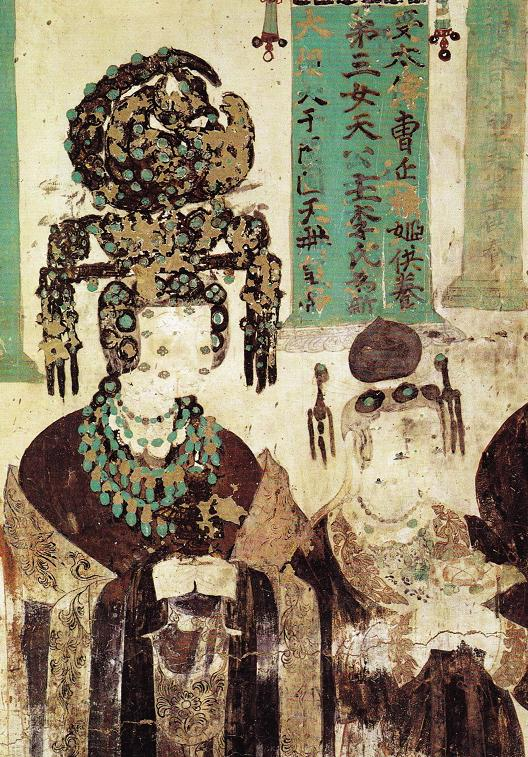
A daughter of the King of Khotan married to the ruler of Dunhuang, Cao Yanlu, is here shown wearing elaborate headdress decorated with jade pieces. Mural in Mogao Cave 61, Five Dynasties.

The Cao family of ethnic Han descent that ruled the Guiyi Circuit established marriage alliances with the Saka Kingdom of Khotan, with both the Cao rulers marrying Khotanese princesses and with Cao princesses marrying Khotan rulers. A Khotan princess who was the daughter of the King of Khotan married Cao Yanlu.

== Sixteen Kingdoms ==
During the Sixteen Kingdoms period, there were a total of six recorded instances of heqin marriage. Heqin marriage alliances during the Sixteen Kingdoms period differed from those practiced during the Han dynasty in two main ways. First, they involved "real" princesses (i.e. daughters of emperors or rulers). Second, unlike during the Han dynasty, when most heqin marriages were aimed at establishing peace with foreign nations, heqin marriages during the Sixteen Kingdoms period were made primarily to settle rivalries and maintain a balance of power between the various states in China at the time.

- Fu Jian (337–385), Emperor Xuanzhao of Former Qin, married one of his daughters to Yang Ding, ruler of the state of Chouchi.
- Fu Deng, Emperor Gao of Former Qin, married his younger sister, Princess Dongping (东平公主) to Qifu Gangui, Prince of Western Qi.
- 441: Feng Ba, Emperor Wencheng of Northern Yan, married his daughter, Princess Lelang (乐浪公主), to Yujiulü Hulü, Khan Aidougai of Rouran.
- 415: Yao Xing, Emperor Wenhuan of Later Qin, married his daughter, Princess Xiping (西平公主), to Emperor Mingyuan of Northern Wei. Because she was unable to forge a golden statue with her own hands, she was never formally empress, but was nevertheless recognized and respected as Emperor Mingyuan's wife, Consort Yao.
- Qifu Chipan, Prince Wenzhao of Western Qin, married his daughter, Princess Xingping (兴平公主), to Juqu Mengxun, Prince of Northern Liang's son Juqu Xingguo.
- 433: Juqu Mengxun, Prince of Northern Liang, marries his daughter, Princess Xingping (兴平公主), to Emperor Taiwu of Northern Wei. She became Emperor Taiwu's concubine.

== Northern and Southern dynasties ==
During the Northern and Southern dynasties period, China was divided into many rival states. A complicated system of rivalries and vassalage existed. Heqin marriage was employed as a method to maintain a balance of power or to solidify alliances between states.

During the Northern and Southern dynasties, there were five instances of heqin marriage.

- 428: Emperor Mingyuan of Northern Wei marries his daughter, Princess Shiping (始平公主), to Helian Chang, Emperor of Xia.
- 437: Emperor Mingyuan of Northern Wei marries his daughter, Princess Wuwei (武威公主), to Juqu Mujian, Prince Ai of Hexi, last ruler of the state of Northern Liang, whence she is known as Princess Tuoba.
- Princess Lanling (兰陵公主), a princess of the imperial family of Northern Wei, married the Khagan of the Rouran Khaganate, Yujiulü Anagui.
- Princess Qianjin (千金公主), daughter of Yuwen Zhao, Prince of Zhao (赵王宇文招) and a member of the imperial family of Northern Zhou, married Ishbara, Khagan of the Eastern Turkic Khaganate.
- 582: Emperor Ming of Western Liang marries his daughter, Princess Xiao, to Yang Guang, Prince of Jin, the second son Emperor Ming's overlord, Emperor Wen of Sui. She is known as Empress Xiao of Sui after his accession to the throne as Emperor Yang of Sui.

=== Northern Wei ===
The Tuoba imperial family of the Xianbei-led Northern Wei dynasty started to arrange for ethnic Han elites to marry daughters of the imperial family in the 480s. More than fifty percent of Tuoba Xianbei princesses of the Northern Wei were married to southern Han men from the imperial families and aristocrats from southern China of the Southern dynasties who defected and moved north to join the Northern Wei. Some exiled royalty of Han descent fled from southern China and defected to the Northern Wei. Several daughters of the Xianbei Emperor Xiaowen of Northern Wei were married to ethnic Han elites, the Liu Song royal Liu Hui 刘辉, married Princess Lanling 蘭陵公主 of the Northern Wei, Princess Huayang 華陽公主 to Sima Fei 司馬朏, a descendant of Jin dynasty (266–420) royalty, Princess Jinan 濟南公主 to Lu Daoqian 盧道虔, Princess Nanyang 南阳长公主 to Xiao Baoyin 萧宝夤, a member of Southern Qi royalty. Emperor Xiaozhuang of Northern Wei's sisters, the Shouyang Princess was wedded to the Liang dynasty ruler Emperor Wu of Liang's son Xiao Zong 蕭綜. One of Emperor Xiaowu of Northern Wei's sister was married to Zhang Huan, an ethnic Han, according to the Book of Zhou. His name is given as Zhang Xin in the Book of Northern Qi and History of the Northern Dynasties which mention his marriage to a Xianbei princess of Wei. His personal name was changed due to a naming taboo on the emperor's name. He was the son of Zhang Qiong.

When the Eastern Jin dynasty ended Northern Wei received the Jin prince Sima Chuzhi (司馬楚之) as a refugee. A Northern Wei Princess married Sima Chuzhi, giving birth to Sima Jinlong. Northern Liang Lushuihu King Juqu Mujian's daughter married Sima Jinlong.

=== Rouran ===
The Rouran Khaganate arranged for one of their princesses, Khagan Yujiulü Anagui's daughter Princess Ruru 蠕蠕公主 to be married to the ethnic Han regent Gao Huan of the Eastern Wei.

== Gaochang ==
The Kingdom of Gaochang was made out of ethnic Han colonists and ruled by the Han people Qu family, which originated from Gansu. Jincheng commandery (金城 in Lanzhou), district of Yuzhong (榆中) was the home of the Qu Jia. The Qu family was linked by marriage alliances to the Turks, with a Turk being the grandmother of King Qu Boya's.

== Sui dynasty ==
With the establishment of the Sui dynasty in 581, much of China proper was once again unified under one dynasty. Heqin marriage during the Sui dynasty therefore returned to its original purpose of trying to appease barbarian tribes surrounding the Sui. There were a total of seven instances of heqin marriage during the Sui dynasty.

- 597: Emperor Wen of Sui marries Princess Anyi (安义公主), a Sui "princess", to Yami Qaghan, Khagan of the Eastern Turkic Khaganate. She was assassinated by Yung Yu- lu in 599
- 599: Emperor Wen of Sui marries another Sui princess, Princess Yicheng (义成公主), the daughter of a Sui imperial clansman, to Yami, Khagan of the Eastern Turkic Khaganate. After his death in 609, Princess Yicheng, in accordance with the Göktürk custom of levirate marriage, remarried to Yami Qaghan's successor and son (by another wife), Shibi Qaghan. After Shibi Qaghan's death in 619, Princess Yicheng again remarried to Shibi Qaghan's successor and younger brother, Chuluo. After the khagan's death in 621, Princess Yicheng remarried for the fourth and final time to his successor and younger brother, Illig Qaghan, who revolted against Tang China and was captured and killed in 630
- Emperor Yang of Sui married Princess Xinyi (信义公主), a Sui "princess", to Heshana Khan, Khagan of the Western Turkish Khaganate.
- Emperor Yang of Sui married his youngest daughter, Princess Huainan (淮南公主), to the new heir, Shibi's eldest son, Tuli.
- 596: Emperor Wen of Sui marries Princess Guanghua (光化公主), a Sui "princess", to Murong Shifu, khagan of Tuyuhun. After Murong Shifu's assassination in 597, Princess Guanghua remarried Murong Shifu's successor and younger brother, Murong Fuyun.
- Emperor Yang of Sui married a Sui "princess" to Qu Boya, ruler of the oasis city of Gaochang in the Taklamakan Desert.

== Tang dynasty ==
During the Tang dynasty, heqin marriage alliances were primarily aimed at the Tuyuhun, the Tibetan Empire, the Khitans and the allied Kumo Xi, the Uyghur Khaganate, and Nanzhao.

There were a total of twenty-one instances of heqin marriage alliances during the Tang dynasty, including:

- 640: Emperor Taizong of Tang marries Princess Honghua (弘化公主) to Murong Nuohebo, Khan of Tuyuhun.
- 641: Emperor Taizong of Tang marries Princess Wencheng to Emperor Songtsän Gampo of Tibet.
- 642: Emperor Taizong proposed the marriage of his fifteenth daughter, Princess Xinxing (新兴公主), to Zhenzhu Khan, Khan of Xueyantuo. The heqin was called off.
- 664: Emperor Gaozong of Tang marries Lady Jincheng (金城县主), the third daughter of Li Dao'en, Prince of Guiji (会稽郡王李道恩), to Prince Sudumomo of Tuyuhun (吐谷浑王子苏度摸末).
- 664: Emperor Gaozong marries Lady Jinming (金明县主), the daughter of a Tang imperial clansman, to Prince Talumomo of Tuyuhun (吐谷浑王子闼卢摸末).
- 698: A daughter of Qapaghan, Khagan of the Second Eastern Turkic Khaganate marries Wu Zetian's great-nephew Wu Chengsi, Prince of Huaiyang (淮阳王武延秀).
- 703: A daughter of Qapaghan Khagan marries Crown Prince Li Dan's eldest son Li Chengqi, Prince of Song.
- 709: Empress Wu Zetian marries her great-granddaughter Princess Jincheng (金城公主), the daughter of her grandson Li Shouli, Prince of Bin, to Emperor Me Agtsom of Tibet
- 712: Emperor Ruizong of Tang marries his granddaughter, Princess Jinshan (金山公主), the daughter of his son Li Chengqi, to Qapaghan Khagan
- 717: Emperor Xuanzong of Tang marries Princess Yongle (永乐公主), the daughter of Yang Yuansi (杨元嗣) and a daughter of Li Xu, Prince of Dongping (东平王李续, son of Li Shen, Prince of Ji, the seventeenth son of Emperor Taizong), to Li Shihuo (李失活), leader of the Khitans.
- 717: Princess Jianghe (交河公主), the daughter of Ashina Nahuaidao, 10th Khagan of the Western Turkic Khaganate, marries Sulu Khan, Khagan of Turgesh.
- 722: Emperor Xuanzong of Tang marries Princess Yanjun (燕郡公主) (surname Murong (慕容)), a Tang "princess", to Khitan prince Li Yuyu (李郁于).
- 726: Emperor Xuanzong marries his niece, Princess Donghua (东华公主, surname Chen 陈), to Khitan prince Li Shaogu (李邵固).
- 726: Emperor Xuanzong marries Princess Dongguang (东光公主), the daughter of Emperor Xuanzong's first cousin Li Jijiang, Princess Cheng'an (成安公主李季姜 eighth daughter of Emperor Zhongzong of Tang) and Wei Jie (韦捷), to Li Lusu (李鲁苏), ruler of Kumo Xi.
- 744: Emperor Xuanzong marries Princess Heyi (和义公主), a daughter of Li Can, Magistrate of Gaocheng (告城县令李参), to Axilan Dagan (阿悉烂达干), King of Ningyuan (宁远国王) in the Fergana Valley.
- 745: Emperor Xuanzong marries his granddaughter, Princess Jingle (静乐公主, daughter of his fifteenth daughter Princess Xincheng 信成公主 and Dugu Ming 独孤明), to Khitan prince Li Huaixiu (李怀秀).
- 745: Emperor Xuanzong marries Princess Yifang (宜芳公主), daughter of Princess Changning (长宁公主, daughter of Emperor Zhongzong of Tang) and Yang Shenjiao (杨慎交), to Khitan prince Li Yanchong (李延宠)
- 756: Emperor Suzong of Tang marries his daughter, Princess Ninguo to Bayanchur, Khagan of the Uyghur Khaganate. In exchange, Princess Pijia (毗伽公主), daughter of Bayanchur, marries Li Chengcai (李承采), Prince of Dunhuang (敦煌王李承采), son of Li Shouli, Prince of Bin.

== Liao, Song, Jin dynasties ==
=== Song dynasty ===
The Khitan-led Liao dynasty asked for a Song princess to marry the Liao emperor in the negotiations leading up to the Chanyuan Treaty but the Song dynasty refused to give a princess. The Jurchen-led Jin dynasty later rebelled against the Liao dynasty, sacked and destroyed the Liao supreme capital and burned the ancestral tombs of the Liao emperors. The Emperor Tianzuo of Liao was executed by the Jurchens during a polo match. Liao imperial princesses from the Yelü family and Xiao family were also distributed to Jin princes as concubine. Wanyan Liang married the Khitan women Lady Xiao (蕭氏), Consort Chen (宸妃), Lady Yelü (耶律氏), Consort Li (麗妃), Lady Yelü (耶律氏), Consort Rou (柔妃) and Lady Yelü (耶律氏), Zhaoyuan (昭媛).

The Jin dynasty then attacked the Northern Song dynasty in the Jingkang incident and seized a large number of the Song imperial family. Song princesses were married off to Jin princes such as Emperor Xizong of Jin. The Song male princes who were captured were given ethnic Khitan women to marry from the Liao dynasty palace by the Jin, who had also defeated and conquered the Liao. The original Han wives of the Song princes were confiscated and replaced with Khitan ones. One of the Emperor Huizong of Song's sons was given a Khitan consort from the Liao palace, and another one of his sons was given a Khitan princess by the Jin at the Jin supreme capital. The Jurchens continued to give new wives to the captured Song royals, the grandsons and sons of the Emperor Huizong of Song after they took away their original ethnic Han wives. The Jin told the Song royals that they were fortunate because the Liao royals were being treated much worse by the Jin than the Song royals, Jin soldiers were given the children of the Emperor Tianzuo of Liao as gifts while the Song emperor was allowed to keep his children while he was in captivity.

=== Liao dynasty ===
The Liao dynasty arranged for women from the consort Xiao clan to marry members of the Han 韓 clan of ethnic Han descent, which originated in Jizhou 冀州 before being abducted by the Liao and becoming part of the ethnic Han elites of the Liao.

The Geng family of Han descent intermarried with the Khitans and the Han 韓 clan provided two of their women as wives to Geng Yanyi and the second one was the mother of Geng Zhixin. Empress Rende's sister, a member of the Xiao clan, was the mother of Han Chinese General Geng Yanyi.

Han Derang (Yelü Longyun) was the father of Queen dowager of the State of Chen, who was the wife of General Geng Yanyi and buried with him in his tomb in Zhaoyang in Liaoning. His wife was also known as "Madame Han". The Geng's tomb is located in Liaoning at Guyingzi in Chaoying.

=== Ganzhou Uyghur Kingdom ===
The Cao family of ethnic Han descent that ruled the Guiyi Circuit established marriage alliances with the Uighurs of the Ganzhou Kingdom, with both the Cao rulers marrying Uighur princesses and with Cao princesses marrying Uighur rulers. The Ganzhou Uighur Khagan's daughter was married to Cao Yijin in 916.

== Yuan dynasty ==
The Jin emperor Wanyan Yongji's daughter Princess Qiguo was married to Genghis Khan in exchange for relieving the Mongol siege upon Zhongdu (Beijing) in the Mongol conquest of the Jin dynasty.

The Emperor Gong of Song surrendered to the Yuan dynasty in 1276 and was married off to an ethnic Mongol princess of the imperial Borjigin family of the Yuan dynasty. Zhao Xian had one son with the Borjigin woman, Zhao Wanpu. Zhao Xian's son Zhao Wanpu was kept alive by the Yuan because of his mother's Borjigin ancestry even after Zhao Xian was ordered killed by the Emperor Yingzong of Yuan. Instead Zhao Wanpu was only moved and exiled. The outbreak of the Song loyalist Red Turban Rebellion in Henan led to a recommendation that Zhao Wanpu should be transferred somewhere else by an Imperial Censor in 1352. The Yuan did not want the ethnic Han rebels to get their hands on Zhao Wanpu so no one was permitted to see him and Zhao Wanpu's family and himself were exiled to Shazhou near the border by the Yuan emperor. Paul Pelliot and John Andrew Boyle commented on Rashid-al-Din Hamadani's chapter The Successors of Genghis Khan in his work Jami' al-tawarikh, identified references by Rashid al-Din to Zhao Xian in his book where he mentions a Chinese ruler who was an "emir" and son-in-law to the Qan (Khan) after being removed from his throne by the Mongols and he is also called "Monarch of Song", or "Suju" (宋主; Songzhu) in the book.

The King of Dali Duan Gong was married to the Borjigin princess Agai, daughter of the Yuan dynasty Prince of Liang, Basalawarmi. They had a son and a daughter, Duan Sengnu. their children were also called Duan Qiangna and Duan Bao. Duan Sengnu raised Duan Bao to take revenge against Basalawarmi for the killing of Duan Gong. A play was made based on these events. According to Yuan documents, the Duan family were originally ethnic Han from Wuwei commandery, Gansu. Other Duan families also originated from Wuwei.

== Ming dynasty ==
The Oirat leader Esen Taishi captured the Zhengtong Emperor of the Ming dynasty. Esen Taishi tried to force the Zhengtong Emperor to marry Esen's sister in a heqin marriage and then placing him back in Beijing with his new wife. The emperor rejected the marriage proposal.

A Mongol account in the Altan Tobchi said that Zhengtong Emperor had a son with an ethnic Mongol woman he married while he was prisoner.

A Mongol girl was given in marriage by the Gün-bilig-mergen Mongol Ordos leader Rinong (Jinong) to the ethnic Han officer of the Datong Army Wang Duo's son Wang San (王三) because Rinong wanted to hold on to Wang San and make him stay with the Mongols. The Ming arrested and executed Wang San in 1544 because Mongol soldiers were being guided by Wang San. Builders, carpenters, officers, and important prisoners such as the Ming Zhengtong Emperor often received ethnic Mongol wives.

== Qing dynasty ==
In the total span of the Qing dynasty, the number of ethnic Mongol grooms of Qing princesses was the largest. More than 58 percent of imperial sons-in-law were Mongols. A total of 32 princesses married Mongols but the majority of these were in the early Qing like Emperor Hong Taiji who married off 12 of his daughters to ethnic Mongol elites, when the Qing needed military support. In the early period of Qing, a large amount of intermarriage between the two groups happened, and the Qing rulers used this tie to gain the military support from the Mongol tribes. The marriage also benefited the Qing dynasty in expanding its empire into the Mongolian Plateau and further west into Inner Asia. The marriage between ethnic Manchu princesses and ethnic Mongol princes continued to the end of Qing dynasty, although becoming less prominent after the 18th century due to the decline of the Mongols' political and military influence within the empire and the Qing after 1770 totally ceased marrying princesses off to Northern and Western Mongols, only marrying them off to princes from the southern Mongols who voluntarily surrendered to them before the establishment of the Qing, who numbered 7 tribes and 13 banners since the locations they inhabited were vital to Qing security unlike the steppes of the Northern and Western Mongols since the wars between the Zunghars and Khalkhas was over. During the Qianlong reign in 1751 and Jiaqing reign in 1801, the Qing emperors deliberately issued decrees eliminating Mongols from potential grooms of Qing princesses and started replacing them with majority Manchu grooms. The Qing at this time no longer needed the support of Mongols and started marrying off their daughters to majority Manchu grooms instead of Mongols.

Ethnic Han generals who defected to the Qing early on were sometimes married to Qing princesses due to the desperate need of the Qing for military allies at that time and their use of marrying their women off to get them, although this is less frequent than the case where Aisin Gioro women married to ethnic Mongol aristocrats or other Manchu elites. Unlike the marriage between Manchus and southern Mongols that lasted throughout the Qing dynasty, the marriages between Qing princesses and ethnic Han generals ceased before 1750 as Qing rule was consolidated by then.

The Manchu imperial Aisin Gioro clan practiced marriage alliances with Ming generals of Han descent and Mongol princes. Aisin Gioro women were married to ethnic Han generals who defected to the Qing side during the Transition from Ming to Qing. The Later Jin leader Nurhaci married one of his granddaughters, a daughter of Abatai, to the Ming general Li Yongfang, the ancestor of Li Shiyao (李侍堯). The offspring of Li received the "Third Class Viscount" (三等子爵; sān děng zǐjué) title after he surrendered Fushun in Liaoning to the Manchu in 1618. A mass marriage of Han officers and officials to Manchu women numbering 1,000 couples was arranged by Prince Yoto 岳托 (Prince Keqin) and Hong Taiji in 1632 to promote harmony between the two ethnic groups. Aisin Gioro women were married to the sons of the Han generals Sun Sike (孫思克), Geng Jimao, Shang Kexi, and Wu Sangui.

The "Dolo efu" 和碩額駙 rank was given to husbands of Qing princesses. Geng Zhongming, a Han bannerman, was awarded the title of Prince Jingnan, and his son Geng Jingmao managed to have both his sons Geng Jingzhong and Geng Zhaozhong 耿昭忠 become court attendants under the Shunzhi Emperor and marry Aisin Gioro women, with Prince Abatai's granddaughter marrying Geng Zhaozhong 耿昭忠 and Haoge's (a son of Hong Taiji) daughter marrying Geng Jingzhong. A daughter 和硕柔嘉公主 of the Manchu Aisin Gioro Prince Yolo 岳樂 (Prince An) was wedded to Geng Juzhong who was another son of Geng Jingmao.

The 4th daughter of Kangxi (和硕悫靖公主) was wedded to the son (孫承恩) of Sun Sike (孫思克), an ethnic Han.

Imperial Duke Who Assists the State (宗室輔國公) Aisin Gioro Suyan's (蘇燕) daughter was married to Han Banner general Nian Gengyao. She was Manchu Prince Ajige's great-great-granddaughter.

Manchu Prince Aisin Gioro Yuntang's fourth daughter married the Han Bannerman Zhao Shiyang (趙世揚) in 1721. Manchu Prince Aisin Gioro Yunsi's first daughter married the Han Bannerman Sun Wufu (孫五福) in July/August 1724. Manchu Prince Aisin Gioro Yunzhi, Prince Zhi's second daughter married the Han Bannerman Li Shu'ao (李淑鰲) in September/October 1707 and his fourth daughter married the Han Bannerman Sun Cheng'en (孫承恩) in February/March 1710.

== Commentary ==
Heqin was controversial and had many critics. It was often adopted as an appeasement strategy with an enemy state that was too powerful to pacify on the battlefield and was not always effective. It implied an equal diplomatic status between two monarchs. The 20th-century scholar Wang Tonglin praised heqin for facilitating the "melting of races" in China.

== Similar practices outside of China ==
=== Vietnam ===
The Lý dynasty married its princesses off to chieftains of the local clans in the northern mountains and regional rivals to establish alliances with them. The Lý family married one of their princesses (Lý Chiêu Hoàng) to a member of the Trần (Chen 陈) clan, Trần Thái Tông. This then enabled the Trần to topple the Lý and establish their own Trần dynasty.

The Tran dynasty engaged in a similar practice, marrying Tran princesses to regional allies. Later, the Hồ family, which was also of Chinese origin, established the Hồ dynasty, taking power after having a Tran princess marry one of their members, Hồ Quý Ly. A Lý princess also married into the Ho family.

The Cambodian King Chey Chettha II married the Vietnamese Nguyễn lord Princess Nguyễn Thị Ngọc Vạn, a daughter of Lord Nguyễn Phúc Nguyên, in 1618. In return, the king granted the Vietnamese the right to establish settlements in Mô Xoài (now Bà Rịa), in the region of Prey Nokor—which they colloquially referred to as Sài Gòn, and which later became Ho Chi Minh City.

=== Korea ===
After the Qing invasion of Joseon, Joseon Korea was forced to give several of their princesses as concubines to the Qing Prince Regent Dorgon, an ethnic Manchu. In 1650, Dorgon married Princess Uisun (義順). She came from a collateral branch of the royal family, and was the daughter of Yi Gae-yun (李愷胤). Dorgon is said to have married two Korean princesses at Lianshan.

== See also ==
- Marriage in China
- Marriage of state, a similar practice in pre-modern Europe
- Marriage of convenience
- Malacca Sultanate
- Women in ancient and imperial China
