= Zhang Xinyi =

Chinese actress and director (born 1981)

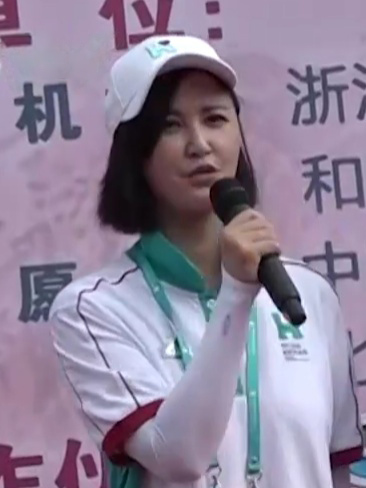
- Zhang in 2019
- Born: May 29, 1981 (age 45); Sichuan, China
- Education: Central Academy of Drama
- Occupations: Actress; Director
- Years active: 2007–present
- Agent: FWS
- Spouses: Yang Shupeng (m. 2013–2014) Yuan Hong (m. 2016)

Chinese name
- Simplified Chinese: 张歆艺
- Traditional Chinese: 張歆藝
Transcriptions
Standard Mandarin
- Hanyu Pinyin: Zhāng Xīnyì

Zhang Xinyi (Chinese: 张歆艺, born 29 May 1981) is a Chinese actress and director. She ranked 95th on Forbes China Celebrity 100 list in 2013, 99th in 2014, and 80th in 2015.

== Biography ==
Zhang was born in 1981 in Ziyang, Sichuan province. After graduating from the Central Academy of Drama in 2005 she became a dancer and joined the Shenzhen Song and Dance Ensemble.

After appearing in a number of small acting roles Zhang was cast in the 2012 television series Beijing Love Story which was popular and created a fan base for the actress. In 2017 Zhang made her directorial debut with an adaption of the animated comedy. Miss Puff in which she played the main character.

== Personal life ==
Zhang married Princess Jie You co-star Yuan Hong in Germany in May 2016.

== Filmography ==
=== Film ===
Year	English title	Chinese title	Role	Notes/Ref.
2007	The Longest Night in Shanghai	夜上海	Policewoman	Minor role
2009	Look for a Star	游龙戏凤	Shannon Fok	
2010	Lost on Journey	人在囧途	Beggar	
2012	An Inaccurate Memoir	匹夫	Jen	
2012	My Sassy Hubby	我老公不靠谱	Dong Yi	
2013	Stay Curious	好奇不滅		
2013	Meet Your True Self	遇见真实的自己		
2014	Uncle Victory	胜利	Sun Xiaomei	
2016	Everybody's Fine	一切都好	Cool girl	
2016	The New Year's Eve of Old Lee	过年好	Environmental worker	Cameo
2016	Spicy Hot in Love	爱情麻辣烫之情定终身	Yang Fei	
2018	Genghis Khan	战神纪		
2018	Miss Puff	泡芙小姐	Puff	also director
2019	Love Song to the Days Forgone	东北往事之二十年		
2021	Sunny Sisters	阳光姐妹淘	Huang Xiao Juan	
2021	All About My Mother	关于我妈的一切	Liu Mei	

=== Television series ===
Year	English title	Chinese title	Role	Notes
2005		风吹云动星不动	Lin Moqin	
2006	Night Rain	夜雨	Ye Zi	
2006	My Own Swordsman	武林外传	Xiao Qing	Cameo
2006	Life of Dragon and Tiger	龙虎人生	He Xuezhen	
2006	May Flower	五月的鲜花	Xie Yu	
2006		羊城暗哨	Dou Guan	
2007	We Have Nowhere to Place Youth	我们无处安放的青春	Du Xiaobin	
2007	Love is a Blessed Bullet	爱是一颗幸福的子弹	Wei Tiemin	
2008	Small House Important Events	小家大事	Song Yingying	
2009	Burning Rose	燃烧的玫瑰	Yang Lin	
2009	Lancet	柳叶刀	Xu Man	
2009	Sufei Confession	苏菲的供词	Su Fei	
2009	Shanghai Adventure	风雨上海滩	Du Qiuyue	
2010		风声传奇	Gu Xiaomeng	
2011	Take What to Save You, My Love	新拿什么拯救你，我的爱人	Luo Jingjing	
2011		红妆	Shen He	
2011		无影灯下	Wang Kaidi	
2011	A Live In Son In Law	新上门女婿	Zhong Hui	
2012	Beijing Love Story	北京爱情故事	Lin Xia	
2012	Love is Not Blind	失恋33天	Cat lady	Cameo
2012	Bachelor	大男当婚	Liu Chenxi	
2012	Amy Go	艾米加油	Xinyi	Cameo
2012	Be in Love After Marriage	先结婚后恋爱	Qiao Mai	
2013		大宅门1912	Lu Qingqing	
2013	The Husband's Spring	老公的春天	Mo Xiaoli	
2014	Three Bosom Girls	新闺蜜时代	Han Wenjing	
2014	The River Children	大河儿女	Sixth aunt	
2014	The Third Name of Love	绝爱	Zou Yu	
2015	Three Dads	三个奶爸	Tao Yutong	
2015	I Want To Fall In Love With You	好想好想爱上你	Xia Xiaoyun	
2016	Princess Jieyou	解忧公主	Princess Jieyou	
2016	Through the Mystery	穿越谜团	Wei Rong	
2016	Ice Fantasy	幻城	Lotus Spirit	Special appearance
2016	Happy Mitan	欢喜密探	Wild Flower	Cameo
2016	Let's Fall in Love	咱们相爱吧	Pan Zhizhi	
2018	Won't Let Go Of Your Hand	绝不松开你的手	Liu Yuan	
2018	She Is Beautiful	她很漂亮	Zhang Xiaona	
2025	Justifiable Defense	正当防卫	Lei Shuang	

== Discography ==
Year	English title	Chinese title	Album	Notes
2008	"Feel"	觉得	Small House Important Events OST	
2008	"The Happiness I Want"	我要的幸福	Small House Important Events OST	with various artists
2009	"Loneliness is Flying"	寂寞在飞翔	Night Rain OST	
2013	"Treasure Like This"	如此珍惜	—N/a	with Huang Zheng

== Awards and nominations ==
Year	Award	Category	Nominated work	Result	Ref.
2012	4th China Image Film Festival	Best Supporting Actress	An Inaccurate Memoir	Won	
2012	4th China TV Drama Awards	Rising Actress	—N/a	Won	
2014	6th China TV Drama Awards	Audience's Favorite Character	The River Children	Won	
2017	22nd Huading Awards	Best Actress (Ancient Drama)	Princess Jieyou	Nominated	
