= Lost, Found =

- Film poster
- Chinese: 找到你
- Hanyu Pinyin: Zhǎodào Nǐ
- Directed by: Lü Yue
- Written by: Qin Haiyan
- Produced by: Feng Xiaogang
- Starring: Yao Chen; Ma Yili; Yuan Wenkang; Wu Haochen
- Cinematography: Chengma Zhiyuan
- Edited by: Zhang Yifan
- Music by: An Wei
- Production companies: Huayi Brothers; Shanghai Film Group
- Distributed by: CMC Pictures
- Release date: 5 October 2018 (China)
- Running time: 102 minutes
- Country: China
- Language: Mandarin (with English subtitle)

Lost, Found (Chinese: 找到你) is a 2018 Chinese drama film directed by Lü Yue and produced by Feng Xiaogang. The film stars Yao Chen, Ma Yili, Yuan Wenkang, and Wu Haochen. It is a remake of 2016 South Korean film Missing. The film premiered at the 21st Shanghai International Film Festival on 17 June 2018, and opened in China on 5 October 2018.

== Plot ==
The daughter of female lawyer Li Jie is missing. The missing nanny Sun Fang is the one who took the child away. Li Jie and her family try every means to find Sun Fang and her daughter, and finally discover Sun Fang's secret and the reason why she took the child away.

== Cast ==
- Yao Chen as Li Jie, a middle-class lawyer who has a daughter.
- Ma Yili as Sun Fang, a nanny who works in Li Jie's home, taking care of her daughter.
- Yuan Wenkang as Tian Ning, Li Jie's former husband.
- Wu Haochen as Zhang Bo
- Wang Zichen
- Gao Ye
- Qi Xiang
- Tao Xinran
- Yuan Jing
- Yu Zhenhui
- Xu Bozhan

== Cast list ==
=== Main cast ===
Actor name	Character name	Introduction
Yao Chen	Li Jie	
Ma Yili	Sun Fang	

=== Other cast ===
Actor name	Character name	Introduction
Yuan Wenkang	Tian Ning	
Wu Haochen	Zhang Bo	
Wang Zichen	Hong Jiabao	
Gao Ye	Xiaolu	
Qi Huan	Xu Lan	
Tao Xinran	Zhu Min	

== Movie Songs ==
No.	Title	Singing	Length
1.	"For You" (Theme Song of Girlfriends)	Yao Chen, Ma Yili
2.	"Find You" (Theme Song of the Same Name)	Li Jianqing

== Production ==
The film marks Lǚ Yue's sixth film as a director.

== Release ==
Lost, Found premiered at the 21st Shanghai International Film Festival on 17 June 2018 with wide-release in China on 5 October 2018.

== Accolades ==
Date	Award	Category	Recipient(s) and nominee(s)	Result	Notes
2018	21st Shanghai International Film Festival	Best Film	Lost, Found	Nominated	
