= Assembly (film) =

2007 Chinese-Hong Kong-South Korean film by Feng Xiaogang

- Theatrical release poster

Chinese name
- Traditional Chinese: 集結號
- Simplified Chinese: 集结号
- Literal meaning: Order to Assemble
Transcriptions
Standard Mandarin
- Hanyu Pinyin: jíjié hào
- Directed by: Feng Xiaogang
- Written by: Liu Heng
- Produced by: John Chong; Feng Xiaogang; Wang Zhongjun; Guan Yadi
- Starring: Zhang Hanyu; Deng Chao; Yuan Wenkang; Tang Yan; Wang Baoqiang; Liao Fan; Hu Jun; Ren Quan; Li Naiwen
- Cinematography: Lü Yue
- Edited by: Liu Miaomiao
- Music by: Wang Liguang
- Production companies: China Film Co-Production Corporation; Huayi Brothers; Shanghai Film Group; Media Asia Films; Myung Films
- Distributed by: China Film Group (China); Media Asia Distribution Ltd. (Hong Kong); Cinema Service (South Korea)
- Release dates: 20 December 2007 (China); 3 January 2008 (Hong Kong); 6 March 2008 (South Korea)
- Running time: 124 minutes
- Countries: China; Hong Kong; South Korea
- Language: Mandarin
- Budget: US$16,000,000 (estimated)
- Box office: $35 million (¥260 million)

Assembly is a 2007 war film written by Liu Heng and directed by Feng Xiaogang. A co-production between China, Hong Kong and South Korea, the film starred Zhang Hanyu, Deng Chao, Yuan Wenkang, Tang Yan, Wang Baoqiang, Liao Fan, Hu Jun, Ren Quan and Li Naiwen. The film, ostensibly portraying an anti-war theme, was first released on 20 December 2007. It won the 2008 Hundred Flowers Awards and the 2009 Golden Rooster Awards for Best Film.

== Plot ==
In 1948, during the Huaihai Campaign of the Chinese Civil War, Captain Gu Zidi leads the 9th Company of the 139th Regiment of the People's Liberation Army (PLA) to capture a town controlled by the National Revolutionary Army (NRA), during which they sustain heavy casualties from intense enemy firepower. Angered by the death of his political commissar, Gu attempts to execute the NRA soldiers who surrendered. As a result, he is thrown in jail for three days by his superior, Colonel Liu Zeshui. In jail, he befriends Wang Jincun, a foot soldier and former teacher who has been jailed for cowardice.

Upon his release, Gu and his 46 surviving men are sent to defend a coal mine on the bank of the Wen River near Tai'an, Shandong. They are ordered to hold their positions until they hear a bugle call for assembly. With Liu's permission, Wang, being the most educated man in the company, becomes the 9th Company's new political commissar. Almost immediately after fortifying their position, the 9th Company comes under heavy attack by NRA forces. After fending off a wave of enemy infantry and supporting armour and subsequently destroying two enemy tanks, the 9th Company is left with only a handful of men. At this point, some soldiers claim to hear the bugle call in the distance. Gu, who has been temporarily deafened by an explosion, refuses to believe them and orders them to fight to the death. The entire 9th Company is killed except Gu, who is knocked unconscious by a tank shell.

PLA forces eventually recapture the area and find Gu, unconscious and heavily wounded, while wearing a NRA uniform he had stolen when he was trapped behind enemy lines. At a military hospital, Gu tries to explain that he is a PLA captain and that, after being knocked unconscious, he had awakened and pretended to be a NRA soldier in order to steal food nearby, and then bombed an enemy fuel depot before falling unconscious again. However, as the PLA has undergone a reorganisation while Gu was in a coma, no one remembers the existence of the 139th Regiment, whose members have apparently all perished, so Gu is unable to confirm his identity. The other patients in the hospital, thinking that he is a deserter, scorn him.

In 1950, when China enters the Korean War, Gu volunteers to fight as a foot soldier in the People's Volunteer Army (PVA). During an artillery spotting mission, in which Gu and his team disguise themselves as soldiers of the Republic of Korea Army's 6th Infantry Division, Gu risks his life to save his unit commander, Lieutenant Zhao Erdou, after the latter accidentally steps on an anti-personnel landmine. While Zhao proceeds with his assigned task, Gu, still holding down the landmine, manages to escape but loses his right eye in the ensuing blast. The two of them become close friends and Zhao supports Gu's attempts to regain recognition for the 9th Company.

After the war, Gu returns to the Wen River battlefield and tries to locate the mine where the battle was fought. He is disappointed to see that the mine has resumed operating and that the old entrance has been buried underneath piles of coal. He also encounters Wang's widow and convinces her to marry Zhao. As time passes, Zhao discovers the location of the tomb of Colonel Liu Zeshui, the 139th Regiment's commander. Gu visits the tomb and learns that the caretaker is Liu's former assistant who has survived the war but lost an arm. The caretaker confirms that the bugle call was never sounded because the 9th Company was deliberately sacrificed to buy time for the rest of the regiment. After hearing that, Gu flies into a rage and curses Liu but calms down later.

Gu starts camping at the mine and attempts to dig out his men's bodies with a shovel despite protests from the miners. A month later, a surviving former officer of the 139th Regiment, after hearing of Gu's actions, comes forward to verify the deeds of the 139th Regiment, specifically the 9th Company. The PLA then sends an official notice to the local government to honour the 9th Company. However, Gu remains inconsolable because he cannot find the remaining bodies. At this point, he experiences a flashback which reveals that, as enemy forces closed in, he and Wang had buried the bodies of the others deep inside the mine. While Gu had gone out to continue fighting, a mortally wounded Wang had blown up the entrance to prevent the enemy from capturing the bodies, killing himself in the process.

Years later, the remains of the other soldiers are found during an excavation for an irrigation project. The PLA erects a monument near the site and conducts a military funeral with full honours for the fallen men of the 9th Company. Gu finally finds peace. The ending titles say that Gu died in 1987 at the age of 71. He was abandoned by his parents when he was three months' old due to famine in his hometown and was subsequently found by a shoemaker in a millet field. He was named Gu Zidi, which literally means millet field.

== Cast ==
- Zhang Hanyu as Captain Gu Zidi, the commander of the 9th Company.
- Deng Chao as Lieutenant Zhao Erdou, an artillery battalion commander who befriends Gu Zidi.
- Yuan Wenkang as Wang Jincun, the political commissar of the 9th Company.
- Tang Yan as Sun Guiqin, Wang Jincun's widow who remarried Zhao Erdou.
- Liao Fan as Lieutenant Jiao Dapeng, the commander of the 1st Platoon of the 9th Company.
- Wang Baoqiang as Jiang Maocai, a sniper in the 9th Company.
- Hu Jun as Colonel Liu Zeshui, the commander of the 139th Regiment.
- Ren Quan as the original political commissar of the 9th Company who was killed at the beginning of the film.
- Li Naiwen as Lü Kuangou, a soldier in the 9th Company.
- Fu Heng as Luo Guangtian, a soldier in the 9th Company.
- Zhao Shaokang as "Old Hedgehog", a soldier in the 9th Company.
- Hu Ming as Xiaoliangzi, the bugler in the 139th Regiment.

== Production ==
The action and effects team from the 2004 Korean war film Taegukgi were employed to work on Assembly. Assembly is also among the first films produced in mainland China to portray the Chinese Civil War in a realistic style. The film is also adapted from the novel Guan Si (A Legal Case), which is based on a real-life account of a veteran army captain upholding his company's honour.

== Critical reception ==
The film was a massive box office success, particularly in mainland China.

Perry Lam gave a mixed review of Assembly in the Hong Kong magazine Muse: "There is a huge discrepancy between the sophistication of the filmmakers in their knowledge and application of state-of-the-art techniques, and the naivety and bad faith they place in the value of unquestioning obedience to authority and sacrifice as the highest manifestation of patriotism."

Kozo, who reviewed the film at the Hong Kong Asian Film Festival 2007, felt that Assembly is a safe commercial movie that does not offend anybody: "In Assembly, war is never really portrayed as a 'cause'. The human element is the main focus here, and the sacrifices made by soldiers are to be honoured because they're people, and not members of one side or the other."

== Sequel ==
Assembly was quickly followed by a sequel, Assembly 2: The Cold Flame, which was directed by Leon Yang. Although it also featured Zhang Hanyu in a leading role, it was shot in 2005 and held back by the studio. It was eventually released to capitalise on the success of Assembly. The sequel centres on the relationship between a wounded NRA soldier and an orphaned girl during the Second Sino-Japanese War instead of the Chinese Civil War. It contains very few war scenes and focuses more on the personal drama between the characters.

== Awards and nominations ==
45th Golden Horse Awards

- Won: Best Actor (Zhang Hanyu)
- Won: Best Adapted Screenplay (Liu Heng)
- Nominated: Best Feature Film
- Nominated: Best Visual Effects
- Nominated: Best Action Choreography
- Nominated: Best Sound Effects

2008 Hundred Flowers Awards

- Won: Best Film

2009 Golden Rooster Awards

- Won: Best Film
- Won: Best Film Director
- Won: Best Cinematography
- Won: Best Original Music Score

11th Pyongyang International Film Festival

- Won: Best Picture
- Won: Best Director
