= Sishui Kingdom =

Kingdom of China's Han dynasty located in northern Jiangsu

Sishui Kingdom (Chinese: 泗水國) was a kingdom of China's Han dynasty, located in what is now northern Jiangsu province.

The kingdom was established in 113 BC. Its territories consisted of several counties formerly belonging to the Donghai Commandery. Emperor Wu enfeoffed Liu Shang (劉商), nephew of the emperor and son of Liu Shun (劉舜), King of Changshan, to Sishui. Liu Shang's lineage ruled Sishui for the rest of the Western Han period:

- Liu Shang (劉商), King Si (思) of Sishui, 113–103 BC;
- Liu Anshi (劉安世), King Ai (哀) of Sishui, 103–102 BC;
- Liu He (劉賀), King Dai (戴) of Sishui, 102–80 BC;
- Liu Xuan (劉煖), King Qin (勤) of Sishui, 80–41 BC;
- Liu Jun (劉駿), King Li (戾) of Sishui, 41–10 BC;
- Liu Jing (劉靖), deposed during Wang Mang's usurpation.

After the restoration of the Han dynasty, Sishui was granted to Liu She (劉歙), one of the close associates of the Emperor Guangwu. After Liu She's death, Sishui was merged into Guangling Commandery.

In late Western Han, the kingdom administered 3 counties: Ling (淩), Siyang (泗陽) and Yu (于). The total population was 119,114 individuals or 25,025 households.
