= Invisible Wings =

- Film poster for Invisible Wings for the Chinese release
- Directed by: Feng Zhenzhi
- Written by: Feng Zhenzhi; Zhao Huili; Gu Tianyang
- Starring: Lei Qingyao
- Cinematography: Jiang Xiujia; Hai Tao
- Distributed by: Joyous Media
- Release date: 6 September 2007
- Running time: 93 minutes
- Country: China
- Language: Mandarin

Invisible Wings (Chinese: 隐形的翅膀; pinyin: yǐn xíng de chì bǎng) is a 2007 Chinese film directed by Feng Zhenzhi and starring the amputee Lei Qingyao.

== Plot ==
A teenage girl, Zhi Hua (Lei Qingyao), loses both her arms to an electric shock while recovering a kite from the electric wires. Distraught, she attempts to end her life but eventually finds a new will to live. She goes on to train her feet to do everything, such as writing, cooking, changing clothes and even making kites. She aspires to become a doctor but is denied admission and this makes her even more determined. She begins to train to become a swimming champion, beating all Olympic-level participants. She eventually goes on to become a national champion in swimming.

== Reception ==
The film has mainly screened at speciality festivals, such as the International Children's Film Festival held in Hyderabad, where it won the Golden Elephant award for best film. It has also been released more widely in several markets, including southern India where it was translated into Telugu. In China, the film was well received, and Qingyao was awarded the Best New Artist Huabiao award for her performance and Best Newcomer Hundred Flowers Awards.
