= Princess Jieyou =

Chinese princess

Princess Jieyou (Chinese: 解忧公主; pinyin: Jiěyōu Gōngzhǔ; Wade–Giles: Chieh-yu Kung-chu; 121 BC – 49 BC), born Liu Jieyou (Chinese: 刘解忧), was a Chinese princess sent to marry the leader of the Wusun kingdom as part of the Western Han Chinese policy of heqin.

== Biography ==
As the granddaughter of the disgraced Prince Liu Wu (劉戊) who had taken part in the disastrous Rebellion of the Seven States, her status was low enough that she was sent to replace Princess Liu Xijun (劉細君) after her untimely death and marry the Wusun king Cunzhou (岑陬). After his death, she married his cousin and successor, Wengguimi (翁歸靡), to whom she bore five children including Yuanguimi (元貴靡).

Jieyou lived among the Wusun for fifty years and did much work to foster relations between the surrounding kingdoms and the Han. She was particularly reliant upon her attendant, Feng Liao, whom she dispatched as an emissary to Wusun kingdoms and even to the Han Court. She faced opposition from pro-Xiongnu members of the Wusun royalty, particularly Wengguimi’s Xiongnu wife. When word came that the Xiongnu planned to attack Wusun, she convinced her husband to send for aid from the Han Emperor. Emperor Wu of Han sent 150,000 cavalrymen to support the Wusun forces and drive back the Xiongnu.

When Wengguimi died, Jieyou married Nimi (泥靡), also known as the Mad King. While they had a son, Chi Mi (鴟靡), their relationship was unhappy. She soon conspired with several Han emissaries to have him assassinated, but the assassination attempt failed and Jieyou was nearly killed by his supporters in retaliation. In the end, Nimi was killed by Wengguimi’s son, Wujiutu (烏就屠) who, upon negotiating with Feng Liao, agreed to co-rule with Jieyou’s son, Yuanguimi.

In 51 BCE at the age of 70, Jieyou asked to be allowed to retire and return to the Han. Emperor Xuan of Han agreed and had her escorted back to Chang'an where she was welcomed with honor. She was given a grand palace with servants usually reserved for princesses of the imperial family. In 49 BCE, Jieyou died peacefully.
