= Mr. Zhao =

- DVD cover
- Traditional Chinese: 趙先生
- Simplified Chinese: 赵先生
- Literal meaning: Teacher Zhao
- Hanyu Pinyin: Zhào xiānshēng
- Directed by: Lü Yue
- Written by: Lü Yue; Shu Ping
- Produced by: Yang Hongguang; Liu Xiaodian
- Starring: Shi Jingming; Chen Yinan; Zhang Zhihua
- Cinematography: Wang Tianlin
- Edited by: Zhai Rui
- Music by: Wu Gang
- Release date: 15 August 1998 (Locarno)
- Running time: 89 minutes
- Country: China
- Language: Mandarin

Mr. Zhao is a 1998 Chinese dark comedy film. It is the directorial debut of Lü Yue, already a well-established cinematographer for director Zhang Yimou.

Mr. Zhao tells the story of a philandering doctor living in Shanghai. His infidelity gets the best of him, however, when his mistress Tian Jing (Chen Yinan) announces she is pregnant, while his wife learns of his affair but refuses to grant a divorce.

== Cast ==
- Shi Jingming as the titular Mr. Zhao, a teacher of Chinese medicine.
- Zhang Zhihua as his wife, a factory worker.
- Chen Yinan as Tian Jing, his student and now pregnant mistress.

== Reception ==
Mr. Zhao won the 1998 Golden Leopard at the Locarno International Film Festival in Switzerland.

The film was also entered into competition at the 1999 Hong Kong International Film Festival and the 1998 AFI Fest in Los Angeles.
