= Wusun =

Ancient semi-nomadic people in Central Asia

烏孫
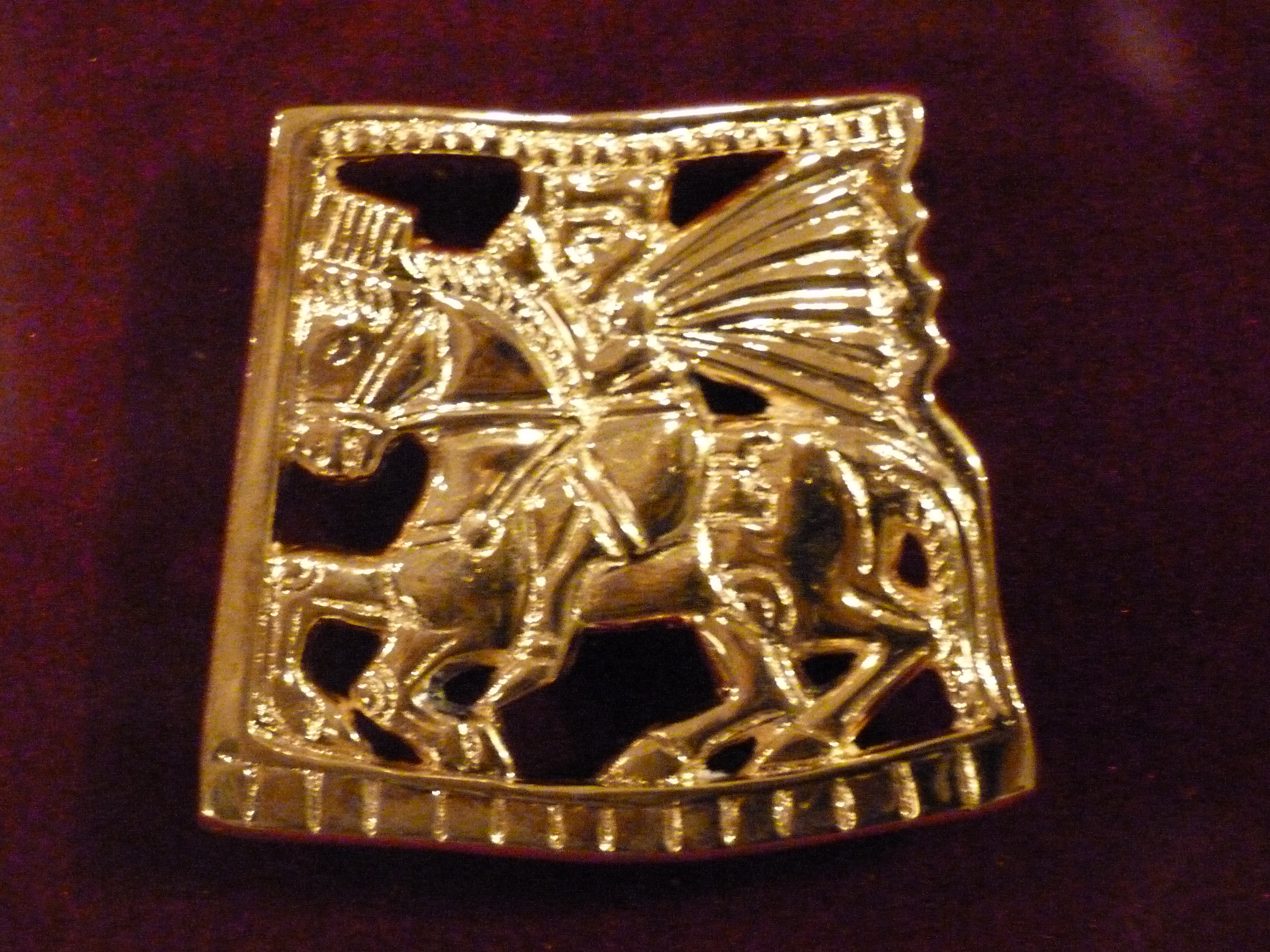
- Rider burial mound at Tenlik Kurgan, in eastern Zhetysu (III.-II. B.C.) The Tenlik kurgan is associated with the Wusun. The Wusun and neighbouring polities circa 200 BC, before their westward migration

Regions with significant populations

The Wusun (/ˈwuːsʌn/ WOO-sun) (Note: Chinese pronunciation: [wúswə́n]; simplified Chinese: 乌孙; traditional Chinese: 烏孫; pinyin: Wūsūn; Eastern Han Chinese *ʔɑ-suən < Old Chinese (140 BC – 436 AD): *Ɂâ-sûn)) were an ancient semi-nomadic steppe people mentioned in Chinese records from the 2nd century BC to the 5th century AD.

The Wusun originally lived between the Qilian Mountains and Dunhuang (Gansu) near the Yuezhi. Around 176 BC the Xiongnu raided the lands of the Yuezhi, who subsequently attacked the Wusun, killing their king and seizing their land. The Xiongnu adopted the surviving Wusun prince and made him one of their generals and leader of the Wusun. Around 162 BC the Yuezhi were driven into the Ili River Valley in Zhetysu, Dzungaria and Tian Shan, which had formerly been inhabited by the Saka. The Wusun then resettled in Gansu as vassals of the Xiongnu. In 133–132 BC, the Wusun drove the Yuezhi out of the Ili Valley and settled the area.

The Wusun then became close allies of the Han dynasty and remained a powerful force in the region for several centuries. The Wusun are last mentioned by the Chinese as having settled in the Pamir Mountains in the 5th century AD due to pressure from the Rouran. They possibly became subsumed into the later Hephthalites.

== Etymology ==
Wusun is a modern pronunciation of the Chinese Characters '烏孫'. The Chinese name '烏孫' (Wūsūn) literally means wū 'crow, raven' + sūn 'grandson, descendant'.

There are several theories about the origin of the name:

- Canadian Sinologist Edwin Pulleyblank reconstructs the pronunciation of '烏孫' Wūsūn as in Middle Chinese as ou-suən, from Old Chinese aĥ-smən and linked the Wusun to the Άσμίραιοι Asmiraioi, who inhabited modern Issyk-Kul and Semirechiye and were mentioned in Ptolemy's Geography (VI.16.3).
- Several scholars (e.g. Hudson, Bernshtam, Hambly, Lindegger) link them to the Issedones.
- Sinologist Victor H. Mair compared Wusun with Sanskrit áśva 'horse', aśvin 'mare' and Lithuanian ašvà 'mare'. The name would thus mean 'the horse people'. Hence he put forward the hypothesis that the Wusun used a satem-like language within the Indo-European languages. However, the latter hypothesis is not supported by Edwin G. Pulleyblank. Christopher I. Beckwith's analysis is similar to Mair's, reconstructing the Chinese term Wusun as Old Chinese *âswin, which he compares to Old Indic aśvin 'the horsemen', the name of the Rigvedic twin equestrian gods.
- Étienne de la Vaissière identifies the Wusun with the wδ'nn'p, mentioned on Kultobe inscriptions as enemies of the Sogdian-speaking Kangju confederation. Wδ'nn'p contains two morphemes n'p "people" and *wδ'n [wiðan], which is cognate with Manichaean Parthian wd'n and means "tent". Vaissière hypothesizes that the Wusun likely spoke an Iranian language closely related to Sogdian, permitting Sogdians to translate their endonym as *wδ'n [wiðan] and Chinese to transcribe their endonym with a native Chinese /s/ standing for a foreign dental fricative. Therefore, Vaissière reconstructs Wusun's endonym as *Wəθan "[People of the] Tent(s)".

== History ==
=== Early history ===
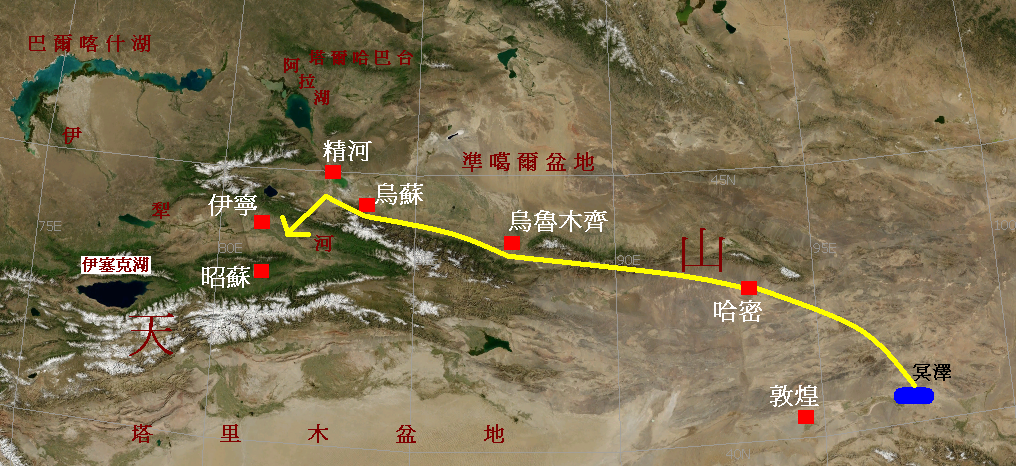
Migration of the Wusun

The Wusun were first mentioned by Chinese sources as living together with the Yuezhi between the Qilian Mountains and Dunhuang (Gansu). although different locations have been suggested for these toponyms.

Around 210–200 BC, prince Modu Chanyu, a former hostage of the Yuezhi and prince of the Xiongnu, who were also vassals of the Yuezhi, became leader of the Xiongnu and conquered the Mongolian Plain, subjugating several peoples. Around 176 BC Modu Chanyu launched a fierce raid against the Yuezhi. Around 173 BC, the Yuezhi subsequently attacked the Wusun, at that time a small nation, killing their king Nandoumi.

According to legend Nandoumi's infant son Liejiaomi was left in the wild. He was miraculously saved from hunger being suckled by a she-wolf, and fed meat by ravens. The Wusun ancestor myth shares striking similarities with those of the Hittites, the Zhou Chinese, the Scythians, the Romans, the Goguryeo, Turks, Mongols and Dzungars. Based on the similarities between the ancestor myth of the Wusun and later Turkic peoples, Denis Sinor has suggested that the Wusun, Sogdians, or both could represent an Indo-Aryan influence, or even the origin of the royal Ashina Türks.

In 162 BC, the Yuezhi were finally defeated by the Xiongnu, after which they fled Gansu. According to Zhang Qian, the Yuezhi were defeated by the rising Xiongnu empire and fled westward, driving away the Sai (Scythians) from the Ili Valley in the Zhetysu and Dzungaria area. The Sai would subsequently migrate into South Asia, where they founded various Indo-Scythian kingdoms. After the Yuezhi retreat the Wusun subsequently settled the modern province of Gansu, in the valley of the Wushui-he (lit. 'Raven-Water River'), as vassals of the Xiongnu. It is not clear whether the river was named after the tribe or vice versa.

=== Migration to the Ili Valley ===
The Xiongnu ruler was impressed with Liejiaomi, considering him a supernatural being, and adopted the child. When the child grew up the Chanyu made him leader of the Wusun and a Xiongnu general. He won many victories for the Xiongnu and the Wusun became powerful. Liejiaomi constantly requested the Xiongnu ruler for permission to avenge his father, and around 133–132 BC, he successfully attacked the Yuezhi in the Ili Valley. The Yuezhi then migrated to Sogdia and then Bactria, where they became unified under Kujula Kadphises and expanded into South Asia, founding the Kushan Empire, which at its peak under Kanishka stretched from Turpan in the Tarim Basin to Pataliputra on the Gangetic plain and played an important role in the development of the Silk Road and the transmission of Buddhism to China.

The Wusun subsequently took over the Ili Valley, expanding over a large area and trying to keep away from the Xiongnu. According to the Shiji, Wusun was a state located west of the Xiongnu. When the Xiongnu ruler died, Liejiaomi refused to serve the Xiongnu. The Xiongnu then sent a force against the Wusun but were defeated, after which the Xiongnu considered Liejiaomi a supernatural being even more than before and avoided conflict with him.

=== Establishing relations with the Han ===
Later location of the Wusun after their migration to the Ili Valley, at the time of the Han princess Xijun

After settling in the Ili Valley the Wusun became so strong that the Han were compelled to win their friendship in alliance. Chinese sources name the Scythian Sai (Saka), and the Yuezhi who were often have identified with Tocharians in the past, among the people of the Wusun state in the Zhetysu and Dzungaria area. The Wusun realm probably included both Yuezhi and Saka. It is clear that the majority of the population consisted of linguistically Iranian Saka tribes.

In 125 BC, under the Han emperor Wu of Han (156–87 BC), the Chinese traveller and diplomat Zhang Qian was sent to establish an alliance with the Wusun against the Xiongnu. Qian estimated the Wusun to number 630,000, with 120,000 families and 188,000 men capable of bearing arms. The Book of Han described them as occupying land that previously belonged to the Saka (Sai). To their north-west the Wusun bordered Kangju, in modern Kazakhstan. To the west was Dayuan (Ferghana), and to the south were various city states. The Royal Court of the Wusun, the walled city of Chigu, was located in a side valley leading to Issyk Kul. Lying on one of the branches of the Silk Road Chigu was an important trading centre, but its exact location has not been established.

According to Sima Qian in the Shiji:

Wusun as a nation, has its great Kunmi [monarch] presiding at Chigu City which is 8900 li [3700km] away from Chang'an (...) It land is bare and flat, rainy and chilly. Its hills are covered with pines. Its people do not plow of plant but follow their flocks to where water and grass are found. Its customs are similar to those of the Xiongnu. The nation has plenty of horses... and its people violent, greedy and not trustworthy. There are abundant bandits and thieves. Its territories originally belonged to the Sakas, the latter king went south to Bolor (Baltistan) whereby the Yuezhi took over and settled on the land. (...) Later, when the Yuezhi moved west to subjugate Bactria, the Wusun Kunmo replaced them and lived there. For that reason, the Wusun population is admixed with Sakas and Yuezhi peoples.

— Sima Qian, Shiji

The Wusun approved of a possible alliance, and Zhang Qian was sent as ambassador in 115 BC. According to the agreement the Wusun would jointly attack the Xiongnu with the Han, while they were offered a Han princess in marriage and the return of their original Gansu homeland (heqin). However, due to fear of the Xiongnu, the Wusun had second thoughts and suggested sending a delegation to the Han rather than moving their capital further west.

=== As Han allies ===
Some time after the Han-Wusun negotiations ended, the Han inflicted several blows to the Xiongnu. The Han then threatened war upon the Wusun, after which Liejiaomi finally agreed to an alliance, sending tributary horses and accepting Princess Xijun as his wife. Along with the Yuezhi and the Kangju of the Ferghana Valley, the Wusun became the main suppliers of horses for the Han. The Xiongnu had however also sent a princess to marry Liejiaomi, and the Xiongnu princess was declared his senior consort, with Xijun becoming his junior wife. Since Liejiaomi was already an old man, Xijun was married to his successor Cenzou, which Wu agreed with. Xijun wrote a famous poem, the Beichouge, in which she complains about her exile in the land of the "barbarians":

My family sent me off to be married on the other side of heaven. They sent me a long way to a strange land, to the king of Wusun. A domed lodging is my dwelling place with walls of felt. Meat is my food, with fermented milk as the sauce. I live with constant thoughts of my home, my heart is full of sorrow. I wish I were a golden swan, returning to my home country.

Xijun bore the Wusun a daughter but died soon afterward, at which point the Han court sent Princess Jieyou to succeed her. After the death of Cenzou, Jieyou married Wengguimi, Cenzou's cousin and successor. Jieyou lived for fifty years among the Wusun and bore five children, including the oldest Yuanguimi, whose half-brother Wujiutu was born to a Xiongnu mother. She sent numerous letters to the Han requesting assistance against the Xiongnu.

Around 80 BC, the Wusun were attacked by the Xiongnu, who inflicted a devastating defeat upon them. In 72 BC, Kunmi, chief of the Wusun requested assistance from the Han against the Xiongnu. The Han sent an army of 160,000 men, inflicting a crushing defeat upon the Xiongnu, capturing much booty and many slaves. In the campaign the Han captured the Tarim Basin and the city-state of Cheshi (Turpan region), a previous ally of the Xiongnu, giving them direct contact with the Wusun. Afterwards the Wusun allied with the Dingling and Wuhuan to counter Xiongnu attacks. After their crushing victory against the Xiongnu the Wusun increased in strength, achieving significant influence over the city-states of the Tarim Basin. The son of the Kunmi became the ruler of Yarkand, while his daughter became the wife of the lord of Kucha. They came to play a role as a third force between the Han and the Xiongnu.

Around 64 BC, according to the Book of Han, Chinese agents were involved in a plot with a Wusun kunmi known as Wengguimi ("Fat King") and to kill a Wusun kunmi known to the Chinese as Nimi ("Mad King"). A Chinese deputy envoy called Chi Tu who brought a doctor to attend to Nimi was punished with castration by the Han dynasty when he returned to China for treating the mad king's illness instead of killing him which the Han court ordered them to do.

In 64 BC another Han princess was sent to Kunmi Wengguimi, but he died before her arrival. Han emperor Xuan then permitted the princess to return, since Jieyou had married the new Kunmi, Nimi, the son of Cenzou. Jieyou bore Nimi the son Chimi. Prince Wujiutu later killed Nimi, his half-brother. Fearing the wrath of the Han, Wujiutu adopted the title of Lesser Kunmi, while Yuanguimi was given the title Greater Kunmi. The Han accepted this system and bestowed both of them with the imperial seal. After both Yuanguimi and Chimi were dead, Jieyou asked Emperor Xuan for permission to return to China. She died in 49 BC. Over the next decades the institution of the Greater and Lesser Kunmi continued, with the Lesser Kunmi being married to a Xiongnu princess and the Greater Kunmi married to a Han princess.

In 5 BC, during the reign of Wuzhuliu Chanyu (8 BC – AD 13), the Wusun attempted to raid Yueban pastures, but Wuzhuliu repulsed them, and the Wusun commander had to send his son to the Yueban court as a hostage. The forceful intervention of the Chinese usurper Wang Mang and internal strife brought disorder, and in 2 BC one of the Wusun chieftains brought 80,000 Wusun to Kangju, asking for help against the Chinese. In a vain attempt to reconcile with China, he was duped and killed in 3 AD.

In 2 AD, Wang Mang issued a list of four regulations to the allied Xiongnu that the taking of any hostages from Chinese vassals, i.e. Wusun, Wuhuan and the statelets of the Western Regions, would not be tolerated.

In 74 AD the Wusun are recorded as having sent tribute to the Han military commanders in Cheshi. In 80 AD Ban Chao requested assistance from the Wusun against the city-state Quchi (Kucha) in the Tarim Basin. The Wusun were subsequently rewarded with silks, while diplomatic exchanges were resumed. During the 2nd century AD the Wusun continued their decline in political importance.

=== Later history ===
In the 5th century AD the Wusun were pressured by the Rouran and may have migrated to the Pamir Mountains. They are last mentioned in Chinese historical sources in 436 AD, when a Chinese envoy was sent to their country and the Wusun reciprocated. It is possible that they became subsumed into the later Hephthalites. After this event the Wusun seem to disappear from Chinese records: the Wusun were last mentioned in 938 AD alongside Tuyuhun and Mohe, as tributary states to the Khitan Liao.

== Physical appearance ==
A Chinese depiction of the Wusun, from Gujin Tushu Jicheng, 18th century.

The Book of Han and Shiji do not make any special note of the physical appearance of the Wusun. The first description of the Wusun's physical appearance is found in a Western Han dynasty book of divination, the Forest of Changes by Jiaoshi Yilin, which describes the women of the Wusun as "with deep eyesockets, dark, ugly: their preferences are different, past their prime [still] without spouse." A later 7th century commentary to the Book of Han by Yan Shigu says:

Among the barbarians (戎; Róng) in the Western Regions, the look of the Wusun is the most unusual. The present barbarians (胡人; húrén) who have green eyes and red hair, and look like macaque monkeys, are the offspring of this people.

Initially, when only a few number of skulls from Wusun territory were known, the Wusun were recognized as a Caucasoid people with slight Mongoloid admixture. Later, in a more thorough study by Soviet archaeologists of eighty-seven skulls of Zhetysu, the six skulls of the Wusun period were determined to be purely Caucasoid or close to it.

== Language ==
The Wusun are generally believed to be an Indo-European people and speak a language belonging to the Indo-Iranian branch. They are thought to be Iranian-speaking by the archaeologist Elena Kuzmina, linguist János Harmatta, Joseph Kitagawa, David Durand-Guédy, Turkologist Peter B. Golden and Central Asian scholar Denis Sinor. Yan Shigu (581–645) described the Wusun's descendants with the exonym 胡人 Húrén "foreigners, barbarians", which had been used since the 6th century to denote Iranian peoples, especially Sogdians, in Central Asia, besides other non-Chinese peoples. Archaeological evidence also supports the idea that Wusuns were Iranian speakers.

Edwin G. Pulleyblank has suggested that the Wusun, along with the Yuezhi, the Dayuan, the Kangju and the people of Yanqi, could have been Tocharian-speaking. Colin Masica and David Keightley also suggest that the Wusun were Tocharian-speaking. Sinor found it difficult to include the Wusun within the Tocharian category of Indo-European until further research was done. J. P. Mallory has suggested that the Wusun contained both Tocharian and Iranian elements. Central Asian scholar Christopher I. Beckwith suggests that the Wusun were Indo-Aryan-speaking. The first syllable of the Wusun royal title Kunmi was probably the royal title while the second syllable referred to the royal family name. Beckwith specifically suggests an Indo-Aryan etymology of the title Kunmi.

In the past, some scholars suggested that the Wusun spoke a Turkic language. Chinese scholar Han Rulin, as well as Ármin Vámbéry, A. Scherbak, P. Budberg, L. Bazin and V.P. Yudin, noted that the Wusun king's name Fu-li 拊離 (OC (20 BC) *phoʔ-rai > LHC *pʰuoᴮ-liai ~ *pʰuoᴮ-lie), as reported in Chinese sources and translated as 'wolf', resembles Proto-Turkic *bȫrü 'wolf'. This suggestion however is rejected by Classical Chinese Literature expert Francis K. H. So, Professor at National Sun Yat-sen University. Other words listed by these scholars include the title bag, beg 'lord'. This theory has been criticized by modern Turkologists, including Peter B. Golden and Carter V. Findley, who explain that none of the mentioned words are actually Turkic in origin. Findley notes that the term böri is probably derived from one of the Iranian languages of Central Asia (cf. Khotanese birgga-). Meanwhile, Findley considers the title beg as certainly derived from the Sogdian baga 'lord', a cognate of Middle Persian baγ (as used by the rulers of the Sassanid Empire), as well as Sanskrit bhaga and Russian bog. According to Encyclopædia Iranica: "The origin of beg is still disputed, though it is mostly agreed that it is a loan-word. Two principal etymologies have been proposed. The first etymology is from a Middle Iranian form of Old Iranian baga; though the meaning would fit since the Middle Persian forms of the word often mean 'lord,' used of the king or others. The second etymology is from Chinese 伯 (MC pˠæk̚ > bó) 'eldest (brother), (feudal) lord'. Gerhard Doerfer on the other hand seriously considers the possibility that the word is genuinely Turkish. Whatever the truth may be, there is no connection with Turkish berk, Mongolian berke 'strong' or Turkish bögü, Mongolian böge 'wizard, shaman.'"

== Economy ==
According to the Shiji (c. 123) and the Book of Han (c. 96), Liu Xijun, a daughter of the Han prince Liu Jian, was sent to the ruler (kunmi or kunmo) of the Wusun between 110 BC and 105 BC. She describes them as nomads who lived in felt tents, ate raw meat and drank fermented mare's milk. Some early Chinese descriptions of the people were pejorative, describing them as "bad, greedy and unreliable, and much given to robbery", but their state was also described as very strong. However, the Wusun were also noted for their harmony towards their neighbours, even though they were constantly raided by the Xiongnu and Kangju.

The principal activity of the Wusun was cattle-raising, but they also practiced agriculture. Since the climate of Zhetysu and Dzungaria did not allow constant wandering, they probably wandered with each change of season in the search of pasture and water. Numerous archaeological finds have found querns and agricultural implements and bones of domesticated animals, suggesting a semi-nomadic pastoral economy.

== Social structure ==
The social structure of the Wusun resembled that of the Xiongnu. They were governed by the Great Kunmi, whose power was hereditary. The Great Kunmi and his two sons, who commanded the east and left flanks of the Wusun realm, each commanded a force of 10,000 men. The Wusun also fielded a regular army, with each freeman being considered a warrior. Their administrative apparatus was fairly sophisticated, consisting of sixteen officials. The Great Kunmi was assisted by a council of elders, which limited his power to some degree. The Wusun elite maintained itself through tribute from conquered tribes, war booty and trading profits. The booty acquired by the Wusun in their frequent conflicts enabled the administrative elite and members of the Kunmi's guard to amass enormous riches.

Wusun society seems to have been highly stratified. The main source of this stratification seems to have been property ownership. The wealthiest Wusuns are believed to have owned as many as 4,000 to 5,000 horses, and there is evidence pointing to privileged use of certain pastures. Typical of early patriarchal stratified societies, Wusun widows were obliged to remain within the family of their late husband by marrying one of his relatives, a concept known as levirate marriage. Y. A. Zadneprovskiy writes that the social inequality among the Wusun created social unrest among the lower strata. Wusun society also included many slaves, mostly prisoners of war. The Wusun are reported as having captured 10,000 slaves in a raid against the Xiongnu. Wusun slaves mainly laboured as servants and craftsmen, although the freemen formed the core of the Wusun economy.

== Archaeology ==
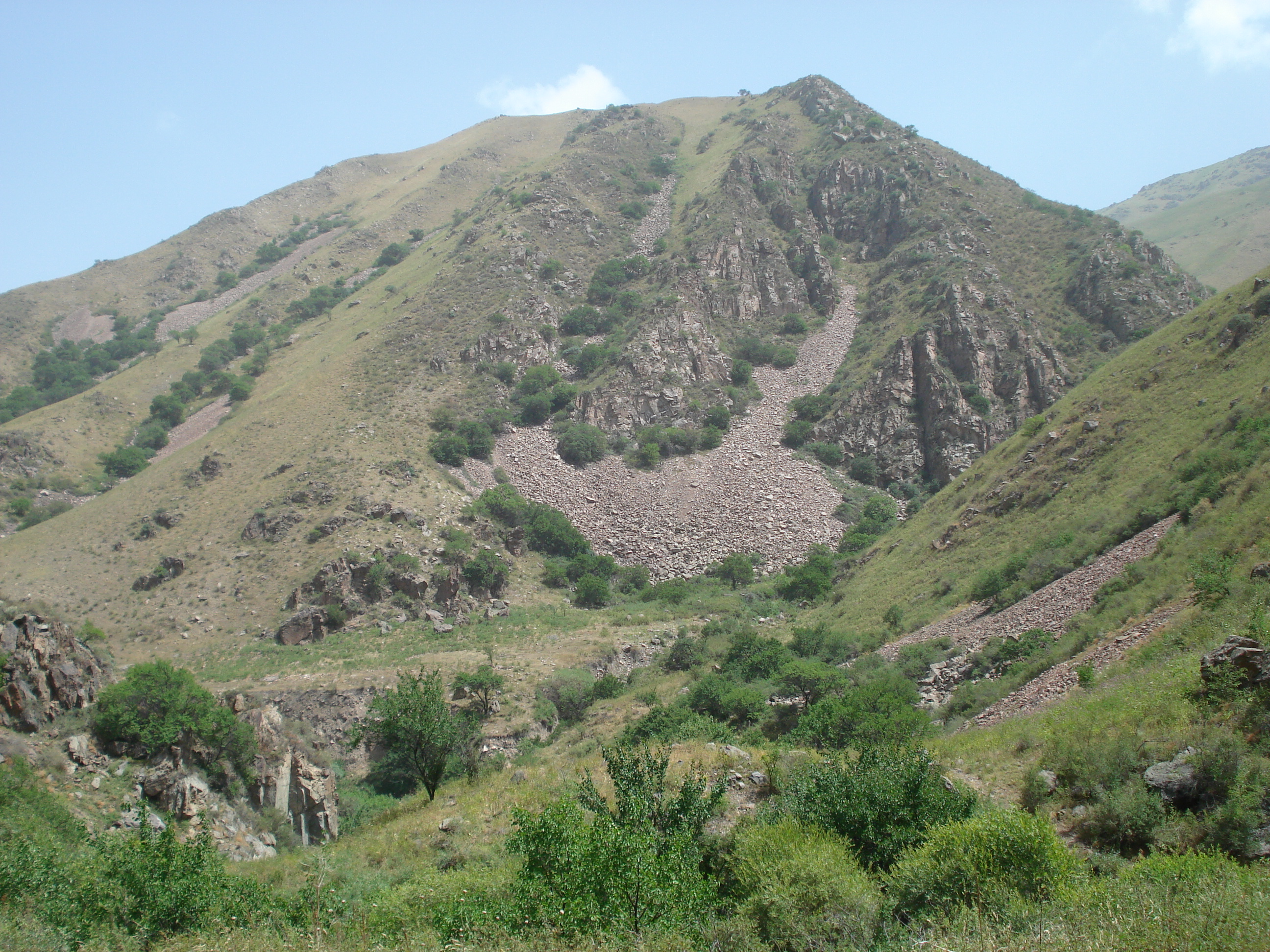
Area of Kargali, near Almaty, where the Wusun grave of a shaman woman was discovered

Numerous sites belonging to the Wusun period in Zhetysu and the Tian Shan have been excavated. Most of the cemeteries are burial grounds with the dead interred in pit-graves, referred to as the Chil-pek group, which probably belong the local Saka population. A second group of kurgans with burials in lined "catacomb" chamber graves, of the so-called Aygîrdzhal group, are found together with the Chil-pek tombs from the 2nd century BC to the 5th century AD, and have been attributed to the Yuezhi. Graves of the Wusun period typically contain personal belongings, with the burials of the Aygîrdzhal group often containing weapons.

A famous find associated with the Wusun is the Kargali burial of a female Shaman discovered at an altitude of 2,300 m (7,500 ft), near Almaty (43.1086°N 76.4355°E), containing jewellery, clothing, head-dress and nearly 300 gold objects. Another find at Tenlik in eastern Zhetysu (44.9130°N 78.6514°E) contained the grave of a high-ranking warrior associated with the Wusun, whose clothing had been decorated with around 100 golden items.

== Connection to Western histography ==
Some scholars such as Peter B. Golden have proposed that the Wusun may have been identical with the people described by Herodotus (IV. 16–25) and in Ptolemy's Geography as Issedones (also Issedoni, Issedoi or Essedoni). Their exact location of their country in Central Asia is unknown. The Issedones are "placed by some in Western Siberia and by others in Chinese Turkestan," according to E. D. Phillips.

French historian Iaroslav Lebedynsky suggests that the Wusun may have been the Asii of Geographica.

== Genetics ==
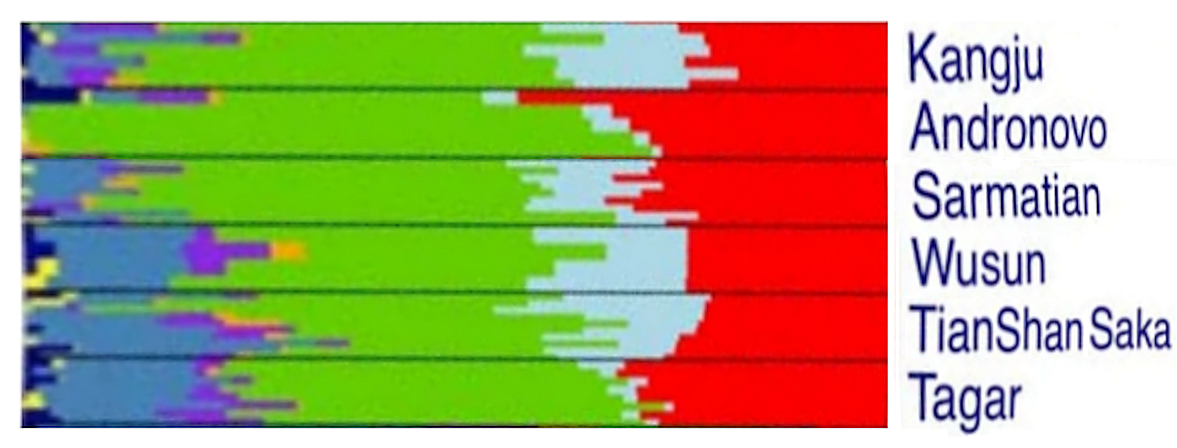
Genetic proximity of Eastern Indo-Europeans: the Wusun had great genetic proximity with the Kangju, the Andronovo, the Sarmatians, the Sakas or the Tagar populations.

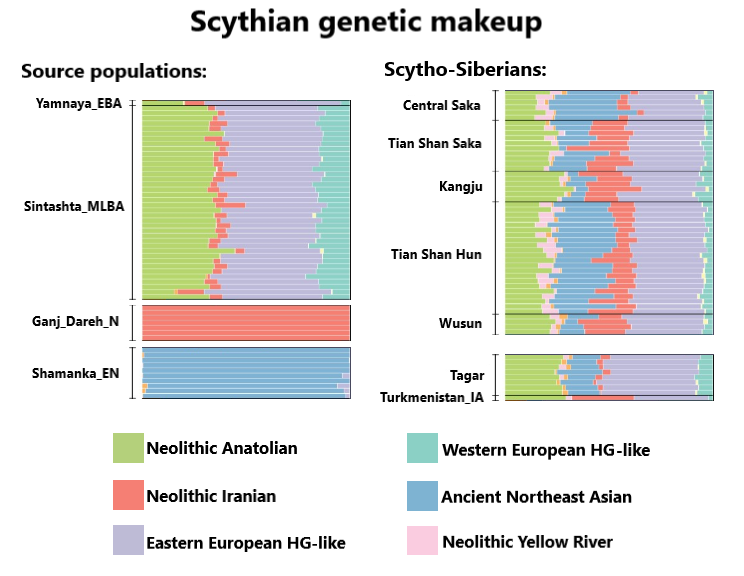
Genetic makeup of Iron Age Central Asian Scythians. The three main ancestry components are shown in green, red and violet representing the ancestries maximized in Anatolian farmers, Iranian farmers, and Hunter Gatherers from West Siberia, respectively.

A genetic study published in Nature in May 2018 examined the remains of four Wusun buried between c. 300 BC and 100 BC. The only Y-DNA of the Wusun culture belongs to the haplogroup R1a1a-Z93. The samples of mtDNA extracted belonged to C4a1, HV6, J1c5a and U5b2c. The authors of the study found that the Wusun and Kangju had less East Asian mixture than the Xiongnu and the Saka. Both the Wusun and Kangju were suggested to be descended from Western Steppe Herders of the Late Bronze Age who admixed with Siberian hunter-gatherers and peoples related to the Bactria–Margiana Archaeological Complex. An admixture analysis suggested that Tian Shan Wusun derived the major ancestry from Western Steppe Herders at a proportion of 47%, the remainder from Khövsgöl LBA herders (21%) and BMAC (32%).

One theory has suggested that the Uissun tribe of Kazakhstan is descended from the Wusun, based on the superficial similarity of the ethnonym 'Uissun' to Wusun. A 2020 study could not find support for this theory, as the Uissun have a very low frequency of Haplogroup R1a (6%), most of it belonging to the Z94 clade rather than the Iranian Z93 clade. Most of the Uissun lineages were typical of Mongols, supporting their historically attested Mongolian origin.

== See also ==
- Hyksos
- Iranians in China
- Kassites
- Maryannu
- Mitanni
- Qiang
