= Liu Fei, Prince of Jiangdu =

Liu Fei (劉非)

King of Jiangdu
- Reign: 153– c.Jan 128 BCE
- Successor: Liu Jian
- Born: 168 BCE
- Died: c.Jan 128 BCE
Posthumous name
- King Yi of Jiangdu (江都易王)
- Father: Emperor Jing of Han
- Mother: Consort Cheng

Liu Fei (Chinese: 劉非; pinyin: Liú Fēi; 168 – c. January 128 BCE), posthumously known as King Yi of Jiangdu (Chinese: 江都易王; pinyin: Jiāngdū Yì Wáng), was the King/Prince of Jiangdu (reigned 153–128 BCE), an autonomous kingdom within the Han Empire of Chinese history, in modern-day Jiangsu province. He was a son of Emperor Jing and a half-brother of Emperor Wu. Originally King of Runan, he was awarded the Kingdom of Jiangdu for his role in suppressing the Rebellion of the Seven States. Dong Zhongshu, the prominent Confucian scholar, served as his Prime Minister.

Liu Fei's mausoleum has been excavated by archaeologists from the Nanjing Museum, who unearthed numerous artifacts, including 100,000 coins, dozens of chariots, and the only jade coffin to have survived intact in Chinese archaeology.

== Biography ==
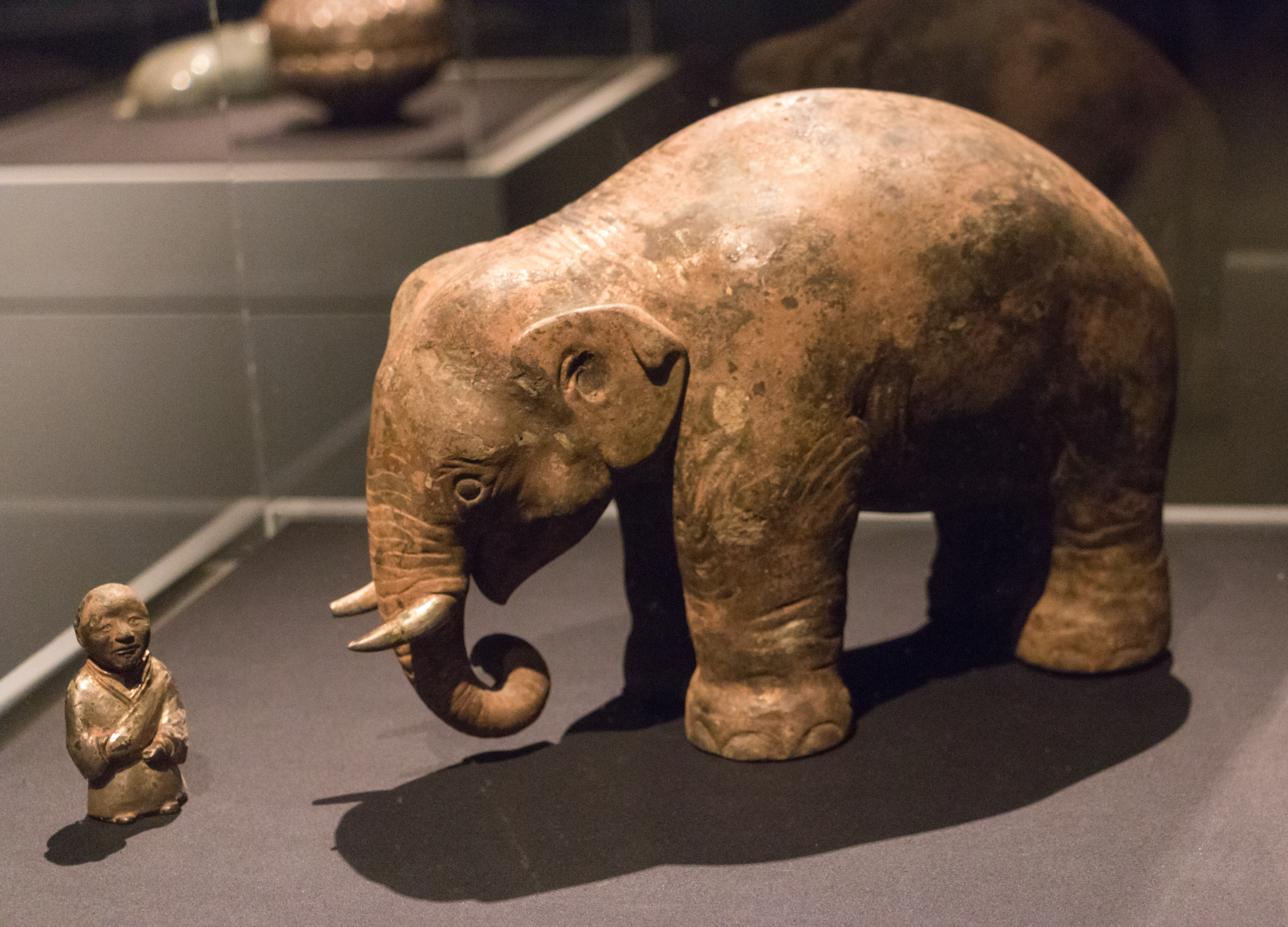
Gilt bronze figurines of elephant and dwarf groom. Found in the Tomb 1 of Liu Fei, Prince of Jiangdu, d. 129 BC, Dayunshan, Xuyi, Jiangsu, China. Nanjing Museum

Liu Fei was one of the fourteen sons of Emperor Jing of Han (reigned 157–141 BCE). With the exception of crown prince Liu Che, who later ascended the throne as Emperor Wu, Emperor Jing created all his other sons kings with their own fiefdoms. Liu Fei was made the King of Runan, with its capital at Shangcai, in modern-day Henan province. His mother was Consort Cheng, a concubine of Emperor Jing, who also gave birth to Liu Yu, Prince of Lu, and Liu Duan, King of Jiaoxi.

In 154 BCE, rulers of seven kingdoms, led by Liu Pi, the King of Wu, rebelled against the Han dynasty. Liu Fei, then a strong 15-year-old (by East Asian reckoning), volunteered to join the fight against the rebels. Emperor Jing awarded him the seal of the general, and let him lead an army to attack Wu, the main rebel kingdom. The rebellion was suppressed after a few months. The following year, Emperor Jing created the kingdom of Jiangdu in part of the former territory of Wu and made Liu Fei its king. Wu's capital Guangling (present-day Yangzhou, Jiangsu) became the capital of Jiangdu. In addition, he was awarded the banners of the Son of Heaven for his contribution in the suppression of the rebellion.

In 129 BCE, during the reign of Emperor Wu, the Xiongnu nomadic empire attacked the Han. Liu Fei volunteered to join the counterattack against Xiongnu, but his request was denied by the emperor.

According to the Han historian Sima Qian, Liu Fei built many palaces and towers, and his life "was marked by extreme arrogance and luxury". He valued physical prowess, and invited strong men to his court from everywhere. He also employed the influential Confucian scholar Dong Zhongshu as his Prime Minister.

== Death and aftermath ==
Liu Fei died in c. January 128 BCE, after 26 years of reign as King of Jiangdu. He was given the posthumous title King "Yi" (易), meaning "willing to change". His son, crown prince Liu Jian, succeeded him as king. Liu Jian was said to lead a debauched life, once having an orgy with ten women above his father's tomb. He also took Lady Nao, his father's favoured concubine famed for her beauty, as his own consort.

In 121 BCE, Liu Jian was involved in the plot of rebellion by Liu An, King of Huainan, and Liu Ci, King of Hengshan. After the plot was discovered, all three committed suicide, and their kingdoms were abolished. Jiangdu came under direct imperial rule and was reorganized as Guangling Commandery.

== Mausoleum ==
Liu Fei's mausoleum has been located in present-day Xuyi County, Jiangsu province. Because it was threatened by quarrying, archaeologists from the Nanjing Museum performed a "rescue excavation" of the site from 2009 to 2011, and published the excavation report in 2014. The complex includes three major tombs, eleven subsidiary tombs, two horse-and-chariot pits, and two pits for weapons. It is surrounded by an enclosure wall, which was originally 490 metres (1,610 ft) long on each side.

Although the site has been looted in ancient times, archaeologists still unearthed more than ten thousand artifacts: gold, bronze vessels, weapons, a zither with jade pegs, lamps of various shapes, a silver basin inscribed with the name of the Kingdom of Jiangdu, and a kitchen with food. Other findings include a treasury holding more than 100,000 banliang coins, and dozens of model chariots and several life-sized ones.

Liu Fei's coffins were damaged and his body was missing, but fragments of his jade burial suit were found. The most important find was from an adjacent tomb, labeled M2, which contained the only jade coffin known to have survived intact in China.

One of the eleven attendant tombs contained items inscribed with the surname Nao (淖). Its occupant was probably related to Liu Fei's consort Lady Nao.
