= Gong Beibi =

Chinese actress

- 龚蓓苾
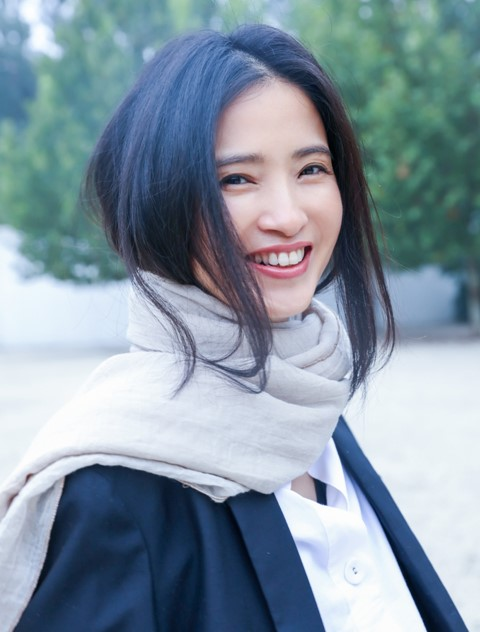
- Gong in 2017
- Born: February 21, 1978 (age 48); Fujian, China
- Other name: Baby
- Education: Central Academy of Drama
- Occupations: Actress, Producer
- Years active: 1994–present
- Agent: Creative Artists Agency

Beibi Gong (Chinese: 龚蓓苾; pinyin: Gōng Bèibì) (born February 21, 1978, in Fujian, China) is a Chinese film and television actress. Beginning her acting career as a teenager after she was discovered for the lead role in the film You Are Not Sixteen, Gong later studied and graduated from the nationally prestigious Central Academy of Drama. She first gained recognition among audiences in China after starring in several popular TV series and feature films in both mainland China and Hong Kong. Due to her success while still a student, Gong was dubbed in the media at the time as "little Gong Li", who also graduated from the same acting college.

After graduating, Gong continued diversifying her roles with different projects, including starring in and executive producing Bus 44, which gained her critical acclaim in China, Europe, and North America where it premiered and won awards at the Venice Film Festival, Sundance Film Festival and Cannes Film Festival.

In 2005, Gong Beibi starred in the feature film Waiting Alone which opened to critical raves at the Tokyo Film Festival. The indie film was released nationwide in September 2005 and became a hit with audiences across China, and one of the best reviewed and most talked about Chinese films the year. Waiting Alone was nominated for several awards including "Best Picture" at the Chinese academy awards (Golden Rooster Awards). Gong Beibi's memorable performance in Waiting Alone, which Variety magazine called "impressive", garnered her a "Most Favorite Actress" nomination at the 12th Beijing Student Film Festival.

Gong's 2007 Chinese holiday ensemble comedy Call for Love was a success at the box office, she followed up with a special appearance in action director Benny Chan's Connected the Hong Kong action film remake of Cellular, and continued starring in TV series.

In 2010, Gong co-starred with Aaron Kwok in Oxide Pang's thriller The Detective 2. In 2011, Beibi Gong starred alongside Academy Award winner Kevin Spacey and Daniel Wu in Dayyan Eng's dramedy/psychological suspense Inseparable. Inseparable was named one of The Wall Street Journal's Top 10 Most Notable Asian Films of 2011.

Beibi was next seen in several back-to-back TV series in China, most notably The Legend of Qin in 2015, and as the Ice Queen in Ice Fantasy based on Guo Jingming's popular fantasy novel in 2016.

In 2017, Gong won the Jury Award for "Best Actress" at the Beijing Youth Film Festival for her starring role in the indie drama Lack of Love. She was also in the hit TV series Fighter of the Destiny and the Monkey King comedy A Chinese Odyssey: Love You a Million Years playing Princess Ironfan. Behind the camera, she was a co-producer on the summer fantasy comedy indie hit Wished.

In 2018, Gong Beibi starred in the TV series The Flame's Daughter which had over 700 million viewing hits in China and was later on Amazon Prime, as well as, co-starring in the surprise summer blockbuster hit, Dying to Survive, which become one of the biggest box office films in China. Beibi played two different lead characters in Summer Blur, which won awards at Busan Film Festival and the 2021 Berlin Film Festival Generations section.

In 2021, Gong starred in the indie sports drama On Your Mark which did well at the Chinese box office, the film was directed by Malaysian director Chiu Keng Guan.

Beibi Gong was next seen in the TV series remake of The Return of the Condor Heroes playing one of the iconic roles, as well as two other popular TV series in China: Pride & Price and Master of My Own. In 2023, she was in the hit ensemble TV series Meet Yourself, playing Liu Yifei's tough yet loving sister.

In 2024, she was in the hit TV series Best Choice Ever and teamed up again with director Ning Hao to reprise her character in the film sequel to My People, My Country. Summer of 2025, she was in the popular C-drama Deep Affection Eyes where she played the antagonist Li Lingbai.

Gong stars alongside Duan Yihong in the Jia Zhang-Ke produced crime drama Heaven and Hell, releasing in 2026.

== Personal life ==
Bachelor of Arts in drama, from Central Drama Academy in Beijing, China. She can speak Mandarin, Minnanyu (Hokkien), and English.

== Selected acting filmography ==
- You Are Not Sixteen (你没有十六岁) (1994)
- Beijing Hong Kong Love Connection (京港爱情线) (1997)
- The Lord of Hangzhou (杭州王爷) (1998)
- An Unusual Love (非常爱情) (1998)
- Sun Moon Star (星星月亮太阳) (1999)
- Bus 44 (车四十四) (2001) (Also Executive Producer)
- Waiting Alone (独自等待) (2004) * Nominated - Audience Favorite Actress / Beijing Students Film Festival
- The Ghost Inside (疑神疑鬼) (2005)
- Call for Love (爱情呼叫转移) (2007) * Nominated - Audience Favorite Actress / Beijing Students Film Festival
- Connected (保持通话) (2008)
- The Founding of a Republic (2009)
- Zhao Dan (赵丹) (2010) (TV series)
- The Detective 2 (B+侦探) (2011)
- Inseparable (形影不离) (2011)
- Lucky Dog (2013)
- The Buddha's Shadow (2014)
- Over the Sky (2014)
- Journey (2015)
- Wo de hun yin shui zuo zhu (我的婚姻谁做主) (2015)
- Bad Bosses (恶老板) (2015)
- The Legend of Qin (live action TV series) (秦时明月) (2015)
- Ice Fantasy (幻城) (2016)
- Lack of Love (缺失的爱) (2017) * Won - Best Actress Award / Beijing Youth Film Festival
- Fighter of the Destiny (择天记) (2017)
- A Chinese Odyssey: Love You a Million Years (大话西游之爱你一万年) (2017)
- The Flame's Daughter (烈火如歌) (2018)
- Dying to Survive (我不是药神) (2018)
- My People, My Country (我和我的祖国) (2019)
- Adoring (宠爱) (2019)
- In a Class of Her Own (漂亮书生) (2020)
- The Blooms at Ruyi Pavilion (如意芳菲) (2020)
- Summer Blur (汉南夏日) (2020) * Won - Berlin Film Festival / Busan Film Festival
- On Your Mark (了不起的老爸) (2021)
- Remembrance of Things Past (我在他乡挺好的) (2021)
- Pride & Price (盛装) (2022)
- The Return of the Condor Heroes (新神雕侠侣) (2022)
- Master of My Own (请叫我总监) (2022)
- The Fallen Bridge (断桥) (2022)
- Meet Yourself (去有风的地方) (2023)
- Look Up and See Joy (抬头见喜) (2023)
- All Ears (不虚此行) (2023)
- There Will Be Ample Time (故乡, 别来无恙) (2023)
- Burning Years (似火流年) (2023)
- Best Choice Ever (承欢记) (2024)
- The Hutong Cowboy (爆款好人) (2024)
- Deep Affection Eyes (深情眼) (2025)
- Shadow (替身拳手) (2025)
- Cicada Girls (玫瑰丛生) (2026)
- Romance of the Western Chamber (西厢记) (2026)
- Bloom Life（喀什恋歌）(2026)
- Heaven and Hell (一刀天堂) (TBA)
- Empress Reborn (将门独后) (TBA)
