= Hundred Flowers Award for Best Supporting Actress =

Chinese film award

The Hundred Flowers Award for Best Supporting Actress was first awarded by the China Film Association in 1962.

== 1980–2004 ==
Year	Actor	Film	Character
1980 (3rd)	Liu Xiaoqing	What a Family	Zhang Lan
1981 (4th)	—N/a	—N/a	—N/a
1982 (5th)	—N/a	—N/a	—N/a
1983 (6th)	Jiang Lili	Three Dimensional People	Ye Fang
1984 (7th)	Wang Fuli	Our Niu Baisui	Juhua
1985 (8th)	Wang Yumei	Wreaths at the Foot of the Mountain	Madame Liang
1986 (9th)	Wang Fuli	Sunrise	Cuixi
1987 (10th)	Zhang Xiaomin	Extraordinary President	Soong Ching-ling
1988 (11th)	Lü Liping	Old Well	Duan Xifeng
1989 (12th)	Gong Li	Code Name: Cugar	Li
1990 (13th)	Lin Moyu	A Dream of Red Mansions	Grandmother Jia
1991 (14th)	Wu Yujuan	Dragon Year Cops	Zhong Xiaomei
1992 (15th)	Lü Liping	No Regrets About Youth	Liu Jie
1993 (16th)	Chen Xiaoyi	Divorce	Madame Ma
1994 (17th)	Ding Jiali	No More Applause	Han Liting
1995 (18th)	Li Yuanyuan	A Born Coward	Liu Yurong
1996 (19th)	He Saifei	Behind Enemy Lines	Hongyun
1997 (20th)	Song Chunli	The Days Without Lei Feng	Qiao Anshan's wife
1998 (21st)	Zhang Lu	A Virtuous Widow	Xiangcao
1999 (22nd)	Li Xiaohong	Love Through Movie	Yindi
2000 (23rd)	Tao Hong	Agreed Not to Separate	Lu Xinxin
2001 (24th)	Yan Qingyu	Keeping Moon at Heart	Yuelan
2002 (25th)	Yuan Li	Pure Sentiment	An Ran
2003 (26th)	Yuan Quan	Pretty Big Feet	Xia Yu
2004 (27th)	Zhang Yan	Warm Spring	Xiaohua

== Since 2006 ==
Year	Actor	Film	Character
2006; 28th	Yuen Qiu	Kung Fu Hustle	landlady
2006; 28th	Bai Qing	Ren Changxia	Madame Liang
2006; 28th	Tao Yuling	Ren Changxia	Ren Changxia's mother
2006; 28th	Li Bingbing	A World Without Thieves	Ye
2008; 29th	Gua Ah-leh	The Knot	Wang Biyun (old)
2008; 29th	Luo Haiqiong	Assembly	medical doctor
2008; 29th	Hou Shu	Crazy Stone	Jingjing
2008; 29th	Yang Jing	Invisible Wings	Zhihua's mother
2010; 30th	Xu Qing (tie)	The Founding of a Republic	Soong Ching-ling
2010; 30th	Wang Jia (tie)	Frightening Moment	Qi Hongyu
2010; 30th	Sun Li	Painted Skin	Xia Bing
2010; 30th	Che Xiao	If You Are the One	secretary
2010; 30th	Ma Su	Iron Man	Wu Mengxia
2012; 31st	Ning Jing	1911	Qiu Jin
2012; 31st	Zhu Yuanyuan	Ocean Heaven	Madame Chai
2012; 31st	Zhang Jingchu	Aftershock	Fang Deng
2012; 31st	Karen Mok	Go Lala Go!	Rose
2012; 31st	Gwei Lun-mei	Flying Swords of Dragon Gate	Zhang Xiaowen
2014; 32nd	Deng Jiajia	Silent Witness	Lin Mengmeng
2014; 32nd	Tao Hong	Lost in Thailand	Xu Lang's wife
2014; 32nd	Hai Qing	Finding Mr. Right	Zhou Yi
2014; 32nd	Yuan Quan	The White Storm	Yuan Ke'er
2014; 32nd	Charlie Young	Cold War	Phoenix Leung Chi-mei
2016; 33rd	Angelababy	Mojin: The Lost Legend	Ding Sitian
2016; 33rd	Wang Zhi	Goodbye Mr. Loser	Qiu Ya
2016; 33rd	Li Yuan	Go Away Mr. Tumor	Xia Meng
2016; 33rd	Yao Chen	Monster Hunt	Cooking master
2016; 33rd	Liang Jing	Mr. Six	Dengzhao'er's wife
2018; 34th	Jiang Luxia	Operation Red Sea	Tong Li
2018; 34th	Zhang Tian'ai	The Founding of an Army	Soong Mei-ling
2018; 34th	Li Haofang	Soul Mate	An Sheng (young)
2018; 34th	Feng Wenjuan	Operation Mekong	Guo Bing
2020; 35th	Yuan Quan	The Captain	Bi Nan
2020; 35th	Feng Wenjuan	Project Gutenberg	Ng Sau-ching
2020; 35th	Choenyi Tsering	The Climbers	Black Peony
2020; 35th	Wu Yue	Better Days	Zhu Lei
2020; 35th	Yang Zi	The Bravest	Wang Lu
2022; 36th	Zhu Yuanyuan	Sister	An Rongrong
2022; 36th	Hai Qing	My Country, My Parents	the younger sister (adult); astronaut
2022; 36th	Liu Jia	Hi, Mom	Li Huanying (middle-aged)
2022; 36th	Qi Xi	Nice View	Wang Chunmei
2022; 36th	Zhou Ye	Chinese Doctors	Xiao Wen
2024; 37th	Zhao Liying	Article 20	Hao Xiuping
2024; 37th	Gao Ye	Article 20	Lu Lingling
2024; 37th	Yuan Quan	Creation of the Gods I: Kingdom of Storms	Queen Jiang
2024; 37th	Janice Man	Lost in the Stars	Fake Li Muzi / Jane
2024; 37th	Hai Qing	The Volunteers: To the War	Lin Qiaozhi

== Records ==
Items	Name	Statistics	Notes
Most win	Wang Fuli	2 wins	
Most win	Lü Liping	2 wins	
Most win	Yuan Quan	2 wins	
First Hong Kong actress win	Yuen Qiu	1 win	2008, for Kung Fu Hustle
