= Ola Bola =

- Official theatrical poster
- Directed by: Chiu Keng Guan
- Written by: Chan Yoke Yeng; Tan Pik Yee
- Produced by: Najwa Abu Bakar; Tung Yow Kong; Datuk Steven Lim
- Starring: JC Chee; Luqman Hafidz; Saran Kumar; Marianne Tan; Katrina Ho; Bront Palarae; Frankie Lee
- Cinematography: Chin Ting-chang
- Edited by: Gwyneth Lee
- Music by: Onn San
- Production companies: Astro Shaw; Golden Screen Cinemas; Multimedia Entertainment Sdn Bhd
- Distributed by: Golden Screen Cinemas
- Release date: 28 January 2016 (Malaysia)
- Running time: 108 minutes
- Country: Malaysia
- Languages: Malay; English; Mandarin; Tamil; Cantonese; Hakka; Hokkien
- Budget: MYR 5 million
- Box office: MYR 16.67 million

Ola Bola is a 2016 Malaysian sport drama film directed by Chiu Keng Guan starring JC Chee, Luqman Hafidz, Saran Kumar, Marianne Tan, Katrina Ho, Frankie Lee and Bront Palarae. The film was inspired by the glories of the Malaysia national football team which successfully entered the 1980 Summer Olympics. The film was released in Malaysian cinemas on 28 January 2016. As of November 2019, Ola Bola is currently ranked the tenth-highest grossing Malaysian film of all-time.

== Plot ==
A journalist, Marianne is commissioned to research the Malaysia national football team of the 80's. Disillusioned by her working life in Malaysia, she decides to emigrate to England once she completes the project. She goes to Sabah to interview Eric, a former player of the team.

In 1980, the team practises for the upcoming pre-Olympics matches, with captain Chow Kwok Keong serving as the interim coach until Harry Mountain takes over. Meanwhile, aspiring sports commentator and Chow's friend, Rahman practises with his mentors. Mountain revises the formation, such as by having Eric being changed from a reserve goalkeeper to a striker. Having not getting used to the new formation, and also due to Chow disobeying the coach's orders, the team is unable to win any friendly matches. Soon, Eric and fellow striker Ali have a falling out over the squad number 10. Chow assumes responsibility for their embarrassing performance and quits the team.

The team continues on their losing streak. In the meantime, the three younger brothers of Muthu the goalkeeper are injured in an attempt to help their father deliver coconuts by driving the lorry. Fed up with Muthu's (fruitless) football endeavours and him not being able to help with work, Muthu's father reprimands him. Muthu contemplates also about quitting the team out of perceived incompetence, but does not do so.

Chow remembers his pledge to lead the team to glory and decides to rejoin the team. Mountain welcomes him back and advises him to "not make the same mistakes I did when I was younger." After extensive practice and military training, the team finally starts winning again.

Malaysia competes with South Korea at Stadium Merdeka in the final match, where Rahman is assigned to commentate. In the first half, an opponent informs Ali that Malaysia is boycotting the Olympics. During the half-time break, Ali shares the news to his teammates' disappointment. Mountain and Chow knew about this all along, but could not disclose it lest team morale be affected. Not willing to give up, Muthu encourages them to play on resolutely regardless whether they make it to Moscow. They display excellent skill and teamwork later on as Rahman delivers a thrilling and emphatic commentary. Ali scores the decisive goal; they win 3–2.

In the present day, Marianne gets the now-elderly Chow on television and has changed her mind about leaving. In a post-credits scene, she tells her boss Rahman that she knows his "secret": his past career as football commentator.

== Cast ==
=== Main cast ===
- JC Chee as Chow Kwok Keong/Tauke (Soh Chin Ann motif)
- Muhd Luqman Hafidz bin Mohd Fauzi as Ahmad Ali (Hassan Sani motif)
- Sarankumar Manokaran as Muthu Kumar (The late R. Arumugam motif)
- Bront Palarae as Rahman (Rahim Razali motif)
- Marianne Tan Poh Yee as Marianne

=== Supporting cast ===
- Lim Jian Wen as Yap Tiam Cai/Ah Chai
- Eric Teng Shin Wang as Eric Yong/Balak Eric (James Wong motif)
- Daphne Low Sin Mun as Chow Mei Ling, Kwok Keong's sister
- Mark Williams as Harry Mountain (The late Karl-Heinz Weigang motif)
- Mohamad Taufiq Hanafi as Mohamad Abu (Shukor Salleh motif)
- Katrina Ho Fooi Tin as Tan Siew Lee
- Ganasen Thanimalai as Ali's colleague
- Sri Balasubramaniam as Muthu's father.
- Shivatharan Nambiar as Rajah, Muthu's younger brother.
- Haris Mohd Zainuddin as Sanjeet Singh.
- Andy Darrel Gomes as an office colleague.
- Bernard Hiew as a Hakka football fan.
- Firzany Mokti as the assistant coach.

=== Special appearance ===
- Soh Chin Ann as Chow Kok Keong (modern-day)
- Lee Chwee Sieang as Tan Siew Lee (modern-day)
- Rahim Razali as Rahman's sports commentator superior
- Markus Wehner Glæsel
- Janus Emil Mariager

=== Cameo appearance ===
- The late Frankie Lee Sai Peng as a security guard

== Production ==
=== Original soundtrack ===
"Arena Cahaya"

Single by Zee Avi
- Released: 23 November 2015
- Recorded: 2015
- Genre: Acoustic
- Length: 4:15
- Songwriters: Zee Avi; Rendra Zawawi
- Producer: Astro Shaw

The original soundtrack for the movie, Arena Cahaya is written and performed by Zee Avi. The song is co-produced by Zee and Rendra Zawawi. The song is the winner of the "Best Original Theme Song" category in the Taipei Golden Horse Film Festival in 2016 This song also won the "Best Original Theme Song" award at the 28th Malaysia Film Festival held on 3 September 2016.

== Reception ==
=== Box-office ===
The film opened to 120 theatres across Malaysia and earned approximately RM2.5 million for the first 4 days of its release. The figure had accumulated to around RM8 million thirteen days later.

Thomas Schmid, who wrote for Film Journal International, had reported that the film had supposedly failed to reach Malaysia's top 20 box-office, performing "relatively slowly" compared with other recent foreign blockbusters despite banking on director Keng's success with his previous work The Journey. However, local entertainment portal The Daily Seni refuted this claim, providing their own figures for the film with approximately RM15.3 million as of early March 2016. The portal further explained that the film's supposed flop was due to weekly Malaysian box office reports being never disclosed to the public.

== Accolades ==
Award	Year	Category	Nominee	Result
Taipei Golden Horse Film Festival	2016	Best Original Theme Song	Zee Avi/Rendra Zawawi	Won
Malaysia Film Festival	2016	Best Film		Nominated
Malaysia Film Festival	2016	Best Director	Chiu Keng Guan	Nominated
Malaysia Film Festival	2016	Best Supporting Actor	Sri Balasubramaniam	Nominated
Malaysia Film Festival	2016	Best Original Story	Chiu Keng Guan/Chan Yoke Yeng/Tan Pik Yee	Nominated
Malaysia Film Festival	2016	Best Screenplay	Chan Yoke Yeng/Tan Pik Yee	Nominated
Malaysia Film Festival	2016	Best Costume Design	Elaine Ng/Weng Shum	Won
Malaysia Film Festival	2016	Best Editing	Gywneth Lee	Nominated
Malaysia Film Festival	2016	Best Art Design	Soon Yong Chow	Nominated
Malaysia Film Festival	2016	Best Original Score	San Weng Onn (Onn San)/San Wai Lik (Alex San)	Won
Malaysia Film Festival	2016	Best Original Theme Song	Zee Avi/Rendra Zawawi	Won
Malaysia Film Festival	2016	Best New Actor	Saran Kumar	Nominated
Malaysia Film Festival	2016	Best New Actress	Marianne Tan	Nominated
Malaysia Film Festival	2016	Best Child Actor	Shivatharan Nambiar	Nominated
Malaysia Film Festival	2016	Best Visual Effects	Bak Chee Hong	Nominated
Malaysia Film Festival	2016	Special Jury Award - National Unity		Won

== Controversies ==
=== Plot discrepancy ===
Some members of the public, including two key players in the Malaysian team that qualified for that Olympics, voiced concerns over the potential confusion that may arise from the distortion of certain facts depicted in the movie. That includes the actual scoreline and the player scoring the winning goal in the qualifier against South Korea.

The production team has since clarified that the plot is "inspired by a true story" as mentioned in the opening scene of the movie, and is not meant to be a historical account.

=== Disqualification in the 28th Malaysia Film Festival ===
Ola Bola became a subject of public outrage when it became one of the high-profile films to be disqualified from the Best Film shortlist in the 28th Malaysia Film Festival and lumped in the controversial Non-Bahasa Malaysia categories by the award organisers National Film Development Corporation (FINAS) and Film Producers Association Malaysia (PFM), because it contained less than 70% Bahasa Malaysia dialogue.

The action was deemed to be a "racist" move, as claimed by the president of the Selangor and Kuala Lumpur Screenwriters Association (PENULIS), Alfie Palermo. Filmmaker Afdlin Shauki announced on his Facebook page of his boycott to express his dissatisfaction, which was supported by CIMB Group chairman Nazir Razak and Air Asia CEO Tony Fernandes. One participating cinematographer, Mohd Noor Kassim, also followed suit; withdrawing his nominations in the occasion and returned two FFM trophies he won in previous editions to FINAS director Kamil Othman during a forum held by the agency in Kuala Lumpur. There had also been calls from both within and out of the film industry to boycott the award ceremony. The assistant-general secretary of the Film Directors’ Association of Malaysia (FDAM) Hafiz Ibrahim resigned in protest of the unfair segregation.

FINAS has since revamped the category system under instructions from Multimedia and Communications Minister Datuk Seri Salleh Said Keruak on 10 August. All non-Bahasa Malaysia categories were removed and nominees were eligible to compete for Best Film, Director and Screenplay in the original category, where a new category - Best Film in the National Language - is established in their place, where nominees that meet a 70% Bahasa Malaysia requirement can compete in this particular category.

== See also ==
- List of association football films
