= Guardians of the temple =

Guardians of the temple may refer to:

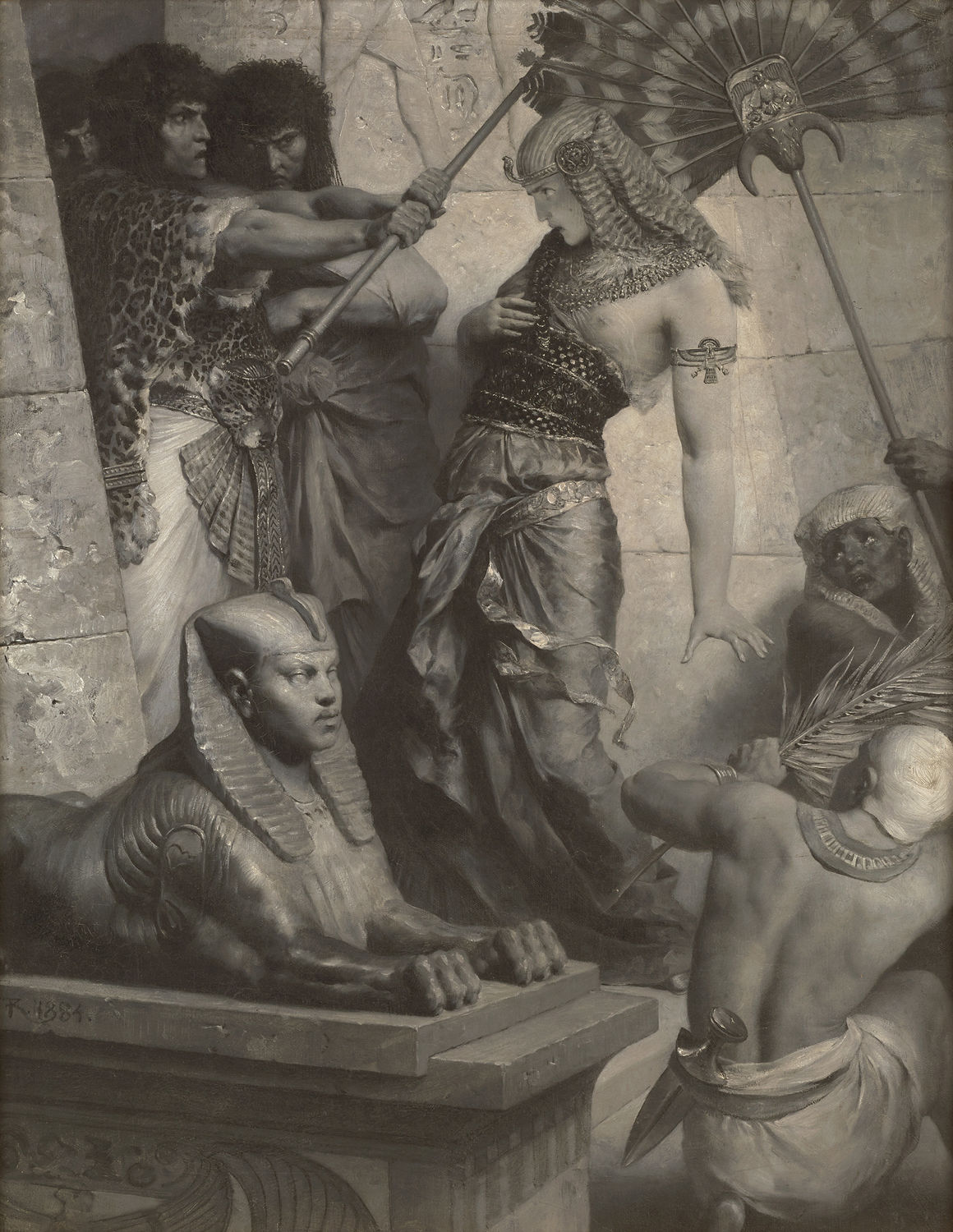
The Guardians of the Temple by Ferdinand Keller

- The Game of Death, a film begun by Bruce Lee. The original story features fighters guarding the different levels of a pagoda.
- Guardians of the Tomb is a 2018 film.
- Dvarapala, guardian figures placed at the entrances of Hindu and Buddhist temples.
- Nio (Buddhism), a pair of Buddhist guardian figures, typically depicted as muscular figures standing at temple entrances. The article also mentions the equivalent Chinese figures known as Heng Ha Er Jiang.
- Nāga, serpent-like mythological beings in Hindu and Buddhist traditions, sometimes associated with the protection of sacred places.
- Sphinx, a mythological creature associated, in various traditions, with guarding places and entrances.
- Guardians of the directions or Lokapāla, deities associated with the protection of the cosmic directions in Asian religious traditions.
- Knights Templar, a medieval religious military order founded in the Holy Land to protect pilgrims, later involved in various military and administrative activities.
