= Barry Mendel =

American film producer

Barry Mendel (born 1963) is an American film producer. Mendel first produced Wes Anderson’s Rushmore starring Jason Schwartzman and Bill Murray, which won two Film Independent Spirit Awards for Best Director and Best Supporting Actor. This was followed by The Sixth Sense, directed by M. Night Shyamalan, which was nominated for six Academy Awards including Best Picture. Subsequently, he produced Shyamalan's follow-up, Unbreakable, then went back to work with Anderson on The Royal Tenenbaums, which was Oscar-nominated for Best Original Screenplay. Their collaboration continued on The Life Aquatic with Steve Zissou, which Mendel followed by producing Joss Whedon’s feature film directorial debut, Serenity. Mendel next conceived, developed and produced Munich, directed by Steven Spielberg, which was nominated for five Academy Awards including Best Picture. He then produced Whip It, Drew Barrymore’s debut as a feature director, which starred Elliot Page and Kristen Wiig. Mendel produced another film with Page, Peacock, which co-starred Cillian Murphy and Susan Sarandon.

In recent years, Mendel and Judd Apatow have become frequent collaborators. Mendel produced the Apatow-directed Funny People, This Is 40, Trainwreck and most recently The King of Staten Island starring Pete Davidson. The pair also produced Bridesmaids and The Big Sick, which were both Oscar-nominated for Best Original Screenplay, bringing to five the number of screenplay nominations for films Mendel has produced.

He also produced Sundance Special Jury Prize-winning musical God Help the Girl, a collaboration with Stuart Murdoch of the Scottish band Belle and Sebastian, who wrote and directed the film.

== Producer credits ==
He was a producer in all films unless otherwise noted.

=== Film ===
Year(s)	Film(s)	Director(s)	Writer(s)	Co-Producer(s)	Distributor(s)	RT
1998	Rushmore	Wes Anderson	Wes Anderson & Owen Wilson	Paul Schiff	Buena Vista Pictures	89%
1999	The Sixth Sense	M. Night Shyamalan		Frank Marshall and Kathleen Kennedy	Buena Vista Pictures	86%
2000	Unbreakable	M. Night Shyamalan		Sam Mercer & M. Night Shyamalan	Buena Vista Pictures	70%
2001	The Royal Tenenbaums	Wes Anderson	Wes Anderson & Owen Wilson	Wes Anderson and Scott Rudin	Buena Vista Pictures	80%
2004	The Life Aquatic with Steve Zissou	Wes Anderson	Wes Anderson & Noah Baumbach	Wes Anderson and Scott Rudin	Buena Vista Pictures	56%
2005	Serenity	Joss Whedon		—	Universal Pictures	82%
2005	Munich	Steven Spielberg	Tony Kushner & Eric Roth	Steven Spielberg, Kathleen Kennedy and Colin Wilson	Universal Pictures	78%
2008	The Happening	M. Night Shyamalan		M. Night Shyamalan and Sam Mercer	20th Century Fox	18%
2009	Funny People	Judd Apatow		Judd Apatow and Clayton Townsend	Universal Pictures	69%
2009	Whip It	Drew Barrymore	Shauna Cross	Drew Barrymore	Fox Searchlight Pictures	85%
2010	Peacock	Michael Lander	Michael Lander & Ryan Roy	—	Mandate Pictures	N/A
2010	Shanghai	Mikael Håfström	Hossein Amini	Mike Medavoy, Jake Myers, David U. Lee	The Weinstein Company	4%
2011	Bridesmaids	Paul Feig	Annie Mumolo & Kristen Wiig	Judd Apatow and Clayton Townsend	Universal Pictures	90%
2012	This Is 40	Judd Apatow		Judd Apatow and Clayton Townsend	Universal Pictures	51%
2014	God Help the Girl	Stuart Murdoch		—	Metrodome	67%
2015	Trainwreck	Judd Apatow	Amy Schumer	Judd Apatow	Universal Pictures	84%
2017	The Big Sick	Michael Showalter	Emily V. Gordon & Kumail Nanjiani	Judd Apatow	Amazon Studios	98%
2018	Juliet, Naked	Jesse Peretz	Tamara Jenkins, Jim Taylor & Evgenia Peretz	Judd Apatow, Albert Berger, Ron Yerxa and Jeffrey Soros	Roadside Attractions	83%
2020	The King of Staten Island	Judd Apatow	Judd Apatow, Pete Davidson & Dave Sirus	Judd Apatow	Universal Pictures	75%
2022	The Bubble	Judd Apatow	Judd Apatow, Pam Brady	Judd Apatow (Mandel served as executive producer)	Netflix	21%

Thanks

Year	Film	Role
2002	Laurel Canyon	Special thanks

=== Television ===
Year	Title	Notes
2009	Funny People: HBO Behind the Comedy	Television short
