= Feng Wenjuan =

Chinese actress

- 冯文娟
- Born: 20 August 1989 (age 37); Baoding, Hebei, China
- Education: Central Academy of Drama
- Occupation: Actress
- Years active: 2012–present

Chinese name
- Traditional Chinese: 馮文娟
- Simplified Chinese: 冯文娟
Transcriptions
Standard Mandarin
- Hanyu Pinyin: Féng Wénjuān

Feng Wenjuan (Chinese: 冯文娟; born 20 August 1989) is a Chinese actress best known for her role in a number of films, including The Last Tycoon (2012), Operation Mekong (2016), and Project Gutenberg (2017).

== Early life and education ==
Feng was born in Baoding, Hebei, on 20 August 1989, and graduated from the Central Academy of Drama in 2012.

== Acting career ==
In 2012, Feng made her film debut in The Last Tycoon, for which she received Best New Performer nomination at the 32nd Hong Kong Film Awards.

Feng made her television debut in The Lure of Cloud (2013), playing Yu Wen.

Feng starred with Zhu Zhu, Shi Yufei, and Yang Feiyang, in Raymond Yip's suspense thriller film Tales of Mystery.

In 2015, she had key supporting role in Flying Swords of Dragon Gate, a wuxia television series based on Tsui Hark's film of the same name.

In 2016, for her role as Guo Bing in Operation Mekong, Feng was nominated for Best Supporting Actress at the 34th Hundred Flowers Awards. In the following year, Feng earned her second Best Supporting Actress nomination at the 35th Hundred Flowers Awards for her performance in Project Gutenberg, and won Best Supporting Actress at the 1st Hainan Island International Film Festival.

Feng was cast as Eva in Undercover Punch and Gun, opposite Philip Ng, Vanness Wu and Andy On. That same year, she had a minor role in The Captain, which starred Zhang Hanyu, Yuan Quan, and Zhang Tian'ai.

In 2021, Feng made a guest appearance on Chiu Keng Guan's drama film On Your Mark. Feng was cast in the lead role of Xin Wei in the disaster film Chinese Doctors, directed by Andrew Lau.

== Filmography ==
=== Film ===
Year	English title	Chinese title	Role	Notes
2012	The Last Tycoon']	大上海	Ye Zhiqiu	
2015	Tales of Mystery	怪谈	Zhang Xiaoyun	
2015	Love Contractually	婚前合约	Vivian	
2015	Helios	赤道	Yuan Xiaowen	
2015	The Treasure	神秘宝藏	Tiffany	
2016	Operation Mekong	湄公河行动	Guo Bing	
2017	The Founding of an Army	建军大业	Peng Yuanhua	
2018	Please Remember Me	请你记住我	Cai Yun	
2018	Our Youth	我们的青春岁月	Feng Meimei	
2018	Project Gutenberg	无双	Xiu Qing	
2019	Undercover Punch and Gun	潜行者	Eva	
2019	The Captain	中国机长	Director	
2021	On Your Mark	了不起的老爸	Xing Yun	
2021	The Perfect Victim	完美受害人	Xin Qi	
2021	Chinese Doctors	中国医生	Xin Wei	

=== Television ===
Year	English title	Chinese title	Role	Notes
2013	The Lure of Cloud	云上的诱惑		
2015	Flying Swords of Dragon Gate	龙门飞甲	Su Huirong	
2017	Return to Me	爱归来	Lin Yu	
2017	On the Lightning	进击吧，闪电！	Bai Wushuang	
2018	Iron and Blood	铁血殊途	Qi Ying	
2019	Memories of Peking	芝麻胡同	Bao Feng	
2019	Blade Warrior	锻刀之绝地重生	Mei Yingsu	
2020	Black Lighthouse	黑色灯塔	Shi Yuqiu	
2020		石头开花	Peng Li	
2020	To Love	最初的相遇，最后的别离	Yan Shen	
2022	Be Reborn	重生之门	Su Ying	

== Film and TV Awards ==
Year	Nominated work	Award	Category	Result	Notes
2012	The Last Tycoon	Best New Performer	32nd Hong Kong Film Awards	Nominated	
2016	Operation Mekong	Best Supporting Actress	34th Hundred Flowers Awards	Nominated	
2017	Project Gutenberg	Best Supporting Actress	35th Hundred Flowers Awards	Nominated	
2018	Project Gutenberg	Best Supporting Actress	1st Hainan Island International Film Festival	Won	
