= Waiting Alone =

- Film poster
- Directed by: Dayyan Eng
- Written by: Dayyan Eng
- Produced by: Dayyan Eng
- Starring: Xia Yu; Li Bingbing; Gong Beibi
- Cinematography: Toby Oliver
- Edited by: Dayyan Eng
- Music by: Eric Lee Harper; Li Yanfei; Mao Mao; Saba Mohajerjasbi; Zhang Yang
- Production company: Colordance Pictures
- Release dates: 26 October 2004 (Tokyo International Film Festival); 8 September 2005 (China)
- Running time: 107 minutes
- Country: China
- Language: Mandarin

Waiting Alone (Chinese: 独自等待; pinyin: Dúzì Děngdài) is a 2004 Chinese romantic comedy film written and directed by Chinese-American filmmaker Dayyan Eng (Chinese: 伍仕贤; pinyin: Wǔ Shìxían), depicting the lives of a group of hip twenty-something Beijing residents. The film features Chinese movie stars Xia Yu, Gong Beibi, Li Bingbing, and Hong Kong superstar Chow Yun-fat in his first mainland Chinese film appearance. Waiting Alone was nominated for three Chinese academy awards (Golden Rooster Awards) including Best Picture - the first time a nomination was awarded to a foreign director in this category.

== Plot ==
Waiting Alone is a coming-of-age romantic comedy that follows Chen Wen, a young co-owner of a Beijing antique shop and an aspiring novelist. Told from his point of view, the story centers on his infatuation with Liu Rong, an up-and-coming actress whom he believes might be the perfect girl. Despite their growing closeness, Wen struggles to understand why she won't return his affections. With the help of his eccentric group of friends and his trusted confidante Li Jing, Wen navigates the challenges of modern relationships, romantic missteps, and self-discovery in a witty, grounded portrait of urban life and young adulthood in fast-changing China.

== Cast ==
- Xia Yu
- Li Bingbing
- Gong Beibi
- Gao Qi
- Wu Chao
- Gao Yalin
- Tu Songyan
- Dayyan Eng
- Li Lihong
- Yuan Quan (cameo)
- Chen Yufan (cameo)
- Ying Da (cameo)
- David Wu (cameo)
- Chow Yun-fat (cameo)

== Production ==
With this film, Eng made history as the first American to direct a Chinese feature film, and the first and only foreign director to date (as of 2024) to have a film nominated for Best Picture at the Chinese academy awards.

== Release ==
The film debuted at the 2004 Tokyo International Film Festival and was released in theaters in China in 2005.

Waiting Alone was acquired for international distribution in 2006 by Arclight Films, and subsequently became available on streamer platforms worldwide, including Amazon Prime.

== Reception ==
Positive reviews and word-of-mouth made this independent film a cult hit in China, where it was positively received by millennial audiences. The film also remains the highest-rated romantic comedy from China on Douban and other review sites (as of 2025).

New Cinema Magazine called it "The funniest Chinese-language film of 2005!" Variety wrote: "Waiting Alone provides honest laughter and touching moments as it invades the modern romantic comedy turf of Woody Allen and Nora Ephron. … All thesps show good comic timing, and Xia [Yu] is especially good as the lovelorn Chen and Gong Beibi also impresses as [Jing]. ...Will leave the cinema with a joyous bang."

=== Awards ===
- Best Picture Nomination (Dayyan Eng) - 2005 Golden Rooster Awards
- Best Actress Nomination (Li Bingbing) - 2005 Golden Rooster Awards
- Best Art Direction Nomination (Thomas Chong) - 2005 Golden Rooster Awards
- Best First Feature Award (Dayyan Eng) - 2005 Beijing College Students Film Festival
- Best Actor Award (Xia Yu) - 2005 Beijing College Students Film Festival
- Favorite Actress Nomination (Gong Beibi) - 2005 Beijing College Students Film Festival
- Favorite Actress (Li Bingbing) - 2005 Beijing College Students Film Festival
- Best New Director Nomination (Dayyan Eng) - 6th Chinese Film Media Awards
- Official Selection - 17th Tokyo International Film Festival
- Official Selection - 2006 Thessaloniki International Film Festival
- Official Selection - 2006 Hawaii International Film Festival
