= Shanghai (2010 film) =

2010 American film by Mikael Håfström

- Theatrical release poster
- Directed by: Mikael Håfström
- Written by: Hossein Amini
- Produced by: Mike Medavoy; Barry Mendel; Jake Myers; David U. Lee
- Starring: John Cusack; Gong Li; Chow Yun-fat; Franka Potente; Jeffrey Dean Morgan; Rinko Kikuchi; Benedict Wong; Hugh Bonneville; David Morse; Ken Watanabe
- Cinematography: Benoît Delhomme
- Edited by: Peter Boyle; Kevin Tent
- Music by: Klaus Badelt
- Production companies: Phoenix Pictures; Barry Mendel Productions
- Distributed by: The Weinstein Company
- Release dates: June 10, 2010 (Shanghai); October 2, 2015 (United States)
- Running time: 105 minutes
- Country: United States
- Language: English
- Budget: $50 million
- Box office: $15.3 million

Shanghai is a 2010 American neo-noir political thriller film directed by Mikael Håfström, starring John Cusack and Gong Li. It was released in China on June 17, 2010.

The film had a limited release in the United States on October 2, 2015 to negative reviews, with criticism for its direction and story. It also performed poorly at the box office.

== Plot ==
In December 1941, just before the entry of the United States into World War II, an American agent from the Naval Intelligence Office arrives in Shanghai to find his friend Conner was recently murdered. Determined to find out who killed Conner and why, he begins working at The Herald newspaper using the alias Paul Soames, a Nazi-sympathizer cover he used while stationed in Berlin. He meets Anthony Lan-Ting, an influential crime lord, and Captain Tanaka (Ken Watanabe) at the German embassy in Shanghai, during an invitation-only event. He later befriends Anthony when he saves him during an attack on Japanese officers by the Chinese Resistance at a night club.

Paul realizes that Anthony's wife, Anna, organized the attack and is the leader of the resistance. He then decides to help her pass on messages. After finally meeting up with Conner's contact in the Japanese Consulate, Paul finds out that Conner had an affair with a Japanese girl named Sumiko and after searching her home, uncovers numerous photos, which Conner took, in a darkroom nearby. Some of the photos include Captain Tanaka, other Japanese officers and the aircraft carrier Kaga.

Unconvinced that Sumiko betrayed Conner, he determines to find her and get answers. After a few more encounters with Anna, Anthony, Captain Tanaka, and investigating an opium house, Paul realizes that Sumiko was Captain Tanaka's lover and was seduced by Conner to spy for him. Paul's cover is blown when Conner's contact is arrested, and Paul is interrogated by Captain Tanaka regarding the whereabouts of Sumiko, whose location he does not know. After being released, Anna takes Paul to a safe house where she has been hiding Sumiko, who is on the verge of death due to opium withdrawal and other illnesses.

Anthony gives Captain Tanaka the location of the safe house to save Anna from arrest; inside the safe house, Tanaka informs Paul that the Japanese fleet started attacking Pearl Harbor one hour earlier and that the invasion of Shanghai is also underway. Tanaka admits to killing Conner, but only out of jealousy as he found out about his affair with Sumiko. A distraught Tanaka then asks for Paul's help in administering drugs to ease Sumiko's death. After Sumiko dies, everyone prepares to leave, but Tanaka wants to question Anna which infuriates Anthony, causing him to gun down Tanaka's bodyguards and seriously wound Tanaka himself. Before he can kill Tanaka, Anthony is fatally wounded by a dying bodyguard.

Leaving behind a wounded Tanaka, Paul drives the Lan-Tings away through the burning streets of Shanghai and with his last words, Anthony asks Paul to get Anna out of Shanghai, which he agrees to. Before getting on a ship to leave the city, Paul and Anna encounter Tanaka once again, but Tanaka does not acknowledge them. It is revealed later that both Paul and Anna, at some point, returned to Shanghai.

== Cast ==
- John Cusack as Paul Soames
- Gong Li as Anna Lan-Ting
- Chow Yun-fat as Anthony Lan-Ting
- Jeffrey Dean Morgan as Conner
- Ken Watanabe as Captain Tanaka (Japanese: 陸軍大尉田中, Rikugun-Tai-i Tanaka)
- Rinko Kikuchi as Sumiko
- David Morse as Richard Astor
- Franka Potente as Leni Müller
- Hugh Bonneville as Ben Sanger
- Andy On as Yum
- Race Wong as Cabaret performer
- Rosanne Wong as Cabaret performer
- Gemma Chan as Shin Shin
- Benedict Wong as Juso Kita
- Christopher Buchholz as Karl Müller
- Ronan Vibert as Mikey
- Nicholas Rowe as Ralph
- Don Tai as Lan-Ting's bodyguard (uncredited)
- Dean Alexandrou as Distraught husband (uncredited)

== Production ==
The film was originally intended to be shot on location in Shanghai. However, after the controversy resulting from the graphic sexual scenes in Ang Lee's film Lust, Caution, which had just been filmed in Shanghai and was set during the same period, The Weinstein Company's permits were revoked by the Chinese government in April 2008, after three months of pre-production work had been completed in Shanghai and only one week prior to the scheduled start of filming. Thus, the film crew had to relocate to the UK to film interiors and to Bangkok, Thailand, where an elaborate two-block set was built.

== Reception ==
Shanghai received negative reviews. Review aggregator Rotten Tomatoes gives the film a 4% score, an average rating of 4.2/10, based on 23 reviews. The site's consensus states: "Shanghai is crippled by a weak story and fatally undermined by clunky direction, making for a period political drama that lacks all of its key components." On Metacritic, the film holds a score of 36 out of 100, sampled from 14 critics, signifying "generally unfavorable reviews".
