= Conspirators (film) =

2013 Hong Kong film by Oxide Pang

- Film poster
- Directed by: Oxide Pang
- Screenplay by: Oxide Pang; Pang Pak-sing; Wu Mengzhang
- Produced by: Alvin Lam; Tong Choi-chi; Oxide Pang; Zhang Zhap; Tung Pui-man
- Starring: Aaron Kwok; Nick Cheung
- Cinematography: Decha Srimantra; Suen Wing-chueng
- Edited by: Curran Pang
- Music by: Payont Termsit; Ittichet Chawang
- Production companies: Universe Entertainment; Sun Entertainment Culture; Le Vision Pictures; Guangzhou City Ying Ming Culture Communication
- Distributed by: Universe Films Distribution
- Release date: 11 April 2013
- Running time: 90 minutes
- Country: Hong Kong
- Language: Cantonese
- Box office: HK$9,680,886

Conspirators (Chinese: 同謀) is a 2013 Hong Kong crime thriller film directed by Oxide Pang and starring Aaron Kwok and Nick Cheung. The film is a sequel to 2007 film, The Detective, and 2011's The Detective 2.

== Plot ==
Following the events of its predecessor, where Chan Tam discovers that his parents were murdered. Determined to find his parents' murderer, Tam takes a photo with him as a clue and travels to Malaysia and looks for Brother Chai. Chai reveals to Tam that his parents were drug traffickers and their death is also drug-related, telling him that he can obtain more clues from Uncle Bo and Fai. Tam was unable to accept the fact that his parents were drug traffickers. Later, Tam's house was burgled, where an object sitting in a dark shelf went missing. Tam suspects the object to be an important piece of evidence that is related to the death of his parents. Being a complete stranger in a foreign country, Tam hires a local private detective, Cheng Fung-hei, to assist him in the investigation.

Subsequently, both Tam and Fung-hei encountered attacks, while Chai disappeared and Bo was killed. Chai's adopted daughter, Chi-wai, believes that a certain object have fallen into the hands of Tai-kwan, who is currently at Chai's former residence in Guangzhou. To find out the truth, Tam proceeds to Guangzhou with Chi-wai, while Fung-hei continues his investigation in Malaysia. Later, Fung-hei receives a box of silent tape, which he hands to police officer Ma. At the same time, Tam also receives a box of Super 8 film and finds a password hidden in the film. Tam and Chi-wai return to Malaysia and split ways, with the former meeting up with Fung-hei while the latter hands the password to the police. However, Tam and Fung-hei were captured under the order of Tung Ching (Wang Jun), who was the murderer of Tam's parents. Ching also reveals the truth, where thirty years ago, he and Tam's parents set up a transportation company, which Ching uses to transport drugs. When Tam's parents discover this, they refuse to partake with Ching and intend to expose his criminal activities, and were killed by Ching.

After everything became clear, Ching intends to kill Tam and Fung-hei. At this time, Ching was suddenly shot. While attempting to flee by car, Ching was crushed to death by Fai and Bo's son. The former saves Tam and Fung-hei as he was helped by Tam's parents in the past, while the latter wanted to avenge his father. On the other hand, the police was able to retrieve evidence of Ching's criminal activities from the password and silent tape and successfully disintegrates his crime organization and drug manufacturer.

== Cast ==
- Aaron Kwok as Chan Tam
- Nick Cheung as Cheng Fung-hei / Cheng Pak-ho
- Jiang Yiyan as Chi-wai
- Li Chenhao as Officer Ma
- Chen Kuan-tai as Chai
- Ah Niu as Fai
- Lam Wai as Pang
- Wang Jun as Tung Ching
- Leung Nga-ko as Uncle Bo
- Terence Siufay as Little Bo
- Luk Ho-chuen as Tai-kwan
- Fauzi Nawawi as Zhen
