= Inseparable (film) =

- Film poster
- Directed by: Dayyan Eng
- Written by: Dayyan Eng
- Produced by: Dayyan Eng; David U. Lee
- Starring: Kevin Spacey; Daniel Wu; Gong Beibi; Yan Ni; Peter Stormare; Kenneth Tsang Kong
- Cinematography: Thierry Arbogast
- Edited by: Dayyan Eng
- Music by: Nathan Wang; Eric Lee Harper
- Production company: Colordance Pictures
- Distributed by: Fantawild Films
- Release dates: October 8, 2011 (Korea); May 4, 2012 (China)
- Countries: China; United States
- Languages: English; Mandarin

Inseparable (Chinese: 形影不离) is a 2011 film written and directed by Dayyan Eng. The dramedy/psychological suspense stars Kevin Spacey, Daniel Wu and Gong Beibi. Inseparable premiered in 2011 at the Busan International Film Festival and was released in China in May 2012. The film was selected by the Wall Street Journal as one of the "Top 10 Most Notable Asian Films" of 2011. Kevin Spacey's involvement made him the first Hollywood star to headline a 100% Chinese-funded film.

== Synopsis ==
Having gone through recent losses in his life, and having continued problems at work and at home with his investigative-reporter wife (Gong Beibi), Li (Daniel Wu) is befriended by a mysterious American expat (Kevin Spacey).

== Cast ==
Cast	Role
Kevin Spacey	Chuck
Daniel Wu	Li
Gong Beibi	Pang
Yan Ni	Ms. Yang
Kenneth Tsang	Mr. Wang
Zhang Mo	Sun Biao
Peter Stormare	Richard
Han Tongsheng	Officer Lin
