= Already Dead (film) =

- Directed by: Joe Otting
- Written by: Joe Chapelle (screenplay); Robert Lynn & David Alford (story)
- Produced by: Steven Squillante; Christopher Eberts; Colleen Griffen; David U. Lee; Jackie Olson
- Starring: Ron Eldard; Til Schweiger; Geoff Pierson; Marisa Coughlan; Christopher Plummer
- Cinematography: Eric Trageser
- Edited by: Adam Sobocienski
- Music by: Nathan Furst
- Distributed by: Havenwood Media
- Release date: January 15, 2008
- Country: United States
- Language: English
- Box office: $2,500,000

Already Dead is a 2008 drama film directed by Joe Otting and starring Ron Eldard and Christopher Plummer. Filming took place in Los Angeles, California.

== Plot ==
Thomas Archer (Ron Eldard), a disconsolate man, is led to an underground room by a distorted male voice on his mobile phone. In flashback it is shown that his wife had been attacked and his son killed for no apparent reason. When he reaches the underground room he finds a man hooded and tied to a chair and told by the distorted voice that this is the man responsible for the attacks. Without any proof he accepts everything he is told and proceeds to torture the man with various implements found in the room. After a while Archer realizes that this may not be the man responsible for the attacks. Against the orders of the voice he questions the man. They then collaborate in an attempt to escape what they now see as a situation in which the lives of both of them are at risk. It is revealed in flashback that his Doctor (Christopher Plummer) had made Archer an offer to get the revenge he needs. The doctor now reappears and tries to insist that Archer "finish it, and take back your life".

== Cast ==
- Ron Eldard ... Thomas Archer
- Til Schweiger ... The Man
- Patrick Kilpatrick ... The Detective
- Geoff Pierson ... Pierce
- Marisa Coughlan ... Sarah Archer
- Christopher Plummer ... Dr. Heller
