= List of accolades received by The Sixth Sense =

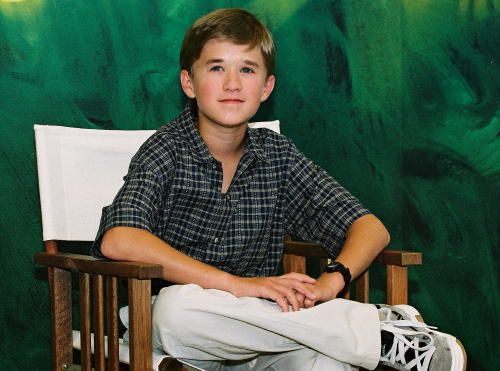
- Haley Joel Osment, nominated for over a dozen awards for his performance as Cole Sear
- Total number of wins and nominations
Totals	17	41
- References

The Sixth Sense is an American supernatural thriller film, written and directed by M. Night Shyamalan. The film was released on August 6, 1999, grossing over $26,600,000 on its opening weekend and ranking first place at the box office. Overall the film grossed over $293,500,000 domestically and $672,800,000 worldwide, which is approximately 16.8 times its budget of $40 million. The Sixth Sense was well received by critics, with an approval rating of 85% from review aggregator Rotten Tomatoes.

The film has received numerous awards and nominations, with nomination categories ranging from those honoring the film itself (Best Film), to its writing, editing, and direction (Best Direction, Best Editing, Best Original Screenplay), to its cast's performance (Best Actor / Actress). Especially lauded was the supporting role of actor Haley Joel Osment, whose nominations include an Academy Award, a Broadcast Film Critics Association Award, and a Golden Globe Award. Overall, The Sixth Sense was nominated for six Academy Awards and four British Academy Film Awards, but won none. The film received three nominations from the People's Choice Awards and won all of them, with lead actor Bruce Willis being honored for his role. The Satellite Awards nominated the film in four categories, with awards given for writing (M. Night Shyamalan) and editing (Andrew Mondshein). Supporting actress Toni Collette was nominated for both an Academy Award and a Satellite award for her role in the film. James Newton Howard was honored by the American Society of Composers, Authors and Publishers for his composition of the music for the film.

== Awards and nominations ==
Award	Date of ceremony	Category	Recipients and nominees	Outcome
Academy Award	March 26, 2000	Best Picture	Frank Marshall, Kathleen Kennedy, and Barry Mendel	Nominated
Academy Award	March 26, 2000	Best Director	M. Night Shyamalan	Nominated
Academy Award	March 26, 2000	Best Supporting Actor	Haley Joel Osment	Nominated
Academy Award	March 26, 2000	Best Supporting Actress	Toni Collette	Nominated
Academy Award	March 26, 2000	Best Original Screenplay	M. Night Shyamalan	Nominated
Academy Award	March 26, 2000	Best Film Editing	Andrew Mondshein	Nominated
American Society of Cinematographers	February 20, 2000	Outstanding Achievement in Cinematography in Theatrical Releases	Tak Fujimoto	Nominated
ASCAP Film & Television Music Awards	April 25, 2000	Top Box Office Films	James Newton Howard	Won
Bram Stoker Award	2000	Best Screenplay	M. Night Shyamalan	Won
British Academy Film Awards	April 9, 2000	Best Film		Nominated
British Academy Film Awards	April 9, 2000	Best Original Screenplay	M. Night Shyamalan	Nominated
British Academy Film Awards	April 9, 2000	Best Editing	Andrew Mondshein	Nominated
British Academy Film Awards	April 9, 2000	The David Lean Award for achievement in Direction	M. Night Shyamalan	Nominated
Broadcast Film Critics Association Award	January 24, 2000	Best Picture		Nominated
Broadcast Film Critics Association Award	January 24, 2000	Top 10 Films		8th place
Broadcast Film Critics Association Award	January 24, 2000	Best Young Performer	Haley Joel Osment	Won
Empire Awards	February 17, 2000	Best Director	M. Night Shyamalan	Won
Florida Film Critics Circle Awards	January 9, 2000	Best Supporting Actor	Haley Joel Osment	Won
Golden Globe Award	January 23, 2000	Best Supporting Actor	Haley Joel Osment	Nominated
Golden Globe Award	January 23, 2000	Best Screenplay	M. Night Shyamalan	Nominated
Hugo Award	September 2, 2000	Best Dramatic Presentation		Nominated
Kansas City Film Critics Circle Awards	January 19, 2000	Best Supporting Actor	Haley Joel Osment	Won
Las Vegas Film Critics Society Awards	January 18, 2000	Best Supporting Actor	Haley Joel Osment	Won
Las Vegas Film Critics Society Awards	January 18, 2000	Most Promising Actor	Haley Joel Osment	Won
Las Vegas Film Critics Society Awards	January 18, 2000	Youth in Film Award	Haley Joel Osment	Won
MTV Movie Awards	June 3, 2000	Best Movie		Nominated
MTV Movie Awards	June 3, 2000	Best Male Performance	Bruce Willis	Nominated
MTV Movie Awards	June 3, 2000	Best Male Breakthrough Performance	Haley Joel Osment	Won
MTV Movie Awards	June 3, 2000	Best On-Screen Duo	Bruce Willis and Haley Joel Osment	Nominated
Nebula Award	May 20, 2000	Best Script	M. Night Shyamalan	Won
Online Film Critics Society Awards	January 2, 2000	Best Original Screenplay	M. Night Shyamalan	Nominated
Online Film Critics Society Awards	January 2, 2000	Best Supporting Actor	Haley Joel Osment	Won
Online Film Critics Society Awards	January 2, 2000	Best Debut	Haley Joel Osment	Nominated
People's Choice Awards	January 9, 2000	Favorite Motion Picture		Won
People's Choice Awards	January 9, 2000	Favorite Dramatic Motion Picture		Won
People's Choice Awards	January 9, 2000	Favorite Motion Picture Actor	Bruce Willis	Won
Satellite Award	January 16, 2000	Best Supporting Actress	Toni Collette	Nominated
Satellite Award	January 16, 2000	Best Original Screenplay	M. Night Shyamalan	Won
Satellite Award	January 16, 2000	Best Film Editing	Andrew Mondshein	Won
Satellite Award	January 16, 2000	Best Sound	Allan Byer, Michael Kirchberger	Nominated
Saturn Award	June 6, 2000	Best Horror Film		Won
Saturn Award	June 6, 2000	Best Writing	M. Night Shyamalan	Nominated
Saturn Award	June 6, 2000	Best Actor	Bruce Willis	Nominated
Saturn Award	June 6, 2000	Best Young Actor/Actress	Haley Joel Osment	Won
Screen Actors Guild Award	March 12, 2000	Outstanding Performance by a Male Actor in a Supporting Role	Haley Joel Osment	Nominated
Writers Guild of America Award	March 5, 2000	Best Original Screenplay	M. Night Shyamalan	Nominated
