= On Your Mark (film) =

- 了不起的老爸
- Directed by: Chiu Keng Guan
- Screenplay by: Xu Yizhou (徐逸洲)
- Produced by: Sun Jishun (孙吉顺); Wang Lianjing (王莲菁); Sun Jiwen (孙霁雯)
- Starring: Wang Yanhui; Zhang Youhao; Gong Beibi
- Release date: 18 June 2021
- Country: China
- Language: Standard Chinese

On Your Mark (Chinese: 了不起的老爸; pinyin: Liǎobuqǐ de Lǎobà; lit. 'amazing dad') is a 2021 Chinese drama film directed by Chiu Keng Guan and starring Wang Yanhui, Zhang Youhao, and Gong Beibi.

== Plot ==
The film follows the story of a father and son who participate in a marathon and thus come to understand and improve themselves.

== Cast ==
- Wang Yanhui as Xiao Daming
- Zhang Youhao as Xiao Erdong
- Gong Beibi as Xia Lu
- Li Xiaopang (李小胖)
- He Nan (鹤男)
- Zhao Liang (赵亮)
- Li Yu (李彧)
- Liu Jinshan
- Feng Wenjuan

== Production ==
The film was shot in Chongqing. Filming took 55 days.

== Release ==
The film was released on 18 June 2021, just before Father's Day.

== Reception ==
On the day of its release, On Your Mark was the top-earning film in the Chinese box office. As of 27 June 2021, the film's box office total was 105 million RMB.

Critic Derek Elley called it "a disease-of-the-week melodrama grafted onto a dysfunction". He criticized the screenwriting and directing but praised Wang Yanhui's performance.

== See also ==
- Never Stop (film)
