= Yan Qingyu =

Chinese actress

- 阎青妤
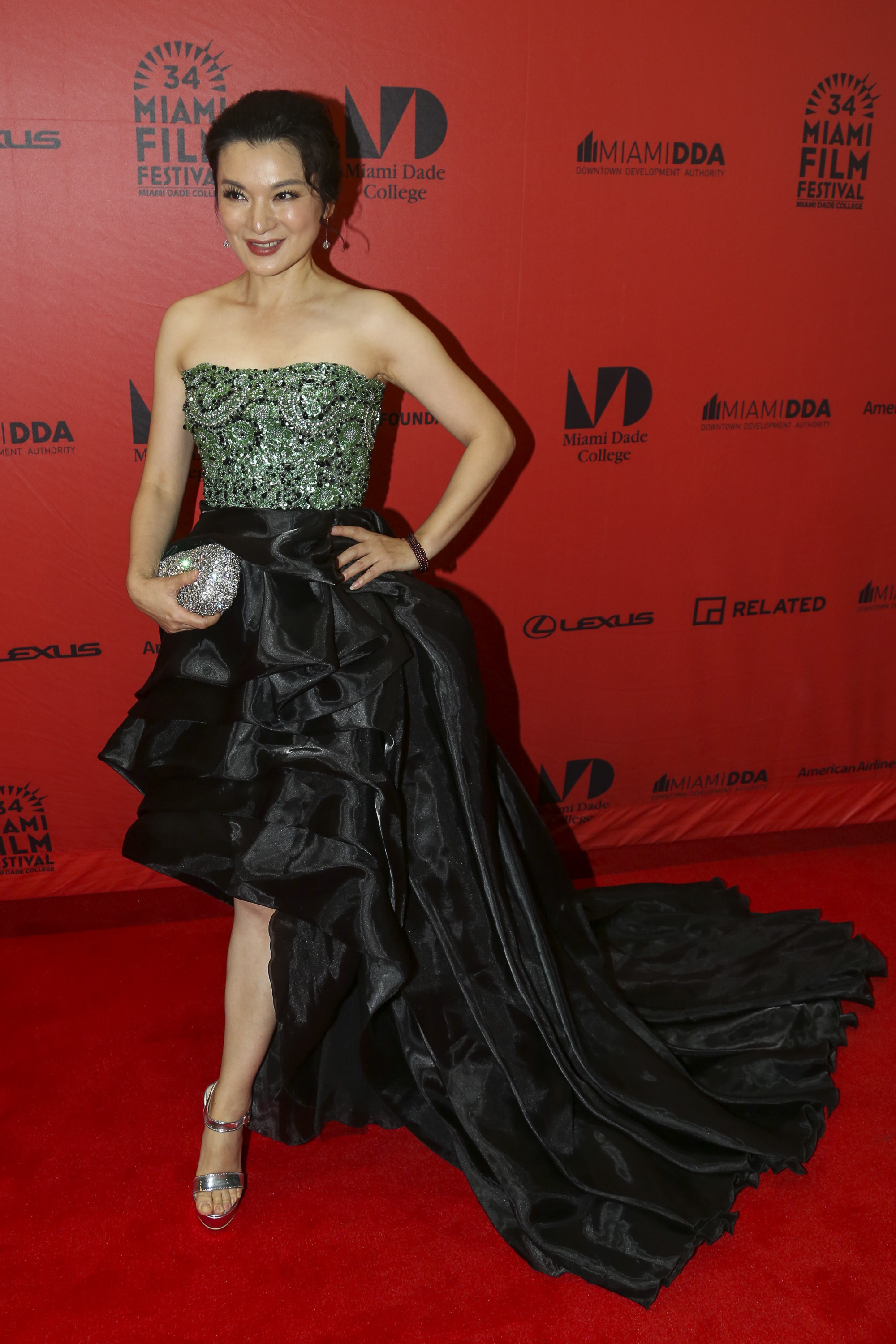
- Yan Qingyu at 2017 MIFF.
- Born: Yan Qing (阎青); May 4, 1966 (age 60); Xicheng District, Beijing, China
- Education: China Social University
- Occupation: Actress
- Years active: 1982–present
- Agent(s): Tianhe Brothers Television and Film Investment Co., Ltd.

Chinese name
- Traditional Chinese: 閻青妤
- Simplified Chinese: 阎青妤
Transcriptions
Standard Mandarin
- Hanyu Pinyin: Yán Qīngyú

Yan Qingyu (Chinese: 阎青妤; born 4 May 1966) is a Chinese actress best known for her roles in Divorce Contract (1990), Keeping Moon at Heart (2000), The Heaven Sword and Dragon Saber (2003) and The Demi-Gods and Semi-Devils (2013).

== Early life and education ==
Yan was born in Xicheng District, Beijing, on May 4, 1966, to a military family, while her ancestral home in Shandong. She was raised in Sichuan. She graduated from the China Social University.

== Acting career ==
Yan began her career with guest roles in two historical films, including Reign Behind a Curtain (1982) and The Burning of Imperial Palace (1982).

In 1986, she appeared as Xue Baochan in Wang Fulin's Dream of the Red Chamber, adapted from Cao Xueqin's classical novel of the same title, the series was one of the most watched ones in mainland China in that year. .

Yan portrayed Concubine Hui in The Empress Dowager (1988), which was set to premiere in 1988. In the following year, she was cast as Sun Lanxiang in Ordinary World, based on the novel by the same name by Lu Yao.

In 1991, she played the role of Yue Rong, a singer, in the film Divorce Contract, for which she received a Best Supporting Actress nomination at the 14th Hundred Flowers Awards.

In 1998, Yan played a supporting role in the wuxia television series The Return of the Condor Heroes, starring Richie Ren and Jacklyn Wu and directed by Young Pei-pei. The TV drama is an adaptation based on the novel of the same name by Hong Kong novelist Jin Yong. In the following year, she had a supporting role in The Legendary Siblings, based on the novel by the same name by Taiwanese novelist Gu Long.

In 2001, she earned a Best Supporting Actress at the 24th Hundred Flowers Awards for her performance as Zhao Yuelan in Keeping Moon at Heart.

Yan had a supporting role in The Heaven Sword and Dragon Saber (2003), a wuxia television series starring Alec Su, Alyssa Chia and Gao Yuanyuan. The Television series adaptation based on the novel of the same name by Jin Yong.

In 2010, she appeared in Pepper and Pickles, a romantic comedy television series starring Xie Na and Kang Ta.

Yan was cast in the historical comedy The Smart Kongkong, playing the wife of Pan Changjiang's character.

In 2014, she had key supporting role in The Demi-Gods and Semi-Devils, adapted from Jin Yong's novel of the same title.

Yan participated in Le Coup de Foudre, a web series based on the novel I Don't Like This World, I Only Like You by Qiao Yi.

== Filmography ==
=== Film ===
Year	English title	Chinese title	Role	Notes
1982	Reign Behind a Curtain	垂帘听政	Shuang Xi	
1982	The Burning of Imperial Palace	火烧圆明园	Shuang Xi	
1985		未完成的处女作	Lin Ying	
1986	Zhen Zhen's Hair Salon	珍珍的发屋	Miao Miao	
1988	The Empress Dowager	一代妖后	Concubine Hui	
1988	Desperate Songstress	疯狂歌女	Xiao He	
1988	AIDS Patient	艾滋病患者	Ji Yin	
1990	Wolf and Angel	恶狼与天使	Lin Anqi	
1990	Divorce Contract	离婚合同	Yue Rong	
1991	Police Heroes	警界英雄	Ge Shan	
1991	Weekend Love Corner	周末恋爱角	Bailingniao	
1991	Topsky	远行者	Dan Ling	
1992	Kiss of Poison	毒吻	Lin Nan	
1993	Legend of the Emperor Yan	炎帝传奇	Witch	
2000	Keeping Moon at Heart	留住心中的月亮	Zhao Yuelan	
2001	Hot Soil in Spring	春天的热土	Sister Ju	
2006		况钟传奇之明月几时		
2007		天生神探之数码秘密	Aunt Wu	
2009	Pear Blossoms	梨树花开	Li Hua	
2013	The Tail of Childhood	童年的尾巴	Mother Du	

=== Television ===
Year	English title	Chinese title	Role	Notes
1984		家里的人	Sister Qi	
1984	Rainbow	虹	He Ying	
1986	Dream of the Red Chamber	红楼梦	Xue Baochan	
1986	Personal Emotions	个人情感	Lu Ling	
1986	The Bending Niangniang River	弯弯的娘娘河	Xiu Xiu	
1986		北飞行动	Liu Qiongqiong	
1987	The Mystery of the Deep Mind	心灵深处的奥秘	Ling Ling	
1987	The Story of Love	爱的故事	Xiao Huang	
1987	Mother	妈妈	Li Juan	
1988	Red Cross under the Army	军旗下的红十字	Xiao Xue	
1988	Songs in the Ruins	废墟中的歌	Xiao Fang	
1988		香港豪门风流	Han Xiao	
1989	The Impulse of Youth	青春的冲动	Announcer	
1989	Ordinary World	平凡的世界	Sun Lanxiang	
1989	Blue Vortex	蓝色的漩涡	Ye Zi	
1989		津浦路大劫案	Hei Ni	
1989	The Gold Secret Channel	黄金秘密通道	Lin Hai	
1989	No.3 Female Prison	三号女监房	Lu Ya	
1990		猎杀圈	Zheng Jianhong	
1990	Police Officer	片儿警	Mao Mao	
1991	The Editorial Stories	编辑部的故事	Miss Sun	
1992	Hippocampus Song and Dance Hall	海马歌舞厅	Guest	
1992	Jasmine Magnolia	皎皎白玉兰	Xia Ye	
1992	The Shirt with Pearls	珍珠衫		
1994	The District	特区刑警		
1994	Beauty Salon	美容院	Zhao Shan	
1995	This Present Life	今生今世	Shen Ruhua	
1995		学车记	Liu Shuang	
1995		姐姐妹妹闯北京		
1996	Sun Tzu's Art of War	孙子兵法	Xiao Die	
1996		东南西北中发白	Meng Yi	
1997		火烧阿房宫	Jizi	
1997		东方风云	Huang Biyun	
1997	snuff bottle	烟壶	Su San	
1998		逃之恋	Wu Qiuhong	
1998	The Return of the Condor Heroes	神雕侠侣	Qiu Qianchi	
1998	Spring Festival	在外过年		
1998	Two Tolerances in Suzhou	苏州二公差	Hua Feng	
1999	The Legendary Siblings	绝代双骄	An Ku	
2000	Women Soldiers on the 38th Front	三八线上的女兵	Sun Nana	
2001	The Red and Black	红与黑	Cai Yawen	
2002	The Heaven Sword and Dragon Saber	倚天屠龙记	Grandma Jinhua	
2002	The Winter Solstice	冬至	Liao Xiaoqiong	
2003	Do Not Abandon This Life	不弃今生	Yu Youyun	
2004	Blood-dripping Rhododendron	滴血杜鹃	Miss Yue	
2005	Golden Vase	金瓶少女	Wang Sanqiao	
2005	Girls' Diary	女生日记	Mother Wu	
2005	Beautiful Women Also Worry About Marriage	美女也愁嫁	Lin Haiyun	
2005	Paris Love Song	巴黎恋歌	Wang Qian	
2006	Home and Everything Happy	家和万事兴之抬头见喜	Qin Wanfang	
2007	Strangers When We Meet	相逢何必曾相识	Yang Laidi	
2007	A Gentleman's Good Mate	君子好逑	Mrs. Sha	
2009	Registered Residence	户口	Aunt	
2009	Born in 1949	生于1949	Shen Zhujun	
2010	Daddy Don't Leave	爸爸别走	Zhao Yinhua	
2010	Pepper and Pickles	辣椒与泡菜	Aunt	
2010	Snowy Sky Road	雪域天路	Fang Yuxia	
2010	The Enemy Approached the Walls	兵临城下	Anut Qin	
2010	Chinese Land	中国地	Tao Hua	
2012	Different Town	异镇	Anut Wang	
2012	A Happy Life of My Mother-in-law	岳母的幸福生活	Du Mei	
2012		玫瑰炒肉丝	Wan Xiaorong	
2012	The Smart Kongkong	聪明的小空空	Wife of the Magistrate	
2013	Warm Days	温暖的日子	Li Fengru	
2014	The Demi-Gods and Semi-Devils	天龙八部	Dao Baifeng	
2015	Liu Bowen	神机妙算刘伯温	Zhao Dongni	
2019	Le Coup de Foudre	我只喜欢你		

== Film and TV Awards ==
Year	Nominated work	Award	Category	Result	Notes
1991	Divorce Contract	14th Hundred Flowers Awards	Best Supporting Actress	Nominated	
2001	Keeping Moon at Heart	24th Hundred Flowers Awards	Best Supporting Actress	Won	
