= 34th Hundred Flowers Awards =

Chinese film awards ceremony in 2018

34thth Hundred Flowers Awards
- Date: November 10, 2018
- Site: Foshan, Guangdong, China
- Organized by: China Film Association

Highlights
- Best Feature Film: Operation Red Sea
- Best Direction: Dante Lam; Operation Red Sea
- Best Actor: Wu Jing; Wolf Warrior 2
- Best Actress: Chen Jin; Hold Your Hands

Television coverage
- Network: CCTV

The 34th Hundred Flowers Awards was held on November 10, 2018, in Foshan, Guangdong, China, with Dante Lam's Operation Red Sea winning big at the gala.

== Winners and nominees ==
Best Picture	Best Director
Operation Red Sea; The Founding of an Army; Wolf Warrior 2; Detective Chinatown 2; Soul Mate	Dante Lam for Operation Red Sea; Wu Jing for Wolf Warrior 2; Chen Sicheng for Detective Chinatown 2; Dante Lam for Operation Mekong; Derek Tsang for Soul Mate
Best Writing	Best Newcomer
Lam Wing Sum/ Li Yuan/ Xu Yimeng/ Wu Nan for Soul Mate; Wu Jing/ Dong Qun/ Liu Yi for Wolf Warrior 2; Chen Sicheng for Detective Chinatown 2; Dante Lam/ Feng Ji/ Chen Zhuzhu/ Lin Mingjie Operation Red Sea; Dante Lam/ Zhu Jingqi/ Liu Xiaoqun/ Tan Huizhen/ Lin Mingjie for Operation Mekong	Wang Yutian for Operation Red Sea; Li Chengbin for Soul Mate; Shang Yuxian for Detective Chinatown 2; Huang Jingyu for Operation Red Sea
Best Actor	Best Actress
Wu Jing for Wolf Warrior 2; Zhu Yawen for The Founding of an Army; Liu Haoran for Detective Chinatown 2; Zhang Yi for Operation Red Sea; Zhang Hanyu for Operation Mekong	Chen Jin for Hold Your Hands; Ma Sichun for Soul Mate; Li Qin for The Founding of an Army; Zhou Dongyu for Soul Mate; Hai Qing for Operation Red Sea
Best Supporting Actor	Best Supporting Actress
Du Jiang for Operation Red Sea; Ma Tianyu for The Founding of an Army; Wu Gang for Wolf Warrior 2; Hans Zhang for Wolf Warrior 2; Zhang Hanyu for Operation Red Sea	Jiang Luxia for Operation Red Sea; Feng Wenjuan for Operation Mekong; Li Haofang for Soul Mate; Zhang Tian'ai for The Founding of an Army
Outstanding Film
The Founding of an Army
