= The Detective 2 =

2011 Hong Kong film by Oxide Pang

- Film poster
- Traditional Chinese: B+偵探
- Simplified Chinese: B+侦探
- Hanyu Pinyin: B Jiā Zhēn Tàn
- Jyutping: B Gaa1 Zing1 Taam3
- Directed by: Oxide Pang
- Screenplay by: Oxide Pang; Pang Pak-sing
- Produced by: Oxide Pang; Danny Pang
- Starring: Aaron Kwok; Liu Kai-chi; Patrick Tam; Cheung Siu-fai; Gong Beibi
- Cinematography: Decha Srimantra
- Edited by: Curran Pang
- Music by: Payont Termsit
- Production companies: Sil-Metropole Organisation; Beijing Enlight Pictures; Le Vision Pictures
- Distributed by: Universe Films Distribution Company
- Release date: 12 May 2011
- Running time: 100 minutes
- Country: Hong Kong
- Languages: Cantonese; Mandarin; Thai
- Box office: US$1,119,052

The Detective 2 is a 2011 Hong Kong thriller film directed by Oxide Pang and starring Aaron Kwok. It is the sequel to 2007's The Detective. The film was followed by a sequel, Conspirators, released in 2013.

== Synopsis ==
Bumbling private detective Chan Tam (Aaron Kwok) is enlisted by police pal Fung Chak (Liu Kai-chi) to help in the investigation of a serial murder case. The victims – a middle-aged man killed at home, a dead woman found in the trash dump, and a teenage girl slain in the park – were all killed in grisly manners, but they didn't seem related to each other. Without any clue to follow up on, Tam is decidedly at his wits' end. But when Chak is seriously wounded by a mysterious assailant, Tam deduces that the only way to uncover the truth is to get into the mind of the deranged killer, and in so doing he is forced to face a long-hidden side of himself.

== Cast ==
- Aaron Kwok as Tam
- Liu Kai-chi as Inspector Fung Chak
- Patrick Tam as Inspector Lo
- Cheung Siu-fai as Leung Wai Yip
- Gong Beibi as Ling Ho-yee
- Izz Xu as Ling Ka-fai

== Release ==
The film was released in Hong Kong on 12 May 2011.
