= The Return of the Condor Heroes (disambiguation) =

The Return of the Condor Heroes, known in Chinese as Shen Diao Xia Lü (or Shendiao Xialü), is a novel by Jin Yong. Alternate English translations of the title include The Giant Eagle and Its Companion and Divine Eagle, Chivalric Companion.

The Return of the Condor Heroes may refer to:

- Films adapted from the novel:
  - The Story of the Great Heroes, a four-part Hong Kong film released in 1960 and 1961
  - The Brave Archer and His Mate, a 1982 Hong Kong film
  - Little Dragon Maiden, a 1983 Hong Kong film
- Television series adapted from the novel:
  - The Return of the Condor Heroes (1976 TV series), a 1976 Hong Kong television series
  - The Return of the Condor Heroes (1983 TV series), a 1983 Hong Kong television series
  - The Return of the Condor Heroes (1984 TV series), a 1984 Taiwanese television series
  - The Condor Heroes 95, a 1995 Hong Kong television series
  - The Return of the Condor Heroes (Singaporean TV series), a 1998 Singaporean television series
  - The Return of the Condor Heroes (1998 Taiwanese TV series), a 1998 Taiwanese television series
  - Legend of the Condor Hero (anime), a 2001 Japanese animated television series
  - The Return of the Condor Heroes (2006 TV series), a 2006 Chinese television series
  - The Romance of the Condor Heroes, a 2014 Chinese television series
- Others:
  - Saviour of the Soul, a 1991 Hong Kong film
  - Saviour of the Soul 2, a 1992 Hong Kong film
  - The Condor Heroes Return, a 1993 Hong Kong television series loosely based on two characters from the novel

== See also ==
- The Legend of the Condor Heroes (disambiguation)
