= Wang Lin (qigong master) =

Chinese Qigong master

- 王林
- Born: May 6, 1952; Luxi County, Jiangxi, China
- Died: February 10, 2017 (aged 64); Nanchang, Jiangxi, China
- Citizenship: Hong Kong
- Occupation: Qigong master
- Criminal charges: Illegal medicine practice, bigamy, fraud, tax evasion, bribery, gambling, illegal possession of firearms

Wang Lin (Chinese: 王林; pinyin: Wáng Lín; 6 May 1952 – 10 February 2017) was a Chinese qigong and psi practitioner. A local personality in Pingxiang, Jiangxi since the 1990s, he gained national notoriety after being exposed by The Beijing News in July 2013 for his frauds as well as his connections with officials and celebrities. After the exposé, Wang fled to Hong Kong for one year and returned to Pingxiang in June 2014. In 2015, Wang was taken away by the police on suspicion of kidnapping and murdering one of his former disciples. In February 2017, Wang died after multiple organ failure while he was on bail for medical treatment.

== Career ==
Wang left home at seven years old and studied in Mount Emei. After his studies he was sent to the countryside due to the Cultural Revolution. Later he was sent to prison charged with "destroying agriculture". After the Cultural Revolution, he was released from prison and then opened his own business in Shenzhen until he received a Hong Kong permanent resident identity card. During the qigong craze of the 1990s, Wang rose to prominence through his demonstrations of alleged supernatural powers. He claimed to have treated numerous foreign dignitaries and business tycoons, and his followers included high-ranking government officials, wealthy businessmen, and celebrities, such as Jackie Chan, Jet Li, Suharto, Zhao Wei, Faye Wong, Li Bingbing, Jack Ma and Liu Zhijun. He was purportedly the richest man in Pingxiang and built the residence "Wang Palace".

In 2002, Wang met businessman Zou Yong, and the two developed a close relationship. In 2006, Wang helped Zou secure a lucrative business deal through Liu Zhijun, then the Railway Minister of China, but their relationship soured around 2012, leading to legal and economic disputes. On 9 July 2015, Zou was found kidnapped and murdered, for which Wang was later arrested. In November of the next year, Wang was indicted on charges of illegal detention, fraud, illegal possession of firearms, and bribery. While awaiting trial, Wang died on 10 February 2017, due to multiple organ failure resulting from ANCA-associated vasculitis and autoimmune peripheral neuropathy.
