= Bus 44 =

2001 film by Dayyan Eng

- Film poster
- Directed by: Dayyan Eng
- Written by: Dayyan Eng
- Produced by: Dayyan Eng
- Starring: Gong Beibi; Wu Chao; Li Yixiang
- Cinematography: Sam Koa
- Edited by: Dayyan Eng
- Music by: Zhang Yang
- Distributed by: Colordance Pictures
- Release date: 2001
- Running time: 11 minutes
- Countries: Hong Kong; United States
- Language: Mandarin

Bus 44 (simplified Chinese: 车四十四; traditional Chinese: 車四十四; pinyin: Chē Sì Shí Sì; Jyutping: Ce1 Sei3 Sap6 Sei3) is a Venice and Sundance Film Festival award-winning short film written and directed by Chinese-American filmmaker Dayyan Eng in 2001, starring Chinese film star Gong Beibi and Wu Chao. Bus 44 takes place on the outskirts of a small town and tells the story of a bus driver (Gong) and her passengers' encounter with highway robbers. The film was loosely based on an amalgamation of supposed true events, though there has never been any verified source.

== Plot ==
A young man boards a bus on a remote road and makes conversation with the female driver. The bus stops for two men, one of whom is doubled over, appearing sick. Upon boarding, the two men reveal that they are robbers armed with knives and they demand that the passengers surrender their belongings. The driver attempts to intervene when one man ignores the robbers' demands, but they beat him. They also drag the bus driver out of the bus and begin raping her.

Some passengers watch the events unfold while others remain indifferent. The young man who boarded earlier attempts to rally the passengers to help the driver, but none will assist him. He confronts the robbers alone, but is slashed in the leg and incapacitated. The robbers leave the scene and the bloodied driver returns to the bus. When the young man tries to board again, she refuses him. He pleads that he was the only passenger that tried to help, but she returns his bag and closes the door before he can board. After hitching a ride from a motorist, the young man notices several police cars along the road. He eventually comes upon the scene of a wreck, where a police officer reveals that the driver has driven the bus down a cliff, killing herself and all the other passengers.

== Production ==
Bus 44 was director Dayyang Eng's first professional short film. It was shot on 35mm film stock with a small cast and crew on the outskirts of Beijing in 2001.

Commenting on the film, the director stated, "I have always been interested in social psychology and wanted to do a film about how people react under certain stressful circumstances. The story attracts me not only because it has an interesting plot with a twist, but mostly because the underlying theme is even more haunting than the events that take place. I intentionally made this film with a certain ambiguity of time and place -- this story could have taken place anywhere in the world. Making films about people and human nature attracts me because I feel that people around the world have much more in common than they do differences. "Bus 44" carries a universal theme that travels across all boundaries and societies, trespassing the dark side and bright side of human behavior."

== Reception and legacy ==
Bus 44 The film was covered extensively in the Chinese media and was critically acclaimed in Asia, United States and Europe gaining TV and theatrical distribution in territories worldwide. The film won awards at Venice Film Festival, Sundance Film Festival, and was invited to Cannes Film Festival the first time a Chinese-language short film won in all three festivals' history.

Bus 44 has been viewed by millions of people around the world on TV, in theaters, and online. In China and Korea, the film has been widely available online since its debut, and on YouTube alone, the film has garnered over 5 million views.

== Awards ==
- Special Jury Award - 2001 Venice Film Festival
- Jury Honorable Mention - 2002 Sundance Film Festival
- Directors' Fortnight - 2002 Cannes Film Festival
- Grand Jury Award - 2002 Florida Film Festival
- Official Selection - 2003 New York Film Festival
- Official Selection - 2002 Clermont-Ferrand International Short Film Festival
- Official Selection - 2002 Hong Kong International Film Festival
- Official Selection - 2002 Seattle International Film Festival
- Official Selection - 2002 Toronto Worldwide Short Film Festival
- Official Selection - 2002 Edinburgh International Film Festival
- Official Selection - 2001 Pusan International Film Festival
- Official Selection - 2001 Gijon International Film Festival
