= I Do (2012 Chinese film) =

- Film poster
- Traditional Chinese: 我願意
- Simplified Chinese: 我愿意
- Hanyu Pinyin: Wǒ Yuànyì
- Directed by: Sun Zhou
- Written by: Chen Tong; Sun Zhou
- Produced by: Zhang Weiping; Fang Yingchun; Han Xiaoli; Mu Yan; Peng Mingyu; Qian Zhongyuan; Xue Shuai
- Starring: Li Bingbing; Sun Honglei; Duan Yihong
- Cinematography: Peter Pau
- Music by: Cyril Morin; Thomas Mercier
- Production companies: Beijing Phoenix Entertainment Co. China Film Group Corporation
- Distributed by: China Film Group Corporation
- Release date: 10 February 2012
- Running time: 106 minutes
- Country: China
- Language: Mandarin

I Do is a 2012 Chinese film directed by Sun Zhou, Starring Li Bingbing, Sun Honglei, Duan Yihong, Xue Jianing, Zhang Wei.

== Plot ==
Tang Weiwei is a beautiful yet single (over 30) successful designer. She met Yang Nianhua while her friend set up several dates per five minutes one after another. She pretends to be pregnant to solve the problem and Yang Nianhua who is at least 7 years older than her, falls for her way of handling the situation. But her ex-lover (Wang Yang) Jim comes back being rich after seven years to win her back. They had a good relationship but due to financial crisis they had fought and Jim disappeared without saying anything, while Jim thought being poor was the reason of the end of their relation, Tiang thought the dream was the most important thing but it should not be a burden to others. Tang misunderstands that she slept with Yang and it leads to some funny occurrence. After some heart to heart events at last they reconcile their relationship. Then Jim loses money in business and Tang works hard to help him but Yang Nianhua does not see it in a good way. It is revealed that Yang Nianhua is the chairman of Sansheng Group and he buys the company to help Jim. Tang feels that he cheated her from the beginning by lying to her being poor and about his past. But Yang Nianhua tells her that he wanted to find true love not someone greedy of his wealth and all he did was for her. He just hid his fortune but she would hide her heart if she walked away. He would always be with her no matter which life-style she chooses. Then while walking Jim says that we will help each other in business but in case of love who is the winner is yet to be decided. When asked Tang replies to Yang to use the way of a rich man to love her again.

== Cast ==
- Li Bingbing as Tang Weiwei
- Sun Honglei as Yang Nianhua
- Duan Yihong as Wang Yang
- Xue Jianing as Xiao Xiaoling
- Zhang Wei as Lisa
- Xia Lixin as Jona
