= Dayyan Eng =

Chinese-American film director

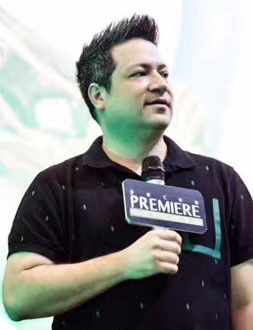
- Eng in 2017
- Born: Taiwan
- Other name: Wu Shixian
- Education: University of Washington
- Alma mater: Beijing Film Academy
- Occupations: Film director, screenwriter, producer, editor
- Years active: 2001–present
- Spouse: Gong Beibi (m. 2004)
- Children: 1

Dayyan Eng, known as Wu Shixian in China (Chinese: 伍仕贤; pinyin: Wǔ Shìxían), born in Taiwan in 1975, is a Chinese-American filmmaker of Chinese, English, and Persian ancestry, who grew up in three continents. He studied film arts at the University of Washington and transferred to the Beijing Film Academy, where he finished his undergraduate studies in directing. Eng started his career directing numerous TV commercials and music videos for the Asian market before he segued into films. Eng first won awards and recognition at the Venice Film Festival, Sundance and Cannes film festivals for his film Bus 44, and later for his acclaimed romantic-comedy Waiting Alone. Eng is the first American to direct a Chinese feature film; the first foreign director invited into the China Film Director's Guild; and made history as the first and only foreign director to date to have a film nominated for Best Picture at the Chinese academy awards. In addition, Eng's films have also garnered accolades and awards for the actors he's worked with, which have included top stars in Asia and Hollywood.

== Career ==
In 2001, Eng wrote and directed Bus 44 (Chinese: 车四十四; pinyin: Chē Sì Shí Sì) starring Chinese film star Gong Beibi. The film premiered and won awards at the 2001 Venice Film Festival and 2002 Sundance Film Festival, and was invited to 2002 Cannes Film Festival "Directors' Fortnight" - becoming the first Chinese short film to be invited in all three festivals' history. The film was covered extensively in the Chinese media and was critically acclaimed in both China and Europe and gained TV and theatrical distribution in territories worldwide.

In 2005, Eng wrote, produced, and directed a Chinese independent feature film Waiting Alone (Chinese: 独自等待; pinyin: Dú Zì Děng Dài), starring an ensemble cast of Chinese stars including Xia Yu, Li Bingbing, Gong Beibi and featuring cameos from some of Asia's most well-known actors including Chow Yun-fat. The film has been called one of 2005 "best films" by over 50 media. Waiting Alone became a hit after its September 2005 domestic China wide-release, and went on to receive 3 nominations, including Best Picture, at the Chinese academy awards (Golden Rooster Awards) -- the first ever in the history of the awards by a foreign director. The film to date still remains the highest-rated romantic comedy from China on Douban and other review sites, resonating deeply with an entire generation of Chinese audiences.

Eng was invited, in 2007, to direct the first-ever opening short for the Chinese academy awards. He got some of Asia's biggest stars, Ziyi Zhang, Liu Ye, Huang Bo and Ge You, to spoof the action-movie genre in a humorous send-up on national TV in China.

In 2011, Eng wrote, directed, and produced Inseparable starring Oscar-winner Kevin Spacey, Daniel Wu, Gong Beibi, Yan Ni, and Peter Stormare. The genre-bending psychological suspense/dramedy debuted at the Busan International Film Festival in 2011 to positive reviews and was released in China in May 2012. Inseparable was named as one of The Wall Street Journal's Top 10 Most Notable Asian Films of the Year, and was also notable for being the first fully Chinese-financed film to have a Hollywood star as a lead.

In 2015, Eng was invited to be on the five-member jury of the prestigious China Film Director's Guild Awards.

In 2017, Eng directed the indie fantasy-comedy Wished (Chinese: 反转人生; Pinyin: Fan Zhuan Ren Sheng) (co-written by Justin Malen), which beat local box office estimates at the time to gross RMB$70 million in two weeks. It held the highest audience scores across the top four ticketing platforms for local comedies released that crowded summer, and gained a total of 100,000,000 paid views across China's top three online movie platforms in just over a fortnight. Wished starred Xia Yu, Yan Ni, K-pop star Victoria Song along with cameos from China's biggest names including Daniel Wu, Wang Baoqiang, Bao Bei'er. The film went on to win a Golden Angel Award at the 2017 Chinese American Film Festival, and Best Fantasy Film and Best Director awards (in addition to wins in several other major categories, including Best Actor/Actress, Best Editing, Best VFX) at the 2018 Los Angeles Film Awards and New York Film Awards. It was an official selection at the 37th Hawaii International Film Festival. The film was optioned in 2019 to be remade into a Hollywood film, with Eng attached to executive produce.

Eng divides his time between Los Angeles and Beijing. He is multilingual, and reads and writes English, Chinese, and Persian.

== Selected filmography ==
As writer, director, producer, editor:

- Wished (Chinese: 反转人生; Pinyin: Fan Zhuan Ren Sheng) (2017)
- Inseparable (Chinese: 形影不离; Pinyin: Xing Ying Bu Li) (2011)
- Waiting Alone (Chinese: 独自等待; Pinyin: Dú Zì Děng Dài) (2005)
- Bus 44 (Chinese: 车四十四; Pinyin: Che Si Shi Si) (2001)

== Partial awards list ==
- 2018: New York Film Awards - Best Picture (Wished)
- 2018: Los Angeles Film Awards - Best Fantasy Film (Wished)
- 2018: Los Angeles Film Awards - Best Director Award (Wished)
- 2018: NYC Indie Film Awards - Best Director Award (Wished)
- 2017: London Independent Film Awards - Best Editing Award (Wished)
- 2017: Chinese American Film Festival - Golden Angel Film Award (Wished)
- 2013: Chinese American Film Festival - Best US-China Co-Production Film Award (Inseparable)
- 2005: Golden Rooster Award - Best Picture Nomination (Waiting Alone)
- 2005: Beijing College Student Film Festival - Best First Feature Award (Waiting Alone)
- 2001: Venice Film Festival - Special Jury Award (Bus 44)
- 2002: Sundance Film Festival - Jury Honorable Mention (Bus 44)
- 2002: Cannes Film Festival - Directors' Fortnight (Bus 44)
- 2002: Florida Film Festival - Grand Jury Award (Bus 44)
