= Never Stop (film) =

2021 Chinese sports film by Han Bowen

- Chinese: 超越
- Hanyu Pinyin: Chāoyuè
- Directed by: Han Bowen
- Produced by: Wang Zhonglei, Ding Jing
- Release date: 12 June 2021
- Running time: 98 minutes
- Country: China
- Language: Mandarin
- Box office: 140 million RMB

Never Stop is a 2021 sports film directed by Han Bowen. The film stars Zheng Kai as a retired sprinter, a role for which real-life sprinter Su Bingtian trained him. The film was released in China on 12 June 2021 and was successful at the box office.

== Plot ==
The film follows retired sprinter Hao Chaoyue and his protégé Wu Tianyi as Tianyi seeks to beat Chaoyue in a 100-meter dash. Though a champion sprinter at first, Chaoyue suffers a series of challenges; he ultimately retires to start a business selling shoes but loses his money in a scam. His protégé Tianyi could not beat Chaoyue at the 100-meter dash before the latter's retirement, Tianyi wants to try again years later. But when he finds Chaoyue, his mentor is a shadow of his former self. Thematically, the film tackles the question of how athletes can live a good life once their days as champions are behind them.

== Cast ==
- Zheng Kai as Hao Chaoyue
- Li Yunrui as Wu Tianyi
- Cao Bingkun as Zhang Benchi
- Zhang Lanxin as Xie Xiaofang
- Sandrine Pinna as Hao Chaoyue's wife
- Li Chen as Niu Tieju
- Jin Jing

== Production ==
In addition to starring in the film, Zheng Kai was also an executive producer; at the film's premiere he told the audience that he was very nervous, "like handing in a college entrance exam paper". In order to play the character of Hao Chaoyue at two different times of life, Zheng first lost weight and then gained about 20 kilograms. He worked hard to gain weight: according to costar Li Chen, "there was one day it was like he ate ten meals in a row...he just about fainted right there".

Sprinter Su Bingtian trained Zheng Kai to help him play his part realistically. Part of the film was shot at a sports school on Ersha Island where Su formerly trained. Su also appears in the film, as do footballer Fan Zhiyi and gymnast Li Ning.

The film's initial working title was "Surpass at High Speed" (疾速超越; Jísù Chāoyuè), but this title was abandoned because Zheng thought it sounded like a title for an auto racing film. The title "After the Finish" (终点之后; Zhōngdiǎn Zhīhòu) was also considered, but Zheng felt that the title shouldn't tell the whole story, and it would be better to just use one word that expressed the theme of "transcending oneself". The film was ultimately released with the Chinese title "Surpass" (超越; Chāoyuè); Chaoyue is also the name of the main character.

== Release and reception ==
Before the film's release, it attracted interest from aspiring athletes, and Zheng Kai said that he hoped the film would inspire athletes to train hard and think about their lives in a mature way.

The film's premiere was held in Beijing on 7 June 2021, and it was released in theaters on 12 June 2021, Dragon Boat Festival weekend. On the day of its release, it earned about 33 million RMB at the box office. On the next day it was the highest-grossing film at the Chinese box office, and it was also the highest-grossing film over Dragon Boat Festival weekend. As of 1 July 2021, Never Stop had grossed 140 million RMB.

Critic Lim Yian Lu wrote that the film's tone was inconsistent, sometimes comedic and sometimes serious, with the result that it was "neither very entertaining nor very encouraging", but still worth watching.

Critic Derek Elley said that although the film's timeline was confusing and its writing was flawed, it remained "an involving portrait of what happens to athletes when they retire from competition but still have some of the flame that fired them in the first place".

== See also ==
- On Your Mark (film)
