= The Legend of the Condor Heroes (disambiguation) =

The Legend of the Condor Heroes may refer to:

- The Legend of the Condor Heroes, known as She Diao Ying Xiong Zhuan (or Shediao Yingxiong Zhuan) in Chinese, is a novel by Jin Yong.
- Films adapted from the novel:
  - Story of the Vulture Conqueror, a two-part Hong Kong film released in 1958 and 1959
  - The Brave Archer, a 1977 Hong Kong film
  - The Brave Archer 2, a 1978 Hong Kong film
  - The Brave Archer 3, a 1981 Hong Kong film
  - The Eagle Shooting Heroes, a 1993 Hong Kong film
  - Legends of the Condor Heroes: The Gallants, a 2025 Chinese film
- Television series adapted from the novel:
  - The Legend of the Condor Heroes (1976 TV series), a 1976 Hong Kong television series
  - The Legend of the Condor Heroes (1983 TV series), a 1983 Hong Kong television series
  - The Legend of the Condor Heroes (1988 TV series), a 1988 Taiwanese television series
  - The Legend of the Condor Heroes (1994 TV series), a 1994 Hong Kong television series
  - The Legend of the Condor Heroes (2003 TV series), a 2003 Chinese television series
  - The Legend of the Condor Heroes (2008 TV series), a 2008 Chinese television series
  - The Legend of the Condor Heroes (2017 TV series), a 2017 Chinese television series
  - The Mystery of the Condor Hero, a 1993 Hong Kong television series
  - The Condor Heroes Return, a 1994 Hong Kong television series
- The Legend of Condor Hero, a 2001 Japanese animated television series based on The Return of the Condor Heroes
