= The Journey (2014 Malaysian film) =

- Theatrical release poster
- Chinese: 一路有你
- Hanyu Pinyin: Yī lù yǒu nǐ
- Directed by: Chiu Keng Guan
- Screenplay by: Ryon Lee; Chan Yoke Yeng
- Produced by: Choo Chi Han; Heng Yee Jia
- Starring: Ben Andrew Pfeiffer; Lee Sai Peng; Joanne Yew Hong Im
- Cinematography: Eric Yeong
- Edited by: Gwyneth Lee
- Music by: Alex San
- Production company: Woohoo Pictures Production
- Distributed by: Astro Shaw
- Release date: 30 January 2014
- Running time: 97 minutes
- Country: Malaysia
- Languages: Cantonese; Mandarin; English
- Budget: RM3 million
- Box office: RM16.87 million

The Journey (Chinese: 一路有你; pinyin: Yīlù yǒu nǐ; trans. "All the way with you") is a 2014 Malaysian Chinese-language comedy-drama film directed by Chiu Keng Guan and written by Ryon Lee. The film stars Ben Andrew Pfeiffer, Lee Sai Peng and Joanne Yew Hong Im. The story follows a father that finally allows his daughter to wed an English lad with a condition that he shall follow him on a journey around the nation to deliver their wedding invitation. The Journey was also invited to be screened at the 16th Far East Film Festival in Udine, Italy.

The Journey won four awards from six nominations on 27th Malaysian Film Festival (including Best non-Malay language film). As of December 2019, The Journey is currently ranked the tenth-highest grossing Malaysian film of all-time.

The movie is also available in original and dubbed-in-Malay versions on Astro First.

== Plot ==
Uncle Chuan is a conservative father with a rigid set of rules. When his daughter Bee (Joanne Yew) returns home after spending most of her formative years in England with her fiancée Benji, Uncle Chuan refuses to give his blessing. With cultural differences and a language barrier that could potentially damage the union between Benji and his loved one, he feels that something must be done quick. Uncle Chuan reluctantly allows them to marry but on one condition — the wedding ceremony has to be in the traditional way.

Despite their lack of understanding towards one another, Benji and Uncle Chuan embark on a nationwide journey to hand-deliver wedding invitations to the latter's childhood friends. Throughout the journey, the two learn valuable lessons about accepting each other's differences.

== Cast ==
- Ben Andrew Pfeiffer as Benjamin Harris/Benji
- Lee Sai Peng as Goh Chee Chuan
- Joanne Yew Hong Im as Goh Bee Yong

Supporting Cast

- Siow Ho Phiew as Lian Pak Cik
- Lim Yew Beng as Lim Dan
- Khok Eng Loy as Tan Ah Kao
- Lim Yen Seng as Choo Chong Meng
- Tan Boon Hua as Cheong Dong Kin
- Chong Nyuk Ling as Lim Kee Huat
- Yeoh Ah Seng as Chew Hok Heng
- Hui Swee Meng as Khow Soon Choy
- Sherry Aljefri as Fatimah Binti Ahmad
- Charlie Chang as Low Boon Cheng
- Huan Yong as Rambo Chew
- Ng Chooi Hong as Auntie Gao
- Justin Ng Zi Xuam as Choo Chee Hin

== Production ==
Principal photography were held on various locations across Malaysia. These include the Cameron Highlands, Chew Jetty and Pinang Tunggal Railway Bridge in Penang (the latter which has since been dismantled), Aur Island, Kuala Lumpur, Baling in Kedah, Ipoh, and Sabah.

The film also features a real life Chingay procession in Johor Bahru, in which director Chiu had to incorporate into the film due to its small budget.

== Release ==
=== Home media ===
The Journey was released by Multimedia Entertainment in DVD formats on 20 March 2014. Alternatively, the film was also released shortly after finishing its theatre run on Astro's on-demand film service Astro First, Mandarin & Malay Language which included a behind-the-scenes documentary namely Chasing for Dream as an additional bonus feature. The film was also released in Singaporean theatres on the same day.

== Reception ==
=== Box-office ===
The film grossed RM2.2 million at launch, easily setting the record for best opening weekend by a Malaysian Chinese production. It went on to gross RM3.7 million after 6 days of release. By the 11th day, it had grossed a total of RM6.6 million. The film was a critical success and with good word of mouth, it officially became the highest grossing local Malaysian Chinese movie production on 12 February 2014 with a gross of RM7.6 million, surpassing the previous record which was held by Ah Beng: Three Wishes (RM7.56 million). As of 16 February, the film had grossed RM9.8 million, making it the first local Malaysian Chinese movie production set to break the RM10 million barrier. Local cinema operators added additional screens to meet the high demand which resulted in sold out screenings across the Klang Valley, Penang and Johor. On 20 Feb, the film was only RM0.2 million behind Ombak Rindu, grossing a total of RM10.70 million, the first local Chinese production to hit the RM10 million milestone.

Owing to the tremendous success of the film in Malaysia, the production company contemplated an earlier release of the film in Singapore. On the fourth weekend ending 23 February 2014, The Journey officially became the highest grossing local production ever in Malaysia's box office history, having amassed a gross of RM12.92 million, beating the previous record holder, KL Gangster's RM11.74 million. In its final theatrical run, the film raked in a total of RM16.87 million. That achievement would later be surpassed by 2015's Polis EVO with its collective gross of RM17.74 million.

== Accolades ==
Award	Year	Category	Nominee	Result
2014	Malaysian Book of Records	Outstanding Arts and Entertainment Award	The Journey	Won
2014	Malaysia Film Festival	Box-Office Film	The Journey	Won
2014	Malaysia Film Festival	Best Actor	Frankie Lee Sai Peng	Won
2014	Malaysia Film Festival	Best Cinematography	Eric Yeong	Won
2014	Malaysia Film Festival	Best Non-Malay Language Local Film	The Journey	Won

== See also ==
- List of Malaysian films of 2014
- Cinema of Malaysia
