= Li Bingbing =

Chinese actress (born 1973)

- 李冰冰
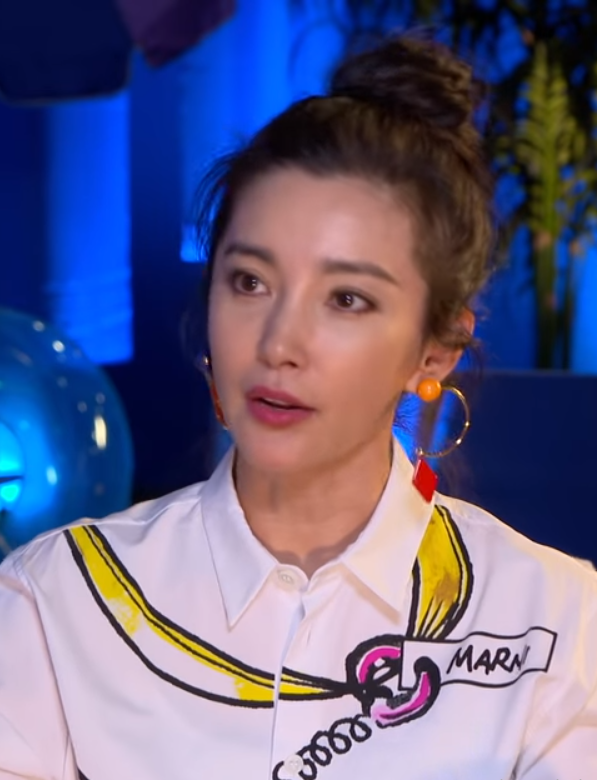
- Li in 2018
- Born: Li Bingbing; 27 February 1973 (age 53); Wuchang, Heilongjiang, China
- Education: Shanghai Theatre Academy
- Occupations: Actress; singer
- Years active: 1994–present
- Agent: Hesong Media
- Awards: Full list
- Musical career
- Label: Huayi Brothers

Chinese name
- Chinese: 李冰冰
Transcriptions
Standard Mandarin
- Hanyu Pinyin: Lǐ Bīngbīng
Yue: Cantonese
- Jyutping: Lei5 Bing1-bing1

Li Bingbing (Chinese: 李冰冰; pinyin: Lǐ Bīngbīng; born 27 February 1973) is a Chinese actress. She gained critical acclaim for her role in Seventeen Years (1999) and received widespread success with films such as A World Without Thieves (2004), Waiting Alone (2005), The Knot (2006), The Forbidden Kingdom (2008), The Message (2009), and Detective Dee and the Mystery of the Phantom Flame (2010). Li has also starred in Hollywood films Resident Evil: Retribution (2012), Transformers: Age of Extinction (2014), and The Meg (2018).

Li ranked 26th on Forbes China Celebrity 100 list in 2013, 28th in 2014, 13th in 2015, 29th in 2017, and 76th in 2019.

== Early life ==
Li Bingbing was born to a workers' family in Wuchang, Heilongjiang, China, her parents were originally from Taigu in Shanxi Province. She has a younger sister Li Xue. At 16, she enrolled in a secondary specialized school, Jixi Normal School (now Heilongjiang University Of Technology). Upon graduation in 1992, she became a probationary music teacher at an elementary school in Harbin for one year. In 1993, she enrolled in the Shanghai Theatre Academy to study acting.

== Career ==
Li gained critical acclaim for her role in Zhang Yuan's Seventeen Years (1999), for which she and Liu Lin shared the Best Actress Award at the 13th Singapore International Film Festival. However, the film went unnoticed in China due to a domestic ban. In 2001, Li gained attention for starring in the popular television series Young Justice Bao. She followed with a number of wuxia television series, such as Taiji Prodigy and Eight Heroes, earning her a label of "action actress."

In 2004, Li achieved breakthrough with her performance in Dayyan Eng's romantic comedy film Waiting Alone, for which she received her first Best Actress nomination at the Chinese academy awards (Golden Rooster Awards). Follow up with starring in Feng Xiaogang's A World Without Thieves, for which she received a nomination of Best Supporting Actress at the Hundred Flowers Awards. In the same year, her sister, Li Xue, became her manager.

In 2009, Li won Best Actress at the 46th Golden Horse Film Awards for her performance in The Message. Li then starred in Tsui Hark's 2010 action-mystery film Detective Dee and the Mystery of the Phantom Flame. She played Shangguan Jing'er, a fictional character based on Shangguan Wan'er, a prestigious politician during the Tang Dynasty. She, along with other partners including Li Xue, established a studio Hesong Entertainment in the same year, co-starring and co-producing the film 1911 with Jackie Chan, which was released in September 2011 to celebrate the 100th anniversary of the Xinhai Revolution.

=== English-language films ===
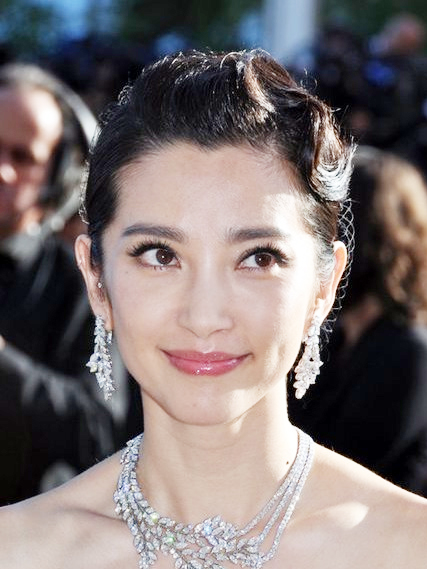
Li at the 2011 Cannes Film Festival

Li’s starred in her first English-language film with Wayne Wang's Snow Flower and the Secret Fan in 2011. It was adapted from Lisa See's 2005 novel of the same title. The film premiered at the 2011 Cannes Film Festival. Li started to gain recognition in Hollywood after starring in Resident Evil: Retribution (2011), playing Ada Wong. The same year, she was cast in action fantasy film 400 Boys, directed by British director Alastair Paton.

In 2013, Li attended the 4th Annual US-China Film Summit and received the East-West Talent Award. Hollywood magazine Variety also named her Asian Star of the Year. The following year, Li featured in Transformers: Age of Extinction, the fourth installment of the film franchise. This helped solidify her success overseas.

In 2015, she was cast in 3D science fiction thriller Nest (also known as Guardians of the Tomb), a Chinese-Australian co-production that was finally released in January 2018. The same year, it was announced that Li would play China's first female superhero in upcoming film Realm, written by Stan Lee, though that project eventually stalled with Lee's passing.

In 2018, Li starred with Jason Statham in the box office hit The Meg, an American-Chinese shark film based on Steve Alten's 1997 novel Meg: A Novel of Deep Terror.

== Other ventures ==
=== Ambassadorships ===
- Charity Ambassador of the Shanghai World Expo
- Goodwill Ambassador of UNEP

=== Philanthropy ===
Li Bingbing has established L.O.V.E, a charitable organization dedicated to the promotion of a positive, environmentally responsible lifestyle. She is also one of the founders of the two-year One Million-Tree Forest project, launched in efforts to change the climate environment and help local residents of Gansu Province, Southwest China, to increase their incomes. Her commitment to green and charitable causes has earned her the recognition as "the most influential global ambassador" from World Wildlife Fund.

== Personal life ==
On 24 July 2013, it was reported that Li has a godfather Wang Lin, a qigong and psi practitioner. Li went to visit Wang for help to cure her mother of her disease.

She is a member of China Zhi Gong Party.

== Filmography ==
=== Film ===
Year	Title	Role	Notes
1994	Spirit of Cops 警魂	Shen Fang	
1994	Qiaoqian Zhixi 乔迁之喜	Juan Juan	
1999	Lüse Rouqing 绿色柔情	Lin Qiaoqiao	
1999	Seventeen Years	Chen Jie	
2003	Love for All Seasons 百年好合	Misery	
2003	Cat and Mouse	Ding Yuehua	
2003	Purple Butterfly	Tang Yiling	
2004	Silver Hawk	Jane	
2004	A World Without Thieves	Xiaoye	
2005	Waiting Alone	Liu Rong	Premiered at 2004 Tokyo Film Festival, released in cinemas in 2005.
2005	Fight for Love 情陷擂台	Ma Lili	
2005	Wait 'Til You're Older	Kwong's mother	Guest appearance
2005	Dragon Squad	Yu Ching	
2006	The Knot	Wang Jindi	
2008	Linger	Fu Enjia	
2008	The Forbidden Kingdom	Ni Chang / White haired witch	
2009	The Message	Li Ningyu	
2010	Triple Tap	Zhao Anna	
2010	Detective Dee and the Mystery of the Phantom Flame	Shangguan Jing'er	
2011	Snow Flower and the Secret Fan	Nina / Lily	
2011	1911	Xu Zonghan	
2012	I Do	Tang Weiwei	
2012	Resident Evil: Retribution	Ada Wong	
2012	400 Boys	—N/a	Not released
2014	Transformers: Age of Extinction	Su Yueming	
2015	Zhong Kui: Snow Girl and the Dark Crystal	Xue'er	
2018	Guardians of the Tomb	Jia	
2018	The Meg	Zhang Suyin	
2022	Ordinary Hero	Zhou Yan	

=== Television ===
Year	English title	Original title	Role	Notes
1994	Yilu Denghou	一路等候	Du Yuling	
1995	No Regrets	无悔追踪	Feng Kangmei	
1996	Zhanguo Chuanqi	战国传奇	Hongnu	
1997	Shang Yang Chuanqi	商鞅传奇	Du Wa	
1997	Fengsheng Shuiqi	风生水起	Gu Ting	
1998	Qinmi Airen	亲密爱人	Bai Tong	
1998	Palace of Desire	大明宫词	Princess Anle	
1998	Da Fating	大法庭	Xia Liyan	
1998	The Female Official	女巡撫之闖天關	Sun Xiaohong	Guest appearance
2000	The Nation Under The Foot	一腳定江山	Fan Yue'e	
2000	Qingchun Chudong	青春出动	Guan Ping	
2000	Yiben Wuhui	義本無悔	Qin Xue	
2000	Smart Kid	機靈小不懂	Ying Ziyan	
2000	Young Justice Bao	少年包青天	Ling Chuchu	
2001	Ye Yatou	野ㄚ頭	Ye Yatou	
2001	Zheshan Tanhua	折扇探花	Sixth Princess	
2001	Taiji Prodigy	少年張三丰	Qin Sirong	
2001	Sky Lovers		Tang Wei	
2002	The Blue Lotus	花样的年华	Ye Zi	
2003	Romancing Hong Kong	动感豪情	Gao Shuang	
2004	City of Sky	天空之城	Xiao Ruoning / Yu Bohan	
2004	The Sea's Promise	海的誓言	Bai Ying	
2004	Changjian Xiangsi	長劍相思	Fengyi	
2004	Strange Tales of Liao Zhai	聊齋之小翠	Yu Xiaocui	
2005	Eight Heroes		Feng Laiyi	
2005	Huiniang Wanxin	徽娘宛心	Ye Wanxin	
2006	Zaisheng Yuan	再生緣之孟麗君傳	Meng Lijun	

== Awards and nominations ==
Year	Award	Category	Nominated work	Result
2000	Singapore International Film Festival	Best Actress	Seventeen Years	Won
2005	12th Beijing Student Film Festival	Most Popular Actress	Waiting Alone	Won
2005	25th Golden Rooster Awards	Best Actress	Waiting Alone	Nominated
2006	28th Hundred Flowers Awards	Best Supporting Actress	A World Without Thieves	Nominated
2007	14th Beijing Student Film Festival	Best Actress	The Knot	Nominated
2007	11th Golden Phoenix Awards	Special Jury Award	The Knot	Won
2007	12th Huabiao Film Awards	Best Actress	The Knot	Won
2007	26th Golden Rooster Awards	Best Actress	The Knot	Nominated
2007	44th Golden Horse Awards	Best Actress	The Knot	Nominated
2008	9th Changchun Film Festival	Best Actress	The Knot	Nominated
2008	29th Hundred Flowers Awards	Best Actress	The Knot	Won
2009	46th Golden Horse Awards	Best Actress	The Message	Won
2010	4th Asian Film Awards	Best Actress	The Message	Nominated
2010	3rd Iron Film Awards	Best Actress	The Message	Nominated
2010	10th Chinese Film Media Awards	Best Actress	The Message	Nominated
2010	10th Chinese Film Media Awards	Best Rising Actress	The Message	Won
2010	17th Beijing Student Film Festival	Best Actress	The Message	Nominated
2012	31st Hundred Flowers Awards	Best Actress	1911	Nominated
2013	9th Huading Awards	Best Actress	I Do	Nominated
2015	3rd China International Film Festival London	Best Actress	Zhong Kui: Snow Girl and the Dark Crystal	Won
2015	3rd China International Film Festival London	The Most Influential Star Overseas	—N/a	Won
2018	14th Chinese American Film Festival	Best Actress in a Leading Role	The Meg	Won
2018	14th Chinese American Film Festival	Chinese American Film Art Exchange and Contribution Award	—N/a	Won
