= David U. Lee =

American film producer

David U. Lee is a Taiwanese-American Hollywood film producer and entrepreneur best known for co-producing the films The Forbidden Kingdom, Shanghai, and Inseparable. He is the president of the film entertainment company Leeding Media, which he founded in 2008.

== Early life and career ==
David U. Lee was born in Taipei in 1975. He earned both his B.A. and M.B.A. degrees from the Marshall School of Business at the University of Southern California. He started his film entertainment career as an intern in the Los Angeles office of Miramax Films in 1997. In 1999, he joined Sony Pictures Entertainment in the Strategic Planning and Corporate Development department. In 2000, Lee was recruited by Revolution Studios as one of the company's initial 20 employees. In 2002, he studied for an MBA degree while working at K1 Ventures, a private equity fund based in Singapore and Boca Raton, Florida. Upon completing his MBA in 2004, Lee joined IDG Asia, a subsidiary of IDG. There Lee oversaw IDG's foray into the Chinese film entertainment business, and launched the Chinese version of Variety.

In 2007, Lee was recruited by Harvey Weinstein to become the Executive Vice President of Asian Operations at The Weinstein Company, where he oversaw the company's Asian business as well as its US$285 million Asian Film Fund.

== Film producer ==
In 2007, Lee co-founded SDJS/Havenwood Media and produced Already Dead, an action-thriller starring Til Schweiger, Ron Eldard and Christopher Plummer, which was distributed by Sony Pictures Entertainment. Lee was a co-executive producer of the Jackie Chan and Jet Li film, The Forbidden Kingdom, which went on to become the most successful China/U.S. co-productions in history.

In April 2008, Lee founded Leeding Media as a film entertainment enterprise dedicated to bridging the U.S. and Chinese film industries. He produced Inseparable starring Kevin Spacey. The company also orchestrated the nationwide release of The Spy Next Door, starring Jackie Chan, the only non-studio foreign film released in China at the same day and date as in the U.S. Grossing over US$8 million, it became the highest grossing non-studio foreign film in Chinese history until the release of Sylvester Stallone's Expendables.

In 2009, Lee advised China Film Group on the co-production of The Karate Kid remake, starring Jackie Chan and Jaden Smith, with Sony Pictures Entertainment. He also served as co-executive producer of The Weinstein Company's first Asian Film Fund production Shanghai, starring John Cusack, Gong Li, Chow Yun-fat and Ken Watanabe.

In September 2011, Perfect World Pictures signed Leeding Media into a multi-year producing deal, making the company the first U.S.-based production company to secure a multi-year term deal with a Chinese studio. Films released under the collaboration include Ghost Rider: Spirit of Vengeance, starring Nicolas Cage (grossed US$9 million); The Last Stand, starring Arnold Schwarzenegger (grossed US$8 million); and Ender’s Game, starring Harrison Ford (grossed US$23 million).

== Awards and recognitions ==
In March 2009, David was named an inaugural member of The Hollywood Reporter's Next Generation Asia, which celebrates the 20 most impressive young men and women in entertainment in Asia.

== Filmography ==
=== Producer ===
- Inseparable (2011)
- Shanghai (2010)
- The Forbidden Kingdom (2008)
- Already Dead (2007)

=== Distributor (China) ===
- Potsdamer Platz (????)
- Insurgent (2015)
- John Wick (2014)
- Divergent (2014)
- Ender's Game (2013)
- Parker (2013)
- Last Stand (2013)
- Rush (2013)
- Riddick (2013)
- Hours (2013)
- The Longest Week (2012)
- LOL (2012)
- Ghost Rider: Spirit of Vengeance (2012)
- Blitz (2012)
- 50/50 (2011)
- Machine Gun Preacher (2011)
- Alpha and Omega (2011)
- Brothers (2011)
- 20 Funerals (2011)
- More Than a game (2010)
- The Spy Next Door (2010)
