= The Legend of Qin =

The Legend of Qin (Chinese: 秦时明月; pinyin: qín shí míng yuè), a.k.a. Qin's Moon, may refer to:

- The Legend of Qin (novel series), a novel series by Taiwanese writer and entrepreneur Sayling Wen (Wen Shiren)
- The Legend of Qin (TV series), the CG Chinese animated TV series directed by Robin Shen (Shen Leping), produced by Sparkly Key Animation Studio
- The Legend of Qin (film), a 2014 CG Chinese animated film directed by Robin Shen (Shen Leping), produced by Sparkly Key Animation Studio
- The Legend of Qin (live action TV series), the live action TV series produced by Tangren Media
