= Guardians of the Tomb =

7 Guardians of the Tomb
- Theatrical release poster
- Traditional Chinese: 謎巢
- Simplified Chinese: 谜巢
- Hanyu Pinyin: Mí cháo
- Directed by: Kimble Rendall
- Screenplay by: Kimble Rendall; Paul Staheli
- Produced by: Li Bingbing; Deng Shuo
- Starring: Li Bingbing; Kellan Lutz; Kelsey Grammer; Wu Chun
- Music by: Roc Chen
- Production companies: Nest Holdings; Loongs United Investment
- Release date: January 19, 2018 (China)
- Running time: 97 minutes
- Countries: Australia; China
- Language: English
- Box office: $7.9 million

Guardians of the Tomb is a 2018 Australian-Chinese science fiction horror thriller film directed and written by Kimble Rendall, starring Li Bingbing, Kellan Lutz, Kelsey Grammer and Wu Chun. It is the largest co-production to date between China and Australia. The film was released on January 19, 2018.

== Synopsis ==
In ancient China, the emperor tasks his court doctor to discover the key to immortality, which leads the doctor briefly to Australia and an encounter with the Aboriginal people there, before he returns to China.

In modern day, Luke and Ethan are researching the myth of the emperor and eternal life in remote China for business man Mason. They discover a cave and start their research but are then seemingly attacked by a group spiders. An incapacitated Luke manages to signal a distress call to Mason before apparently succumbing to his wounds.

Soon after, Mason convinces Luke's estranged sister, Jia (a venom and dangerous animals expert), to accompany him on a search for her brother. The duo arrive in China and greet the other members of the search; Jack, Milly, Chen, and Gary. The group set out quickly in hopes of beating an encroaching lighting storm. As they leave, Jia notices Mason has brought 6 vials of anti-venom with him.

As the group approaches the distress signals location they come across a herd of dead cattle. Upon inspecting them the group notice they are covered in small bite marks and are hollowed out. Suddenly, the storm catches up to them and forcing them to flee to nearby buildings. Entering the building they find it empty. Jack, Chen, Mason and Jia go explore the building with Jack, Mason and Chen discovering corpses and Jia finding a young girl hiding. As Mason and Chen inspect a dead body, swarms of small spiders begin bursting out its skin causing them to flee but not before Chen is bitten. After regrouping, Jia inspects the bite marks on Chen and identifies them as belonging to a funnel web spider but states it's impossible since the spider is only found in Australia. Remembering Mason's anti-venom, Jia retrieves it and administers a dose to Chen but it doesn't appear to work so she gives him a second which does but she notes it appears the venom is stronger.

The lightning storm outside sets the building on fire forcing the group to flee to the basement which has been lined with trigger webbing by the spiders. Mason accidentally trips one causing scores of arachnids to emerge and descend upon them, and both Milly and Mason are bitten. As the spiders circle them the floor gives out, dropping the group into a cave below. Jia rushes to treat Milly but discovers two of the antivenom vials have broken and two are missing, having been hidden by Mason. The spiders again approach the group forcing them to flee further underground. After traversing the caves for some time they come across a chasm of underground lava in their way with doors on the other side. After tripping a mechanism a bridge appears. The group flee across but the bridge falls before Milly is able to cross. As Milly is swarmed by the spiders, she throws herself into the chasm. It is at this point a much larger and more intelligent spider begins stalking the group.

Going forward the rescue team enters ancient Chinese ruins, which Chen identifies as being the emperor's underground palace built for when the emperor dies. A few rooms in, the party finds a chamber full of specimen jars and tapestries. Through the images and writing on the tapestries, Chen tells more of the myth. When the emperor's doctor reached Australia, he found out from one of the shamans that an elixir could be brewed to extend life but its ingredients came from a certain spider (the funnel web) and only at a certain time. The shaman was only able to make a small sample of it, so the doctor caught hundreds of funnel webs and brought them back to China where for decades he experimented on them to mass-produce the elixir for the emperor and himself (a later flashback reveals the spiders got loose killing all in the palace). Mason, who has been looking at the tapestries, sees an image of the elixir and finds it in the room. He takes the only bottle and turns on the group, revealing that the elixir was his sole purpose and he knew about the spiders all along. He flees, locking the others in the room as the spiders arrive.

Narrowly escaping, the remaining members are met by a locked door which can be solved with a puzzle. Whilst the others try to solve it, Jia explores and finds her brother Luke cocooned. Although weak he is still alive. As the spiders find them, they solve the puzzle and move onward (in the process finding Ethan's dead body). Eventually they enter a room rigged with crossbow traps and encounter Mason, who has been bitten numerous times by the spiders. He chastises the group and appears unhinged (a possible side effect of the venom). He attacks the group with a crossbow, injuring Jack but Luke springs the traps causing Mason to be shot with arrows. Luke almost dies during this but Jia uses the elixir to heal him.

The last room in front of the exit turns out to be the spider's nest, filled with thousands of funnel webs, egg sacks and a massive female. When the other large spider arrives (a male), Jia theorises they have been herded to the room from the start. The group start cautiously crossing the room whilst the female watches them, before she suddenly begins launching webs, two of which catch Chen and Gary who are then pulled to the ground where they are swarmed and consumed by the spiders. The remaining few hastily try to figure out how to escape, realising it is another puzzle they quickly solve it which cause the ruins around them to start collapsing and burning. A falling pillar smashes a wall, opening a passage to the outside and Jack, Luke, Jia and the young girl escape. As the nest room collapses around her, the female spider in rage rips apart her male counterpart before herself being crushed by rubble. Soon the flames and rubble spread throughout the tomb destroying most of the spiders. In the final shot, Mason's body begins to be devoured during the destruction, his eyes blinking once indicating he was still alive.

== Cast ==
- Li Bingbing as Jia
- Kellan Lutz as Jack Ridley
- Kelsey Grammer as Mason
- Wu Chun as Luke
- Stef Dawson as Milly Piper
- Shane Jacobson as Gary
- Ryan Johnson as Ethan
- Jason Chong as Chen Xu

== Box office ==
Guardians of the Tomb opened in China on January 19, 2018. Previously titled Nest, it placed fourth at the box office on the Friday of its opening week, with $3.22 million, and eventually reached a three-day total of $6.11 million.
