= Chiu Keng Guan =

Malaysian film director

Chiu Keng Guan 周青元
- Born: 1973 (age 52–53); Batu Pahat, Johor, Malaysia
- Other names: 青元; Chiu; Chiu导 ("Chiudao")
- Education: Beijing Film Academy
- Occupation: Film director
- Years active: 2010–present
- Notable work: WooHoo! (2010); Great Day (2011); The Journey (2014); Ola Bola (2016); On Your Mark (2021)

Chiu Keng Guan (/ˌtʃuː kɛŋ ɡwʌn/; Chinese: 周青元; Jyutping: Zau1 Ceng1 Jyun4; Pe̍h-ōe-jī: Chiu Chheng-goân; pinyin: Zhōu Qīng Yuán) is a Malaysian film director.

== Career ==
Born and raised in Batu Pahat, Johor, Chiu initially studied graphic design and then fine arts, and worked on ceramic and sculpture production before joining HVD Film Production, doing quality assurance.

Chiu then attended the Beijing Film Academy - which in recent times produced Zhang Yimou and Chen Kaige. Since then, he did TV dramas, commercials, corporate videos, and also worked as an assistant director and cameraman. He was also part of the pioneering group that helped set up 8TV, and freelanced for Astro.

Chiu emerged in the local movie scene with Astro and its movie production arm, Astro Shaw, in directing his acclaimed family-oriented Lunar New Year Trilogy of WooHoo! (2010), Great Day (2011) and The Journey (2014), and has been in close working relationship with them since. He is well known to have a preference for amateurs and non-actors, unlike most local commercial filmmakers, who would usually cast professional and famous actors. The cast of Woohoo! and Great Day consists mostly of non-actor celebrities from Astro's popular radio and TV channels, while major roles are given to amateurs in The Journey and Ola Bola. Frankie Lee Sai Peng, the lead actor for The Journey who won the 27th Malaysia Film Festival award for Best Actor, was one such example. Lee was the first recipient of Chinese descent and the eldest since its inauguration at 75 years old.

Chiu's work is known for its emotional charge, and has earned him numerous critical and commercial success, especially within Malaysia. In addition to breaking box office records in Malaysia, he is decorated with notable award wins and nominations, including the Golden Wau Awards and the Malaysia Film Festival awards. His international breakthrough came through On Your Mark (film), a film that was nominated for various international awards and was a box office hit.

== Filmography ==
=== Feature films ===
Year	Film	Box office
2010	大日子 WooHoo!	MYR 4.2 million
2011	天天好天 Great Day	MYR 6.5 million
2014	一路有你 The Journey	MYR 17 million
2016	Ola Bola	MYR 16 million
2018	大大哒 Think Big Big	MYR 5 million
2021	了不起的老爸 On Your Mark	CNY 105 million (~MYR 67 million)
2023	真爱好妈 Ma, I Love You	MYR 3.1 million
2026	Terbang	MYR 2.51 million (as of 23 October 2026)

=== Short film ===
- 2019 "Gift of Time"

=== Television series ===
- 2019 "Never Stand Still"

== Accolades ==
Award	Year	Category	Title	Result
Osaka Asian Film Festival	2011	Grand Prix	WooHoo!	Nominated
San Diego Asian Film Festival	2011	Screening	Great Day	Nominated
Seoul International Youth Film Festival	2011	Audience Favorite Award	Great Day	Won
Golden Wau Awards	2013	Best Movie	WooHoo!	Nominated
Golden Wau Awards	2013	Best Movie	Great Day	Nominated
Golden Wau Awards	2013	Best Director	WooHoo!	Nominated
Golden Wau Awards	2013	Best Director	Great Day	Won
Golden Wau Awards	2015	Best Movie	The Journey	Nominated
Malaysia Film Festival	2015	Box-Office Film Award	The Journey	Won
Malaysia Film Festival	2015	Best Non-Malay Language Film	The Journey	Won
Malaysia Film Festival	2015	Best Cinematography	The Journey	Won
Malaysia Film Festival	2015	Best Original Screenplay	The Journey	Nominated
Malaysia Film Festival	2015	Best Art Direction	The Journey	Nominated
Malaysia Film Festival	2016	Best Film	Ola Bola	Nominated
Malaysia Film Festival	2016	Best Director	Ola Bola	Nominated
Malaysia Film Festival	2016	Best Original Story	Ola Bola	Nominated
Malaysia Film Festival	2016	Special Jury Award - National Unity	Ola Bola	Won
Silk Road International Film Festival	2016	Best Feature	Ola Bola	Nominated
Shanghai International Film Festival (Golden Goblet Awards)	2021	Best Film	On Your Mark	Nominated
Shanghai International Film Festival (Golden Goblet Awards)	2021	Best Actor	On Your Mark	Nominated
Shanghai International Film Festival (Golden Goblet Awards)	2021	Best Screenplay	On Your Mark	Nominated
Hengdian Film Festival of China	2021	Best Actor	On Your Mark	Nominated
