= KSL =

KSL may refer to:

== Companies and organizations ==
- KSL (AM), a radio station in Salt Lake City, Utah
- KSL-FM, a radio station in Midvale, Utah
- KSL-TV, a television station in Salt Lake City, Utah
- Key Sounds Label, a Japanese record label
- Knowledge Systems Laboratory, AI lab at Stanford
- Korea StarCraft League, a tournament

== Locations and transportation ==
- Kate Sharpley Library, a library of anarchist publications
- Kearsley railway station, England, station code
- KSL City, a shopping mall, Johor, Malaysia

== Other ==
- Kenyan Sign Language
- Korean Sign Language
- Kia Super League, English cricket league (2016-2019)
- KSL cells, early form of hematopoietic stem cells
