= Biology =

Scientific study of life

Biology is the scientific study of life and living organisms. It is a broad natural science that encompasses a wide range of fields and unifying principles that explain the structure, function, growth, origin, evolution, and distribution of life. Central to biology are five fundamental themes: the cell as the basic unit of life, genes and heredity as the basis of inheritance, evolution as the driver of biological diversity, energy transformation for sustaining life processes, and homeostasis, the maintenance of internal stability.

Biology examines life across multiple levels of organization, from molecules and cells to organisms, population, and ecosystems. Subdisciplines include molecular biology, physiology, ecology, evolutionary biology, developmental biology, and systematics, among others. Each of these fields applies a range of methods to investigate biological phenomena, including observation, experimentation, and mathematical modeling. Modern biology is grounded in the theory of evolution by natural selection, first articulated by Charles Darwin, and in the molecular understanding of genes encoded in DNA. The discovery of the structure of DNA and advances in molecular genetics have transformed many areas of biology, leading to applications in medicine, agriculture, biotechnology, and environmental science.

Biologists classify organisms—from single-celled archaea and bacteria to multicellular plants, fungi, and animals—based on shared characteristics and evolutionary relationships, using taxonomic and phylogenetics.

== Etymology ==
From Greek βίος (bíos) 'life', (from Proto-Indo-European root *gwei-, to live) and λογία (logia) 'study of'. The compound appears in the title of Volume 3 of Michael Christoph Hanow's Philosophiae naturalis sive physicae dogmaticae: Geologia, biologia, phytologia generalis et dendrologia, published in 1766. The term biology in its modern sense appears to have been introduced independently by Thomas Beddoes (in 1799), Karl Friedrich Burdach (in 1800), Gottfried Reinhold Treviranus (Biologie oder Philosophie der lebenden Natur, 1802) and Jean-Baptiste Lamarck (Hydrogéologie, 1802).

== History ==
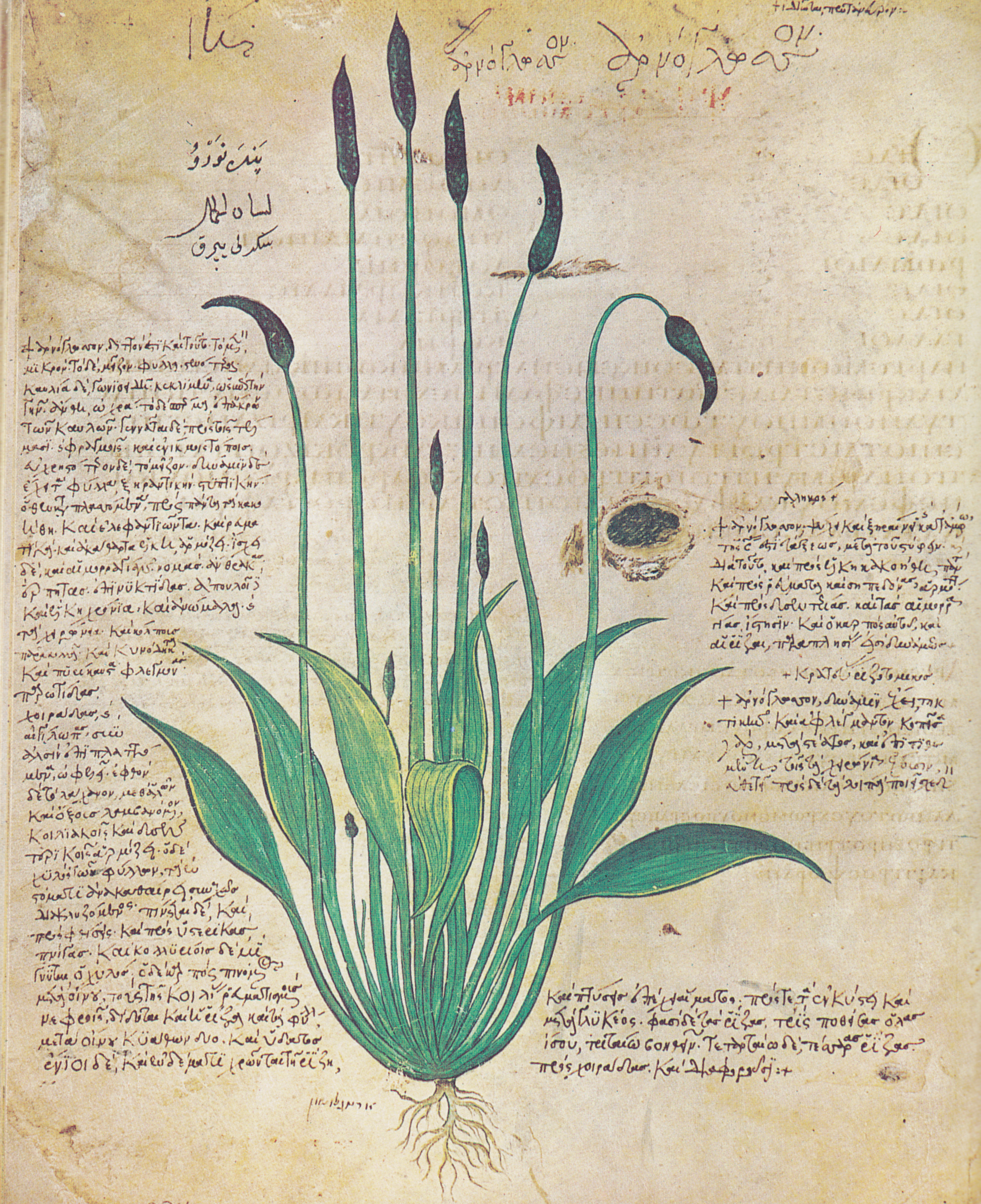
Illustration of Plantago lanceolata (lamb's tongue) in the Vienna Dioscurides, an early 6th-century Byzantine Greek manuscript of De materia medica, a 1st-century work by Dioscorides.

The earliest of roots of science, which included medicine, can be traced to ancient Egypt and Mesopotamia in around 3000 to 1200 BCE. Their contributions shaped ancient Greek natural philosophy. Ancient Greek philosophers such as Aristotle (384–322 BCE) contributed extensively to the development of biological knowledge. He explored biological causation and the diversity of life. His successor, Theophrastus, began the scientific study of plants. Scholars of the medieval Islamic world who wrote on biology included al-Jahiz (781–869), Al-Dīnawarī (828–896), who wrote on botany.

Biology began to develop quickly with Anton van Leeuwenhoek's dramatic improvement of the microscope. It was then that scholars discovered spermatozoa, bacteria, infusoria and the diversity of microscopic life. Investigations by Jan Swammerdam led to new interest in entomology and helped to develop techniques of microscopic dissection and staining. Advances in microscopy had a profound impact on biological thinking. In the early 19th century, biologists pointed to the central importance of the cell. In 1838, Schleiden and Schwann began promoting the now universal ideas that (1) the basic unit of organisms is the cell and (2) that individual cells have all the characteristics of life, although they opposed the idea that (3) all cells come from the division of other cells, continuing to support spontaneous generation. However, Robert Remak and Rudolf Virchow were able to reify the third tenet, and by the 1860s most biologists accepted all three tenets which consolidated into cell theory.

Meanwhile, taxonomy and classification became the focus of natural historians. Carl Linnaeus published a basic taxonomy for the natural world in 1735, and in the 1750s introduced scientific names for all his species. Georges-Louis Leclerc, Comte de Buffon, treated species as artificial categories and living forms as malleable—even suggesting the possibility of common descent.

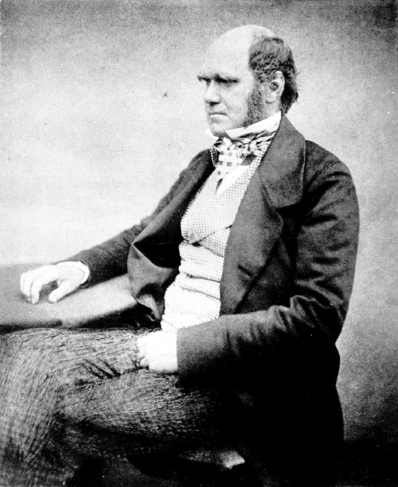
In 1842, Charles Darwin penned his first sketch of On the Origin of Species.

Serious evolutionary thinking originated with the works of Jean-Baptiste Lamarck, who presented a coherent theory of evolution. The British naturalist Charles Darwin, combining the biogeographical approach of Humboldt, the uniformitarian geology of Lyell, Malthus's writings on population growth, and his own morphological expertise and extensive natural observations, forged a more successful evolutionary theory based on natural selection; similar reasoning and evidence led Alfred Russel Wallace to independently reach the same conclusions.

The basis for modern genetics began with the work of Gregor Mendel in 1865. This outlined the principles of biological inheritance. However, the significance of his work was not realized until the early 20th century when evolution became a unified theory as the modern synthesis reconciled Darwinian evolution with classical genetics. In the 1940s and early 1950s, a series of experiments by Alfred Hershey and Martha Chase pointed to DNA as the component of chromosomes that held the trait-carrying units that had become known as genes. A focus on new kinds of model organisms such as viruses and bacteria, along with the discovery of the double-helical structure of DNA by James Watson and Francis Crick in 1953, marked the transition to the era of molecular genetics. From the 1950s onwards, biology has been vastly extended in the molecular domain. The genetic code was cracked by Har Gobind Khorana, Robert W. Holley and Marshall Warren Nirenberg after DNA was understood to contain codons. The Human Genome Project was launched in 1990 to map the human genome.

== Fields ==
=== Biochemistry ===
Biochemistry is the study of chemical processes within and relating to living organisms.

=== Molecular biology ===
Molecular biology is the branch of biology that seeks to understand the molecular basis of biological activity in and between cells. It is centered largely on the study of nucleic acids (such as DNA and RNA) and proteins. It examines the structure, function, and interactions of these macromolecules as they orchestrate processes such as replication, transcription, translation, protein synthesis, and complex biomolecular interactions.

In 1953, the Miller–Urey experiment showed that organic compounds could be synthesized abiotically within a closed system mimicking the conditions of early Earth, thus suggesting that complex organic molecules could have arisen spontaneously in early Earth in the process of abiogenesis.

=== Cell biology ===
Cell biology is the branch of biology that studies the structure, function, and behaviour of cells.

Bioenergetics is a field in biochemistry and cell biology that concerns energy flow through living systems. This is an active area of biological research that includes the study of the transformation of energy in living organisms and the study of thousands of different cellular processes such as cellular respiration and other metabolic and enzymatic processes that enable the use of energy.

=== Genetics ===
Punnett square depicting a cross between two pea plants heterozygous for purple (B) and white (b) blossoms

Genetics is the scientific study of inheritance. Classical genetics, specifically, is the study of how genes and traits are passed on from parents to offspring; its principles are called Mendelian inheritance. A Punnett square can be used to predict the results of a test cross. The chromosome theory of inheritance, which states that genes are found on chromosomes, was supported by Thomas Morgans's experiments with fruit flies, which established the sex linkage between eye color and sex in these insects.

=== Evolutionary developmental biology ===
Evolutionary developmental biology compares the developmental processes of different organisms to infer how developmental processes evolved. The field grew from 19th-century beginnings, where embryology faced a mystery: zoologists did not know how embryonic development was controlled at the molecular level. Charles Darwin noted that having similar embryos implied common ancestry, but little progress was made until the 1970s. Then, recombinant DNA technology at last brought embryology together with molecular genetics. A key early discovery was that of homeotic genes that regulate development in a wide range of eukaryotes. The field explores deep homology, the finding that dissimilar organs such as the eyes of insects, vertebrates and cephalopod molluscs, long thought to have evolved separately, are controlled by similar genes from the evo-devo gene toolkit.

=== Evolutionary biology ===
Evolutionary biology is a subfield of biology that analyzes the mechanisms of evolution. Evolution accounts for the unity and diversity of life on Earth. Theodosius Dobzhansky famously said "nothing in biology makes sense except in the light of evolution". Population genetics for example studies how genetic variation develops, how it is inherited, and how the evolutionary mechanisms shape a population's genetic composition. Research in evolutionary biology covers many topics and incorporates ideas from diverse areas, such as molecular genetics and mathematical and theoretical biology. Some fields of evolutionary research try to explain phenomena that were poorly accounted for in the modern evolutionary synthesis. These include speciation, the evolution of sexual reproduction, the evolution of cooperation, the evolution of ageing, and evolvability.

=== Ecology ===
Ecology is the study of the distribution and abundance of life, the interaction between organisms and their environment.

=== Systematics, phylogenetics, and taxonomy ===
Systematics is the study of the diversification of living forms, both past and present, and the relationships among living things through time. Relationships are visualized as evolutionary trees, studied using phylogenetics, and creating a unified taxonomy of life.

=== Conservation biology ===
Conservation biology is the study of the conservation of Earth's biodiversity with the aim of protecting species, their habitats, and ecosystems from excessive rates of extinction and the erosion of biotic interactions. It is concerned with factors that influence the maintenance, loss, and restoration of biodiversity and the science of sustaining evolutionary processes that engender genetic, population, species, and ecosystem diversity. The concern stems from estimates suggesting that up to 50% of all species on the planet will disappear within the next 50 years, which has contributed to poverty, starvation, and will reset the course of evolution on this planet. Conservation biologists research the trends of biodiversity loss, species extinctions, and the negative effect these are having on our capabilities to sustain the well-being of human society.

== See also ==
- Biology in fiction
- Glossary of biology
- List of biological websites
- List of biologists
- List of biology journals
- List of biology topics
- List of life sciences
- Outline of biology
- Periodic table of life sciences in Tinbergen's four questions
- Terminology of biology
