= Stem-cell therapy =

Use of stem cells to treat or prevent a disease or condition

Stem-cell therapy uses stem cells to treat or prevent a disease or condition. As of 2024, the only FDA-approved therapy using stem cells is hematopoietic stem cell transplantation. This usually takes the form of a bone marrow or peripheral blood stem cell transplantation, but the cells can also be derived from umbilical cord blood. Research is underway to develop various sources for stem cells as well as to apply stem-cell treatments for neurodegenerative diseases and conditions such as diabetes and heart disease.

Stem-cell therapy has become controversial following developments such as the ability of scientists to isolate and culture embryonic stem cells, to create stem cells using somatic cell nuclear transfer, and their use of techniques to create induced pluripotent stem cells. This controversy is often related to abortion politics and human cloning. Additionally, efforts to market treatments based on transplant of stored umbilical cord blood have been controversial.

== Medical uses ==
For over 90 years, hematopoietic stem cell transplantation (HSCT) has been used to treat people with conditions such as leukemia and lymphoma; this is the only widely practiced form of stem-cell therapy. During chemotherapy, most growing cells are killed by the cytotoxic agents. These agents, however, cannot discriminate between the leukaemia or neoplastic cells, and the hematopoietic stem cells within the bone marrow. This is the side effect of conventional chemotherapy strategies that the stem-cell transplant attempts to reverse; a donor's healthy bone marrow reintroduces functional stem cells to replace the cells lost in the host's body during treatment. The transplanted cells also generate an immune response that helps to kill off the cancer cells; this process can go too far, however, leading to graft vs host disease, the most serious side effect of this treatment.

Another stem-cell therapy called Prococvhymal, was conditionally approved in Canada in 2012 for the management of acute graft-vs-host disease in children who are unresponsive to steroids. It is an allogenic stem therapy based on mesenchymal stem cells (MSCs) derived from the bone marrow of adult donors. MSCs are purified from the marrow, cultured and packaged, with up to 10,000 doses derived from a single donor. The doses are stored frozen until needed.

The FDA has approved five hematopoietic stem-cell products derived from umbilical cord blood, for the treatment of blood and immunological diseases.

In 2014, the European Medicines Agency recommended approval of limbal stem cells for people with severe limbal stem cell deficiency due to burns in the eye.

== Research only ==
Diseases and conditions where stem cell treatment is promising or emerging

Stem cells are being studied for several reasons. The molecules and exosomes released from stem cells are also being studied in an effort to make medications. In addition to the functions of the cells themselves, paracrine soluble factors produced by stem cells, known as the stem cell secretome, have been found to be another mechanism by which stem cell-based therapies mediate their effects in degenerative, autoimmune, and inflammatory diseases.

=== Sources for human stem cells ===
Most stem cells intended for regenerative therapy are generally isolated either from the patient's bone marrow or from adipose tissue. Mesenchymal stem cells can differentiate into the cells that make up bone, cartilage, tendons, and ligaments, as well as muscle, neural and other progenitor tissues. They have been the main type of stem cells studied in the treatment of diseases affecting these tissues. The number of stem cells transplanted into damaged tissue may alter the efficacy of treatment. Accordingly, stem cells derived from bone marrow aspirates, for instance, are cultured in specialized laboratories for expansion to millions of cells. Although adipose-derived tissue also requires processing prior to use, the culturing methodology for adipose-derived stem cells is not as extensive as that for bone marrow-derived cells. While it is thought that bone-marrow-derived stem cells are preferred for bone, cartilage, ligament, and tendon repair, others believe that the less challenging collection techniques and the multi-cellular microenvironment already present in adipose-derived stem cell fractions make the latter the preferred source for autologous transplantation.

New sources of mesenchymal stem cells are being researched, including stem cells present in the skin and dermis which are of interest because of the ease at which they can be harvested with minimal risk to the animal. Hematopoietic stem cells have also been discovered to be travelling in the blood stream and possess equal differentiating ability as other mesenchymal stem cells, again with a very non-invasive harvesting technique.

There has been more recent interest in the use of extra embryonic mesenchymal stem cells. Research is underway to examine the differentiating capabilities of stem cells found in the umbilical cord, yolk sac and placenta of different animals. These stem cells are thought to have more differentiating ability than their adult counterparts, including the ability to more readily form tissues of endodermal and ectodermal origin.

==== Embryonic stem cell lines ====
As of 2010, there was widespread controversy over the use of human embryonic stem cells. This controversy primarily targets the techniques used to derive new embryonic stem cell lines, which often requires the destruction of the blastocyst. Opposition to the use of human embryonic stem cells in research is often based on philosophical, moral, or religious objections. There is other stem cell research that does not involve the destruction of a human embryo, and such research involves adult stem cells, amniotic stem cells, and induced pluripotent stem cells.

In January 2009, the US Food and Drug Administration gave clearance to Geron Corporation for the first clinical trial of an embryonic stem-cell-based therapy on humans. The trial aimed to evaluate the drug GRNOPC1, embryonic stem cell-derived oligodendrocyte progenitor cells, on people with acute spinal cord injury. The trial was discontinued in November 2011 so that the company could focus on therapies in the "current environment of capital scarcity and uncertain economic conditions". In 2013 biotechnology and regenerative medicine company BioTime (AMEX: BTX) acquired Geron's stem cell assets in a stock transaction, with the aim of restarting the clinical trial.

==== Mesenchymal stromal cells (MSCs) ====
Scientists reported 2012 that MSCs when transfused immediately within few hours post thawing may show reduced function or show decreased efficacy in treating diseases as compared to those MSCs which are in log phase of cell growth (fresh), so cryopreserved MSCs should be brought back into log phase of cell growth in in vitro culture before administration. Re-culturing of MSCs will help in recovering from the shock the cells get during freezing and thawing. Various MSC clinical trials which used cryopreserved product immediately post thaw have failed as compared to those clinical trials which used fresh MSCs.

=== In drug discovery and biomedical research ===
The ability to grow up functional adult tissues indefinitely in culture through Directed differentiation creates new opportunities for drug research. Researchers are able to grow up differentiated cell lines and then test new drugs on each cell type to examine possible interactions in vitro before performing in vivo studies. This is critical in the development of drugs for use in veterinary research because of the possibilities of species-specific interactions. The hope is that having these cell lines available for research use will reduce the need for research animals used because effects on human tissue in vitro will provide insight not normally known before the animal testing phase.

With the advent of induced pluripotent stem cells (iPSC), treatments being explored and created for the used in endangered low production animals possible. Rather than needing to harvest embryos or eggs, which are limited, the researchers can remove mesenchymal stem cells with greater ease and greatly reducing the danger to the animal due to noninvasive techniques. This allows the limited eggs to be put to use for reproductive purposes only.

=== Stem cell expansion ===
To be used for research or treatment applications, large numbers of high-quality stem cells are needed. Thus, it is necessary to develop culture systems which produce pure populations of tissue-specific stem cells in vitro without the loss of stem-cell potential. Two main approaches are taken for this purpose: two-dimensional and three-dimensional cell culture.

Cell culture in two dimensions has been routinely performed in thousands of laboratories worldwide for the past four decades. In two-dimensional platforms, cells are typically exposed to a solid, rigid flat surface on the basal side and to liquid at the apical surface. Inhabiting such a two-dimensional rigid substrate requires a dramatic adaption for the surviving cells because they lack the extracellular matrix that is unique to each cell type which may alter cell metabolism and reduce its functionality.

Three-dimensional cell culture systems may create a biomimicking microenvironment for stem cells, resembling their native three-dimensional extracellular matrix (ECM). Advanced biomaterials have significantly contributed to three-dimensional cell culture systems in recent decades, and more unique and complex biomaterials have been proposed for improving stem-cell proliferation and controlled differentiation. Among them, nanostructured biomaterials are of particular interest because they have the advantage of a high surface-to-volume ratio, and they mimic the physical and biological features of natural ECM at the nanoscale.

=== Assumed regenerative models ===
Stem cells are thought to mediate repair via five primary mechanisms: 1) providing an anti-inflammatory effect, 2) homing to damaged tissues and recruiting other cells, such as endothelial progenitor cells, that are necessary for tissue growth, 3) supporting tissue remodeling over scar formation, 4) inhibiting apoptosis, and 5) differentiating into bone, cartilage, tendon, and ligament tissue.

To further enrich blood supply to the damaged areas, and consequently promote tissue regeneration, platelet-rich plasma could be used in conjunction with stem cell transplantation. The efficacy of some stem cell populations may also be affected by the method of delivery; for instance, to regenerate bone, stem cells are often introduced in a scaffold where they produce the minerals necessary for generation of functional bone.

Stem cells have been shown to have low immunogenicity due to the relatively low number of MHC molecules found on their surface. In addition, they have been found to secrete chemokines that alter the immune response and promote tolerance of the new tissue. This allows for allogeneic treatments to be performed without a high rejection risk.

=== Potential applications ===
==== Ovarian function ====
In 2021, a phase I non-randomized clinical trial, the first in humans, evaluated the safety and potential benefits of injecting autologous adipose-derived stem cells (ADSCs) into the ovaries of women with premature ovarian failure (POF). Nine patients received varying doses of ADSCs (5, 10, or 15 million cells), and were followed for up to 12 months. The results showed that there were no serious side effects reported, menstruation resumed in 4 out of 9 patients, serum FSH levels decreased in 4 patients, indicating some hormonal improvement. Additionally, ovarian volume, AMH, and antral follicle count (AFC) showed variable results with no significant differences between groups. The study concluded that intra-ovarian ADSC therapy appears safe and feasible, with some signs of improved ovarian function, though results were inconsistent. Larger randomized trials are needed for confirmation.

==== Neurodegeneration ====
Research has been conducted on the effects of stem cells on animal models of brain degeneration, such as in Parkinson's disease, Amyotrophic lateral sclerosis, and Alzheimer's disease. Preliminary studies related to multiple sclerosis have been conducted, and a 2020 phase 2 trial found significantly improved outcomes for mesenchymal stem cell treated patients compared to those receiving a sham treatment. In January 2021 the FDA approved the first clinical trial for an investigational stem cell therapy to restore lost brain cells in people with advanced Parkinson's disease.

Healthy adult brains contain neural stem cells, which divide to maintain general stem-cell numbers, or become progenitor cells. In healthy adult laboratory animals, progenitor cells migrate within the brain and function primarily to maintain neuron populations for olfaction (the sense of smell). Pharmacological activation of endogenous neural stem cells has been reported to induce neuroprotection and behavioral recovery in adult rat models of neurological disorders.

==== Brain and spinal cord injury ====
Stroke and traumatic brain injury lead to cell death, characterized by a loss of neurons and oligodendrocytes within the brain. Clinical and animal studies have been conducted into the experimental use of stem cells in cases of spinal cord injury.

==== Frailty syndrome ====
In 2017, a small-scale study on individuals 60 years or older with aging frailty showed, after intravenous treatment with Mesenchymal stem cells (MSC) from healthy young donors, significant improvements in physical performance measures. MSC helps with the blockade of inflammation by decreasing it, causing the effects of frailty to reverse.

==== Heart ====
In 2012, stem cells were studied in people with severe heart disease. The work by Bodo-Eckehard Strauer was discredited by identifying hundreds of factual contradictions. Among several clinical trials reporting that adult stem cell therapy is safe and effective, actual evidence of benefit has been reported from only a few studies. Some preliminary clinical trials achieved only modest improvements in heart function following the use of bone marrow stem cell therapy.

Stem-cell therapy for the treatment of myocardial infarction usually makes use of autologous bone marrow stem cells, but other types of adult stem cells may be used, such as adipose-derived stem cells.

Possible mechanisms of recovery include:Generation of heart muscle cells, Stimulating growth of new blood vessels to repopulate damaged heart tissue and secretion of growth factors.

==== Blood-cell formation ====
The specificity of the human immune-cell repertoire is what allows the human body to defend itself from rapidly adapting antigens. However, the immune system is vulnerable to degradation upon the pathogenesis of disease, and because of the critical role that it plays in overall defense, its degradation is often fatal to the organism as a whole. Diseases of hematopoietic cells are diagnosed and classified via a subspecialty of pathology known as hematopathology. The specificity of the immune cells is what allows recognition of foreign antigens, causing further challenges in the treatment of immune disease. Identical matches between donor and recipient are no longer required for successful transplantation. Rather, haploidentical matches have facilitated numerous transplants, given improvements in post-transplant immunosuppressive regimens. Research using both hematopoietic adult stem cells and embryonic stem cells has provided insight into the possible mechanisms and methods of treatment for many of these ailments.

Fully mature human red blood cells may be generated ex vivo by hematopoietic stem cells (HSCs), which are precursors of red blood cells. In this process, HSCs are grown together with stromal cells, creating an environment that mimics the conditions of bone marrow, the natural site of red-blood-cell growth. Erythropoietin, a growth factor, is added, coaxing the stem cells to complete terminal differentiation into red blood cells. Further research into this technique should have potential benefits for gene therapy, blood transfusion, and topical medicine.

==== Regrowing teeth ====
In 2004, scientists at King's College London discovered a way to cultivate a complete tooth in mice and were able to grow bioengineered teeth stand-alone in the laboratory. Researchers are confident that tooth regeneration technology can be used to grow live teeth in people.

In theory, stem cells taken from the patient could be coaxed in the lab turning into a tooth bud which, when implanted in the gums, will give rise to a new tooth, and would be expected to be grown in a time over three weeks. It will fuse with the jawbone and release chemicals that encourage nerves and blood vessels to connect with it. The process is similar to what happens when humans grow their original adult teeth. Many challenges remain, however, before stem cells can be a choice for the replacement of missing teeth in the future.

==== Cochlear hair cell regrowth ====
Heller has reported success in re-growing cochlea hair cells with the use of embryonic stem cells.

In a 2019 review that looked at hearing regeneration and regenerative medicine, stem cell-derived otic progenitors have the potential to greatly improve hearing.

==== Blindness and vision impairment ====
Since 2003, researchers have successfully transplanted corneal stem cells into damaged eyes to restore vision. "Sheets of retinal cells used by the team are harvested from aborted fetuses, which some people find objectionable." When these sheets are transplanted over the damaged cornea, the stem cells stimulate renewed repair, eventually restoring vision. The latest such development was in June 2005, when researchers at the Queen Victoria Hospital of Sussex, England were able to restore the sight of forty people using the same technique. The group, led by Sheraz Daya, was able to successfully use adult stem cells obtained from the patient, a relative, or even a cadaver. Further rounds of trials are ongoing.

==== Pancreatic beta cells ====
People with Type 1 diabetes lose the function of insulin-producing beta cells within the pancreas. In a 2007 publication of experiments, scientists have been able to coax embryonic stem cells to turn into beta cells in the lab. In theory, if the beta cell is transplanted successfully, they will be able to replace malfunctioning ones in a diabetic patient. There are adverse effects of high glucose concentrations on stem cell therapy, however.

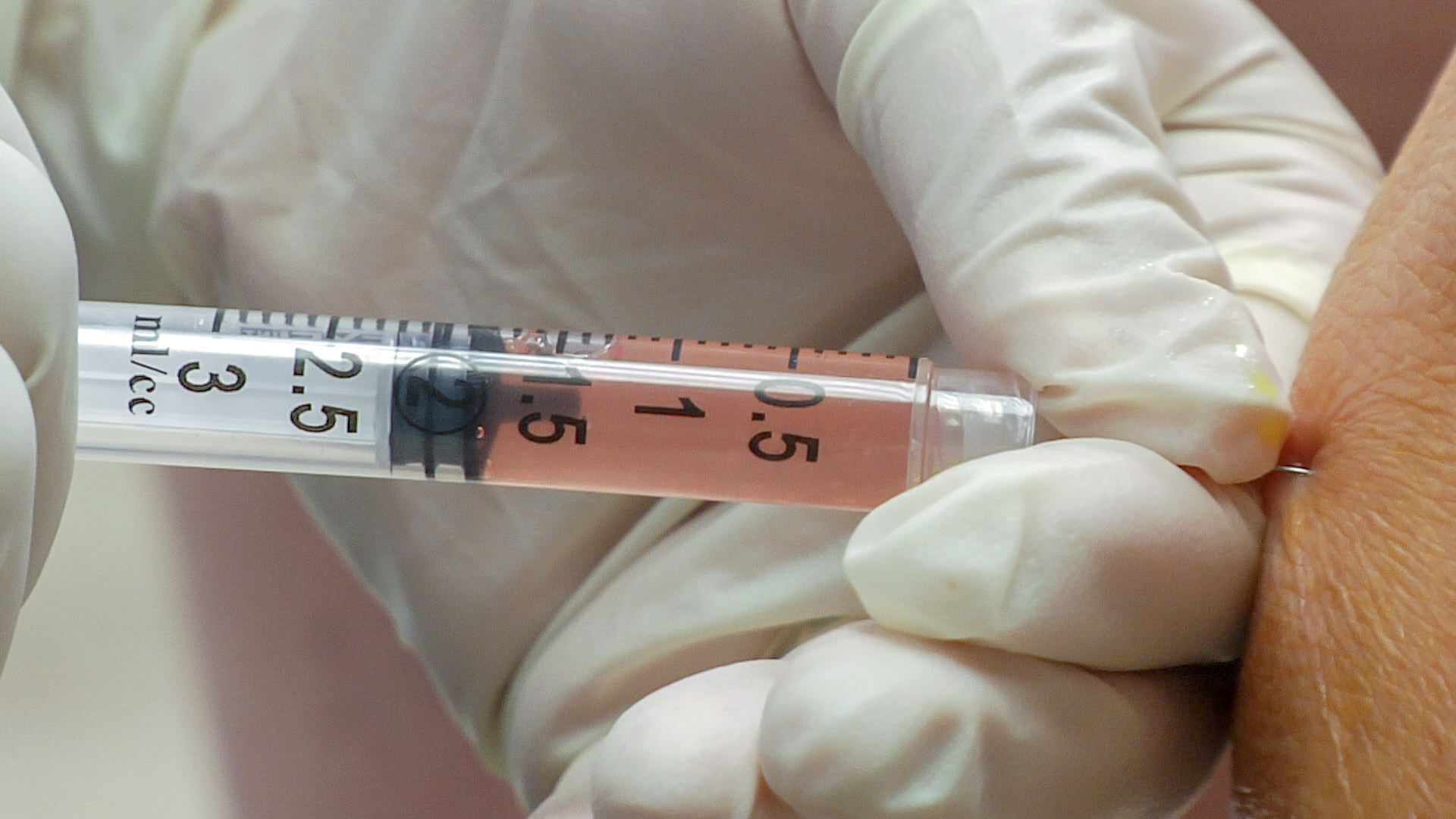
Mesenchymal stem cells being injected into the knee of patient

A key challenge in cell transplantation therapies for Type 1 diabetes is hypoxia and low oxygen conditions in transplant environments that can impair the function and identity of stem cell-derived beta cells.

==== Orthopedics ====
As of 2017, use of mesenchymal stem cells (MSCs) derived from adult stem cells was under preliminary research for potential orthopedic applications in bone and muscle trauma, cartilage repair, osteoarthritis, intervertebral disc surgery, rotator cuff surgery, and musculoskeletal disorders, among others. Other areas of orthopedic research for uses of MSCs include tissue engineering and regenerative medicine.

==== Wound healing ====
Stem cells can also be used to stimulate the growth of human tissues. In an adult, wounded tissue is most often replaced by scar tissue, which is characterized in the skin by disorganized collagen structure, loss of hair follicles and irregular vascular structure. In the case of wounded fetal tissue, however, wounded tissue is replaced with normal tissue through the activity of stem cells. A possible method for tissue regeneration in adults is to place adult stem cell "seeds" inside a tissue bed "soil" in a wound bed and allow the stem cells to stimulate differentiation in the tissue bed cells. This method elicits a regenerative response more similar to fetal wound-healing than adult scar tissue formation. As of 2018, researchers were still investigating different aspects of the "soil" tissue that are conducive to regeneration. Because of the general healing capabilities of stem cells, they have gained interest for the treatment of cutaneous wounds, such as in skin cancer.

Stem cell therapy has also been investigated for hair follicle regeneration. A clinical case report demonstrated improvement in hair loss following COVID-19 vaccination through combined administration of autologous CD34+ hematopoietic progenitor cell fraction and umbilical cord blood-derived mesenchymal stem cells (UC-MSCs), with progressive recovery of hair density observed over 12 weeks of treatment without significant adverse effects.

==== HIV/AIDS ====
In 2013, scientists have been investigating an alternative approach to treating HIV-1/AIDS, based on the creation of a disease-resistant immune system through transplantation of autologous, gene-modified (HIV-1-resistant) hematopoietic stem and progenitor cells (GM-HSPC).

==== Stem Cell-Derived Exosomes ====
Recent research suggests that stem cell-derived exosomes could become an alternative to stem cell-based therapy to minimize the limitations associated with traditional stem cell therapy such as immunogenicity and tumorigenic risk.

== Criticisms ==
In 2013, studies of autologous bone marrow stem cells on ventricular function were found to contain "hundreds" of discrepancies. Critics report that of 48 reports, just five underlying trials seemed to be used, and that in many cases whether they were randomized or merely observational accepter-versus-rejecter, was contradictory between reports of the same trial. One pair of reports of identical baseline characteristics and final results, was presented in two publications as, respectively, a 578-patient randomized trial and as a 391-subject observational study. Other reports required (impossible) negative standard deviations in subsets of people or contained fractional subjects, negative NYHA classes. Overall, many more people were reported as having receiving stem cells in trials, than the number of stem cells processed in the hospital's laboratory during that time. A university investigation, closed in 2012 without reporting, was reopened in July 2013.

In 2014, a meta-analysis on stem cell therapy using bone-marrow stem cells for heart disease revealed discrepancies in published clinical trial reports, whereby studies with a higher number of discrepancies showed an increase in effect sizes. Another meta-analysis based on the intra-subject data of 12 randomized trials was unable to find any significant benefits of stem cell therapy on primary endpoints, such as major adverse events or increase in heart function measures, concluding there was no benefit.

2018 results of the TIME trial, which used a randomized, double-blind, placebo-controlled trial design, concluded that "bone marrow mononuclear cells administration did not improve recovery of LV function over 2 years" in people who had a myocardial infarction. Accordingly, the BOOST-2 trial conducted in 10 medical centers in Germany and Norway reported that the trial result "does not support the use of nucleated BMCs in patients with STEMI and moderately reduced LVEF". Furthermore, the trial also did not meet any other secondary MRI endpoints, leading to a conclusion that intracoronary bone marrow stem cell therapy does not offer a functional or clinical benefit.

In 2021, stem cell injections in the US have caused grave infections in at least 20 patients who received umbilical cord blood-derived products marketed as "stem cell treatment". In 2023, the case of a woman who was infected with Mycobacterium abscessus and sustained meningitis after stem cell treatment for multiple sclerosis at a commercial clinic in Baja California, Mexico was published.

== Veterinary medicine ==
Research conducted on horses, dogs, and cats has led to the development of stem cell treatments in veterinary medicine which can target a wide range of injuries and diseases, such as myocardial infarction, stroke, tendon and ligament damage, osteoarthritis, osteochondrosis and muscular dystrophy, both in large animals as well as in humans. While investigation of cell-based therapeutics generally reflects human medical needs, the high degree of frequency and severity of certain injuries in racehorses has put veterinary medicine at the forefront of this novel regenerative approach. Companion animals can serve as clinically relevant models that closely mimic human disease.

=== Sources of veterinarian stem cells ===
Veterinary applications of stem cell therapy as a means of tissue regeneration have been largely shaped by research that began with the use of adult-derived mesenchymal stem cells to treat animals with injuries or defects affecting bone, cartilage, ligaments and/or tendons. There are two main categories of stem cells used for treatments: allogeneic stem cells derived from a genetically different donor within the same species, and autologous mesenchymal stem cells, derived from the patient before use in various treatments. A third category, xenogenic stem cells, or stem cells derived from different species, are used primarily for research purposes, especially for human treatments.

=== Bone repair ===
Bone has a unique and well-documented natural healing process that normally is sufficient to repair fractures and other common injuries. Misaligned breaks due to severe trauma, as well as treatments like tumor resections of bone cancer, are prone to improper healing if left to the natural process alone. Scaffolds composed of natural and artificial components are seeded with mesenchymal stem cells and placed in the defect. Within four weeks of placing the scaffold, newly formed bone begins to integrate with the old bone and within 32 weeks, full union is achieved. Further studies are necessary to fully characterize the use of cell-based therapeutics for treatment of bone fractures.

Stem cells have been used to treat degenerative bone diseases in dogs. The normally recommended treatment for dogs that have Legg–Calve–Perthes disease is to remove the head of the femur after the degeneration has progressed. Recently, mesenchymal stem cells have been injected directly in to the head of the femur, with success not only in bone regeneration, but also in pain reduction.

=== Ligament and tendon repair ===
Autologous stem cell-based treatments for ligament injury, tendon injury, osteoarthritis, osteochondrosis, and sub-chondral bone cysts have been commercially available to practicing veterinarians to treat horses since 2003 in the United States and since 2006 in the United Kingdom. Autologous stem cell based treatments for tendon injury, ligament injury, and osteoarthritis in dogs have been available to veterinarians in the United States since 2005. Over 3000 privately owned horses and dogs have been treated with autologous adipose-derived stem cells. The efficacy of these treatments has been shown in double-blind clinical trials for dogs with osteoarthritis of the hip and elbow and horses with tendon damage.

Race horses are especially prone to injuries of the tendon and ligaments. Conventional therapies are very unsuccessful in returning the horse to full functioning potential. Natural healing, guided by the conventional treatments, leads to the formation of fibrous scar tissue that reduces flexibility and full joint movement. Traditional treatments prevented a large number of horses from returning to full activity and also have a high incidence of re-injury due to the stiff nature of the scarred tendon. Introduction of both bone marrow and adipose derived stem cells, along with natural mechanical stimulus promoted the regeneration of tendon tissue. The natural movement promoted the alignment of the new fibers and tendocytes with the natural alignment found in uninjured tendons. Stem cell treatment not only allowed more horses to return to full duty and also greatly reduced the re-injury rate over a three-year period.

The use of embryonic stem cells has also been applied to tendon repair. The embryonic stem cells were shown to have a better survival rate in the tendon as well as better migrating capabilities to reach all areas of damaged tendon. The overall repair quality was also higher, with better tendon architecture and collagen formed. There was also no tumor formation seen during the three-month experimental period. Long-term studies need to be carried out to examine the long-term efficacy and risks associated with the use of embryonic stem cells. Similar results have been found in small animals.

==== Joint repair ====
Osteoarthritis is the main cause of joint pain both in animals and humans. Horses and dogs are most frequently affected by arthritis. Natural cartilage regeneration is very limited. Different types of mesenchymal stem cells and other additives are still being researched to find the best type of cell and method for long-term treatment.

Adipose-derived mesenchymal cells are currently the most often used for stem cell treatment of osteoarthritis because of the non-invasive harvesting. This is a recently developed, non-invasive technique developed for easier clinical use. Dogs receiving this treatment showed greater flexibility in their joints and less pain.

=== Muscle repair ===
Stem cells have successfully been used to ameliorate healing in the heart after myocardial infarction in dogs. Adipose and bone marrow derived stem cells were removed and induced to a cardiac cell fate before being injected into the heart. The heart was found to have improved contractility and a reduction in the damaged area four weeks after the stem cells were applied.

In 2007, a trial was underway for a patch made of a porous substance onto which the stem cells are "seeded" in order to induce tissue regeneration in heart defects. Tissue was regenerated and the patch was well incorporated into the heart tissue. This is thought to be due, in part, to improved angiogenesis and reduction of inflammation. Although cardiomyocytes were produced from the mesenchymal stem cells, they did not appear to be contractile. Other treatments that induced a cardiac fate in the cells before transplanting had greater success at creating contractile heart tissue.

2018 research, such as the European nTRACK research project, aims to demonstrate that multimodal nanoparticles can structurally and functionally track stem cell in muscle regeneration therapy. The idea is to label stem cells with gold nano-particles that are fully characterised for uptake, functionality, and safety. The labelled stem cells will be injected into an injured muscle and tracked using imaging systems. However, the system still needs to be demonstrated at lab scale.

=== Nervous system repair ===
Spinal cord injuries are one of the most common traumas brought into veterinary hospitals. Spinal injuries occur in two ways after the trauma: the primary mechanical damage, and in secondary processes, like inflammation and scar formation, in the days following the trauma. These cells involved in the secondary damage response secrete factors that promote scar formation and inhibit cellular regeneration. Mesenchymal stem cells that are induced to a neural cell fate are loaded onto a porous scaffold and are then implanted at the site of injury. The cells and scaffold secrete factors that counteract those secreted by scar forming cells and promote neural regeneration. Eight weeks later, dogs treated with stem cells showed immense improvement over those treated with conventional therapies. Dogs treated with stem cells were able to occasionally support their own weight, which has not been seen in dogs undergoing conventional therapies.

In a study to evaluate the treatment of experimentally induced MS in dogs using laser activated non-expanded adipose derived stem cells. The results showed amelioration of the clinical signs over time confirmed by the resolution of the previous lesions on MRI. Positive migration of the injected cells to the site of lesion, increased remyelination detected by Myelin Basic Proteins, positive differentiation into Olig2 positive oligodendrocytes, prevented the glial scar formation and restored axonal architecture.

Treatments are also in clinical trials to repair and regenerate peripheral nerves. Peripheral nerves are more likely to be damaged, but the effects of the damage are not as widespread as seen in injuries to the spinal cord. Treatments are currently in clinical trials to repair severed nerves, with early success. Stem cells induced to a neural fate injected in to a severed nerve. Within four weeks, regeneration of previously damaged stem cells and completely formed nerve bundles were observed.

Stem cells are also in clinical phases for treatment in ophthalmology. Hematopoietic stem cells have been used to treat corneal ulcers of different origin of several horses. These ulcers were resistant to conventional treatments available, but quickly responded positively to the stem cell treatment. Stem cells were also able to restore sight in one eye of a horse with retinal detachment, allowing the horse to return to daily activities.

=== Conservation ===
Stem cells are being explored for use in conservation efforts. Spermatogonial stem cells have been harvested from a rat and placed into a mouse host and fully mature sperm were produced with the ability to produce viable offspring. Currently research is underway to find suitable hosts for the introduction of donor spermatogonial stem cells. If this becomes a viable option for conservationists, sperm can be produced from high genetic quality individuals who die before reaching sexual maturity, preserving a line that would otherwise be lost.

== Society and culture ==
=== Marketing and costs ===
In the late 1990s and early 2000s, there was an initial wave of companies and clinics offering stem cell therapy, while not substantiating health claims or having regulatory approval. By 2012, a second wave of companies and clinics had emerged, usually located in developing countries where medicine is less regulated and offering stem cell therapies on a medical tourism model. Like the first wave companies and clinics, they made similar strong, but unsubstantiated, claims, mainly by clinics in the United States, Mexico, Thailand, India, and South Africa. By 2016, research indicated that there were more than 550 stem cell clinics in the US alone selling generally unproven therapies for a wide array of medical conditions in almost every state in the country, altering the dynamic of stem cell tourism. In 2018, the FDA sent a warning letter to StemGenex Biologic Laboratories in San Diego, which marketed a service in which it took body fat from people, processed it into mixtures it said contained various forms of stem cells, and administered it back to the person by inhalation, intravenously, or infusion into their spinal cords; the company said the treatment was useful for many chronic and life-threatening conditions.

One common marketing tactic is registering on ClinicalTrials.gov, the US government database for clinical trials. Registration of a study notifies the agency but does not prove that review has taken place. Registration with the FDA similarly does not prove that approval has been granted.

Costs of stem cell therapies range widely by clinic, condition, and cell type, but most commonly range between $10,000-$20,000. Insurance does not cover stem cell injections at clinics so patients often use on-line fundraising. In 2018, the US Federal Trade Commission found health centers and an individual physician making unsubstantiated claims for stem cell therapies, and forced refunds of some $500,000. The FDA filed suit against two stem cell clinic firms around the same time, seeking permanent injunctions against their marketing and use of unapproved adipose stem cell products.

=== COVID-19-related marketing and government agency responses ===
Although according to the NIH no stem cell treatments have been approved for COVID-19, and the agency recommends against the use of MSCs for the disease, some stem cell clinics began marketing both unproven and non-FDA-approved stem cells and exosomes for COVID-19 in 2020. The FDA took prompt action by sending letters to the firms in question. The FTC also warned a stem cell firm for misleading COVID-19-related marketing.

== See also ==
- Autologous stem-cell transplantation
- Cardiovascular Cell Therapy Research Network (CCTRN)
- Fetal tissue implant
- Induced pluripotent stem cell
- Induced stem cells
- Stem cell chip
- Stem cell therapy for macular degeneration
