= Classical genetics =

Branch of genetics

Classical genetics is the branch of genetics based solely on visible results of reproductive acts. It is the oldest discipline in the field of genetics, going back to the experiments on Mendelian inheritance by Gregor Mendel who made it possible to identify the basic mechanisms of heredity. Subsequently, these mechanisms have been studied and explained at the molecular level.

Classical genetics consists of the techniques and methodologies of genetics that were in use before the advent of molecular biology. A key discovery of classical genetics in eukaryotes was genetic linkage. The observation that some genes do not segregate independently at meiosis broke the laws of Mendelian inheritance and provided science with a way to map characteristics to a location on the chromosomes. Linkage maps are still used today, especially in breeding for plant improvement.

After the discovery of the genetic code and such tools of cloning as restriction enzymes, the avenues of investigation open to geneticists were greatly broadened. Some classical genetic ideas have been supplanted with the mechanistic understanding brought by molecular discoveries, but many remain intact and in use. Classical genetics is often contrasted with reverse genetics, and aspects of molecular biology are sometimes referred to as molecular genetics.

== Basic definitions ==
The concept of a gene lies at the root of classical genetics. A gene represents the fundamental unit of heredity that is transmitted from parent organisms to offspring. The genes are composed of sequences of DNA and, one after another, are lined up at fixed positions on chromosomes within the nucleus of cells. They contain the information needed to make proteins, which contribute, in turn, to the manifestation of specific characteristics. The characteristics are associated with a simple feature or character.[National Cancer Institute]

The set of genes for one or more characters possessed by an individual is the genotype. It refers to the genetic makeup or combination of alleles present at a particular location known as the locus in the genome. Genes can be represented by symbols like capital and lower-case letters, which indicate different variants of a gene. Alternatively, genotypes can be expressed by the actual DNA bases of a specific location. Techniques like DNA sequencing allow scientists to determine genotypes at millions of loci across the genome in a single experiment. A diploid individual often has two alleles for the determination of a character. [National Human Genome Research Institute]

== Overview ==
Classical genetics is the aspect of genetics concerned solely with the transmission of genetic traits via reproductive acts. Genetics is, generally, the study of genes, genetic variation, and heredity. The process by which characteristics are passed down from parents to their offspring is called heredity. In the sense of classical genetics, variation is known as the lack of resemblance in related individuals and can be categorized as discontinuous or continuous. Genes are a fundamental part of DNA that is aligned linearly on a eukaryotic chromosome. Chemical information that is transported and encoded by each gene is referred to as a trait. Many organisms possess two genes for each individual trait that is present within that particular individual. These paired genes that control the same trait is classified as an allele. In an individual, the allelic genes that are expressed can be either homozygous, meaning the same, or heterozygous, meaning different. Many pairs of alleles have differing effects that are portrayed in an offspring's phenotype and genotype. The phenotype is a general term that defines an individual's visible, physical traits. The genotype of an offspring is known as its genetic makeup. The alleles of genes can either be dominant or recessive. A dominant allele needs only one copy to be expressed while a recessive allele needs two copies (homozygous) in a diploid organism to be expressed. Dominant and recessive alleles help to determine the offspring's genotypes, and therefore phenotypes.

== History ==
Classical genetics is often referred to as the oldest form of genetics, and began with Gregor Mendel's experiments that formulated and defined a fundamental biological concept known as Mendelian inheritance. Mendelian inheritance is the process in which genes and traits are passed from a set of parents to their offspring. These inherited traits are passed down mechanistically with one gene from one parent and the second gene from another parent in sexually reproducing organisms. This creates the pair of genes in diploid organisms. Gregor Mendel started his experimentation and study of inheritance with phenotypes of garden peas and continued the experiments with plants. He focused on the patterns of the traits that were being passed down from one generation to the next generation. This was assessed by test-crossing two peas of different colors and observing the resulting phenotypes. After determining how the traits were likely inherited, he began to expand the amount of traits observed and tested and eventually expanded his experimentation by increasing the number of different organisms he tested.

About 150 years ago, Gregor Mendel published his first experiments with the test crossing of Pisum peas. Seven different phenotypic characteristics were studied and tested in the peas, including seed color, flower color and seed shape. The seven different characteristics which Mendel selected / checked for the experiment were as follows:

- He checked the different shape of the ripen seeds
- The color of the seed's albumen was checked
- He then selected seed coat color
- Shape of the ripen pods was seen
- Color of the unripened pods was checked
- Flower position on the axial was checked
- Height of the plant was checked, as if it is tall or dwarf.

Mendel took peas that had differing phenotypic characteristics and test-crossed them to assess how the parental plants passed the traits down to their offspring. He started by crossing a round, yellow and round, green pea and observed the resulting phenotypes. The results of this experiment allowed him to see which of these two traits was dominant and which was recessive based upon the number of offspring with each phenotype. Mendel then chose to further his experiments by crossing a pea plant homozygous dominant for round and yellow phenotypes with a pea plant that was homozygous recessive for wrinkled and green. The plants that were originally crossed are known as the parental generation, or P generation, and the offspring resulting from the parental cross is known as the first filial, or F1, generation. The plants of the F1 generation resulting from this hybrid cross were all heterozygous round and yellow seeds.

== See also ==
- Dominance (genetics)
- Genotype
- Phenotype
- Thomas Hunt Morgan
