= Stem cell secretome =

Paracrine soluble factors produced by stem cells

The stem cell secretome (also referred to as the stromal cell secretome) is a collective term for the paracrine soluble factors produced by stem cells and utilized for their inter-cell communication. In addition to inter-cell communication, the paracrine factors are also responsible for tissue development, homeostasis and (re-)generation. The stem cell secretome consists of extracellular vesicles, specifically exosomes, microvesicles, membrane particles, peptides and small proteins (cytokines). The paracrine activity of stem cells, i.e. the stem cell secretome, has been found to be the predominant mechanism by which stem cell-based therapies mediate their effects in degenerative, auto-immune and/or inflammatory diseases. Though not only stem cells possess a secretome which influences their cellular environment, their secretome currently appears to be the most relevant for therapeutic use.

== Extracellular Vesicles ==
The Extracellular Vesicles are small partials that are normally discharged and have boundaries that are formed by a lipid bilayer. Although cells can replicate, extracellular vesicle is not able to. In the extracellular vesical, things that consist of the stem cell secretome and are being packed are organelles, mRNA, miRNA, and proteins. Exosomes are discharged from the extracellular vesicles, which are found in biological fluid. Biological fluid like the cerebrospinal fluid, which can be used for treatment. Most impotently, exosomes can be found in between the eukaryotic organism's cell, also known as the tissue matrix.

== Research ==
Stem Cell therapies, here referred to as therapies employing non-hematopoietic, mesenchymal stem cells, have a wide range of potential therapeutic benefits for different diseases, most of which are currently investigated in clinical trials. Stem cell therapies can benefit as a regenerative medicine for patients that have or been diagnosed with disease that affect the mid part of the brain, strokes and heart disease, joint disease and injuries to the spinal cord. Therapeutic properties of stem cells are mainly attributed to their secretome, which has been shown to modulate several biological processes in vitro and in vivo, such as cell proliferation, survival, differentiation, immunomodulation, anti-apoptosis, angiogenesis and stimulation of tissue adjacent cells. This is contrary to the historic hypothesis that stem cell migration and transdifferentiation is the primary mechanism of effect of stem cell injection therapies.

The most commonly used type of stem cells for therapeutic use are human (autologous) Mesenchymal Stem Cells, hMSCs. hMSCs' secretome is one of the most widely researched secretome profile. The secretomes of other cell types, for example dendritic cells, are also being investigated for therapeutic use.

Studies of hMSCs aimed for examining their regenerative capacities for putative treatment of neurodegenerative diseases have demonstrated that hMSCs are able to secrete important neuroregulatory molecules, such as: brain-derived neurotrophic factor (BDNF), nerve growth factor (NGF), insulin growth factor 1 (IGF-1), hepatocyte growth factor (HGF), vascular endothelial growth factor (VEGF), transforming growth factor beta (TGF-β), glial-derived neurotrophic factor (GDNF), fibroblast growth factor 2 (FGF-2), stem cell factor (SCF), granulocyte colony-stimulating factor (G-CSF) and stromal cell-derived factor (SDF-1) both in vitro and in vivo. All of these molecules have been shown to have beneficial effects towards the treatment of neurodegenerative diseases.

With regard to orthopaedic conditions such as arthritis, the paracrine factors of stem cell-based therapies appeared to be responsible for the majority of regenerative effects. Extracellular vesicles have a prominent role in the development of joints and in the regulation of the intra-articular homeostasis. In the case of arthritis, this homeostasis is disrupted due to different reasons. Hypothetically, one reason may be related to the accumulation of senescent cells and their associated secretory phenotype. The secretome of (mesenchymal) Stem Cells have a positive effects on reestablishing the intra-articular homeostasis and stimulating regeneration by different growth factors, cytokines and miRNA that are contained within the extracellular vesicles of the secretome.

As a consequence, efforts have been made to synthesize specific stem cell secretomes efficiently, in vitro. In general, stem cells become activated and produce higher amounts of secretome in response to external stress (for example, by damaged tissues in vivo). As such, the main preconditioning mechanism to induce secretome (extracellular vesicles) production are stress-inducing methods, most prominently anoxia and hypoxia, but also pharmacological, physical or cytokine-related methods that force the cells to produce secretome in vitro. This approach is also known as cell-free stem cell therapy.

It has been hypothesized that future therapies aiming at generating a (specific) secretome with a defined profile, and optimized concentrations of paracrine factors will yield a better, more reliable and controlled outcome as compared to previous approaches that rely solely on injecting (mesenchymal) stem cells into the body and hope that their paracrine (or trans differentiation) capacity will have beneficial effects in the body. However, the controlled therapeutic use of the stem cell secretome demands high-quality standardization of isolation and analysis techniques to yield reproducible secretome preparations.

Various pharmaceutical companies and clinical institutions have started to develop protocols for the in vitro extraction of specific secretome profiles from autologous mesenchymal stem cells, as well as for the clinical use of secretome as a novel therapeutic for numerous diseases, either as a private pay procedure or within clinical trials. Even though these treatments are in compliance with the regulatory framework in Europe under certain conditions as of May 2017, there is yet no evidence for their proven efficacy in human clinical trials, besides singular case reports. Therefore, at the moment, the clinical use of stem cell secretome is experimental, and it is mainly based on in-vitro and animal data. One potential application of autologous stem cell secretome has been in veterinary medicine, as commercialized by a Russian company, T-Helper Cell Technologies in 2017 under the name Reparin-Helper.
