= Monohybrid cross =

Cross between two organisms with different variations at one genetic locus of interest

A monohybrid cross is a cross between two organisms with different variations at one genetic locus of interest. The character(s) being studied in a monohybrid cross are governed by two or multiple variations for a single location of a gene. Then carry out such a cross, each parent is chosen to be homozygous or true breeding for a given trait (locus). When a cross satisfies the conditions for a monohybrid cross, it is usually detected by a characteristic distribution of second-generation (F_{2}) offspring that is sometimes called the monohybrid ratio.

Figure 1: Inheritance pattern of dominant (red) and recessive (white) phenotypes when each parent (1) is homozygous for either the dominant or recessive trait. All members of the F_{1} generation are heterozygous and share the same dominant phenotype (2), while the F_{2} generation exhibits a 6:2 ratio of dominant to recessive phenotypes (3).

== Usage ==
Generally, the monohybrid cross is used to determine the dominance relationship between two alleles. The cross begins with the parental generation. One parent is homozygous for one allele, and the other parent is homozygous for the other allele. The offspring make up the first filial (F1) generation. Every member of the F1 generation is heterozygous and the phenotype of the F1 generation expresses the dominant trait. Crossing two members of the F1 generation produces the second filial (F2) generation. Probability theory predicts that three quarters of the F2 generation will have the dominant allele's phenotype. And the remaining quarter of the F2s will have the recessive allele's phenotype. This predicted 3:1 phenotypic ratio assumes Mendelian inheritance.

== Mendel's experiment with peas (Pisum sativum) ==
Gregor Mendel (1822–1884) was an Austrian monk who theorized basic rules of inheritance. From 1858 to 1866, he bred garden peas (Pisum sativum) in his monastery garden and analyzed the offspring of these matings. The garden pea was chosen as an experimental organism because many varieties were available that bred true for qualitative traits and their pollination could be manipulated. The seven variable characteristics Mendel investigated in pea plants were.

- seed texture (round vs wrinkled)
- seed color (yellow vs green)
- flower color (white vs purple)
- growth habit (tall vs dwarf)
- pod shape (pinched or inflated)
- pod color (green vs yellow)
- flower position (axial or terminal)

. Peas are normally self-pollinated because the stamens and carpels are enclosed within the petals. By removing the stamens from unripe flowers, Mendel could brush pollen from another variety on the carpels when they ripened.

=== First cross ===
All the peas produced in the second or hybrid generation were round.

All the peas of this F1 generation have an Rr genotype. All the haploid sperm and eggs produced by meiosis received one chromosome. All the zygotes received one R allele (from the round seed parent) and one r allele (from the wrinkled seed parent). Because the R allele is dominant to the r allele, the phenotype of all the seeds was round. The phenotypic ratio in this case of Monohybrid cross is 1.

P gametes (round parent) P gametes (wrinkled parent)	R	R
r	Rr	Rr
r	Rr	Rr

=== Second cross ===
Mendel then allowed his hybrid peas to self-pollinate. The wrinkled trait—which did not appear in his hybrid generation—reappeared in 25% of the new crop of peas.

Random union of equal numbers of R and r gametes produced an F2 generation with 25% RR and 50% Rr—both with the round phenotype—and 25% rr with the wrinkled phenotype.

F1 gametes F1 gametes	R	r
R	RR	Rr
r	Rr	rr

=== Third cross ===
Mendel then allowed some of each phenotype in the F2 generation to self-pollinate. His results:

- All the wrinkled seeds in the F2 generation produced only wrinkled seeds in the F3.
- One-third (193/565) of the round F1 seeds produced only round seeds in the F3 generation, but two-thirds (372/565) of them produced both types of seeds in the F3 and—once again—in a 3:1 ratio.

One-third of the round seeds and all of the wrinkled seeds in the F2 generation were homozygous and produced only seeds of the same phenotype.

But two thirds of the round seeds in the F2 were heterozygous and their self-pollination produced both phenotypes in the ratio of a typical F1 cross.

Phenotype ratios are approximate. The union of sperm and eggs is random. As the size of the sample gets larger, however, chance deviations become minimized and the ratios approach the theoretical predictions more closely. The table shows the actual seed production by ten of Mendel's F1 plants. While his individual plants deviated widely from the expected 3:1 ratio, the group as a whole approached it quite closely.

Round	Wrinkled
45	12
27	8
24	7
19	16
32	11
26	6
88	24
22	10
28	6
25	7
Total: 336	Total: 107

== Mendel's hypothesis ==
To explain his results, Mendel formulated a hypothesis that included the following: In the organism, there is a pair of factors that controls the appearance of a given characteristic. (They are called genes.) The organism inherits these factors from its parents, one from each. A factor is transmitted from generation to generation as a discrete, unchanging unit. (The r factor in the F2 generation passed through the round-seeded F1 generation. In spite of this, the rr seeds in the F2 generation were no less wrinkled than those in the P generation.) When the gametes are formed, the factors separate and are distributed as units to each gamete. This statement is often called Mendel's rule of segregation. If an organism has two unlike factors (called alleles) for a characteristic, one may be expressed to the total exclusion of the other (dominant vs recessive).

=== Test of the hypothesis ===
A good hypothesis meets several standards.

- It should provide an adequate explanation of the observed facts. If two or more hypotheses meet this standard, the simpler one is preferred.
- It should be able to predict new facts. So if a generalization is valid, then certain specific consequences can be deduced from it.

In order to test his hypothesis, Mendel predicted the outcome of a breeding experiment that he had not carried out yet. He crossed heterozygous round peas (Rr) with wrinkled (homozygous, rr) ones. He predicted that in this case one-half of the seeds produced would be round (Rr) and one-half wrinkled (rr).

F1 gametes P gametes	R	r
r	Rr	rr
r	Rr	rr

To a casual observer in the monastery garden, the cross appeared no different from the P cross described above: round-seeded peas being crossed with wrinkled-seeded ones. But Mendel predicted that this time he would produce both round and wrinkled seeds and in a 50:50 ratio. He performed the cross and harvested 106 round peas and 101 wrinkled peas.

Mendel tested his hypothesis with a type of backcross called a testcross. An organism has an unknown genotype which is one of two genotypes (like RR and Rr) that produce the same phenotype. The result of the test identifies the unknown genotype.

Mendel did not stop there. He went on to cross pea varieties that differed in six other qualitative traits. In every case, the results supported his hypothesis. He crossed peas that differed in two traits. He found that the inheritance of one trait was independent of that of the other and so framed his second rule: the rule of independent assortment. Today, it is known that this rule does not apply to some genes, due to genetic linkage.

== See also ==
- Dihybrid cross
- Test cross
