= Stem cell tourism =

Stem cell tourism, a form of medical tourism, is the internet based-industry in which stem cell procedures are advertised to the public as a proven cure. In the majority of cases, it leads to patients and families traveling abroad to obtain procedures that are not proven, nor part of a clinical trial approved by an authority like the Food and Drug Administration in the United States. These procedures have not gone through the vetting process of clinical research and they lack rigorous scientific support. Although for the general public, this advertising in glossy websites, may sound authoritative, for translational doctors and scientists this leads to the exploitation of vulnerable patients. These procedures lack the reproducibility, the rigor that is required for successful development of new effective medications. Although the term may imply traveling overseas, in recent years, there has been an explosion of "stem cell clinics' in the US which has been well documented. These activities are highly profitable for the clinic but no benefit for the patients, sometimes experiencing complications like spinal tumors, death, or financial ruin, all of which are documented in the scientific literature. There is a great deal of interest in educating the public and patients, families and doctors who deal with patients requesting stem cells clinics. In recent years, the FDA has become more active in overseeing stem cell clinics, taking a number of concrete steps including sending warning letters, putting out advisories, and in two cases filing suit in federal court to impose permanent injunctions on specific clinic firms.

Despite the interest generated in the public for the use of stem cells, among all stem cell scientists, including the International Society for Stem Cell Research, the largest academic organization of scientists and advocates for stem cell research in the world. Stem cell "therapy" is an aspirational goal, is still under development and although there is a great deal of research around the world. Rigorous stem cell trials are still ongoing and patients should be educated to be aware of the unethical clinics in the US or abroad, that offer stem cells procedures as a cure when it is still under investigation.

Furthermore, there is confusion in the general public between the concept of the "right to try" (RTT) legislation to the right to pursue any"stem cell preparations'. These are different concepts. RTT is usually approved for promising pharmacological compounds that have earned a sound scientific or pre-clinical support. In contrast to stem cell tourism infusions that do not. One of the key elements in the RTT is the concept of promising, that is not just a theoretical possibility but a demonstrable and reproducible evidence obtained by scientific experimentation. The right to try legislation seeks opportunities for incurables and often terminal patients to receive the compassionate use of experimental therapies that have passed phase I clinical trials that have not gone through all the checks and balances needed for approval. In contrast to the stem cell tourism, these trials have oversight by the FDA and there is no direct financial exploitation for the patient and families.
