= Bodo-Eckehard Strauer =

German cardiologist (born 1943)

Professor Bodo-Eckehard Strauer (born 16 January 1943) is a German cardiologist who has made award-winning contributions to cardiovascular science including pivotal reports that transfusions of patients' own bone marrow cells into the coronary arteries can increase the pumping efficacy of a weak heart. These landmark publications have been the basis for the new field of autologous bone marrow stem cell therapy for heart disease. In a press statement on 24 February 2014, his institution reported that it had found "evidence of scientific misconduct", and that it had sent a report "to the city’s public prosecutors".

== Life ==
He received his doctorate in 1966 and his habilitation in 1973. He began as senior physician at the Klinikum Großhadern. In 1984 he became Head of Department of Internal Medicine-Cardiology at the University of Marburg. Later he became director of the Department of Cardiology, Pneumology and Angiology of the University Hospital of Düsseldorf. In February 2009, he stopped clinical work in Düsseldorf but continued his academic work there and started active collaborative research with the University of Rostock.

== Cardiac stem cell therapy ==
While his early research was into hypertensive heart disease, his notable contributions were his novel approach to improving cardiac function by bone-marrow derived stem cell treatment involving injections into the coronary arteries with consistent large favorable effects.

His laboratory has led the field, reporting strongly positive effects in every heart condition studied. The burgeoning scientific arena of cardiac stem cell therapeutics, with research programs in dozens of university hospitals, and commercial products from a variety of newly constructed corporations, is based on his pioneering methods and progressively broadening breakthroughs since 2001.

In December 2012, Süddeutsche Zeitung reported concerns that the research he published may have inconsistencies. The University Hospital of Düsseldorf conducted an investigation in mid-2012 but no results have been revealed.

In June 2013, many of the impressive reports from the group were alleged to be in breach of the laws of arithmetic. Dr Strauer replied through his lawyer that the majority of the several hundred discrepancies were minor and had been corrected. Over 200 factual contradictions remain in the unretracted publications from the group, with one widely cited publication having such a large number of impossible features that it is now used a test of observational skill. The field has been labelled by the editor of the parent journal as a "fraud scandal".

In February 2014, the journal Nature reported that a university investigation committee in Düsseldorf had "found evidence of scientific misconduct in papers reporting the trials’ findings". It continued, "The university has referred the committee’s report to an internal disciplinary procedure, which is not expected to draw a conclusion until next year. In the meantime the university is providing no further public information about the nature of the misconduct — nor the outcome of a parallel investigation into the whether clinical trials involving 537 patients complied with rules of Good Clinical Practice and the provisions of the German Medicines Act. But Benedikt Pannen, acting CEO of the University Hospital in Düsseldorf, says that the report of the clinical investigation had been sent to the city’s public prosecutors."

== Awards for Scientific Discoveries ==
- 1972 Byk-Gulden Research Award
- 1976 Paul-Martini-Preis
- 1978 Theodor-Frerichs-Preis
- 1985 Prize of the German Therapy Week
- 1987 Franz-Gross Science Award
- 2010 Bundesverdienstkreuz (Federal Cross of Merit) First Class
- 2011 Medica Plaque of Merit for Medical Education
