= Bacillary band =

Anatomic structure in nematodes

A bacillary band is a specialized row of longitudinal cells of some nematodes (Trichuris and Capillaria), consisting of glandular and nonglandular cells, formed by the hypodermis. The glandular cells opens up to the exterior through cuticular pores. The function of bacillary bands is unknown, their ultrastructure suggests that the gland cells may have a role in ion or osmotic regulation, and the nongland cells may function in cuticle formation and food storage.
