= Test cross =

Concept in classical genetics

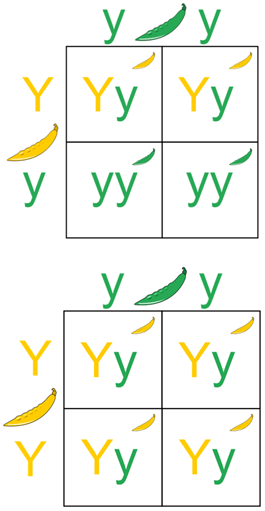
Punnett squares showing typical test crosses and the two potential outcomes. The individual in question may either be heterozygous, in which half the offspring would be heterozygous and half would be homozygous recessive, or homozygous dominant, in which all the offspring would be heterozygous.

Under the law of dominance in genetics, an individual expressing a dominant phenotype could contain either two copies of the dominant allele (homozygous dominant) or one copy of each dominant and recessive allele (heterozygous dominant). By performing a test cross, one can determine whether the individual is heterozygous or homozygous dominant.

In a test cross, the individual in question is bred with another individual that is homozygous for the recessive trait and the offspring of the test cross are examined. Since the homozygous recessive individual can only pass on recessive alleles, the allele the individual in question passes on determines the phenotype of the offspring. Thus, this test yields 2 possible situations:

1. If any of the offspring produced express the recessive trait, the individual in question is heterozygous for the dominant allele.
2. If all of the offspring produced express the dominant trait, the individual in question is homozygous for the dominant allele.

== History ==
The first uses of test crosses were in Gregor Mendel’s experiments in plant hybridization. While studying the inheritance of dominant and recessive traits in pea plants, he explains that the “signification” (now termed zygosity) of an individual for a dominant trait is determined by the expression patterns of the following generation.

Rediscovery of Mendel’s work in the early 1900s led to an explosion of experiments employing the principles of test crosses. From 1908-1911, Thomas Hunt Morgan conducted test crosses while determining the inheritance pattern of a white eye-colour mutation in Drosophila. These test cross experiments became hallmarks in the discovery of sex-linked traits.

== Test cross types ==
A test cross involves crossing an individual organism with a dominant genotype or phenotype with another organism exhibiting a recessive genotype or phenotype. To better grasp the concept of test crossing, let's explore various types of crosses involving one or more genes of interest.

=== Monohybrid crosses (single-gene test cross) ===
Monohybrid crossing is a fertilization process which entails two purebred parents that consist of a difference in only one characteristic, where the resulting offspring become monohybrids. It is utilized to test only one type of gene or phenotype.

Monohybrid, also called “single gene test cross”, is used to observe how homozygous offspring express heterozygous genotypes inherited from their parents.

The implantation of monohybrid crossing includes signifying the alleles by using characters – recessive allele often is indicated with a lower-case letter, and the dominant allele is indicated with an upper-case letter. The phenotype and the genotype of both parents being crossed are noted, including the genotype of the gametes from the parental generation. The predictions of the combinations of the gametes will be constructed on a Punnett square.

In conducting a monohybrid cross, Mendel initiated the experiment with a pair of pea plants exhibiting contrasting traits, one being tall and the other dwarf. Through cross-pollination, the resulting offspring plants manifested the tall trait. These first-generation hybrids were termed F1, with their offspring referred to as Filial or F1 progeny.

Mendel observed that characteristics that were absent in F1 generation had reappeared in the F2 generation. He referred the suppressed characteristic as recessive and the expressed characteristics as dominant characteristic.

=== Dihybrid crosses (two-gene test cross) ===
Mendel furthermore determined to explore the outcome of crossing two plants that were hybrids for a single trait. This investigation aimed to determinate the inheritance patterns of two characteristics simultaneously and to verify the hypothesis that the inheritance of one trait would remain independent of the other. Termed a dihybrid cross or “two-gene test cross”, this experiment was grounded in the principle of segregation. When conducting a dihybrid test cross, two dominant phenotypic characteristics are selected and crossed with parents displaying double recessive traits. The phenotypic characteristics of the F1 generation are then analyzed. In such a test cross, if the individual being tested is heterozygous, a phenotypic ratio of 1:1:1:1 is typically observed.

To test Mendel’s idea, he performed complex crosses with plants that were purebred for two characteristics: seed color (yellow and green), seed shape (round and wrinkled). He crossed plants with wrinkled and yellow seeds and plants with round and green seeds. Due to earlier cross testing with monohybrids, Mendel anticipated that the round and yellow seeds were dominant with the purebred crossing, and that is what he observed.

== Applications in model organisms ==
Microscopic image of Caenorhabditis elegans, a free-living, transparent nematode (roundworm).

Test crosses have a variety of applications. Model organisms, such as Caenorhabditis elegans and Drosophila melanogaster, are commonly used for test crosses. Basic procedures for performing test crosses in these organisms are provided below:

=== C. elegans ===
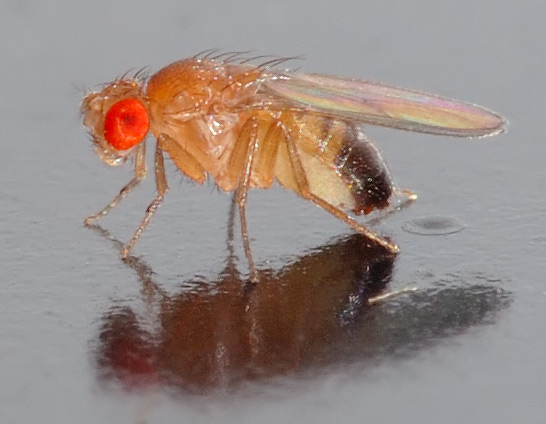
Drosophila melanogaster

To perform a test cross with C. elegans, place worms with a known recessive genotype with worms of an unknown genotype on an agar plate. Allow the male and hermaphrodite worms time to mate and produce offspring. Using a microscope, the ratio of recessive versus dominant phenotype will elucidate the genotype of the dominant parent.

=== D. melanogaster ===
To perform a test cross with D. melanogaster, select a trait with a known dominant and recessive phenotype. Red eye colour is dominant and white is recessive. Obtain virgin females with white eyes, young males with red eyes, and put them into a single tube. Once offspring begin to appear as larvae, remove parental lines and observe the phenotype of adult offsprings.

== Limitations ==
There are many limitations to test crosses. It can be a time-consuming process as some organisms require a long growing time in each generation to show the necessary phenotype. A large number of offspring are also required to have reliable data due to statistics. Test crosses are only useful if dominance is complete. Incomplete dominance is when the dominant allele and recessive allele come together to form a blend of the two phenotypes in the offspring. Test crosses are also not applicable with codominant genes, where both phenotypes of a heterozygote trait will be expressed. Another limitation is for epistatic mutations where the expression of a gene will be overpowered by the expression of another gene. A trait can also be determined by multiple genes, known as polygenic inheritance. Genes also have different levels of penetrance, which determines how much they will be expressed. In addition, the environment affects the expression of numerous genes, therefore making the test cross inapplicable in many cases.

As more advanced techniques to determine genotype emerge, the test cross is becoming less prevalent in genetics. Genetic testing and genome mapping are modern advances which allow for more efficient and detailed information about one’s genotype to be determined. Test crosses, however, are still used to this day and have created an excellent foundation for the development of more sophisticated techniques.
