= Dihybrid cross =

Concept in genetics

Gregor Mendel’s dihybrid cross experiment with pea plants.

Dihybrid cross is a cross between two individuals with two observed traits that are controlled by two distinct genes. The idea of a dihybrid cross came from Gregor Mendel when he observed pea plants that were either yellow or green and either round or wrinkled. Crossing of two heterozygous individuals will result in predictable ratios for both genotype and phenotype in the offspring. The expected phenotypic ratio of crossing heterozygous parents would be 9:3:3:1. Deviations from these expected ratios may indicate that the two traits are linked or that one or both traits has a non-Mendelian mode of inheritance.

== Mendelian History ==
Gregor Mendel was an Austrian-Czech monk who bred peas plants in his monastery garden and compared the offspring to figure out inheritance of traits from 1856-1863. He first started looking at individual traits, but began to look at two distinct traits in the same plant. In his first experiment, he looked at the two distinct traits of pea color (yellow or green) and pea shape (round or wrinkled). He applied the same rules of a monohybrid cross to create the dihybrid cross. From these experiments, he determined the phenotypic ratio (9:3:3:1) seen in dihybrid cross for a heterozygous cross.

Through these experiments, he was able to determine the basic law of independent assortment and law of dominance. The law of independent assortment states that traits controlled by different genes are going to be inherited independently of each other. Mendel was able to determine this law out because in his crosses he was able to get all four possible phenotypes. The law of dominance states that if one dominant allele is inherited then the dominant phenotype will be expressed.

== Expected genotype and phenotype ratios ==
The phenotypic ratio of a cross between two heterozygotes is 9:3:3:1, where 9/16 of the individuals possess the dominant phenotype for both traits, 3/16 of the individuals possess the dominant phenotype for one trait, 3/16 of the individuals possess the dominant phenotype for the other trait, and 1/16 are recessive for both traits. Valid only for Angiosperms or similar sexually reproducing organisms. This is assuming that Mendel's laws are followed.

The expected phenotypic ratio of 9:3:3:1 can be broken down into:

- the 9 represents the proportion of individuals displaying both dominant traits: 1 x RRYY + 2 x RRYy + 2 x RrYY + 4 x RrYy
- the first 3 represents the individuals displaying the first dominant trait and the second recessive trait: 1 x RRyy + 2 x Rryy
- the second 3 represents those displaying the first recessive trait and second dominant trait: 1 x rrYY + 2 x rrYy
- the 1 represents the homozygous, displaying both recessive traits: 1 x rryy
- The genotypic ratio are: RRYY 1: RRYy 2: RRyy 1: RrYY 2: RrYy 4: Rryy 2: rrYY 1: rrYy 2: rryy 1

In the example pictured, RRYY/rryy parents result in F_{1} offspring that are heterozygous for both R and Y (RrYy).

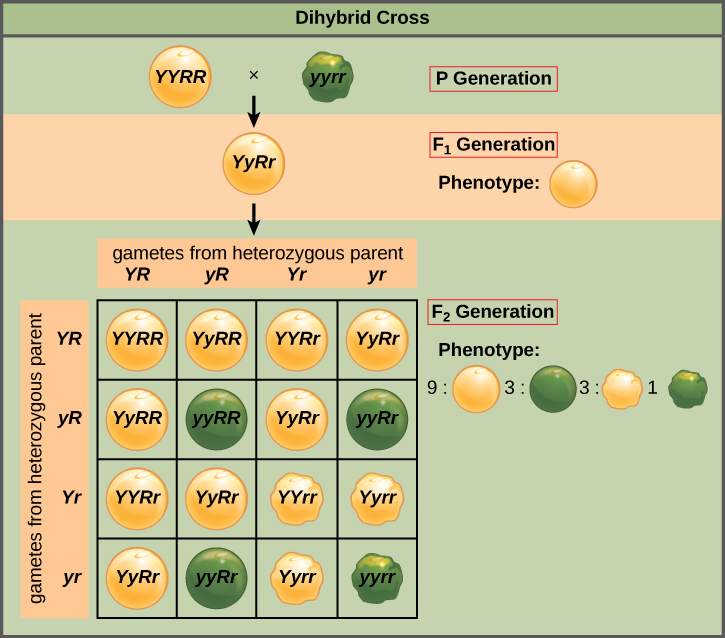
This is a dihybrid cross of two heterozygous parents. The traits observed in this cross are the same traits that Mendel was observing for his experiments. This cross results in the expected phenotypic ratio of 9:3:3:1.

Another example is listed in the table below and illustrates the process of a dihybrid cross between pea plants with multiple traits and their phenotypic ratio patterns. Dihybrid crosses are easily visualized using a 4 x 4 Punnett square. In these squares, the dominant traits are uppercase, and the recessive traits of the same characteristic is lowercase.

- In the following case the example of pea plant seed is chosen. The two characteristics being compared are
1. Shape: round or wrinkled (Round (R) is dominant)
2. Color: yellow or green (Yellow (Y) is dominant)
- This implies that Rr will be a round seed and Yy will be a yellow seed. Only rr will be a wrinkled seed and yy will be a green seed.

F_{1}Gametes F_{1} Gametes	RY	Ry	rY	ry
RY	RRYY	RRYy	RrYY	RrYy
Ry	RRYy	RRyy	RrYy	Rryy
rY	RrYY	RrYy	rrYY	rrYy
ry	RrYy	Rryy	rrYy	rryy

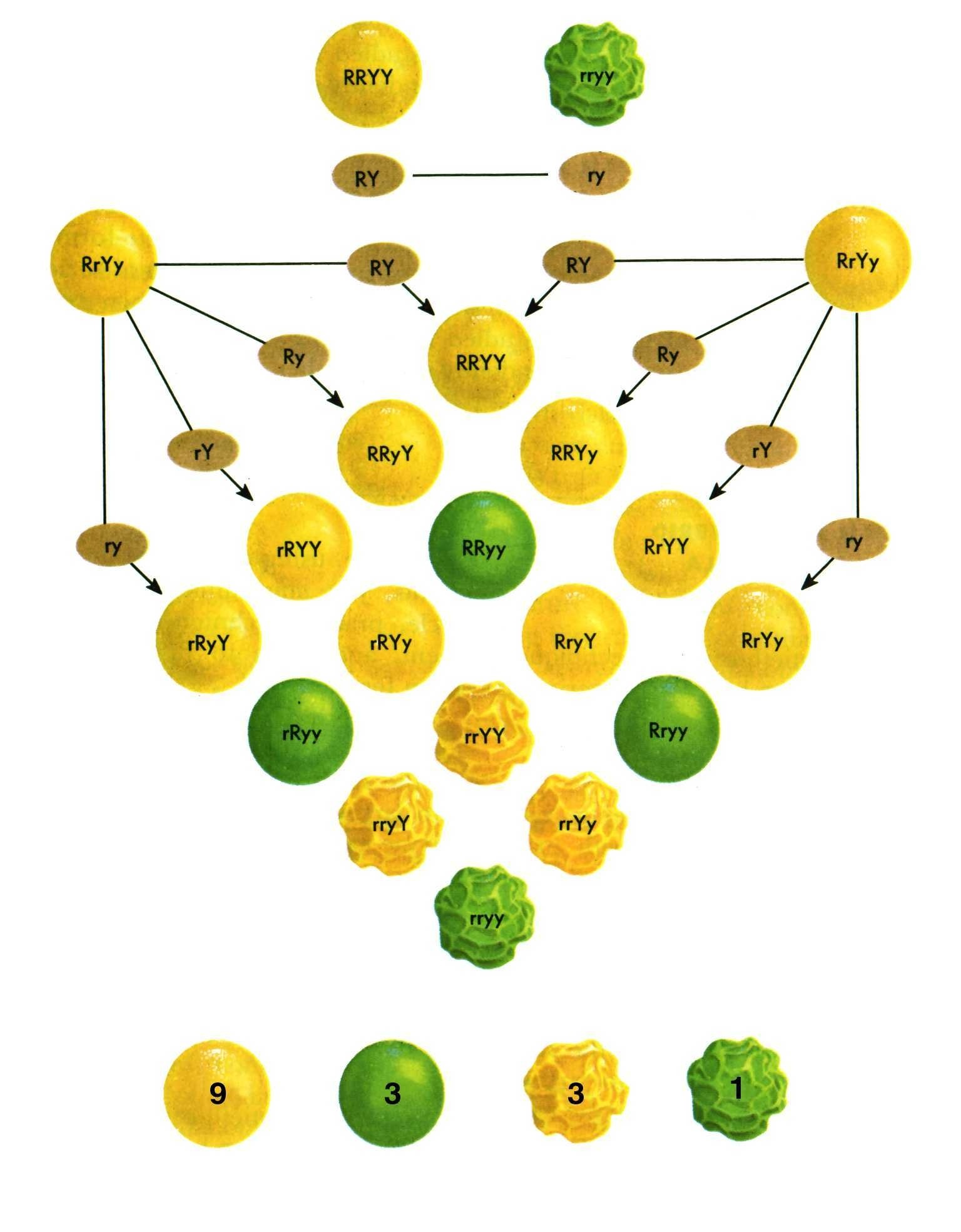

== See also ==
- Gregor Mendel
- William Bateson
- Mendelian inheritance
  - Law of dominance
  - Law of segregation
  - Law of independent assortment
  - Monohybrid cross
