= Viridamide =

Viridamide A

Viridamide B

Viridamides are bio-active lipodepsipeptides made by marine cyanobacteria.
