= Punnett square =

Tabular summary of genetic combinations

A Punnett square showing a typical test cross. (Green pod color is dominant over yellow for pea pods in contrast to pea seeds, where yellow cotyledon color is dominant over green).

Punnett squares for each combination of parents' colour vision status giving probabilities of their offsprings' status, each cell having 25% probability in theory.

The Punnett square is a square diagram that is used to predict the genotypes of a particular cross or breeding experiment. It is named after Reginald C. Punnett, who devised the approach in 1905. The diagram is used by biologists to determine the probability of an offspring having a particular genotype. The Punnett square is a tabular summary of possible combinations of maternal alleles with paternal alleles. These tables can be used to examine the genotypical outcome probabilities on the offspring of a single trait (allele), or when crossing multiple traits from the parents.

The Punnett square is a visual representation of Mendelian inheritance, a fundamental concept in genetics discovered by Gregor Mendel. For multiple traits, using the "forked-line method" is typically much easier than the Punnett square. Phenotypes may be predicted with at least better-than-chance accuracy using a Punnett square, but the phenotype that may appear in the presence of a given genotype can in some instances be influenced by many other factors, as when polygenic inheritance and/or epigenetics are at work.

== Zygosity ==
Zygosity refers to the grade of similarity between the alleles that determine one specific trait in an organism. In its simplest form, a pair of alleles can be either homozygous or heterozygous. Homozygosity, with homo relating to same while zygous pertains to a zygote, is seen when a combination of either two dominant or two recessive alleles code for the same trait. Recessive are always lowercase letters. For example, using 'A' as the representative character for each allele, a homozygous dominant pair's genotype would be depicted as 'AA', while homozygous recessive is shown as 'aa'. Heterozygosity, with hetero associated with different, can only be 'Aa' (the capital letter is always presented first by convention). The phenotype of a homozygous dominant pair is 'A', or dominant, while the opposite is true for homozygous recessive. Heterozygous pairs always have a dominant phenotype. To a lesser degree, hemizygosity and nullizygosity can also be seen in gene pairs.

== Monohybrid cross ==
"Mono-" means "one"; this cross indicates that the examination of a single trait. This could mean (for example) eye color. Each genetic locus is always represented by two letters. So in the case of eye color, say "B = Brown eyes" and "b = green eyes". In this example, both parents have the genotype Bb. For the example of eye color, this would mean they both have brown eyes. They can produce gametes that contain either the B or the b allele. (It is conventional in genetics to use capital letters to indicate dominant alleles and lower-case letters to indicate recessive alleles.) The probability of an individual offspring's having the genotype BB is 25%, Bb is 50%, and bb is 25%. The ratio of the phenotypes is 3:1, typical for a monohybrid cross. When assessing phenotype from this, 3 of the offspring have "Brown" eyes and only one offspring has "green" eyes. (3 are "B?" and 1 is "bb")

Paternal Maternal	B	b
B	BB	Bb
b	Bb	bb

The way in which the B and b alleles interact with each other to affect the appearance of the offspring depends on how the gene products (proteins) interact (see Mendelian inheritance). This can include lethal effects and epistasis (where one allele masks another, regardless of dominant or recessive status).

== Dihybrid cross ==
More complicated crosses can be made by looking at two or more genes. The Punnett square works, however, only if the genes are independent of each other, which means that having a particular allele of gene "A" does not alter the probability of possessing an allele of gene "B". This is equivalent to stating that the genes are not linked, so that the two genes do not tend to sort together during meiosis.

The following example illustrates a dihybrid cross between two double-heterozygote pea plants. R represents the dominant allele for shape (round), while r represents the recessive allele (wrinkled). Y represents the dominant allele for color (yellow), while y represents the recessive allele (green). If each plant has the genotype RrYy, and since the alleles for shape and color genes are independent, then they can produce four types of gametes with all possible combinations: RY, Ry, rY, and ry.

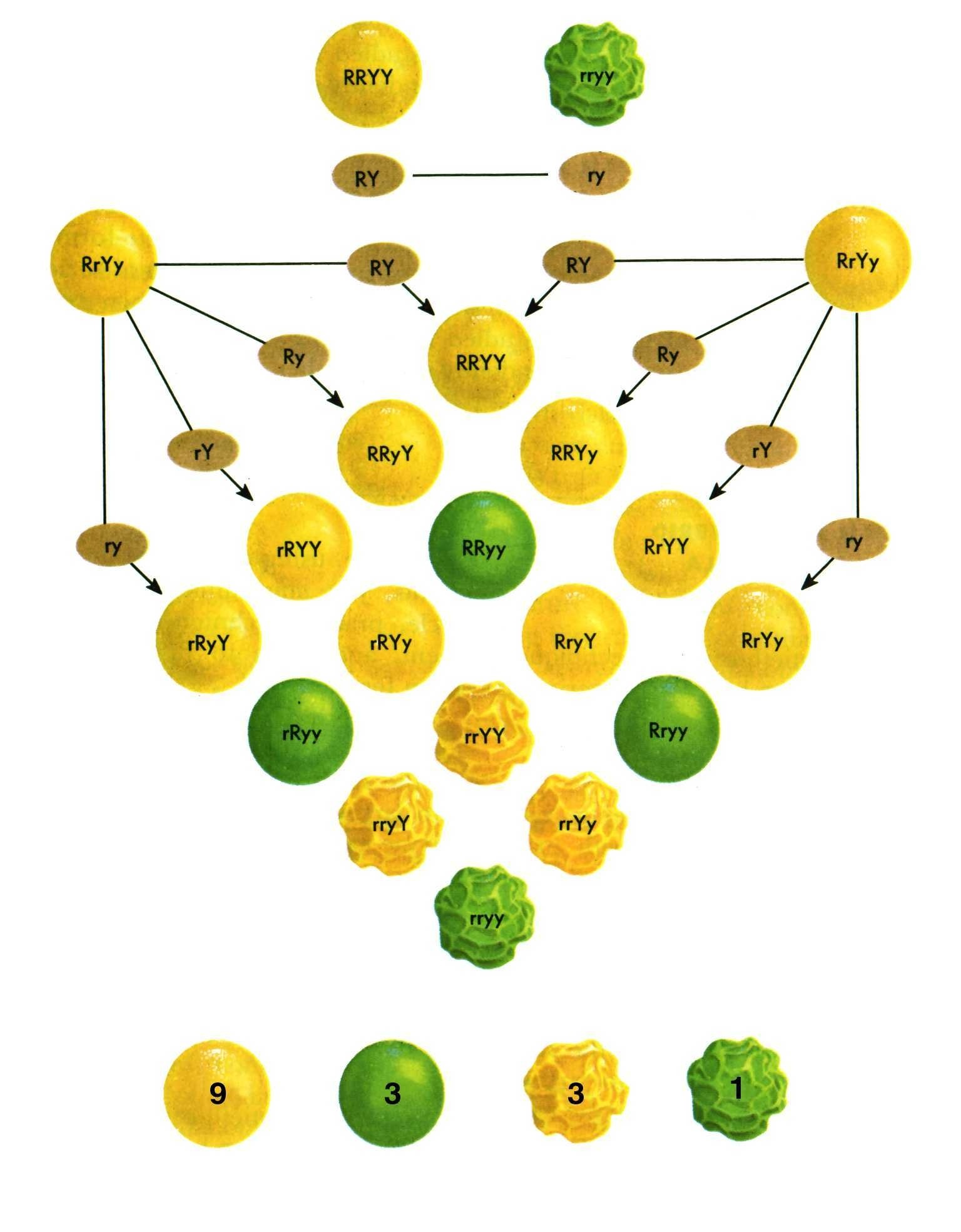

	RY	Ry	rY	ry
RY	RRYY	RRYy	RrYY	RrYy
Ry	RRYy	RRyy	RrYy	Rryy
rY	RrYY	RrYy	rrYY	rrYy
ry	RrYy	Rryy	rrYy	rryy

Since dominant traits mask recessive traits (assuming no epistasis), there are nine combinations that have the phenotype round yellow, three that are round green, three that are wrinkled yellow, and one that is wrinkled green. The ratio 9:3:3:1 is the expected outcome when crossing two double-heterozygous parents with unlinked genes. Any other ratio indicates that something else has occurred (such as lethal alleles, epistasis, linked genes, etc.).

=== Forked-line method ===
The forked-line method (also known as the tree method and the branching system) can also solve dihybrid and multi-hybrid crosses. A problem is converted to a series of monohybrid crosses, and the results are combined in a tree. However, a tree produces the same result as a Punnett square in less time and with more clarity. The example below assesses another double-heterozygote cross using RrYy x RrYy. As stated above, the phenotypic ratio is expected to be 9:3:3:1 if crossing unlinked genes from two double-heterozygotes. The genotypic ratio was obtained in the diagram below, this diagram will have more branches than if only analyzing for phenotypic ratio.

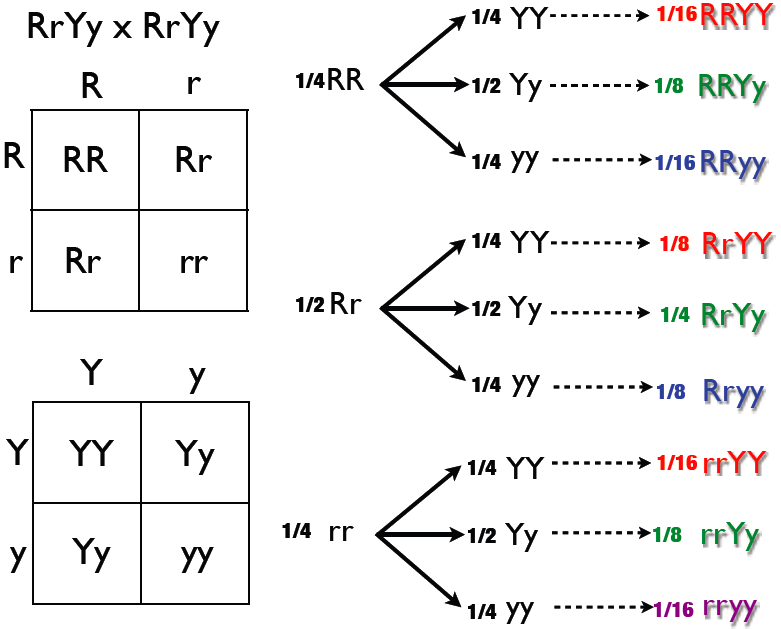

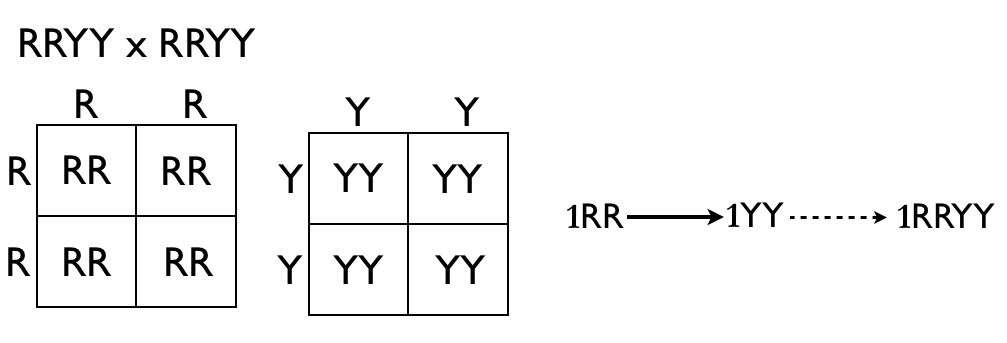

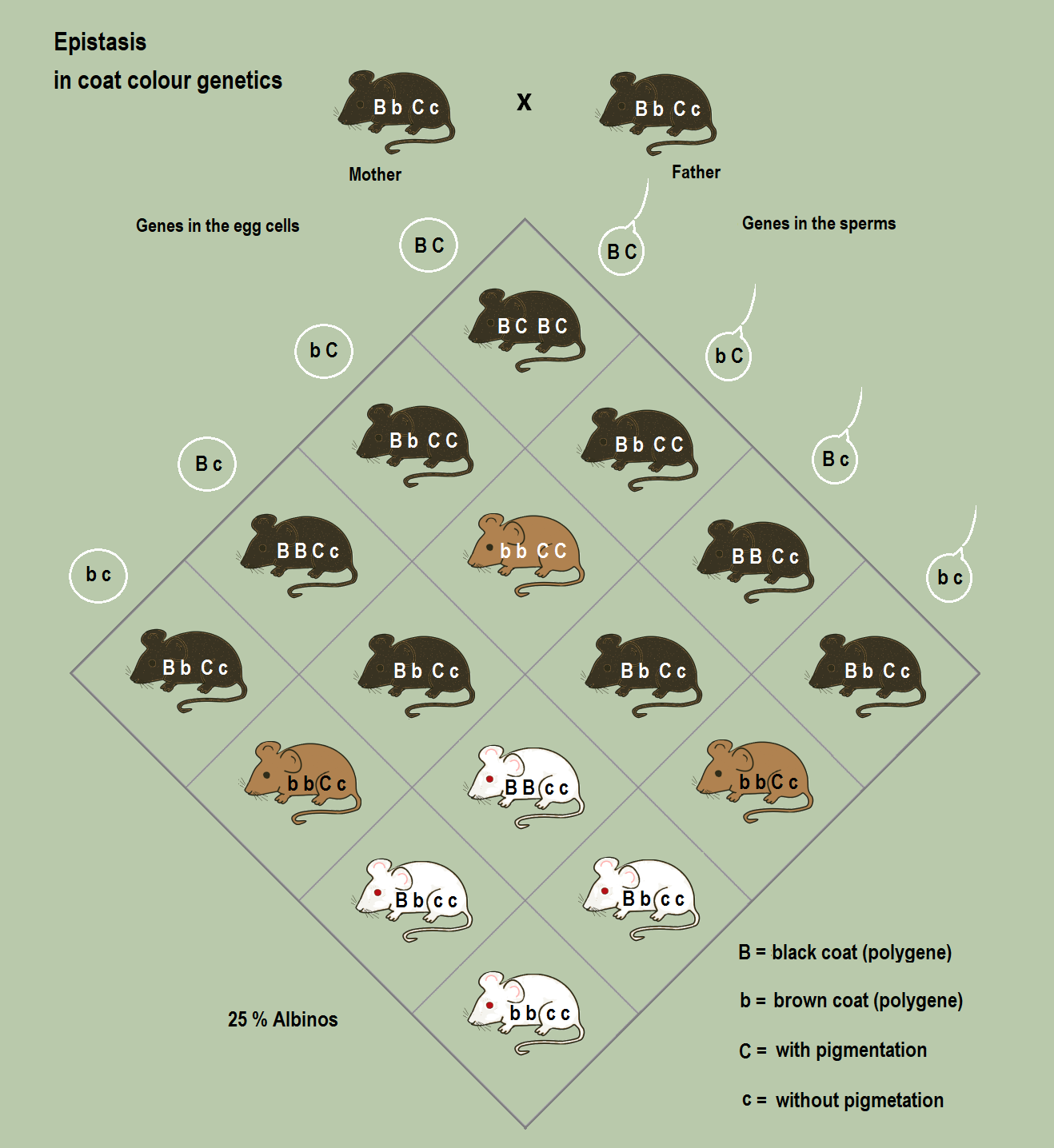
There are also Punnett squares for epistasis. In these cases the genotype epistatic over the other genes hinders their expression in the phenotype.

== See also ==
- Mendelian inheritance
- Karnaugh map, a similar diagram used for Boolean algebra simplification
