= Vesicle (biology and chemistry) =

Any small, fluid-filled, spherical organelle enclosed by a membrane

Scheme of a liposome formed by phospholipids in an aqueous solution

In cell biology, a vesicle is an organelle within or outside a cell, consisting of liquid or cytoplasm enclosed by a lipid bilayer.

Vesicles form naturally during the processes of secretion (exocytosis), uptake (endocytosis), and the transport of materials within the plasma membrane.

Alternatively, they may be prepared artificially, in which case they are called liposomes (not to be confused with lysosomes).

If there is only one phospholipid bilayer, the vesicles are called unilamellar liposomes; otherwise they are called multilamellar liposomes.

The membrane enclosing the vesicle is also a lamellar phase, similar to that of the plasma membrane, and intracellular vesicles can fuse with the plasma membrane to release their contents outside the cell. Vesicles can also fuse with other organelles within the cell.

A vesicle released from the cell is known as an extracellular vesicle.

Vesicles perform a variety of functions. Because it is separated from the cytosol, the inside of the vesicle can be made to be different from the cytosolic environment. For this reason, vesicles are a basic tool used by the cell for organizing cellular substances.

Vesicles are involved in metabolism, transport, buoyancy control, and temporary storage of food and enzymes. They can also act as chemical reaction chambers.

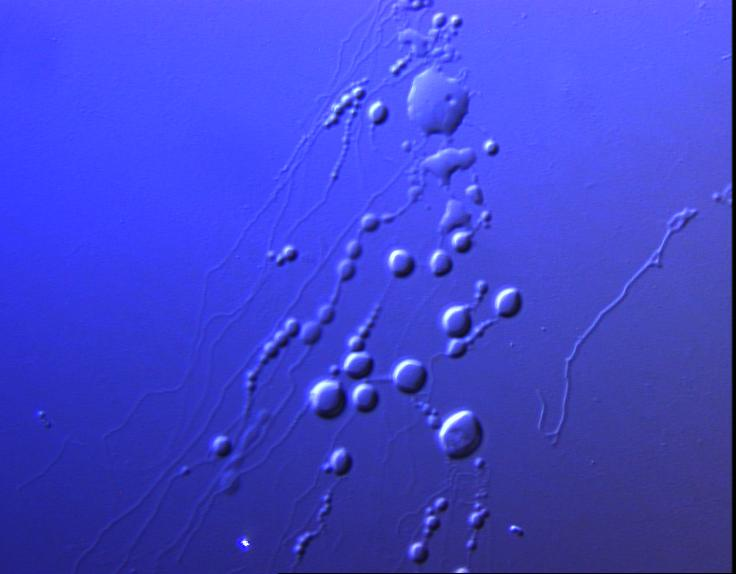
Sarfus image of lipid vesicles

IUPAC definition

Closed structure formed by amphiphilic molecules that contains solvent (usually water).

The 2013 Nobel Prize in Physiology or Medicine was shared by James Rothman, Randy Schekman and Thomas Südhof for their roles in elucidating (building upon earlier research, some of it by their mentors) the makeup and function of cell vesicles, especially in yeasts and in humans, including information on each vesicle's parts and how they are assembled. Vesicle dysfunction is thought to contribute to Alzheimer's disease, diabetes, some hard-to-treat cases of epilepsy, some cancers and immunological disorders and certain neurovascular conditions.

== Types of vesicular structures ==
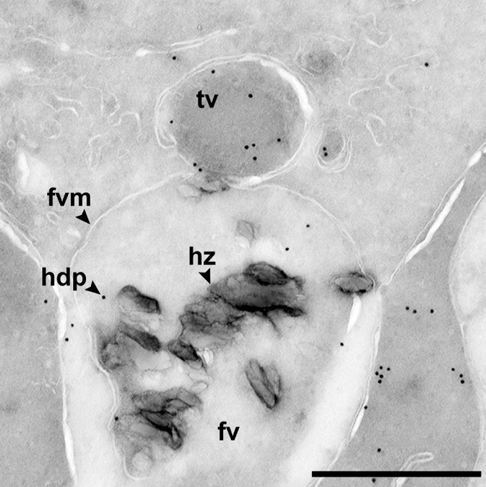
Electron micrograph of a cell containing a food vacuole (fv) and transport vacuole (tv) in a malaria parasite

=== Vacuoles ===
Vacuoles are cellular organelles that contain mostly water.

- Plant cells have a large central vacuole in the center of the cell that is used for osmotic control and nutrient storage.
- Contractile vacuoles are found in certain protists, especially those in Phylum Ciliophora. These vacuoles take water from the cytoplasm and excrete it from the cell to avoid bursting due to osmotic pressure.

=== Lysosomes ===
- Lysosomes are involved in cellular digestion. Food can be taken from outside the cell into food vacuoles by a process called endocytosis. These food vacuoles fuse with lysosomes which break down the components so that they can be used in the cell. This form of cellular eating is called phagocytosis.
- Lysosomes are also used to destroy defective or damaged organelles in a process called autophagy. They fuse with the membrane of the damaged organelle, digesting it.

=== Transport vesicles ===
- Transport vesicles can move molecules between locations inside the cell, e.g., proteins from the rough endoplasmic reticulum to the Golgi apparatus.
- Membrane-bound and secreted proteins are made on ribosomes found in the rough endoplasmic reticulum. Most of these proteins mature in the Golgi apparatus before going to their final destination, which may be to lysosomes, peroxisomes, or outside the cell. These proteins travel within the cell inside transport vesicles.

=== Secretory vesicles ===
Secretory vesicles contain materials that are to be excreted from the cell. Cells have many reasons to excrete materials. One reason is to dispose of wastes. Another reason is tied to the function of the cell. Within a larger organism, some cells are specialized to produce certain chemicals. These chemicals are stored in secretory vesicles and released when needed.

==== Types ====
- Synaptic vesicles are located at presynaptic terminals in neurons and store neurotransmitters called quanta. When a signal comes down an axon, the synaptic vesicles fuse with the cell membrane releasing the neurotransmitter so that it can be detected by receptor molecules on the next nerve cell.
- In animals, endocrine tissues release hormones into the bloodstream. These hormones are stored within secretory vesicles. A good example is an endocrine tissue found in the islets of Langerhans in the pancreas. This tissue contains many cell types that are defined by which hormones they produce.
- Secretory vesicles hold the enzymes that are used to make the cell walls of plants, protists, fungi, bacteria and archaea cells, as well as the extracellular matrix of animal cells.
- Bacteria, archaea, fungi and parasites release membrane vesicles (MVs) containing varied but specialized toxic compounds and biochemical signal molecules, which are transported to target cells to initiate processes in favour of the microbe, which include invasion of host cells and killing of competing microbes in the same niche.

=== Extracellular vesicles ===
Extracellular vesicles (EVs) are lipid bilayer-delimited particles produced by all cells including bacteria.

==== Types ====
- Ectosomes/microvesicles are shed directly from the plasma membrane and can range in size from around 30 nm to larger than a micron in diameter). These may include large particles such as apoptotic blebs released by dying cells, large oncosomes released by some cancer cells, or "exophers," released by nematode neurons and mouse cardiomyocytes.
- Exosomes: membranous vesicles of endocytic origin (30-100 nm diameter).

Different types of EVs may be separated based on density (by gradient differential centrifugation), size, or surface markers. However, EV subtypes have an overlapping size and density ranges, and subtype-unique markers must be established on a cell-by-cell basis. Therefore, it is difficult to pinpoint the biogenesis pathway that gave rise to a particular EV after it has left the cell.

In humans, endogenous extracellular vesicles likely play a role in coagulation, intercellular signaling and waste management. They are also implicated in the pathophysiological processes involved in multiple diseases, including cancer. Extracellular vesicles have raised interest as a potential source of biomarker discovery because of their role in intercellular communication, release into easily accessible body fluids and the resemblance of their molecular content to that of the releasing cells. The extracellular vesicles of (mesenchymal) stem cells, also known as the secretome of stem cells, are being researched and applied for therapeutic purposes, predominantly degenerative, auto-immune and/or inflammatory diseases.

In Gram-negative bacteria, EVs are produced by the pinching off of the outer membrane; however, how EVs escape the thick cell walls of Gram-positive bacteria, mycobacteria and fungi is still unknown. These EVs contain varied cargo, including nucleic acids, toxins, lipoproteins and enzymes and have important roles in microbial physiology and pathogenesis. In host–pathogen interactions, gram negative bacteria produce vesicles which play roles in establishing a colonization niche, carrying and transmitting virulence factors into host cells and modulating host defense and response.

Ocean cyanobacteria have been found to continuously release vesicles containing proteins, DNA and RNA into the open ocean. Vesicles carrying DNA from diverse bacteria are abundant in coastal and open-ocean seawater samples.

=== Protocells ===
The RNA world hypothesis assumes that the first self-replicating genomes were strands of RNA. This hypothesis contains the idea that RNA strands formed ribozymes (folded RNA molecules) capable of catalyzing RNA replication. These primordial biological catalysis were considered to be contained within vesicles (protocells) with membranes composed of fatty acids and related amphiphiles. Template-directed RNA synthesis by the copying of RNA templates inside fatty acid vesicles has been demonstrated by Adamata and Szostak.

=== Other types ===
Gas vesicles are used by archaea, bacteria and planktonic microorganisms, possibly to control vertical migration by regulating the gas content and thereby buoyancy, or possibly to position the cell for maximum solar light harvesting. These vesicles are typically lemon-shaped or cylindrical tubes made out of protein; their diameter determines the strength of the vesicle with larger ones being weaker. The diameter of the vesicle also affects its volume and how efficiently it can provide buoyancy. In cyanobacteria, natural selection has worked to create vesicles that are at the maximum diameter possible while still being structurally stable. The protein skin is permeable to gases but not water, keeping the vesicles from flooding.

Matrix vesicles are located within the extracellular space, or matrix. Using electron microscopy, they were discovered independently in 1967 by H. Clarke Anderson and Ermanno Bonucci. These cell-derived vesicles are specialized to initiate biomineralisation of the matrix in a variety of tissues, including bone, cartilage and dentin. During normal calcification, a major influx of calcium and phosphate ions into the cells accompanies cellular apoptosis (genetically determined self-destruction) and matrix vesicle formation. Calcium-loading also leads to formation of phosphatidylserine:calcium:phosphate complexes in the plasma membrane mediated in part by a protein called annexins. Matrix vesicles bud from the plasma membrane at sites of interaction with the extracellular matrix. Thus, matrix vesicles convey to the extracellular matrix calcium, phosphate, lipids and the annexins which act to nucleate mineral formation. These processes are precisely coordinated to bring about, at the proper place and time, mineralization of the tissue's matrix unless the Golgi are non-existent.

Multivesicular body, or MVB, is a membrane-bound vesicle containing a number of smaller vesicles.

== Formation and transport ==
Cell biology
- Animal cell diagram
- Components of a typical animal cell: 1. Nucleolus; 2. Nucleus; 3. Ribosome (dots as part of 5); 4. Vesicle; 5. Rough endoplasmic reticulum 6. Golgi apparatus (or, Golgi body); 7. Cytoskeleton; 8. Smooth endoplasmic reticulum 9. Mitochondrion; 10. Vacuole; 11. Cytosol (fluid that contains organelles; with which, comprises cytoplasm); 12. Lysosome; 13. Centrosome; 14. Cell membrane

Some vesicles are made when part of the membrane pinches off the endoplasmic reticulum or the Golgi complex. Others are made when an object outside the cell is surrounded by the cell membrane.

=== Vesicle coat and cargo molecules ===
The vesicle "coat" is a collection of proteins that serve to shape the curvature of a donor membrane, forming the rounded vesicle shape. Coat proteins can also function to bind to various transmembrane receptor proteins, called cargo receptors. These receptors help select what material is endocytosed in receptor-mediated endocytosis or intracellular transport.

There are three types of vesicle coats: clathrin, COPI and COPII. The various types of coat proteins help with sorting of vesicles to their final destination. Clathrin coats are found on vesicles trafficking between the Golgi and plasma membrane, the Golgi and endosomes and the plasma membrane and endosomes. COPI coated vesicles are responsible for retrograde transport from the Golgi to the ER, while COPII coated vesicles are responsible for anterograde transport from the ER to the Golgi.

The clathrin coat is thought to assemble in response to regulatory G protein. A protein coat assembles and disassembles due to an ADP ribosylation factor (ARF) protein.

=== Vesicle docking ===
Surface proteins called SNAREs identify the vesicle's cargo and complementary SNAREs on the target membrane act to cause fusion of the vesicle and target membrane. Such v-SNARES are hypothesised to exist on the vesicle membrane, while the complementary ones on the target membrane are known as t-SNAREs.

Often SNAREs associated with vesicles or target membranes are instead classified as Qa, Qb, Qc, or R SNAREs owing to further variation than simply v- or t-SNAREs. An array of different SNARE complexes can be seen in different tissues and subcellular compartments, with 38 isoforms currently identified in humans. Regulatory Rab proteins are thought to inspect the joining of the SNAREs. Rab protein is a regulatory GTP-binding protein and controls the binding of these complementary SNAREs for a long enough time for the Rab protein to hydrolyse its bound GTP and lock the vesicle onto the membrane.

SNAREs proteins in plants are understudied compared to fungi and animals. The cell botanist Natasha Raikhel has done some of the basic research in this area, including Zheng et al 1999 in which she and her team found AtVTI1a to be essential to Golgi⇄vacuole transport.

=== Vesicle fusion ===
Vesicle fusion can occur in one of two ways: full fusion or kiss-and-run fusion. Fusion requires the two membranes to be brought within 1.5 nm of each other. For this to occur water must be displaced from the surface of the vesicle membrane. This is energetically unfavorable and evidence suggests that the process requires ATP, GTP and acetyl-coA. Fusion is also linked to budding, which is why the term budding and fusing arises.

=== In receptor downregulation ===
Membrane proteins serving as receptors are sometimes tagged for downregulation by the attachment of ubiquitin. After arriving an endosome via the pathway described above, vesicles begin to form inside the endosome, taking with them the membrane proteins meant for degradation; When the endosome either matures to become a lysosome or is united with one, the vesicles are completely degraded. Without this mechanism, only the extracellular part of the membrane proteins would reach the lumen of the lysosome and only this part would be degraded.

It is because of these vesicles that the endosome is sometimes known as a multivesicular body. The pathway to their formation is not completely understood; unlike the other vesicles described above, the outer surface of the vesicles is not in contact with the cytosol.

=== Preparation ===
==== Isolated vesicles ====
Producing membrane vesicles is one of the methods to investigate various membranes of the cell. After the living tissue is crushed into suspension, various membranes form tiny closed bubbles. Big fragments of the crushed cells can be discarded by low-speed centrifugation and later the fraction of the known origin (plasmalemma, tonoplast, etc.) can be isolated by precise high-speed centrifugation in the density gradient. Using osmotic shock, it is possible temporarily open vesicles (filling them with the required solution) and then centrifugate down again and resuspend in a different solution. Applying ionophores like valinomycin can create electrochemical gradients comparable to the gradients inside living cells.

Vesicles are mainly used in two types of research:

- To find and later isolate membrane receptors that specifically bind hormones and various other important substances.
- To investigate transport of various ions or other substances across the membrane of the given type. While transport can be more easily investigated with patch clamp techniques, vesicles can also be isolated from objects for which a patch clamp is not applicable.

=== Artificial vesicles ===
Artificial vesicles are classified into three groups based on their size: small unilamellar liposomes/vesicles (SUVs) with a size range of 20–100 nm, large unilamellar liposomes/vesicles (LUVs) with a size range of 100–1000 nm and giant unilamellar liposomes/vesicles (GUVs) with a size range of 1–200 μm. Smaller vesicles in the same size range as trafficking vesicles found in living cells are frequently used in biochemistry and related fields. For such studies, a homogeneous phospholipid vesicle suspension can be prepared by extrusion or sonication, or by rapid injection of a phospholipid solution into an aqueous buffer solution. In this way, aqueous vesicle solutions can be prepared of different phospholipid composition, as well as different sizes of vesicles. Larger synthetically made vesicles such as GUVs are used for in vitro studies in cell biology to mimic cell membranes. These vesicles are large enough to be studied using traditional fluorescence light microscopy. A variety of methods exist to encapsulate biological reactants like protein solutions within such vesicles, making GUVs an ideal system for the in vitro recreation (and investigation) of cell functions in cell-like model membrane environments. These methods include microfluidic methods, which allow for a high-yield production of vesicles with consistent sizes.

== See also ==
- Bleb (cell biology)
- Host–pathogen interaction
- Membrane contact sites
- Membrane nanotube
- Membrane vesicle trafficking
- Micelle
- Microsome
- Protocell
- Spitzenkörper, a structure of many small vesicles found in fungal hyphae
