= Traube cell =

Formation of Traube cells. Crystals of potassium ferrocyanide are put into a solution of copper sulfate (left). The interaction between them forms a film of copper ferrocyanide at the vessel wall (right). The film is slowly filled with water inside it, like a membrane of a plant cell.

A Traube cell is an "artificial cell" created by Moritz Traube in order to study the processes of living cells, including growth and osmosis. The Traube cell is not a true artificial cell, as it is not living and does not have true biological processes of its own.

== History ==
Mortiz Traube was a German student of the German chemist Justus von Liebig in the mid-19th century. In 1867, Traube developed the Traube cell from copper ferrocyanide, in order to study the properties of plasma membranes. The artificial cell would expand and bud like living cells. Surgeon and professor Wilhelm Pfeffer used this model to study and coin the term "plasma membrane".

== Structure ==
The Traube precipitation membrane consists of copper ferrocyanide and forms readily on a surface of crystal potassium ferrocyanide when the crystal is put into a dilute solution of copper sulfate. The membrane is semi-permeable, and expands rapidly into the Traube cell. Within the cell is a high concentration of potassium ferrocyanide with strong osmotic force. While it cannot diffuse outward, water and the copper sulfate solution can flow inwards. When the expansion caused the membrane to burst, a new membrane was quickly formed. In this way, the cell could "grow" and become several centimeters long. The ability of the Traube cell membrane to allow water to flow in while retaining the cell solute is comparable to living cells.
