= Chlaeniitae =

Former supertribe of beetles

Chlaeniitae was formerly a supertribe of the beetle subfamily Harpalinae. The taxon is no longer in common use, after a reorganization of the family Carabidae.
