= KSL cells =

Early form of hematopoietic stem cells

KSL cells in cell biology are an early form of mouse/murine hematopoietic stem cells. Characteristics are Kit (+), Sca-1 (+) and Lin (-). HSCs [Hematopoietic stem cells] in murine cultures show phenotypic markers as being CD34-, CD150+, and Flt3- for LTR [long-term reconstitution]. These phenotypic markers are used when purifying hematopoietic stem cells from the many other differentiated cells in the bone marrow.

Kit (CD117) is the receptor of Stem Cell Factor. Sca-1 is a murine hematopoietic stem cell antigen. Lin is a series of lineage marker antigens that identify mature murine blood cells.

Hematopoietic stem cells are of interest because of their ability to self-renew and differentiate into every types of blood cell. Transplantation of these cells in the bone marrow can be used to treat leukemia and other diseases of the blood and immune system. Murine/mouse cells lines are used as a model to research treatments before they are tested on humans.

== See also ==
- Cell biophysics
- Cell disruption
- Cell physiology
- Cellular adaptation
- Cellular microbiology
- Outline of cell biology

== Notes ==
- Rossi L, Challen GA, Sirin O, Lin KK, Goodell MA (2011). "Hematopoietic stem cell characterization and isolation". Stem Cell Migration. Methods Mol Biol. Vol. 750. pp. 47–59. doi:10.1007/978-1-61779-145-1_3. ISBN 978-1-61779-144-4. PMC 3621966. PMID 21618082.
- Doulatov S, Notta F, Eppert K, Nguyen LT, Ohashi PS, Dick JE (July 2010). "Revised map of the human progenitor hierarchy shows the origin of macrophages and dendritic cells in early lymphoid development". Nat Immunol. 11 (7): 585–93. doi:10.1038/ni.1889. PMID 20543838.
- Notta F, Doulatov S, Laurenti E, Poeppl A, Jurisica I, Dick JE (July 2011). "Isolation of single human hematopoietic stem cells capable of long-term multilineage engraftment". Science. 333 (6039): 218–21. Bibcode:2011Sci...333..218N. doi:10.1126/science.1201219. PMID 21737740.
- Sonoda Y (April 2021). "Human CD34-negative hematopoietic stem cells: The current understanding of their biological nature". Exp Hematol. 96: 13–26. doi:10.1016/j.exphem.2021.02.004. PMID 33610645. "Hematopoietic stem cell (HSC) heterogeneity and hierarchy are a current topic of interest, having major implications for clinical HSC transplantation and basic research on human HSCs. It was long believed that the most primitive HSCs in mammals, including mice and humans, were CD34 antigen positive (CD34+). However, 2 decades ago, it was reported that murine long-term multilineage reconstituting HSCs were lineage marker negative (Lin-, i.e., c-kit+Sca-1+CD34low/-), known as CD34low/- KSL cells. In contrast, human CD34- HSCs, a counterpart of murine CD34low/- KSL cells, were hard to identify for a long time mainly because of their rarity."
