= Stem cell chip =

Device that detects biochemical changes in stem cells

Stem cell chip is a device that detects given biochemical changes in stem cells, for example changes in RNA expression.

== See also ==
- Stem cell genomics
