= Kendall Van Keuren-Jensen =

American neurogenomics researcher

- Education: PhD Stony Brook University; MSc University of Kansas; BA Boston University
- Known for: Research on extracellular RNA; biomarkers in neurological diseases
- Awards: Outstanding Women in Business (2022)
- Scientific career
- Fields: Neurogenomics, extracellular RNA, neurodegenerative diseases
- Workplaces: Translational Genomics Research Institute; Center for Noninvasive Diagnostics

Kendall Van Keuren-Jensen is an American neurogenomics researcher known for her work in the field of extracellular RNA and its implications in neurological diseases.

She currently serves as the Vice President of Research and Professor in the Neurogenomics Division at the Translational Genomics Research Institute, where she also holds the position of director of the Center for Noninvasive Diagnostics.

== Education ==
Van Keuren-Jensen received her PhD from Stonybrook University at Cold Spring Harbor Laboratory in New York, where she studied the role of activity-regulated genes in synaptic transmission and neuronal morphology with Dr. Hollis Cline.

She also has a Master’s degree in pharmacology and toxicology from the University of Kansas, and she double majored in biology and anthropology at Boston University.

== Career ==
At Phoenix’s Tgen, Dr Van Keuren-Jensen’s lab examined dysregulated RNAs in neurodegenerative disease, including the RNA cargo of extracellular vesicles, using several sequencing platforms and a diverse set of bioinformatics tools for analysis.

In 2015, Van Keuren-Jensen was a principal investigator on a National Institutes of Health (NIH) grant awarded through the Extracellular RNA Communication Program to support research on methods for detecting and treating brain injury caused by intracerebral hemorrhage.

In 2021, Van Keuren-Jensen served as a co-investigator on a National Institutes of Health (NIH) R01 grant that supported research into the role of immune cells in amyotrophic lateral sclerosis (ALS) and frontotemporal dementia (FTD).

In 2022, Van Keuren-Jensen was a co-investigator on a National Institutes of Health (NIH) R21 grant supporting research into the use of stem cell models to differentiate subtypes of Lewy body dementia.

In 2024, she was appointed as a senior scientist and lead for the Neurogenomics and Diagnostics Unit at the National Institute on Aging's Center for Alzheimer's and Related Dementias (CARD). In January 2025, she was named the acting director,

However in March 2025, she was among several staff members terminated as she was still tagged as a probationary employee.

== Research ==
Keuren-Jensen's research includes investigation into chronic traumatic encephalopathy, CTE, where she headed a study to find out if biomarkers indicating CTE can be found in the blood, urine, or saliva of the living.

== Awards ==
- Outstanding Women in Business 2022: Phoenix Business Journal
- PLOS ONE Publication Recognition (2014): Her paper on potential RNA biomarkers for Alzheimer's disease was highlighted by the Translational Genomics Research Institute (TGen) for its impact.
