= Prostasomes =

Prostasomes are extracellular vesicles (40-500 nm in diameter) secreted by the prostate gland epithelial cells into seminal fluid. They possess an unusual lipid composition and a tight and highly ordered structure of their lipid bilayer membrane, resembling that of lipid raft domains. Prostasomes appear to improve sperm motility and protect against attacks from the female immune defense during the passage to the egg.

The name prostasomes was coined in the early 1980s by combining the terms "prosta"=prostate and "soma" (Greek for "body"). Around this time, the first functional studies of prostasomes were also performed.

Cancerous prostate cells and prostate cells with low differentiation continue to produce and secrete prostasomes. Possibly, the high incidence of prostate cancer in elderly men could be due to the immunomodulatory properties of prostasomes, protecting the cancer from attack by the immune system.

Fusion of prostasomes with the sperm plasma membrane is required for regulation of different aspects of sperm function, such as motility and capacitation. Prostasomes have also been implicated in the interaction between prostatic cancer cells and their microenvironment.

Immune regulating proteins found in prostasomes include: amino-peptidase N (CD13); dipeptidyl-peptidase IV (CD26); enkephalinase (neutral endopeptidase, CD10); angiotensin converting enzyme (ACE, CD143); tissue factor TF (CD142, thromboplastin); decay accelerating factor (CD55); protectin (CD59, inhibitor of MAC) and complement regulatory membrane cofactor protein (CD46). Prostasomes also contain high levels of the divalent cations: Zn^{2+}, Ca^{2+} and Mg^{2+}.

== Historical background of prostasome research ==
Year	
1977-78	An ATPase activity in seminal plasma indicated an occurrence of membrane-surrounded extracellular vesicles
1981	The first association between prostasomes and fertility was reported
1983	The first electron microscopic pictures of prostasomes inside storage vesicles (multivesicular bodies) in cytoplasm of prostate epithelial cells and their extracellular release into lumen of the prostate
1984	The role of prostasomes in infertility and prostate cancer was investigated
1986-89	Studies on ATPases on the prostasomal surface
1989	The prostasomal membrane was found to have a much higher cholesterol/phospholipid ratio than ordinary cellular membranes
1990	Nucleic acid was found to be associated with prostasomes. An interaction between prostasomes and sperm was shown
1991-94	Prostasomes and their role in immunosuppression were investigated in several articles. Granulophysin (CD63) was suggested as a marker for prostasomes
1995-2001	Monoclonal antibodies against prostasomes were produced and several studies involving these antibodies were performed as well as prostasome-sperm interaction studies. Prostasomes were discovered in prostatic fluid of other species. Prostatic cancer cell lines were found to produce prostasomes. Prostasomes displayed anti-bacterial activity
2001	Autoantibodies against prostasomes were evaluated as biomarkers for prostate cancer
2003	The first comprehensive shotgun proteomics of the prostasome proteome and it has been followed by two others
2005	Haemostasis coupled to prostasomes and the prostasomal membrane in fertility and in cancer
2009-	Investigation of prostasomal DNA. DNA was found in both non-malignant prostasomes as well as in prostate cancer (PC3) cell derived prostasomes/exosomes
2009-	Prostasomes as a serum biomarker of prostate cancer
2015	Lipid rafts purified from prostasome membranes

== See also ==
- Vesicles
- Membrane biophysics
- Lipidomics
- International Society for Extracellular Vesicles
- Journal of Extracellular Vesicles
