= Extracellular RNA =

RNA species present outside of the cells in which they were transcribed

Extracellular RNA (exRNA) describes RNA species present outside of the cells in which they were transcribed. Carried within extracellular vesicles, lipoproteins, and protein complexes, exRNAs are protected from ubiquitous RNA-degrading enzymes. exRNAs may be found in the environment or, in multicellular organisms, within the tissues or biological fluids such as venous blood, saliva, breast milk, urine, semen, menstrual blood, and vaginal fluid. Although their biological function is not fully understood, exRNAs have been proposed to play a role in a variety of biological processes including syntrophy, intercellular communication, and cell regulation.

The United States National Institutes of Health (NIH) published in 2012 a set of Requests for Applications (RFAs) for investigating extracellular RNA biology. Funded by the NIH Common Fund, the resulting program was collectively known as the Extracellular RNA Communication Consortium (ERCC). The ERCC was renewed for a second phase in 2019.

== Background ==
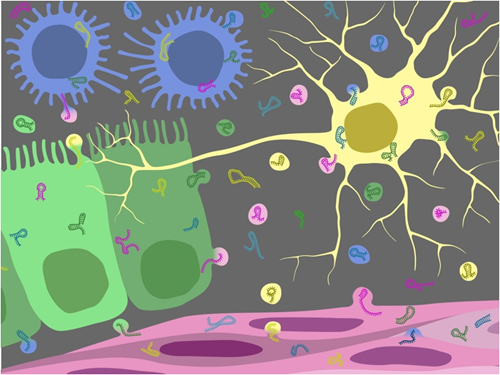
A cartoon representation of the environments in which extracellular RNAs have been discovered.

Both prokaryotic and eukaryotic cells are known to release RNA, and this release can be passive or active. The Endosomal Sorting Complex Required for Transport (ESCRT) machinery was previously considered as a possible mechanism for RNA secretion from the cell, but more recently, research studying microRNA secretion in human embryonic kidney cells and Cercopithecus aethiops kidney cells identified neutral sphingomyelinase 2 (nSMase2), an enzyme involved in ceramide biosynthesis, as a regulator of microRNA secretion levels. ExRNAs are often found packaged within vesicles such as exosomes, ectosomes, prostasomes, microvesicles, and apoptotic bodies. Although RNAs can be excreted from the cell without an enveloping container, ribonucleases (RNases) present in extracellular environments would eventually degrade the molecule.

=== Types ===
Extracellular RNA should not be viewed as a category describing a set of RNAs with a specific biological function or belonging to a particular RNA family. Similar to the term "non-coding RNA", "extracellular RNA" defines a group of several types of RNAs whose functions are diverse, yet they share a common attribute which, in the case of exRNAs, is existence in an extracellular environment. The following types of RNA have been found outside the cell:

- Messenger RNA (mRNA)
- Transfer RNA (tRNA)
- MicroRNA (miRNA)
- Small interfering RNA (siRNA)
- Long non-coding RNA (lncRNA)

Though prevalent inside of the cell, ribosomal RNA (rRNA) does not seem to be a common exRNA. Efforts by Valadi et al. to characterize exosomal RNA using the Agilent Bioanalyzer technology showed little to no trace of 18S and 28S rRNA in exosomes secreted by MC/9 murine mast cells, and similar conclusions were made by Skog et al. for rRNA in glioblastoma microvesicles.

=== Function ===
To function or even survive as full-length RNA in extracellular environments, exRNA must be protected from digestion by RNases. This requirement does not apply to prokaryotic syntrophy, where digested nucleotides are recycled. exRNA can be shielded from RNases by RNA binding proteins (RBPs), on their own or within/associated with lipoprotein particles and extracellular vesicles. Extracellular vesicles in particular are thought to be a way to transport RNA between cells, in a process that may be general or highly specific, for example, due to incorporation of markers of the parent cell that may be recognized by receptors on the recipient cell. Biochemical evidence supports the idea that exRNA uptake is a common process, suggesting new pathways for intercellular communication. As a result, the presence, absence, and relative abundance of certain exRNAs can be correlated with changes in cellular signaling and may indicate specific disease states.

Despite a limited understanding of exRNA biology, current research has shown the role of exRNAs to be multi-faceted. Extracellular miRNAs are capable of targeting mRNAs in the recipient cell through RNA interference pathways. In vitro experiments have shown the transfer of specific exRNAs into recipient cells inhibiting protein expression and preventing cancer cell growth. In addition to mRNAs being regulated by exRNAs, mRNAs can act as exRNAs to carry genetic information between cells. mRNA contained in microvesicles secreted from glioblastomal cells were shown to generate a functional protein in recipient (human brain microvascular endothelial) cells in vitro. In another study of extracellular mRNAs, mRNAs transported by microvesicles from endothelial progenitor cells (EPCs) to human microvascular and macrovascular endothelial cells triggered angiogenesis in both the in vitro and in vivo setting. Work by Hunter et al. used Ingenuity Pathway Analysis (IPA) software that associated exRNAs found in human blood microvesicles with pathways involved in blood cell differentiation, metabolism, and immune function. These experimental and bioinformatics analyses favor the hypothesis that exRNAs play a role in numerous biological processes. The idea that mammalian cells might communicate over long distances by secreting RNAs is exciting, yet definitive evidence supporting this mode of intercellular regulation remains elusive, leaving the hypothesis without definitive data.

== Detection ==
Several methods have been developed or adapted to detect, characterize, and quantify exRNA from biological samples. RT-PCR, cDNA microarrays, and RNA sequencing are common techniques for RNA analysis. Applying these methods to study exRNAs mainly differs from cellular RNA experiments in the RNA isolation and/or extraction steps.

=== RT-PCR ===
For known exRNA nucleotide sequences, RT-PCR can be applied to detect their presence within a sample as well as quantify their abundance. This is done through first reverse transcribing the RNA sequence into complementary DNA (cDNA). The cDNA then serves as a template for PCR amplification. The major benefits of using RT-PCR are its quantitative accuracy in a dynamic range and increased sensitivity compared to methods such as RNase protection assays and dot blot hybridization. The disadvantage to RT-PCR is the requirement of costly supplies, and the necessity of sound experimental design and an in-depth understanding of normalization techniques in order to obtain accurate results and conclusions.

=== Microfluidics ===
Microfluidic platforms such as the Agilent Bioanalyzer are useful in assessing the quality of exRNA samples. With the Agilent Bioanalyzer, a lab-on-chip technology that uses a sample of isolated RNA measures the length and quantity of RNA in the sample, and the results of the experiment can be represented as a digital electrophoresis gel image or an electropherogram. Because a diverse range of RNAs can be detected by this technology, it is an effective method for more generally determining what types of RNAs are present in exRNAs samples through using size characterization.

=== cDNA microarrays ===
Microarrays allow for larger-scale exRNA characterization and quantification. Microarrays used for RNA studies first generate different cDNA oligonucleotides (probes) that are attached to the microarray chip. An RNA sample can then be added to the chip, and RNAs with sequence complementarity to the cDNA probe will bind and generate a fluorescent signal that can be quantified. Micro RNA arrays have been used in exRNA studies to generate miRNA profiles of bodily fluids.

=== RNA sequencing ===
The advent of massively parallel sequencing (next-generation sequencing) lead to variations in DNA sequencing that allowed for high-throughput analyses of many genomic properties. Among these DNA sequencing-derived methods is RNA sequencing. The main advantage of RNA sequencing over other methods for exRNA detection and quantification is its high-throughput capabilities. Unlike microarrays, RNA sequencing is not constrained by factors such as oligonucleotide generation, and the number of probes that can be added to a chip. Indirect RNA sequencing of exRNA samples involves generating a cDNA library from the exRNAs followed by PCR amplification and sequencing. In 2009, Helicos Biosciences published a method for directly sequencing RNA molecules called Direct RNA sequencing (DRS™). Regardless of the RNA sequencing platform, inherent biases exist at various steps in the experiment, but methods have been proposed to correct for these biases with promising results.

== Clinical significance ==
As growing evidence supports the function of exRNAs as intercellular communicators, research efforts are investigating the possibility of utilizing exRNAs in disease diagnosis, prognosis, and therapeutics.

=== Biomarkers ===
The potential of extracellular RNAs to serve as biomarkers is significant not only because of their role in intercellular signaling but also due to developments in next generation sequencing that enable high throughput profiling. The simplest form of an exRNA biomarker is the presence (or absence) of a specific extracellular RNA. These biological signatures have been discovered in exRNA studies of cancer, diabetes, arthritis, and prion-related diseases. Recently, a bioinformatics analysis of extracellular vesicles extracted from Trypanosoma cruzi, in which SNPs were mined from transcriptomic data, suggested that exRNAs could be biomarkers of neglected diseases such as Chagas disease.

==== Cancer ====
A major research area of interest for exRNA has been its role in cancer. The table below (adapted from Kosaka et al.) lists several types of cancer in which exRNAs have been shown to be associated:

Type	ExRNA Biomarker Candidate
Diffuse large B-cell lymphoma (DLBCL)	Expression levels of miR-155, miR-210 and miR-21 were higher in DLBCL patient sera compared to control sera; High miR-21 expression was associated with relapse-free survival
Prostate cancer	Serum levels of miR-141 can distinguish patients with prostate cancer from healthy controls
Ovarian cancer	The levels of the 8 specific miRNAs were similar between cellular and exosomal miRNAs. Exosomal miRNA from ovarian cancer patients exhibited similar profiles, which were significantly distinct from profiles observed in benign disease; miR-21, miR-92, miR-93, miR-126 and miR-29a were significantly overexpressed in the serum from cancer patients compared to controls
Non small cell lung cancer	Eleven serum miRNAs were found to be altered more than 5-fold between longer-survival and shorter-survival groups, and levels of four miRNAs were significantly associated with overall survival
Acute myeloid leukemia and acute lymphoblastic leukemia	miR-92a decreased in the plasmas of acute leukemia patients
Breast cancer	Increased miR-195 levels in patients were reflected in tumors, and circulating levels of miR-195 and let-7a decreased in cancer patients postoperatively, to levels comparable with control subjects; miR-155 was differentially expressed in the serum of women with hormone-sensitive compared to women with hormone-insensitive breast cancer
Gastric cancer	The plasma concentrations of miR-17-5p, miR-21, miR-106a, and miR-106b were significantly higher in patients than controls, whereas let-7a was lower in patients
Pancreatic cancer	Circulating miR-210 levels are elevated in pancreatic cancer patients
Pancreatic ductal adenocarcinoma	The combined analyses of four miRNAs (miR-21, miR-210, miR-155, and miR-196a) in plasma can discriminate patients from normal healthy individuals
Squamous cell carcinoma (SCC) of tongue	Plasma miR-184 levels were significantly higher in tongue SCC patients in comparison with normal individuals, and the levels were significantly reduced after surgical removal of the primary tumors
Colorectal cancer	Both miR-17-3p and miR-92 were significantly elevated in the patients, and the plasma levels of these miRNAs were reduced after surgery
Hepatocellular carcinoma (HCC)	An increased amount of miR-500 was found in the sera of the HCC patients, and its levels in sera returned to normal after the surgical treatment

== See also ==
- Environmental DNA
- non-coding RNA
- International Society for Extracellular Vesicles
- Journal of Extracellular Vesicles
