= Clotilde Théry =

French cell biologist

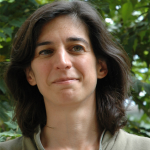
- Théry in 2017
- Education: College de France, Paris (PhD, 1991); Oxford University, United Kingdom; Columbia University, New York; Institut Curie, France
- Known for: Research on the immunology of extracellular vesicles; President, International Society for Extracellular Vesicles
- Awards: International Society for Extracellular Vesicles Special Achievement Award (2014)
- Scientific career
- Fields: Cellular biology, molecular biology, immunology
- Institutions: Institut Curie
- Academic advisors: S. Amigorena
- Website: science.institut-curie.org/ Théry Lab

Clotilde Théry is a professor and INSERM director of research (DR2) at Institut Curie in Paris, France. She is president of the International Society for Extracellular Vesicles (ISEV), where she previously served as founding secretary general and as editor-in-chief of the Journal of Extracellular Vesicles. She is the team leader of the group "Extracellular Vesicles, Immune Responses and Cancer" within the INSERM Unit 932 focusing on "Immunity and Cancer." Théry researches extracellular vesicles that are released by immune and tumor cells, including exosomes that originate in the multivesicular body.

== Career ==
After earning a PhD in France, Théry completed her first post-doctoral fellowship in the United Kingdom and the United States, focusing on the developmental biology of the nervous system. Upon returning to France, Théry took up the topic of cell biology of immune responses at Institut Curie.

Théry began studying exosomes in 1998, at a time when extracellular vesicles (EVs) were largely regarded as unimportant or even artifacts. In 2007, Théry's current team on Extracellular Vesicles, Immune responses and Cancer was started at Institut Curie, which is now a member of the PSL Research University.

== Research ==
Théry's lab focuses on understanding how EVs, including exosomes, facilitate communication between cells of the immune system and cancer cells. She is the most cited author of several cell biology journals, including Annual Review of Cell and Developmental Biology, Current protocols in cell biology, and the Journal of Extracellular Vesicles.

== Leadership and awards ==
- 2011 Théry co-organized the first "International Workshop on Exosomes" at Institut Curie, in Paris, France. This meeting led to the creation of the International Society for Extracellular Vesicles (ISEV).
- 2012–2016 Secretary general, ISEV
- 2012–2019 Editor-in-chief of the Journal of Extracellular Vesicles (with Yong Song Gho and Peter Quesenberry)
- 2014 ISEV Special Achievement Award
- 2018 Théry and Kenneth Witwer co-coordinated the Minimal Information for Studies of EVs (MISEV2018), a position and consensus statement of ISEV
- 2019 Curie-NCI Award (with Jennifer Jones of National Cancer Institute)
- 2020- President, ISEV
