= Jan Lötvall =

Swedish clinical allergist and scientist

Jan Lötvall (also spelled Lotvall) is a Swedish clinical allergist and scientist working on translational research primarily in the field of asthma and Extracellular Vesicles He is the former director of the Krefting Research Centre at the University of Gothenburg and is the Scientific Founder of Exocure Sweden AB

Lötvall's laboratory proposed extracellular vesicles such as exosomes and microvesicles as shuttles of RNA molecules between cells along with several other groups in 2006, 2007, and 2008.

Lötvall was a member of the Executive Committee of the European Academy of Allergy and Clinical Immunology, its secretary general from 2005 to 2009, and its president from June 2009 to June 2011. Lötvall was also co-editor-in-chief of Respiratory Research from 2003 to 2018. He was the first president of the International Society for Extracellular Vesicles (2012–2016) and chaired the first society meeting in Gothenburg, in April 2012. Lötvall became Editor-in-Chief of Journal of Extracellular Vesicles in 2019, and retired from that role in April 2025.

Lötvall studied medicine at the Karolinska Institutet in Stockholm (1981–1985) and graduated from the Medical School of the University of Gothenburg in 1987. He became interested in asthma research in the mid-1980s. After studying as a visiting fellow at the National Heart and Lung Institute, London from 1988 to 1990), Lötvall defended his thesis in February, 1991. He trained in both pharmacology and allergology, and became a specialist in these areas in 1997 and 1999, respectively. He became associate professor (docent) at the University of Gothenburg in 1993 and full professor of clinical allergology in 2002.
