= Witwer =

Witwer is a surname. Notable people with the surname include:

- Angela Witwer, American politician
- H. C. Witwer (1890–1929), American short-story author
- Kenneth Witwer, American biologist
- Rob Witwer (born 1971), American politician and lawyer
- Sam Witwer (born 1977), American actor, voice actor, and musician
