= Endurance =

Ability of an organism to exert itself and remain active for a long period of time

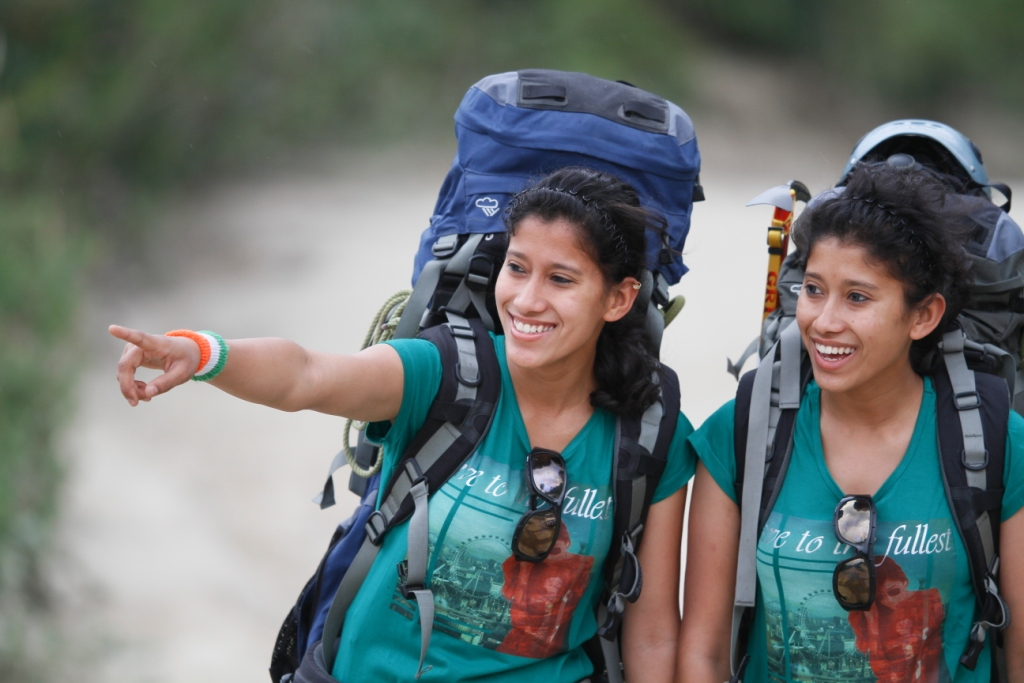
Twins Tashi and Nungshi Malik on an endurance trek at the foothills of the Himalayas

Endurance (also related to sufferance, forbearance, resilience, constitution, fortitude, persistence, tenacity, steadfastness, perseverance, stamina, hardiness and patience) is the ability of an organism to exert itself and remain active for a long period of time, as well as its ability to resist, withstand, recover from and have immunity to trauma, wounds, or fatigue.

The term is often used in the context of aerobic or anaerobic exercise. The definition of "long" varies according to the type of exertion – minutes for high intensity anaerobic exercise, hours or days for low intensity aerobic exercise. Training for endurance can reduce endurance strength unless an individual also undertakes resistance training to counteract this effect.

When a person is able to accomplish or withstand more effort than previously, their endurance is increasing. To improve their endurance they may slowly increase the amount of repetitions or time spent; in some exercises, more repetitions taken rapidly improve muscle strength but have less effect on endurance. Increasing endurance has been proven to release endorphins resulting in a positive mind. The act of gaining endurance through physical activity decreases anxiety, depression, and stress, or any chronic disease. Although a greater endurance can assist the cardiovascular system this does not imply that endurance is guaranteed to improve any cardiovascular disease. "The major metabolic consequences of the adaptations of muscle to endurance exercise are a slower utilization of muscle glycogen and blood glucose, a greater reliance on fat oxidation, and less lactate production during exercise of a given intensity."

The term stamina is sometimes used synonymously and interchangeably with endurance. Endurance may also refer to an ability to persevere through a difficult situation, to "endure hardship".

In military settings, endurance is the ability of a force to sustain high levels of combat potential relative to its opponent over the duration of a campaign.

== Philosophy ==
Aristotle noted similarities between endurance and self control: To have self control is to resist the temptation of things that seem immediately appealing, while to endure is to resist the discouragement of things that seem immediately uncomfortable.

== Endurance training ==
Different types of endurance performance can be trained in specific ways. Adaptation of exercise plans should follow individual goals.

Calculating the intensity of exercise the individual capabilities should be considered. Effective training starts within half the individual performance capability. Performance capability is expressed by maximum heart rate. Best results can be achieved in the range between 55% and 65% of maximum heart rate. Aerobic, anaerobic and further thresholds are not to be mentioned within extensive endurance exercises. Training intensity is measured via the heart rate.

=== Endurance-trained effects are mediated by epigenetic mechanisms ===
Between 2012 and 2019 at least 25 reports indicated a major role of epigenetic mechanisms in skeletal muscle responses to exercise.

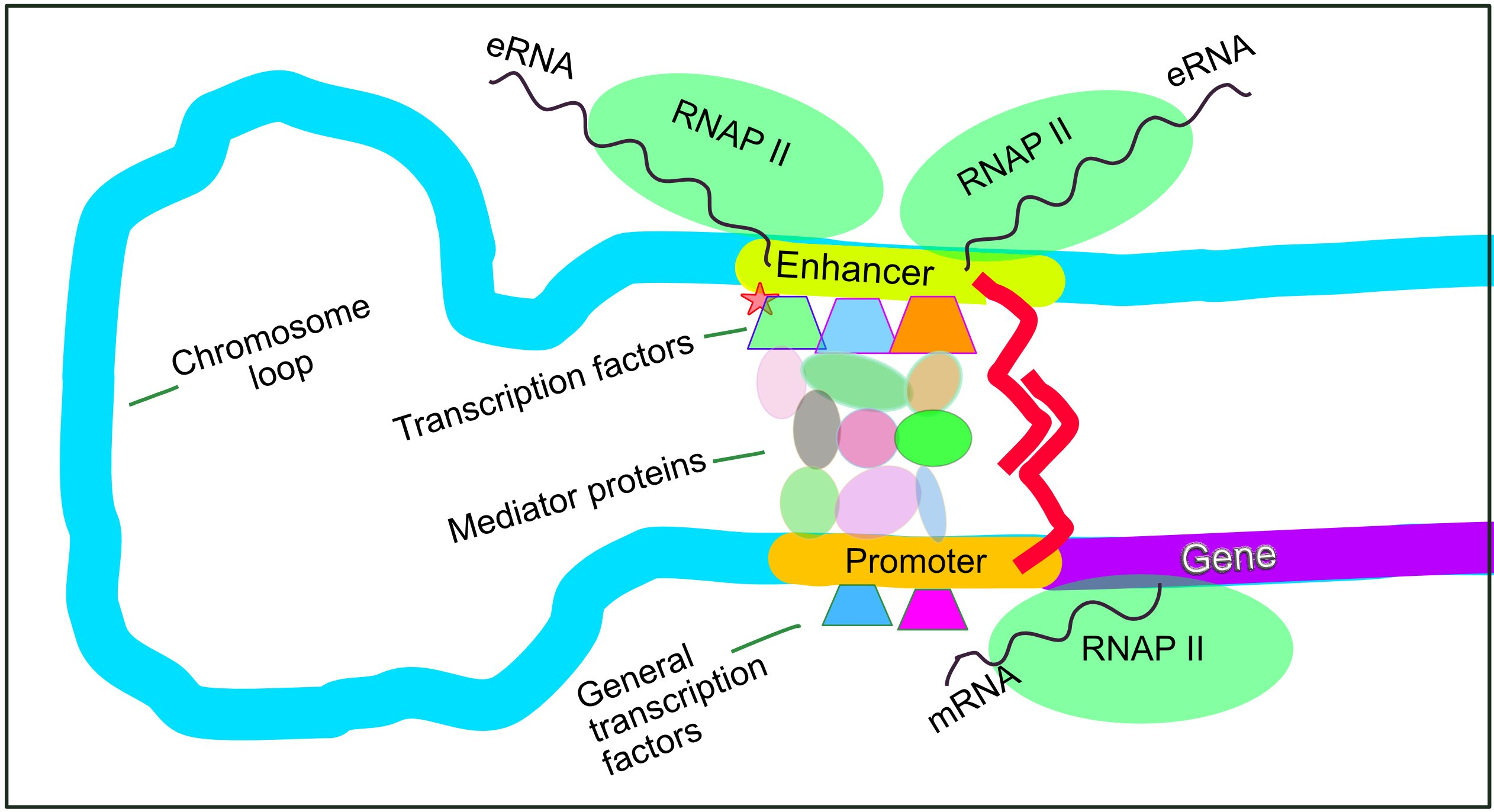
Regulation of transcription in mammals An active enhancer regulatory region is enabled to interact with the promoter region of its target gene by formation of a chromosome loop. This can allow initiation of messenger RNA (mRNA) synthesis by RNA polymerase II (RNAP II) bound to the promoter at the transcription start site of the gene. The loop is stabilized by one architectural protein anchored to the enhancer and one anchored to the promoter, and these proteins are joined together to form a dimer (red zigzags). Specific regulatory transcription factors bind to DNA sequence motifs on the enhancer. General transcription factors bind to the promoter. When a transcription factor is activated by a signal (here indicated as phosphorylation shown by a small red star on a transcription factor on the enhancer) the enhancer is activated and can now activate its target promoter. The active enhancer is transcribed on each strand of DNA in opposite directions by bound RNAP IIs. Mediator (a complex consisting of about 26 proteins in an interacting structure) communicates regulatory signals from the enhancer DNA-bound transcription factors to the promoter.

Gene expression in muscle is largely regulated, as in tissues generally, by regulatory DNA sequences, especially enhancers. Enhancers are non-coding sequences in the genome that activate the expression of distant target genes, by looping around and interacting with the promoters of their target genes (see Figure "Regulation of transcription in mammals"). As reported by Williams et al., the average distance in the loop between the connected enhancers and promoters of genes is 239,000 nucleotide bases.

==== Endurance exercise-induced long-term alteration of gene expression by histone acetylation or deacetylation ====
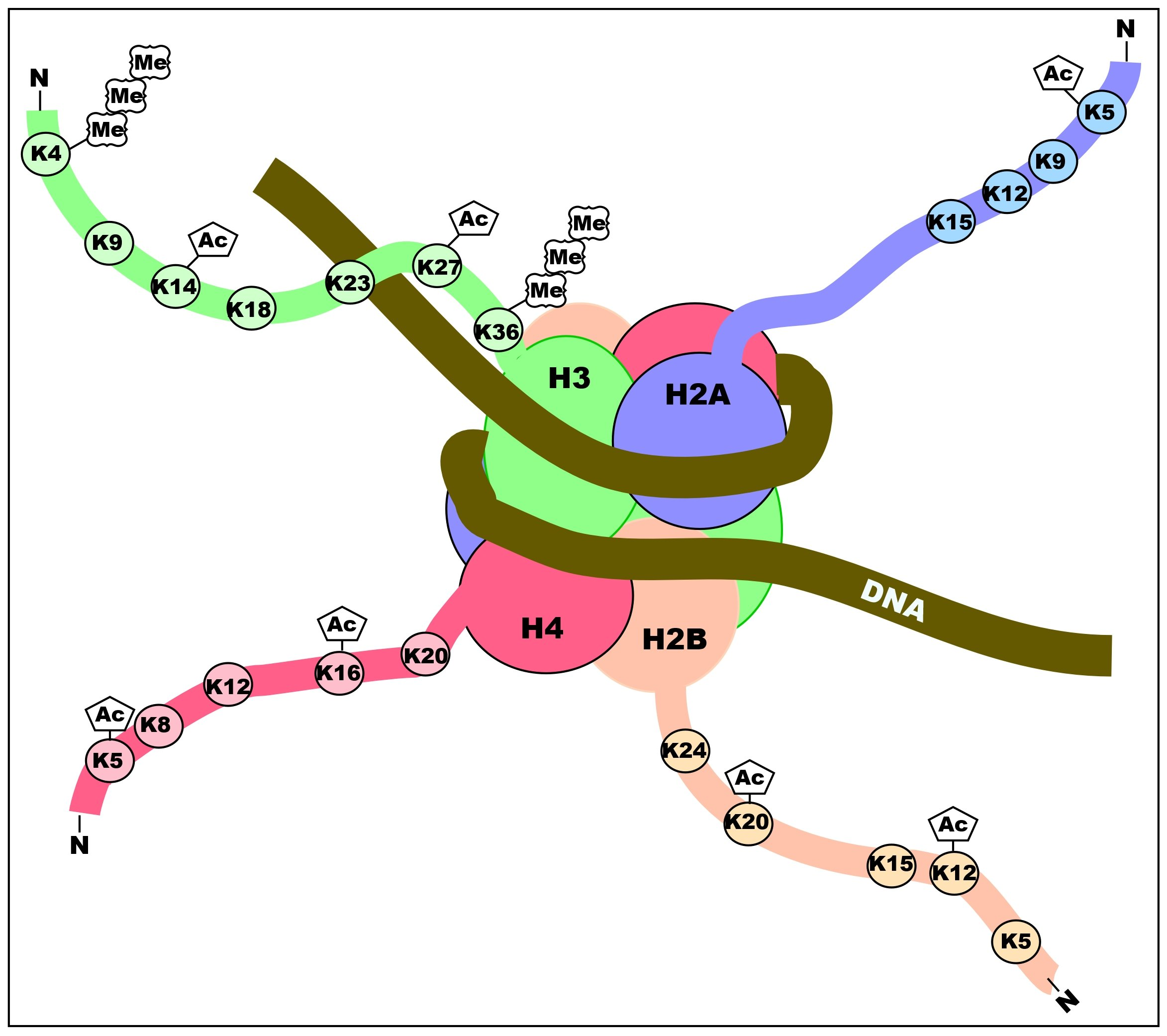
A nucleosome with histone tails set for transcriptional activation DNA in the nucleus generally consists of segments of 146 base pairs of DNA wrapped around nucleosomes connected to adjacent nucleosomes by linker DNA. Nucleosomes consist of four pairs of histone proteins in a tightly assembled core region plus up to 30% of each histone remaining in a loosely organized polypeptide tail (only one tail of each pair is shown). The pairs of histones, H2A, H2B, H3 and H4, each have lysines (K) in their tails, some of which are subject to post-translational modifications consisting, usually, of acetylations [Ac] and methylations {me}. The lysines (K) are designated with a number showing their position as, for instance, (K4), indicating lysine as the 4th amino acid from the amino (N) end of the tail in the histone protein. The particular acetylations [Ac] and methylations {Me} shown are those that occur on nucleosomes close to, or at, some DNA regions undergoing transcriptional activation of the DNA wrapped around the nucleosome.

After exercise, epigenetic alterations to enhancers alter long-term expression of hundreds of muscle genes. This includes genes producing proteins and other products secreted into the systemic circulation, many of which may act as endocrine messengers. Of 817 genes with altered expression, 157 (according to Uniprot) or 392 (according to Exocarta) of the proteins produced according to those genes were known to be secreted from the muscles. Four days after an endurance type of exercise, many genes have persistently altered epigenetically regulated expression. Four pathways altered were in the platelet/coagulation system, the cognitive system, the cardiovascular system, and the renal system. Epigenetic regulation of these genes was indicated by epigenetic alterations in the distant upstream DNA regulatory sequences of the enhancers of these genes.

Up-regulated genes had epigenetic acetylations added at histone 3 lysine 27 (H3k27ac) of nucleosomes located at the enhancers controlling those up-regulated genes, while down-regulated genes had epigenetic acetylations removed from H3K27 in nucleosomes located at the enhancers that control those genes (see Figure "A nucleosome with histone tails set for transcriptional activation"). Biopsies of the vastus lateralis muscle showed expression of 13,108 genes at baseline before an exercise training program. Six sedentary 23-year-old Caucasian males provided vastus lateralis biopsies before entering an exercise program (six weeks of 60-minute sessions of riding a stationary cycle, five days per week). Four days after the exercise program was completed, biopsies of the same muscles had altered gene expression, with 641 genes up-regulated and 176 genes down-regulated. Williams et al. identified 599 enhancer-gene interactions, covering 491 enhancers and 268 genes, where both the enhancer and the connected target gene were coordinately either upregulated or downregulated after exercise training.

==== Endurance exercise-induced alteration to gene expression by DNA methylation or demethylation ====
Endurance muscle training also alters muscle gene expression through epigenetic DNA methylation or de-methylation of CpG sites within enhancers. In a study by Lindholm et al., twenty-three 27-year-old, sedentary, male and female volunteers had endurance training on only one leg during three months. The other leg was used as an untrained control leg. Skeletal muscle biopsies from the vastus lateralis were taken both before training began and 24 hours after the last training session from each of the legs. The endurance-trained leg, compared to the untrained leg, had significant DNA methylation changes at 4,919 sites across the genome. The sites of altered DNA methylation were predominantly in enhancers. Transcriptional analysis, using RNA sequencing, identified 4,076 differentially expressed genes.

The transcriptionally upregulated genes were associated with enhancers that had a significant decrease in DNA methylation, while transcriptionally downregulated genes were associated with enhancers that had increased DNA methylation. In this study, the differentially methylated positions in enhancers with increased methylation were mainly associated with genes involved in structural remodeling of the muscle and glucose metabolism. The differentially decreased methylated positions in enhancers were associated with genes functioning in inflammatory/immunological processes and transcriptional regulation.

== See also ==
- Exercise
