= Cytotherapy =

Cytotherapy may refer to:

- Cell therapy, the process of introducing new cells into a tissue in order to treat a disease
- Cytotherapy (journal), a medical journal, the official journal of the International Society for Cellular Therapy
