= Kenneth Witwer =

American biologist

Kenneth W. Witwer
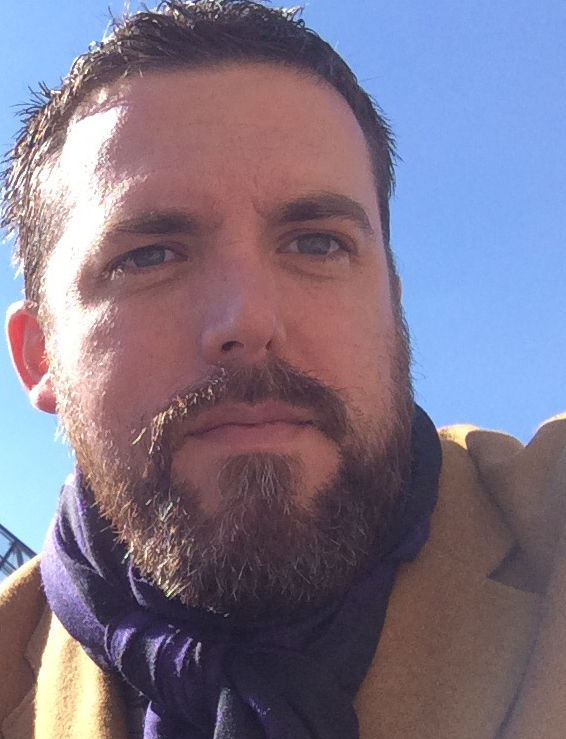
- Education: Johns Hopkins University, Baltimore, Maryland, United States (PhD)
- Known for: Research on extracellular vesicles and extracellular RNA
- Scientific career
- Fields: Virology; Molecular biology Nanomedicine; Nanotechnology
- Institutions: Johns Hopkins University
- Doctoral advisor: Janice E. Clements
- Website: witwerlab.com

Kenneth W. Witwer is an associate professor of molecular and comparative pathobiology and neurology at the Johns Hopkins University School of Medicine in Baltimore, Maryland, United States. He is president of the International Society for Extracellular Vesicles (ISEV) and previously served as Secretary General and Executive Chair of Science and Meetings of the society. His laboratory studies extracellular vesicles (EVs), noncoding and extracellular RNA (exRNA), and enveloped viruses, including HIV and SARS-CoV-2. Witwer is the managing editor of the journal Cytotherapy and a member of the Richman Family Precision Medicine Center of Excellence in Alzheimer's Disease. He has advised the US Environmental Protection Agency and the US National Institutes of Health and is an associate editor of the Journal of Extracellular Vesicles.

== Career and research ==
Witwer's PhD dissertation research was on retroviruses and innate immune system responses to pathogens such as Visna virus and simian immunodeficiency virus (SIV) as models of human immunodeficiency virus (HIV) disease, specifically regulation of microRNAs, cytokines, and the promyelocytic leukemia protein (TRIM19). He then completed a postdoctoral research project on miRNAs as biomarkers of HIV disease. In 2011, Witwer joined the faculty at Johns Hopkins, and he assumed a tenure-track position in 2012. His primary appointment is in the Department of Molecular and Comparative Pathobiology. He has a secondary appointment in Neurology and Neurosurgery. He is a member of the Cellular and Molecular Medicine program and the Richman Family Precision Medicine Center of Excellence in Alzheimer's Disease at Johns Hopkins.

The Witwer laboratory studies the roles of EVs, exRNA, and ncRNA in HIV disease of the central nervous system and in other neurodegenerative diseases, such as Alzheimer's and Parkinson's. Another focus of the group is on how inflammatory insults like cigarette smoking affect progression of disease. Beginning in 2013, Witwer examined the hypothesis that RNAs such as miRNAs in dietary substances could regulate endogenous genes in mammals. These studies led him and others to the conclusion that this type of regulation is unlikely to occur in normal physiology. He subsequently served on two Scientific Advisory Panels of the United States Environmental Protection Agency and addressed the European Food Safety Authority on related questions of environmental exposure to RNA.

== Organization and editing ==
Witwer chaired the organizing committee of the ISEV2015 annual meeting (Bethesda, United States). He has since filled several leadership roles with ISEV and become President of the society in 2024. Witwer has organized or co-organized workshops and other meetings on five continents. Responding in 2020 to the restrictions of the COVID-19 pandemic, Witwer converted a monthly journal club at Johns Hopkins into a weekly worldwide virtual event known as "Extracellular Vesicle Club." The club became an official ISEV feature in 2021. He is co-Chair with Paul Robbins of the 2022 Gordon Research Conference on EVs. Witwer is an associate editor of the Journal of Extracellular Vesicles and a member of the editorial boards of Clinical Chemistry and AIDS. He was instrumental in the founding of a second ISEV journal, the Journal of Extracellular Biology.

== Scientific rigor, standardization, and advocacy ==
Witwer has contributed to scientific standardization and rigor efforts. He was corresponding author in 2013 of the first position paper of the International Society for Extracellular Vesicles, on standardization of isolation and characterization of EVs in RNA studies. With Clotilde Théry, he coordinated the Minimal Information for Studies of Extracellular Vesicles (MISEV2018), a consensus guidelines document for the EV field. An opponent of AIDS denialism, a largely defunct movement that denied the existence of HIV or its role in causing AIDS, he has encouraged high standards in scientific publishing, critiquing predatory publishing and other publishing practices. He has advocated public availability of scientific data. With the emergence of COVID-19, Witwer was interviewed about the virology of the pandemic and conspiracy theories that arose around SARS-CoV-2. He is co-corresponding author of a statement by ISEV and the International Society for Gene and Cell Therapy on extracellular vesicle-based therapies for COVID-19.

== Awards and honors ==
- 2003-2006 National Science Foundation Graduate Research Fellowship
- 2009 Richard T. Johnson Award, International Society for NeuroVirology
- 2014 CFAR Scholar Award, Johns Hopkins University Center for AIDS Research
- 2017 Catalyst Award, Johns Hopkins University
- 2021 Special Achievement Award of the International Society for Extracellular Vesicles

== Selected works ==
- Witwer KW, Sarbanes SL, Liu J, Clements JE (2011). "A plasma microRNA signature of acute lentiviral infection: biomarkers of central nervous system disease". AIDS. 13 (25): 2057–67. doi:10.1097/QAD.0b013e32834b95bf. PMC 3703743. PMID 21857495.
- Witwer KW, Watson AK, Blankson JN, Clements JE (2012). "Relationships of PBMC microRNA expression, plasma viral load, and CD4+ T-cell count in HIV-1-infected elite suppressors and viremic patients". Retrovirology. 9 5. doi:10.1186/1742-4690-9-5. PMC 3292811. PMID 22240256.
- Witwer KW, Buzás EI, Bemis LT, Bora A, Lässer C, Lötvall J, Nolte-'t Hoen EN, Piper MG, Sivaraman S, Skog J, Théry C, Wauben MH, Hochberg F (2013). "Standardization of sample collection, isolation and analysis methods in extracellular vesicle research". J. Extracell. Vesicles. 2 20360. doi:10.3402/jev.v2i0.20360. PMC 3760646. PMID 24009894.
- Théry C, Witwer KW, Aikawa E, et al. (2018). "Minimal information for studies of extracellular vesicles 2018 (MISEV2018): a position statement of the International Society for Extracellular Vesicles and update of the MISEV2014 guidelines". J. Extracell. Vesicles. 7 (1) 1535750. doi:10.1080/20013078.2018.1535750. PMC 6322352. PMID 30637094.
- Witwer KW, Théry C (2019). "Extracellular vesicles or exosomes? On primacy, precision, and popularity influencing a choice of nomenclature". J. Extracell. Vesicles. 8 (1) 1648167. doi:10.1080/20013078.2019.1648167. PMC 6711079. PMID 31489144.
- Arab T, Mallick ER, Huang Y, Dong L, Liao Z, Zhao Z, Gololobova O, Smith B, Haughey NJ, Pienta KJ, Slusher BS, Tarwater PM, Tosar JP, Zivkovic AM, Vreeland WN, Paulaitis ME, Witwer KW (2021). "Characterization of extracellular vesicles and synthetic nanoparticles with four orthogonal single-particle analysis platforms". J. Extracell. Vesicles. 10 (6) e12079. doi:10.1002/jev2.12079. PMC 8023330. PMID 33850608.
