= Rose Johnstone =

Canadian biochemist

Rose Mamelak Johnstone FRSC (14 May 1928 – 3 July 2009) was a Canadian biochemist who is known for her discovery of exosomes, the cellular structures that transport proteins, lipids and RNA. She was the first woman to hold the Gilman Cheney Chair in Biochemistry (1985) and the first and only woman chair of the Department of Biochemistry in McGill University's Faculty of Medicine (1980-1990).

Johnstone was a pioneer for women in science and an advocate for gender equality. She enrolled in biochemistry at a time when women were rarely accepted into it and went on to complete a BSc degree with first class honours and a PhD. As a professor at McGill University, she served on the Committee on the Status of Women, which resulted in recommended actions to end sexual discrimination and the improvement of working conditions for women in science and academia. She is a Fellow of the Royal Society of Canada.

== Early life ==
Rose Johnstone (née Mamelak) was the second of four siblings born to Jacob Mamelak and Esther Rotholz, a Jewish family who emigrated from Poland to Montreal, Canada in 1936. Rose's mother encouraged her to apply for a scholarship, which allowed Rose to attend high school despite her family's poverty. She worked as a nurses' aide at the Montreal Neurological Institute during the summers and planned to pursue a career as a technical assistant. However, she was drawn to research and enrolled at McGill University, studying microbiology.

Rose then changed to biochemistry. She completed her undergraduate BSc degree with first-class honours in 1950. She was able to support herself by securing a series of scholarships. She obtained her PhD in 1953 under the supervision of Juda Hirsch Quastel at the McGill-Montreal General Hospital Research Institute. She completed post-doctoral training in the United Kingdom at the National Institute of Medical Research in Mill Hill, the Chester Beatty Research Institute in London and the Strangeways Research Laboratory in Cambridge, with a fellowship from the National Cancer Institute of Canada.

== Career ==
Rose Johnstone was recruited to McGill's Department of Biochemistry in 1961. During her career, Johnstone authored 132 peer-reviewed publications and her work has been cited over 4,600 times.

Throughout her career, Johnstone was concerned about sexism in academia. In the 1970s, she helped improve working conditions for women in science and academia through her service on the Committee on the Status of Women at McGill. Reporting to the university's senate, the committee recommended actions to end sexual discrimination, most of which were implemented. At McGill University, Rose was the first woman to hold the Gilman Cheney Chair in Biochemistry and the first and only woman chair of the Department of Biochemistry in McGill's Faculty of Medicine.

Johnstone served as the president of the Montreal Physiological Society (1978–79) and the Canadian Biochemical Society (1985–86). She was secretary treasurer of the International Association for Women Bioscientists (1985–88) as well.

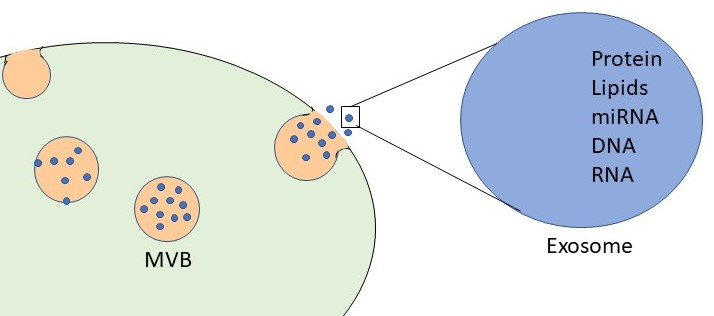
Exosomes

She retired as professor emerita in 1995.

== Discovery of exosomes ==
Exosomes are a type of extracellular vesicle responsible for the secretion of cell constituents (protein, DNA, and RNA) that can be taken up by other cells. This form of intracellular communication through exosomes can affect cell function and behaviour. It is through this mechanism that exosomes are involved in the development of various disorders, including cancer, neurodegeneration, and inflammatory diseases.

Johnstone discovered exosomes through her work with red blood cells and iron uptake. While studying how iron enters maturing red blood cells, she discovered that only precursor reticulocytes could bind to iron. Her research showed that an iron-binding protein was absent from the surface of mature red blood cells and identified a new vesicle structure that allowed the iron-binding proteins to leave reticulocytes, enabling the maturation of red blood cells. She named this structure the "exosome." In this work she revealed a new pathway through which cells secrete exosomes. Exosomes play a role in cell communication in the immune system, the brain, and the heart.

== Personal life ==
Rose was married to Douglas Johnstone, with whom she mothered her sons Michael and Eric.

== Legacy ==
Rose Johnstone made significant contributions to the fields of biochemistry, medicine, and cell biology. She was an advocate for equality in science and academia.

Following her death, her son Michael, a cardiologist, established the Rose Mamelak Johnstone Research Bursary to support women researchers in McGill's Department of Biochemistry.

== Awards ==
- Fellow, National Cancer Institute of Canada (1954–58)
- Moyse Travelling Scholarship, Faculty of Science, McGill University (1954)
- Queen Elizabeth II Jubilee Silver Medal (1978)
- Fellow, Royal Society of Canada (1987)
- CSMB Jeanne Manery Fisher Memorial Lecture, Canadian Society for Molecular Biosciences (1991)
