= Exopher =

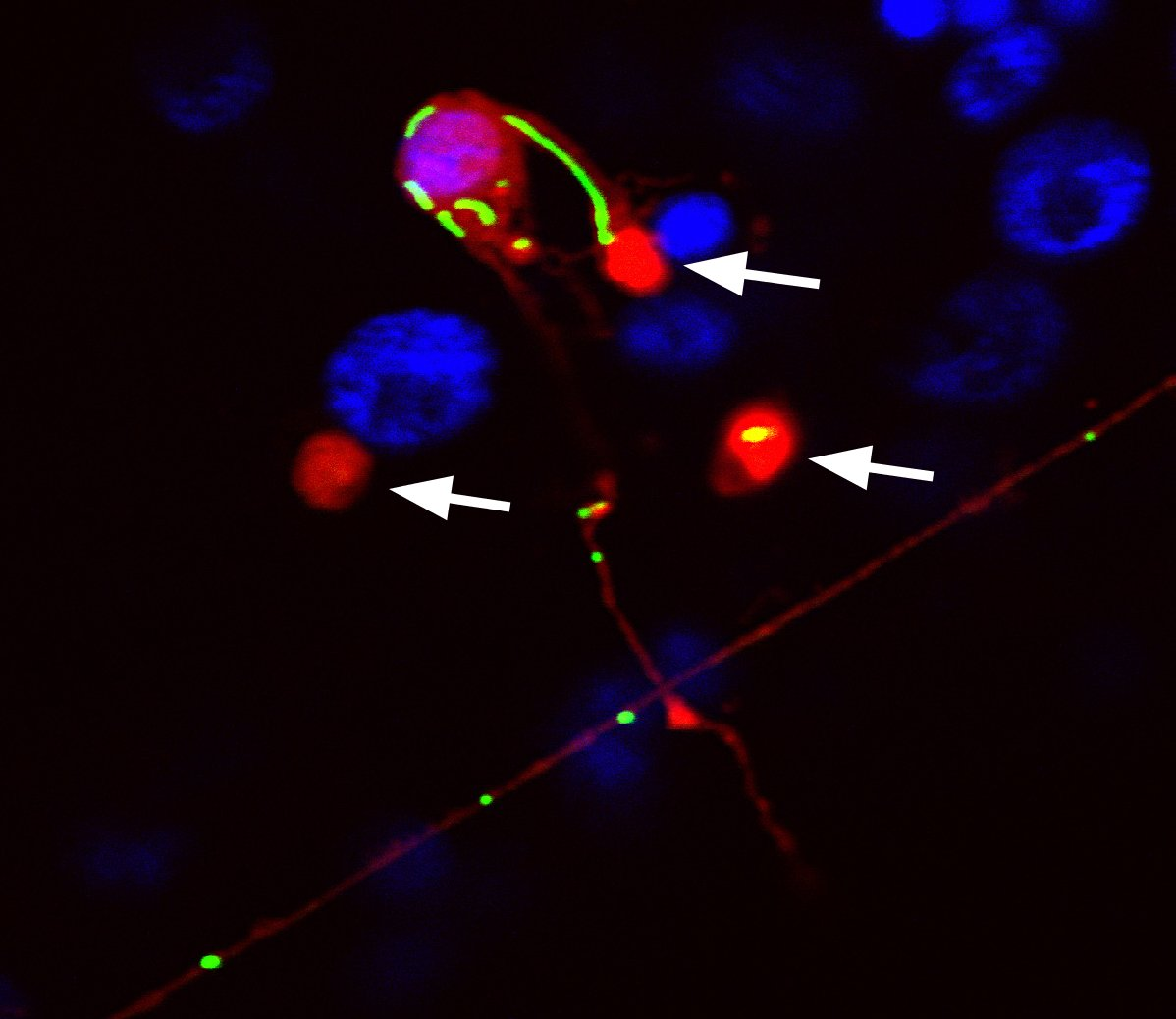
Multiple exophers produced by a mechanosensory neuron in C. elegans

Exophers are a type of membrane-bound extracellular vesicle (EV) that are released by budding out of cells into the extracellular space. Exophers can be released by neurons and muscle in the nematode Caenorhabditis elegans and also from murine cardiomyocytes. Exophers were first discovered in 2017 in the lab of Monica Driscoll at Rutgers University.

Exophers are notable for their large size, averaging approximately four microns in diameter, and they are able to expel whole organelles, such as mitochondria and lysosomes as cargo. An exopher can initially remain attached to the cell that produced it by a membranous filament that resembles a tunneling nanotube. Exophers share similarities with large oncosomes, but they differ in that they are produced by physiologically normal cells instead of aberrant cells associated with tumors.

Exopher production is thought to be a mechanism cells use to preserve homeostasis. Exophers are produced in response to numerous stressors including intracellular protein aggregation, reactive oxygen species (ROS), heat, osmotic hyertonicity, starvation, and even space flight. Extracellular signaling receptor MERTK, expressed by cardiac-resident macrophages, is necessary for exopher clearance by phagocytosis in mouse-derived cardiac tissue.

Exophers may be relevant to disease. In mouse heart, eliminating macrophages or blocking their ability to engulf exophers lead to inflammation and ventricular dysregulation. Exophers may also promote pathological protein spreading in neurodegenerative diseases due to their ability to carry aggregated proteins outside of neurons, including human huntingtin protein.
