= Cytotherapy (journal) =

- Discipline: Cell biology, immunology, stem cells
- Language: English
- Edited by: Edwin Horwitz

Publication details
- Former names: Cytokines, Cellular and Molecular Therapy; Cytokines and Molecular therapy
- History: 1999-present
- Publisher: Elsevier on behalf of the International Society for Cell & Gene Therapy
- Frequency: 12/year
- Impact factor: 5.414 (2020)

Standard abbreviations
- ISO 4: Cytotherapy

Indexing
- CODEN: CYTRF3
- ISSN: 1465-3249 (print); 1477-2566 (web)
- LCCN: 00243205
- OCLC no.: 288963798

Links
- Journal homepage; Online access; Online archive

Cytotherapy is a peer-reviewed medical journal covering the areas of cell and gene therapy. The journal was established in 1999 and is published by Elsevier on behalf of the International Society for Cell & Gene Therapy (ISCT). Cytotherapy is edited by Editor-in-Chief Edwin Horwitz, Managing Editor Kenneth W. Witwer, Commissioning Editor Patrick Hanley, and Assistant Editor Rachel Burga.

== Aims and Scope ==
The Journal publishes novel and innovative results from high quality scientific and clinical studies in the fields of cell and gene therapy. Cytotherapy publishes articles exploring the following topics:

- Development and/or characterization of novel gene therapies and cell and/or extracellular vesicle (EV)-based therapeutics.
- Design of novel therapeutic approaches employing cell/EV/gene products.
- Mode of action of cell/EV/gene therapies in relevant cell-based and pre-clinical models.
- Identification of novel biomarkers that predict the potency of cell/EV/gene therapies and/or stratify patients based on response rates.
- Role of stem/stromal cells and/or EVs in disease pathophysiology.
- Early and late phase clinical studies evaluating the safety and efficacy of cell/EV/gene therapies.
- Important advances in cell/EV/gene-based product manufacturing and validation.
- Global/regional regulatory practices that impact the authorized use and/or regulatory approval of cell/EV and gene therapies.

== Abstracting and indexing ==
This journal is abstracted and indexed in Science Citation Index Expanded, Current Contents/Clinical Medicine, Current Contents/ Life Sciences, BIOSIS Previews, and MEDLINE/PubMed. According to the Journal Citation Reports, the journal has a 2020 impact factor of 5.414.
