= Journal of Extracellular Vesicles =

- Discipline: Cell biology
- Language: English
- Edited by: Hang Yin,Jennifer Jones,

Publication details
- History: 2012-present
- Publisher: Wiley on behalf of the International Society for Extracellular Vesicles
- Frequency: Continuous
- Open access: Yes
- Impact factor: 21.7 (2025)

Standard abbreviations
- ISO 4: J. Extracell. Vesicles

Indexing
- CODEN: JEVOA4
- ISSN: 2001-3078
- OCLC no.: 1010600433

Links
- Journal homepage; Online access; Online archive

The Journal of Extracellular Vesicles (JEV) is a peer-reviewed open-access scientific journal of the International Society for Extracellular Vesicles (ISEV). As one of two official journals of ISEV, the other being the Journal of Extracellular Biology, JEV covers research on lipid bilayer-delimited particles known as extracellular vesicles (EVs). EVs are released from cells and include endosome-origin exosomes and plasma membrane-derived ectosomes/microvesicles. The journal was established in 2012 and is currently published by Wiley. The founding editors-in-chief were Clotilde Théry (Institut Curie), Yong Song Gho (Pohang University of Science and Technology), and Peter Quesenberry (Brown University). The current editor-in-chief is Jan Lötvall (University of Gothenburg/ExoCoBio).

== Scope ==
JEV considers research articles as well as review articles, short communications, technical notes, hypotheses, position papers, editorials, and letters to the editor. The journal has published the current consensus guidelines for the EV field, the Minimal Information for Studies of EVs (MISEV2023), building on previous guidelines released in 2018 and 2014 ("MISEV2018" and "MISEV2014").

== Notable articles ==
The journal has published numerous influential articles. These include position papers of ISEV as well as the periodically updated consensus guidelines for the EV field, which are based on expert opinion and crowdsourcing. Several key articles were summarized in an editorial in 2019 by the then-outgoing editors-in-chief.

- The current consensus guidelines for the EV field, known as "MISEV2023", were prepared with input from more than 1050 co-authors. The corresponding authors are Joshua Welsh, Deborah Goberdhan, Lorraine O'Driscoll, Clotilde Théry and Kenneth Witwer.
- Previous versions of MISEV are MISEV2018, with nearly 400 co-authors, and MISEV2014.
- The first position paper of ISEV was published in 2013, following a workshop on RNA and EVs that was held in New York City in October 2012.
- A position paper on therapeutic applications of EVs was published in 2015.
- A comprehensive review article on EVs was published in 2015 by María Yáñez-Mó, Pia Siljander, and colleagues.
- Considerations for studies of RNA and EVs were recommended in 2017 following a Workshop in Utrecht, The Netherlands
- During the COVID-19 pandemic, ISEV and the International Society for Gene and Cell Therapy released a statement on EV therapies for COVID-19.
- The nomenclature of EVs was addressed in "Extracellular vesicles or exosomes? On primacy, precision, and popularity influencing a choice of nomenclature".

== History ==
JEV was established in April 2012, soon after the founding of ISEV. The journal was published by Co-Action Publishing for more than four years. Taylor & Francis acquired Co-Action in 2016 and published the journal until 2020. Wiley is the current publisher.

== Abstracting and indexing ==
The journal is abstracted and indexed in:

- Biological Abstracts
- BIOSIS Previews
- Chemical Abstracts Service
- Current Contents/Life Sciences
- EBSCO databases
- Embase
- ProQuest databases
- Science Citation Index Expanded
- Scopus

According to the Journal Citation Reports, the journal has a 2022 impact factor of 16.0.
