= Monica Driscoll =

American biochemist and geneticist

Monica A. Driscoll
- Occupations: Distinguished Professor of Molecular Biology and Biochemistry
- Awards: Alfred P. Sloan Research Fellow (1993-1995)

Academic background
- Education: Rutgers University (A.B.)
- Alma mater: Harvard University (Ph.D.)
- Thesis: Regulation of Amino Acid Biosynthesis in S. cerevisiae
- Doctoral advisor: Dr. Helen Greer

Academic work
- Discipline: Biochemist
- Sub-discipline: Genetics
- Institutions: Rutgers University (1991 - present); Columbia University (1985 - 1991)
- Website: https://sites.rutgers.edu/driscoll-lab/

Dr. Monica A. Driscoll is a biochemist known for her research on neuronal aging and degeneration in the model organism C. elegans. She is a Distinguished Professor of Molecular Biology and Biochemistry at Rutgers University. She was elected to the National Academy of Sciences in 2023 for her work in genetics and cellular and molecular neuroscience.

== Early life and education ==
Driscoll earned her A.B. in Chemistry summa cum laude in 1979 from Douglass College of Rutgers University. She earned her Ph.D. from Harvard University in the Department of Cellular and Developmental Biology under Dr. Helen Greer in 1985 for her research on the regulation of gene expression in the model yeast, Saccharomyces cerevisiae. Her thesis is titled Regulation of Amino Acid Biosynthesis in S. cerevisiae.

== Career ==
After earning her doctorate, Driscoll began research on the model animal system, Caenorhabditis elegans to understand the molecular mechanisms and genetics of neuronal degeneration. She briefly worked with Dr. Dan Stinchomb and Dr. Victor Ambros at Harvard University after graduation. Driscoll worked from 1985 to 1991 as a Post-doctoral Research Fellow in Nobel prize winner Dr. Martin Chalfie's lab.

Driscoll was hired as a professor at Rutgers University in 1991 in the Department of Molecular Biology and Biochemistry. She earned her tenure there in 1997 and became a distinguished professor in 2015. Her laboratory focuses on the biology of aging and neurodegeneration. This research has important applications in understanding neurodegenerative diseases, such as Parkinson's Disease.

Driscoll's lab is credited with discovering exophers in 2017 in C. elegans. Exophers are cellular "trash bags" which aid in removing physiological waste from some cell types, including muscle and neuron cells, in response to stressors.

Driscoll was inducted into the National Academy of Sciences in 2023 in genetics (primary subfield) and cellular and molecular neuroscience (secondary subfield). Driscoll served on the National Institute on Aging National Advisory Committee on Aging from 2019 to 2023.
