= International Society for Extracellular Vesicles =

- Founded: 2011
- Type: Professional organization
- Purpose: Extracellular vesicles
- Region served: Worldwide
- Method: Conferences, publications, education
- Members: >2000
- Key people: Benedetta Bussolati (president] Kenneth W. Witwer (immediate president] Edit Buzás (past-president); Clotilde Théry (past-president and founding secretary general); Andrew Hill (past-president); Jan Lötvall (founding president)
- Website: isev.org

The International Society for Extracellular Vesicles (ISEV) is an international scientific organization that focuses on advancing global extracellular vesicle (EV) research. These membrane-bound particles are released from all known cells and include exosomes, ectosomes, exophers, oncosomes, and more. Established in 2011, the society is a nonprofit organization. It is governed by a Board of Directors and Executive Committee. The current president is Benedetta Bussolati. Previous presidents were Kenneth Witwer (2024-2026), Edit Buzás (2022-2024), Clotilde Théry (2018-2022), Andrew Hill (2016-2018) and founding president Jan Lötvall (2011-2016). The society's journals are the Journal of Extracellular Vesicles and the Journal of Extracellular Biology. ISEV also publishes the international consensus guidelines for EV studies, the "Minimal information for studies of EVs" (MISEV).

ISEV has several committees (Meetings and Programs, Science and Journals, Rigor and Standardization, Education, Translation, Regulation, and Advocacy Committee, and Communications and Membership) focused on advancing research and promoting awareness in the EVs. Each committee has specific roles and goals.

== Meetings ==
As part of its mission to promote scientific research and education, the society hosts annual meetings and educational event as well as numerous workshops on defined EV-related topics. The society also co-sponsors or endorses related events.

Annual meeting	Location
ISEV2027	Busan, South Korea
ISEV2026	San Juan, Puerto Rico
ISEV2025	Vienna, Austria
ISEV2024	Melbourne, Australia
ISEV2023	Seattle, USA
ISEV2022	Lyon, France
ISEV2021	Virtual Meeting
ISEV2020	Virtual Meeting
ISEV2019	Kyoto, Japan
ISEV2018	Barcelona, Spain
ISEV2017	Toronto, Canada
ISEV2016	Rotterdam, Netherlands
ISEV2015	Washington DC, USA
ISEV2014	Rotterdam, Netherlands
ISEV2013	Boston, USA
ISEV2012	Gothenburg, Sweden

=== Workshops and scientific seminars ===
ISEV workshops began with a meeting on extracellular RNA (New York City, 2012), and continue to include one to two meetings per year. During widespread restrictions on in-person meetings during the COVID-19 pandemic, ISEV introduced the "Extracellular Vesicle Club," a weekly virtual event featuring presentations and moderated discussion of scientific publications.

Topic	Location	Year
ISEV Cardiovascular Research (ISEV-CVR)	United Kingdom	December 2026
ISEVxTech 2026	United States	November 2026
Bacterial and Viral Vesicles: Biogenesis, Communication, and Translational Application	China	September 2026
EVs in Immunity	Greece	November 2025
Second Symposium on EVs in Nervous System	Canada	October 2025
Education Day on Single EV Characterization of Genitourinary System EVs	Virtual	February 2025
Blood EVs	South Korea	September 2024
Large Extracellular Vesicles	United States	March 2024
EV-based Biomarkers	Denmark	October 2023
Workshop by EV-TRACK Task Force	Virtual	March 2023
The Second Urine EV Task Force Virtual Symposium on Urinary Extracellular Vesicles	Virtual	February 2023
QuantitatEVs: Multiscale analyses, from bulk to single vesicle	Rome and Milan	January-February 2023
Blood EVs: an ISEV Workshop	Finland	September 2022
massivEVs Workshop	Italy/Virtually	October 2021
Infectious Diseases Meeting	Virtual	January 2021
EV Imaging in Vivo	France	September 2020
EVs in Immunology	Buenos Aires	March 2020
Open, Reproducible and Standardized EV Research	Belgium	December 2019
EV-based Clinical Theranostics	China	November 2018
Membranes and EVs Workshop	United States	March 2018
Extracellular Vesicles as Biomarkers of Disease	United Kingdom	December 2017
Diet, Environment and Extracellular Vesicles	Australia	January 2017
Cross-Organism Communication by Extracellular Vesicles: Hosts, Microbes, Parasites	Brazil	November 2016
Research Seminar: EV-associated RNA: Is there a purpose?	Netherlands	September 2015
ISEV Workshop on Isolation and Characterization of Extracellular Vesicles	Hungary	October 2013
ISEV RNA Workshop	United States	October 2012

=== Endorsed or co-sponsored events ===
The society has directly or indirectly supported EV-related events around the world. These include meetings of the UK, French, and Spanish and Portuguese EV Societies (GEIVEX), a course of the European Molecular Biology Laboratory, Keystone Symposia (2016 and 2018), Gordon Research Conferences (2016, 2018, and 2022), a Cold Spring Harbor Asia Meeting (2016), and others.

== Journal of Extracellular Vesicles, Journal of Extracellular Biology, and standardization initiatives ==
To disseminate research in the field, the society established the peer-reviewed open access Journal of Extracellular Vesicles in 2012. The journal was initially published by Co-Action Publishing, by Taylor & Francis from 2016 to 2020, and by Wiley since 2020. In addition to research and review articles, the journal periodically publishes position papers of the society that are meant to advance standardization efforts. In 2014, the Executive Board of Directors published a set of minimal information guidelines for publication of EV studies. These requirements, known as "MISEV" or "MISEV2014," mirrored similar initiatives in the fields of microarray (MIAME) and proteomics (MIAPE) analysis, among others. In 2017, the society's board announced its intent to update these requirements with community involvement. The "MISEV2018" requirements were published in 2018 by Clotilde Théry and Kenneth Witwer with input from 380 co-authors. The current consensus guidelines, known as "MISEV2023", were prepared with input from more than 1050 co-authors, using extensive crowdsourcing of expert opinion to build consensus. The corresponding authors are Joshua Welsh, Deborah Goberdhan, Lorraine O'Driscoll, Clotilde Théry and Kenneth Witwer.

In 2021, ISEV founded a second journal, the Journal of Extracellular Biology, focusing on EVs but also other extracellular particles (EPs) and phenomena. The editor-in-chief is Andrew Hill.

== Education ==
Among the educational initiatives of the society are massive open online courses (MOOCs), launched in 2016. MOOC 1&II are available through Coursera and co-sponsored by the University of Gothenburg, Pohang University of Science and Technology, and the University of California, Irvine. MOOC III is available on YouTube

== Student Network on Extracellular Vesicles ==
In 2020, the Student Network on Extracellular Vesicles (SNEV) was founded as a virtual network for early-career researchers in EV research. SNEV's activities include organizing online scientific talks, a monthly newsletter, industry talks and informal meet-and-greets (coffee catch ups). SNEV has organized two virtual conferences, one in 2021 and the second in 2023. Since 2024, SNEV has become the official early career entity within ISEV.

[TD1]Link to Student Network on Extracellular Vesicles (wordpress.com)
