= Yin Hang =

Yin Hang or Hang Yin is the name of:

- Hang Yin (scientist) (born 1976), Chinese-born biochemist at the University of Colorado Boulder, USA
- Hang Yin (actress)(born 1988), French actress of Chinese origin
- Yin Hang (table tennis) (born 1994), Chinese table tennis player
- Yin Hang (racewalker) (born 1997), Chinese racewalker
