= Respiratory Research =

- Discipline: Pulmonology
- Language: English
- Edited by: Oliver Schildgen; Kelan Tantisira

Publication details
- History: 2000-present
- Publisher: BioMed Central
- Frequency: Upon acceptance
- Open access: Yes
- Impact factor: 7.162 (2021)

Standard abbreviations
- ISO 4: Respir. Res.

Indexing
- CODEN: RREEBZ
- ISSN: 1465-9921 (print); 1465-993X (web)
- LCCN: 2001243154
- OCLC no.: 47218396

Links
- Journal homepage; Online access; Online archive

Respiratory Research is an open access peer-reviewed medical journal published by BioMed Central. It covers all aspects of respiratory disease, including clinical and basic research. The journal publishes research articles, commentaries, letters to the editor, and reviews.

== Abstracting and indexing ==
The journal is abstracted and indexed in PubMed/MEDLINE, Chemical Abstracts Service, CAB International, Current Contents, and the Science Citation Index Expanded. According to the Journal Citation Reports, its 2016 impact factor is 3.841, ranking it 8th out of 50 journals in the category "Respiratory System".
