= ExoCarta =

Content
- Description: Exosomal proteins, RNA and lipids database

Contact
- Research center: La Trobe Institute for Molecular Science
- Authors: Suresh Mathivanan

Access
- Website: http://www.exocarta.org

ExoCarta is a manually curated database of exosomal proteins, RNA and lipids.

Exosomes are cell-derived vesicles that are present in many and perhaps all biological fluids, including blood, urine, and cultured medium of cell cultures. The reported diameter of exosomes is between 30 and 100 nm, which is larger than LDL, but much smaller than for example, red blood cells. Exosomes are either released from the cell when multivesicular bodies fuse with the plasma membrane or they are released directly from the plasma membrane. It is becoming increasingly clear that exosomes have specialized functions and play a key role in, for example, coagulation, intercellular signaling, and waste management. Consequently, there is a growing interest in the clinical applications of exosomes. Exosomes can potentially be used for prognosis, therapy, and biomarkers for health and disease.

== Bioinformatics analysis of exosomes ==
Exosomes contain RNA, proteins, lipids and metabolites that is reflective of the cell type of origin. As exosomes contain numerous bioactive molecules, including proteins, nucleic acids, lipids, sugars, and related conjugates, large scale analysis including proteomics and transcriptomics is often performed. Currently, to analyse these data, non-commercial tools such as FunRich can be used to identify over-represented groups of molecules.
