= Exosome (vesicle) =

Membrane-bound extracellular vesicles

Exosome (extracellular vesicle)
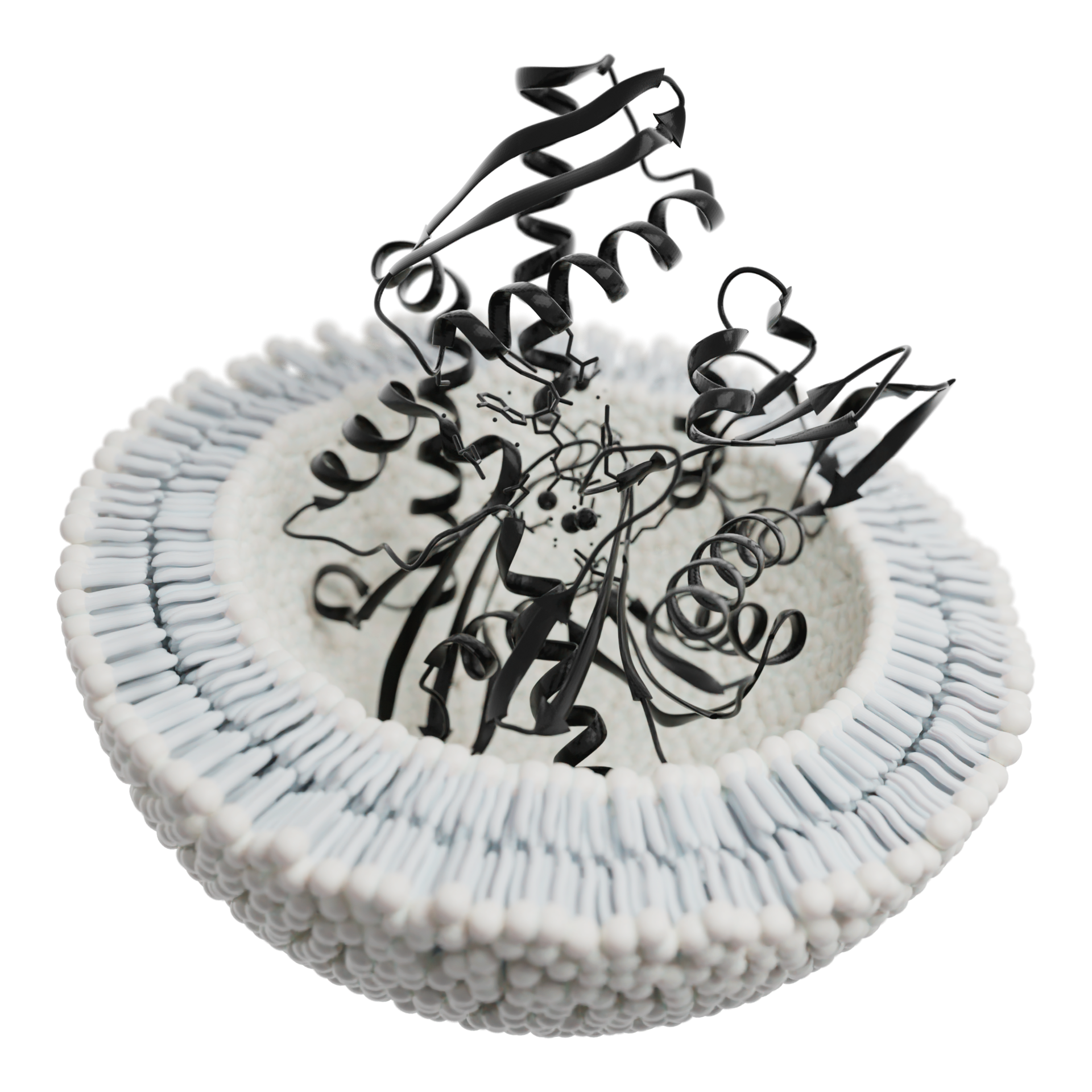
- Exosome cross-section showing hsp70 protein

Identifiers
- MeSH: D055354

Exosomes, ranging in size from 30 to 150 nanometers, are membrane-bound extracellular vesicles (EVs) that are produced in the endosomal compartment of most eukaryotic cells. In multicellular organisms, exosomes and other EVs are found in biological fluids including saliva, blood, urine and cerebrospinal fluid. EVs have specialized functions in physiological processes, from coagulation and waste management to intercellular communication.

Exosomes are formed through the inward budding of a late endosome, also known as a multivesicular body (MVB). The intraluminal vesicles (ILVs) of the multivesicular body (MVB) bud inward into the endosomal lumen. If the MVB fuses with the cell surface (the plasma membrane), these ILVs are released as exosomes. Exosomes were also identified within the tissue matrix, coined Matrix-Bound Nanovesicles (MBV). They are also released in vitro by cultured cells into their growth medium. Enriched with a diverse array of biological elements from their source cells, exosomes contain proteins (such as adhesion molecules, cytoskeletons, cytokines, ribosomal proteins, growth factors, and metabolic enzymes), lipids (including cholesterol, lipid rafts, and ceramides), and nucleic acids (such as DNA, mRNA, and miRNA). Since the size of exosomes is limited by that of the parent MVB, exosomes are generally thought to be smaller than most other EVs, from about 30 to 150 nanometres (nm) in diameter: around the same size as many lipoproteins but much smaller than cells. Compared with EVs in general, it is unclear whether exosomes have unique characteristics or functions or can be separated or distinguished effectively from other EVs.

EVs in circulation carry genetic material and proteins from their cell of origin, proteo-transcriptomic signatures that act as biomarkers. In the case of cancer cells, exosomes may show differences in size, shape, morphology, and canonical markers from their donor cells. They may encapsulate relevant information that can be used for disease detection. Consequently, there is a growing interest in clinical applications of EVs as biomarkers and therapies alike, prompting establishment of an International Society for Extracellular Vesicles (ISEV) and a scientific journal devoted to EVs, the Journal of Extracellular Vesicles.

== Background ==
Exosomes were first discovered in the maturing mammalian reticulocyte (immature red blood cell) by Stahl and group in 1983 and Johnstone and group in 1983 further termed 'exosomes' by Johnstone and group in 1987. Exosomes were shown to participate in selective removal of many plasma membrane proteins as the reticulocyte becomes a mature red blood cell (erythrocyte). In the reticulocyte, as in most mammalian cells, portions of the plasma membrane are regularly internalized as endosomes, with 50 to 180% of the plasma membrane being recycled every hour. In turn, parts of the membranes of some endosomes are subsequently internalized as smaller vesicles. Such endosomes are called multivesicular bodies because of their appearance, with many small vesicles, (ILVs or "intralumenal endosomal vesicles"), inside the larger body. The ILVs become exosomes if the MVB merges with the cell membrane, releasing the internal vesicles into the extracellular space. The term "exosome" was coined and used first by Eberhard Trams and colleagues in 1981 for extracellular vesicles but Johnstone used it specifically for vesicles formed by fusion of multivesicular bodies.

Exosomes contain various molecular constituents of their cell of origin, including proteins and RNA. Although the exosomal protein composition varies with the cell and tissue of origin, most exosomes contain an evolutionarily-conserved common set of protein molecules. The protein content of a single exosome, given certain assumptions of protein size and configuration, and packing parameters, can be about 20,000 molecules. The cargo of mRNA and miRNA in exosomes was first discovered at the University of Gothenburg in Sweden.

The content of exosomes changes depending on the cells of origin, and they thereby reflect their originating cells. Analysis of the dynamic variation of exosomes may provide a valuable means of monitoring diseases. In that study, the differences in cellular and exosomal mRNA and miRNA content was described, as well as the functionality of the exosomal mRNA cargo. Exosomes have also been shown to carry double-stranded DNA.

Exosomes can transfer molecules from one cell to another via membrane vesicle trafficking, thereby influencing the immune system, such as dendritic cells and B cells, and may play a functional role in mediating adaptive immune responses to pathogens and tumors. Therefore, scientists who are actively researching the role that exosomes may play in cell-to-cell signaling, often hypothesize that delivery of their cargo RNA molecules can explain biological effects. For example, mRNA in exosomes has been suggested to affect protein production in the recipient cell. However, another study has suggested that miRNAs in exosomes secreted by mesenchymal stem cells (MSC) are predominantly pre- and not mature miRNAs. Because the authors of this study did not find RNA-induced silencing complex-associated proteins in these exosomes, they suggested that only the pre-miRNAs, but not the mature miRNAs in MSC exosomes, have the potential to be biologically active in the recipient cells. Multiple mechanisms have been reported to be involved in loading miRNAs into exosomes, including specific motifs in the miRNA sequences, interactions with long non-coding RNA (lncRNA) localized to the exosomes, interactions with RNA-binding proteins (RBP), and post-translational modifications of Argonaute (Ago) proteins.

Conversely, exosome production and content may be influenced by molecular signals received by the cell of origin. As evidence for this hypothesis, tumor cells exposed to hypoxia secrete exosomes with enhanced angiogenic and metastatic potential, suggesting that tumor cells adapt to a hypoxic microenvironment by secreting exosomes to stimulate angiogenesis or facilitate metastasis to more favorable environment.

== Critique of Extracellular Vesicle-Associated RNA Function ==
While the hypothesis that exosomal RNA can mediate biological effects in recipient cells is compelling, definitive, rigorous evidence demonstrating functional extracellular RNA (exRNA) transfer in mammals remains limited. Although functional nucleic acid exchange is well-documented in plants and nematodes, the mammalian context presents unique experimental challenges. The mere presence of RNAs in extracellular vesicles does not necessarily imply biological function, as RNA degradation, passive release, and contamination from cellular debris can confound interpretations.

== Terminology ==
Evolving consensus in the field is that the term "exosome" should be applied strictly to an EV of endosomal origin. Since it can be difficult to prove such an origin after an EV has left the cell, variations on the term "extracellular vesicle" are often appropriate instead.

== Research ==
Exosomes from red blood cells contain the transferrin receptor that is absent in mature erythrocytes. Dendritic cell-derived exosomes express MHC I, MHC II, and costimulatory molecules and have been proven to be able to induce and enhance antigen-specific T cell responses in vivo. In addition, the first exosome-based cancer vaccination platforms are being explored in early clinical trials. Exosomes can also be released into urine by the kidneys, and their detection might serve as a diagnostic tool. Urinary exosomes may be useful as treatment response markers in prostate cancer. Exosomes secreted from tumour cells can deliver signals to surrounding cells and have been shown to regulate myofibroblast differentiation. In melanoma, tumor-derived vesicles can enter lymphatics and interact with subcapsular sinus macrophages and B cells in lymph nodes. A recent investigation showed that exosome release positively correlates with the invasiveness of ovarian cancer. Exosomes released from tumors into the blood may also have diagnostic potential. Exosomes are remarkably stable in bodily fluids strengthening their utility as reservoirs for disease biomarkers. Patient blood samples stored in biorepositories can be used for biomarker analysis as colorectal cancer cell-derived exosomes spiked into blood plasma could be recovered after 90 days of storage at various temperatures.

In malignancies such as cancer, the regulatory circuit that guards exosome homeostasis is co-opted to promote cancer cell survival and metastasis. In breast cancers, neratinib, a novel pan-ErbB inhibitor, is able to downmodulate the amount of HER2 released by exosomes, thus potentially reducing tumor dissemination.

Urinary exosomes have also proven to be useful in the detection of many pathologies, such as genitourinary cancers and mineralocorticoid hypertension, through their protein and miRNA cargo."

With neurodegenerative disorders, exosomes appear to play a role in the spread of alpha-synuclein, and are being actively investigated as a tool to both monitor disease progression as well as a potential vehicle for delivery of drug and stem cell based therapy.

An online open access database containing genomic information for exosome content has been developed to catalyze research development within the field.

== Exosomes and intercellular communication ==
Scientists are actively researching the role that exosomes may play in cell-to-cell signaling, hypothesizing that because exosomes can merge with and release their contents into cells that are distant from their cell of origin (see membrane vesicle trafficking), they may influence processes in the recipient cell. For example, RNA that is shuttled from one cell to another, known as "exosomal shuttle RNA," could potentially affect protein production in the recipient cell. The role played by exosomes in cell-cell or interorgan communication and metabolic regulation was reviewed by Samuelson and Vidal-Puig in 2018. By transferring molecules from one cell to another, exosomes from certain cells of the immune system, such as dendritic cells and B cells, may play a functional role in mediating adaptive immune responses to pathogens and tumors. Exosomal export of miRNA molecules is also linked to the arrest of intercellular miRNA levels and affect their functionality by arresting them on heavy polysomes.

Conversely, exosome production and content may be influenced by molecular signals received by the cell of origin. As evidence for this hypothesis, tumor cells exposed to hypoxia secrete exosomes with enhanced angiogenic and metastatic potential, suggesting that tumor cells adapt to a hypoxic microenvironment by secreting exosomes to stimulate angiogenesis or facilitate metastasis to more favorable environment. It has recently been shown that exosomal protein content may change during the progression of chronic lymphocytic leukemia.

A study hypothesized that intercellular communication of tumor exosomes could mediate further regions of metastasis for cancer. Hypothetically, exosomes can plant tumor information, such as tainted RNA, into new cells to prepare for cancer to travel to that organ for metastasis. The study found that tumor exosomal communication has the ability to mediate metastasis to different organs. Furthermore, even when tumor cells have a disadvantage for replicating, the information planted at these new regions, organs, can aid in the expansion of organ specific metastasis.

Exosomes carry cargo, which can augment innate immune responses. For example, exosomes derived from Salmonella enterica-infected macrophages but not exosomes from uninfected cells stimulate naive macrophages and dendritic cells to secrete pro-inflammatory cytokines such as TNF-α, RANTES, IL-1RA, MIP-2, CXCL1, MCP-1, sICAM-1, GM-CSF, and G-CSF. Proinflammatory effects of exosomes are partially attributed to lipopolysaccharide, which is encapsulated within exosomes.

Exosomes also mediate the cross talk between the embryo and maternal compartment during implantation.They help to exchange ubiquitous protein, glycoproteins, DNA and mRNA.

== Exosome biogenesis, secretion, and uptake ==
=== Exosomes biogenesis ===
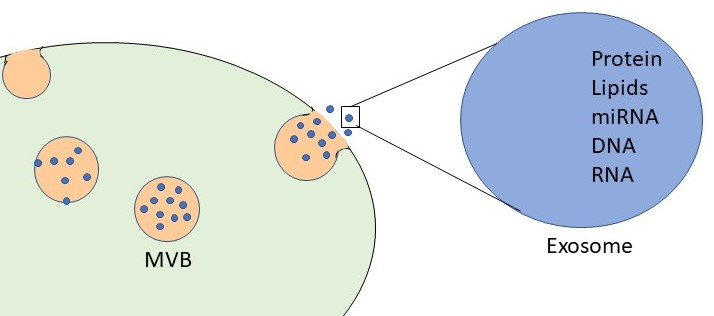
Exosomes are extracellular vesicles having a unique biogenesis pathway via multivesicular bodies.

Exosome formation starts with the invagination of the multi-vesicular bodies (MVBs) or late endosomes to generate intraluminal vesicles (ILVs). There are various proposed mechanisms for formation of MVBs, vesicle budding, and sorting. The most studied and well known is the endosomal sorting complex required for transport (ESCRT) dependent pathway. ESCRT machinery mediates the ubiquitinated pathway consisting of protein complexes; ESCRT-0, -I, -II, -III, and associated ATPase VPS4. ESCRT 0 recognizes and retains ubiquitinated proteins marked for packaging in the late endosomal membrane. ESCRT I/II recognizes the ESCRT 0 and starts creating involution of the membrane into the MVB. ESCRT III forms a spiral-shaped structure constricting the neck. ATPase VPS4 protein drives the membrane scission. Syndecan-syntenin-ALIX exosome biogenesis pathway are one of the ESCRT-independent or non-canonical pathways for exosome biogenesis.

=== Exosome secretion ===
The MVBs once formed are trafficked to the internal side of the plasma membrane. These MVBs are transported to the plasma membrane leading to fusion. Many studies have shown that MVBs having higher cholesterol content fuse with the plasma membrane thus releasing exosomes. The Rab proteins especially Rab 7 attached to the MVB recognizes its effector receptor. The SNARE complex (soluble N- ethylmaleimide- sensitive fusion attachment protein receptor) from the MVB and the plasma membrane interacts and mediates fusion.

=== Exosome uptake ===
Specific targeting by exosomes is an active area of research. The exact mechanisms of exosome targeting is limited to a few general mechanisms like docking of the exosomes with specific proteins, sugars, and lipid, or micropinocytosis. The internalized exosomes are targeted to the endosomes which release their content in the recipient cell.

== Sorting and packaging of cargoes in exosomes ==
Exosomes contain different cargoes; proteins, lipids, and nucleic acids. These cargoes are specifically sorted and packaged into exosomes. The contents packaged into exosomes are cell type specific and also influenced by cellular conditions. Exosomal microRNAs (exomiRNAs) and proteins are sorted and packaged in exosomes. Villarroya-Beltri and colleagues identified a conserved GGAG specific motif, EXOmotif, in the miRNA packaged in the exosomes which was absent in the cytosolic miRNA (CLmiRNA), which binds to sumoylated heterogeneous nuclear riboprotein (hnRNP) A2B1 for exosome specific miRNA packaging. Proteins are packaged in ESCRT, tetraspanins, lipid- dependent mechanisms. Exosomes are enriched in cholesterol, sphingomyelin, saturated phosphatidylcholine and phosphatidylethanolamine as compared to the plasma membrane of the cell.

== Isolation ==
The isolation and detection of exosomes has proven to be complicated. Due to the complexity of body fluids, physical separation of exosomes from cells and similar-sized particles is challenging. Isolation of exosomes using differential ultracentrifugation results in co-isolation of protein and other contaminants and incomplete separation of vesicles from lipoproteins. Combining ultracentrifugation with micro-filtration or a gradient can improve purity. Single step isolation of extracellular vesicles by size-exclusion chromatography has been demonstrated to provide greater efficiency for recovering intact vesicles over centrifugation, although a size-based technique alone will not be able to distinguish exosomes from other vesicle types. To isolate a pure population of exosomes a combination of techniques is necessary, based on both physical (e.g. size, density) and biochemical parameters (e.g. presence/absence of certain proteins involved in their biogenesis). The use of reference materials such as trackable recombinant EV will assist in mitigating technical variation introduced during sample preparation and analysis. Novel selective isolation methodology has been using a combination of immunoaffinity chromatography and asymmetric-flow field-flow fractionation to reduce the contamination from lipoproteins and other proteins when isolating from blood plasma.

Exosomes are small extracellular vesicles that play a crucial role in cell-to-cell communication by transporting proteins, lipids, microRNAs, and functional mRNAs. Their potential in disease diagnostics, prognostics, and therapeutics has garnered significant interest in the biomedical field. Traditional methods for isolating exosomes are often hindered by low purity, inefficiency, lengthy processing times, and the need for substantial sample volumes and specialized equipment. Recent advancements in microfluidic devices, particularly those integrating nanostructures, offer promising alternatives for exosome isolation. These devices can be categorized based on their capture mechanisms: passive-structure-based affinity, immunomagnetic-based affinity, filtration, acoustofluidics, electrokinetics, and optofluidics. Microfluidic platforms not only improve the efficiency and purity of exosome isolation but also address the limitations of conventional methods, paving the way for their application in both research and clinical settings.

Often, functional as well as antigenic assays are applied to derive useful information from multiple exosomes. Well-known examples of assays to detect proteins in total populations of exosomes are mass spectrometry and Western blot. However, a limitation of these methods is that contaminants may be present that affect the information obtained from such assays. Preferably, information is derived from single exosomes. Relevant properties of exosomes to detect include size, density, morphology, composition, and zeta potential.

== Detection ==
Since the diameter of exosomes is typically below 100 nm and because they have a low refractive index, exosomes are below the detection range of many currently used techniques. A number of miniaturized systems, exploiting nanotechnology and microfluidics, have been developed to expedite exosome analyses. These new systems include a microNMR device, a nanoplasmonic chip, and a magneto-electrochemical sensor for protein profiling; and an integrated fluidic cartridge for RNA detection. Flow cytometry is an optical method to detect exosomes in suspension. Nevertheless, the applicability of flow cytometry to detect single exosomes is still inadequate due to limited sensitivity and potential measurement artifacts such as swarm detection. Other methods to detect single exosomes are atomic force microscopy, nanoparticle tracking analysis, Raman microspectroscopy, tunable resistive pulse sensing, and transmission electron microscopy.

== Bioinformatics analysis ==
Exosomes contain RNA, proteins, lipids and metabolites that is reflective of the cell type of origin. As exosomes contain numerous proteins, RNA and lipids, large scale analysis including proteomics and transcriptomics is often performed. Currently, to analyse these data, non-commercial tools such as FunRich can be used to identify over-represented groups of molecules. With the advent of Next generation sequencing technologies, the research on exosomes have been accelerated in not only cancer but various diseases. Recently, bioinformatics-based analysis of RNA-Seq data of exosomes extracted from Trypanosoma cruzi has shown the association of these extracellular vesicles with various important gene products that strengthens the probability of finding biomarkers for Chagas disease.

== Therapeutics and carriers of drugs ==
Researchers have also found that exosomes released from oral keratinocytes can accelerate wound healing, even when human exosomes were applied to rat wounds.

Epidural or facet joint space administration of exosomes has been shown to be a safe and effective treatment for low back pain in some studies, but more studies are required to verify these results.

Exosome-mediated delivery of superoxide dismutase extends life-span in Caenorhabditis elegans, apparently by reducing the level of reactive oxygen species. Thus this system is being studied for its anti-aging potential. This delivery system also improved survival under conditions of oxidative stress and heat.

Exosomes are being actively researched for their potential in various therapeutic applications. For instance, dendritic cell (DC)-derived exosome vaccines, designed to present tumor antigens to the immune system, are undergoing clinical trials to evaluate their ability to generate personalized anti-tumor immune responses. These exosome-based vaccines have shown potential in generating strong cytotoxic T-lymphocyte responses in cancers like colorectal cancer and are being explored in trials for chronic diseases, such as diabetes and kidney disorders.

Additionally, exosomes are promising carriers for chemotherapeutic agents like doxorubicin and paclitaxel. These engineered exosomes can deliver drugs directly to tumors, thereby minimizing off-target effects while enhancing therapeutic efficacy. Exosomes' ability to cross biological barriers, such as the blood-brain barrier, makes them attractive for treating neurological diseases like glioblastoma and Alzheimer's disease. Preclinical studies suggest that exosomes loaded with amyloid-beta-clearing enzymes or antibodies can reduce amyloid-beta plaques, offering a potential treatment for Alzheimer's.

Moreover, exosomes derived from mesenchymal stem cells (MSCs) are being studied for their ability to promote tissue repair, particularly in cardiac repair post-myocardial infarction, where they deliver cardioprotective molecules that enhance recovery . Exosomes are also being investigated for their role in treating autoimmune conditions like multiple sclerosis and rheumatoid arthritis, where they can carry anti-inflammatory agents to regulate immune responses. The versatility of exosomes continues to expand as they are also explored as vaccine platforms, particularly for infectious diseases such as COVID-19.

== Unapproved marketing ==
Different forms of unproven exosomes are being marketed in the U.S. for a wide variety of health conditions by clinic firms, without authorization from the FDA. Often, these firms also sell non-FDA-approved stem cell injections as well. In late 2019, the FDA issued an advisory warning about noncompliant marketing of exosomes and injuries to patients in Nebraska related to injections of exosomes. The agency also indicated that exosomes are officially drug products requiring pre-market approval. In 2020, the FDA cautioned several firms about marketing or use of exosomes for COVID-19 and other health conditions.

Unapproved marketing of exosomes remains a persistent issue in the U.S., with some companies exploiting regulatory gaps and consumer confusion about these emerging therapies. These companies often operate in a grey zone, marketing exosome products as "minimally manipulated" and thereby attempting to avoid strict FDA regulations. In response, the FDA has increased its enforcement actions in recent years, emphasizing the need for exosome-based products to meet rigorous standards of safety and efficacy, similar to other biological drugs.

The FDA's warnings, particularly around exosome treatments for COVID-19, highlighted how some firms were capitalizing on the global pandemic to promote unverified therapies under the guise of immunity boosters or infection preventatives. Moreover, newer reports indicate that clinics continue to market exosomes for anti-aging, joint pain, and even neurological conditions like Alzheimer's, despite the lack of clinical evidence supporting these claims. Critics argue that this is a dangerous trend, with patients at risk of adverse effects such as inflammation, infection, and in some cases, serious injury.

Interestingly, some clinics are now leveraging the loophole of "cosmetic" labeling to avoid scrutiny. They market exosomes in skincare products, claiming benefits like wrinkle reduction or skin rejuvenation. However, the FDA continues to assert that any use of exosomes, whether for cosmetic or therapeutic purposes, requires formal review and approval due to the potential biological effects of these extracellular vesicles. Regulatory experts warn that such practices, if unchecked, could undermine the credibility of legitimate exosome research and therapeutics being developed through proper channels.

== See also ==
- Prostasomes
- Microvesicles
- Vesicles
- ExoCarta – database of molecules shown to be present in exosomes
