= Microvesicle =

Type of extracellular vesicle

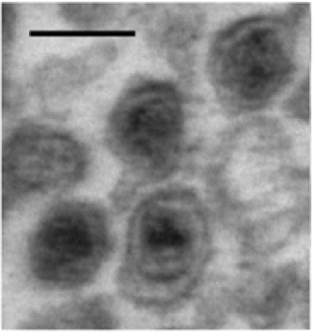
Transmission electron micrograph of lead citrate stained microvesicles. Black bar is 100 nanometers

Microvesicles (ectosomes, or microparticles) are a type of extracellular vesicle (EV) that are released from the cell membrane. In multicellular organisms, microvesicles and other EVs are found both in tissues (in the interstitial space between cells) and in many types of body fluids. Delimited by a phospholipid bilayer, microvesicles can be as small as the smallest EVs (30 nm in diameter) or as large as 1000 nm. They are considered to be larger, on average, than intracellularly-generated EVs known as exosomes. Microvesicles play a role in intercellular communication and can transport molecules such as mRNA, miRNA, and proteins between cells.

Though initially dismissed as cellular debris, microvesicles may reflect the antigenic content of the cell of origin and have a role in cell signaling. Like other EVs, they have been implicated in numerous physiologic processes, including anti-tumor effects, tumor immune suppression, metastasis, tumor-stroma interactions, angiogenesis, and tissue regeneration. Microvesicles may also remove misfolded proteins, cytotoxic agents and metabolic waste from the cell. Changes in microvesicle levels may indicate diseases including cancer.

== Formation and contents ==
Different cells can release microvesicles from the plasma membrane. Sources of microvesicles include megakaryocytes, blood platelets, monocytes, neutrophils, tumor cells and placenta.

Platelets play an important role in maintaining hemostasis: they promote thrombus growth, and thus they prevent loss of blood. Moreover, they enhance immune response, since they express the molecule CD154 (CD40L). Platelets are activated by inflammation, infection, or injury, and after their activation microvesicles containing CD154 are released from platelets. CD154 is a crucial molecule in the development of T cell-dependent humoral immune response. CD154 knockout mice are incapable of producing IgG, IgE, or IgA as a response to antigens. Microvesicles can also transfer prions and molecules CD41 and CXCR4.

=== Endothelial microparticles ===
Endothelial microparticles are small vesicles that are released from endothelial cells and can be found circulating in the blood.

The microparticle consists of a plasma membrane surrounding a small amount of cytosol. The membrane of the endothelial microparticle contains receptors and other cell surface molecules which enable the identification of the endothelial origin of the microparticle, and allow it to be distinguished from microparticles from other cells, such as platelets.

Although circulating endothelial microparticles can be found in the blood of normal individuals, increased numbers of circulating endothelial microparticles have been identified in individuals with certain diseases, including hypertension and cardiovascular disorders, and pre-eclampsia and various forms of vasculitis. The endothelial microparticles in some of these disease states have been shown to have arrays of cell surface molecules reflecting a state of endothelial dysfunction. Therefore, endothelial microparticles may be useful as an indicator or index of the functional state of the endothelium in disease, and may potentially play key roles in the pathogenesis of certain diseases, including rheumatoid arthritis.

Endothelial microparticles have been found to prevent apoptosis in recipient cells by inhibiting the p38 pathway via inactivating mitogen-activated protein kinase (MKP)-1. Uptake of endothelial micoparticles is Annexin I/Phosphatidylserine receptor dependant.

Microparticles are derived from many other cell types.

=== Process of formation ===
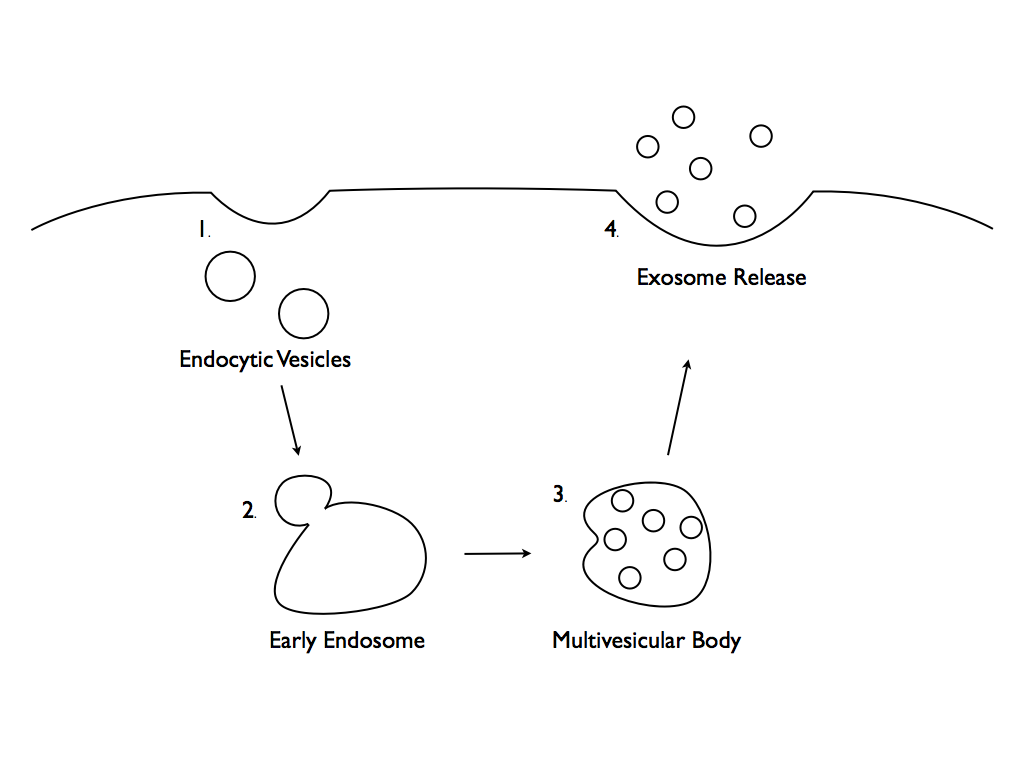
The process of the formation of exosomes. 1. Cell undergoes endocytosis forming endocytic vesicles. 2. Endocytic vesicles fuse together forming an early endosome. 3. Endocytic cisterna matures into exocytic multivesicular body, during which membrane invaginations form exosomes. 4.Multivesicular body fuses with the plasma membrane, releasing exosomes into the extracellular space.

Microvesicles and exosomes are formed and released by two slightly different mechanisms. These processes result in the release of intercellular signaling vesicles. Microvesicles are small, plasma membrane-derived particles that are released into the extracellular environment by the outward budding and fission of the plasma membrane. This budding process involves multiple signaling pathways including the elevation of intracellular calcium and reorganization of the cell's structural scaffolding. The formation and release of microvesicles involve contractile machinery that draws opposing membranes together before pinching off the membrane connection and launching the vesicle into the extracellular space.

Microvesicle budding takes place at unique locations on the cell membrane that are enriched with specific lipids and proteins reflecting their cellular origin. At these locations, proteins, lipids, and nucleic acids are selectively incorporated into microvesicles and released into the surrounding environment.

Exosomes are membrane-covered vesicles, formed intracellularly are considered to be smaller than 100 nm. In contrast to microvesicles, which are formed through a process of membrane budding, or exocytosis, exosomes are initially formed by endocytosis. Exosomes are formed by invagination within a cell to create an intracellular vesicle called an endosome, or an endocytic vesicle. In general, exosomes are formed by segregating the cargo (e.g., lipids, proteins, and nucleic acids) within the endosome. Once formed, the endosome combines with a structure known as a multivesicular body (MVB). The MVB containing segregated endosomes ultimately fuses with the plasma membrane, resulting in exocytosis of the exosomes.

Once formed, both microvesicles and exosomes (collectively called extracellular vesicles) circulate in the extracellular space near the site of release, where they can be taken up by other cells or gradually deteriorate. In addition, some vesicles migrate significant distances by diffusion, ultimately appearing in biological fluids such as cerebrospinal fluid, blood, and urine.

=== Mechanism of shedding ===
There are three mechanisms which lead to release of vesicles into the extracellular space. First of these mechanisms is exocytosis from multivesicular bodies and the formation of exosomes. Another mechanism is budding of microvesicles directly from a plasma membrane. And the last one is cell death leading to apoptotic blebbing. These are all energy-requiring processes.

Under physiologic conditions, the plasma membrane of cells has an asymmetric distribution of phospholipids. aminophospholipids, phosphatidylserine, and phosphatidylethanolamine are specifically sequestered in the inner leaflet of the membrane. The transbilayer lipid distribution is under the control of three phospholipidic pumps: an inward-directed pump, or flippase; an outward-directed pump, or floppase; and a lipid scramblase, responsible for non-specific redistribution of lipids across the membrane.

After cell stimulation, including apoptosis, a subsequent cytosolic Ca^{2+} increase promotes the loss of phospholipid asymmetry of the plasma membrane, subsequent phosphatidylserine exposure, and a transient phospholipidic imbalance between the external leaflet at the expense of the inner leaflet, leading to budding of the plasma membrane and microvesicle release.

=== Molecular contents ===
The lipid and protein content of microvesicles has been analyzed using various biochemical techniques. Microvesicles display a spectrum of enclosed molecules enclosed within the vesicles and their plasma membranes. Both the membrane molecular pattern and the internal contents of the vesicle depend on the cellular origin and the molecular processes triggering their formation. Because microvesicles are not intact cells, they do not contain mitochondria, Golgi, endoplasmic reticulum, or a nucleus with its associated DNA.

Microvesicle membranes consist mainly of membrane lipids and membrane proteins. Regardless of their cell type of origin, nearly all microvesicles contain proteins involved in membrane transport and fusion. They are surrounded by a phospholipid bilayer composed of several different lipid molecules. The protein content of each microvesicle reflects the origin of the cell from which it was released. For example, those released from antigen-presenting cells (APCs), such as B cells and dendritic cells, are enriched in proteins necessary for adaptive immunity, while microvesicles released from tumors contain proapoptotic molecules and oncogenic receptors (e.g. EGFR).

In addition to the proteins specific to the cell type of origin, some proteins are common to most microvesicles. For example, nearly all contain the cytoplasmic proteins tubulin, actin and actin-binding proteins, as well as many proteins involved in signal transduction, cell structure and motility, and transcription. Most microvesicles contain the so-called "heat-shock proteins" hsp70 and hsp90, which can facilitate interactions with cells of the immune system. Finally, tetraspanin proteins, including CD9, CD37, CD63 and CD81 are one of the most abundant protein families found in microvesicle membranes. Many of these proteins may be involved in the sorting and selection of specific cargos to be loaded into the lumen of the microvesicle or its membrane.

Other than lipids and proteins, microvesicles are enriched with nucleic acids including messenger RNA (mRNA) and microRNA (miRNA). The identification of RNA molecules in microvesicles supports the hypothesis that they are a biological vehicle for the transfer of nucleic acids and subsequently modulate the target cell's protein synthesis. Messenger RNA transported from one cell to another through microvesicles can be translated into proteins, conferring new function to the target cell. The discovery that microvesicles may shuttle specific mRNA and miRNA suggests that this may be a new mechanism of genetic exchange between cells. Exosomes produced by cells exposed to oxidative stress can mediate protective signals, reducing oxidative stress in recipient cells, a process which is proposed to depend on exosomal RNA transfer. These RNAs are specifically targeted to microvesicles, in some cases containing detectable levels of RNA that is not found in significant amounts in the donor cell.

Because the specific proteins, mRNAs, and miRNAs in microvesicles are highly variable, it is likely that these molecules are specifically packaged into vesicles using an active sorting mechanism. At this point, it is unclear exactly which mechanisms are involved in packaging soluble proteins and nucleic acids into microvesicles.

== Role on target cells ==
Once released from their cell of origin, microvesicles interact specifically with cells they recognize by binding to cell-type specific, membrane-bound receptors. Because microvesicles contain a variety of surface molecules, they provide a mechanism for engaging different cell receptors and exchanging material between cells. This interaction ultimately leads to fusion with the target cell and release of the vesicles' components, thereby transferring bioactive molecules, lipids, genetic material, and proteins. The transfer of microvesicle components includes specific mRNAs and proteins, contributing to the proteomic properties of target cells. microvesicles can also transfer miRNAs that are known to regulate gene expression by altering mRNA turnover.

=== Mechanisms of signaling ===
==== Degradation ====
In some cases, the degradation of microvesicles is necessary for the release of signaling molecules. During microvesicle production, the cell can concentrate and sort the signaling molecules which are released into the extracellular space upon microvesicle degradation. Dendritic cells, macrophage and microglia derived microvesicles contain proinflammatory cytokines and neurons and endothelial cells release growth factors using this mechanism of release.

==== Fusion ====
Proteins on the surface of the microvesicle will interact with specific molecules, such as integrin, on the surface of its target cell. Upon binding, the microvesicle can fuse with the plasma membrane. This results in the delivery of nucleotides and soluble proteins into the cytosol of the target cell as well as the integration of lipids and membrane proteins into its plasma membrane.

==== Internalization ====
Microvesicles can be endocytosed upon binding to their targets, allowing for additional steps of regulation by the target cell. The microvesicle may fuse, integrating lipids and membrane proteins into the endosome while releasing its contents into the cytoplasm. Alternatively, the endosome may mature into a lysosome causing the degradation of the microvesicle and its contents, in which case the signal is ignored.

===== Transcytosis =====
After internalization of microvesicle via endocytosis, the endosome may move across the cell and fuse with the plasma membrane, a process called transcytosis. This results in the ejection of the microvesicle back into the extracellular space or may result in the transportation of the microvesicle into a neighboring cell. This mechanism might explain the ability of microvesicle to cross biological barriers, such as the blood brain barrier, by moving from cell to cell.

==== Contact dependent signaling ====
In this form of signaling, the microvesicle does not fuse with the plasma membrane or engulfed by the target cell. Similar to the other mechanisms of signaling, the microvesicle has molecules on its surface that will interact specifically with its target cell. There are additional surface molecules, however, that can interact with receptor molecules which will interact with various signaling pathways. This mechanism of action can be used in processes such as antigen presentation, where major histocompatibility complex (MHC) molecules on the surface of microvesicle can stimulate an immune response. Alternatively, there may be molecules on microvesicle surfaces that can recruit other proteins to form extracellular protein complexes that may be involved in signaling to the target cell.

== Relevance in disease ==
=== Cancer ===
==== Promoting aggressive tumor phenotypes ====
The oncogenic receptor ECGFvIII, which is located in a specific type of aggressive glioma tumor, can be transferred to a non-aggressive population of tumor cells via microvesicles. After the oncogenic protein is transferred, the recipient cells become transformed and show characteristic changes in the expression levels of target genes. It is possible that transfer of other mutant oncogenes, such as HER2, may be a general mechanism by which malignant cells cause cancer growth at distant sites. Microvesicles from non-cancer cells can signal to cancer cells to become more aggressive. Upon exposure to microvesicles from tumor-associated macrophages, breast cancer cells become more invasive in vitro.

==== Promoting angiogenesis ====
Angiogenesis, which is essential for tumor survival and growth, occurs when endothelial cells proliferate to create a matrix of blood vessels that infiltrate the tumor, supplying the nutrients and oxygen necessary for tumor growth. A number of reports have demonstrated that tumor-associated microvesicles release proangiogenic factors that promote endothelial cell proliferation, angiogenesis, and tumor growth. Microvesicles shed by tumor cells and taken up by endothelial cells also facilitate angiogenic effects by transferring specific mRNAs and miRNAs.

==== Involvement in multidrug resistance ====
When anticancer drugs such as doxorubicin accumulate in microvesicles, the drug's cellular levels decrease. This can ultimately contribute to the process of drug resistance. Similar processes have been demonstrated in microvesicles released from cisplatin-insensitive cancer cells. Vesicles from these tumors contained nearly three times more cisplatin than those released from cisplatin-sensitive cells. For example, tumor cells can accumulate drugs into microvesicles. Subsequently, the drug-containing microvesicles are released from the cell into the extracellular environment, thereby mediating resistance to chemotherapeutic agents and resulting in significantly increased tumor growth, survival, and metastasis.

==== Interference with antitumor immunity ====
Microvesicles from various tumor types can express specific cell-surface molecules (e.g. FasL or CD95) that induce T-cell apoptosis and reduce the effectiveness of other immune cells. microvesicles released from lymphoblastoma cells express the immune-suppressing protein latent membrane protein-1 (LMP1), which inhibits T-cell proliferation and prevents the removal of circulating tumor cells (CTCs). As a consequence, tumor cells can turn off T-cell responses or eliminate the antitumor immune cells altogether by releasing microvesicles. the combined use of microvesicles and 5-FU resulted in enhanced chemosensitivity of squamous cell carcinoma cells more than the use of either 5-FU or microvesicle alone

==== Impact on tumor metastasis ====
Degradation of the extracellular matrix is a critical step in promoting tumor growth and metastasis. Tumor-derived microvesicles often carry protein-degrading enzymes, including matrix metalloproteinase 2 (MMP-2), MMP-9, and urokinase-type plasminogen activator (uPA). By releasing these proteases, tumor cells can degrade the extracellular matrix and invade surrounding tissues. Likewise, inhibiting MMP-2, MMP-9, and uPA prevents microvesicles from facilitating tumor metastasis. Matrix digestion can also facilitate angiogenesis, which is important for tumor growth and is induced by the horizontal transfer of RNAs from microvesicles.

==== Cellular Origin of Microvesicles ====
The release of microvesicles has been shown from endothelial cells, vascular smooth muscle cells, platelets, white blood cells (e.g. leukocytes and lymphocytes), and red blood cells. Although some of these microvesicle populations occur in the blood of healthy individuals and patients, there are obvious changes in number, cellular origin, and composition in various disease states. It has become clear that microvesicles play important roles in regulating the cellular processes that lead to disease pathogenesis. Moreover, because microvesicles are released following apoptosis or cell activation, they have the potential to induce or amplify disease processes. Some of the inflammatory and pathological conditions that microvesicles are involved in include cardiovascular disease, hypertension, neurodegenerative disorders, diabetes, and rheumatic diseases.

=== Cardiovascular disease ===
Microvesicles are involved in cardiovascular disease initiation and progression. Microparticles derived from monocytes aggravate atherosclerosis by modulating inflammatory cells. Additionally, microvesicles can induce clotting by binding to clotting factors or by inducing the expression of clotting factors in other cells. Circulating microvesicles isolated from cardiac surgery patients were found to be thrombogenic in both in vitro assays and in rats. Microvesicles isolated from healthy individuals did not have the same effects and may actually have a role in reducing clotting. Tissue factor, an initiator of coagulation, is found in high levels within microvesicles, indicating their role in clotting. Renal mesangial cells exposed to high glucose media release microvesicles containing tissue factor, having an angiogenic effect on endothelial cells.

=== Inflammation ===
Microvesicles contain cytokines that can induce inflammation via numerous different pathways. These cells will then release more microvesicles, which have an additive effect. This can call neutrophils and leukocytes to the area, resulting in the aggregation of cells. However, microvesicles also seem to be involved in a normal physiological response to disease, as there are increased levels of microvesicles that result from pathology.

=== Neurological disorders ===
Microvesicles seem to be involved in a number of neurological diseases. Since they are involved in numerous vascular diseases and inflammation, strokes and multiple sclerosis seem to be other diseases for which microvesicles are involved. Circulating microvesicles seem to have an increased level of phosphorylated tau proteins during early stage Alzheimer's disease. Similarly, increased levels of CD133 are an indicator of epilepsy.

== Clinical applications ==
=== Detection of cancer ===
Tumor-associated microvesicles are abundant in the blood, urine, and other body fluids of patients with cancer, and are likely involved in tumor progression. They offer a unique opportunity to noninvasively access the wealth of biological information related to their cells of origin. The quantity and molecular composition of microvesicles released from malignant cells varies considerably compared with those released from normal cells. Thus, the concentration of plasma microvesicles with molecular markers indicative of the disease state may be used as an informative blood-based biosignature for cancer. Microvesicles express many membrane-bound proteins, some of which can be used as tumor biomarkers. Several tumor markers accessible as proteins in blood or urine have been used to screen and diagnose various types of cancer. In general, tumor markers are produced either by the tumor itself or by the body in response to the presence of cancer or some inflammatory conditions. If a tumor marker level is higher than normal, the patient is examined more closely to look for cancer or other conditions. For example, CA19-9, CA-125, and CEA have been used to help diagnose pancreatic, ovarian, and gastrointestinal malignancies, respectively. However, although they have proven clinical utility, none of these tumor markers are highly sensitive or specific. Clinical research data suggest that tumor-specific markers exposed on microvesicles are useful as a clinical tool to diagnose and monitor disease. Research is also ongoing to determine if tumor-specific markers exposed on microvesicles are predictive for therapeutic response.

Evidence produced by independent research groups has demonstrated that microvesicles from the cells of healthy tissues, or selected miRNAs from these microvesicles, can be employed to reverse many tumors in pre-clinical cancer models, and may be used in combination with chemotherapy.

Conversely, microvesicles processed from a tumor cell are involved in the transport of cancer proteins and in delivering microRNA to the surrounding healthy tissue. It leads to a change of healthy cell phenotype and creates a tumor-friendly environment. Microvesicles play an important role in tumor angiogenesis and in the degradation of matrix due to the presence of metalloproteases, which facilitate metastasis. They are also involved in intensification of the function of regulatory T-lymphocytes and in the induction of apoptosis of cytotoxic T-lymphocytes, because microvesicles released from a tumor cell contain Fas ligand and TRAIL. They prevent differentiation of monocytes to dendritic cells.

Tumor microvesicles also carry tumor antigen, so they can be an instrument for developing tumor vaccines. Circulating miRNA and segments of DNA in all body fluids can be potential markers for tumor diagnostics.

=== Microvesicles and Rheumatoid arthritis ===
Rheumatoid arthritis is a chronic systemic autoimmune disease characterized by inflammation of joints. In the early stage there are abundant Th17 cells producing proinflammatory cytokines IL-17A, IL-17F, TNF, IL-21, and IL-22 in the synovial fluid. regulatory T-lymphocytes have a limited capability to control these cells. In the late stage, the extent of inflammation correlates with numbers of activated macrophages that contribute to joint inflammation and bone and cartilage destruction, because they have the ability to transform themselves into osteoclasts that destroy bone tissue. Synthesis of reactive oxygen species, proteases, and prostaglandins by neutrophils is increased. Activation of platelets via collagen receptor GPVI stimulates the release of microvesicles from platelet cytoplasmic membranes. These microparticles are detectable at a high level in synovial fluid, and they promote joint inflammation by transporting proinflammatory cytokine IL-1.

=== Biological markers for disease ===
In addition to detecting cancer, it is possible to use microvesicles as biological markers to give prognoses for various diseases. Many types of neurological diseases are associated with increased level of specific types of circulating microvesicles. For example, elevated levels of phosphorylated tau proteins can be used to diagnose patients in early stages of Alzheimer's. Additionally, it is possible to detect increased levels of CD133 in microvesicles of patients with epilepsy.

=== Mechanism for drug delivery ===
Circulating microvesicles may be useful for the delivery of drugs to very specific targets. Using electroporation or centrifugation to insert drugs into microvesicles targeting specific cells, it is possible to target the drug very efficiently. This targeting can help by reducing necessary doses as well as prevent off-target side effects. They can target anti-inflammatory drugs to specific tissues. Additionally, circulating microvesicles can bypass the blood–brain barrier and deliver their cargo to neurons while not having an effect on muscle cells. The blood-brain barrier is typically a difficult obstacle to overcome when designing drugs, and microvesicles may be a means of overcoming it. Current research is looking into efficiently creating microvesicles synthetically, or isolating them from patient or engineered cell lines.

Microvesicles used in therapeutic genome editing approaches are sometimes called a "gesicle", especially if used to package/deliver the Cas9 RNP complex.

== See also ==
- International Society for Extracellular Vesicles
- Journal of Extracellular Vesicles
- Exocytosis
- Membrane vesicle trafficking
