= Extracellular vesicle =

Vesicles found outside cells

Extracellular vesicles (EVs) are lipid bilayer-delimited particles that are naturally released from almost all types of cells. EVs range in diameter from near the size of the smallest physically possible unilamellar liposome (around 20–30 nanometers) to as large as 10 microns or more, although the vast majority of EVs are smaller than 200 nm. EVs can be divided according to size and synthesis route into exosomes, microvesicles and apoptotic bodies. The composition of EVs varies depending on their parent cells, encompassing proteins (e.g., adhesion molecules, cytoskeletons, cytokines, ribosomal proteins, growth factors, and metabolic enzymes), lipids (including cholesterol, lipid rafts, and ceramides), nucleic acids (such as DNA, mRNA, and miRNA), metabolites, and even organelles. Most cells that have been studied to date are thought to release EVs, including some archaeal, bacterial, fungal, and plant cells that are surrounded by cell walls. A wide variety of EV subtypes have been proposed, defined variously by size, biogenesis pathway, cargo, cellular source, and function, leading to a historically heterogenous nomenclature including terms like exosomes and ectosomes.

Numerous functions of EVs have been established or postulated. The first evidence for the existence of EVs was enabled by the ultracentrifuge, the electron microscope, and functional studies of coagulation in the mid-20th century. A sharp increase in interest in EVs occurred in the first decade of the 21st century following the discovery that EVs could transfer nucleic acids such as RNA from cell to cell. Associated with EVs from certain cells or tissues, nucleic acids could be easily amplified as markers of disease and also potentially traced back to a cell of origin, such as a tumor cell. When EVs are taken up by other cells, they may alter the behaviour of the recipient cell, for instance EVs released by colorectal cancer cells increase migration of fibroblasts and thus EVs are of importance in forming tumour landscapes. This discovery also implied that EVs could be used for therapeutic purposes, such as delivering nucleic acids or other cargo to diseased tissue. Conversely, pharmacological inhibition of EV release, through Calix[6]arene, can slow down progression of experimental pancreatic cancer. The growing interest in EVs as a nexus for therapeutic intervention was paralleled by formation of companies and funding programs focused on development of EVs as biomarkers or therapies of disease, the founding of an International Society for Extracellular Vesicles (ISEV), and establishment of a scientific journal devoted to the field, the Journal of Extracellular Vesicles.

== History ==
Evidence for the existence of EVs and their functions was first gathered by combined applications of ultracentrifugation, electron microscopy, and functional studies during the mid-20th century. Ultracentrifuged pellets from blood plasma were reported to have procoagulant properties by Erwin Chargaff and Randolph West in 1946. The platelet derivation and lipid-containing nature of these particles was further articulated by Peter Wolf. Around the same time, H. Clarke Anderson and Ermanno Bonucci separately described the calcifying properties of EVs in bone matrix.

Although the extracellular and vesicular properties of EVs had been recognized by numerous groups by the 1970s, the term "extracellular vesicle" was first used in a manuscript title in 1971. This electron microscopy study of the flagellate freshwater alga Ochromonas danica reported release of EVs from membranes including those of flagella. Soon thereafter, EVs were seen to be released from follicular thyroid cells of the bat Myotis lucifugus during arousal from hibernation, suggesting the possible involvement of EVs in endocrine processes. Reports of EVs in intestinal villi samples and, for the first time, in material from human cancer (adenoma) referred back to even earlier publications that furnished similar evidence, although conclusions about EV release had not then been drawn. EVs were also described in bovine serum and cell culture conditioned medium with distinctions made between "vesicles of the multivesicular body" and "microvesicles." These studies further noted the similarities of EVs and enveloped viruses.

In the early- to mid-1980s, the Stahl and Johnstone labs forged a deeper understanding of the release of EVs from reticulocytes, while progress was also made on EVs shed from tumor cells. The reticulocyte research, in particular, showed that EVs could be released not only from the plasma membrane or surface of the cell, but also by fusion of the multivesicular body with the plasma membrane. During this time, EVs were described by many names, sometimes in the same manuscript, such as "shedding vesicles," "membrane fragments," "plasma membrane vesicles," "micro-vesicles/microvesicles," "exosomes," (previously used for mobile, transforming DNA elements in model organisms Drosophila and Neurospora), "inclusion vesicles," and more, or referred to by organ of origin, such as "prostasomes" that were found to enhance sperm motility in semen.

The involvement of EVs in immune responses became increasingly clear in the 1990s with findings of the group of Graça Raposo and others. A clinical trial of dendritic cell-derived EVs was performed in France just before the turn of the century. Cells of the immune system were found capable of transferring transmembrane proteins via EVs. For example, the HIV co-receptors CCR5 and CXCR4 could be transferred from an HIV-susceptible cell to a refractory cell by "microparticles," rendering the recipient cell susceptible to infection.

Beginning in 2006, several laboratories reported that EVs contain nucleic acids and have the ability to transfer them from cell to cell. Nucleic acids including DNAs and RNAs were even found to be functional in the recipient cell. Whether carrying DNA, RNA, surface molecules, or other factors, the involvement of EVs in cancer progression aroused considerable interest, leading to hypotheses that specific EVs could target specific cells due to "codes" displayed on their surface; create or enhance a metastatic niche; betray the presence of specific cancers; or be used as a therapy to target cancer cells. Meanwhile, strides were made in the understanding of vesicle biogenesis and subtypes.

Rapid growth of the EV research community in the early 2000s led to the creation of the International Society for Extracellular Vesicles (ISEV), which has led efforts for rigor and standardization in the field including establishment of the Journal of Extracellular Vesicles. A plethora of national and regional EV societies have also been formed. In 2012, the Director's Office of the US National Institutes of Health (NIH) announced a program for funding of EV and extracellular RNA studies, the Extracellular RNA Communication Consortium (ERCC), which subsequently invested >USD 100 million in EV research. A second round of funding was announced in 2018. Commercial investment in EV diagnostics and therapeutics also grew during this time.

== Biogenesis ==
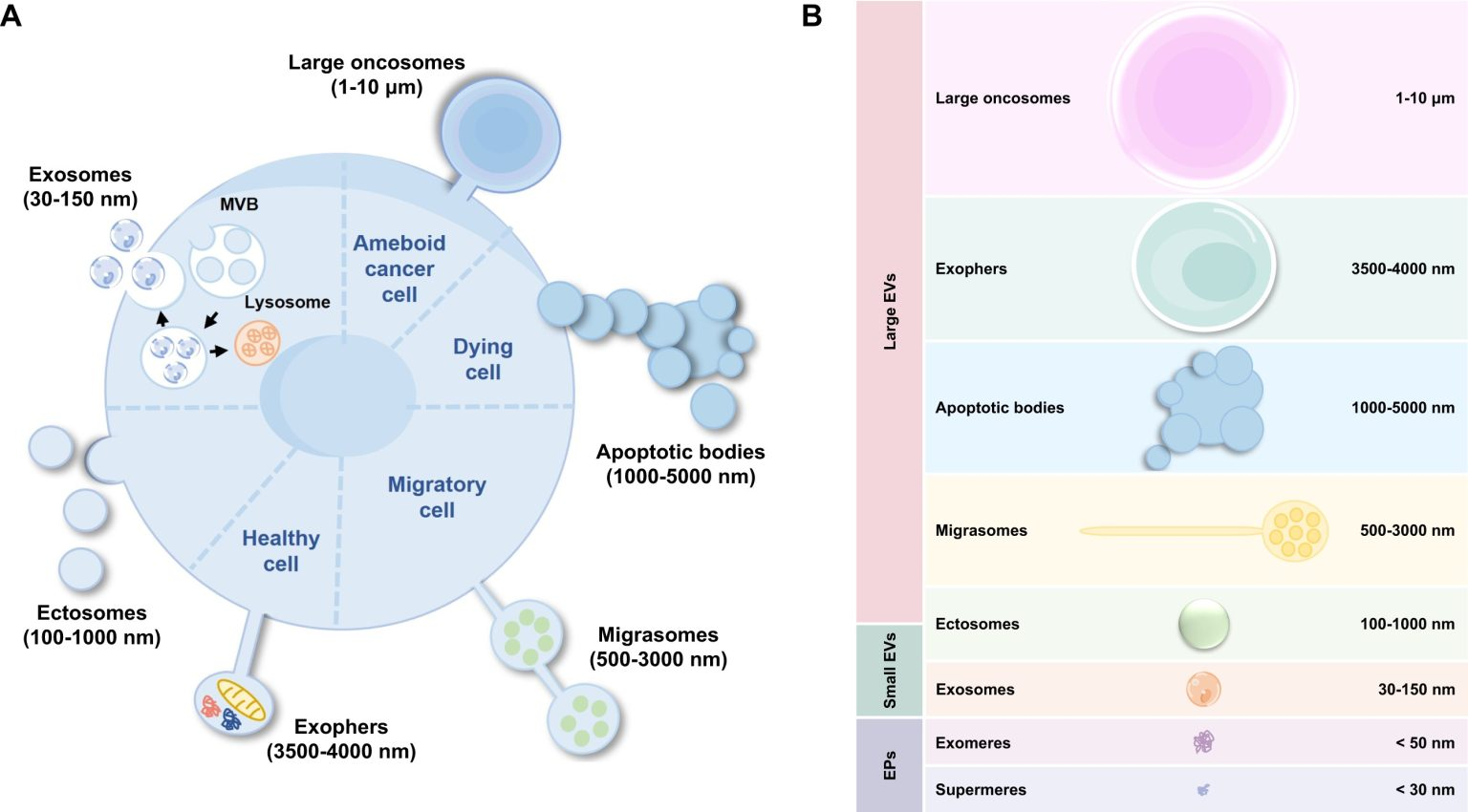
Extracellular vesicles depicted by size and origin

Extracellular vesicles and particles (EVPs) are released by cells in different shapes and sizes. Diverse EV subtypes have been proposed, with names such as ectosomes, microvesicles, microparticles, exosomes, oncosomes, apoptotic bodies, and more. These EV subtypes have been defined by various, often overlapping, definitions, based mostly on biogenesis (cell pathway, cell or tissue identity, condition of origin). However, EV subtypes may also be defined by size, constituent molecules, function, or method of separation. Because of the bewildering and sometimes contradictory definitions of different EV subtypes, the current scientific consensus is that "extracellular vesicle" and variations thereon are the preferred nomenclature unless specific biogenetic origin can be demonstrated. Subtypes of EVs may be defined by:

"a) physical characteristics of EVs, such as size ("small EVs" (sEVs) and "medium/large EVs" (m/lEVs), with ranges defined, for instance, respectively, <100nm or <200nm [small], or >200nm [large and/or medium]) or density (low, middle, high, with each range defined); b) biochemical composition (CD63+/CD81+- EVs, Annexin A5-stained EVs, etc.); or c) descriptions of conditions or cell of origin (podocyte EVs, hypoxic EVs, large oncosomes, apoptotic bodies)."

=== Plasma membrane origin ===
The terms "ectosome," "microvesicle" (MV), and "microparticle" (MP) refer to particles released from the surface of cells. Technically, the platelets of certain vertebrates (which bud from megakaryocytes), as well as red blood cells (e.g., of adult humans) also fulfill the consensus definition of EVs. Especially in the field of platelet research, MP has been the standard nomenclature. Formation of ectosomes may in some cases result from directed processes, and in others from shear forces or adherence of the MP to a surface.

=== Endosomal origin ===
Exosome biogenesis begins with pinching off of endosomal invaginations into the multivesicular body (MVB), forming intraluminal vesicles (ILVs). If the MVB fuses with the plasma membrane, the ILVs are released as "exosomes." The first publication to use the term "exosome" for EVs presented it as a synonym for "micro-vesicle." The term has also been used for EVs within specific size ranges, EVs separated using specific methods, or even all EVs.

=== Apoptotic bodies ===
Apoptotic bodies are EVs that are released by dying cells undergoing apoptosis (programmed cell death). Since apoptotic cells tend to display phosphatidylserine (PS) in the outer bilayer of the cell membrane, apoptotic bodies tend to externalize PS, although other EVs may also do so. Apoptotic bodies may be quite large (microns in diameter) but may also measure in the submicron range. Apoptotic bodies are used to sequester mitochondria containing Reactive Oxygen Species (ROS) and to signal for phagocytosis and destruction of proteins via lysosomal digestion.

=== Large oncosomes ===
In addition to the very large EVs released during apoptosis, micron-sized EVs may be produced by cancer cells, neurons, and other cells. When produced by cancer cells, these particles are termed "large oncosomes" and may reach 20 microns or more in diameter. Large oncosomes can attain sizes comparable to individual cells, but they do not contain full nuclei. They have been shown to contribute to metastasis in a mouse model and a human fibroblast cell culture model of prostate cancer. Cellular internalization of large oncosomes can reprogram non-neoplastic brain cells to divide and migrate in primary tissue culture, and higher numbers of large oncosomes isolated from blood samples from glioblastoma patients were correlated with more advanced disease progression.

=== Exophers ===
Exophers are a class of large EV, approximately four microns in diameter, observed in model organisms ranging from Caenorhabditis elegans to mice. When genetically modified to express aggregating proteins, neurons were observed to sequester the aggregates into a portion of the cell and release them within a large EV called an exopher. They are hypothesized to be a mechanism for disposal of unwanted cellular material including protein aggregates and damaged organelles. Exophers can remain connected to the cell body by a thin, membranous filament resembling a tunneling nanotube.

=== Migrasomes ===
Migrasomes are large membrane-bound EVs, ranging from 0.5 to 3 microns in diameter, that form at the ends of retraction fibers left behind when cells migrate in a process termed "migracytosis." Migrasomes can continue to fill with cytosol and expand even as the originating cell moves away. Migrasomes were first observed in rat kidney cell culture, but they are produced by mouse and human cells as well. Damaged mitochondria can be expelled from migrating cells inside of migrasomes, suggesting a functional role for this EV in mitochondrial homeostasis. Migrasomes can act as signaling mechanisms for migratory cells through the release of cytokines. Migrasomes remain partially attached to the parent cell and create a type of extracellular nervous system for migratory cells allowing for them to locate targets for cell activity. Migrasomes also have roles in transporting various types of RNA and regulating blood clotting.

=== Blebbisomes ===
Blebbisomes are large organelle-rich extracellular vesicles with an average diameter of 10 µm that can be as large as 20 µm. They typically do not have a cell nucleus. They contain mitochondria, distinguishing them from other large EVs like exophers and migrasomes.

=== Enveloped viruses ===
Enveloped viruses are a type of EV produced under the influence of viral infection. That is, the virion is composed of cellular membranes but contains proteins and nucleic acids produced from the viral genome. Some enveloped viruses can infect other cells even without a functional virion, when genomic material is transferred via EVs. Certain non-enveloped viruses may also reproduce with assistance from EVs.

== Isolation ==
Studying EVs and their cargo typically requires separation from a biological matrix (such as a complex fluid or tissue) so that the uniquely EV components can be analyzed. Many approaches have been used, including differential ultracentrifugation, density gradient ultracentrifugation, size exclusion chromatography, ultrafiltration, capillary electrophoresis, asymmetric-flow field-flow fractionation, and affinity/immunoaffinity capture methods. Each method has its own recovery and purity outcomes: that is, what percentage of input EVs are obtained, and the ratio of "true" EV components to co-isolates. EV separation can also be influenced by pre-analytical variables. Combining different isolation techniques increases the reliability of extracellular vesicle isolations.

== Characterization ==
=== Population-level EV analysis ===
Separated or concentrated populations of EVs may be characterized by several means. Total concentration of molecules in categories such as protein, lipid or nucleic acid. Total particle counts in a preparation can also be estimated, for example by light-scattering techniques. Each measurement technology may have a specific size range for accurate quantitation, and very small EVs (<100 nm diameter) are not detected by many technologies. Molecular "fingerprints" of populations can be obtained by "omics" technologies like proteomics, lipidomics, and RNomics, or by techniques like Raman spectroscopy. Overall levels of unique molecules can also be measured in the population, such as tetraspanins, phosphatidylserine, or species of RNA. It has been proposed that purity of an EV preparation can be estimated by examining the ratio of one population-level measurement to another, e.g., the ratio of total protein or total lipid to total particles.

=== Single-particle analysis ===
Specialized methods are needed to study EVs at the single particle level. The challenge for any putative single-particle method is to identify the individual EV as a single, lipid-bilayer particle, and to provide additional information such as size, surface proteins, or nucleic acid content. Methods that have been used successfully for single-EV analysis include optical microscopy and flow cytometry (for large EVs, usually >200 nm), tunable resistive pulse sensing for evaluating EV size, concentration and zeta potential, as well as electron microscopy (no lower bound) and immuno electron microscopy, single-particle interferometric reflectance imaging (down to about 40 nm), and nano-flow cytometry (also to 40 nm). Some technologies allow the study of individual EVs without extensive prior separation from a biological matrix: to give a few examples, electron microscopy and flow cytometry.

=== Enriched and depleted markers ===
To demonstrate the presence of EVs in a preparation, as well as the relative depletion of non-EV particles or molecules, EV-enriched 'and' -depleted markers are necessary: For example, the MISEV2018 guidelines recommend:

At least one membrane-associated marker as evidence of the lipid bilayer (e.g., a tetraspanin protein)
At least one cytoplasmic but ideally membrane-associated marker to show that the particle is not merely a membrane fragment
At least one "negative" or "depleted" marker: a "deep cellular" marker, a marker of a non-EV particle, or a soluble molecule not thought to be enriched in EVs.

Usually, but not necessarily, the EV-enriched or -depleted markers are proteins that can be detected by Western blot, flow cytometry, ELISA, mass spectrometry, or other widely-available methods. Assaying for depleted markers is thought to be particularly important, as otherwise the purity of an EV preparation cannot be claimed. However, most studies of EVs prior to 2016 did not support claims of the presence of EVs by showing enriched markers, and <5% measured the presence of possible co-isolates/contaminants. Despite the high need, a list of EV contaminants is not yet available to the EV research community. A recent study suggested density-gradient-based EV separation from biofluids as an experimental set-up to compile a list of contaminants for EV, based upon differential analysis of EV-enriched fractions versus soluble protein-enriched fractions. Soluble proteins in blood, the Tamm-Horsfall protein (uromodulin) in urine, or proteins of the nucleus, Golgi apparatus, endoplasmic reticulum, or mitochondria in eukaryotic cells. The latter proteins may be found in large EVs or indeed any EVs, but are expected to be less concentrated in the EV than in the cell.

== Function ==
A wide variety of biological functions have been ascribed to EVs.

- "Trash disposal": eliminating unwanted materials
- Transfer of functional proteins
- Transfer of functional DNA and RNA
- Molecular recycling or "nutrition"
- Signaling to the recipient cell via cell-surface or endosomal receptors
- Creation of a metastatic niche for cancer
- Pathfinding through the environment
- Quorum sensing
- Mediating host-commensal or parasite/pathogen interaction

== Clinical significance ==
=== Aging ===
EVs have been implicated in senescence. Extracellular vesicle secretion is generally believed to increase with age due to DNA or mitochondrial damage and lipid peroxidation. It has been demonstrated that exosomes released by senescent cells have a miRNA content that contributes to aging. miRNAs play an essential role in senescence by negatively regulating the suppressors of p53, for example.

Furthermore, EVs play a role in overall chronic inflammation. The interorgan shuttling of EVs can mean that one disease is likely to promote the advancement of another, as is the case with NAFLD and the development of atherosclerosis. EVs released from steatosis-affected hepatocytes induce the release of inflammatory molecules from endothelial cells co-cultured with them. The co-cultured cells also show increased NF-κB activity. It has thus been demonstrated that EVs released by hepatocytes under NAFLD conditions cause vascular endothelial inflammation and promote atherosclerosis.

EVs also have senolytic potential. EVs harvested from cardio-sphere-derived cells in young rats have been shown to reverse senescent processes in aged rats. The older rats' endurance and cardiovascular function improved when they received a transfusion of EVs from younger animals. It is therefore believed that EVs hold promise as an anti-aging treatment in humans.

=== Coagulation ===
Studies indicate that EVs may have a procoagulant effect in various diseases. EVs can express phosphatidylserine (PS) on their surface. PS is an anionic phospholipid and PS+ EVs therefore provide a negatively charged surface which may facilitate formation of coagulation complexes. Under pathological conditions, EVs can sometimes express tissue factor (TF). TF is the most potent initiator of the coagulation cascade and is under normal conditions mainly contained to subvascular tissue.

=== Disease ===
EVs are believed to play a role in the spreading of different diseases. Studies have shown that tumor cells send EVs to send signal to target resident cells, which can lead to tumor invasion and metastasis. In vitro studies of Alzheimer's disease have shown that astrocytes that accumulate amyloid beta release EVs that cause neuronal apoptosis. The content of the EVs was also affected by the exposure to amyloid beta and higher ApoE was found in EVs secreted by astrocyte exposed to amyloid beta. An oncogenic mechanism illustrates how extracellular vesicles are produced by proliferative acute lymphoblastic leukemia cells and can target and compromise a healthy hematopoiesis system during leukemia development.

=== T cell longevity ===
The fate of T cells can be determined by the transfer of telomeres via EVs from antigen-presenting cells (APCs). T cells that acquire telomeres in such a manner regain stem-like characteristics, avoiding senescence. The creation of long-lived memory T cells via an EV injection of telomeres enhances long-term immunological memory.

=== As biomarkers ===
It has been suggested that EVs carrying nucleic acid cargo could serve as biomarkers for disease, especially in neurological disorders where it is difficult to assess the underlying pathology directly.

EVs facilitate communication between different parts of the central nervous system (CNS), and therefore, EVs found in the blood of neurological patients contain molecules implicated in neurodegenerative diseases. EVs carrying myeloid cargo, for example, have long been recognized as a biomarker of brain inflammation. Furthermore, nucleic acids corresponding to amyloid-beta precursor protein (APP), Aβ42, BACE1, and tau protein biomarkers were found to be associated with different neurodegenerative diseases.

Using EVs to profile RNA expression patterns could therefore help diagnose certain diseases before a patient become symptomatic. Exosome Diagnostic (Cambridge, MA, USA), for example, has a patent for detecting neurodegenerative diseases and brain injury based on the measure of RNA-s (mRNA, miRNA, siRNA, or shRNA) associated with CSF-derived EVs.

Further work has expanded the diagnostic and predictive potential of EVs beyond neurological contexts. Recent studies have demonstrated the use of EVs as minimally invasive biomarkers across disease detection and immunotherapy stratification. Serum- and tissue-derived EV profiling has been shown to capture immune–tumour communication and correlate with disease progression and prognosis. Complementary investigations have shown that EV-derived nucleic acid and protein cargo can reflect immune activation states and disease dynamics in autoimmune and hematological disorders. In a 2025 study published in Science Advances, B-cell-derived EV transcriptomic profiles were shown to predict patient response to immune checkpoint inhibitors in melanoma, providing a minimally invasive tool to optimise immunotherapy selection. These findings highlight the dual role of EVs as both diagnostic biomarkers and decision-support tools in precision immuno-oncology.
