= Yǐn (surname) =

- Yin surname in regular script
- Pronunciation: Yǐn (Pinyin)
- Language: Chinese

Origin
- Language: Chinese
- Meaning: "prefectural magistrate"

Yin (Chinese: 尹; pinyin: Yǐn; Jyutping: Wan5; Pe̍h-ōe-jī: Ún / Ín) is a Chinese surname. In 800 BCE, Bo Jifu, a renowned judge during the reign of King Xuan of Zhou, held the position of Yin (equivalent to First Minister or most favored Minister) and changed his name to Yin Jifu. During the era of the Imperial Examination System, three other magistrates took on the surname Yǐn (尹) to denote their Imperial rank and favoured status. It is the 100th name on the Hundred Family Surnames poem.

The Korean surname Yun and the Vietnamese surname Doãn are derived from Yin and traditionally written in the same Chinese character.

A 2013 study found it to be the 79th most common surname, being shared by 3,460,000 people or 0.260% of the population, with the province with the most being Hunan.

== Notable people ==
- Yin Changheng (尹昌衡; 1884–1953), Qing Dynasty military leader
- Yin Changji (尹昌吉; born 1995), Chinese footballer
- Yin Chengxin (尹成昕; born 1995), Chinese synchronized swimmer, Olympic silver medalist
- Yiin Chii-ming (尹啟銘; born 1952), Taiwanese politician
- Yin Chung-jung (尹仲容; 1903–1963), Taiwanese government official
- Yin Congyao (尹聪耀; born 1997), Chinese footballer
- Yin Depei (尹德沛; born 1991), Chinese footballer
- Yin Fu (尹福; 1840–1909), creator of the Yin Style Baguazhang, bodyguard to the Empress Dowager Cixi and personal trainer of the Emperor
- Yin Guangjun (尹广俊; born 1992), Chinese footballer
- Yin Hailin (尹海林; born 1960), Chinese former politician
- Hang Yin (尹航; born 1976), Chinese-American biochemists and professor
- Yin Hang (尹航; born 1997), Chinese race walker
- Yin Haoyu (尹浩宇; better known as Patrick Finkler; born 2003), Thai-German actor, singer, dancer, songwriter, model
- Yin Hong (尹弘; born 1963), Chinese politician
- Yin Hongbo (尹鸿博; born 1989), Chinese footballer
- Ivy Yin (尹馨; born 1978), Taiwanese actress
- Yin Jiaxu (尹家绪; born 1956), Chinese retired business executive
- Yin Jifu (尹吉甫; 826–778 BC), Zhou Dynasty government official
- Yin Junhua (尹军花; born 1990), Chinese boxer, Olympic silver medalist
- Yin Kesheng (尹克升; 1932–2011), Chinese politician
- Wan Kuok-koi (尹國駒; popularly known as Broken Tooth Koi; born 1955), former leader of the Macau branch of the 14K triad
- Wan Kwong (尹光; born 1949), Vietnamese-born Hong Kong singer
- Yin Li (尹力; born 1962), Chinese politician
- Yin Lichuan (尹丽川; born 1973), Chinese writer, poet, filmmaker
- Yin Linping (尹林平; 1908–1984), Chinese politician
- Yin Lu (尹路; born 1989), Chinese footballer
- Yin Meng (尹萌; born 1984), Chinese volleyball player
- Yin Menglu (尹梦璐; born 2002), Chinese para badminton player, Paralympic gold medalist
- Yin Mingshan (尹明善; born 1938), Chinese businessman, founder of Lifan Industrial Corporation
- Yin Mo (尹默; 200s–234), Shu Han official and Confucian scholar
- Samuel Yin (尹衍樑; born 1950), Taiwanese billionaire businessman and philanthropist
- Terence Yin (尹子維; born 1975), Hong Kong-American actor, singer, producer, media relations specialist
- Yin Weimin (尹蔚民; born 1953), Chinese politician
- Xi Yin (尹希; born 1983), Chinese-American theoretical physicist
- Yin Xiangjie (尹相杰; born 1969), Chinese singer, host, actor
- Yin Xiaolong (尹小龙; born 1985), Chinese footballer
- Wan Yeung-ming (尹揚明; born 1958), Hong Kong actor
- Yin Yue (尹约), Chinese songwriter, producer, writer, editor-in-chief
- Yin Zhe (尹哲; 1916–2005), Chinese politician
- Yin Zheng (尹正; born 1986), Chinese actor
- Yin Zhuo (尹卓; born 1945), Chinese Navy rear admiral
- Yin Zizhong (尹自重; 1909–1985), Chinese musician
- In Sip Choo (尹習之; born 1953), Malaysian Doctor
