= Jiang Luxia =

Chinese actress and martial artist

- 蒋璐霞
- Born: 25 December 1986 (age 39); Tongliao, Inner Mongolia, China
- Other names: Xiao Xia (小霞), Xia Xia (霞霞), Mao Er Bao Bei (猫耳宝贝), Kitty Jiang
- Education: Beijing Sport University, Master Degree in Physical Education
- Occupations: Actress; Internet celebrity
- Years active: 2007–present
- Known for: Chinese Martial Arts Wushu
- Notable work: Operation Red Sea

Chinese name
- Traditional Chinese: 蒋璐霞
- Simplified Chinese: 蒋璐霞
Transcriptions
Standard Mandarin
- Hanyu Pinyin: Jiǎng lù xiá

Jiang Luxia (Chinese: 蒋璐霞; pinyin: Jiǎng Lù Xiá; born 25 December 1986) is a Chinese actress and martial artist. In 2018, she won the Best Supporting Actress in Hundred Flowers Award for her role as "Tong Li, the Female Machine Gunner" in the movie Operation Red Sea. The film has grossed USD579 million, and received critical acclaim from critics, making it one of the highest-grossing Chinese films in 2018.

Jiang Luxia was the former Nationwide Wushu Champion in Shaolin "Quan" in China. Jiang also holds the status of China State "Wu Ying Level" Sportsman. The title "Wu Ying" (武英, "Martial Hero") is the highest form of addressing a Wushu athlete and is only awarded to participants that have consistently maintained the top three positions in the national competitions.

She is excellent in Martial Arts Repertoire, Practical Self-Defense, Qigong, Taijiquan, and Crossbow techniques. She was also the State Martial Arts Repertoires A-level Referee and is on the Board of the Wushu Association of Beijing Sports University.

Before becoming an actress, Jiang was a popular award-winning Internet Celebrity, actively promoting martial arts under the nickname of "Mao Er Bao Bei" (猫耳宝贝).

Jiang is one of the most recognized female action stars in the Chinese movie industry. She started her career acting in action and martial arts films, where she did most of her own stunts.

== Early life ==
=== Education ===
Jiang Luxia was born on December 25, 1986, in Tongliao City, Inner Mongolia, China. As a child, she was sporty and active and her father noticed that Jiang showed potential in martial arts due to her good physical fitness. In an interview, she explained that she aspired to be a soldier (or police) when she grew up, having been influenced by her grandmother, who gave up being a soldier to take care of the family.

She became inspired to be an actress after watching the "Tai Chi Master" (太極張三豐), a 1993 Hong Kong Martial Arts film directed by Yuen Woo-ping, starring Jet Li and Michelle Yeoh.

“小时候我就特爱看武侠片，尤其是1993版的《太极张三丰》，我看了几十遍，特希望有一天自己也能像电影里那样，又能飞又能打。”

— 蒋璐霞

“I have loved watching wuxia movies since I was a child, especially the 1993 movie "Tai Chi Master". I watched it over and over again, hoping that one day I could be like what I saw in the movie. Able to fly and fight”

— Jiang Luxia

Like most young girls, Jiang chose to learn dancing when she was 6 years old. Her teacher encouraged Jiang to pick dancing for her after-school classes. However, the dance teacher observed that Jiang's movement was too stiff and suggested that Jiang should learn martial arts instead. Jiang took that remark earnestly as she had already cultivated a passion for martial arts and becoming an actress after watching "Tai Chi Master". There, Jiang switched to learning martial arts instead of dancing.

Up until her fourth grade of elementary school, Jiang realized she could not learn much from the part-time classes. She shifted to a professional martial arts school, Dongling Shaolin Martial Arts School in Shenyang, when she was 11 years old. "At that time, the martial arts school was following the military system. It felt like becoming a soldier." Jiang enjoyed the life of being highly disciplined and obeying orders. But she outgrew the lessons quickly and decided to learn in-depth about martial arts elsewhere.

"I do not know any sect. Since I was young, I always curious about Shaolin Monastery. It felt like that is the place to learn authentic and traditional martial arts."

She attended Songshan Shaolin Temple at the age of 13. After becoming a lay Shaolin disciple, she became Shi Xiaolong's classmate, a child actor in China.

Jiang described life in Songshan Shaolin Temple as particularly difficult and challenging. "Most people can't bear the suffering. Fewer girls were studying there. Living conditions were very poor. For example, you have to go to the river to wash your clothes. There was no hot water for bathing, and there was no light in the bath. The place where we sleep was very simple, the window was glued with plastic bags and there would be air leakage under the door. I slept by the door and the winter wind was biting. The wall I lean against is frosty every year, so I can't sleep. There were frostbite on my hands and face."

There was high-intensity training every day. "Get up at 5:30 in the morning, start running at 6 o'clock for an hour and a half on mountainous roads at Bodhidharma Cave. Running on a flat road was not considered as training for us."

Jiang was a representative for various competitions but due to the prolonged intensive training for years, she slowed down due to severe back injury. Taking into account her physical conditions and future career development, she decided to pursue her study at a university. She was admitted to Beijing Sport University at 17 years old to study traditional Chinese sports in 2003.

=== Achievement ===
She became the National Champion of Shaolin Martial Arts, National Martial Arts Champion, and National First-Class Martial Arts Routine Referee in 2004. She was notable for her outstanding contributions among the female athletes in the martial arts field.

While Jiang is highly skilled in Chinese Martial Arts, she was uncertain of her future. Back in the year 2003, the employment rate was low, especially for martial arts students. It was unlikely for every graduate to have the opportunity to be an actor or athlete and some might end up working as security guards. She gathered her good friends to discuss their plans after graduation. "At that time, everyone knew that it was not easy to find a suitable job with our major. So we discussed and decided to open a joint martial arts gym to teach wushu and self-defense for girls." But they realized that the lack of popularity of martial arts would make it difficult to recruit students. They could not afford to pay for advertisements so they distributed flyers around colleges and universities, but the result was not encouraging. In desperation, they tried promoting martial arts online.

From February 2007, Jiang and her friends started shooting the series under the nickname "Mao Er Bao Bei" (猫耳宝贝 means Cat Ear Baby). Jiang was unanimously selected to be filmed performing martial arts and acrobatic stunts in the videos. The series was created with upbeat music and Jiang's performance was energetic, vigorous, and full of heroic spirit.

The "Mao Er Bao Bei" series of videos was extremely popular. The series has recorded at least a click rate of over 25 million and was being searched for over 4 million times with more than 100 million views. The record has way surpassed many of the other "web stars".

Jiang was loved by Internet fans for her healthy and positive image. Her new videos were often featured on the home pages of many video portals and websites to attract web viewers.

She won the first prize in the original works group of the first Sina Podcasting Grand Prix, the best video blog public award in the International Blog Grand Prix, and became a first-generation Internet celebrity. In November 2007, she won the "Best Video Blog Public Award" in the International Blog Awards.

Due to her popularity, Jiang was invited to the Happy Camp TV Series program, a Chinese variety show which is one of China's most popular shows, with a minimum viewership of tens of millions that features celebrities and famous figures from all over the world.

She has also served as the Chief Trainer of the "Practical Women's Self-defense Techniques" column of CCTV Sports Channel.

== Career ==
=== 2007–2017: Beginning ===
Jiang was still studying in university when her classmate approached her to work as a stand-in (stunt double) for a commercial shooting for Guo Jingjing (Chinese female diver, and multi-time Olympic gold medalist and world champion.) The crew had approached many stuntwomen for the role but many rejected it as it was too challenging. As Jiang wanted to make some pocket money, she immediately accepted the offer.

The director of the commercial, Hung Yan-yan, was the former stunt double for martial art superstar Jet Li and was renowned for playing the role "Kwai Geuk-Chat" (鬼脚七 means Clubfoot Seven) in "Once Upon a Time in China III". For the stunt, Jiang was filmed tumbling down from the height of 13 meters before falling on some cartons.

Four months later, in December 2009, Hung Yan-yan cast Jiang where she played the lead role as protagonist Nie Yiyi for the action film "Coweb" (战,无双). It was Hung Yan-yan's debut as a director starring newcomer Jiang Luxia. That movie launched Jiang's career as an actress.

The media has described Jiang as the up-and-coming young action movie star, the female version of Jackie Chan. While Jiang had sustained many injuries from the fight scenes in a tight filming schedule, the public response towards the movie was not overwhelming. The audience had lost interest in Jiang transforming from an internet celebrity to an action star.

Although Jiang embarked into the movie industry as a lead actress, she did not achieve fame and had a lack of success in showbiz. For ten years, Jiang was mostly cast for the minor or typical action-related role. She hardly received any job offer and had to accept any role available. Jiang did not want to be stereotyped as an action actress. She changed her image, keeping her hair long and hoping to receive different roles, but there was no opportunity for her.

In her interview on 15 April 2018, Jiang stated: "Once, I was chosen for a movie. To prepare for the role, I had been training for three months. Shortly before the shooting started, I was told that they decided to drop me. They wanted another actress to play my role."

=== 2018: Critical acclaim ===
In 2017, Jiang was struggling until she was contacted about the film director Dante Lam casting for the movie Operation Red Sea.

She was interviewed for the role "Tong Li", the only female in the 8-person Jiaolong Assault Team of the Marine Corps. As it is a physically taxing role, the director was looking for an actress who is physically and mentally strong to play the character. Jiang was able to impress the director with her trained figure. To be accepted for the role, Jiang agreed to the director's request to further increase her muscle mass and to cut her shoulder-length hair near to a bold bald haircut inspired by Demi Moore's role in GI Jane and Charlize Theron's role in Mad Max: Fury Road.

To portray more realistic visualization to the audience, the actors were required to wear uniforms that weighed more than 12 kg and had to carry weapons and gadgets weighted around 20 kg during filming, especially for Jiang, who had to carry the heaviest weapon due to her role as the Machine Gunner.

The filming took about 5 months in Morocco before wrapping up in China. Throughout the movie, Jiang performed most of the dangerous stunts on her own. She gained respect from her director for her dedication and commitment in acting in such a challenging role.

Jiang was highly acclaimed after the movie was released. She was nominated in various movie festivals and won many accolades, including the best-supporting actress in the Hundred Flowers Award in China. On her Hundred Flowers Award-winning speech:

“两次来佛山，第一次来拍戏，第二次就领奖了，佛山是我的福地。承蒙厚爱，得此殊荣。感谢导演，简短的谈话就定了我，让我11年的坚持有了回报。感谢爸爸妈妈，想让我有归宿，但我的电影梦还没做完。11年终于等来这个机会，我相信人生没有低谷，只有蓄势待发。”

— 蒋璐霞

“I came to Foshan twice. The first time to film, and the second time to receive the award. Foshan is my blessed place. Thank you for the love and honour. Thank you to the director for giving me the role after a brief conversation. My 11 years of persistence has finally paid off. Thanks to mom and dad who care for me, hoping I could settle down and have family, but my movie dream is not accomplished yet. I finally got this opportunity after 11 years of waiting. I believe that there is no trough in life, but preparation and readiness to take action when the opportunity arrives .”

— Jiang Luxia

=== Present ===
Apart from actively acting in some film and television series, Jiang has also participated in the successful Chinese Reality Television Show, Sisters that Make Waves (Season 2), that premiered on Mango TV on 23 January 2021. Jiang was among the 30 female celebrities over 30 years old who competed to debut in a seven-member girl group. Other high-profile celebrities in the show included Na Ying, Bibi Zhou, Rainie Yang, Cecilia Cheung, Joey Yung, and Yang Yuying.

Though Jiang has no formal background and experience in singing and dancing, she won praises for her solid performance. Jiang reached the final after the fifth round of the competition (not eliminated after voting by live audiences). Jiang received considerably high votes during the final but did not debut as a member of the group.

== Filmography ==
=== Film ===
Year	English Title	Chinese Title	Role	Remarks
2009	Coweb	战无双	Nie Yiyi	
2009	Midnight taxi	午夜出租车	Policewoman Xiao Xia	
2010	Bad Blood	灭门	Dumby	
2010	True Legend	苏乞儿	Iron Maiden	
2010	The University Days of a Dog	一只狗的大学时光	Youzi	
2010	Vampire Warriors	僵尸新战士	Aya	
2012	Naked Soldier	绝色武器	Thai Assassin	
2013	Princess and the Seven Kung Fu Masters	笑功震武林	Hong Feng	
2013	Ip Man: The Final Fight	叶问：终极一战	Li Qiong	
2014	Once Upon a Time in Shanghai	恶战	Tie Mei	
2014	Sifu vs Vampire	天师斗僵尸	Ling Xin	
2015	Magic Card	魔卡行动	Fan Su	
2017	3 Idiots in Macau	澳囧风云	Xiaoxia	Online movie
2017	God of War	荡寇风云	Xiaomu	
2017	Legend of the Naga Pearls	鲛珠传	He Ying	
2018	Operation Red Sea	红海行动	Tong Li	
2018	The Legend of Muay Thai: 9 Satra	暹罗决：九神战甲	Xiao Lan	Thai 3D animated action fantasy film. Mainland Chinese dubbed version
2019	Undercover vs. Undercover	潜行者	Teach	
2020	Double World	征途	Binu	
2025	Operation Hadal	蛟龙行动	Tong Li	
TBA	Thousand Dragon Claw	千龙爪	Tie Wushuang	
TBA	Mysterious treasure	神秘宝藏		
TBA	The top-secret mission of the Chinese soldier king	中国兵王绝密任务		
TBA	My mercenary career	我的佣兵生涯	Monster	

=== Television series ===
Year	English Title	Chinese Title	Role
2015	Miss Unlucky	乌鸦嘴妙女郎	Tie Mulan
2018	The Secret of Filial Badges	绝密孝金	Wan Xiao Jie
2022	Special Warfare Glory	特战荣耀	Guo Xiao Xiao

=== Variety show ===
- 2007 Happy Camp
- 2010 Super Trio series
- 2021 Sisters Who Make Waves (Season 2)

== Awards ==
years	Play title	Awards ceremony	Award	Category	Result
2018	Operation Red Sea	The 14th Changchun Film Festival	Golden Deer Award	Best Supporting Actress	Won
2018	Operation Red Sea	The 27th China Golden Rooster & Hundred Flowers Film Festival, Foshan 2018	Hundred Flowers Award	Best Supporting Actress	Won
2018	Operation Red Sea	Guangzhou Student Film Festival	Students' Choice Award	Favorite Supporting Actress	Nominated
2018	Operation Red Sea	Jackie Chan International Action Film Week, Shanghai	Jackie Chan Action Movie Award	Best Action Movie Actress	Won
2019	Operation Red Sea	32nd Golden Rooster Award, Xiamen	Golden Rooster Award	Best Supporting Actress	Nominated
2019	Operation Red Sea	38th Hong Kong Film Award	Hong Kong Film Award	Best Supporting Actress	Nominated
2019	Operation Red Sea	25th Huading Awards	Huading Awards	Best New Performer	Won
2019	Operation Red Sea	25th Huading Awards	Huading Awards	Best Supporting Actress in Motion Picture	Nominated
