= Guan Zhe =

Chinese singer (born 1981)

- Born: 关钰鹏; 23 April 1981 (age 45); Jilin City, Jilin, China
- Occupations: Singer, songwriter, Producer
Guan Zhe

Guan Zhe (Chinese: 关喆; pinyin: Guān Zhé; born 23 April 1981), also known as Grady Guan, is a Chinese pop singer and songwriter. He was a contestant on The Voice of China, which featured Liu Huan, Na Ying, Yang Kun and Harlem Yu as judges. In January 2016, he has been selected to be a season 4 contestant on I Am a Singer.

== Career ==
Guan Was born in 1981 in Jilin in a working-class family. He started feeling interest in music from his early childhood although he would pursue other goals before entering in the music industry. In 2002, after getting a computer programming degree in the Yanshan University, he started taking the option of starting a musical career seriously.

In 2005 started the talent show boom in China with many popular singing programmes filling the airwaves. He decided to take part in "A Type Show" which was broadcast by the Shanghai based Dragon TV. Unexpectedly, he won the contest and signed a contract with the Chinese branch of Avex Trax. After that, he was awarded in the Young Singers Grand Prix, a show which is organised every two years by CCTV.

In 2007 Guan started composing music for other Mainland Chinese singers such as Sun Yue, Na Ying and Mao Ning amongst others. Then, with his record company he started recording his first studio album entitled "Carefully" which was released in 2008. Soon after the release of his album, he composed a song that was included in the music compilation of the Beijing 2008 Summer Olympic Games.

After releasing his second studio album entitled "Forever" in 2009, he performed, one year later, in the Shanghai World Expo 2010 opening ceremony with the top finalists of the Super Boy Contest.

In 2011, to keep on boosting his career, Guan Zhe took part in the Chinese Million Star show in Taiwan. However, his breakthrough came in 2012 when he took part in the Voice of China. Thanks to his participation in that contest, his popularity experienced a rise and he released his third album which had the title of "Surrounding Story".

In 2014 he signed a contract with the Chinese branch of Warner Music, where he would record his following releases.

== Discography ==
=== Studio albums ===
- Carefully (2008)
- Forever (2009)
- Surrounding story (2012)
- Lonely (2014)
- Enough (2017)
- Mr Hat (2018)

=== Non album singles ===
- Drive your melancholy (2008) Used as a theme song in the homonymous drama.
- Light in the rainbow (2009)
- Great life (2009)
- Giving you a song (2010)
- Smile Shanghai (2010) Performed in the Expo 2010 opening ceremony with the Super Boy finalists.
- Friend (2011)
- Stablish yourself (2013)
- Bored (2013)

=== Songs for other artists ===
Sun Yue

- I love you carelessly (爱上你没道理)
- Love (爱)
- Supermom
- Moved (感动)
- A love song in my memory (记忆中的歌)
- Further away from you (超越自己)
- With You (和你在一起)
- Congratulations (恭喜恭喜)

Mao Ning

- Jade dress (金缕玉衣)
- Give love (戒爱)
- Countdown (最后的交代)
- To listen stealthily (偷听)
- Come on now
- I miss you everyday (天天都想你)
- Perfect man (完美男人)
- Did you return home? (你回家了吗)

Chu Xupeng

- My love
- Birthday present
- I can't listen to your love words
