= Mao Ning =

Mao Ning, may refer to:

- Mao Ning (singer), male, Chinese singer.
- Mao Ning (diplomat), female, Chinese diplomat, the spokesperson of Ministry of Foreign Affairs.
