= Coweb =

2009 Hong Kong film by Xiong Xin Xin

- Promotional poster
- Directed by: Xiong Xin Xin
- Written by: Chan Wing-Sun
- Produced by: Eddie Chan; Joe Ma
- Starring: Jiang Luxia; Sam Lee; Eddie Cheung
- Cinematography: Chan Chor-Keung
- Edited by: Li Kar Wing
- Production companies: Beijing Channel Pictures Company; Joy Charm Entertainment; Singing Horse Productions
- Distributed by: Kind Legend Investment Ltd. Hong Kong Film Development Fund
- Release date: 1 May 2009 (China)
- Running time: 87 minutes
- Country: Hong Kong
- Languages: Cantonese; Mandarin

Coweb (simplified Chinese: 战·无双; traditional Chinese: 戰·無雙) is a 2009 Hong Kong martial arts film directed by Xiong Xin Xin. It is Xiong Xin Xin's debut as a director. The film stars newcomer Jiang Luxia, Sam Lee, and Eddie Cheung.

== Plot ==
A martial arts instructor is recruited as a bodyguard for an extremely powerful couple. On her first day of duty, her employers are kidnapped. As she searches for the couple, she is led into the deadly world of underground fighting by cryptic messages from the kidnappers, who put her in the ring. There, her martial arts skills are tested, and she gets a few steps closer to freeing her clients. The next opponent that enters the ring will have her facing the ultimate challenge - with little hope of getting out of the ring alive.

== Cast ==
- Jiang Luxia
- Sam Lee
- Eddie Cheung
- Kane Kosugi
- Mike Möller
- Edison Chen (Guest role)
- Tseng Pei-Yu
- Power Chan
- Wanja Götz
- Eskindir Tesfay
- Courtney Wu
- Xiong Xin Xin (Brief Appearance, Club Manager)

== Production ==
The film wasn't easy to put together for Xiong Xin Xin. His film was turned down by several studios. While some approved of the script, none of them wanted to risk it with newcomer Jiang Luxia as female lead. With support from producer Joe Ma and Eddie Chan, Xiong Xin Xin formed his own studio with limited budget and resources, in order to film Coweb.

== International release ==
On 11 June 2013, Coweb was released on Region 1 DVD by Lionsgate under the title Ninja Masters. Despite the name change, there are no ninja featured in the movie. The Lionsgate release also includes a making of special feature that includes interviews with cast and crew as well as a behind the scenes look at some of the fights.
