= Huilong Township, Hubei =

Huilong Township 回龙乡
- Township
- Location in Hubei
- Coordinates: 31°58′43″N 110°38′53″E
- Country: People's Republic of China
- Province: Hubei
- Prefecture-level city: Shiyan
- County: Fang
- Village-level divisions: 7 villages
- Elevation: 624 m (2,047 ft)

Population (2010)
  - Total: 3,022
- Time zone: UTC+8 (China Standard)
- Area code: 0719

Huilong Township (simplified Chinese: 回龙乡; traditional Chinese: 回龍鄉; pinyin: Huílóng Xiāng) is a township of Fang County in northwestern Hubei province, China, located 12 kilometres (7.5 mi) southwest of the county seat and 71 km (44 mi) south of Shiyan as the crow flies. As of 2019, it has seven villages under its administration.

== Administrative Divisions ==
Villages:

- Shisan (十三村), Hongxing ('Red star village'; 红星村), Hongwei ('Red Guards village'; 红卫村), Ershi (二十村), Hongqi ('Red Flag village'; 红旗村), Heizhanggou (黑樟沟村), Guqiaogou (古桥沟村)

== Demographics ==
As of the 2010 Chinese Census, Huilong Township has a population of 3,022. In the 2000 Chinese Census, Huilong Township had a population of 4,850.

Huilong Township has a hukou population of 6,402 as of 2019, up from 6,388 in 2018.

== See also ==
- List of township-level divisions of Hubei
