= The University Days of a Dog =

- Directed by: Lu Zhengyu
- Starring: Joker Xue, Deng Zifei, Jiang Luxia, Qian Zhijun
- Release date: September 3, 2010 (China)
- Running time: 96 minutes
- Country: China
- Language: Chinese

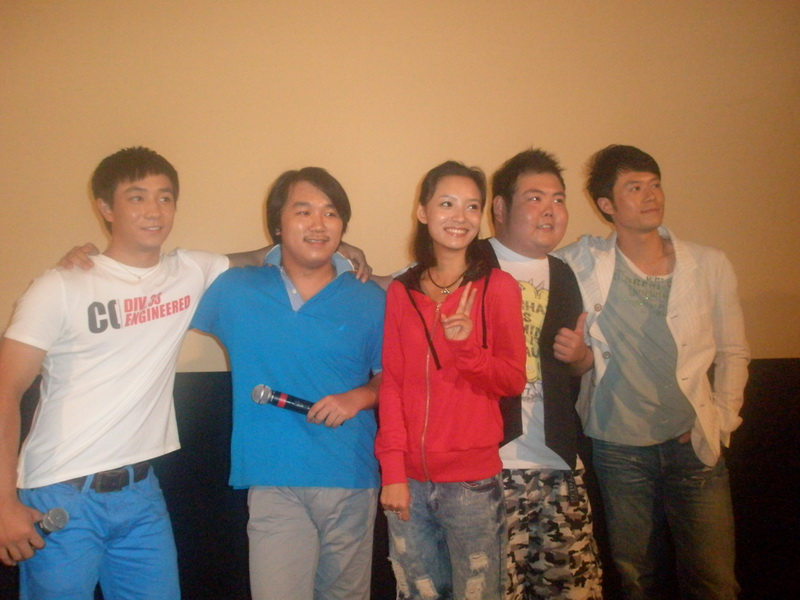
Cast members and crew of the film The University Days of a Dog – Left to right, they are Zhao Yinglong, Lu Zhengyu (director), Lin Yuan, Qian Zhijun, and Deng Zifei – Jinling Worker's Theater in Nanjing

The University Days of a Dog (一只狗的大学时光) is a 2010 Chinese comedy film. The director is Lu Zhengyu (卢正雨), and the lead actor is Joker Xue. The run time is 96 minutes. It was produced by the Beijing Shengshi Bang Wei Culture Media Co., Ltd (北京盛世邦为文化传媒有限公司).

== Production ==
The filming began on Tuesday January 26, 2010 in Beijing. The director Lu Zhengyu, and two of the main actors, Joker Xue and Lin Yuan (林源), attended a press conference that promoted the film. The filming was scheduled to conclude in February 2010, and the film was originally scheduled for release in April 2010. The companies Hewlett-Packard and Tudou sponsored the film.

== Plot ==
A Labrador retriever saves the lives of six students who are undergoing pre-university military training. The students keep the dog and name the dog "Sunny." Four years later, they are about to graduate from university when Sunny goes missing. The students go on a trip to look for the dog and rediscover themselves.

== Themes ==
The cast members stated that they intended to make a film that reflected the lifestyles of young people born in the 1980s. Lead actor Joker Xue said that people in his generation were "in the phase of struggling for a better life. They have dreams and plans for their future, although some even don't know what their lives will be. I'm right now in this very phase, so I happily received the offer right after the director invited me to join the team."

The review of the news website Da Hangzhou (大杭州 Dà Hángzhōu) said that four elements were discussed in the film: 80hòurén (80后人), or Chinese people born in the 1980s, weddings with no material foundations (no cars, dowries, receptions, rings, etc.), the second generation (i.e. fuerdai, children of entrepreneurs who made their wealth in the 1980s via the Deng Xiaoping-era reforms), and dreams.

== Distribution ==
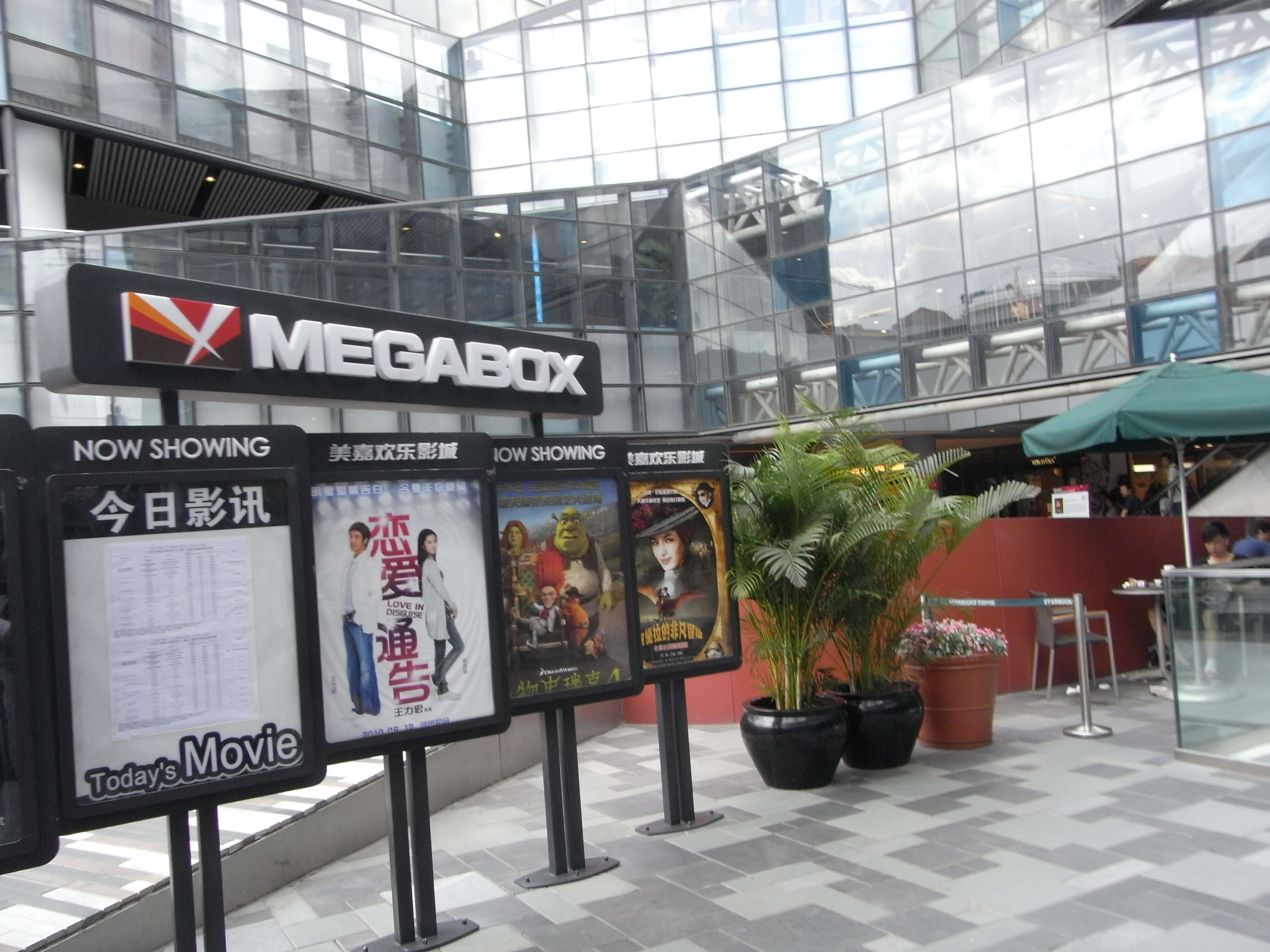
The premiere took place at the Megabox Sanlitun theater

The premiere was held in Beijing on August 12, 2010. The premiere took place at the Megabox Sanlitun theater (三里屯美嘉欢乐影城, Pinyin: Sānlǐtún Měijiāhuānlè Yǐng Chéng). It was given a national release on September 3, 2010. Around the release of the film, the film cast and crew toured around China, making official appearances. On August 31 and September 1 they visited the Shanghai Studio City (环艺影城 Huán Yì Yǐng Chéng) theater. On September 2 they visited the Nanjing Jinling Workers Cinema (金陵工人影城 Jīnlíng Gōngrén Yǐng Chéng). On September 3 they visited the Hangzhou Xinyuan International Theater (新远国际影城 Pinyin: Xīnyuǎn Guójì Yǐng Chéng) and the Hangzhou Qingchun Yintai Lumière Pavilions (庆春银泰卢米埃影城, Pinyin: Qìngchūn Yíntài Lúmǐāi Yǐng Chéng) theater. On September 4 they visited Shenzhen's Jinyi International Theater and Wuhan's Wanda International Theater, and on September 5 they visited Guangzhou. On September 11 they made an official visit in Beijing. 690 digital copies of the film were produced for theatrical distribution.

== Cast ==
The cast members consisted of people born in the 1980s who, by the time of filming in 2010, were young adults.

- Joker Xue (Qijun (齐俊, Pinyin: Qíjùn))
- Deng Zifei (Kesai (克赛, Pinyin: Kèsài))
- Jiang Luxia (Youzi (柚子 Yòuzi))
- Qian Zhijun (Jin Daxiong (金大雄 Jīn Dàxióng))
  - Daxiong is a character who is loyal, shy, and stingy. He dreams of becoming a chef in his own hotel. He argues with his father regarding promotions. The character engages in a romance with a female kindergarten teacher. QQ Entertainment News said that "the highlight of the film is his journey of self-discovery when he helps find the missing dog. This is where "spirit, spirit" originated from. The greater significance of "spirit, spirit" is that it can guide a group of depressed students into regaining confidence and realising their dreams." Despite being a son in a wealthy family, Daxiong still wants to be a cook.
  - Daxiong has several lines that are intended to be humorous. In the film, the character yells "Spirit, spirit, the spirit of manhood!" (气概，气概，男子气概！, Pinyin: Qìgài, Qìgài, Nánzǐ qìgài!) while twitching his face and making an expression intended to be humorous. As a result, the phrase became invoked on blogs and bulletin board services in Mainland China. Lu Zhengyu said that Qian's character is a crucial source of comedy, and many of the comedic scenes are centered on Daxiong.
  - This is Qian's first role in portraying romance. In regards to Qian's performance, QQ Entertainment News said "Firstly, it's the influence that Little Fatty has. Seven years ago a photograph can lead to an Internet meme. Seven years later, to put it more accurately, the more mature and better Little Fatty who acted in The University Days of a Dog is no longer the same as before. (Note: (see Lü Meng#Scholarly pursuits for the meaning of 吴下阿蒙/吳下阿蒙 Wúxià'ā Méng, which is a Chinese language saying that was used in the Chinese language quote: "首先便是小胖的影响了，七年前的一张相片可以引领一个时代，而七年后的他，准确的说是变得更成熟的他，更优秀的他，且参演《一只狗的大学时光》的他，早已不是当初那个吴下阿蒙。")) Based on this point, the phrase "spirit, spirit" coming from him, it's difficult not for him to become popular. This is because his expressions draw laughter. This is similar to Uncle Zhao's comedies."
- Lin Yuan (YOYO)
  - YOYO is Qijun's girlfriend.

== Awards ==
For his performance in the film, actor Deng Zifei won the "Cutting Edge Male Actor's Award" (S: 新锐男演员奖, Pinyin: Xīnruì Nányǎnyuán Jiǎng) from the Fifth Chinese Young Generation Film Forum (第五届华语青年影像论坛, Pinyin: Dìwǔjiè Huáyǔ Qīngnián Yǐngxiàng Lùntán) during the closing ceremony in Beijing on November 7, 2010.

== Reception ==
The QQ Entertainment News stated that despite being a low-budget film, the film became popular before its official release due to its publicity material. The article stated that the "Lu-style nonsensical comedy" and the cast members strengthened the film. An MTime reporter said that, due to the success of the first film, HP plans to increase the investment budget of the sequel to 50 million yuan.

Sina Entertainment posted a review of the film, saying that many people had sympathetic feelings towards the more tragic scenes. A review at Sohu said that the dreams of the youth do not seem to make sense.
