= Qian Zhijun =

Chinese actor and entertainer

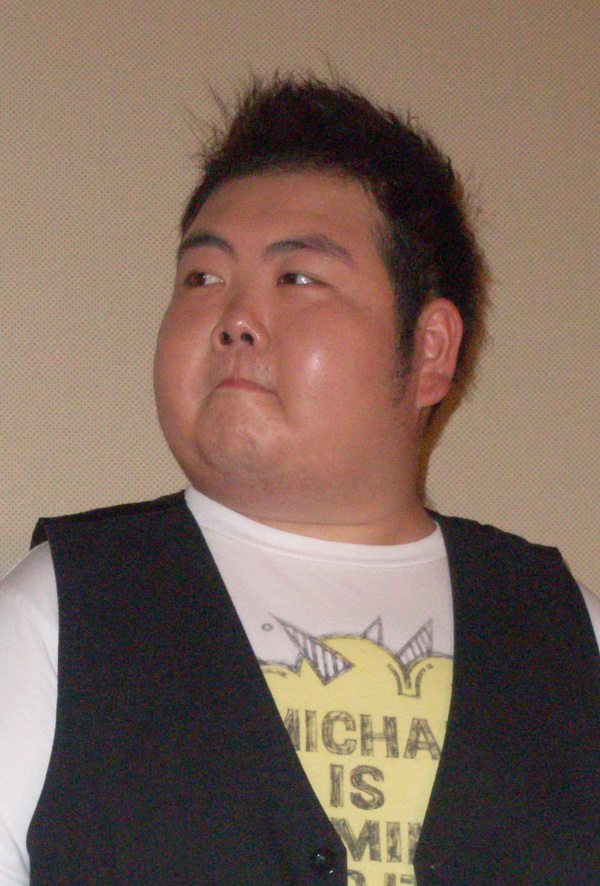
- Qian in 2010
- Born: July 15, 1987 (age 39); Jinshan District, Shanghai, China
- Occupations: Actor, entertainer
- Years active: 2003 – present

Chinese name
- Traditional Chinese: 錢志君
- Simplified Chinese: 钱志君
Transcriptions
Standard Mandarin
- Hanyu Pinyin: Qián Zhìjūn

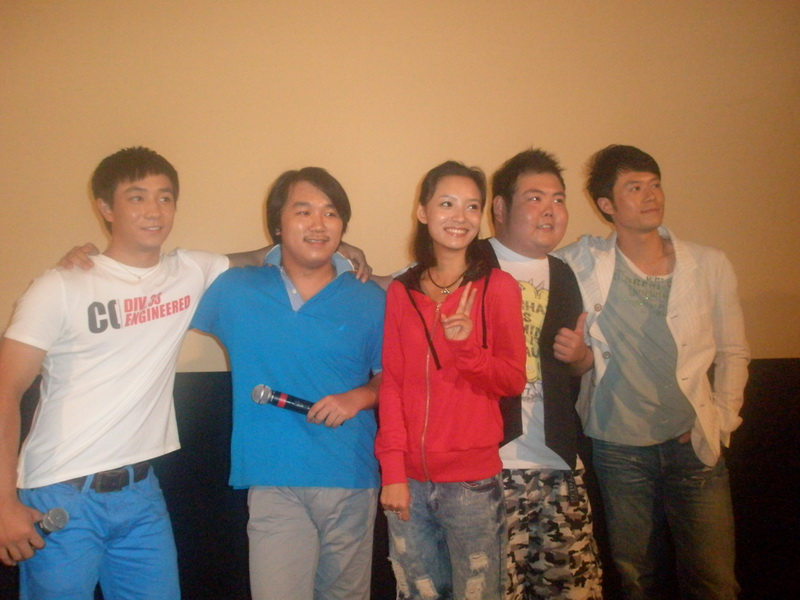
Qian Zhijun (second from right) seen with other cast and crew members of the film The University Days of a Dog in Nanjing, China

Qian Zhijun (born July 15, 1987), nicknamed "Little Fatty" (小胖 Xiǎo Pàng), is a Chinese actor and entertainer. His fame began during the "Little Fatty" internet meme, and since then he has appeared in a film and a cooking show, hosted a festival for people with alternative body types, and appeared in advertising.

== History ==
Qian is originally from Jinshan District, Shanghai. In 2003, an individual had taken a photograph of Qian at a traffic safety event. Starting in 2003, his face was superimposed onto various other images.

Qian said that he first discovered the meme when, at an internet café, a person approached Qian and asked him if he was the real "Little Fatty." Qian said that he originally felt humiliation, but "I have tried to turn sorrow into strength. At least this makes people smile and I have had quite a positive response from many surfers."

In the mid-2000s Qian worked as a gas station attendant, with a salary of 1,000 Chinese yuan (125 US$, £60 GBP, about R1,000 ZAR) per month. He weighed 100 kilograms (220 lb). By 2006, as a result of exposure from the meme, Qian had hopes about getting a career as an entertainer.

== Entertainment career ==
La Carmina of CNN said that by late 2006 Qian became "one of the most famous faces in China." Carmina added that, as a result of the internet meme, Qian "went from obscurity to movie stardom." Qian accepted an appearance to appear in Beijing on the talk show Tell The Truth. Qian was to star in Three Kingdoms: Resurrection of the Dragon, where he was supposed to play Liu Shan, the last emperor of the Shu Han. In 2007 the film script was modified due to financing issues. The Liu Shan role was altered, and Qian's planned role in the film was removed.

In 2007 New Line Cinema invited Qian to act in a film version of "Ghost Blows Out the Light." Qian also became the host of a cooking show on China Food TV. The program, Little Fatty’s Food Diary (小胖美食日记 Xiǎo Pàng Měishí Rìjì), began broadcast from a television station in Qingdao, eastern Shandong Province on January 29, 2007. The program was broadcast on Mainland Chinese television, and it also was broadcast on Sohu, one of China's major web portals.

In 2010 Qian hosted a festival celebrating people with alternative body types in Shanghai. He starred in the 2010 film The University Days of a Dog. This was his first occasion of starring as one of the main characters in a film. Qian did preparatory work before filming, and in an interview he said that he still had to learn a lot about acting.

In 2006 Qian won the New Weekly Online Person of the Year award. In May 2008, at the Global Chinese Creative Advertising Awards (全球华人广告创意功夫奖 Quánqiú Huárén Guǎnggào Chuàngyì Gōngfu Jiǎng), he was nominated for the Best Newcomer in Advertisements (最佳广告新人 Zuìjiā Guǎnggào Xīnrén) award. Qian starred in a short film, released online, called "Hip Hop Quartet" (嘻哈四重奏 Xīhā Sìchóngzòu); it was directed by Lu Zhengyu. In addition Qian also appeared in advertising for 7-Up, Apple Computer, Canon, Master Kong, Pepsi, Shanda Entertainment, SK Telecom, The9, and Tianqi toothpaste.

== Personal life ==
In July 2011 Qian was married. On July 15, 2011, which was Qian's 24th birthday, his agent, who used the Sina Weibo username "Agent Huldayan," posted their wedding photographs and stated "@ Online Little Fatty Qian Zhijun, wish you dear a happy birthday. In the future please hold my hand tight and let's walk further together." Qian then posted scans of his official wedding documents on his Weibo account.
