= Chongqing Blues =

- Film poster
- Traditional Chinese: 日照重慶
- Simplified Chinese: 日照重庆
- Literal meaning: Chongqing sunshine
- Hanyu Pinyin: rìzhào chóngqìng
- Directed by: Wang Xiaoshuai
- Written by: Yang Yishu; Wang Xiaoshuai
- Produced by: Hsu Hsiao-ming; Wang Xiaoshuai; Charles Law
- Starring: Wang Xueqi; Fan Bingbing; Qin Hao; Ziyi Wang; Li Feier
- Cinematography: Wu Di
- Edited by: Yang Hongyu; Fang Lei
- Music by: Peter Wong
- Production companies: Tempo Films; Dongchun Films; WXS Productions
- Release date: 13 May 2010 (Cannes)
- Running time: 110 minutes
- Country: China
- Language: Mandarin

Chongqing Blues (Chinese: 日照重慶) is a 2010 Chinese drama film directed by Wang Xiaoshuai. It was selected for the main competition at the 2010 Cannes Film Festival.

== Plot ==
Lin Quanhai, a sea captain and father, returns from a six-month journey and is informed that his 25-year-old son Lin Bo has been shot by the police. In finding out what happened, he comes to realize that he knew little of his son. He starts journeying back to Chongqing, a city where he once lived. He begins to understand the effect that his repeated absence had on his son's life.

== Cast ==
- Wang Xueqi as Lin Quanhai, the father
- Fan Bingbing as Zhu Qing
- Qin Hao as Xiao Hao, the friend
- Ziyi Wang as Lin Bo, the son
- Li Feier as Xiao Wen, the girlfriend
