= Little Fatty =

Internet meme originating from China

The photograph of Qian Zhijun used as the basis of the "Little Fatty" internet meme

Examples of photoshops using Qian's face - They include Qian as Choji Akimichi in Naruto, An Iraqi soldier, Doraemon, Yang Guo in The Return of the Condor Heroes, Moon from Hero (2002); The Hulk, Eddie Yang in The Medallion, Frodo Baggins in The Lord of the Rings: The Two Towers, Rose DeWitt Bukater in Titanic, and the Mona Lisa

Little Fatty (小胖 Xiǎo Pàng) is an internet meme involving superimposing the face of a boy on various photographs. Because of the internet meme and the resulting sudden fame, the boy, Qian Zhijun, decided to become a public figure, and he became a major celebrity and an actor in China. The "Little Fatty" meme is an example of earlier e gao works, which mainly consisted of images edited in Adobe Photoshop.

== History ==
In 2003, an unknown individual took a photograph of Qian Zhijun, a student from Jinshan District, Shanghai, while Qian attended a traffic safety event arranged by his school. Qian had volunteered to be a part of the "traffic safety day" along with his classmates. Qian weighed over 100 kilograms (220 lb), Qian was described by various writers as being "fat with a pudgy face" and having "an expression on his face like he'd been caught with his hand in the cookie jar."

Starting in 2003, his face was superimposed onto various other images. The images that Qian's face was superimposed on included film posters, photographs of celebrities, and classic works of art. His face, described by Jane MacArtney of The Times as a "slightly suspicious sidelong glance and cherubic cheeks", had been placed on people and characters like the Mona Lisa, Marilyn Monroe, Harry Potter, Austin Powers, and Jackie Chan. Qian's face also replaced the faces of Jake Gyllenhaal on a Brokeback Mountain poster and Tom Hanks on a The Da Vinci Code poster, and his face had also replaced one of the faces on an image of Mount Rushmore in the United States. In one photograph Qian's face appeared on a man next to President of the United States George W. Bush. In another Qian's face replaced that of Jack Sparrow of Pirates of the Caribbean. A Chinese newspaper said that Qian's face was "the face that launched 1,000 clicks". Macartney said "No sooner has a movie poster appeared than Little Fatty's features appear, replacing the face of the star." Because of the fame, Qian's images had hit rates in the tens of millions. Qian became so famous that non-Chinese journalism outlets, such as Reuters and The Independent, a British newspaper, covered his story. A Beijing computer professional quoted in the China Daily said that creating versions of "Little Fatty" was used as a form of competition for many people who were talented in using computers.

Stephen Bull, author of Photography: Volume 2 of Routledge Introductions to Media and Communications, said that "The popularity of the original image is as much down to Zhijun's connection with the viewer—via his apparently knowing look to camera—as it is his large body size." In regards to how public opinion could have dealt with a case like Qian's, in 2009 Anne Shann Yue Cheung (traditional Chinese: 張善喻; simplified Chinese: 张善喻; Jyutping: Zoeng1 Sin6 Jyu6; pinyin: Zhāng Shànyù), author of "Rethinking Public Privacy in the Internet Era: A Study of Virtual Persecution by the Internet Crowd," said "Little Fatty may easily win our sympathy if he brings any claims of privacy violations. After all, the harassment he was forced to put up with constituted bullying of the most insidious kind." Cheung argued that the original intent of the meme was "[a] notorious example of targeting for the sake of malicious entertainment and amusement".

=== Qian's discovery and response ===
An article in The Independent said that a chemistry teacher "first tipped him off that he was rapidly becoming an online superstar". Some girls at a concert asked Qian to have a photograph taken with them. Qian declined and said that the incident was one of his worst moments.

According to Qian, when the meme first appeared, Qian's teachers and classmates had avoided mentioning the phenomenon in order to not hurt his feelings. When he appeared for an interview with the Shanghai Daily, the newspaper did not disclose his real name in order to protect his privacy. Originally many internet users mistakenly believed that Qian was from Nanning, Guangxi. Originally Qian felt embarrassed by the internet phenomenon, but he said that "I have tried to turn sorrow into strength. At least this makes people smile and I have had quite a positive response from many surfers."

Qian said that he did not mind the photoshops when they were "well-meant". He said that he liked it when his face is superimposed on bodies of heroes, such as the character played by Russell Crowe in Gladiator. He said that he does not like it when his face is imposed next to the shoulder of a naked woman or when "touchup job is terrible". He also did not like it when his face was imposed on bodies of porn stars, and he did not like it when his face was imposed on the Buddha. In an interview Qian said that his idol was the Canadian actor Jim Carrey. Hours after the interview was published, images of Qian's face photoshopped on posters of films starring Carrey, like Bruce Almighty and Dumb and Dumber, appeared; the tag line in the altered photograph was changed to "Fat and Fatter."

Qian's mother told Qian that he needed to file a lawsuit, but the family did not figure out who they could sue. Qian decided to take actions to profit from his newfound fame. He contacted Gao Feng, an operator of xiaopang.cn, a website for obese people. Gao confirmed that the e-mail came from Qian, and Gao became Qian's agent and began promoting Qian on his website. Xiaopang.cn became a tribute site to "Little Fatty", and Qian became a member of the site. Because of the "Little Fatty" fame, Qian gained impersonators. Ultimately Qian became an actor and entertainer, hosting a cooking show for China Food TV and starring in The University Days of a Dog.

Stephen Bull, author of Photography: Volume 2 of Routledge Introductions to Media and Communications, said, in regards to Qian's decision to seek a career in the entertainment industry, that his scenario "is a kind of transient fame: a form of celebrity gained quickly through the infinite mobility of the digitally reproduced image, yet often lost quickly too." Hal Niedzviecki, author of The Peep Diaries: How We're Learning to Love Watching Ourselves and Our Neighbors, said "Like the Numa Numa guy who initially reported depression and not wanting to leave the house before eventually seeming to accept his new position as an accidental global entertainer, there's a sense that, well, the cat is out of the bag so what choice is there but to grin and bear it? Both end up launching official Web sites that predictably fail to capture the spontaneous, feverish energy of what was interesting about them in the first place."

== Significance in Chinese culture ==
Cara Wallis, author of "New Media Practices in China: Youth Patterns, Processes, and Politic", said that "Explanations for why Little Fatty's face generated such a craze abound, but perhaps most interesting is how the phenomenon demonstrates a newfound means of creative expression and satire in China, with pop culture themes that cross global and cultural boundaries." Clifford Coonan of The Independent said "So what does Qian's story tell us about modern China? Well, it reflects two of the most remarkable themes. It shows how growing affluence has translated into a serious increase in the number of obese people. And it demonstrates how the internet is providing a platform for creative expression that the traditional, strictly controlled media can't even begin to match." Jane Macartney of The Times said "[Qian's] is a tale of how China's obsession with the Internet reflects the need of people to communicate openly and freely in a country with few other means for self-expression."

== Significance about online behavior ==
Johan Lagerkvist, author of After the Internet, Before Democracy: Competing Norms in Chinese Media and Society, stated that the Little Fatty meme is "an illuminating example of how netizens can turn a person, without bothering about his consent, into the most clicked person online overnight". In regards to the human flesh search engine Lagerkvist explained that the Little Fatty meme demonstrates that the human flesh search engine "can also be directed against society's subaltern and the powerless" and that "[t]his raises important issues of the legitimate right to privacy, defamation, and slander."
