= Li Fei'er =

Chinese actress and singer

- 李菲兒
- Born: Li Fei; October 3, 1987 (age 38); Shenyang, Liaoning, China
- Other names: Monica Li; Xiao Li Fei
- Education: North China International Performing Arts School
- Occupations: Actress; singer
- Years active: 2006–present
- Agent: Mango Entertainment
- Partners: Kwon Sang-woo (2007); Huang Xiaoming (2007–2010)

Li Feier
- Simplified Chinese: 李菲儿
- Traditional Chinese: 李菲兒
Transcriptions
Standard Mandarin
- Hanyu Pinyin: Lǐ Fēi'ér
- Wade–Giles: Li^{3} Fei^{1}-'erh^{2}
- IPA: [lì féɪ.ǎɚ]
Yue: Cantonese
- Yale Romanization: Léih Fēi-yìh
- Jyutping: Lei^{5} Fei^{1}-ji^{4}
- IPA: [lej˩˧ fej˥.ji˩]
Southern Min
- Hokkien POJ: Lí hui-jî

Li Fei
- Simplified Chinese: 李菲
- Traditional Chinese: 李菲
Transcriptions
Standard Mandarin
- Hanyu Pinyin: Lǐ Fēi
- Wade–Giles: Li^{3} Fei^{1}
- IPA: [lì féɪ]
Yue: Cantonese
- Yale Romanization: Léih Fēi
- Jyutping: Lei^{5} Fei^{1}
- IPA: [lej˩˧ fej˥]
Southern Min
- Hokkien POJ: Lí hui
- Musical career
- Genres: Mandopop

Li Fei'er (simplified Chinese: 李菲儿; traditional Chinese: 李菲兒; pinyin: Lǐ Fēi'ér, born Li Fei; 3 October 1987), also known as Monica Li, is a Chinese actress and singer. After completing filming for her scenes in Royal Tramp, Li briefly trained in singing and dancing at now-defunct South Korean record label Good Entertainment in 2007.

== Career ==
In 2006, at the age of nineteen, Li made her acting debut in the historical television series The Secret History of Kangxi, playing the role of Princess Duan Min.

In 2007, after completion of filming for the wuxia drama Royal Tramp, Li went to South Korea and signed with Good Entertainment for singing and dancing training. However, she never debuted as an idol after refusing to undergo rhinoplasty as instructed by her agency and subsequently returned to China. In December the same year, she appeared in the music video of Royal Tramp co-star Huang Xiaoming's song Anything.

In 2008, Li co-starred in the war drama Great Wharf alongside Nicky Wu and Vivian Chen. In May the same year, Royal Tramp began airing on television, in which she played one of Wei Xiaobao's seven wives, Zeng Rou.

In January 2009, Li co-starred alongside Ady An and William Feng in Four Women Conflict, where she played a cold but intelligent girl. She received critical reviews for her performance in this drama.

In May 2010, together with Bai Shan, Yue Yueli amongst others, Li co-starred in the family drama Good Wife and Mother. In July the same year, she co-starred in the period drama Republic of China Past Events directed by Yiming Lian, playing the role of Miaoyu, the most beautiful woman of Shanghai Bund. Three months later, Li co-starred with Joe Cheng in the idol drama That Love Comes, playing a store clerk. In November, she starred in the family movie Chongqing Blues. In December, Li co-starred in the comedy movie The Kidnap with Chapman To and Ye Yiqian.

In February 2011, Li co-starred in the romance movie Somebody to Love with Annie Wu and Dennis Wu. In the film, she played Jane, a newly hired production director. In March the same year, she starred in the suspense movie Together. In the film, she played Xu Xiaochun, a female college dropout. A month later on 24 April, Li participated in the third season of the Chinese variety show Dancing Miracle. Later in October, she appeared in the comedy film Scary Market, playing the role of a nitpicking cashier, Jenny.

In June 2012, Li starred in the urban emotional drama Green Porcelain, adapted from the novel of the same name, in which she played Zhou Xinran, the daughter of Zhou Yunnian, secretary of the municipal legal committee.

In April 2013, Li starred in the youth inspirational drama Happy Noodle, in which she played Zhu Lingling, the assistant to the vice chairman of the noodle shop. In August the same year, she co-starred with Nick Cheung and Eddie Peng in the action movie Unbeatable.

In April 2014, Li participated in the reality show Divas Hit the Road as part of the show's "Five Sisters". In September the same year, she participated in the outdoor reality show Family Go (明星家族的2天1夜), forming a "family" with Cica Zhou, Bu Xueliang, Du Haitao along with seven other members and an X guest. One month later, she starred in the modern urban drama Wonderful Family, in which she played Yan Xiaoyuan, a liar who can sacrifice everything for money.

In June 2015, Li co-starred with William Chan and Siqin Gaowa in the action movie Lost in Wrestling. In the film, she played a Hong Kong fighter Yueyue. In September the same year, Li co-starred with Lee Hyun-jae and Zheng Yuanyuan in the romantic comedy movie The Old Cinderella 2.

In January 2016, Li co-starred alongside Kimi Li and Leon Jay Williams in the romance movie For Love, where she played an intellectual youthful urban white-collar worker Liang Shuang. In March the same year, she co-starred with Park Hae-jin and Shawn Zhang in the romance drama Far Away Love, in which she played the optimistic and tough single mother Meng Chuxia. A month later, Li released a single Turn Around (转身), which will serve as the theme song of the movie The Old Cinderella 2. In May the same year, Li was invited to attend the closing ceremony and awards ceremony of the 23rd Beijing College Student Film Festival, and served as the guest of honour. In September, she appeared in the youth inspirational idol drama Boy Hood. Later in October, Li co-starred with Bao Bei'er and Jia Ling in the costume drama Happy Mitan.

In January 2017, Li participated in the ice reality show The King Of Kanone (跨界冰雪王), where she advanced to the top six. In March, Li co-starred alongside Song Minyu and Zheng Haoyuan in the costume idol drama Beauties of the King, playing the rebellious eldest daughter of an ancient security escort company.

In May 2018, Li participated in the Beijing TV-produced cross-border music reality show Crossover Singer 3 as the first guest singer. In November the same year, Li was featured in "Dream Up", the first official promotion song of the "Everyone is a Volunteer" charity project.

In January 2019, Li co-starred with Yan Yikuan in the costume drama Kunpeng and Butterfly.

== Personal life ==
In the first half of 2007, Li was rumoured to be in a relationship with South Korean actor Kwon Sang-woo, whom she met during her brief training period in South Korea. Although the two were spotted on dates in both their respective countries, Kwon's agency denied the rumours. In December 2007, it was reported that Li was dating her Royal Tramp co-star Huang Xiaoming since July of that year.

In May 2010, Li and Huang were said to have broken up with rumours that the latter became involved with Angelababy.

== Filmography ==
=== Film ===
Year	English title	Chinese title	Role	Notes/Ref.
2009	Dust Net Sunlight	塵網曦光	A'Feng	Digital film
2010	Chongqing Blues	日照重慶	Xiaowen	
2010	The Kidnap	綁架冰淇淋	Du Yaoyao	
2011	Somebody to Love	我们约会吧	Jane	
2011	Together	幸存日	Xu Xiaochun	
2011	Scary Market	黑點	Jenny	
2012	Dark Wedding	诡婚		
2013	Unbeatable	激戰	Coco	
2015	Lost in Wrestling	搏击迷城	Yueyue	
2015	The Old Cinderella 2	脱轨时代	Zhang Yaohua / Yao Zi	
2016	For Love	致我们终将到来的爱情	Liang Shuang	
2017	Yesterday Once More	昨日重現		

=== Television series ===
Year	English title	Chinese title	Role	Network	Notes/Ref.
2006	Secret History of Kang Xi	康熙秘史	Princess Duan Min	Beijing TV	
2007	Great Wharf	大碼頭		Beijing TV	
2008	Royal Tramp	鹿鼎記	Zeng Rou	Jiangsu TV, TVB	
2009	Four Women Conflict	锁清秋	Su Xinhe	Dragon TV	
2009	Good Wife and Mother	贤妻良母	Chen Jianhui	Hebei TV, Henan TV, Jiangxi TV, Shanxi TV	
2009	The Qin Empire	大秦帝國之裂變	Hei Zao	CCTV	
2010	Republic of China Past Events	民国往事	Miaoyu	CETV, Jiangxi TV, Shanxi TV, Yunnan TV	
2010	That Love Comes	欢迎爱光临	Ye Zi	Taiwan TV	
2012	Green Porcelain	青瓷	Zhou Xinran	Hunan TV	
2013	Happy Noodle	幸福的面条	Zhi Lingling	Zhejiang TV	
2014	Wonderful Family	奇葩一家親	Yan Xiaoyuan	Jiangsu TV	
2016	Far Away Love	遠得要命的愛情	Meng Chuxia	Guangdong TV, Southeast TV	
2016	Woman Flower Dream	女人花似梦	Dong Qing	Hunan TV	
2016	Happy Mitan	欢喜密探	Hong Xing	Youku	Cameo
2017	Boy Hood	我们的少年时代	Xia Lu	Hunan TV	
2017	Beauties of the King	龙凤店传奇	Feng'er	iQiyi	
2017	Beauties of the King 2	龙凤店传奇	Feng'er	iQiyi	
2018	Beauties of the King 3	龙凤店传奇	Feng'er	iQiyi	
2019	Kunpeng and Butterfly	鲲鹏与蝴蝶	Shuiyue		
2022	Boy Hood 2	我们的少年时代2	Xia Lu	Hunan TV	

=== Variety show ===
Year	English title	Chinese title	Role	Notes/Ref.
2014	Divas Hit the Road 1	花儿与少年	Cast member	
2016	Perhaps Love 3	如果爱	Cast member	
2017	Relativity of Life	生活相对论	Cast member	
2017	The King Of Kanone	跨界冰雪王	Contestant	
2018	Crossover Singer 3	跨界歌王第三季	Contestant	
2021	Sisters Who Make Waves 2	乘风破浪的姐姐2	Contestant	

== Discography ==
=== Singles ===
Year	English title	Chinese title	Album	Notes/Ref.
2016	"Turn Around"	转身	Turn Around	
2018	"Dream Up"		"Everyone is a Volunteer" Charity Project	

=== Music video ===
Year	English title	Chinese title	Singer	Notes/Ref.
2007	Anything	什麼都可以	Huang Xiaoming	
2010	The Fool's Promise	傻子的約定	Dick and Cowboy	

== Awards and nominations ==
Year	Award	Category	Nominated work	Result	Ref.
Major awards
2014	12th Changchun Film Festival	Best Supporting Actress	Unbeatable	Nominated	
2015	17th Huading Awards	Audience's Favorite Stars	—N/a	Won	
Other awards
2008	Sina Television Series Second Quarter Selection	Best Couple Award	Royal Tramp	Won	
2008	Global "Langska"	Best New Female Singer		Won	
2014	Ruili Yiren Fashion Magazine Awards Ceremony	Popular Fashion Idol	—N/a	Won	
