= Yinjifu =

Yinjifu 尹吉甫镇
- Town
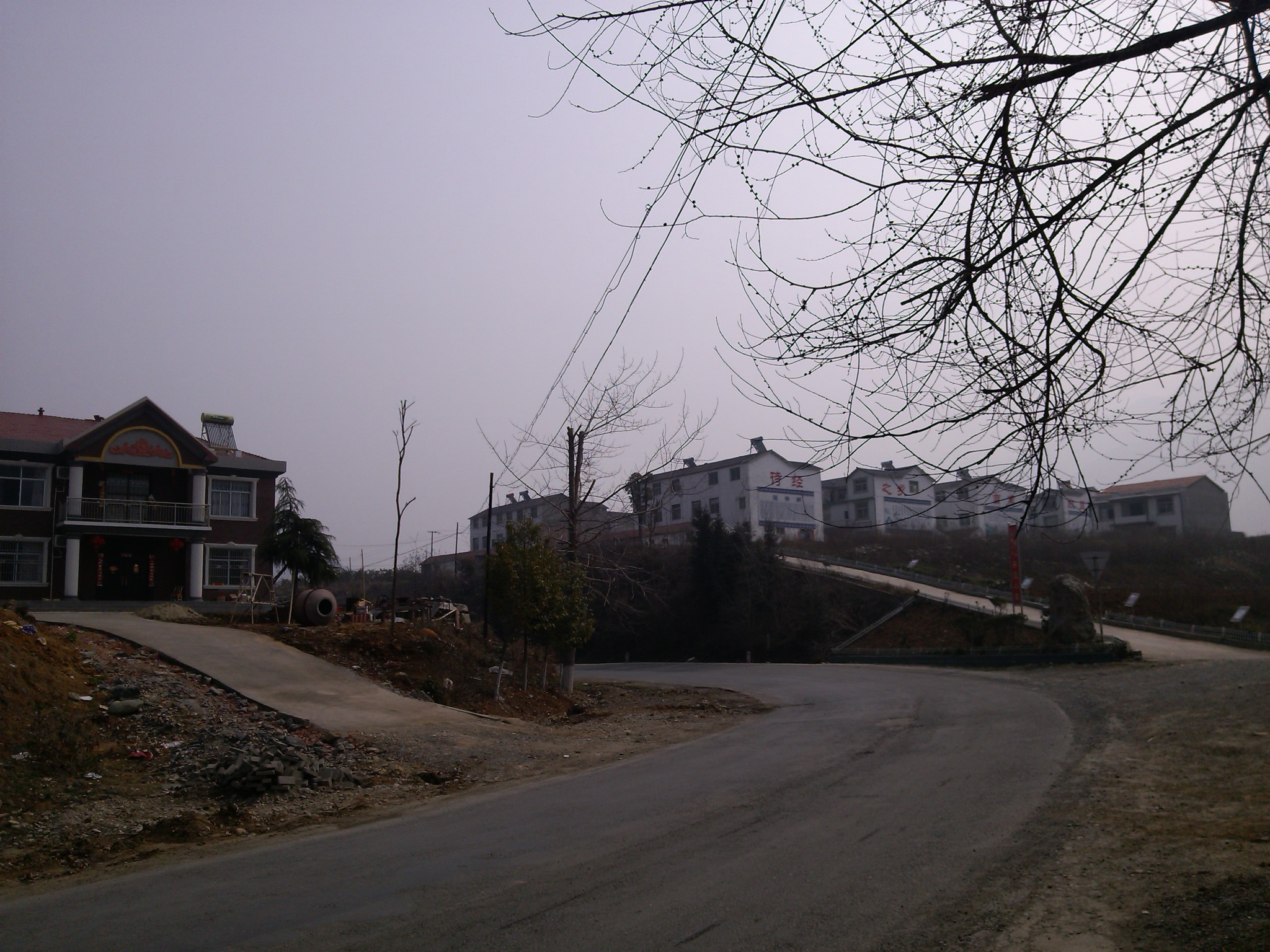
- Langkou Village in 2013

- Location in Hubei
- Coordinates: 32°2′13″N 111°2′6″E
- Country: People's Republic of China
- Province: Hubei
- Prefecture-level city: Shiyan
- County: Fang County

Population (2019)
  - Total: 10,165
- Time zone: UTC+8 (China Standard)

Yinjifu (simplified Chinese: 尹吉甫镇; traditional Chinese: 尹吉甫鎮; pinyin: Yǐnjífǔ Zhèn) is a town in Fang County, Hubei province, China. To promote tourism, the town was named after Yin Jifu, a Chinese minister of the Zhou dynasty, who assisted King Xuan of Zhou in military campaigns against the Xianyun. The town was established in March 2012, following an administrative reshuffling, and administers eight villages. As of 2019, Yinjifu has a hukou population of 10,165.

== Administrative divisions ==
As of 2020, Yinjifu administers the following eight villages:

- Langkou Village (榔口村)
- Shenjiawan Village (沈家湾村)
- Langyu Village (榔峪村)
- Yudidian Village (玉堤店村)
- Shuangwan Village (双湾村)
- Qixingou Village (齐心沟村)
- Zhucangdong Village (珠藏洞村)
- Tangjiagou Village (唐家沟村)

== Demographics ==
As of 2019, Yinjifu has a hukou population of 10,165, down slightly from 10,236 in 2018.

Yinjifu's predecessor, Langkou Township (simplified Chinese: 榔口乡; traditional Chinese: 榔口鄉; pinyin: Lángkǒu Xiāng) had a population of 7,261 in the 2010 Chinese Census, down from 11,175 in the 2000 Chinese Census.

== See also ==
- List of township-level divisions of Hubei
