= Yin Jifu =

Minister of King Xuan of Zhou

Yin Jifu (Chinese: 尹吉甫; pinyin: Yǐn Jífǔ; lit. 'Minister Jifu', fl. 826–778 BC) was a Chinese minister of the Zhou dynasty, who assisted King Xuan of Zhou in military campaigns against the Xianyun.

Several poems in the Classic of Poetry are attributed to him, including "Songgao" (崧高) and "Zhengmin" (烝民), which praise King Xuan's rule; as well as "Hanyi" (韓奕) and "Jiang Han" (江漢).

The modern scholar Li Chendong suggested that the entire book was written by him. Li's decades of research had concluded that the places, people, and events mentioned in the Classic of Poetry are either consistent with those known to be related to Yin Jifu, or from the same time period. This view has not been widely accepted.

The town of Yinjifu, Fang County was named after him to promote tourism. Fang County and Yanjin County, Henan have both laid claims to being Yin's ancestral home.
