= China Food TV =

Chinese cooking television network based in Qingdao

China Broadcast & TV Culture (Qingdao) Co, Ltd (青岛广电中视文化有限公司 Qīngdǎo Guǎngdiàn Zhōngshì Wénhuà Yǒuxiàngōngsī) is a television production company in China. It operates China Food TV (CFTV, S: 中华美食频道, T: 中華美食頻道, P: Zhōnghuá Měishí Píndào), a digital pay television channel focusing on cooking shows. The corporate headquarters is in Office 214, Building G3 of the South City Software Park (市南软件园 Shìnán Ruǎnjiànyuán) in Qingdao, Shandong.

China Food TV is aired nationally across mainland China, and the CFTV company is the largest food show production agency in mainland China. The CFTV company produces about 60 minutes of self-made food shows daily. Édouard Cointreau serves as the honorary president of CFTV.

== History ==
The CFTV company, a joint-stock and program operating company, was established on January 18, 2001. The Qingdao Broadcast and Television Bureau (青岛广播电视局 Qīngdǎo Guǎngbō Diànshì Jú) invested in CFTV during its structural reformation. The first show produced by the company was the Man-Han Style Banquet, which was broadcast on China Central Television (CCTV) and Qingdao TV.

The State Administration of Radio, Film, and Television (SARFT) permitted the company to establish its own national pay television cable channel. The channel was officially launched on November 8, 2005.

China Food TV sponsors the "Mid-Autumn Food Festival" and the "Sino-German Food Dialogue", two events that occur during the Asia-Pacific Weeks (German: Asien-Pazifik-Wochen, APW) celebration in Berlin, Germany.

The Chinese version of the channel ceased broadcasting on 1 April 2025; the US version, China Food TV USA, will continue broadcasting for the foreseeable future.

== Programs ==
The first show produced by the company was the Man-Han Style Banquet (滿漢全席 Mǎn Hànquánxí, referring to the Manchu Han Imperial Feast), which was broadcast on China Central Television (CCTV) and Qingdao TV. China Food TV and China Central Television had jointly organized the program, and released many derivative products. For instance they used "leftovers" from the Manhan Quanxi shooting process so they could create "teaser trailer" programs. Therefore, the fame resulting in the brand effect would increase. China Food TV airs reruns of the programs and created recorded copies, compilations, and derivative books and video discs. For instance China Food TV created Meiri Yi Cai (A Dish Every Day) and Manhan Quanxi - Quanguo Bengren Dianshi Leitai Sai (Manchu Han Imperial Feast - National Cooking "Leitai" Competition on Television). Wang Qitai (王琪泰 Wáng Qítài) of the Taizhou Broadcast and Television Bureau said that the marketing took a "three-dimensional manner" so brands could be marketed to domestic mainland Chinese audiences.

Little Fatty's Food Diary (小胖美食日记 Xiǎo Pàng Měishí Rìjì) is a Chinese cooking show produced by China Food TV and hosted by Qian Zhijun. The program began broadcast from a television station in Qingdao, Shandong on January 29, 2007. The show's production was scheduled for 365 episodes. 52 guests were scheduled to appear on the program with Qian. Qian attended the contract signing ceremony in Qingdao on January 29, 2007. Around that period, Qian recorded two special programs which were broadcast on China Food TV and the Manhan Quanxi Food Entertainment Website. The program aired on mainland Chinese televisions. The program was also broadcast on Sohu, one of China's major web portals.

== China Food TV USA ==
Qingdao, World Channel Inc. and CFTV partnered to establish China Food TV USA (CFTV-USA, T: 美洲中華美食頻道, S: 美洲中华美食频道, P: Měizhōu Zhōnghuá Měishí Píndào), a 24-hour Chinese food cooking network in the United States. It was scheduled to begin on February 1, 2011, coinciding with the Chinese New Year period. The programming airs in New York City, Los Angeles, the San Francisco Bay Area, and the Sacramento Valley. The operating company, World Channel Inc., has its offices in Brisbane, California.

In the San Francisco Bay Area the programming airs on digital channel KMTP 32.2. In Sacramento it airs locally on station KBTV-CD 8.1, which is a Crossings TV affiliate. Crossings TV is also aired throughout the Central Valley of California on Comcast channel 238 and in Greater New York City as Time Warner Cable Channel 503. In the Los Angeles area CFTV USA airs on digital channel KNLA 20.3. People not living in the New York, Los Angeles, San Francisco, and Sacramento areas may watch CFTV USA through IPTV.

The programming is in Mandarin and Cantonese. The programming includes Man-Han Style Banquet and Little Fatty's Food Diary.
