= Sisters Who Make Waves season 2 =

Sisters Who Make Waves
- Season 2
- Native name
- Traditional Chinese: 乘風破浪的姐姐2
- Simplified Chinese: 乘风破浪的姐姐2
- Literal meaning: Sisters who break waves
- Hanyu Pinyin: Chéngfēngpòlàng De Jiějiě 2
- Presented by: Huang Xiaoming
- No. of contestants: 30
- Winners: Summer Jike; Wang Ou; Rainie Yang; Yang Yuying; Na Ying; Joey Yung; Bibi Zhou.
- No. of episodes: 13

Release
- Original network: Mango TV
- Original release: January 23 – April 21, 2021

Season chronology
- ← Previous; Season 1 Next → Season 3

Sisters Who Make Waves 2 (Chinese: 乘风破浪的姐姐2; pinyin: Chéngfēngpòlàng De Jiějiě Èr) is the second season of Sisters Who Make Waves which premiered on January 23 in Mango TV. This season featured 30 celebrities over 30 who compete to form a seven-member girl group. The seven-member group formed on April 21, 2021, composed of Summer Jike, Wang Ou, Rainie Yang, Yang Yuying, Na Ying, Joey Yung and Bibi Zhou.

== Concept ==
Following the success of the first season last summer, Mango TV greenly a second season slated for premiere in January 2021. The season mostly follow similarities to the previous season, with overhaul and some improvements done on the last season.

== Contestants ==
Contestants with a known English name will be used, unless otherwise stated, names are arranged in surname based on romanized pinyin. All ages and years are at the time of the competition.

- – Break-in round contestant

List of Contestants
Name (Chinese name)	Residence	Age	Career years	Results
Natasha Na (那英)	Liaoning	54	34	Debuted (First place)
Bibi Zhou (周笔畅)	Hunan	36	16	Debuted (second place)
Rainie Yang (楊丞琳)	Taiwan	37	21	Debuted (third place)
Joey Yung (容祖儿)	Hong Kong	41	22	Debuted (fourth place)
Angel Wang (王鸥)	Guangxi	39	18	Debuted (fifth place)
Yang Yuying (杨钰莹)	Jiangxi	50	31	Debuted (sixth place)
Summer Jike (吉克隽逸)	Sichuan	33	9	Debuted (Seventh place)
Xiaoyun Chen (陈小纭)	Jilin	32	11	Finalists (did not debut)
Jiang Luxia (蒋璐霞)	Inner Mongolia	34	14	Finalists (did not debut)
Sophia Hu (胡静)	Yunnan	43	21	Finalists (did not debut)
Cecilia Cheung (张柏芝)	Hong Kong	41	23	Finalists (did not debut)
Monica Li (李菲儿)	Liaoning	37	19	Finalists (did not debut)
Tifa Chen (陈梓童)	Jiangsu	34	15	Finalists (did not debut)
Coco Lyu (吕一)	Chongqing	37	19	Finalists (did not debut)
Vivi Jiang (江映蓉)	Sichuan	33	14	Eliminated (after fourth performance)
Shanshan Yuan (袁姗姗)	Hubei	34	13	Eliminated (after fourth performance)
Viann Zhang (张馨予)	Jiangsu	34	14	Eliminated (after fourth performance)
Michelle Chen (陈妍希)	Taiwan	38	15	Eliminated (after third performance)
Jie Dong (董洁)	Liaoning	41	22	Eliminated (after third performance)
Qing Jia (贾青)	Shaanxi	35	16	Eliminated (after third performance)
Xian Zi (弦子)	Guangxi	35	16	Eliminated (after third performance)
Lisha Cheng (程莉莎)	Hubei	44	20	Eliminated (after second performance)
Alan Dawa Dolma (阿兰)	Sichuan	34	14	Eliminated (after second performance)
Jin Qiaoqiao (金巧巧)	Liaoning	46	28	Eliminated (after second performance)
Lulu Xuan (宣璐)	Jiangsu	30	13	Eliminated (after second performance)
Zuo Xiaoqing (左小青)	Hunan	44	28	Eliminated (after second performance)
Angela An (安又琪)	Heilongjiang	45	28	Eliminated (after first performance)
Tang Jingmei (汤晶媚)	Jiangxi	34	12	Eliminated (after first performance)
Michelle Dong (董璇)	Heilongjiang	42	19	Eliminated (after first performance)
Lidia Liu (刘烨)	Jiangsu	32	9	Eliminated (after first performance)
Jennifer Li (李慧珍)	Zhejiang	45	28	Eliminated (after first performance)
Li Zeng (曾黎)	Hubei	45	21	Eliminated (Lost break-in)
Sue Su (苏运莹)	Hainan	30	6	Eliminated (Lost break-in)

== Episodes ==
=== Episode 1 (Jan 22, 2021) ===
In the first episode, 30 contestants performed a personal preliminary stage and were rated by four mentors: personal traits were scored by Mani Fok, group potential was scored by Du Hua, vocal performance was scored by Liu Zhuo, and stage performance was scored by Chen Qiyuan.

Initial Evaluation Performance Results
Initial evaluation stage
Contestant	Vocal Song	Dance Song	Initial stage score (25 pts each, total score of 100 pts)					
Contestant	Vocal Song	Dance Song	Group Potential	Personality	Vocals	Stage	Sister Likes	Total score
Bibi Zhou	"500万个灵魂和每一条皱纹"	"叛逆的缪斯"	18	20	18	18	29	103
Natasha Na	"出现又离开"	"不完美"	22	21	21	15	29	108
Cheng Lisha	"夜来香"	"十字街头"	21	20	13	19	28	101
Chen Xiaoyun	"真心不假"	"情人"	16	15	12	19	26	88
Dong Jie	"蝴蝶飞啊"	"胡桃夹子"	/	/	13	/	29	101
Lulu Xuan	"不要再孤单"	"不同凡想"	/	/	12	/	28	100
Joey Yung	"长大"	"未知"	24	21	20	21	29	115
Yang Yuying	"我不想说"	"轻轻地告诉你"	16	19	16	16	29	95
Cecilia Cheung	"星语心愿"	"Candy Kisses"	19	18	14	13	27	91
Yuan Shanshan	"再回首"	"我爱我的泥垢"	11	14	3	16	27	71
Vivi Jiang	"发生秀 Fashion Show"	"把握你的美"	19	19	18	22	29	107
Angela An	"我恨我爱你"	"糖果 Candy"	15	16	17	5	27	80
Tang Jingmei	"月光爱人"	"舞曲"	/	/	/	22	28	99
Lidia Liu	"心恋"	"扇子舞"	/	/	13	/	29	95
Xian Zi	"爱存在"	"醉清风"	/	21	/	/	29	111
Jia Qing	"爱我的请举手"	"怪美的"	/	/	/	/	29	97
Coco Lyu	"耶利亚女神"	"时候"	/	/	/	/	29	102
Tifa Chen	"RIGHT NOW+不需要男朋友"	"TIFA On The Track"	23	21	23	23	29	119
Alan Dawa Dolma	"神山颂"	"浣溪沙·谁念西风独自凉"	16	19	22	18	27	102
Michelle Chen	"小星星"	"我一见你就笑"	20	20	14	19	29	102
Jike Junyi	"交出邦尼"	"In Control"	21	19	20	20	29	109
Michelle Dong	"梦一场"	"怪美的"	/	/	/	/	29	94
Zuo Xiaoqing	"心恋"	"西玫"	/	/	/	/	29	102
Jennifer Li	"无名之辈"	"4U"	/	/	/	/	29	98
Jin Qiaoqiao	"天竺少女"	"大鱼"	/	/	/	/	29	108
Sophia Hu	"梅兰梅兰我爱你"	"大鱼"	19	19	14	23	29	104
Viann Zhang	"从明天"	"手扶拖拉机斯基"	17	19	13	17	28	94
Jiang Luxia	"阴天"	"Woman"	21	21	12	22	28	104
Monica Li	"有一个姑娘"	"2045"	17	19	13	20	29	98
Angel Wang	"呼吸有害"	"十字街头"	20	19	12	23	29	103

=== Episode 2 (Jan 29, 2021) ===
In preparation for the first public performance, the Challengers Team (those whose scores from Ep. 1 were in the lower half) challenges the Defenders Team (those whose scores from Ep. 1 were in the upper half). Depending on each team's score, the Challengers team will receive a certain amount of slots to switch positions.

The Challengers team, led by Du Hua, are split up into three 5-person groups. Then, they are asked to pick two of the three songs given: "理所当然"(Regular) by WayV, "所有人都在玩手机" by 马赛克乐队, and "Mulan" by Lexie Liu. During the group evaluations, each contestant performs a section of the song they chose individually, and based on their individual performance, they are grouped into their respective five-person teams.

The Defenders team, led by Huo Wenxi, are split up into five 3-person groups. Then, they are asked to pick from five songs given: "不屑完美" by A-Lin and 倪子冈, "在这里请你随意" by S.U.E., "归零"(Reset) by Sandy Lam, "现在不跳舞要干嘛" by Lala Hsu, and "A级娱乐" by A-Mei. Each of the five groups then practice for their respective song, with the performance order determined by the initial stage results.

=== Episode 3 (Feb 5, 2021) ===
During the first public performance, the Challengers and Defenders Team face off against each other, with each audience member giving their vote to a performance during a 60-second period as well as three votes to the individual contestants. Throughout the performance rounds, the Challengers team has three chances to challenge the Defenders Team in order to earn slots for switching places. At the end, 5 contestants are temporarily eliminated: Angela An, Tang Jingmei, Liu Ye, Jennifer Li, and Michelle Dong. The three contestants in the Challengers Team who received the most individual votes– Yang Yuying, Cecilia Cheung, and Cheng Lisha– moved up to the Defenders Team. Meanwhile, the three contestants in the Defenders Team who received the least individual votes– Jiang Luxia, Zuo Xiaoqing, and Jin Qiaoqiao– moved down to the Challengers Team.

1st Public Performance Results
#	Performance Song Title	Member	Group Vote	Individual vote	Result	Challenge Result
1	"现在不跳舞要干嘛" (Lala Hsu)	Tifa Chen	745	175	Pass	
1	"现在不跳舞要干嘛" (Lala Hsu)	Jiang Luxia	745	82	Pass	
1	"现在不跳舞要干嘛" (Lala Hsu)	Vivi Jiang	745	87	Pass	
2	"所有人都在玩手机"(马赛克乐队)	Yang Yuying	738	556	Pass	Challenge unsuccessful
2	"所有人都在玩手机"(马赛克乐队)	Dong Jie	738	172	Pass	Challenge unsuccessful
2	"所有人都在玩手机"(马赛克乐队)	Michelle Dong	738		Eliminated	Challenge unsuccessful
2	"所有人都在玩手机"(马赛克乐队)	Jennifer Li	738		Eliminated	Challenge unsuccessful
2	"所有人都在玩手机"(马赛克乐队)	Cheng Lisha	738	363	Pass	Challenge unsuccessful
3	"在这里请你随意" (Sue Su)	Natasha Na	773	608	Pass	
3	"在这里请你随意" (Sue Su)	Angel Wang	773	223	Pass	
3	"在这里请你随意" (Sue Su)	Zuo Xiaoqing	773	72	Pass	
4	"理所当然" (WayV)	Cecilia Cheung	721	532	Pass	Challenge unsuccessful
4	"理所当然" (WayV)	Tang Jingmei	721		Eliminated	Challenge unsuccessful
4	"理所当然" (WayV)	Chen Xiaoyun	721	166	Pass	Challenge unsuccessful
4	"理所当然" (WayV)	Lidia Liu	721		Eliminated	Challenge unsuccessful
4	"理所当然" (WayV)	Yuan Shanshan	721	197	Pass	Challenge unsuccessful
5	"A级娱乐" (A-Mei)	Xian Zi	537	94	Pass	
5	"A级娱乐" (A-Mei)	Coco Lyu	537	83	Pass	
5	"A级娱乐" (A-Mei)	Jin Qiaoqiao	537	54	Pass	
6	"Mulan" (Lexie Liu)	Angela An	785		Eliminated	Challenge Successful
6	"Mulan" (Lexie Liu)	Jia Qing	785	276	Pass	Challenge Successful
6	"Mulan" (Lexie Liu)	Monica Li	785	76	Pass	Challenge Successful
6	"Mulan" (Lexie Liu)	Viann Zhang	785	240	Pass	Challenge Successful
6	"Mulan" (Lexie Liu)	Lulu Xuan	785	97	Pass	Challenge Successful
7	"归零"(Reset) (Sandy Lam)	Joey Yung	769	540	Pass	
7	"归零"(Reset) (Sandy Lam)	A Lan	769	107	Pass	
7	"归零"(Reset) (Sandy Lam)	Michelle Chen	769	140	Pass	
8	"不屑完美" (A-Lin)	Jike Junyi	866	281	Pass	Ranked 1st; all members safe
8	"不屑完美" (A-Lin)	Sophia Hu	866	112	Pass	Ranked 1st; all members safe
8	"不屑完美" (A-Lin)	Bibi Zhou	866	327	Pass	Ranked 1st; all members safe

=== Episode 4 (Feb 12, 2021) ===
In preparation for the second public performance, the remaining contestants are grouped into five groups of 5 based on self-selection and mutual selection (two 5-person groups in the Challengers team and three 5-person groups in the Defenders team). They then go through another round of pre-performance evaluations, and the group from the Challengers team with the lowest evaluation score will face the danger of switching places with the Defenders team if they rank last again in the performance.

=== Episode 5 (Feb 19, 2021) ===
During the second public performance, the Challengers and Defenders Team face off against each other once more, with each audience member giving their vote to a performance during a 60-second period as well as three votes to the individual contestants. The Challengers team has the opportunity to choose which group from the Defenders team to challenge. If one out of the two Challenger teams successfully challenges the Defenders team by earning a higher score, the Challengers team will gain two position-switching slots; if both Challenger teams successfully challenges the Defenders team, there will be four position-switching slots gained. The team with the highest ranking earns the "safe" status and all its members advance to the next round, while the other teams face the danger of having at least one member eliminated.

2nd Public Performance Results
#	Performance Song Title	Member	Group Vote	Individual vote	Result	Challenge Result
1	"红颜旧" (Liu Tao)	Yang Yuying (leader)	765	346	Pass	Ranked 3rd
1	"红颜旧" (Liu Tao)	A Lan	765	98	Eliminated	Ranked 3rd
1	"红颜旧" (Liu Tao)	Cecilia Cheung	765	216	Pass	Ranked 3rd
1	"红颜旧" (Liu Tao)	Cheng Lisha	765	98	Eliminated	Ranked 3rd
1	"红颜旧" (Liu Tao)	Michelle Chen	765	146	Pass	Ranked 3rd
2	"快乐宝贝" (青春美少女）	Na Ying (leader)	829	440	Pass	Ranked 1st; all members safe
2	"快乐宝贝" (青春美少女）	Tifa Chen	829	75	Pass	Ranked 1st; all members safe
2	"快乐宝贝" (青春美少女）	Vivi Jiang	829	260	Pass	Ranked 1st; all members safe
2	"快乐宝贝" (青春美少女）	Joey Yung	829	502	Pass	Ranked 1st; all members safe
2	"快乐宝贝" (青春美少女）	Angel Wang	829	372	Pass	Ranked 1st; all members safe
3	"无乐不作"（Van Fan)	Jike Junyi (leader)	813	198	Pass	Ranked 2nd
3	"无乐不作"（Van Fan)	Bibi Zhou	813	479	Pass	Ranked 2nd
3	"无乐不作"（Van Fan)	Sophia Hu	813	231	Pass	Ranked 2nd
3	"无乐不作"（Van Fan)	Coco Lyu	813	134	Pass	Ranked 2nd
3	"无乐不作"（Van Fan)	Xian Zi	813	139	Pass	Ranked 2nd
4	"哪吒"（GAI，大痒痒）	Monica Li (leader)	794	112	Pass	Successfully Challenged 红颜旧 team
4	"哪吒"（GAI，大痒痒）	Lulu Xuan	794	62	Eliminated	Successfully Challenged 红颜旧 team
4	"哪吒"（GAI，大痒痒）	Jiang Luxia	794	74	Pass	Successfully Challenged 红颜旧 team
4	"哪吒"（GAI，大痒痒）	Zuo Xiaoqing	794	68	Eliminated	Successfully Challenged 红颜旧 team
4	"哪吒"（GAI，大痒痒）	Jia Qing	794	76	Pass	Successfully Challenged 红颜旧 team
5	"来" (Tia Ray)	Viann Zhang (leader)	772	235	Pass	Unsuccessfully Challenged 无乐不作 team
5	"来" (Tia Ray)	Chen Xiaoyun	772	193	Pass	Unsuccessfully Challenged 无乐不作 team
5	"来" (Tia Ray)	Jin Qiaoqiao	772	53	Eliminated	Unsuccessfully Challenged 无乐不作 team
5	"来" (Tia Ray)	Yuan Shanshan	772	152	Pass	Unsuccessfully Challenged 无乐不作 team
5	"来" (Tia Ray)	Dong Jie	772	186	Pass	Unsuccessfully Challenged 无乐不作 team

=== Episode 6 (Feb 26, 2021) ===
For the 3rd public performance, the members of the Break-In Challenge group are introduced: Rainie Yang, Sue Su, and Zeng Li. For the Defenders group, Natasha Na, whose team won 1st place last round, continues as one of the leaders while Bibi Zhou and Joey Yung, the contestants with the highest combined personal ranking, lead the remaining two teams. After the leaders pick their song choices, the remaining contestants pick their teams in order based on personal ranking, and are split into three 5-person groups. In the Challengers group, Monica Li was voted to be leader of a 5-person group. During the pre-performance evaluation, each of the four teams selects one person to perform, and depending on their evaluation result, each team earns different amounts of time to campaign for votes.

3rd Pre-Performance Evaluation Score
Song/Contestant	Vocal Score	Dance Score	Total	Ranking
逆光 / Natasha Na	48	48	96	1
跟着感觉走 / Viann Zhang	34	42	76	4
孤寂者 / Tifa Chen	45	49	94	3
Shero / Monica Li	46	49	95	2

=== Episode 7 (Mar 5, 2021) ===
The third public performance begins with the Break-In team showcasing their solo performances before the Defenders and Challengers team face off against each other. The group who receives the most votes becomes the Safe Team and all its members advance to the next round without the risk of being replaced by any of the Break-In team members. If the Break-In team receives more than 800 votes for their preliminary solos, they can choose to challenge any 3 of the teams excluding the Safe Team. Otherwise, they can choose to challenge any 2 of the teams excluding the Safe Team.

At the end, Joey Yung's team received the highest performance score and became the Safe Team. Both the Challengers team and Break-In Challengers successfully challenged Bibi Zhou's team, leading to two contestants from the team to be eliminated. Ultimately, Rainie Yang was able to successfully break in, while Michelle Chen, Xian Zi, Dong Jie, and Jia Qing were eliminated.

#	Performance Song Title	Member	Group Vote	Individual Vote	Result	Challenge Result
Opening Performance: Wild Goose Flying South《雁南飞》 (Yang Yuying, Xian Zi, Monica Li, Coco Lv, Chen Xiaoyun, Dong Jie, Michelle Chen) Our Life is Full of Sunshine《我们的生活充满阳光》(Natasha Na, Angel Wang, Joey Yung, Jiang Luxia, Bibi Zhou, Vivi Jiang, Sophia Hu, Viann Zhang, Yuan Shanshan) Let's Play Drum and Sing Songs《打起手鼓唱起歌》 (Jike Junyi, Cecilia Cheung, Tifa Chen, Jia Qing, Sue Su, Zeng Li, Rainie Yang)
1	"年轮说" (Rainie Yang)	Rainie Yang	782			Received 2 challenge opportunities
1	"时候" (Sue Su)	Sue Su	782			Received 2 challenge opportunities
1	"笑红尘" (Sarah Chen)	Zeng Li	782			Received 2 challenge opportunities
Defenders Team
2	"跟着感觉走" (Su Rui)	Bibi Zhou (L)	774	395	Pass	Ranked 3rd
2	"跟着感觉走" (Su Rui)	Jike Junyi	774	356	Pass	Ranked 3rd
2	"跟着感觉走" (Su Rui)	Viann Zhang	774	329	Pass	Ranked 3rd
2	"跟着感觉走" (Su Rui)	Dong Jie	774	not disclosed	Eliminated	Ranked 3rd
2	"跟着感觉走" (Su Rui)	Xian Zi	774	not disclosed	Eliminated	Ranked 3rd
3	"逆光" (Stefanie Sun)	Natasha Na (L)	865	523	Pass	Ranked 2nd
3	"逆光" (Stefanie Sun)	Angel Wang	865	360	Pass	Ranked 2nd
3	"逆光" (Stefanie Sun)	Cecilia Cheung	865	291	Pass	Ranked 2nd
3	"逆光" (Stefanie Sun)	Sophia Hu	865	90	Pass	Ranked 2nd
3	"逆光" (Stefanie Sun)	Yang Yuying	865	178	Pass	Ranked 2nd
4	"孤寂者" (Li Ziming/想飞的鱼）	Joey Yung (L)	892	436	Pass	Ranked 1st; all members safe
4	"孤寂者" (Li Ziming/想飞的鱼）	Chen Xiaoyun	892	235	Pass	Ranked 1st; all members safe
4	"孤寂者" (Li Ziming/想飞的鱼）	Vivi Jiang	892	76	Pass	Ranked 1st; all members safe
4	"孤寂者" (Li Ziming/想飞的鱼）	Coco Lv	892	136	Pass	Ranked 1st; all members safe
4	"孤寂者" (Li Ziming/想飞的鱼）	Tifa Chen	892	79	Pass	Ranked 1st; all members safe
Challengers Team
5	"SHERO" (S.H.E.)	Monica Li (L)	826	273	Pass	Successfully Challenged 跟着感觉走 Team
5	"SHERO" (S.H.E.)	Jia Qing	826	not disclosed	Eliminated	Successfully Challenged 跟着感觉走 Team
5	"SHERO" (S.H.E.)	Jiang Luxia	826	124	Pass	Successfully Challenged 跟着感觉走 Team
5	"SHERO" (S.H.E.)	Michelle Chen	826	not disclosed	Eliminated	Successfully Challenged 跟着感觉走 Team
5	"SHERO" (S.H.E.)	Yuan Shanshan	826	87	Pass	Successfully Challenged 跟着感觉走 Team
Break-In Challenge Team
6	"BOOM (R3HAB Remix)" (Lay Zhang)	Rainie Yang	793	468	Break-In Successful	Successfully Challenged 跟着感觉走 Team
6	"BOOM (R3HAB Remix)" (Lay Zhang)	Sue Su	793	not disclosed	Break-In Unsuccessful	Successfully Challenged 跟着感觉走 Team
6	"BOOM (R3HAB Remix)" (Lay Zhang)	Zeng Li	793	not disclosed	Break-In Unsuccessful	Successfully Challenged 跟着感觉走 Team

=== Episode 8 (Mar 12, 2021) ===
For the 4th public performance, there will no longer be a division of Defenders and challengers team. The 17 sisters will be divided into two groups of 5 members and a group of 7 members. For the Defenders group, Joey Yung, whose team won 1st place last round, continues as one of the leaders while Bibi Zhou and Natasha Na, the contestants with the highest combined personal ranking, lead the remaining two teams. After the leaders pick their song choices, the remaining contestants pick their teams in order based on personal ranking, and are split into two 5-person group, and a one 7-person group. In the Breaktime group, Monica Li was voted to be leader of a 5-person group. During the pre-performance evaluation, each of the three teams selects one person to perform, and depending on their evaluation result, each team earns different amounts of time to campaign for votes.

4th Pre-Performance Evaluation Score
!小组	舞蹈	声乐	总分	排名
Natasha Na	35	41	76	2
Joey Yung	40	44	84	1
Rainie Yang	30	36	66	3

Part 1: Collaboration Show

Rules: Each team will send two members to perform (Lady Land). After the performance the audience will have 60 seconds to cast their vote to their favourite performance to 2 of the sisters but cannot vote the same member twice.

陈小纭 + 吕一 358 votes + 320 votes= 678 votes

胡静+ 吉克隽逸 350 votes + 370 votes= 720 votes

袁珊珊 + 杨钰莹 218 votes + 281 votes= 499 votes

Na Ying's team is currently in first place

Part 2: Singing aid competition

Rules: 6 sisters from season 1 will come to assist Na Ying's, Rainie's, Joey's team for this part. They were 郁可唯，阿朵，李斯丹妮，孟佳，蓝盈莹，王菲菲

Bazaar: 张柏芝，王鸥，杨丞琳，王菲菲，蓝盈莹 Total score: 915 votes

我对我：那英，周笔畅，李菲儿，孟佳，李斯丹妮 Total score: 873 votes

我管你：容祖儿，张馨予，蒋璐霞，江映蓉，郁可唯，阿朵，陈梓童 Total score: 816 votes

Total score of both rounds:

1st: 那英：1593 votes

2nd: 容祖儿: 1494 votes
