= Qingdao Broadcasting System =

Media company

Qingdao Broadcasting System (青岛市广播电视台) is a radio and television network based in Qingdao, Shandong. QBS operates seven radio stations and six television channels. Until 2025, it also operated China Food TV, a channel that also had presence in the United States.

== History ==
QBS originates from radio station XTGM, founded in June 1933, which became a part of the PLA-backed media backbone on 2 June 1949.

Television broadcasts started on 1 October 1971. Initially, in the 1970s, it was known as Qingdao Urban Television (青岛电视转播台), the name was changed to Qingdao Television (青岛电视台) in February 1976. After its formal establishment, it continued to have an agreement with China Central Television to provide footage. In 1999, it merged its second channel, an independent unit, into the existing station.

In 2009, it signed a memorandum of understanding with Dubai Media Incorporated. By 2010, it already operated six television channels.
