= Hang Yin (scientist) =

Chinese biochemist (born 1976)

Hang Hubert Yin
- Born: 5 July 1976 (age 50)
- Education: Yale University
- Scientific career
- Fields: Chemistry, Biology
- Workplaces: Tsinghua University

Hang Hubert Yin (born 5 July 1976) is a professor and deputy dean of pharmaceutical sciences at Tsinghua University, a recipient of several young scientist awards for his research in chemical biology and drug discovery.

== Career ==
Hang Hubert Yin was a pupil at the High School of Peking University. After studying for a bachelor's degree at the Peking University, he received his PhD from Yale University, New Haven in 2004 and then spent a post-doctoral period at the University of Pennsylvania School of Medicine under the supervision of Professor William DeGrado. In 2007, he joined the faculty of the University of Colorado Boulder. His research interests lie at the interface of chemistry, biology, and engineering with particular focuses on structure-based drug design, cell signaling biochemistry, biotechnology development, and membrane protein simulations.

== Awards ==
- American Chemical Society David W. Robertson Award for Excellence in Medicinal Chemistry (2016)
- CAPA Distinguished Junior Faculty Award (2012)
- Stand Up to Cancer Innovative Research Grant Award (2010)
- National Science Foundation CAREER Award (2010)
- American Association for Cancer Research Gertrude B. Elion Cancer Research Award (2009)
- University of Colorado New Inventor of the Year (2009)
- National Institute on Drug Abuse ECHEM Award (2009)
- National Institute on Drug Abuse CEBRA Award (2009)
- Sidney Kimmel Scholars Award (2008)
- Howard Hughes Medical Institute Collaborative Innovation Award (2008)

== Significant contributions ==
Yin's team showed that morphine causes inflammation by binding to the protein lymphocyte antigen 96, which, in turn, causes the protein to bind to an immune system receptor called Toll-like receptor 4 (TLR4). The morphine-induced TLR4 activation attenuates pain suppression by opioid and enhances the development of opioid tolerance and addiction, drug abuse, and other negative side effects such as respiratory depression. The Yin group has developed drug candidates that can improve opioid-based pain management therapies. On June 23, 2014, BioLineRx Ltd. (NASDAQ: BLRX; TASE: BLRX) announced that it has in-licensed BL-1010, a novel compound for the treatment of neuropathic pain invented by Yin from the University of Colorado. In 2015, Yin reported a new drug candidate that could change the way Parkinson's disease is treated. The drug, called CU-CPT22, may help stop harmful inflammation in certain immune cells that is thought to cause Parkinson's.

== Notes ==
- University of Colorado Cancer Center
- C&EN
- CU Art and Science Magazine
- Publications by Hang Hubert Yin
