= Mao Ning (singer) =

Chinese singer

- 毛宁
- Born: 23 May 1969 (age 57); Shenyang, Liaoning, China
- Education: Liaoning Sports Institute
- Occupation: Singer
- Years active: 1990–present
- Partner(s): Chen Hong; Yang Yuying; Lin Ping
- Musical career
- Genres: Mandopop
- Labels: New Era of Audio-Visual Company of Guangzhou (1990–1997); Sony Music Entertainment (1997–2004); 21 East Record Company (2004–)

Chinese name
- Traditional Chinese: 毛寧
- Simplified Chinese: 毛宁
Transcriptions
Standard Mandarin
- Hanyu Pinyin: Máo Níng

Mao Ning (Chinese: 毛宁; born 23 May 1969) is a Chinese singer best known for his pop numbers The Waves Remain, Late Autumn, and The Blue Night and Blue Dream. Mao Ning had many partners, such as Chen Hong, Yang Yuying and Lin Ping. Many people called Mao and Yang "The cutest boy and girl" (金童玉女).

== Biography ==
Mao Ning was born into a musical family in Shenyang, Liaoning, on 23 May 1969. When he was young, he decided to be an athlete, so he used become a soccer play with his strong body. He graduated from Liaoning Sports Institute. While he was injured with his leg, he had to give up the sport, and made the transition as a singer.

In 1987, Mao entered Liaoning Opera House. Mao Ning began his singing career in Guangzhou, capital of South China's Guangdong province, in 1990. That same year, he signed a contract with New Era of Audio-Visual Company of Guangzhou. His debut album, Please Let My Emotions Stay With You, was released in 1992, and in the same year, he won Favorite Male Singer of Guangdong Province.

Mao Ning first rose to prominence in 1993 for singing The Waves Remain in CCTV New Year's Gala. In 1994, Mao and his partner Yang Yuying made a cross-country tour. In 1995 he went to Beijing to develop his career. Two years later, he signed with Sony Music Entertainment and Shanghai Audio-Visual Press. In 1998 he was listed as one of "Four Top Stars". In November 2000, Mao got hurt accidentally and fell into the lowest point in life and career.

In 2003, Mao made his acting debut in Stories of the Wandering Hero, based on the novel by the same name by Liang Yusheng. In 2004, Mao signed with 21 East Record Company. In 2007 he became a member of the Hong Kong Buddhist Cultural Estate (HKBCE). His second solo album, titled Shi Er Zhong Mao Ning, was released in May 2012. In 2013, he worked as a judge at Your Face Sounds Familiar in Hunan Television. In August 2014, he hosted Dream Music Festival in Liaoning Television.

On 27 December 2015, he was arrested by the Beijing Municipal Public Security Bureau for drug use. He was released due to not meet to the detention conditions in December 2015.

== Singles ==
- The Waves Remain (涛声依旧)
- The Blue Night and Blue Dream (蓝蓝的夜蓝蓝的梦)
- How Many Loves Can Be That (能有几次这样的爱)
- The promise of Love (爱的承诺)
- Late Autumn (晚秋)
- The Big Wave Cover the Sand (大浪淘沙)
- Annie in Heart
- Wait You in Old Place

== Studio album ==
#	English title	Chinese title	Released	Label	Notes
1st	Please Let My Emotions Stay With You	请让我的情感留在你身边	1992	New Era of Audio-Visual Company of Guangzhou	
2nd	Waiting for Mao Ning	等待毛宁	1998	Sony Music Entertainment	
3rd	My Mind Was Empty	了无牵挂	1999	Sony Music Entertainment	
4th	Me	我	2004	21 East Record Company	
5th	Did You Go Home	你回家了吗	2009	21 East Record Company	
6th	Shi Er Zhong Mao Ning	十二种毛宁	2012	21 East Record Company	

== Television ==
Year	English title	Chinese title	Role	Notes
2003	Stories of the Wandering Hero	萍踪侠影	Moke	

== See also ==
- Yin Xiangjie (another singer arrested for drug use)
