= List of 2018 box office number-one films in China =

The following is a list of 2018 box office number-one films in China.

#	Date	Film	Gross	Notes
1	7 January 2018	The Ex-File 3: The Return of the Exes	US$86.9 million	
2	14 January 2018	The Ex-File 3: The Return of the Exes	US$76.6 million	
3	21 January 2018	Forever Young	US$49.8 million	
4	28 January 2018	Secret Superstar	US$40.7 million	
5	4 February 2018	Secret Superstar	US$26 million	
6	11 February 2018	Secret Superstar	US$18.8 million	
7	18 February 2018	Monster Hunt 2	US$200.3 million	
8	25 February 2018	Detective Chinatown 2	US$277.2 million	
9	4 March 2018	Operation Red Sea	US$144.4 million	
10	11 March 2018	Black Panther	US$70.4 million	
11	18 March 2018	Tomb Raider	US$43.6 million	
12	25 March 2018	Pacific Rim: Uprising	US$68.5 million	
13	1 April 2018	Ready Player One	US$65.0 million	
14	8 April 2018	Ready Player One	US$105.9 million	
15	15 April 2018	Rampage	US$58.4 million	
16	22 April 2018	Rampage	US$53.8 million	
17	29 April 2018	Us and Them	US$88.4 million	
18	6 May 2018	Us and Them	US$26.1 million	
19	13 May 2018	Avengers: Infinity War	US$191 million	
20	20 May 2018	Avengers: Infinity War	US$54 million	
21	27 May 2018	How Long Will I Love U	US$24 million	
22	3 June 2018	Doraemon the Movie: Nobita's Treasure Island	US$24 million	
23	10 June 2018	Toilet: Ek Prem Katha	US$9 million	
24	17 June 2018	Jurassic World: Fallen Kingdom	US$111 million	
25	24 June 2018	Jurassic World: Fallen Kingdom	US$34 million	
26	1 July 2018	Animal World	US$35 million	
27	8 July 2018	Dying to Survive	US$152 million	
28	15 July 2018	Dying to Survive	US$69 million	
29	22 July 2018	Skyscraper	US$48 million	
30	29 July 2018	Hello Mr. Billionaire	US$132 million	
31	5 August 2018	Hello Mr. Billionaire	US$66 million	
32	12 August 2018	The Island	US$77.9 million	
33	19 August 2018	The Island	US$38.9 million	
34	26 August 2018	Ant-Man and the Wasp	US$66.7 million	
35	2 September 2018	Mission: Impossible – Fallout	US$76.1 miilion	
36	9 September 2018	Mission: Impossible – Fallout	US$31.5 million	
37	16 September 2018	L Storm	US$29.3 million	
38	23 September 2018	Golden Job	US$22.9 million	
39	30 September 2018	Hello, Mrs. Money	US$15.5 million	
40	7 October 2018	Project Gutenberg	US$37.5 million	
41	14 October 2018	Project Gutenberg	US$20.7 million	
42	21 October 2018	Project Gutenberg	US$13.6 million	
43	28 October 2018	The Predator	US$19.5 million	
44	4 November 2018	The Nutcracker and the Four Realms	US$11.9 million	
45	11 November 2018	Venom	US$107.7 million	
46	18 November 2018	Venom	US$51.3 million	
47	25 November 2018	A Cool Fish	US$24.9 million	
48	2 December 2018	A Cool Fish	US$24.2 million	
49	9 December 2018	Aquaman	US$93.4 million	
50	16 December 2018	Aquaman	US$54.1 million	
51	23 December 2018	Spider-Man: Into the Spider-Verse	US$25.9 million	
52	30 December 2018	Kill Mobile	US$24.56 million	

== See also ==
- List of Chinese films of 2018
