= Fang County =

Fang County 房县
- County
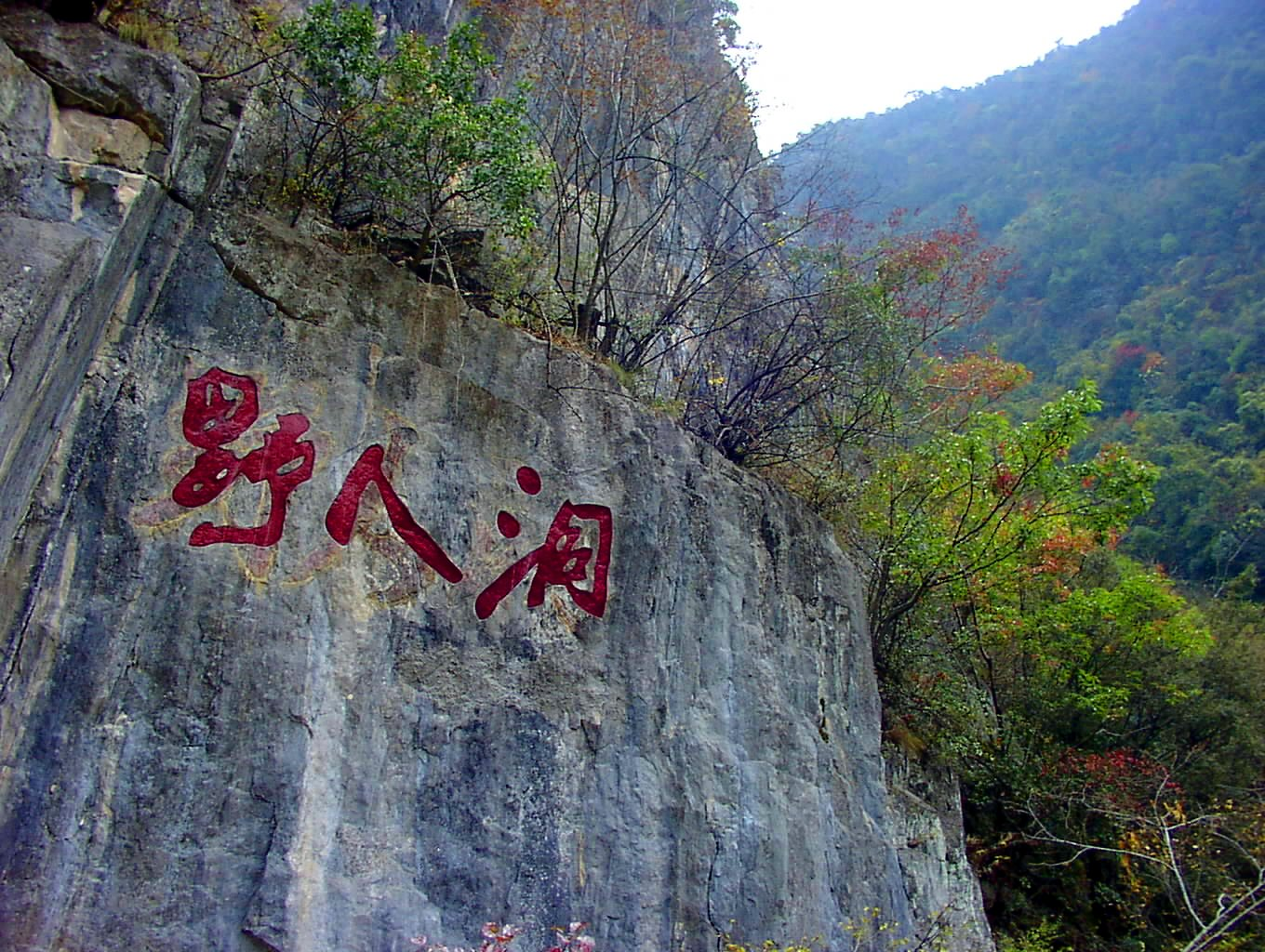
- Inscription in cliff face next to the entrance of the "Yeren Cave". The inscription reads "Ye Ren Dong" ("Wild Man Cave").

- Location in Hubei
- Coordinates: 32°06′N 110°36′E
- Country: People's Republic of China
- Province: Hubei
- Prefecture-level city: Shiyan

Area
  - Total: 5,110 km^{2} (1,970 sq mi)

Population (2020)
  - Total: 369,776
  - Density: 72.4/km^{2} (187/sq mi)
- Time zone: UTC+8 (China Standard)

Fang County or Fangxian (simplified Chinese: 房县; traditional Chinese: 房縣; pinyin: Fáng Xiàn) is a county of northwestern Hubei province, People's Republic of China. It is under the administration of Shiyan City.

The county spans an area of 5,110 square kilometres (1,970 mi^{2}), and has a population of 390,991 as of 2010.

== History ==
During the Spring and Autumn period, the region was known as Fangzhu (Chinese: 防渚; pinyin: Fángzhǔ).

During the Warring States period, the area belonged to the State of Chu.

The area was incorporated as Fangling County (simplified Chinese: 房陵县; traditional Chinese: 房陵縣; pinyin: Fánglíng Xiàn) during the Qin dynasty, where it belonged to the Hanzhong Commandery.

In 636 CE, the area of present-day Fang County was organized as Fang Prefecture.

In 1277, Fang Prefecture was changed to Fang County, which it has remained since. It was placed under the jurisdiction of Xiangyang Fu.

In 1476, Xiangyang Fu was changed to Yunyang Fu.

=== Republic of China ===
Upon the establishment of the Republic of China, the area was placed under the jurisdiction of Xiangyang Circuit.

In 1931, the area was re-organized as the 11th Administrative Inspectorate of Hubei Province. In 1936, it was changed to be under the 8th Administrative Inspectorate of Hubei Province.

=== People's Republic of China ===
In 1949, upon the establishment of the People's Republic of China, the area was administered under the Liangyun Prefecture.

The area was moved to the jurisdiction of the Yunyang Prefecture in 1965.

In 1994, the county was moved to the jurisdiction of the newly-formed prefecture-level city of Shiyan.

== Geography ==
The Wudang Mountains run through the northern part of Fang County, and the Daba Mountains run through its southern part.

The lowest part of the county is Jiangjiapo (Chinese: 姜家坡), in Damuchang, which stands 180 metres (590 ft) above sea level. The highest part of the county is Guanjiaya (Chinese: 关家垭), in Shangkan Township, which stands 2,485.6 metres (8,155 ft) above sea level.

== Climate ==
Climate data for Fangxian, elevation 427 m (1,401 ft), (1991–2020 normals, extremes 1981–present)
Month	Jan	Feb	Mar	Apr	May	Jun	Jul	Aug	Sep	Oct	Nov	Dec	Year
Record high °C (°F)	20.6 (69.1)	25.6 (78.1)	36.2 (97.2)	35.0 (95.0)	37.9 (100.2)	38.9 (102.0)	41.4 (106.5)	39.3 (102.7)	40.3 (104.5)	32.0 (89.6)	28.9 (84.0)	20.5 (68.9)	41.4 (106.5)
Mean daily maximum °C (°F)	8.5 (47.3)	11.6 (52.9)	16.9 (62.4)	23.0 (73.4)	26.6 (79.9)	30.0 (86.0)	32.0 (89.6)	30.9 (87.6)	26.4 (79.5)	21.3 (70.3)	15.7 (60.3)	10.2 (50.4)	21.1 (70.0)
Daily mean °C (°F)	2.4 (36.3)	5.1 (41.2)	9.9 (49.8)	15.7 (60.3)	19.9 (67.8)	23.8 (74.8)	26.1 (79.0)	25.1 (77.2)	20.7 (69.3)	15.3 (59.5)	9.3 (48.7)	4.0 (39.2)	14.8 (58.6)
Mean daily minimum °C (°F)	−1.7 (28.9)	0.6 (33.1)	4.7 (40.5)	10.2 (50.4)	14.9 (58.8)	19.1 (66.4)	22.2 (72.0)	21.3 (70.3)	17.0 (62.6)	11.5 (52.7)	5.2 (41.4)	0.0 (32.0)	10.4 (50.8)
Record low °C (°F)	−10.1 (13.8)	−8.8 (16.2)	−5.5 (22.1)	−1.0 (30.2)	2.9 (37.2)	11.3 (52.3)	13.7 (56.7)	13.3 (55.9)	6.6 (43.9)	−0.5 (31.1)	−4.6 (23.7)	−15.6 (3.9)	−15.6 (3.9)
Average precipitation mm (inches)	11.4 (0.45)	15.0 (0.59)	40.3 (1.59)	60.5 (2.38)	105.4 (4.15)	111.2 (4.38)	132.5 (5.22)	137.2 (5.40)	89.7 (3.53)	72.1 (2.84)	31.0 (1.22)	11.6 (0.46)	817.9 (32.21)
Average precipitation days (≥ 0.1 mm)	6.1	6.9	9.3	10.2	12.8	12.2	13.9	12.3	11.5	11.2	8.3	6.3	121
Average snowy days	5.6	3.9	1.8	0	0	0	0	0	0	0	1.1	3.3	15.7
Average relative humidity (%)	71	69	68	71	74	76	80	81	80	80	78	73	75
Mean monthly sunshine hours	111.4	109.3	145.7	164.7	175.3	173.3	188.4	177.7	129.5	117.1	112.9	116.8	1,722.1
Percentage possible sunshine	35	35	39	42	41	41	44	44	35	34	36	37	39
Source: China Meteorological Administration

== Administrative divisions ==
Fang County administers 12 towns and 8 townships.

Township-level divisions of Fang County
Name	Hanzi	Pinyin	Division type	Population (2010)
Chengguan	城关镇	Chéngguān Zhèn	Town	89,898
Jundian	军店镇	Jūndiàn Zhèn	Town	32,346
Hualongyan	化龙堰镇	Huàlóngyàn Zhèn	Town	20,163
Tucheng	土城镇	Tǔchéng Zhèn	Town	16,404
Damuchang	大木厂镇	Dàmùchǎng Zhèn	Town	26,828
Qingfeng	青峰镇	Qīngfēng Zhèn	Town	27,231
Mengusi	门古寺镇	Méngǔsì Zhèn	Town	26,488
Baihe	白鹤镇 (房县)	Báihè Zhèn	Town	28,435
Yerengu	野人谷镇	Yěréngǔ Zhèn	Town	9,638
Hongta	红塔镇	Hóngtǎ Zhèn	Town	31,367
Yaohuai	窑淮镇	Yáohuái Zhèn	Town	10,763
Yinjifu	尹吉甫镇	Yǐnjífǔ Zhèn	Town	7,261
Yaoping Township	姚坪乡	Yáopíng Xiāng	Township	13,008
Shahe Township	沙河乡	Shāhé Xiāng	Township	7,197
Wanyuhe Township	万峪河乡	Wànyùhé Xiāng	Township	6,917
Shangkan Township	上龛乡	Shàngkān Xiāng	Township	8,712
Zhongba Township	中坝乡	Zhōngbà Xiāng	Township	7,130
Jiudao Township	九道乡	Jiǔdào Xiāng	Township	8,675
Huilong Township	回龙乡	Huílóng Xiāng	Township	3,022
Wutai Township	五台乡	Wǔtái Xiāng	Township	3,268

=== Former divisions ===
In March 2012, Langkou Township (Chinese: 榔口乡; pinyin: Lángkǒu Xiāng) was abolished, and merged into the town of Yinjifu.

== Economy ==
Mineral deposits in the county include copper, iron, lead, zinc, phosphorus, sulfur, coal, and gypsum.

A number of large caves in Fang County also serve as tourist attractions.

== Transport ==
National Highway 209 runs through the county.
