= Yang Yuying =

Chinese singer (born 1971)

- Born: Yang Gangli; 11 May 1971 (age 55); Nanchang, Jiangxi, China
- Occupation: Singer
- Years active: 1990–1997, 2000–2006, 2012–present
- Partner(s): Mao Ning; Lai Wenfeng (1997–1999)
- Musical career
- Genre: Mandopop

Chinese name
- Simplified Chinese: 杨钰莹
- Traditional Chinese: 杨鈺莹
Transcriptions
Standard Mandarin
- Hanyu Pinyin: Yáng Yùyīng
- Wade–Giles: Yang^{2} Yü^{4}-ying^{1}
Yue: Cantonese
- Jyutping: Joeng^{4} Juk^{6}-jing^{1}

Birth name
- Simplified Chinese: 杨岗丽
- Traditional Chinese: 楊崗麗
Transcriptions
Standard Mandarin
- Hanyu Pinyin: Yáng Gǎnglì
- Wade–Giles: Yang^{2}Kang^{3}-li^{4}
Yue: Cantonese
- Jyutping: Joeng^{4} Gong^{1}lai^{6}

Yang Yuying (born Yang Gangli on 11 May 1971) is a Chinese singer known for the "sweet songs" that made her one of the most popular singers in mainland China in the early 1990s. She signed with the Guangzhou label New Era Audio and Video in 1990, and her 1992 album Wind and Love, Water and Smile sold a million copies in its year of release, a record for a mainland singer. Her best-known songs include "Tell You Lightly" and "The Heart Rain", a duet with Mao Ning, with whom she was marketed as a "golden boy and jade girl" pair.

== Early life ==
Yang Yuying was born on 11 May 1971 in Shigang, a village in what is now Xinjian District of Nanchang, Jiangxi. Her mother named her Yang Gangli after the village. Her father died when she was a child, and she and her elder sister were raised by their mother in poverty. She began performing at the age of six. According to Global People, she won first prize singing "Embroidering the Golden Plaque" at a Children's Day show put on by her neighbourhood kindergarten, and despite the family's hardship, her mother then enrolled her in a singing class at the Nanchang Children's Palace. In her fourth year of primary school, she was one of ten Young Pioneers chosen to represent Jiangxi at a national summer camp for outstanding children in Beijing. In 1985, she won second prize in a national children's singing contest held by China Central Television (CCTV), with the duet "A Winter's Fairy Tale". While at Nanchang No. 3 Middle School, she won first prize at the city's "Red Star Cup" youth singing contest.

In 1986, after finishing junior middle school, Yang entered the art class of Nanchang Normal School, where she studied folk-style singing. She had planned to become a kindergarten teacher, but one of her teachers told her, "You can't be a teacher. You should go and sing." After graduating, she joined the Jiangxi Song and Dance Troupe. In 1989, she moved to Guangzhou with the Jiangxi-born music producer Wu Songjin. After being turned down by several record companies, she shared lodgings with other young singers and supported herself by singing in dance halls. In 1990, she released her first album, How Much Do You Love Me, a collection of cover versions of songs by the Taiwanese singer Han Baoyi, under her birth name. It received advance orders for 180,000 cassettes.

== Career ==
=== Rise to fame (1990–1997) ===
In October 1990, Yang signed with Guangzhou New Era Audio and Video, becoming one of the first pop singers in mainland China to sign a contract with a record company. At the suggestion of the company's head, Wu Jianbang, she adopted the stage name Yang Yuying. She also studied singing under Professor Chen Xiaorong. Her first album of original songs, Blessings for Love, received advance orders for 200,000 copies at a national trade fair in Zhuhai in December 1990, and it was released in 1991.

Yang became a national star after she sang "Tea Mountain Love Song" and "Wind and Love, Water and Smile" on CCTV's Revolving Stage programme on 14 December 1991. Her 1992 album of the same name sold a million copies in its year of release, a record for an album by a mainland Chinese singer. Her theme song for the 1992 television series Girls from Outside, "I Don't Want to Say", also became widely popular. Her 1993 album Moon Boat, which included her signature song "Tell You Lightly", also sold a million copies, and the song's music video earned her the title of "Queen of Sweet Songs".

Yang was especially popular for her duets with the singer Mao Ning, who was also signed to New Era. The company paired the two, and they became popularly known as the "golden boy and jade girl". In 1997, while still at the height of her popularity, she withdrew from the music industry, saying that she was stepping back rather than giving up singing. In 1998, she published a beauty book, which sold more than 150,000 copies.

=== Yuanhua case controversy ===
In 1999, the smuggling case involving Lai Changxing's Yuanhua Group in Xiamen came to light. On 3 August 2002, on the Phoenix Television talk show A Date with Luyu, Yang disclosed that she had once been in a relationship with Lai's nephew, Lai Wenfeng. She said that the relationship had begun in 1994 and had lasted three years. The disclosure set off widespread media speculation about her links to the case.

In October 2002, the Xiaoxiang Morning Post quoted Lai Wenfeng's mother as saying that the couple had registered their marriage in Hong Kong in 1997. Yang denied this, saying that the two families had wanted them to marry but that they had never registered a marriage, and that their romantic relationship had begun to fade in 1997. In November, Lai's mother and sister supported Yang's account and said that the earlier reports were inaccurate.

=== Return to performing ===
In 2000, Yang joined a Shenzhen cultural company run by her elder sister, Yang Chenli, and released the album Story, but rumours connected with the Yuanhua case held back her career. After 2004, she rarely appeared in public, and she spent a year studying in Sydney, Australia.

Yang returned to the stage in early 2012 with the song "I'm Waiting for You in Spring". That year, she appeared as a guest on Shandong Television's music show Legend of Song. On 27 December 2012, she launched Encountering Jiangnan, her first album in nearly ten years, at an event in Beijing. In May 2013, she began hosting the Tianjin Television variety show Unique in the World, and the station later gave her a special award for her work on it. On her birthday, 11 May 2013, she gave her first concert since her return, The Best of Times, at the Jiangxi Gymnasium in Nanchang. The tour continued at the Guangzhou Gymnasium on 19 April 2014, where Mao Ning joined her to sing "The Heart Rain". In September 2014, it reached the Shuangliu Sports Centre stadium in Chengdu, her first concert in a stadium, where she sang "The Heart Rain" with the audience. In 2015, she taught young singers on the television music programme Music Master Class. In July 2016, she was appointed a guest professor in the music department of her former school, by then Nanchang Normal College.

In October 2019, the comedy I'm Waiting for You in Spring, in which Yang plays herself, was released on Tencent Video. It was her first film in 28 years, after Time Train. In 2021, she was a contestant on the second season of the reality competition Sisters Who Make Waves, and on 16 April she was one of the seven contestants who formed the group at the season's final. In August 2021, she became one of the hosts of the Mango TV music competition Call Me by Fire.

== Charity work ==
In May 2009, the master tape of Time Train, the only film in which Yang had appeared, was put up for auction online along with personal materials from the shoot, and part of the proceeds were to be donated to charity in her name. In July 2016, she donated 500,000 yuan to the Jiangxi Provincial Charity Federation to provide clean drinking water for flood victims and rescue workers.

== Fimography ==
Time Train was shot in 1991 and 1992. According to Wu Jianbang, the head of New Era, the label had agreed with a film company from another province to provide the film's score and theme song free of charge, on condition that Yang sang the theme, and she also made a cameo appearance in it. The music was completed and her scenes were filmed, but the film was never publicly released. Wu said that the contract had not specified any compensation if the film went unreleased, so the matter was dropped. Stills of Yang from the film surfaced online more than a decade later, in 2009.

== Discography ==
List of albums, with year of release and notes
Year	Title	Notes	Ref.
1990	90韩宝仪 爱我多深 Ài Wǒ Duō Shēn (How Much Do You Love Me)	Cover versions of songs by Han Baoyi, released under her birth name. Advance orders of 180,000 cassettes.	
1991	为爱祝福 Wèi Ài Zhùfú (Blessings for Love)	First album of original songs. Advance orders of 200,000 copies at a trade fair in Zhuhai in December 1990.	
1991	梦中花 Mèng Zhōng Huā (Flower in a Dream)		
1992	风含情 水含笑 Fēng Hán Qíng, Shuǐ Hán Xiào (Wind and Love, Water and Smile)	Sold one million copies in 1992, a record for a mainland Chinese singer.	
1992	情歌伴舞 Qínggē Bànwǔ (Love Songs for Dancing)		
1992	共醉共舞歌伴舞 Gòng Zuì Gòng Wǔ Gē Bànwǔ (Drunk Together, Dancing Together)		
1993	月亮船 Yuèliang Chuán (Moon Boat)	Includes "Tell You Lightly". Sold one million copies.	
1993	能有几次这样的爱 Néng Yǒu Jǐ Cì Zhèyàng de Ài (How Many Times Can There Be a Love Like This)	With Mao Ning	
1994	等你一万年 Děng Nǐ Yī Wàn Nián (Waiting Ten Thousand Years for You)		
1994	粤语金曲歌伴舞 Yuèyǔ Jīnqǔ Gē Bànwǔ (Cantonese Golden Hits for Dancing)		
1995	因为有你 Yīnwèi Yǒu Nǐ (Because of You)		
1996	一片艳阳天 Yī Piàn Yànyáng Tiān (A Sunny Day)		
1996	你带来一片温柔 Nǐ Dàilái Yī Piàn Wēnróu (You Bring Tenderness)		
2000	故事 Gùshì (Story)	Released through her sister's company in Shenzhen	
2002	妈妈留给我一首歌 Māma Liú Gěi Wǒ Yī Shǒu Gē (Mother Left Me a Song)		
2003	一段情 Yī Duàn Qíng (A Love Affair)		
2006	不了情 Bù Liǎo Qíng (Endless Love)		
2012	遇江南 Yù Jiāngnán (Encountering Jiangnan)	Her first album in nearly ten years, launched in Beijing on 27 December 2012	
