= Yin Depei =

Chinese association football player

Personal information
- Date of birth: 2 May 1991 (age 35)
- Position: Goalkeeper

Team information
- Current team: Qingdao Youth Island
- Number: 1

Senior career*
Years	Team	Apps	(Gls)
- Shandong Tengding
2016	Shaanxi Chang'an Athletic		
2018–	Qingdao Youth Island		
- * Club domestic league appearances and goals as of 14:01, 11 November 2021 (UTC)

Yin Depei (Chinese: 尹德沛; born 2 May 1991) is a Chinese footballer currently playing as a goalkeeper for Qingdao Youth Island.

== Career statistics ==
=== Club ===
As of 11 November 2021.

Club	Season	League			Cup		Continental		Other		Total	
Club	Season	Division	Apps	Goals	Apps	Goals	Apps	Goals	Apps	Goals	Apps	Goals
Qingdao Youth Island	2019	CCL	–		1 (Note: Appearances in the Chinese FA Cup)	0	–		0	0	1	0
Qingdao Youth Island	2020	China League Two	8	0	0	0	–		0	0	8	0
Qingdao Youth Island	2021	China League Two	9	0	2	0	–		0	0	11	0
Career total			17	0	3	0	0	0	0	0	20	0
