= Yin Mingshan =

Chinese businessman (born 1938)

Yin Mingshan (Chinese: 尹明善; pinyin: Yǐn Míngshàn; born 1938 in Chongqing, Sichuan) is a Chinese businessman. He was the chairman of Lifan Industrial Corporation, vice chairman of the Chinese civil association and the Chamber of Commerce, president of the Chinese motorcycle manufacturers. Upon the arrival of economic reforms in China and the opening up to first provincial-level officials of the Central Committee of the Chinese Communist Party, he took the leadership of the country's private entrepreneurs. According to Hurun Report's China Rich List 2013, he was the 335th richest person in China.

== Early life ==
During the Cultural Revolution in China, Yin spent nine and a half months as a punishment for his capitalistic tendencies. After his release he joined a publishing house.

== Lifan Group ==
In 1992, Yin Mingshan invested 200,000 yuan to found a motorcycle workshop which would become today's Lifan Group.
