= Yin Xiangjie =

Chinese Mandopop singer, host, and actor (born 1969)

- 尹相杰
- Born: February 15, 1969 (age 57); Fangshan District, Beijing, China
- Education: Beijing Yuying School
- Occupation: Singer
- Years active: 1989–present
- Musical career
- Genres: Mandopop
- Label: Warner Music

Chinese name
- Traditional Chinese: 尹相傑
- Simplified Chinese: 尹相杰
Transcriptions
Standard Mandarin
- Hanyu Pinyin: Yǐn Xiàngjié

Yin Xiangjie (born 15 February 1969) is a Chinese Mandopop singer, host, and actor. He rose to fame after singing "Boat Tracker's Love" at the Lantern Festival in Beijing Television in 1994, featuring fellow singer Yu Wenhua.

== Biography ==
Yin was born in Fangshan District of Beijing, on February 15, 1969, with his ancestral home in Lanshan District of Rizhao, Shandong.

After graduating from Beijing Yuying School in July 1987, he joined Beijing Advertising Art Troupe as a solo.

In 1988 he obtained third prize of National "Red Horse" Song Contest. In November 1989, he transferred to Chinese Broadcasting Art Troupe.

Yin Xiangjie recorded his first song About Us in 1992.

He first rose to prominence in 1994 for singing The Love Boat Tracker with Yu Wenhua at the Lantern Festival in Beijing Television. That same year, his debut RAP album, titled Changing Every Day, was released.

In 1995, his song, It isn't Raining Day with No Wind and the Sun in the Sky, which sung in the CCTV New Year's Gala, won a silver medal. In the same year, he began his acting career by appearing in small roles in several television series, such as Rainy Day Format, Magic Cube, and The Shopping Mall.

In 1996, he released the song Stealing the Moon To Light Up the Sky, and won a bronze medal at the MTV - China Music Video Contest.

In 1999, he performed the musical The Tortoise and the Hare in CCTV New Year's Gala.

In 2007, he was appointed as the publicity volunteer for an anti-drug campaign.

In May 2008, he took part in the "2008 Wenchuan Earthquake Relief Theme Party".

On June 15, 2010, he attended a large benefit concert with Lo Ta-yu and Stefanie Sun in Yinchuan, capital of northwest China's Ningxia Hui Autonomous Region.

In January 2012, he released his new song in the New Year's Gala in Tianjin Television.

On December 12, 2014, he performed at the Chinese Great Folk Songs in Hebei Television. But soon he was arrested on Christmas Day by Beijing Public Security Bureau for drug offences.

On November 12, 2015, he was arrested by Beijing police for illegal possession of drugs. It was his second arrest, both times on charges of illegally holding drugs.

== Personal life ==
Yin Xiangjie began dating Mandopop singer Xiao Yang (肖洋), who was more than twenty years his junior, in 2013. They broke up in the following year.

== Singles ==
- A Sunny Day
- The Love of Boat Trackers (or Boat Tracker's Love)
- Changing Every Day
- Stealing the Moon To Light Up the Sky
- Let Go of Our Love
- Affectionate Land
- My Son
- Me In the Big World

== Television ==
Year	English title	Chinese title	Role	Notes
1996	Stories in the Rainy Day	雨天有故事	Wan Shunda	
2004	Biography of Sister Ma	马大姐新传		
2004	Everybody Has Secrets	谁都有秘密		
2011	Dancing K – Line	舞动的K线	Jin Mancang	
