= Outline of cell biology =

Overview of and topical guide to cell biology

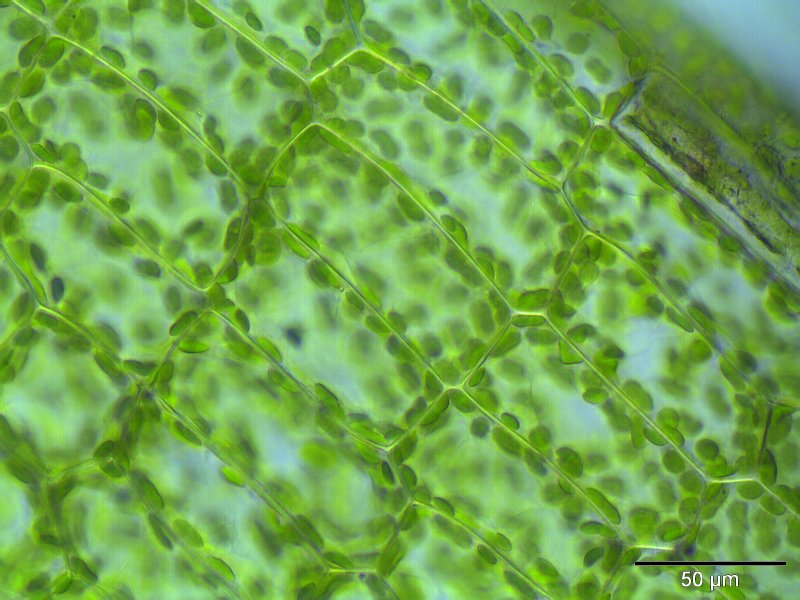
Light micrograph of a moss's leaf cells at 400X magnification

The following outline is provided as an overview of and topical guide to cell biology:

Cell biology – A branch of biology that includes study of cells regarding their physiological properties, structure, and function; the organelles they contain; interactions with their environment; and their life cycle, division, and death. This is done both on a microscopic and molecular level. Cell biology research extends to both the great diversities of single-celled organisms such as bacteria and the complex specialized cells in multicellular organisms such as humans. Formerly, the field was called cytology (from Greek κύτος, kytos, "a hollow;" and -λογία, -logia).

== A branch of science ==
Cell biology can be described as all of the following:

- Branch of science – A systematic enterprise that builds and organizes knowledge in the form of testable explanations and predictions about the universe.
  - Branch of natural science – The branch of science concerned with the description, prediction, and understanding of natural phenomena based on observational and empirical evidence. Validity, accuracy, and social mechanisms ensuring quality control, such as peer review and repeatability of findings, are among the criteria and methods used for this purpose.
    - Branch of biology – The study of life and living organisms, including their structure, function, growth, evolution, distribution, and taxonomy.
- Academic discipline – Focused study in one academic field or profession. A discipline incorporates expertise, people, projects, communities, challenges, studies, inquiry, and research areas that are strongly associated with a given discipline.

== Essence of cell biology ==
- Cell – The structural and functional unit of all known living organisms. It is the smallest unit of an organism that is classified as living, and also known as the building block of life. Cell comes from the Latin cellula, meaning, a small room. Robert Hooke first coined the term in his book, Micrographia, where he compared the structure of cork cells viewed through his microscope to that of the small rooms (or monks' "cells") of a monastery.
- Cell theory – The scientific theory which states that all organisms are composed of one or more cells. Vital functions of an organism occur within cells. All cells come from preexisting cells and contain the hereditary information necessary for regulating cell functions and for transmitting information to the next generation of cells.
- Cell biology – (formerly cytology) The study of cells.
- Cell division – The process of one parent cell separating into two or more daughter cells.
- Symbiogenesis – The evolutionary theory that certain eukaryotic organelles originated as separate prokaryotic organisms which were taken inside the cell as endosymbionts.
- Cellular respiration – The metabolic reactions and processes that take place in a cell or across the cell membrane to convert biochemical energy from fuel molecules into adenosine triphosphate (ATP) and then release the cell's waste products.
- Lipid bilayer – A membrane composed of two layers of lipid molecules (usually phospholipids). The lipid bilayer is a critical component of the cell membrane.

== Aspects of cells ==
- Homeostasis – The property of either an open system or a closed system, especially a living organism, that regulates its internal environment so as to maintain a stable, constant condition.
- Life – A condition of growth through metabolism, reproduction, and the power of adaptation to environment through changes originating internally.
- Microscopic – The scale of objects, like cells, that are too small to be seen easily by the naked eye and which require a lens or microscope to see them clearly.
- Unicellular – Organisms which are composed of only one cell.
- Multicellular – Organisms consisting of more than one cell and having differentiated cells that perform specialized functions.
- Tissues – A collection of interconnected cells that perform a similar function within an organism.
- Cellular differentiation – A concept in developmental biology whereby less specialized cells become a more specialized cell type in multicellular organisms.

== Types of cells ==
- Cell type – Distinct morphological or functional form of cell. When a cell switches state from one cell type to another, it undergoes cellular differentiation. There are at least several hundred distinct cell types in the adult human body.

=== By organism ===
- Eukaryote – Organisms whose cells are organized into complex structures enclosed within membranes, including plants, animals, fungi, and protists.
  - Animal cell – Eukaryotic cells belonging to kingdom Animalia, characteristically having no cell wall or chloroplasts.
  - Plant cell – Eukaryotic cells belonging to kingdom Plantae and having chloroplasts, cellulose cell walls, and large central vacuoles.
  - Fungal hypha – The basic cellular unit of organisms in kingdom fungi. Typically tubular, multinucleated, and with a chitinous cell wall.
  - Protist – A highly variable kingdom of eukaryotic organisms which are mostly unicellular and not plants, animals, or fungi.
- Prokaryote – A group of organisms whose cells lack a membrane-bound cell nucleus, or any other membrane-bound organelles, including bacteria.
  - Bacterial cells – A prokaryotic cell belonging to the mostly unicellular Domain Bacteria.
  - Archea cell – A cell belonging to the prokaryotic and single-celled microorganisms in Domain Archea.

=== By function ===
- Gamete – A haploid reproductive cell. Sperm and ova are gametes. Gametes fuse with another gamete during fertilization (conception) in organisms that reproduce sexually.
  - Sperm – Male reproductive cell (a gamete).
  - Ovum – Female reproductive cell (a gamete).
- Zygote – A cell that is the result of fertilization (the fusing of two gametes).
  - Egg – The zygote of most birds and reptiles, resulting from fertilization of the ovum. The largest existing single cells currently known are (fertilized) eggs.
- Meristemic cell – Undifferentiated plants cells analogous to animal stem cells.
- Stem cell – Undifferentiated cells found in most multi-cellular organisms which are capable of retaining the ability to reinvigorate themselves through mitotic cell division and can differentiate into a diverse range of specialized cell types.
- Germ cell – Gametes and gonocytes, these are often . Germ cells should not be confused with "germs" (pathogens).
- Somatic cell – Any cells forming the body of an organism, as opposed to germline cells.
- more...

== General cellular anatomy ==
- Cellular compartment – All closed parts within a cell whose lumen is usually surrounded by a single or double lipid layer membrane.
- Organelles – A specialized subunit within a cell that has a specific function, and is separately enclosed within its own lipid membrane or traditionally any subcellular functional unit.

=== Organelles ===
- Endomembrane system
- Endoplasmic reticulum – An organelle composed of an interconnected network of tubules, vesicles and cisternae.
  - Membrane bound polyribosome – Polyribosomes that are attached to a cell's endoplasmic reticulum.
  - Smooth endoplasmic reticulum – A section of endoplasmic reticulum on which ribosomes are not attached is termed as smooth endoplasmic reticulum. It has functions in several metabolic processes, including synthesis of lipids, metabolism of carbohydrates and calcium concentration, drug detoxification, and attachment of receptors on cell membrane proteins.
  - Rough endoplasmic reticulum – A section of the endoplasmic reticulum on with the protein manufacturing organelle i.e. ribosomes are attached is termed as rough endoplasmic reticulum which give it a "rough" appearance (hence its name). Its primary function is the synthesis of enzymes and other proteins.
  - Vesicle – A relatively small intracellular, membrane-enclosed sac that stores or transports substances.
  - Golgi apparatus – A eukaryotic organelle that processes and packages macromolecules such as proteins and lipids that are synthesized by the cell.
- Nuclear envelope – It is the double lipid bilayer membrane which surrounds the genetic material and nucleolus in eukaryotic cells. The nuclear membrane consists of two lipid bilayers:
  - Inner nuclear membrane
  - Outer nuclear membrane
  - Perinuclear space – Space between the nuclear membranes, a region contiguous with the lumen (inside) of the endoplasmic reticulum. The nuclear membrane has many small holes called nuclear pores that allow material to move in and out of the nucleus.
- Lysosomes – It is a membrane-bound cell organelle found in most animal cells (they are absent in red blood cells). Structurally and chemically, they are spherical vesicles containing hydrolytic enzymes capable of breaking down virtually all kinds of biomolecules, including proteins, nucleic acids, carbohydrates, lipids, and cellular debris. lysosomes act as the waste disposal system of the cell by digesting unwanted materials in the cytoplasm, both from outside of the cell and obsolete components inside the cell. For this function they are popularly referred to as "suicide bags" or "suicide sacs" of the cell.
- Endosomes – It is a membrane-bounded compartment inside eukaryotic cells. It is a compartment of the endocytic membrane transport pathway from the plasma membrane to the lysosome. Endosomes represent a major sorting compartment of the endomembrane system in cells.
- Cell nucleus – A membrane-enclosed organelle found in most eukaryotic cells. It contains most of the cell's genetic material, organized as multiple long linear DNA molecules in complex with a large variety of proteins, such as histones, to form chromosomes.
  - Nucleoplasm – Viscous fluid, inside the nuclear envelope, similar to cytoplasm.
  - Nucleolus – Where ribosomes are assembled from proteins and RNA.
  - Chromatin – All DNA and its associated proteins in the nucleus.
  - Chromosome – A single DNA molecule with attached proteins.
- Energy creators
  - Mitochondrion – A membrane-enclosed organelle found in most eukaryotic cells. Often called "cellular power plants", mitochondria generate most of cells' supply of adenosine triphosphate (ATP), the body's main source of energy.
  - Chloroplast – An organelles found in plant cells and eukaryotic algae that conduct photosynthesis.
- Centrosome – The main microtubule organizing center of animal cells as well as a regulator of cell-cycle progression.
- Lysosome – The organelles that contain digestive enzymes (acid hydrolases). They digest excess or worn-out organelles, food particles, and engulfed viruses or bacteria.
- Peroxisome – A ubiquitous organelle in eukaryotes that participates in the metabolism of fatty acids and other metabolites. Peroxisomes have enzymes that rid the cell of toxic peroxides.
- Ribosome – It is a large and complex molecular machine, found within all living cells, that serves as the site of biological protein synthesis (translation). Ribosomes build proteins from the genetic instructions held within messenger RNA.
- Symbiosome – A temporary organelle that houses a nitrogen-fixing endosymbiont.
- Vacuole – A membrane-bound compartments within some eukaryotic cells that can serve a variety of secretory, excretory, and storage functions.

=== Structures ===
- Cell membrane – (also called the plasma membrane, plasmalemma or "phospholipid bilayer") A semipermeable lipid bilayer found in all cells; it contains a wide array of functional macromolecules.
- Cell wall – A fairly rigid layer surrounding a cell, located external to the cell membrane, which provides the cell with structural support, protection, and acts as a filtering mechanism.
- Centriole – A barrel shaped microtubule structure found in most eukaryotic cells other than those of plants and fungi.
- Cluster of differentiation – A cell surface molecules present on white blood cells initially but found in almost any kind of cell of the body, providing targets for immunophenotyping of cells. Physiologically, CD molecules can act in numerous ways, often acting as receptors or ligands (the molecule that activates a receptor) important to the cell. A signal cascade is usually initiated, altering the behavior of the cell (see cell signaling).
- Cytoskeleton – A cellular "scaffolding" or "skeleton" contained within the cytoplasm that is composed of three types of fibers: microfilaments, intermediate filaments, and microtubules.
- Cytoplasm – A gelatinous, semi-transparent fluid that fills most cells, it includes all cytosol, organelles, and cytoplasmic inclusions.
- Cytosol – It is the internal fluid of the cell, and where a portion of cell metabolism occurs.
- Inclusions – A chemical substances found suspended directly in the cytosol.
- Photosystem – They are functional and structural units of protein complexes involved in photosynthesis that together carry out the primary photochemistry of photosynthesis: the absorption of light and the transfer of energy and electrons. They are found in the thylakoid membranes of plants, algae and cyanobacteria (in plants and algae these are located in the chloroplasts), or in the cytoplasmic membrane of photosynthetic bacteria.
- Plasmid – An extrachromosomal DNA molecule separate from the chromosomal DNA and capable of sexual replication, it is typically ring shaped and found in bacteria.
- Spindle fiber – The structure that separates the chromosomes into the daughter cells during cell division.
- Stroma – The colorless fluid surrounding the grana within the chloroplast. Within the stroma are grana, stacks of thylakoids, the sub-organelles, the daughter cells, where photosynthesis is commenced before the chemical changes are completed in the stroma.
- Thylakoid membrane – It is the site of the light-dependent reactions of photosynthesis with the photosynthetic pigments embedded directly in the membrane.

=== Molecules ===
- DNA – Deoxyribonucleic acid (DNA) is a nucleic acid that contains the genetic instructions used in the development and functioning of all known living organisms and some viruses.
  - DNA helicase
  - DNA polymerase
  - DNA ligase
- RNA – Ribonucleic acid is a nucleic acid made from a long chain of nucleotide, in a cell it is typically transcribed from DNA.
  - RNA polymerase
  - mRNA
  - rRNA
  - tRNA
- Proteins – Biochemical compounds consisting of one or more polypeptides typically folded into a globular or fibrous form, facilitating a biological function.
  - List of proteins
  - Enzymes – Proteins that catalyze (i.e. accelerate) the rates of specific chemical reactions within cells.
- Pigments
  - Chlorophyll – It is a term used for several closely related green pigments found in cyanobacteria and the chloroplasts of algae and plants. Chlorophyll is an extremely important biomolecule, critical in photosynthesis, which allows plants to absorb energy from light.
  - Carotenoid – They are organic pigments that are found in the chloroplasts and chromoplasts of plants and some other photosynthetic organisms, including some bacteria and some fungi. Carotenoids can be produced from fats and other basic organic metabolic building blocks by all these organisms. There are over 600 known carotenoids; they are split into two classes, xanthophylls (which contain oxygen) and carotenes (which are purely hydrocarbons, and contain no oxygen).

== Biological activity of cells ==
=== Cellular metabolism ===
- Cellular respiration –
  - Glycolysis – The foundational process of both aerobic and anaerobic respiration, glycolysis is the archetype of universal metabolic processes known and occurring (with variations) in many types of cells in nearly all organisms.
  - Pyruvate dehydrogenase – Enzyme in the eponymous complex linking glycolysis and the subsequent citric acid cycle.
  - Citric acid cycle – Also known as the Krebs cycle, an important aerobic metabolic pathway.
  - Electron transport chain – A biochemical process which associates electron carriers (such as NADH and FADH_{2}) and mediating biochemical reactions that produce adenosine triphosphate (ATP), which is a major energy intermediate in living organisms. Typically occurs across a cellular membrane.
- Photosynthesis – The conversion of light energy into chemical energy by living organisms.
  - Light-dependent reactions – A series of biochemical reactions driven by light that take place across thylakoid membrane to provide for the Calvin cycle reactions.
  - Calvin cycle – A series of anabolic biochemical reactions that takes place in the stroma of chloroplasts in photosynthetic organisms. It is one of the light-independent reactions or dark reactions.
  - Electron transport chain – A biochemical process which associates electron carriers (such as NADH and FADH_{2}) and mediating biochemical reactions that produce adenosine triphosphate (ATP), which is a major energy intermediate in living organisms. Typically occurs across a cellular membrane.
- Metabolic pathway – A series of chemical reactions occurring within a cell which ultimately leads to sequestering of energy.
- Alcoholic fermentation – The anaerobic metabolic process by which sugars such as glucose, fructose, and sucrose, are converted into cellular energy and thereby producing ethanol, and carbon dioxide as metabolic waste products.
- Lactic acid fermentation – An anaerobic metabolic process by which sugars such as glucose, fructose, and sucrose, are converted into cellular energy and the metabolic waste product lactic acid.
- Chemosynthesis – The biological conversion of one or more carbon molecules (usually carbon dioxide or methane) and nutrients into organic matter using the oxidation of inorganic molecules (e.g. hydrogen gas, hydrogen sulfide) or methane as a source of energy, rather than sunlight, as in photosynthesis.
- Important molecules:
  - ADP – Adenosine diphosphate (ADP) (Adenosine pyrophosphate (APP)) is an important organic compound in metabolism and is essential to the flow of energy in living cells. A molecule of ADP consists of three important structural components: a sugar backbone attached to a molecule of adenine and two phosphate groups bonded to the 5 carbon atom of ribose.
  - ATP – A multifunctional nucleotide that is most important as a "molecular currency" of intracellular energy transfer.
  - NADH – A coenzyme found in all living cells which serves as an important electron carrier in metabolic processes.
  - Pyruvate – It is the "energy-molecule" output of the aerobic metabolism of glucose known as glycolysis.
  - Glucose – An important simple sugar used by cells as a source of energy and as a metabolic intermediate. Glucose is one of the main products of photosynthesis and starts cellular respiration in both prokaryotes and eukaryotes.

=== Cellular reproduction ===
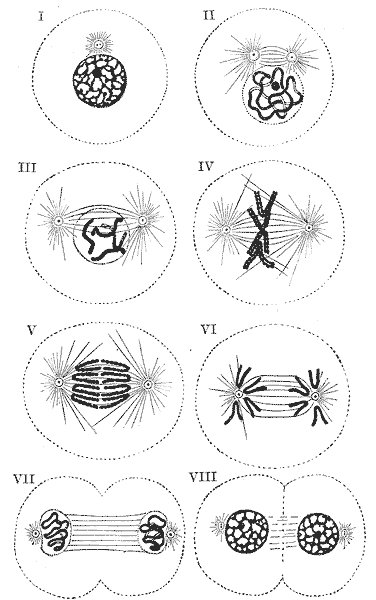
An illustration of the stages of mitosis in a human cell from Gray's Anatomy

- Cell cycle – The series of events that take place in a eukaryotic cell leading to its replication.
  - Interphase – The stages of the cell cycle that prepare the cell for division.
  - Mitosis – In eukaryotes, the process of division of the nucleus and genetic material.
    - Prophase – The stage of mitosis in which the chromatin condenses into a highly ordered structure called chromosomes and the nuclear membrane begins to break up.
    - Metaphase – The stage of mitosis in which condensed chromosomes, carrying genetic information, align in the middle of the cell before being separated into each of the two daughter cells.
    - Anaphase – The stage of mitosis when chromatids (identical copies of chromosomes) separate as they are pulled towards opposite poles within the cell.
    - Telophase – The stage of mitosis when the nucleus reforms and chromosomes unravel into longer chromatin structures for reentry into interphase.
  - Cytokinesis – The process cells use to divide their cytoplasm and organelles.
- Meiosis – The process of cell division used to create gametes in sexually reproductive eukaryotes.
  - Chromosomal crossover – (or crossing over) It is the exchange of genetic material between homologous chromosomes that results in recombinant chromosomes during sexual reproduction. It is one of the final phases of genetic recombination, which occurs in the pachytene stage of prophase I of meiosis during a process called synapsis.
- Binary fission – The process of cell division used by prokaryotes.
- Cell proliferation – Cell growth and cell division producing more identical cells. Often rapid.
- Asexual reproduction –

=== Transcription and translation ===
- Transcription – Fundamental process of gene expression through turning DNA segment into a functional unit of RNA.
- Translation – It is the process in which cellular ribosomes create proteins.
- mRNA
- rRNA
- tRNA
- Introns
- Exons

=== Miscellaneous cellular processes ===
- Cell transport
  - Osmosis – The diffusion of water through a cell wall or membrane or any partially permeable barrier from a solution of low solute concentration to a solution with high solute concentration.
  - Passive transport – Movement of molecules into and out of cells without the input of cellular energy.
  - Active transport – Movement of molecules into and out of cells with the input of cellular energy.
  - Bulk transport
    - Endocytosis – It is a form of active transport in which a cell transports molecules (such as proteins) into the cell by engulfing them in an energy-using process.
    - Exocytosis – It is a form of active transport in which a cell transports molecules (such as proteins) out of the cell by expelling them.
  - Phagocytosis – The process a cell uses when engulfing solid particles into the cell membrane to form an internal phagosome, or "food vacuole."
  - Tonicity – This is a measure of the effective osmotic pressure gradient (as defined by the water potential of the two solutions) of two solutions separated by a semipermeable membrane.
- Programmed cell death – The death of a cell in any form, mediated by an intracellular program (ex. apoptosis or autophagy).
  - Apoptosis – A series of biochemical events leading to a characteristic cell morphology and death, which is not caused by damage to the cell.
  - Autophagy – The process whereby cells "eat" their own internal components or microbial invaders.
- Cell senescence – The phenomenon where normal diploid differentiated cells lose the ability to divide after about 50 cell divisions.
- Cell signaling – Regulation of cell behavior by signals from outside.
- Cell adhesion – Holding together cells and tissues.
- Motility and Cell migration – The various means for a cell to move, guided by cues in its environment.
- Cytoplasmic streaming – Flowing of cytoplasm in eukaryotic cells.
- DNA repair – The process used by cells to fix damaged DNA sections.
- Glycosylation – The process by which glycosyltransferase enzymes attach complex, synthesized sugar chains (or glycans) to various polymers, creating glycoconjugates sucha as glycoproteins, glycopeptides, glycolipids, etc.

== Applied cell biology concepts ==
- Cell therapy – The process of introducing new cells into a tissue in order to treat a disease.
- Cloning – Processes used to create copies of DNA fragments (molecular cloning), cells (cell cloning), or organisms.
- Cell disruption – A method or process for releasing biological molecules from inside a cell.

=== Laboratory procedures ===
- Bacterial conjugation – Transfer of genetic material between bacterial cells by direct cell-to-cell contact or by a bridge-like connection between two cells. Conjugation is a convenient means for transferring genetic material to a variety of targets. In laboratories, successful transfers have been reported from bacteria to yeast, plants, mammalian cells and isolated mammalian mitochondria.
- Cell culture – The process by which cells are grown under controlled conditions, generally outside of their natural environment. In practice, the term "cell culture" now refers to the culturing of cells derived from multi-cellular eukaryotes, especially animal cells.
- Cell disruption, and cell unroofing – Methods for releasing molecules from cells.
- Cell fractionation – Separation of homogeneous sets from a larger population of cells.
- Cell incubator – The device used to grow and maintain microbiological cultures or cell cultures. The incubator maintains optimal temperature, humidity and other conditions such as the carbon dioxide (CO_{2}) and oxygen content of the atmosphere inside.
- Cyto-Stain – Commercially available mix of staining dyes for polychromatic staining in histology.
- Fluorescent-activated cell sorting – Specialized type of flow cytometry. It provides a method for sorting a heterogeneous mixture of biological cells into two or more containers, one cell at a time, based upon the specific light scattering and fluorescent characteristics of each cell.
- Spinning – Using a special bioreactor which features an impeller, stirrer or similar device to agitate the contents (usually a mixture of cells, medium and products like proteins that can be harvested).

== History of cell biology ==
See also Cell biologists below

History of cell biology – is intertwined with the history of biochemistry and the history of molecular biology. Other articles pertaining to the history of cell biology include:

- History of cell theory, embryology and germ theory
- History of biochemistry, microbiology, and molecular biology
- History of the optical microscope
- Timeline of microscope technology

== Cell biologists ==
- Karl August Möbius – In 1884 first observed the structures that would later be called "organelles".
- Bengt Lidforss – Coined the word "organells" which later became "organelle".
- Robert Hooke – Coined the word "cell" after looking at cork under a microscope.
- Anton van Leeuwenhoek – First observed microscopic single celled organisms in apparently clean water.
- Hans Adolf Krebs – Discovered the citric acid cycle in 1937.
- Konstantin Mereschkowski – Russian botanist who in 1905 described the theory of Endosymbiosis.
- Edmund Beecher Wilson – Known as America's first cellular biologist, discovered the sex chromosome arrangement in humans.
- Albert Claude – Shared the Nobel Prize in 1974 "for describing the structure and function of organelles in biological cells"
- Theodor Boveri – In 1888 identified the centrosome and described it as the 'special organ of cell division.'
- Peter D. Mitchell – British biochemist who was awarded the 1978 Nobel Prize for Chemistry for his discovery of the chemiosmotic mechanism of ATP synthesis.
- Lynn Margulis – An American biologist best known for her theory on the origin of eukaryotic organelles, and her contributions and support of the theory of symbiogenesis.
- Günter Blobel – An American biologist who won a Nobel Prize for protein targeting in cells.
- Peter Agre – An American chemist who won a Nobel Prize for discovering cellular aquaporins.
- Christian de Duve – Shared the Nobel Prize in 1974 "for describing the structure and function of organelles in biological cells"
- George Emil Palade – Shared the Nobel Prize in 1974 "for describing the structure and function of organelles in biological cells.”
- Ira Mellman – An American cell biologist who discovered endosomes.
- Paul Nurse – Shared a 2001 Nobel Prize for discoveries regarding cell cycle regulation by cyclin and cyclin-dependent kinases.
- Leland H. Hartwell – Shared a 2001 Nobel Prize for discoveries regarding cell cycle regulation by cyclin and cyclin-dependent kinases.
- R. Timothy Hunt – Shared a 2001 Nobel Prize for discoveries regarding cell cycle regulation by cyclin and cyclin-dependent kinases.

== Closely allied sciences ==
- Cytopathology – A branch of pathology that studies and diagnoses diseases on the cellular level. The most common use of cytopathology is the Pap smear, used to detect cervical cancer at an early treatable stage.
- Genetics – The science of heredity and variation in living organisms.
- Biochemistry – The study of the chemical processes in living organisms. It deals with the structure and function of cellular components, such as proteins, carbohydrates, lipids, nucleic acids, and other biomolecules.
  - Cytochemistry – The biochemistry of cells, especially that of the macromolecules responsible for cell structure and function.
- Molecular biology – The study of biology at a molecular level, including the various systems of a cell, including the interactions between DNA, RNA, and protein biosynthesis and learning how these interactions are regulated.
- Developmental biology – The study of the process by which organisms grow and develop, including the genetic control of cell growth, differentiation and "morphogenesis", which is the process that gives rise to tissues, organs, and anatomy.
- Microbiology – The study of microorganisms, which are unicellular or cell-cluster microscopic organisms as well as viruses.
  - Cellular microbiology – A discipline bridging microbiology and cell biology.

== See also ==
- Outline of biology
