= Carlos López =

Carlos López or Carlos Lopes may refer to:

== People named Carlos López ==
=== Sportspeople ===
- Carlos Lόpez (1912–1974), early in-ring name of Mexican professional wrestling legend Tarzán López
- Carlos López (equestrian) (1926–2023), Spanish equestrian
- Carlos Cuque López (born 1945), a long-distance runner from Guatemala
- Carlos López (baseball) (born 1948), Mexican baseball player
- Carlos Ángel López (1952–2018), Argentine footballer
- Carlos López (footballer, born 1970), Mexican football manager and former defender
- Carlos Javier López (born 1980), Argentine footballer
- Carlos López de Lerma (born 1984), Spanish footballer
- Carlos López (Chilean footballer) (born 1986), Chilean footballer
- Carlos López Huesca (born 1990), Spanish footballer
- Carlos López (footballer, born 1991), Mexican football goalkeeper for Juventud Antoniana
- Carlos López (soccer, born 1996), American soccer goalkeeper
- Carlos López (footballer, born 2004), Spanish football goalkeeper

=== Entertainers ===
- Carlos Lopez (dancer), former soloist, American Ballet Theatre
- Carlos López Avila (born 1973), known as Jeremías, Venezuelan singer and composer
- Carlos López Buchardo (1881–1948), Argentine composer
- Carlos López Estrada (born 1988), Mexican music video director
- Carlos López Moctezuma (1909–1980), Mexican film actor
- Carlos López y Valles (1887–1942), Mexican actor
- Carlos López Puccio (born 1946), Argentine musician, conductor and composer

=== Politicians ===
- Carlos López Bonilla, Puerto Rican politician and mayor of Rincón, Puerto Rico
- Carlos Lopez-Cantera, American politician
- Carlos López Contreras (born 1942), Honduran politician
- Carlos López Rivera (1958–2025), Puerto Rican politician and mayor of Dorado, Puerto Rico
- Carlos Antonio López (1790–1862), Paraguayan politician
- Carlos López Riaño (1940–2022), Spanish politician

=== Others ===
- Carlos López Bustamante (1890–1950), Venezuelan journalist
- Carlos Lopez (artist) (1908–1953), American painter
- Carlos Lopez (c. 1959–1984), Mexican murder victim in the 49th Street Elementary School shooting
- Carlos Lopez (stuntman) (1989–2014), American stunt performer
- Carlos López Lozano (born 1962), Bishop of the Spanish Reformed Episcopal Church since 1995
- Carlos F. López (born 1975), Colombian-American scientist

== People named Carlos Lopes ==
- Carlos Lopes (born 1947), Portuguese long-distance athlete, who won the marathon at the 1984 Los Angeles Olympics
- Carlos Lopes (parathlete), Portuguese Paralympian athlete
- Carlos Eduardo Lopes (born 1980), Brazilian footballer
- Carlos Lopes (Guinea Bissau) (born 1960), Executive Secretary of the Economic Commission for Africa of the United Nations

== Other uses ==
- Carlos A. López, a neighbourhood of Asunción, Paraguay

== See also ==
- Carlos Lopes (born 1947), Portuguese long-distance runner
- Carlos Lopes (parathlete) (active 1996–2008), Portuguese sprinter
