= Outline of life =

Outline of life may refer to:

- Outline of biology (the study of life and living organisms)
- Outline of life forms
- Outline of life science
