= Lei Lani Stelle =

Biologist

Academic background
- Education: UC Santa Cruz; University of British Columbia
- Alma mater: UCLA

Academic work
- Discipline: Biology
- Sub-discipline: Impact of humans on marine mammals
- Institutions: University of Redlands; Rochester Institute of Technology

Lei Lani Stelle is a professor of biology and chair of the Department of Biology at the University of Redlands.

== Education ==
Stelle earned a B.A. in marine biology from the University of California, Santa Cruz. She also earned an M.Sc. in zoology from the University of British Columbia and a Ph.D. in organismic biology, ecology, and evolution from the University of California, Los Angeles.

== Career ==
From 2001 to 2002, Stelle was a lecturer at the University of California, Los Angeles, and from 2002 to 2008 an assistant professor at Rochester Institute of Technology. She joined the University of Redlands as a professor of biology in 2008.

Stelle has taught courses in introductory biology, comparative animal physiology, marine ecology, marine mammal biology, and research. She has also led travel courses focused on marine conservation to Mexico, the Pacific Northwest, Canada, and Ecuador/Galápagos Islands.

=== Research ===
Stelle's research projects focus on the impact of humans on marine mammals in Southern California. Her studies include the distribution of blue whales, boat disturbance of sea lions, and behavior of dolphins. She is co-developer of an app called Whale mAPP that allows users to track sightings of marine mammals using GIS.

== Awards ==
- LENS Faculty Fellow, Keck Foundation, 2011
- American Association of University Women, American Fellow, 2006
- UCLA, James Memorial Dissertation Award, 2001

== Selected publications ==
- Stelle, L.L., King, M.* (2015) “Whale mAPP: Citizen Scientists Contribute and Map Marine Mammal Sightings”. Chapter in Ocean Solutions, Earth Solutions, ESRI Press, Redlands, CA.
- Stelle, L.L., Blake, R.W., and Trites, A.W. (2000) “Hydrodynamic Drag in Steller Sea Lions (Eumetopias jubatus)”. Journal of Experimental Biology, 203: 1915–1923.
