= Papanicolaou stain =

Histological staining method

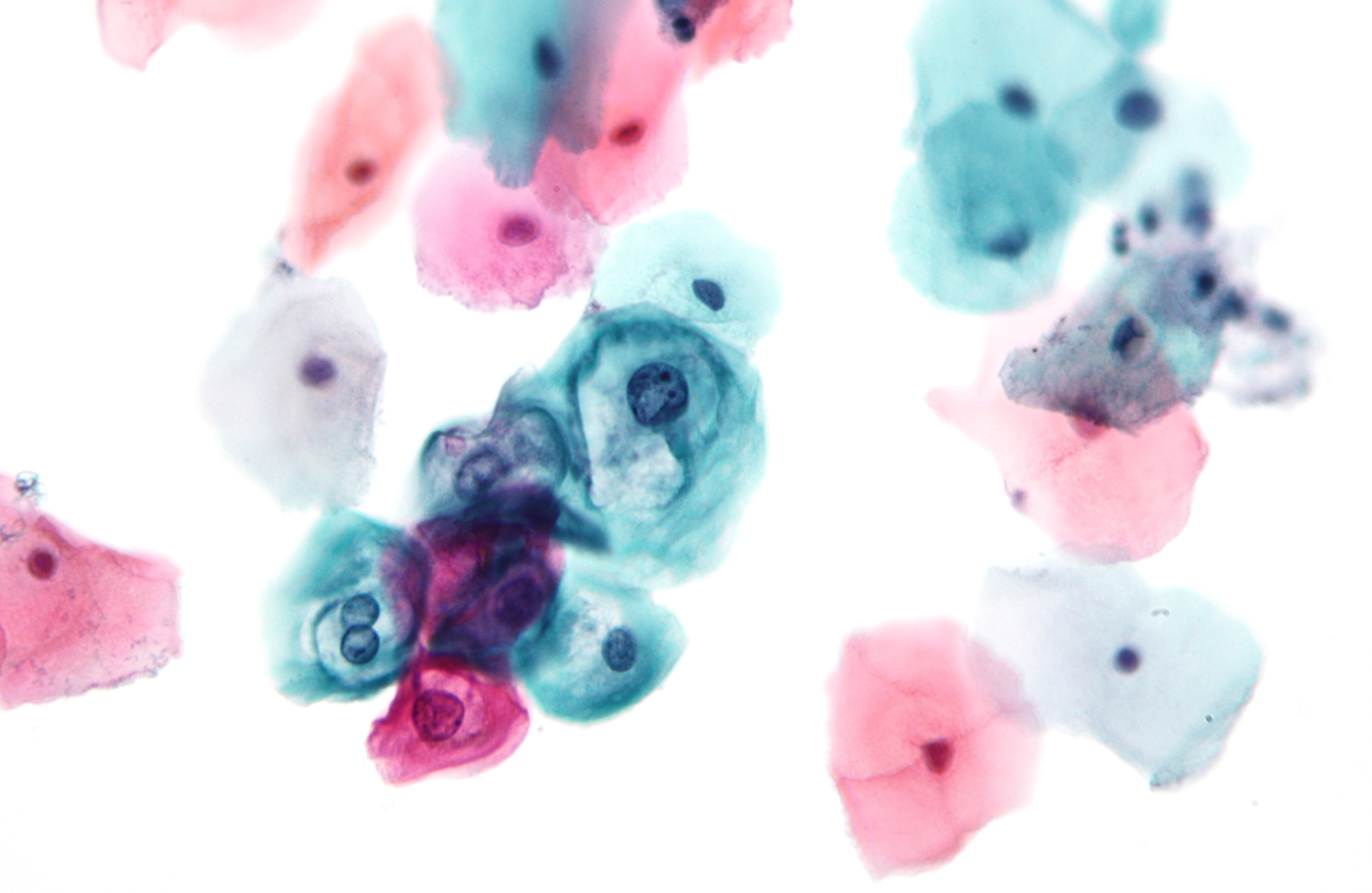
Papanicolaou stain showing a low-grade squamous intraepithelial lesion (LSIL) from a Pap test. Cell nuclei stained blue.

Papanicolaou stain (also Papanicolaou's stain and Pap stain) is a multichromatic (multicolored) cytological staining technique developed by George Papanicolaou in 1942. The Papanicolaou stain is one of the most widely used stains in cytology, where it is used to aid pathologists in making a diagnosis. Although most notable for its use in the detection of cervical cancer in the Pap test or Pap smear, it is also used to stain non-gynecological specimen preparations from a variety of bodily secretions and from small needle biopsies of organs and tissues. Papanicolaou published three formulations of this stain in 1942, 1954, and 1960.

== Usage ==
Pap staining is used to differentiate cells in smear preparations (in which samples are spread or smeared onto a glass microscope slide) from various bodily secretions and needle biopsies; the specimens may include gynecological smears (Pap smears), sputum, brushings, washings, urine, cerebrospinal fluid, abdominal fluid, pleural fluid, synovial fluid, seminal fluid, fine needle aspirations, tumor touch samples, or other materials containing loose cells.

The pap stain is not fully standardized and comes in several formulations, differing in the exact dyes used, their ratios, and the timing of the process. Pap staining is usually associated with cytopathology in which loose cells are examined, but the stain has also been modified and used on tissue slices.

=== Pap test ===
Pap staining is used in the Pap smear (or Pap test) and is a reliable technique in cervical cancer screening in gynecology.

== Generalized staining method ==
The classic form of the Papanicolaou stain involves five stains in three solutions.

- The first staining solution contains haematoxylin which stains cell nuclei. Papanicolaou used Harris's hematoxylin in all three formulations of the stain he published.
- The second staining solution (designated OG-6), contains Orange G in 95% ethyl alcohol with a small amount of phosphotungstic acid. In the OG-6, the OG signifies Orange G, and the '6' denotes the concentration of phosphotungstic acid added; other variants are OG-5 and OG-8).
- The third staining solution is composed of three dyes, Eosin Y, Light Green SF yellowish, and Bismarck brown Y in 95% ethyl alcohol with a small amount of phosphotungstic acid and lithium carbonate. This solution, designated EA, followed by a number that denotes the proportion of the dyes, other formulations include EA-36, EA-50, and EA-65.

The counterstains are dissolved in 95% ethyl alcohol which prevents cells from over staining which would obscure nuclear detail and cell outlines especially in the case when cells are overlapping on the slide. Phosphotungstic acid is added to adjust the pH of counterstains and helps to optimize the color intensity. The EA counterstain contains Bismarck brown and phosphotungstic acid, which when in combination, cause both to precipitate out of solution, reducing the useful life of the mixture.

== Results ==
The stain should result in cells that are fairly transparent so even thicker specimens with overlapping cells can be interpreted. Cell nuclei should be crisp, blue to black in color and the chromatin patterns of the nucleus should be well defined. Cell cytoplasm stains blue-green and keratin stains orange in color.

Eosin Y stains the superficial epithelial squamous cells, nucleoli, cilia, and red blood cells. Light Green SF yellowish confers a blue staining for the cytoplasm of active cells such as columnar cells, parabasal squamous cells, and intermediate squamous cells. Superficial cells are orange to pink, and intermediate and parabasal cells are turquoise green to blue.

== Ultrafast Papanicolaou stain ==
Ultrafast Papanicolaou stain is an alternative for the fine needle aspiration samples, developed to achieve comparable visual clarity in a significantly shorter time. The process differs in rehydration of the air-dried smear with saline, use 4% formaldehyde in 65% ethanol fixative, and use of Richard-Allan Hematoxylin-2 and Cyto-Stain, resulting in a 90-second process yielding transparent polychromatic stains.

== Examples of Papanicolaou stain ==
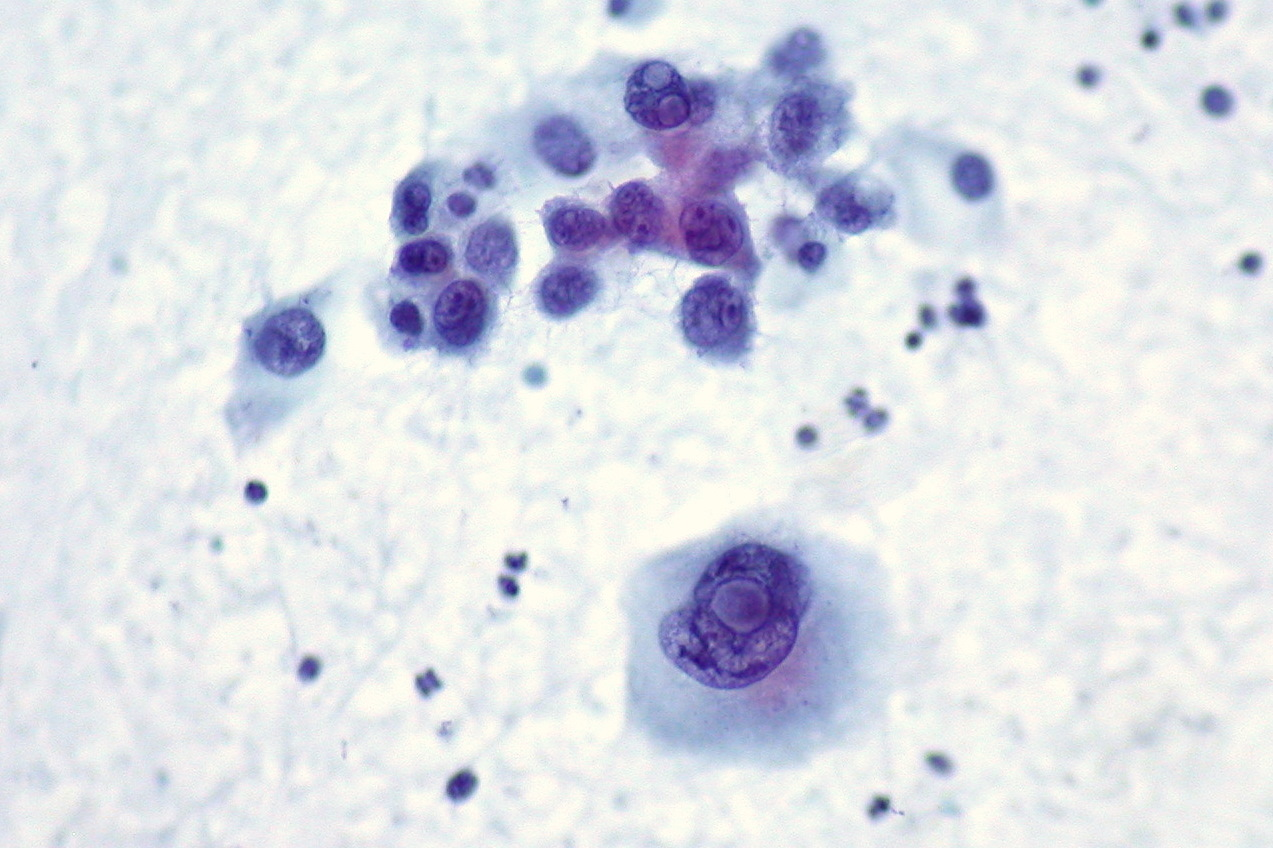
Melanoma, fine-needle aspiration biopsy of the liver, direct Smear.

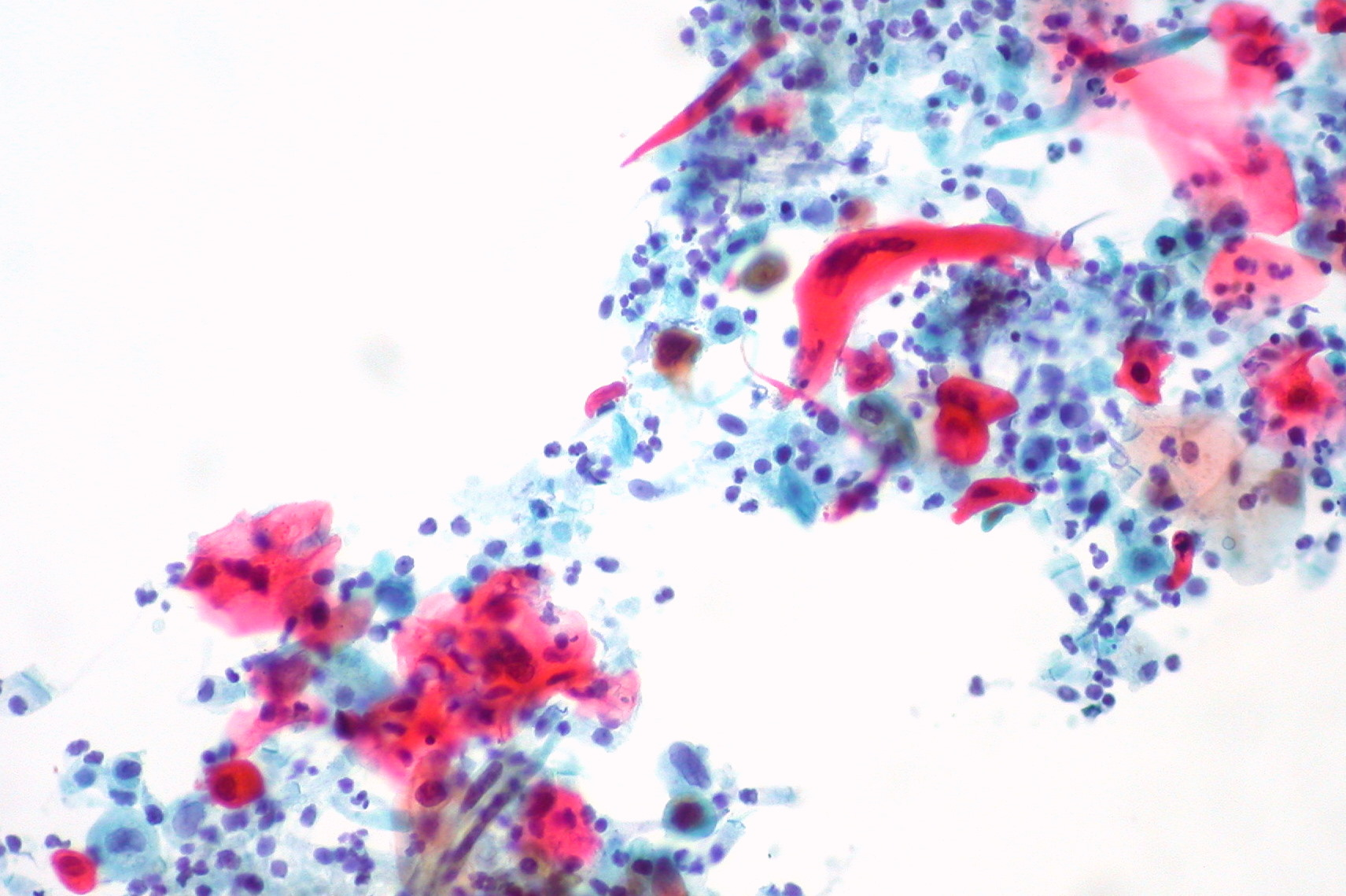
Squamous Cell Carcinoma, bronchial washing.

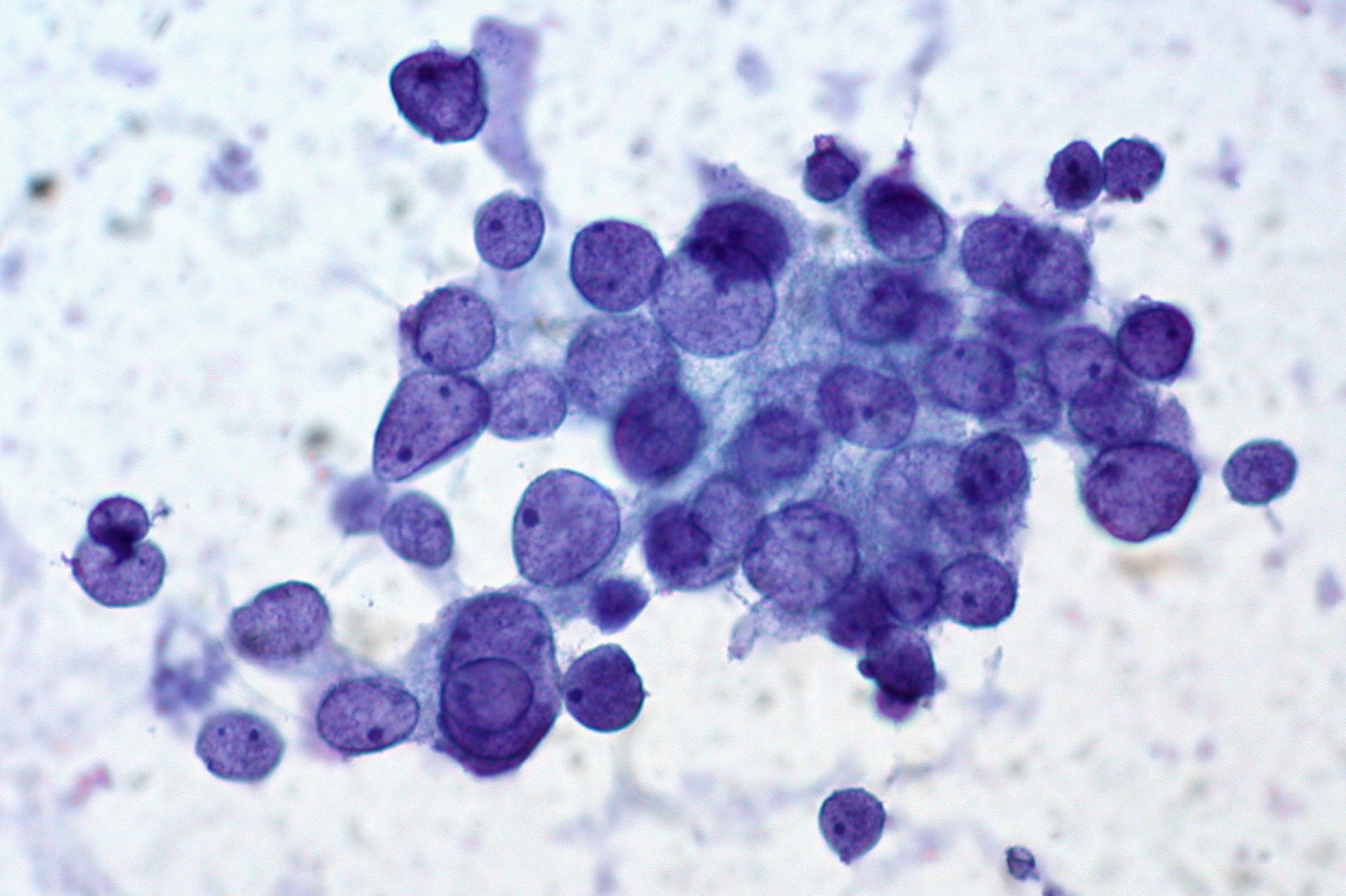
Papillary thyroid cancer, fine-needle aspiration biopsy.

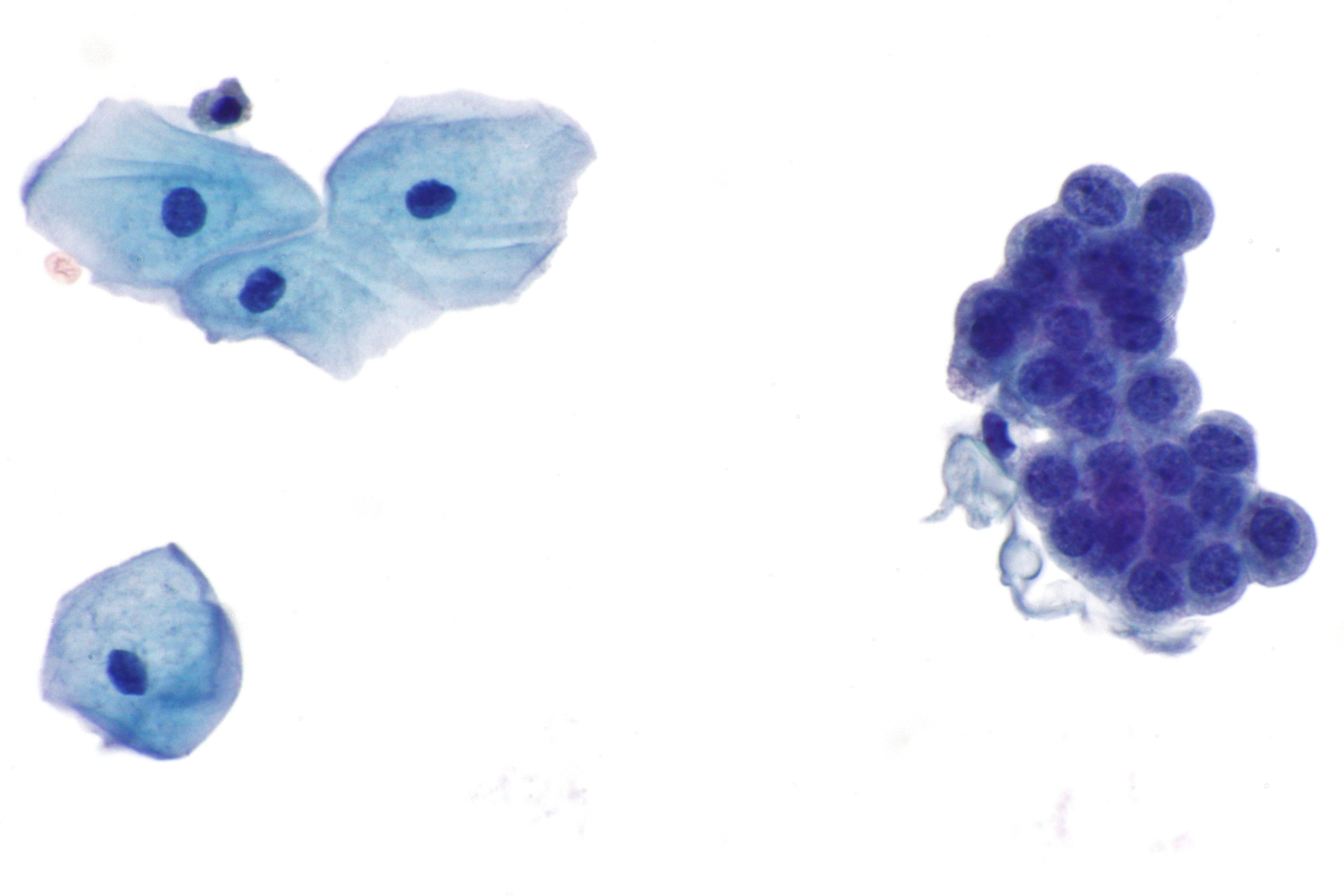
Benign urine cytology sample.

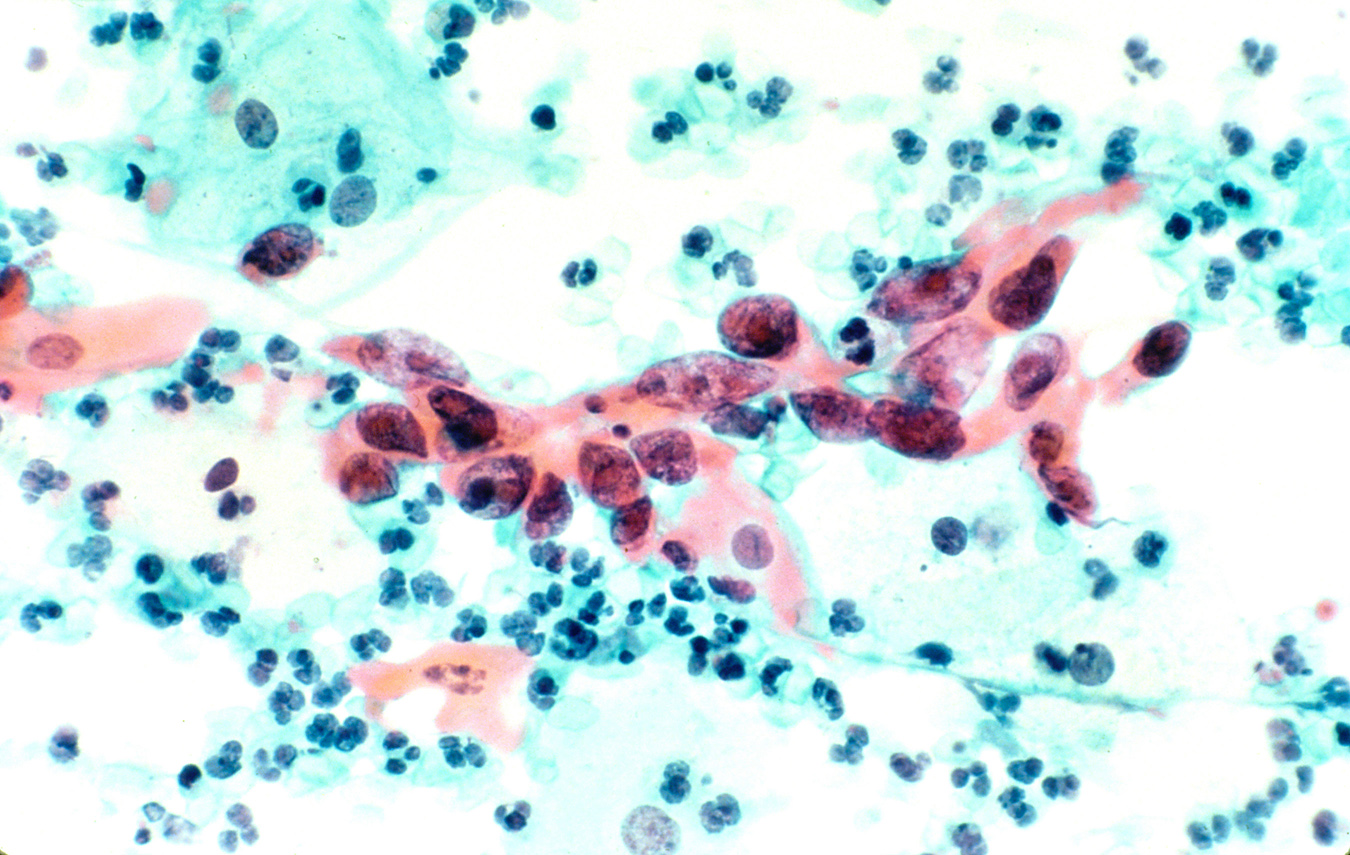
Squamous cell carcinoma in the cervix.

== Papers by George N. Papanicolaou describing his stain ==
- Papanicolaou, George N. "A new procedure for staining vaginal smears." Science 95.2469 (1942): 438–439.
- Papanicolaou, George N. "The cell smear method of diagnosing cancer." American Journal of Public Health and the Nation's Health 38.2 (1948): 202–205.
- Papanicolaou, George N. "Atlas of exfoliative cytology." Published for the Commonwealth fund by Harvard University Press. (1954).
- Papanicolaou, George N. "Memorandum on staining." Atlas of exfoliative cytology. Cambridge, MA: Harvard University Press, Supplement II (1960): 12.

== See also ==
- Diff-Quik— Romanowsky staining method commonly used in cytology
