= Carlos F. López =

Colombian-American scientist

Carlos Federico López Restrepo
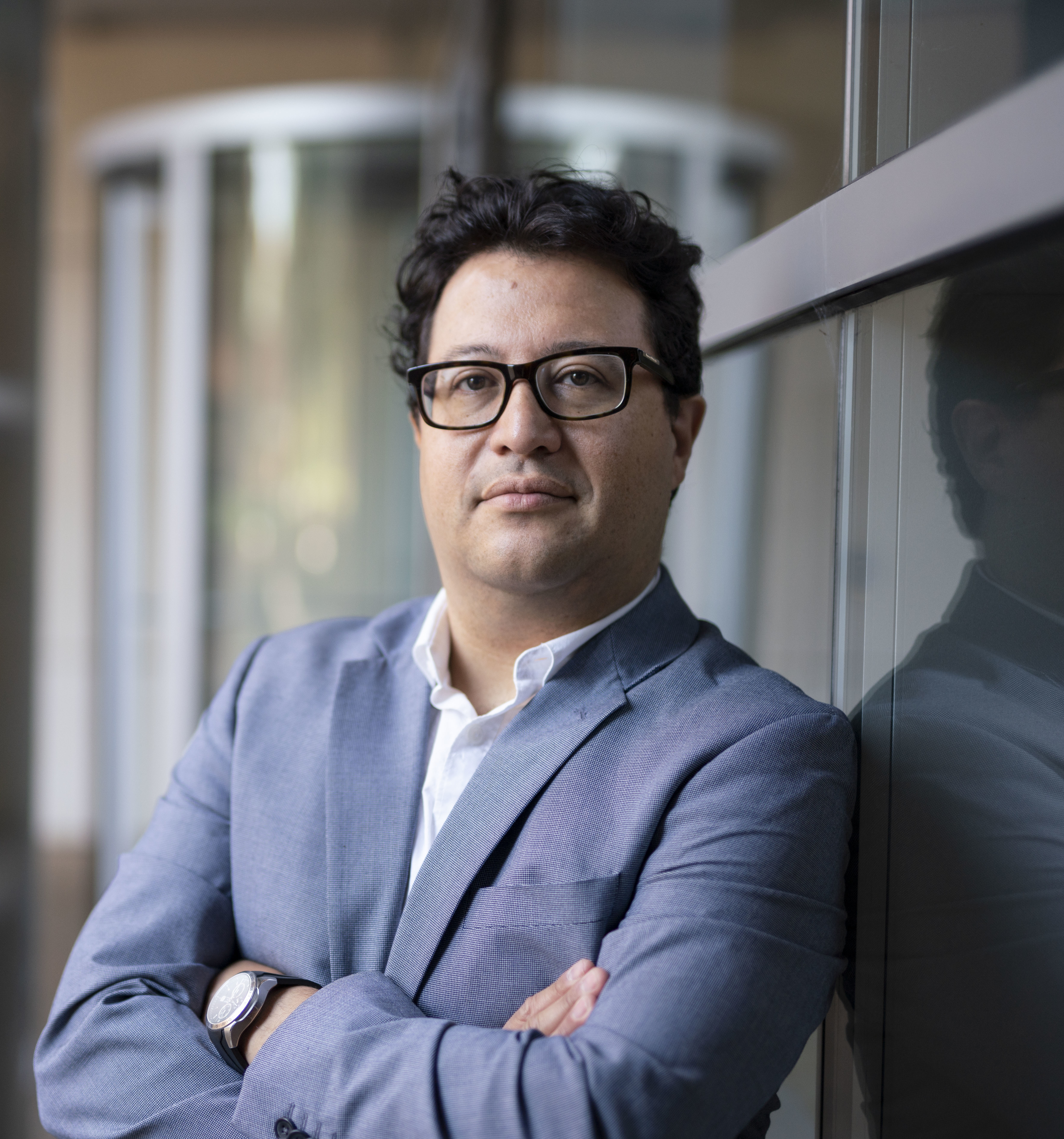
- López in 2019 at Vanderbilt University
- Born: 1975 (age 50–51); Bogotá, Colombia
- Education: B.Sc. in Chemistry/Biochemistry, B.L.A. in Liberal Arts 1998; Ph.D. in Physical Chemistry 2004
- Alma mater: University of Miami (Undergraduate); University of Pennsylvania (Graduate)
- Awards: National Science Foundation CAREER Award (2019); Vanderbilt CQS Pilot Award (2015); Vanderbilt Provost Office, Outstanding URM Faculty Accomplishments Award (2015); UK-US Consular Collaboration Development Award (2013)
- Scientific career
- Fields: Systems biology, Biophysics, Biochemistry, Computational Modeling, Mathematical Modeling, Biological Engineering
- Institutions: Altos Labs; Vanderbilt University; Harvard Medical School; Massachusetts Institute of Technology; University of Texas at Austin; University of Miami
- Thesis: Studies of membrane and membrane protein systems using molecular dynamics simulations (2004)
- Doctoral advisor: Michael L. Klein
- Other academic advisors: Jeffrey D. Evanseck; Peter J. Rossky; Peter K. Sorger

Carlos Federico López Restrepo (born 1975) is a Colombian-American scientist who researches network-driven biological processes using computational tools. Until March 2022, López was an associate professor of biochemistry and pharmacology and biomedical informatics and mechanical engineering at Vanderbilt University. He is currently a principal scientist and lead, multiscale modeling at Altos Labs.

== Early life and education ==
López was born in Bogotá, Colombia. He graduated from Colegio San Carlos, a primary and secondary private Catholic school in Bogotá.

López graduated from University of Miami with a B.Sc. in Chemistry and Biochemistry, and a B.L.A. in Liberal Arts in 1998. His early work was focused in Computational Chemistry using quantum mechanics simulations to study Diels-Alder reactions with Professor Jeffrey D. Evanseck.

In 2004, he obtained a Ph.D. in Physical Chemistry under the supervision of Michael L. Klein in the University of Pennsylvania. His work dealt with molecular simulations of membranes, membrane-proteins, and multiscale modeling of complex biophysical systems. His work with Michael L. Klein was highly influential in the growth of Coarse-grained modeling for molecular systems.

He was a postdoctoral fellow in chemistry at the Center for Computational Molecular Sciences of the University of Texas at Austin where he studied water-protein interactions and the hydrophobic effect in proteins with professor Peter J. Rossky.

Lopez then pursued a research fellowship in systems biology at the Harvard Medical School. He is also one of the main developers of the PySB modeling framework for systems biology cellular processes.

== Career ==
López is currently a principal scientist and lead for the Multiscale Modeling Group at Altos Labs, where he was recruited after spending ten years at Vanderbilt University. In his current role, he leads the modeling efforts at Altos including molecular, coarse grain, network dynamics, and cell population dynamics modeling. More recently his work has focused on Mechanistic Learning where he aims to combine data- and knowledge-driven models onto a common framework to explore complex cellular processes.

Lopez has made significant contributions to biological engineering through his innovative use of Multiscale modeling methods and Bayesian inference approaches to integrate experimental data with mathematical models. His research has advanced understanding in cellular and molecular mechanisms, emphasizing mechanistic details alongside probabilistic rigor. These approaches have been cited numerous times the study of network-driven biological processes and stochastic behaviors within cellular systems.

López was the lead of a namesake laboratory in Vanderbilt University in the department of biochemistry with the goal of “developing and applying numerical, modeling, and statistical methods to understand cellular processes and their dysregulation.”

Under his 2019 National Science Foundation CAREER award López investigated the underpinnings for essential biochemical processes. In 2017, he was named Vanderbilt’s liaison to Oak Ridge National Laboratory.

López has published more than fifty papers (according to Google Scholar) and has done numerous presentations in academic and scientific conferences. His work has been cited in thousands of publications.

In 2021 López was promoted to the rank of associate professor at Vanderbilt University. In 2022, López moved to Altos Laboratories to study cellular processes associated with aging.

== Software development ==
The López lab has contributed to various software tools used in systems biology including:

- PySB a modeling framework to encode cellular biochemical processes in Python.
- PyDREAM a Python implementation of the DREAM algorithm for Bayesian parameter inference.
- MAGINE a modeling framework for multi-omics data integration.
- PyViPR a visualization tool for dynamic biochemical processes with automated network resolution representation.

Other tools from the Lopez lab can be found at the Lopez lab website on GitHub.

== Advocacy ==
Lopez has been an advocate of underrepresented individuals in the sciences throughout his scientific career. He received multiple awards for his advocacy work during his tenure at Vanderbilt University, and he served as Chair of the Diversity Equity and Belonging committee in the Department of Biochemistry More recently, Lopez has served as a member of the American Society for Biochemistry and Molecular Biology Maximizing Access Committee from 2019-2024. Lopez has given multiple talks and participated in workshops discussing strategies to navigate careers in industry and academia for underrepresented individuals. He is currently a member of the Diversity Equity and Inclusion committee at Altos Labs.
