= Cyto-Stain =

Cyto-Stain, or CytoStain, is commercially available mix of staining dyes for polychromatic staining in histology. It provides results comparable to Papanicolaou staining, but in fewer operations and in shorter time. It is used in ultrafast Papanicolaou staining.

Cyto-Stain G is a modification of Cyto-Stain, producing greener cyanophilic hues in intermediate and basal cells.
