= Spinner (cell culture) =

Bioreactor that agitates

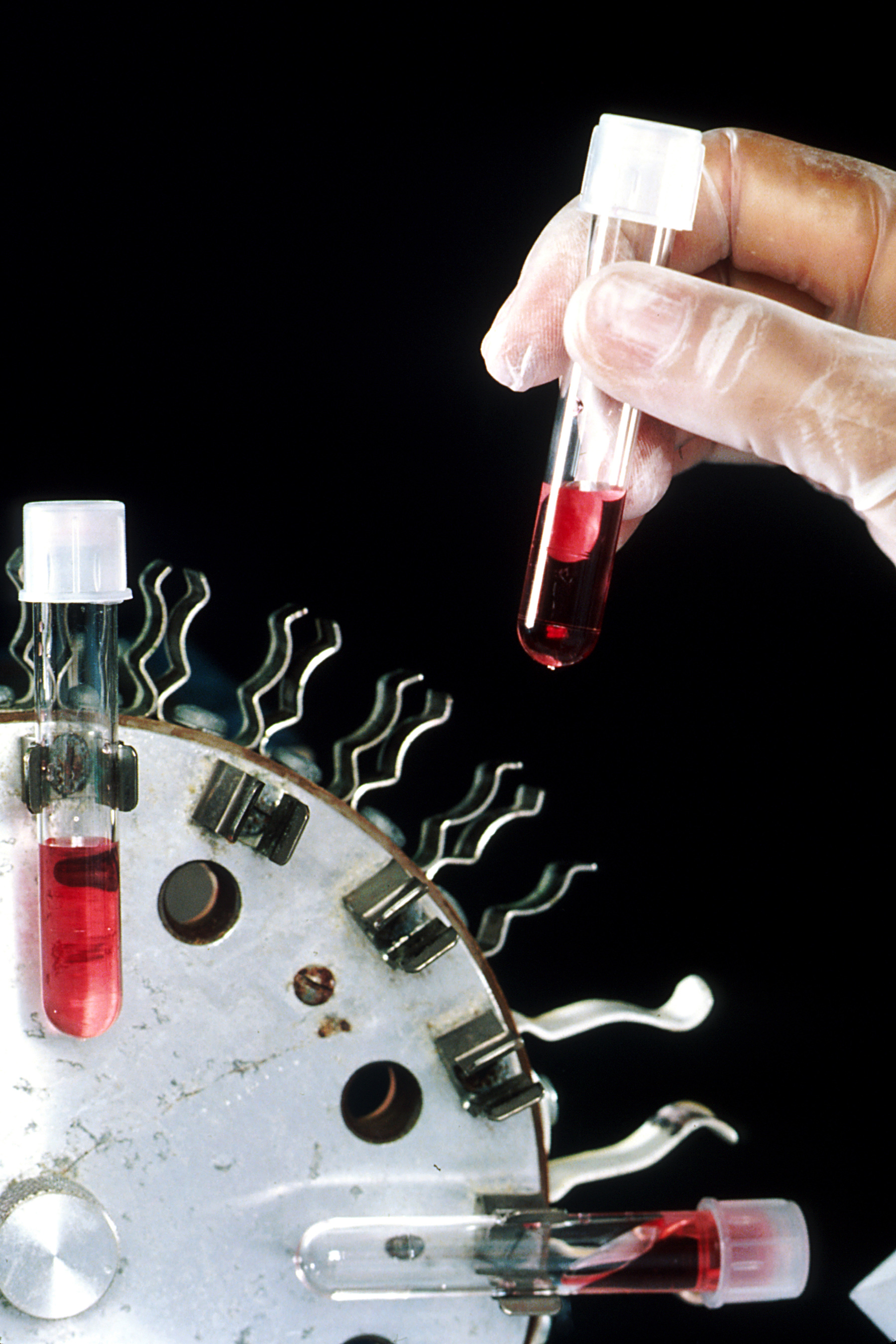
A spinner

A Spinner is a type of bioreactor which features an impeller, stirrer or similar device to agitate the contents (usually a mixture of cells, medium and products like proteins that can be harvested). The vessels are usually made out of glass or stainless steel with port holes to accommodate sensors, Medium input or gas flow.

Spinner type vessels are used for mammalian or plant cell culture. They are adequate for cell suspensions and attachment dependent cell types.

== See also ==
- Bioreactor
- Cell culture
- Cell culture techniques
- Bioprocess engineering
