= Carlos López (Chilean footballer) =

Chilean footballer (born 1986)

Personal information
- Full name: Carlos Alberto López Reyes
- Date of birth: 4 March 1986 (age 40)
- Place of birth: Viña del Mar, Chile
- Position: Midfielder

Senior career*
| Years | Team | Apps | (Gls) |
| 2006 | Everton | 3 | (0) |
| 2007 | Universidad de Chile | 5 | (0) |
| 2008 | Unión Quilpué | – | (–) |
| 2009–2011 | San Luis | 72 | (4) |
| 2012–2013 | Rangers | 37 | (0) |
| 2012 | Rangers B | 3 | (0) |
| 2013–2015 | San Luis | 51 | (1) |
| 2015–2016 | Ñublense | 19 | (0) |
| 2017 | Trasandino | 16 | (1) |
| Total | | 206 | (6) |
- * Club domestic league appearances and goals

Carlos Alberto López Reyes (born 4 March 1986) is a Chilean former professional footballer who played as a midfielder.

== Teams ==
- Everton 2006–2007
- Universidad de Chile 2007
- Unión Quilpué 2008
- San Luis de Quillota 2009–2011
- Rangers 2012–2013
- Rangers B 2012
- San Luis de Quillota 2013–2015
- Ñublense 2015–2016
- Trasandino 2017

== Titles ==
- San Luis de Quillota 2009 (Torneo Clausura Chilean Primera B Championship)
