= List of research methods in biology =

This list of research methods in biology is an index to articles about research methodologies used in various branches of biology.

== Research design and analysis ==
=== Research designs ===
Research design	Utility	Potential analysis
Between-group design	Experiment that has two or more groups of subjects each being tested by a different testing factor simultaneously	Student's t-test, Analysis of variance, Mann–Whitney U test
Repeated measures design	A research design that involves multiple measures of the same variable taken on the same or matched subjects either under different conditions or over two or more time periods.	Paired t-test, Wilcoxon signed-rank test

=== Charts and diagrams ===
Analysis	Utility	Branch
Dose–response curves	Graph that shows the magnitude of the response of an organism, as a function of exposure (or doses) to a stimulus or stressor (usually a chemical) after a certain exposure time	Physiology
Electroencephalogram	Graph that shows voltage fluctuations resulting from ionic current within the neurons of the brain	Neuroscience
Electrocardiogram	Graph of voltage versus time of the electrical activity of the heart using electrodes placed on the skin	Physiology
Identification key	Used to identify a specimen organism from a set of known taxa.	Systematics, Taxonomy
Manhattan plot	Used to display data with a large number of data-points, many of non-zero amplitude, and with a distribution of higher-magnitude values. The plot is commonly used in genome-wide association studies (GWAS) to display significant SNPs.	Genetics
Pedigree chart	Used to show the occurrence of phenotypes of a particular gene or organism and its ancestors from one generation to the next, most commonly humans, show dogs, and race horses	Genetics
Phylogenetic tree	Used to show the evolutionary relationships among various biological species or other entities based upon similarities and differences in their physical or genetic characteristics	Systematics, Evolutionary biology
Population pyramid	Used to illustrate the distribution of a population (typically that of a country or region of the world) by age groups and sex; it typically forms the shape of a pyramid when the population is growing	Population ecology
Punnett square	Used to predict the genotypes of a particular cross or breeding experiment	Genetics

=== Statistical analyses ===
Analysis	Utility	Type
Analysis of variance	A collection of statistical models and their associated estimation procedures (such as the "variation" among and between groups) used to analyze the differences among means	Statistical model
Chi-squared test	A statistical hypothesis test that is valid to perform when the test statistic is chi-squared distributed under the null hypothesis, specifically Pearson's chi-squared test and variants thereof	Statistical hypothesis test
Mann–Whitney U test	A statistical hypothesis test of the null hypothesis that, for randomly selected values X and Y from two populations, the probability of X being greater than Y is equal to the probability of Y being greater than X	Nonparametric statistics
Student's t-test	Any statistical hypothesis test in which the test statistic follows a Student's t-distribution under the null hypothesis	Parametric statistics

== Laboratory techniques ==
Method	Utility	Branches
Agarose gel electrophoresis	Used to separate a mixed population of macromolecules such as DNA or proteins in a matrix of agarose, one of the two main components of agar	Biochemistry, Molecular biology, Genetics
Animal Model	Used for researching diseases and disorders in humans. Some animals may have human-like traits, such as mice, while others may have traits that are ideal for research, such as the squid giant axon	Biochemistry, Neuroscience, Physiology
Biological ablation	Used to remove a biological structure or functionality	Genetics, Physiology
Calcium imaging	Used to optically measure the status of calcium ions (Ca^{2+}) in an isolated cell, tissue or medium	Physiology
Cell isolation	Process of separating individual living cells from a solid block of tissue or cell suspension	Cell biology
Centrifugation	Use of centrifugal force to separate particles from a solution according to their size, shape, density, medium viscosity, and rotor speed	Cell biology, Biochemistry
CRISPR gene editing	Used to modify the genomes of living organisms based on a simplified version of the bacterial CRISPR-Cas9 antiviral defense system	Molecular biology
DNA sequencer	Used to automate the DNA sequencing process	Genetics, Molecular biology
Enzyme-linked immunosorbent assay (ELISA)	Used to detect the presence of a ligand (commonly a protein) in a liquid sample using antibodies directed against the protein to be measure	Biochemistry, Molecular biology
Gene knockout	Used to make one of an organism's genes inoperative ("knocked out" of the organism)	Molecular biology, Genetics
Immunostaining	Used of an antibody-based method to detect a specific protein in a sample	Molecular biology, Biochemistry
Intracellular recording	Used to measure the voltage across a cell membrane	Neuroscience, Electrophysiology
Microarray	Assays (tests) large amounts of biological material using high-throughput screening miniaturized, multiplexed and parallel processing and detection methods	Genetics, Molecular biology
Microelectrode array	Devices that contain multiple (tens to thousands) microelectrodes through which neural signals are obtained or delivered, essentially serving as neural interfaces that connect neurons to electronic circuitry	Neuroscience
Microscope	Used to examine objects that are too small to be seen by the naked eye	Cell biology
Molecular cloning	Used to assemble recombinant DNA molecules and to direct their replication within host organisms.	Molecular biology
Northern blot	Used to study gene expression by detection of RNA (or isolated mRNA) in a sample.	Molecular biology
Optogenetics	Uses light to control neurons that have been genetically modified to express light-sensitive ion channels	Neuroscience
Oscilloscope	Used to graphically displays varying signal voltages, usually as a calibrated two-dimensional plot of one or more signals as a function of time	Neuroscience, Physiology
Paper chromatography	Used to separate coloured chemicals or substances.	Molecular biology
Patch clamp	Used to study ionic currents in individual isolated living cells, tissue sections, or patches of cell membrane	Electrophysiology, Neuroscience
Polymerase chain reaction (PCR)	Used to rapidly make millions to billions of copies (complete copies or partial copies) of a specific DNA sample, allowing scientists to take a very small sample of DNA and amplify it (or a part of it) to a large enough amount to study in detail	Genetics, Molecular biology
Somatic cell nuclear transfer	Used for creating a viable embryo from a body cell and an egg cell	Developmental biology
Southern blot	Used to detect specific DNA sequence in DNA samples	Molecular biology
Test cross	Used to determine whether an individual is homozygous or heterozygous dominant	Genetics
Voltage clamp	Used to measure the ion currents through the membranes of excitable cells, such as neurons, while holding the membrane voltage at a set level.	Physiology, Neuroscience
Western blot	Used analytical technique in molecular biology and immunogenetics to detect specific proteins in a sample of tissue homogenate or extract	Molecular biology
X-ray crystallography	Used to determine the atomic and molecular structure of a crystal, in which the crystalline structure causes a beam of incident X-rays to diffract into many specific directions	Structural biology

== Field techniques ==
Method	Utility	Branches
Distance sampling	Used for estimating the density and/or abundance of populations	Ecology
Mark and recapture	Used to estimate an animal population's size where it is impractical to count every individual.	Ecology

== Computational tools ==
=== Mathematical models ===
Model	Utility	Branches
Exponential integrate-and-fire	Describes compact and computationally efficient nonlinear spiking neuron models with one or two variables	Neuroscience
FitzHugh–Nagumo model	Describes a prototype of an excitable system (e.g., a neuron)	Neuroscience
Hardy–Weinberg principle	States that allele and genotype frequencies in a population will remain constant from generation to generation in the absence of other evolutionary influences	Genetics, Evolutionary biology
Hodgkin–Huxley model	Describes how action potentials in neurons are initiated and propagated	Neuroscience
Infinite sites model	Allows for the calculation of heterozygosity, or genetic diversity, in a finite population and for the estimation of genetic distances between populations of interest	Evolutionary biology
Logistic growth	Describes the growth of a population as exponential, followed by a decrease in growth, and bound by a carrying capacity due to environmental pressures.	Ecology
Lotka–Volterra equations	Describe the dynamics of biological systems in which two species interact, one as a predator and the other as prey	Ecology
Moran process	Stochastic process that describes finite populations	Genetics
Species–area relationship	describes the relationship between the area of a habitat, or of part of a habitat, and the number of species found within that area	Ecology

=== Algorithms ===
Algorithm	Utility	Branches
Evolutionary algorithm	Uses mechanisms inspired by biological evolution. Candidate solutions to the optimization problem play the role of individuals in a population, and the fitness function determines the quality of the solutions.	Neuroscience
