= Outline of biology =

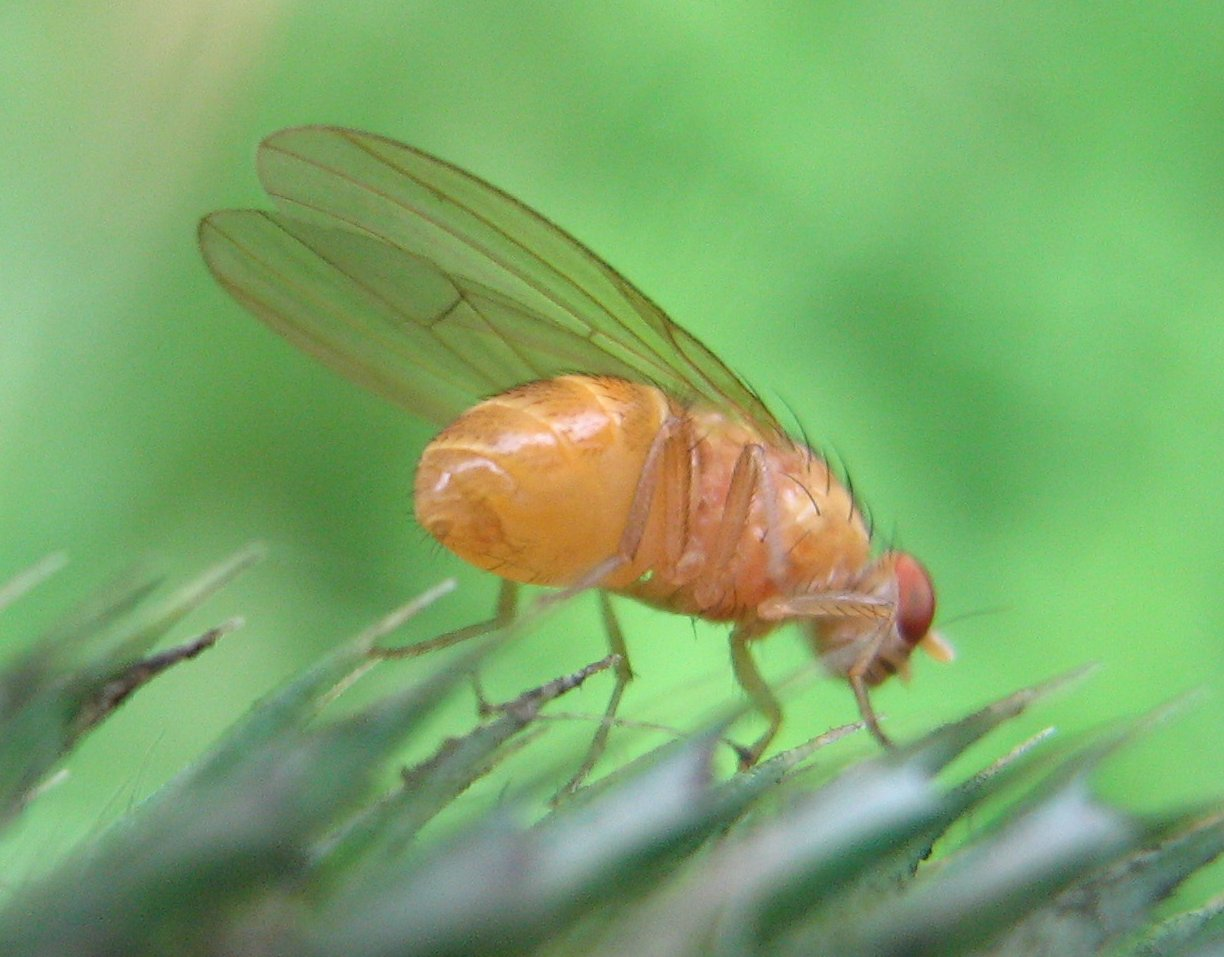
Drosophila melanogaster, commonly used as a model organism

The following outline is provided as an overview of and topical guide to biology:

Biology – The natural science that studies life. Areas of focus include structure, function, growth, origin, evolution, distribution, and taxonomy.

== History of biology ==
- History of anatomy
- History of biochemistry
- History of biotechnology
- History of botany
- History of ecology
- History of genetics
- History of evolutionary thought:
  - Darwinism
  - Eclipse of Darwinism (Lamarckism, Orthogenesis, Structuralism, and Mutationism)
  - Modern (evolutionary) synthesis
  - History of molecular evolution
  - History of speciation
- History of marine biology
- History of medicine
- History of model organisms
- History of molecular biology
- Natural history
- History of neuroscience
- History of plant systematics
- History of pathology
- History of virology
- History of zoology

== Overview ==
- Biology
  - Science
  - Life
    - Properties: Adaptation – Energy processing – Growth – Order – Regulation – Reproduction – Response to environment
  - Biological organization: atom – molecule – cell – tissue – organ – organ system – organism – population – community – ecosystem – biosphere
    - Approach: Reductionism – emergent property – mechanistic
- Biology as a science:
  - Natural science
  - Scientific method: observation – research question – hypothesis – testability – prediction – experiment – data – statistics
  - Scientific theory – scientific law
- Research method
  - List of research methods in biology
- Scientific literature
  - List of biology journals: peer review

== Chemical basis ==
Outline of biochemistry

- Atoms and molecules
  - matter – element – atom – proton – neutron – electron– Bohr model – isotope – chemical bond – ionic bond – ions – covalent bond – hydrogen bond – molecule
- Water:
  - properties of water – solvent – cohesion – adhesion – surface tension – pH
- Organic compounds:
  - carbon – carbon-carbon bonds – hydrocarbon – monosaccharide – amino acids – nucleotide – functional group – monomer – adenosine triphosphate (ATP) – lipids – oil – sugar – vitamins – neurotransmitter – wax
- Macromolecules:
  - polysaccharide: cellulose – carbohydrate – chitin – glycogen – starch
  - proteins: primary structure – secondary structure – tertiary structure – conformation – native state – protein folding – enzyme – receptor – transmembrane receptor – ion channel – membrane transporter – collagen – pigments: chlorophyll – carotenoid – xanthophyll – melanin – prion
  - lipids: cell membrane – fats – phospholipids
  - nucleic acids: DNA – RNA

== Cells ==
Outline of cell biology

- Cell structure:
  - Cell coined by Robert Hooke
  - Techniques: cell culture – flow cytometry – microscope – light microscope – electron microscopy – SEM – TEM – live cell imaging
  - Organelles: Cytoplasm – Vacuole – Peroxisome – Plastid
    - Cell nucleus
      - Nucleoplasm – Nucleolus – Chromatin – Chromosome
    - Endomembrane system
      - Nuclear envelope – Endoplasmic reticulum – Golgi apparatus – Vesicles – Lysosome
    - Energy creators: Mitochondrion and Chloroplast
  - Biological membranes:
    - Plasma membrane – Mitochondrial membrane – Chloroplast membrane
  - Other subcellular features: Cell wall – pseudopod – cytoskeleton – mitotic spindle – flagellum – cilium
    - Cell transport: Diffusion – Osmosis – isotonic – active transport – phagocytosis
    - Cellular reproduction: cytokinesis – centromere – meiosis
    - Nuclear reproduction: mitosis – interphase – prophase – metaphase – anaphase – telophase
    - programmed cell death – apoptosis – cell senescence
- Metabolism:
    - enzyme - activation energy - proteolysis – cooperativity
- Cellular respiration
    - Glycolysis – Pyruvate dehydrogenase complex – Citric acid cycle – electron transport chain – fermentation
- Photosynthesis
    - light-dependent reactions – Calvin cycle
- Cell cycle
  - mitosis – chromosome – haploid – diploid – polyploidy – prophase – metaphase – anaphase – telophase – cytokinesis – meiosis

== Genetics ==
Outline of Genetics

- Inheritance
  - heredity – Mendelian inheritance – gene – locus – trait – allele – polymorphism – homozygote – heterozygote – hybrid – hybridization – dihybrid cross – Punnett square – inbreeding
  - genotype–phenotype distinction – genotype – phenotype – dominant gene – recessive gene
  - genetic interactions – Mendel's law of segregation – genetic mosaic – maternal effect – penetrance – complementation – suppression – epistasis – genetic linkage
  - Model organisms: Drosophila – Arabidopsis – Caenorhabditis elegans – mouse – Saccharomyces cerevisiae – Escherichia coli – Lambda phage – Xenopus – chicken – zebrafish – Ciona intestinalis – amphioxus
  - Techniques: genetic screen – linkage map – genetic map
- DNA
  - Nucleic acid double helix
  - Nucleobase: adenine (A) – cytosine (C) – guanine (G) – thymine (T) – uracil (U)
  - DNA replication – mutation – mutation rate – proofreading – DNA mismatch repair – point mutation – crossover – recombination – plasmid – transposon
- Gene expression
  - Central dogma of molecular biology: nucleosome – genetic code – codon – transcription factor – transcription – translation – RNA – histone – telomere
  - heterochromatin – promoter – RNA polymerase
  - Protein biosynthesis – ribosomes
- Gene regulation
  - operon – activator – repressor – corepressor – enhancer – alternative splicing
- Genomes
  - DNA sequencing – high throughput sequencing – bioinformatics
  - Proteome – proteomics – metabolome – metabolomics
  - DNA paternity testing
- Biotechnology (see also Outline of biochemical techniques and Molecular biology):
  - DNA fingerprinting – genetic fingerprint – microsatellite – gene knockout – imprinting – RNA interference Genomics – computational biology – bioinformatics – gel electrophoresis – transformation – PCR – PCR mutagenesis – primer – chromosome walking – RFLP – restriction enzyme – sequencing – shotgun sequencing – cloning – culture – DNA microarray – electrophoresis – protein tag – affinity chromatography – x-ray diffraction – proteomics – mass spectrometry – CRISPR – gene therapy
- Genes, development, and evolution
  - Apoptosis
  - French flag model
  - Pattern formation
  - Evo-devo gene toolkit
  - Transcription factor

== Evolution ==
Outline of evolution (see also evolutionary biology)

- Evolutionary processes
  - evolution
  - microevolution: adaptation – selection – natural selection – directional selection – sexual selection – genetic drift – sexual reproduction – asexual reproduction – colony – allele frequency – neutral theory of molecular evolution – population genetics – Hardy–Weinberg principle
- Speciation
  - Species
- Phylogeny
  - Lineage (evolution) – evolutionary tree – cladistics – species – taxon – clade – monophyletic – polyphyly – paraphyly – heredity – phenotypic trait – nucleic acid sequence – synapomorphy – homology – molecular clock – outgroup (cladistics) – maximum parsimony (phylogenetics) – Computational phylogenetics
  - Linnaean taxonomy: Carl Linnaeus – domain (biology) – kingdom (biology) – phylum – class (biology) – order (biology) – family (biology) – genus – species
  - Three-domain system: archaea – bacteria – eukaryote – protist – fungi – plant – animal
  - Binomial nomenclature: scientific classification – Homo sapiens
- History of life
  - Origin of life – hierarchy of life – Miller–Urey experiment
  - Macroevolution: adaptive radiation – convergent evolution – extinction – mass extinction – fossil – taphonomy – geologic time – plate tectonics – continental drift – vicariance – Gondwana – Pangaea – endosymbiosis

== Life ==
- Bacteria and Archaea
- Protists
- Plant diversity
  - Green algae
    - Chlorophyta
    - Charophyta
  - Bryophytes
    - Marchantiophyta
    - Anthocerotophyta
    - Moss
  - Pteridophytes
    - Lycopodiophyta
    - Polypodiophyta
  - Seed plants
    - Cycadophyta
    - Ginkgophyta
    - Pinophyta
    - Gnetophyta
    - Magnoliophyta
- Fungi
  - Yeast – mold (fungus) – mushroom
- Animal diversity
  - Invertebrates:
    - sponge – cnidarian – coral – jellyfish – Hydra (genus) – sea anemone
    - flatworms – nematodes
    - arthropods: crustacean – chelicerata – myriapoda – arachnids – insects – annelids – molluscs
  - Vertebrates:
    - fishes: – agnatha – chondrichthyes – osteichthyes
    - Tiktaalik
    - tetrapods
      - amphibians
      - reptiles
      - birds
        - flightless birds – Neognathae – dinosaurs
      - mammals
        - placental: primates
        - marsupial
        - monotreme
- Viruses
  - DNA viruses – RNA viruses – retroviruses

== Plant form and function ==
- Plant body
  - Organ systems: root – shoot – stem – leaf – flower
- Plant nutrition and transport
  - Vascular tissue – bark (botany) – Casparian strip – turgor pressure – xylem – phloem – transpiration – wood – trunk (botany)
- Plant development
  - tropism – taxis
  - seed – cotyledon – meristem – apical meristem – vascular cambium – cork cambium
  - alternation of generations – gametophyte – antheridium – archegonium – sporophyte – spore – sporangium
- Plant reproduction
  - angiosperms – flower – reproduction – sperm – pollination – self-pollination – cross-pollination – nectar – pollen
- Plant responses
  - Plant hormone – ripening – fruit – Ethylene as a plant hormone – toxin – pollinator – phototropism – skototropism – phototropin – phytochrome – auxin – photoperiodism – gravity

== Animal form and function ==
- General features: morphology (biology) – anatomy – physiology – biological tissues – organ (biology) – organ systems
- Water and salt balance
  - Body fluids: osmotic pressure – ionic composition – volume
    - Diffusion – osmosis) – Tonicity – sodium – potassium – calcium – chloride
  - Excretion
- Nutrition and digestion
  - Digestive system: stomach – intestine – liver – nutrition – primary nutritional groups metabolism – kidney – excretion
- Breathing
  - Respiratory system: lungs
- Circulation
  - Circulatory system: heart – artery – vein – capillary – Blood – blood cell
  - Lymphatic system: lymph node
- Muscle and movement
  - Skeletal system: bone – cartilage – joint – tendon
  - Muscular system: muscle – actin – myosin – reflex
- Nervous system
  - Neuron – dendrite – axon – nerve – electrochemical gradient – electrophysiology – action potential – signal transduction – synapse – receptor –
  - Central nervous system: brain – spinal cord
    - limbic system – memory – vestibular system
  - Peripheral nervous system
  - Sensory nervous system: eye – vision – audition – proprioception – olfaction –
- Integumentary system: skin cell
- Hormonal control
  - Endocrine system: hormone

- Animal reproduction
  - Reproductive system: testes – ovary – pregnancy
    - Fish#Reproductive system
    - Mammalian reproductive system
      - Human reproductive system
      - Mammalian penis
        - Os penis
        - Penile spines
      - Genitalia of bottlenose dolphins
      - Genitalia of marsupials
      - Equine reproductive system
      - Even-toed ungulate#Genitourinary system
      - Bull#Reproductive anatomy
      - Carnivora#Reproductive system
        - Fossa (animal)#External genitalia
        - Female genitalia of spotted hyenas
        - Cat anatomy#Genitalia
        - Genitalia of dogs
          - Canine penis
            - Bulbus glandis
- Animal development
  - stem cell – blastula – gastrula – egg (biology) – fetus – placenta - gamete – spermatid – ovum – zygote – embryo – cellular differentiation – morphogenesis – homeobox
- Immune system
  - antibody – host – vaccine – immune cell – AIDS – T cell – leucocyte
- Animal behavior
  - Behavior: mating – animal communication – seek shelter – migration (ecology)
  - Fixed action pattern
  - Altruism (biology)

== Ecology ==
Outline of ecology

- Ecosystems:
  - Ecology – Biodiversity – habitat – plankton – thermocline – saprobe
  - Abiotic component: water – light – radiation – temperature – humidity – atmosphere – acidity
  - Microbe – biomass – organic matter – decomposer – decomposition – carbon – nutrient cycling – solar energy – topography – tilt – Windward and leeward – precipitation Temperature – biome
- Populations
  - Population ecology: organism – geographical area – sexual reproduction – population density – population growth – birth rate – death Rate – immigration rate – exponential growth – carrying capacity – logistic function – natural environment – competition (biology) – mating – biological dispersal – endemic (ecology) – growth curve (biology) – habitat – drinking water – resource – human population – technology – Green revolution
- Communities
  - Community (ecology) – ecological niche – keystone species – mimicry – symbiosis – pollination – mutualism – commensalism – parasitism – predation – invasive species – environmental heterogeneity – edge effect
  - Consumer–resource interactions: food chain – food web – autotroph – heterotrophs – herbivore – carnivore – trophic level
- Biosphere
  - lithosphere – atmosphere – hydrosphere
  - biogeochemical cycle: nitrogen cycle – carbon cycle – water cycle
  - Climate change: Fossil fuel – coal – oil – natural gas – World energy consumption – Climate change feedback – Albedo – water vapor Carbon sink
- Conservation
  - Biodiversity – habitats – Ecosystem services – biodiversity loss – extinction – Sustainability – Holocene extinction – bioremediation

== Branches ==
- Anatomy – study of form in animals, plants and other organisms, or specifically in humans. Simply, the study of internal structure of living organisms.
  - Physiology – study of the internal workings of organisms and the functions of anatomical structures.
  - Comparative anatomy – the study of evolution of species through similarities and differences in their anatomy.
  - Gross anatomy – study of anatomy at the macroscopic level
  - Histology – also known as microscopic anatomy or microanatomy, the branch of biology which studies the microscopic anatomy of biological tissues.
  - Neuroanatomy – the study of the nervous system.
  - Osteology – study of bones.
  - Radiographic anatomy – study of anatomy through radiography
  - Surface anatomy – study of external features of a body
- Biochemistry – study of the chemical reactions required for life to exist and function, usually a focus on the cellular level.
- Biophysics – study of biological processes through the methods traditionally used in the physical sciences.
  - Biomechanics – the study of the mechanics of living beings.
  - Cellular biophysics – study of physical principles underlying cell function
  - Neurophysics – study of the development of the nervous system on a molecular level.
  - Molecular biophysics – study of physical properties of biomolecules at the molecular level
  - Quantum biology – application of quantum mechanics and theoretical chemistry to biological objects and problems.
  - Virophysics – study of mechanics and dynamics driving the interactions between virus and cells.
- Biotechnology – new and sometimes controversial branch of biology that studies the manipulation of living matter, including genetic modification and synthetic biology.
  - Bioinformatics – use of information technology for the study, collection, and storage of genomic and other biological data.
  - Bioengineering – study of biology through the means of engineering with an emphasis on applied knowledge and especially related to biotechnology.
  - Synthetic biology – research integrating biology and engineering; construction of biological functions not found in nature.
- Botany – study of plants.
  - Economic botany – study of relationship between people and plants, including the practical uses of plants
  - Ethnobotany – study of a region's plants and their usage by people
  - Photobiology – scientific study of the interactions of light (technically, non-ionizing radiation) and living organisms. The field includes the study of photosynthesis, photomorphogenesis, visual processing, circadian rhythms, bioluminescence, and ultraviolet radiation effects.
  - Phycology – scientific study of algae.
  - Plant anatomy – study of internal structure of plants
  - Plant ecology – study of how plants interact with each other and their environment
  - Plant genetics – study of heredity and variation in plants
  - Plant pathology – study of plant diseases
  - Plant physiology – subdiscipline of botany concerned with the functioning, or physiology, of plants.
- Cell biology – study of the cell as a complete unit, and the molecular and chemical interactions that occur within a living cell.
  - Histology – study of the anatomy of cells and tissues of plants and animals using microscopy.
- Chronobiology – field of biology that examines periodic (cyclic) phenomena in living organisms and their adaptation to solar- and lunar-related rhythms.
  - Dendrochronology – study of tree rings, using them to date the exact year they were formed in order to analyze atmospheric conditions during different periods in natural history.
- Developmental biology – study of the processes through which an organism forms, from zygote to full structure
  - Embryology – study of the development of embryo (from fecundation to birth).
  - Gerontology – study of aging processes.
- Ecology – study of the interactions of living organisms with one another and with the non-living elements of their environment.
  - Behavioral ecology – the study of the evolutionary basis for animal behavior due to ecological pressure
  - Ecosystem ecology – study of biotic and abiotic components of ecosystems and their interactions within an ecosystem
  - Landscape ecology – study of relationships between ecological processes in the environment and particular ecosystems
  - Microbial ecology – study of the relationships between microorganisms and their environments
  - Population ecology – study of dynamics of species populations and how these populations interact with the environment
  - Urban ecology – study of the relationships between living organisms with each other and their urban environment.
  - Biogeography – study of the distribution of species spatially and temporally.
- Evolutionary biology – study of the origin and descent of species over time.
  - Evolutionary developmental biology – field of biology that compares the developmental processes of different organisms to determine the ancestral relationship between them, and to discover how developmental processes evolved.
  - Paleobiology – discipline which combines the methods and findings of the life sciences with the methods and findings of the earth science, paleontology.
    - Paleoanthropology – the study of fossil evidence for human evolution, mainly using remains from extinct hominin and other primate species to determine the morphological and behavioral changes in the human lineage, as well as the environment in which human evolution occurred.
    - Paleobotany – study of fossil plants.
    - Paleontology – study of fossils and sometimes geographic evidence of prehistoric life.
    - Paleopathology – the study of pathogenic conditions observable in bones or mummified soft tissue, and on nutritional disorders, variation in stature or morphology of bones over time, evidence of physical trauma, or evidence of occupationally derived biomechanic stress.
- Genetics – study of genes and heredity.
  - Molecular genetics – study of the bimolecular mechanisms behind the structure and function of DNA
  - Quantitative genetics – study of phenotypes that vary continuously (in characters such as height or mass)—as opposed to discretely identifiable phenotypes and gene-products (such as eye-colour, or the presence of a particular biochemical).
- Marine biology – study of ocean ecosystems, plants, animals, and other living beings.
- Microbiology – study of microscopic organisms (microorganisms) and their interactions with other living things.
  - Bacteriology – study of bacteria
  - Immunology – study of immune systems in all organisms.
  - Mycology – study of fungi
  - Parasitology – study of parasites and parasitism.
  - Virology – study of viruses
- Biochemistry
  - Molecular biology – study of biology and biological functions at the molecular level, with some cross over from biochemistry.
  - Structural biology – a branch of molecular biology, biochemistry, and biophysics concerned with the molecular structure of biological macromolecules.
- Health sciences and human biology – biology of humans.
  - Medicine – Diagnosis, treatment, and prevention of illness.
    - Endocrinology – study of the endocrine system.
    - Oncology – study of cancer processes, including virus or mutation, oncogenesis, angiogenesis, and tissues remoldings.
    - Pharmacology – study of medication and drugs
    - Epidemiology – major component of public health research, studying factors affecting the health of populations.
- Neuroscience – study of the nervous system, including anatomy, physiology and emergent proprieties.
  - Behavioral neuroscience – study of physiological, genetic, and developmental mechanisms of behavior in humans and other animals.
  - Cellular neuroscience – study of neurons at a cellular level.
  - Cognitive neuroscience – study of biological substrates underlying cognition, with a focus on the neural substrates of mental processes.
  - Computational neuroscience – study of the information processing functions of the nervous system, and the use of digital computers to study the nervous system.
  - Developmental neuroscience – study of the cellular basis of brain development and addresses the underlying mechanisms.
  - Molecular neuroscience – studies the biology of the nervous system with molecular biology, molecular genetics, protein chemistry and related methodologies.
  - Neuroanatomy – study of the anatomy of nervous tissue and neural structures of the nervous system.
  - Neuroendocrinology – studies the interaction between the nervous system and the endocrine system, that is how the brain regulates the hormonal activity in the body.
  - Neuroethology – study of animal behavior and its underlying mechanistic control by the nervous system.
  - Neuroimmunology – study of the nervous system, and immunology, the study of the immune system.
  - Neuropharmacology – study of how drugs affect cellular function in the nervous system.
  - Neurophysiology – study of the function (as opposed to structure) of the nervous system.
  - Systems neuroscience – studies the function of neural circuits and systems.
- Theoretical biology – the mathematical modeling of biological phenomena.
  - Systems biology – computational modeling of biological systems.
- Zoology – study of animals, including classification, physiology, development, and behavior. Subbranches include:
  - Arthropodology – biological discipline concerned with the study of arthropods, a phylum of animals that include the insects, arachnids, crustaceans and others that are characterized by the possession of jointed limbs.
    - Acarology – study of the taxon of arachnids that contains mites and ticks.
    - Arachnology – scientific study of spiders and related animals such as scorpions, pseudoscorpions, harvestmen, collectively called arachnids.
    - Entomology – study of insects.
      - Coleopterology – study of beetles.
      - Lepidopterology – study of a large order of insects that includes moths and butterflies (called lepidopterans).
      - Myrmecology – scientific study of ants.
    - Carcinology – study of crustaceans.
    - Myriapodology – study of centipedes, millipedes, and other myriapods.
  - Ethology – scientific study of animal behavior, usually with a focus on behavior under natural conditions.
  - Helminthology – study of worms, especially parasitic worms.
  - Herpetology – study of amphibians (including frogs, toads, salamanders, newts, and gymnophiona) and reptiles (including snakes, lizards, amphisbaenids, turtles, terrapins, tortoises, crocodilians, and the tuataras).
    - Batrachology – subdiscipline of herpetology concerned with the study of amphibians alone.
  - Ichthyology – study of fishes. This includes bony fishes (Osteichthyes), cartilaginous fishes (Chondrichthyes), and jawless fishes (Agnatha).
  - Malacology – branch of invertebrate zoology which deals with the study of the Mollusca (mollusks or molluscs), the second-largest phylum of animals in terms of described species after the arthropods.
    - Teuthology – branch of Malacology which deals with the study of cephalopods.
  - Mammalogy – study of mammals, a class of vertebrates with characteristics such as homeothermic metabolism, fur, four-chambered hearts, and complex nervous systems. Mammalogy has also been known as "mastology," "theriology," and "therology." There are about 4,200 different species of animals which are considered mammals.
    - Cetology – branch of marine mammal science that studies the approximately eighty species of whales, dolphins, and porpoise in the scientific order Cetacea.
    - Primatology – scientific study of primates
    - Human biology – interdisciplinary field studying the range of humans and human populations via biology/life sciences, anthropology/social sciences, applied/medical sciences
    - Biological anthropology – subfield of anthropology that studies the physical morphology, genetics and behavior of the human genus, other hominins and hominids across their evolutionary development
      - Human behavioral ecology – the study of behavioral adaptations (foraging, reproduction, ontogeny) from the evolutionary and ecologic perspectives (see behavioral ecology). It focuses on human adaptive responses (physiological, developmental, genetic) to environmental stresses.
  - Nematology – scientific discipline concerned with the study of nematodes, or roundworms.
  - Ornithology – scientific study of birds.
- Interdisciplinary fields
  - Astrobiology – study of potential life outside of Earth.
  - Bioarchaeology – study of human and animal remains from archaeological sites.
  - Comparative biology – study of patterns and natural variation in species through similarities and differences at all levels, from genes to communities.
  - Geobiology – study of the interactions between the physical Earth and the biosphere.
  - Biolinguistics – biological study of language.
  - Biological anthropology – study of the development of the human species.

== Biologists ==
Lists of notable biologists

- List of notable biologists
- List of Nobel Prize winners in physiology or medicine
- Lists of biologists by author abbreviation
  - List of authors of names published under the ICZN

Lists of biologists by subject

- List of biochemists
- List of ecologists
- List of neuroscientists
- List of physiologists

== See also ==
- Bibliography of biology
- Earliest known life forms
- Invasion biology terminology
- List of omics topics in biology

Related outlines

- Outline of life forms
- Outline of zoology
- Outline of engineering
- Outline of technology
- List of social sciences

Journals

- Biology journals
