= Lists of biologists =

Lists of biologists by author abbreviation include lists of botanists and of zoologists. The abbreviations are typically used in articles on species described or named by the biologist.

== Botanists ==
Contents:	A	B	C	D	E F	G	H	I J	K L	M	N O	P	Q R	S	T U V	W X Y Z

== Zoologists ==
- List of authors of names published under the ICZN
