= List of Chinese films of 1994 =

A list of mainland Chinese films released in 1994:

Title	Director	Cast	Genre	Notes
The Accused Uncle Shangang	Fan Yuan	Rentang Li		1995 Golden Rooster for best film, best actor, and best directorial debut
Back to Back, Face to Face	Huang Jianxin			
Black Mountain	Zhou Xiaowen	Ailiya	Romance/War	
Born Coward	Yan Xiaozhui	Ge You	Crime	
Country Teachers	He Qun	Li Baotian, Wang Xueqi	Drama	1994 Golden Rooster for Best Picture
Cradle on Wheels	Mi Jiashan	Wang Xueqi	Drama	
Dirt	Guan Hu	Kong Lin	Drama	
Drowning	Hu Xueyang	Hu Xueyang	Drama	Also known as Neglected Youth
Ermo	Zhou Xiaowen	Ailiya	Drama/Comedy	
Family Scandal	Liu Miaomiao, Cui Xiaoqin	Li Wannian, Wang Zhiwen	Drama	
Fools in Love	Chen Guoxing		Comedy	
Gone Forever with My Love	Feng Xiaogang	Guo Tao, Xu Fan	Drama	
In the Heat of the Sun	Jiang Wen	Xia Yu, Ning Jing	Drama	
Narrow Escape	Zhang Jianya		Drama	
Red Firecracker, Green Firecracker	He Ping	Ning Jing	Drama	
A Soul Haunted by Painting	Huang Shuqin	Gong Li	Biographical	
Sparkling Fox	Wu Ziniu			
The Square	Zhang Yuan		Documentary	
Story of Yunnan	Zhang Nuanxing			
To Live	Zhang Yimou	Gong Li, Ge You	Drama	Won three awards at Cannes
The Wooden Man's Bride	Huang Jianxin	Wang Lan, Chang Shih	Romantic drama	First Mainland film to be financed entirely by Taiwanese backers

== See also ==
- 1994 in China
