= Purple Sunset =

2001 film by Feng Xiaoning

- Film poster
- Traditional Chinese: 紫日
- Simplified Chinese: 紫日
- Hanyu Pinyin: Zǐrì
- Directed by: Feng Xiaoning
- Written by: Feng Xiaoning
- Produced by: Feng Xiaoning
- Starring: Fu Dalong; Chie Maeda; Anna Dzenilalova
- Cinematography: Feng Xiaoning
- Edited by: Yan Jianbin
- Music by: Li Ge
- Production companies: Beijing Forbidden City Film; Shanghai Paradise Film and Television Group
- Release date: 2001
- Running time: 106 minutes
- Country: China
- Languages: Mandarin; Russian; Japanese

Purple Sunset (Chinese: 紫日; pinyin: Zǐrì) is a 2001 Chinese war drama film written and directed by Feng Xiaoning. Feng also acted as the film's cinematographer.

Purple Sunset is an anti-war film set in August 1945, at the time during the Soviet invasion of Manchuria and when the Japanese were in the throes of defeat during World War II and losing control of mainland China. The film won Best Special Effects at the Huabiao Awards and Best Cinematography at the Golden Rooster Award. It was also voted Best Feature by the audience during the 2001 Hawaii International Film Festival. Feng considered it the last of his "War and Peace" (战争与和平) trilogy, preceded by Red River Valley (1997), and Lover's Grief over the Yellow River (1999).

== Plot ==
In 2000, an elderly Chinese man named Yang is being interviewed by a journalist and begins reminiscing about the Second Sino-Japanese War. He grasps an old okiagari-koboshi musical doll, which brings his memories back to August 1945, near the end of the war.

In the Greater Khingan mountains in 1945, Yang, then a Hebei peasant in his 30s, is captured by Japanese imperial soldiers and brought to the Daxing'anling area near Manchuria (bordering the Soviet Union) after the Japanese slaughter his aged mother. He is put in a firing squad to be executed. The firing kills everyone in line except for Yang. As a Japanese soldier reloads the machine gun, a Soviet T-34-85 tank knocks over the wall against which the captives were lined. The tank crushes the Japanese soldier and saves Yang's life. Yang is the sole survivor and is put under the charge of Nadja, a young female Soviet lieutenant, and her comrades. Nadja is tasked with escorting Yang to headquarters, but their truck driver Shakov takes a wrong turn and strays into a Japanese garrison. Most of the Soviet soldiers on the truck are killed in the ensuing skirmish, but Nadja, Shakov and Yang escape into a forested area.

As the three cross a bridge, they come under a grenade attack from a teenage Japanese schoolgirl named Akiyoko and her older sister hiding in a wooden shed. After being confronted by Shakov, Akiyoko's sister commits suicide by swallowing a cyanide capsule. Akiyoko attempts to commit suicide the same way but is stopped by Shakov. Fearing that releasing her will alert the Japanese troops, the three take Akiyoko captive and force her to lead them out of the vast forest. Akiyoko brings the three to a minefield where a land mine blows up Shakov. Nadja is infuriated by her comrade's death, but decides not to kill Akiyoko as she is their sole guide out of the forest. Nadja carries very little food; both Yang and Akiyoko follow her for this reason. Without Nadja, they will not make it out of the forest alive.

The two feel betrayed by Akiyoko's cunning, and forcefully tie her to a tree. Nadja hands Yang a dagger to kill Akiyoko, Yang falters at the last second and hesitates due to a flashback. Yang remembers the Japanese tying his elderly mother and himself to wooden posts when they invaded his village, using bayonets to stab his mother to death in front of his very eyes. Faltering, Yang drops the blade and convulses into tears. After that, Yang decides to continue with Nadja, leaving Akiyoko stranded in the forest to die alone. However, in a stroke of mercy, he returns and frees Akiyoko, taking her along with them.

At many points, both Yang and Nadja are tempted to kill Akiyoko, but eventually save her from drowning in a quagmire. That night, Yang encounters another flashback: being forced by the Japanese to dump dead Chinese civilians into the river. One victim signaled to Yang that he was still alive. Yang conveyed this information to the Japanese captors, and they forcefully placed the victim into a gunny sack and burnt him alive. They then tied a bundle of live grenades sadistically to the sack and dumped him into the river. A traumatized Yang looked on with anguish.

On the third day, the three make it out of the forest alive. To the north lies flat, open grassland that stretches on forever. When crossing the plains, they witness a dogfight between a Japanese Mitsubishi Zero and another plane. The Japanese fighter jet emits a trail of black smoke and crashes into the field behind. Akiyoko is reminded of her childhood sweetheart Onishi, who was conscripted as a fighter pilot by the Japanese air force. In sudden desperation, she runs towards the downed plane. Worried, Yang follows her. The wreckage is soon engulfed in flames, and the fire spreads to the surrounding grass, raging towards them. When she realizes that they cannot outrun the flames, Akiyoko saves Yang and Nadja's lives by telling them to stay low on a burnt patch of grass.

After the fire dies down, Yang realizes that Akiyoko can speak Chinese. He frees her by cutting the cord binding her hands. Yang and Nadja learn about Akiyoko's background: she moved to China with her family as settlers in Manchuria when she was four years old, and grew up in Greater Khingan. Her father was a lumber farm owner. When the Japanese conscripted her father to the front line, he instructed her to flee with her sister to the seaside where they would cross the sea to the Japanese mainland. However, they soon lost contact, and Akiyoko and her sister ended up in the hideout where they first encountered Shakov.

Although Nadja wants to move north to meet up with the Soviet troops, Akiyoko convinces Yang to move south, claiming it is the only way out of the forest. All three experience conflicting feelings of mistrust and friendship as they rely on one another to survive. At one point, a sudden rainstorm causes Nadja to stray from her two partners when she is out searching for food. Yang and Akiyoko wait for two days for Nadja's return, but Nadja is able to find her way back after Yang fires her PPSh-41 submachine gun at an attacking tiger. Akiyoko discovers that Yang does not know how to fire a gun, but he refuses to let her touch it. Yang develops a curiosity for Nadja's gun, and slowly learns by himself how to use it.

The three eventually find their way to the same location where they confront the Japanese troops. Yang and Nadja realize that they have been tricked by Akiyoko. A tearful Akiyoko explains she is trying to get them to surrender to the Japanese troops so that they can get food and lodging at the now abandoned camp. The three end up at the same Soviet truck which they had earlier left during the skirmish with the Japanese troops, where the truck radio began to announce Emperor Hirohito' unconditional surrender to the Allied troops. Akiyoko, shocked and humiliated by Japan's loss, grabs Nadja's PPSh-41 and aims at Yang and Nadja. Yang advances towards Akiyoko, placing the muzzle of the gun against his chest. Akiyoko is unable to fire the gun, and convulses into sobs. Nadja then discovers that Yang has removed the cartridges from the gun before Akiyoko picks it up.

With the war now ended, Yang urges Akiyoko to go back to Japan and live a good life. Akiyoko tells Yang that she wishes to return to Japan in search of Onishi. Unfortunately, unbeknownst to Akiyoko, Onishi is part of the final fleet of Kamikaze fighter pilots sent to their deaths on August 16, 1945, one day after the Japanese surrender. Onishi is instructed to crash his fighter plane into an American warship. While in flight, Onishi attempts to escape from the cockpit, only to find it locked. Resigned to his fate, Onishi crashes his plane into the sea, which subsequently explodes.

Hearing a series of loud explosions, the three then witness a group of Japanese soldiers and civilians committing mass suicide as they could not accept the fact that their country surrendered. Akiyoko mistakenly thinks they are not informed of the surrender and runs to stop their foolish acts. She is shot in the head by a Japanese captain. Akiyoko's okiagari-koboshi doll rolls out of her grasp, and she dies.

Consumed by fury and vengeance, Yang and Nadja drive the truck and attack the remaining Japanese soldiers, who are charging at them. After killing the Japanese soldiers, Yang picks up Akiyoko's okiagari-koboshi doll. In the present day, an elderly Nadja places flowers on Poklonnaya Gora war memorial with the large numerals "1945" to commemorate Akiyoko's death. Another flashback to 1945, where a voice from the truck's radio reads out a declaration of peace and harmony, as the remaining Japanese troops toss their weapons aside in the sunset. Nadja points out to Yang that the sunset is purple, a sight that Akiyoko cherished. A statistic of World War II casualties rolls up at the credits.

== Cast ==
- Fu Dalong as Yang, a peasant Chinese farmer who was initially to be executed by the Japanese firing squad. In a stroke of luck, he was saved by the Red Army liberating his village the moment he was about to be executed. After being found by the Soviets, he's handed over to Nadja.
- Chie Maeda as Akiyoko, a young Japanese schoolgirl who Yang and Nadja encounter when they cross a bridge into Japanese territory.
- Anna Dzenilalova as Nadja, a Soviet Russian lieutenant who is ordered to take care of Yang when he is found alive. It was revealed in a flashback that she volunteered into the Soviet army after her son were killed by a downed German aircraft.
- Wang Xuewei as Onishi, Akiyoko's love interest and a kamikaze pilot.

== See also ==
- Soviet-Japanese War
- Soviet invasion of Manchuria
- End of World War II in Asia
- Japanese repatriation from Huludao
