= 5th Beijing College Student Film Festival =

1998 film festival in Beijing, China

The 5th Beijing College Student Film Festival (simplified Chinese: 第五届北京大学生电影节; traditional Chinese: 第五屆北京大學生電影節) was held in 1998 in Beijing, China.

== Awards ==
- Best Film Award: Genghis Khan
- Best Director Award: Zhang Yang for Spicy Love Soup
- Best Actor Award: Wang Xueqi for Red Suit
- Best Actress Award: Ai Liya for Genghis Khan
- Best Visual Effects Award: Spicy Love Soup
- Artistic Exploration Award: Sun Bird
- Committee Special Award: Red River Valley, The Great Military March Forward: Pursue and wipe Out in the South
- Special Jury Award: Bearing Father to School, Superconductor
- Best Documentary Award: Foreign Affairs: Zhou Enlai
- Favorite Film: Foreign Affairs: Zhou Enlai
- Favorite Actor Award: Ge You for The Dream Factory
- Favorite Actress Award: Ning Jing for Red River Valley
