= Huabiao Awards =

Annual Chinese film awards ceremony

China Huabiao Film Awards 中国电影华表奖
- The Huabiao Award
- Awarded for: Outstanding in film
- Country: China
- Presented by: Ministry of Culture of the People's Republic of China
- First award: 1957

China Huabiao Film Awards
- Simplified Chinese: 中国电影华表奖
Transcriptions
Standard Mandarin
- Hanyu Pinyin: Zhōngguó Diànyǐng Huábiǎo Jiǎng
Yue: Cantonese
- Yale Romanization: Jūnggwok Dihnyíng Wabíu Jéung
- Jyutping: Zung^{1}gwok^{3} Din^{6}jing^{2} Wa^{4}biu^{2} Zoeng^{2}

China Huabiao Film Awards (Chinese: 中国电影华表奖; pinyin: Zhōngguó Diànyǐng Huábiǎo Jiǎng; also simply known as Huabiao Awards) is the highest honor bestowed by the Chinese government for artistic and technical merit in film. It is held once every two years in Beijing.

Named after the decorative Chinese winged columns (huabiaos), The Huabiao Awards were first instituted in 1957 as the Ministry of Culture Excellence Film awards. Between 1958 and 1979, no awards were given. In 1994, the awards were renamed "Huabiao." Along with the Golden Rooster Awards and Hundred Flowers Awards, these are known as China's three main film awards.

Unlike other award ceremonies, Huabiao Awards for individual categories are often given to multiple nominees.

== Ceremonies ==
| Ceremony | Film year(s) | Outstanding Director | Outstanding Leading Actor | Outstanding Leading Actress |
|---|---|---|---|---|
| 1st | 1994 | Zhang Jianya | Li Rentang | Ai Liya |
| 2nd | 1995 | Chen Guoxing; Wang Ping | Gao Ming | Cao Cuifen |
| 3rd | 1996 | Wei Lian; Feng Xiaoning | Fu Xuecheng; Liu Peiqi | Yu Hui |
| 4th | 1997 | Hu Bingliu; Yang Guangyuan | Tang Guoqiang | Tao Hong; Pan Yu |
| 5th | 1998 | Sun Sha; Zhang Yimou; Teng Wenji | Shao Bing; Zhao Benshan | Xu Fan; Mei Ting |
| 6th | 1999 | Chen Guojun; Wu Ziniu; Zhang Jianya | Chen Daoming; Li Xuejian | Jiang Wenli; Chen Jin |
| 7th | 2000 | Yu Benzheng; Chen Li; Huo Jianqi | Wang Xueqi; Wang Qingxiang | Xi Meijuan; Xia Lan |
| 8th | 2001 | Song Yeming; Sai Fu; Mai Lisi | Hou Yong; Wang Ji | Tao Hong; Yu Hui |
| 9th | 2002 | Di Junjie; Yang Yazhou | Liu Peiqi; Lu Qi | Ni Ping; Huang Suying |
| 10th | 2003 | Zheng Dongtian; Huo Jianqi | Liu Wei; Zhou Xiaobin | Ju Xue; Jiang Wenli |
| 11th | 2004 | Yin Li; Lu Chuan | Wu Jun; Pu Cunxin | Zhao Wei; Zhang Ziyi |
| 12th | Early-2007 (2005, 2006) | Yin Li; Gao Qunshu | Chen Kun; Fu Dalong | Li Bingbing; Ding Jiali |
| 13th | Early-2009 (Mid-2007, 2008) | Feng Xiaogang; Chen Kaige | Zhang Hanyu; Guo Jinglin | Zhang Ziyi; Fan Zhibo |
| 14th | Early-2011 (Mid-2009, 2010) | Wang Jia; Shen Dong; Han Sanping; Huang Jianxin | Li Xuejian; Ge You | Xu Fan; Naren Hua |
| 15th | Early-2013 (Mid-2011, 2012) | Feng Xiaogang; Chen Li | Huang Xiaoming; Liu Zhibing | Zhang Ziyi; Yan Bingyan |
| 16th | Early-2016 (2014, 2015) | Tsui Hark | Andy Lau | Bai Baihe |
| 17th | Early-2018 (2016, 2017) | Dante Lam | Wu Jing | Chen Jin |
| 18th | Early-2020 (2018, 2019) | Chen Kaige; Zhang Yibai; Guan Hu; Xue Xiaolu; Xu Zheng; Ning Hao; Wen Muye | Zhang Yi | Ren Suxi |
| 19th | Early-2022 (2020, 2021) | Chen Kaige; Tsui Hark; Dante Lam | Liu Ye | Zhang Zifeng |
| 20th | Early-2025 (2022, 2024) | Frant Gwo | Zhang Yi | Kara Wai |

== Categories ==
- Outstanding Film
- Outstanding Producer
- Outstanding Director
- Outstanding Writer
- Outstanding Actor
- Outstanding Actress
- Outstanding Composer
- Outstanding New Actor
- Outstanding New Actress
- Outstanding Animation
- Outstanding Documentary

== See also ==
- Golden Rooster Awards
- Hundred Flowers Awards
- Shanghai Film Critics Awards
