= 17th Huabiao Awards =

Annual Chinese film awards ceremony

The 17th Huabiao Awards (simplified Chinese: 第十七届华表奖; traditional Chinese: 第十七屆華表獎) were held on 8 December 2018 at the Beijing National Aquatics Center in Beijing, China, and broadcast by CCTV Movie Channel.

Hold Your Hands was the biggest winner, receiving three awards, including Outstanding Film, Outstanding Actress and Outstanding Writer. Wu Jing won the Outstanding Actor award and Chen Jin won the Outstanding Actress award.

== Winners and nominees ==
Outstanding Film	Outstanding Director
Hold Your Hands; Xuanzang; The War of Loong; Old Aunt; Operation Red Sea; Our Time Will Come; The Founding of an Army; Wolf Warrior 2; Operation Mekong; Big Fish & Begonia	Dante Lam–Operation Mekong
Outstanding Rural Theme Film	Outstanding Minority Theme Film
The Missing Sheep	Drums in Taklimakan
Outstanding Children's Film	Outstanding Youth film
Whirlwind Girls' Team	How Long Will I Love U
Outstanding Writer	Outstanding Director
Miao Yue–Hold Your Hands	Dante Lam–Operation Mekong
Outstanding Actor	Outstanding Actress
Wu Jing–Wolf Warrior 2	Chen Jin–Hold Your Hands
Outstanding Cinematography	Outstanding Music
Cao Yu–Legend of the Demon Cat	Wang Xiaofeng–Xuanzang
