= 15th Golden Rooster Awards =

1995 Chinese film awards ceremony

The 15th Golden Rooster Awards, honoring the best in film, were given on 1995, Beijing.

== Winners and nominees ==
=== Best Film ===
The Accused Uncle Shangang/被告山杠爷

- Police Soul/警魂
- 吴二哥请神
- Narrow Escape/绝境逢生

=== Best Director ===
Huang Jianxin/Yang Yazhou - Back to Back, Face to Face

- Zhou Xiaowen - Ermo

=== Best Directorial Debut ===
Fan Yuan - The Accused Uncle Shangang
Ning Haiqiang - Traceless Ballistic Trajectory

=== Best Writing ===
Bi Bicheng/Fan Yuan - The Accused Uncle Shangang

- Huang Xin/Sun Yian - Back to Back, Face to Face

=== Best Actor ===
Li Rentang - The Accused Uncle Shangang

- Niu Zhenhua - Back to Back, Face to Face

=== Best Actress ===
Ai Liya - Ermo

- Xu Fan - Farewell My Love
- Pu Chaoying - 女人花

=== Best Supporting Actor ===
not awarded this year

- Ju Hao - Back to Back, Face to Face

=== Best Supporting Actress ===
Ju Xue - Farewell My Love

=== Best Art Direction ===
Yang Gang - Conquer

- Tan Xiaolin - The Accused Uncle Shangang
- Quan Rongzhe - Narrow Escape

=== Best Cinematography ===
Bao Xiaoran - South China 1944

- Lv Gengxin - Ermo
- Zhang Xigui - Girl on the Spot

=== Best Editing ===
Sun Huiming - Narrow Escape
Nie Weiguo - 大漠歼匪

=== Best Music ===
Chang Yuhong - Conquer

- Cheng Dazhao - 广州来的新疆娃

=== Best Sound Recording ===
not awarded this year

- Yan Jun - Back to Back, Face to Face
- Hong Yi - Ermo

=== Best Animation ===
White Egg/白色的蛋

- 黄人黄土
- 胡僧

=== Best Documentary ===
Old Song of Past Times/往事歌谣

- 通一兵－见义勇为的英雄战士徐洪刚
