= The Grand Mansion Gate =

2001 Chinese historical television series

- Traditional Chinese: 大宅門
- Simplified Chinese: 大宅门
- Hanyu Pinyin: Dàzhaímén
- Genre: Historical
- Based on: The Grand Mansion Gate by Guo Baochang
- Written by: Guo Baochang
- Directed by: Guo Baochang
- Starring: Siqin Gaowa; Chen Baoguo; Liu Peiqi; Du Yulu; He Saifei; Jiang Wenli; Zhang Fengyi
- Opening theme: The Grand Mansion Gate by Hu Xiaoqing
- Country of origin: China
- Original language: Mandarin
- No. of seasons: 2
- No. of episodes: 40 (Season One), 32 (Season Two)

Production
- Executive producer: Zhao Huayong
- Production locations: Huairou District, Beijing; Wuxi, Jiangsu
- Production company: CCTV

Original release
- Network: CCTV-1
- Release: April 15 – May 10, 2001

Related
- The Grand Mansion Gate 2

The Grand Mansion Gate (Chinese: 大宅门; pinyin: Dàzháimén) is a 2001 Chinese historical television series written and directed by Guo Baochang. Guo is also the author of the original novel of the same name. The television series stars Siqin Gaowa, Chen Baoguo, Liu Peiqi, Du Yulu, He Saifei, Jiang Wenli, and Zhang Fengyi. Prominent Chinese directors Zhang Yimou and Chen Kaige also make cameo appearances.

Guo Baochang spent over 40 years writing the script for film. Guo had sole discretion with the early script, and eventually wrote approximately 4 drafts. The television series began production in 2000 and finished filming in 2001. A second season was completed in 2003.

The Grand Mansion Gate details the story of the rise and fall of the time-honored brand Baicao Hall and the frustrations and fates of three generations of the Bai family.

The series premiered on CCTV-1 in mainland China on 15 April 2001 and in Hong Kong on June 4.

== Synopsis ==
In 1880 during the 6th year of the Guangxu period (1875–1908) of the Qing dynasty (1644–1911), Bai Jingqi (Chen Baoguo) is born into the Baicao Hall, a prominent merchant family in Beijing. The first season chronicles the lives of Bai Jingqi's predecessors in the late Qing and early Republic of China before focusing on Bai Jingqi when he becomes the new family patriarch. The subsequent season details his later life after the second Sino-Japanese War through to the establishment of the People's Republic of China.

== Cast ==
=== Main ===
- Chen Baoguo as Bai Jingqi (白景琦), Liu Cihang and Wang Cihang portray Bai Jingqi as a child.

The series' main protagonist, patriarch and head of the Baicao Hall. Born to Bai Yingxuan and his wife Wen Shi, Jingqi never once cried in his childhood years, and was branded by his uncle Bai Yingyu as an unlucky omen. He succeeded his mother as the head of the Baicao Hall. Notoriously hot-tempered, Jingqi maintains a strict grip on the family and its influence as years of revolution and instability plaguing China in the late 19th to mid-20th Century tests the prestige of his time-honored family name.

- He Saifei as Yang Jiuhong (杨九红).

One of Bai Jingqi's concubines, who was formerly a prostitute. Yang's status as a former prostitute results in years of disdain and abuse by the Bai family, notably from Jingqi's mother, Bai Wen Shi. The series marks the second time He and Zhang Yimou are working together, having worked together ten years prior on the set of his film Raise the Red Lantern, where she played a similar character of low-social status struggling against members of a wealthy household.

- Xie Lan as Li Xiangxiu (李香秀).

Bai Jingqi's second wife, originally a servant girl sold to the Bai family by her parents. Her years as a servant girl allowed her to see the bitter rivalries surrounding Jingqi and his concubines, which she uses to her advantage. She begins an affair with Bai Jingqi and uses his favor to maneuver her way into becoming his second wife, thus granting her a higher title and status, notably over Yang Jiuhong, whose relentless bullying and abuse of another concubine resulted in the latter committing suicide.

- Siqin Gaowa as Mrs. Bai (Bai Wen Shi) (白文氏).

Bai Jingqi's mother and his predecessor as head of the Bai family. Her role was aggressively challenged by wealthy patriarchs, including her own brother-in-law Bai Yingyu, but upon successfully defending the family's secret medicinal formula from scheming entrepreneurs, she became the unquestioned matriarch of the Baicao Hall. She maintained the assets, wealth and prestige of the family, amassing influence by currying favor with imperial eunuchs of the Qing court, and outmaneuvering members of the Manchu nobility.

- Liu Peiqi as Bai Yingyu (白颖宇).

Bai Jingqi's uncle, spoiled in his childhood by his mother and overprotected in adulthood by his eldest brother, Bai Yingyu was a thrifty spender who rarely cared about the devastating effects brought to the Bai family. He became an entrepreneur, sponsoring brothels and fought bitterly against his sister-in-law Wen Shi, plotting to steal the family's secret medicinal formula to drive the Baicao Hall out of business, and taking her son Jingqi to a brothel when he was a child.

=== The Bai Family ===
- Du Yulu as Bai Mengtang (白萌堂), Bai Jingqi's paternal grandfather, the head of the Baicao Hall at the start of the series.
- Wang Liyuan as Mrs. Bai (Bai Zhou Shi) (白周氏), Bai Jingqi's paternal grandmother.
- Li Hongtao as Bai Yingyuan (白颖园), Bai Mengtang's eldest son.
- Zhao Lingqi as Mrs. Bai (Bai Yin Shi) (白殷氏), Bai Yingyuan's wife.
- Bi Yanjun as Bai Yingxuan (白颖轩), Bai Mengtang's second son and Bai Jingqi's father.
- Liu Peiqi as Bai Yingyu (白颖宇), Bai Mengtang's youngest son.
- Zhang Yan as Mrs. Bai (Bai Fang Shi) (白方氏), Bai Yingyu's wife.
- Li Ping as Bai Yaping (白雅萍), Bai Mengtang's youngest child and only daughter.
- Jia Xinguang as Bai Jingyi (白景怡), Bai Yingyuan's eldest son.
- Shang Ying as Wu Cuigu (乌翠姑), Bai Jingyi's wife.
  - Xu Boping as young Bai Jingyi.
- Cheng Xiangyin as Bai Jingshuang (白景双), Bai Yingyu's eldest son.
- Ai Liya as Bai Yufen (白玉芬), Bai Yingyuan's daughter.
  - Geng Sisi as young Bai Yufen.
- Li Shusheng as Bai Jingsi (白景泗), Bai Yingyuan's second son.
  - Wu Jianing as young Bai Jingsi.
- Liu Chao as Bai Jingwu (白景武), Bai Yingyu's second son.
  - Wang Chaoqun as young Bai Jingwu.
- Li Xiaolei as Bai Jinglu (白景陆), Bai Yingyuan's third son.
  - Chen Weiyou as young Bai Jinglu.
- Ru Ping as Huang Chun (黄春), Bai Jingqi's wife.
  - Chen Lingyue as young Huang Chun.
- Lei Juan as Huai Hua (槐花), Bai Jingqi's second concubine and a former servant girl.
- Jiang Wenli as Bai Yuting (白玉婷), Bai Yingxuan's youngest daughter.
  - Ma Sichun as young Bai Yuting.
- Ji Baozhong as Bai Jingsheng (白敬生), Bai Jingyi's eldest son.
- Zhao Yi as Bai Jingye (白敬业), Bai Jingqi and Huang Chun's eldest son.
- Zhang Yang as Bai Jinggong (白敬功), Bai Jingqi and Huang Chun's second son.
- Zhang Dinghan as Bai Jiali (白佳莉), Bai Jingqi and Yang Jiuhong's daughter.
- Liu Lingzhi as Bai Zhanyuan (白占元), Bai Jingqi's grandson and Bai Jingye's eldest son.

=== Supporting ===
- Zhang Fengyi as Ji Zengbu (季宗布), Bai Jingqi's teacher and a military officer in the Royal Guard Divine Engine Division. Zheng had worked alongside many of the main and supporting cast members, notably Siqin Gaowa and Chen Kaige.
- Yu Rongguang as Bai Hua.
- Li Xuejian as Master Yu (于八爷), a drug dealer in Beijing.
- Lei Kesheng as Wang Xiguang (王喜光), an imperial eunuch.
  - Yuan Zi as young Wang Xiguang.
- Ning Jing as Zhen'er (珍儿), madam of the brothel Yang Jiuhong worked at.
- Zhang Yimou as Li Lianying, an imperial eunuch of the Empress Dowager.
- Chen Kaige as an official in the local government.
- He Qun as Pitou'er (皮头儿), a worker at a pawnshop.
- Tian Zhuangzhuang as Taki (田木), a Japanese military officer.

== Production ==
=== Conception and development ===
In 1959 at the age of 19, Guo Baochang entered Beijing Film Academy and began to write the novel The Grand Mansion Gate. At the dawn of the Cultural Revolution, he was labeled as a "reactionary student" and was sent to Nankou Farm of Beijing to reform through labor. In order to avoid the attention of the Red Guards, he burned the original manuscript. In March 1969 he rewrote the novel. In 1980 he divorced his wife and the novel was burned by the furious woman. At the end of 1994, he rewrote the novel for the third and final time.

Baicao Hall (百草厅) took inspiration from Tong Ren Tang, one of the time-honored pharmaceutical companies in China founded at the beginning of the Qing dynasty and which has lasted for almost 350 years. Guo Baochang himself had lived there for more than 26 years.

The main character Bai Jingqi was inspired by Yue Jingyu (乐镜宇), Guo Baochang's foster father and founder of the Hong Ji Tang pharmaceutical company. The characters Bai Yuting and Li Xiangxiu were inspired by Guo's twelfth aunt and a concubine of Yue Jingyu's, respectively.

=== Casting ===
Directors Zhang Yimou, Chen Kaige, He Qun and Tian Zhuangzhuang joined the cast. Actors Yu Rongguang, Li Xuejian, Ning Jing and Lei Kesheng were cast in supporting roles for the series.

=== Filming ===
Principal photography started in 2000 and wrapped in 2001.

== Music ==
No.	Title	Lyrics	Music	Singers	Length
1.	"The Grand Mansion Gate" (Opening theme)	Yi Ming	Zhao Jiping	Hu Xiaoqing

== Broadcast ==
The Grand Mansion Gate was broadcast in mainland China in April 2001 and two months later was aired in Hong Kong.
