= 3rd Beijing College Student Film Festival =

1996 film festival in Beijing, China

The 3rd Beijing College Student Film Festival (simplified Chinese: 第三届北京大学生电影节; traditional Chinese: 第三屆北京大學生電影節) was held in 1996 in Beijing, China. The Accused Uncle Shangang was the biggest winner, receiving two awards, including Best Film Award and Best Actor Award.

== Awards ==
- Best Film Award: The Accused Uncle Shangang
- Best Director Award: Li Shaohong for Red Powder
- Best Actor Award: Li Rentang for The Accused Uncle Shangang
- Best Actress Award: None
- Best Visual Effects Award: Narrow Escape
- Committee Special Award: A Mongolian Tale
- Special Jury Award: Long Live Soldiers
