= Pan Yu =

Chinese actress and play director

- Born: October 28, 1924; Hangzhou, Zhejiang, China
- Died: 11 January 2015 (aged 90); Guangzhou, Guangdong, China
- Occupations: actress, director
- Years active: 1946 - 2015
- Spouse: Shi Jin (m. 1946; died 2015)
- Awards: Huabiao Awards – Outstanding Actress; 1998 Live in Peace and Contentment Golden Rooster Awards – Special Jury Award; 1997 Live in Peace and Contentment

Chinese name
- Traditional Chinese: 潘予
- Simplified Chinese: 潘予
Transcriptions

Pan Yu (28 October 1924 in Hangzhou, China – 11 January 2015 in Guangzhou, China), was a Chinese actress and play director. When Pan was 14 years old, she started her career as actress of local drama club. In 1946, Pan joined the China Dance Drama Society, and toured Malaysia. For critical acclaimed performance in Live in Peace and Contentment (1997), she won a Golden Rooster Award, a Golden Goblet Award and a Huabiao Award.

== Selected filmography ==
=== Film ===
Year	Title	Role	Notes
1984	Many Ways To The Life	Mom	
1984	Tree of Life and Death	San Bo Po	
1985	Military Spouse	Grandma	
1994	Women Flowers	Old lesbian	
1997	Live in Peace and Contentment	A Xi Po	Golden Goblet Award for Best Actress; Golden Rooster Award for Special Jury Award; Huabiao Award for Outstanding Actress; Nominated - Golden Rooster Award for Best Actress

=== Theater ===
Year	Title	Role	Notes
1958	Thunder on Zhujiang River	Liang Tian	
1960	Red Crag	Jiang Jie	
1963	Young Generation	Director	
1985	Saver Her	Director	
1988	Rent Bride	Director	
