= The Black Mountain (film) =

1994 film by Zhou Xiaowen

- Film poster
- Directed by: Zhou Xiaowen
- Written by: Zhou Xiaowen; Zhu Jianxin
- Starring: Ai Liya; Zhao Xiaorui; Xie Yuan
- Cinematography: Zhou Xiaowen
- Production company: Xi'an Film Studio
- Release date: 1994
- Running time: 97 minutes
- Country: China
- Language: Mandarin

The Black Mountain (Chinese: 黑山路; pinyin: Hēi Shānlù; lit. 'Black Mountain Road') is a 1994 drama film by Zhou Xiaowen, who served as the director, co-writer and cinematographer. Like other films from this director, the narrative refers to sexuality and violence and the principal characters are men who are troubled. Ai Liya stars as the woman. Zhao Xiaorui is the elder brother. Xie Yuan is the sixth brother.

In the film, a woman whose name is not given in the film, lives in a makeshift inn and has porters as customers. One group of porters kills her husband and seizes her and her inn. Two of the porters fight over the woman and the property. One is stronger and a brute and the other is gentler and wants to convince the woman to be his wife.

An entry in Encyclopedia of Chinese Film stated that Zhou "uses beautiful camera work and mise-en-scène to convey the emotionally charged situation."

== Cast ==
- Ai Liya
- Zhao Xiaorui
- Xie Yuan
