= Tao Wei =

Tao Wei may refer to:

- Tao Wei (footballer, born 1966) (died 2012), Chinese footballer and CCTV commentator
- Tao Wei (footballer, born 1978), Chinese footballer
