= Genghis Khan (1998 film) =

1998 Chinese film by Sai Fu and Mai Lisi

- Film poster
- Directed by: Sai Fu; Mai Lisi
- Written by: Ran Ping
- Produced by: Jianlin Cheng
- Starring: Ai Liya; Tumen
- Cinematography: Mu Deyuan
- Edited by: Zhang Jianhua
- Music by: Cao Daoerji
- Production company: Inner Mongolia Film Studio
- Release date: 23 May 1998
- Running time: 113 minutes
- Country: China
- Languages: Mandarin; Mongolian

Genghis Khan (Chinese: 一代天骄成吉思汗) is a 1998 Chinese biographical historical drama film directed by Sai Fu and Mai Lisi, produced by Inner Mongolia Film Studio. It depicts the first half of the life of the titular historical figure Genghis Khan.

== Cast and roles ==
- Ai Liya as Hoelun
- Tumen as Genghis Khan
- Baasanjav Mijid as Talihutai (as Basen)
- Bayaertu as Tesugai - Temujin's Father
- Asiru as Boerte
- Qienaritu as Zhamuho

== Awards and nominations ==
- The film was selected as the Chinese entry for the Best Foreign Language Film at the 71st Academy Awards, but was not accepted as a nominee.
- 5th Beijing College Student Film Festival: Jury Award for Best Actress - Ai Liya
- Changchun Film Festival: Golden Deer Award for Best Actress - Ai Liya
- Golden Phoenix Award: Society Award
- Shanghai International Film Festival: Golden Goblet Award for Best Actress - Ai Liya
- Golden Rooster Award for Best Actress: Ai Liya - Nominated

== See also ==
- List of submissions to the 71st Academy Awards for Best Foreign Language Film
- List of Chinese submissions for the Academy Award for Best Foreign Language Film
