= Paul Kersey (actor) =

American actor

- Born: Paul Neumann; February 10, 1970 (age 56); Ada, Minnesota, U.S.
- Spouse: Ning Jing (m. 1997–2011)
- Children: 1

Paul Kersey (born February 10, 1970) is an American actor, best known for his time on Days of Our Lives as Alan Harris. He starred opposite Ning Jing in the Feng Xiaoning films Red River Valley (1997) and Lover's Grief over the Yellow River (1999). Kersey also portrayed the younger version of David Banner in Hulk (2003). On television, he played the son of James Coburn's character in Missing Pieces (2000). He has quit acting and has not returned to it. He lives now in Ada, Minnesota.
