= Hold Your Hands =

- Chinese: 十八洞村
- Hanyu Pinyin: Shíbādòng Cūn
- Directed by: Miao Yue
- Written by: Miao Yue
- Produced by: Feng Kexiang
- Starring: Wang Xueqi; Chen Jin
- Production companies: Xiaoxiang Film Group Co., Ltd. Emei Film Group Co., Ltd. Huaxia Film Distribution
- Distributed by: Huaxia Film Distribution
- Release date: 13 October 2017
- Running time: 124 minutes
- Country: China
- Language: Mandarin

Hold Your Hands (Chinese: 十八洞村) is a 2017 Chinese drama film written and directed by Miao Yue and starring Wang Xueqi and Chen Jin. The film premiered in China on October 13, 2017. The film follows the story of a veteran leading villagers out of poverty and into wealth in Xiangxi Tujia and Miao Autonomous Prefecture, central China's Hunan province. It is produced jointly by Xiaoxiang Film Group Co., Ltd., Emei Film Group Co., Ltd. and Huaxia Film Distribution.

== Cast ==
- Wang Xueqi as Yang Yingjun, an ex-serviceman.
- Chen Jin as Sister Ma, Yang's wife.
- Mo Yang as Xiao Long, a volunteer.
- Bai Wei
- Chen Xibei
- Bardon
- Sun Min
- Ngawang Rinchen

== Production ==
In November 2013, Chinese Communist Party general secretary Xi Jinping visited the remote village Shibadong (Chinese: 十八洞), he proposed to take targeted measures in poverty alleviation for the first time.

Production started on April 28, 2017 and ended on September 28 of that same year. The film took place in Shuanglong Town of Huayuan County.

== Release ==
On September 26, 2017, the first official trailer for the film was released along with a teaser poster.

The film premiered in Beijing on October 9, 2017 with wide-release in China on October 13, 2017.

== Accolades ==
Date	Award	Category	Recipient(s) and nominee(s)	Result	Notes
2018	25th Beijing College Student Film Festival	Organizing Committee Award	Hold Your Hands	Won	
2018	34th Hundred Flowers Awards	Best Actress	Chen Jin	Won	
2018	17th Huabiao Awards	Outstanding Actress	Chen Jin	Won	
2018	17th Huabiao Awards	Outstanding Film	Hold Your Hands	Won	
2018	17th Huabiao Awards	Outstanding Writer	Miao Yue	Won	
