= Lü Liping =

Chinese actress

- 吕丽萍
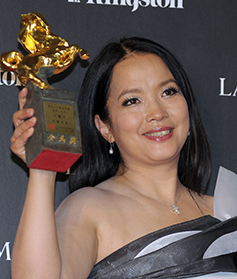
- Lü at the 47th Golden Horse Awards
- Born: April 3, 1960 (age 66); Beijing, China
- Education: Central Academy of Drama
- Occupation: Actress
- Years active: 1984–present
- Spouses: Zhang Fengyi (m. 1988; div. 1991) Tao Wei (m. 1999; div. 2001) Sun Haiying (m. 2002)
- Children: 1

Chinese name
- Traditional Chinese: 呂麗萍
- Simplified Chinese: 吕丽萍
Transcriptions
Standard Mandarin
- Hanyu Pinyin: Lǚ Lìpíng

Lǚ Lìpíng (Chinese: 吕丽萍; born 3 April 1960) is a Chinese actress.

Her career accolades include one Golden Rooster Award, Flying Apsaras Award, Golden Horse Award, and Golden Phoenix Award, as well as two Hundred Flowers Awards, Golden Eagle Awards and Chinese Film Media Awards. She has also won the 6th Tokyo International Film Festival – Best Actress, 1st Singapore International Film Festival – Best Actress, and 13th Shanghai International Film Festival – Best Actress.

== Biography ==
Lü was born in Beijing on April 3, 1960. After graduating from Central Academy of Drama in 1984, she was assigned to Shanghai Film Studio as an actress.

== Personal life ==
She has married three times. She married her first husband, actor Zhang Fengyi, in 1988, with whom she had a son, Zhang Boyu (张博宇). The couple divorced in 1991.

She married for the second time on January 16, 1999, in Los Angeles, to Tao Wei, a Chinese footballer. They divorced in 2001.

She married actor Sun Haiying in 2002 in Shenyang, Liaoning.

== Filmography ==
=== Film ===
Year	English title	Chinese title	Role	Notes
1984	Childhood Friends	《童年的朋友》	Sister Luo	
1985	The Zhang Family's Daughter-in-Law	《张家少奶奶》	Zhang Wenying	
1985	Under the Big Tree	《大树底下》	Wuyue	
1986	Old Well	《老井》	Duan Xifeng	
1986	Hey! Brother	《嘿！哥儿们》	guest	
1987		《危险的蜜月旅行》	guest	
1988		《龙年警官》	Wife	
1988		《荒火》	a girl	
1990		《大气层消失》	a woman	
1990	Fortress Besieged	《围城》	Sun Roujia	
1990	Bitter Experience Fervor	《遭遇激情》	Liang Xiaoqing	
1991	No Regrets About Youth	《青春无悔》	former wife	
1991	The Lone Woman	《独身女人》	guest	
1993	The Blue Kite	《蓝风筝》	Chen Shujuan	
1997	The Story of Editorial Department 2	《编辑部的故事之万事如意》	Ge Ling	
1998	Beijing People	《北京人》	Zeng Siying	
1999	Love Will Tear Us Apart	《天上人间》	A Yan	
2000		《好日子一块过》	Sister Lu	
2001	The Marriage Certificate	《谁说我不在乎》	Xie Yuting	
2001	Shanghai Woman	《假装没感觉》	Mother	
2002	The Holidays in My Heart	《心中的节日》	guest	
2003	Two Families Together	《团圆两家亲》	Xin Ran	
2008	24 City	《二十四城记》	Da Li	
2010	Traffic Jam	《堵车》	Nian Hua	
2010	Under the Hawthorn Tree	《山楂树之恋》	guest	
2010	City Monkey	《玩酷青春》	Luo Sufang	
2010		《百合》	a female writer	
2011	The Sino-Japanese War at Sea 1894	《1894·甲午大海战》	Empress Dowager Cixi	
2012	The Marriage	《今世姻缘》	Yao Jin'e	
2013	Our Sunny Lives	《我们的生活充满阳光》	Zhang Yuying	
2016	Out of Ordinary	《非同小可》		

=== Television ===
Year	English title	Chinese title	Role	Notes
1987	Moon of the Mountains	《山月》	Shan Yue	
1989	Fortress Besieged	《围城》	Sun Roujia	
1990	The Story of Editorial Department	《编辑部的故事》	Ge Ling	
1996		《雷锋的死与我有关》	Qiao Anshan's Wife	
1997		《康熙情锁金殿》	Mother Han	
1997		《看不见的太阳》	guest	
1998		《来来往往》	Duan Li'na	
1998	Home With a Capable Wife	《家有仙妻2》	Mother Zhuo	
2001	The Young Wong Fei Hung	《少年黄飞鸿》	Wu Xian	
2001		《七品钦差》	guest	
2001	The Years of Intense Emotion	《激情燃烧的岁月》	Chu Qin	
2001		《大栅栏》	Empress Dowager Cixi	
2002	Gatherings of Heroes	《群英会》	Aunt Feng	
2002	Princess Shisan	《十三格格》	Empress Dowager Cixi	
2002	Empress Ma	《大脚马皇后》	Empress Ma	
2003	High Flying Songs of Tang Dynasty	《大唐歌飞》	Consort Mei	
2003	The Legend of the Condor Heroes	《射雕英雄传》	Li Ping	
2004	The Queen is Here	《皇后驾到》	Empress Ma	
2006	A Happy Man and Wife	《非常夫妻》	Tian Ge	
2006		《谁为梦想买单》	Ma Cuilan	
2006	The Most Pro-Enemy	《最亲的敌人》	Doctor Tang	
2007	The Son of the Mountains	《大山的儿子》	Deng Shufen	
2008	Tiandi Minxin	《天地民心》	Wife Liu	
2008		《天伦劫》	Lin Qiuxia	
2008		《人活一张脸》	Pan Fengxia	
2010	Shachun	《傻春》	Xu Minrong	
2010	You Are My Brother	《你是我兄弟》	Sister Qin	
2011	From General To Soldier	《从将军到士兵》	Li Lujin	
2012		《传承》	guest	
2012	Life Always Beautiful	《生活永远沸腾》	Li Xinfeng	
2013	8848	《8848》	guest	
2013		《让生活充满阳光》	Zhang Yuying	
2013	The New Story of Editorial Department	《新编辑部的故事》	Ge Ling	

== Awards ==
Year	Work	Award	Result	Notes
1988	Old Well	8th Golden Rooster Award for Best Supporting Actress	Won	
1988	Old Well	11th Hundred Flowers Award for Best Supporting Actress	Won	
1988	Old Well	1st Golden Phoenix Award	Won	
1991	Bitter Experience Fervor	11th Golden Rooster Award for Best Actress	Nominated	
1992	No Regrets About Youth	15th Hundred Flowers Award for Best Supporting Actress	Won	
1992	The Blue Kite	6th Tokyo International Film Festival – Best Actress	Won	
1992	The Blue Kite	1st Singapore International Film Festival – Best Actress	Won	
1992	The Story of Editorial Department	12th Flying Apsaras Award for Outstanding Actress	Won	
1998	Spicy Love Soup	18th Golden Rooster Award for Best Supporting Actress	Nominated	
1999	Tianshang Renjian	36th Golden Horse Award for Best Supporting Actress	Nominated	
2002	The Years of Intense Emotion	20th Golden Eagle Award for Most Popular Actress	Won	
2002	The Marriage Certificate	2nd Chinese Film Media Award for Best Actress	Won	
2003	Empress Ma	21st Golden Eagle Award for Most Popular Actress	Won	
2003	Shanghai Woman	3rd Chinese Film Media Award for Most Popular Actress	Won	
2010	City Monkey	13th Shanghai International Film Festival – Best Actress	Won	
2010	City Monkey	47th Golden Horse Award for Best Actress	Won	
2011	City Monkey	14th Huabiao Award for Best Actress	Nominated	
2011	City Monkey	28th Golden Rooster Award for Best Actress	Nominated	
