= Huabiao Award for Outstanding Actress =

Annual Chinese film award

The Huabiao Award for Outstanding Actress was first awarded in 1995.

== Winners & nominations ==
=== 2020s ===
Year	Number	Actress	Film
2025	20th	Kara Wai	Love Never Ends
2025	20th	Ma Li	Article 20
2023	19th	Zhang Zifeng	Sister
2023	19th	Jia Ling	Hi, Mom
2020 (Note: The awards ceremony was held on May 23, 2023 alongside 19th ceremony instead of in late 2020 due to COVID-19.)	18th	Ren Suxi	My People, My Country
2020	18th	Yuan Quan	The Captain

=== 2010s ===
Year	Number	Actress	Film
2018	17th	Chen Jin	Hold Your Hands
2018	17th	Tong Liya	How Long Will I Love U
2015	16th	Bai Baihe	Go Away Mr. Tumor
2015	16th	Gong Li	Coming Home
2013	15th	Zhang Ziyi	The Grandmaster
2013	15th	Yan Bingyan	Feng Shui
2013	15th	Song Jia	Falling Flowers
2013	15th	Bai Baihe	Love Is Not Blind
2011	14th	Naren Hua	E Ji
2011	14th	Xu Fan	Aftershock
2011	14th	Qin Hailu	The Piano in a Factory
2011	14th	Lü Liping	City Monkey

=== 2000s ===
Year	Number	Actress	Film
2009	13th	Fan Zhibo	Emergency
2009	13th	Zhang Ziyi	Forever Enthralled
2009	13th	Dong Ling	Hengping Shuzhi
2009	13th	Jiang Qinqin	City Of Dream
2007	12th	Li Bingbing	The Knot
2007	12th	Ding Jiali	The Lane Premier
2007	12th	Wu Yue	Road To Dawn
2007	12th	Zhu Yuanyuan	The Forest Ranger
2005	11th	Zhao Wei	A Time to Love
2005	11th	Zhang Ziyi	House of Flying Daggers
2005	11th	Naren Hua	Season of the Horse
2005	11th	Zhang Yu	Ren Changxia
2004	10th	Ju Xue	Splendid Season
2004	10th	Jiang Wenli	My Bitter Sweet Taiwan/台湾往事
2004	10th	Li Min	The 17 Years Old Nuoma
2004	10th	Tao Hong	38°
2004	10th	Zhang Ziyi	Jasmine Women
2003	9th	Huang Suying	Gone Is the One Who Held Me Dearest in the World
2003	9th	Ni Ping	Pretty Big Feet
2003	9th	Chen Hong	Together
2003	9th	Xu Jinglei	I Love You
2003	9th	Yuan Quan	Pretty Big Feet
2002	8th	Tao Hong	Life Show
2002	8th	Yu Hui	Qiao Feng
2001	7th	Xie Lan	Farewell to Death
2001	7th	Xi Meijuan	Full Moon Tonight
2000	6th	Jiang Wenli	Team Spirit
2000	6th	Chen Jin	Launch Shock To Be Born

=== 1990s ===
Year	Number	Actress	Film
1999	5th	Xu Fan	Be There or Be Square
1999	5th	Mei Ting	A Time to Remember
1998	4th	Tao Hong	Colors of the Blind
1998	4th	Pan Yu	Live in Peace and Contentment
1997	3rd	Yu Hui	Xi Lian
1996	2nd	Cao Cuifen	Orphan's Tears
1995	1st	Ai Liya	Ermo
