= The Sun on the Roof of the World =

1992 film by Xie Fei, Ping Wang

- Directed by: Xie Fei; Wang Ping
- Written by: Shiying Huang
- Produced by: Guangxi Film Studio
- Starring: Guoqing Liang; Huang Jiao; Ai Liya
- Cinematography: Baogui Liu
- Music by: Wanchun Shi
- Release date: 1992
- Running time: 99 minutes
- Country: China
- Language: Mandarin

The Sun on the Roof of the World (Chinese: 世界屋脊的太阳; pinyin: Shìjiè wūjǐ de tàiyang) is a Chinese drama film released in 1992 and directed by Xie Fei. A major theme of the film is the industrialization of Tibet.

== Plot ==
Fang Jingsheng is a young drilling engineer from Beijing who is leaving for Tibet to work on a geothermal development project. His girlfriend Milan, a postgraduate student wants him to return to China and marry her. He goes back against the will of his father, who is the project manager.

After arriving in Beijing, Milan informs him that she wants to leave for the US immediately after their marriage. Fang decides not to marry her and returns to Tibet. Meanwhile, Milan becomes pregnant and goes to the US, where she arranges travel documents for Fang. In Tibet, a blowout occurs on the project and Fang sacrifices himself in an effort to stop the impending explosion.

== Cast ==
- Guoqing Liang
- Huang Jiao
- Ai Liya as Buddhist nun
