= Twin of Brothers (2011 TV series) =

2011 Chinese wuxia television series

- Official poster
- 大唐雙龍傳之長生訣
- Genre: Wuxia; Action
- Based on: Twin of Brothers by Huang Yi
- Written by: Wang Yeng
- Directed by: Wong Jing
- Starring: Danny Chan; Alex Fong; Athena Chu; You Yong; Kong Lin; Cherrie Ying; Wu Qingzhe; Zheng Xiaodong; Li Jiajia; Xu Jiaoning; Si Guangmin; Tian Leixi
- Country of origin: China
- Original language: Mandarin
- No. of episodes: 38

Production
- Executive producers: Tie Fo; Ma Runsheng
- Producer: Wong Jing
- Production locations: Hengdian World Studios, China
- Camera setup: Multi camera
- Production companies: China International Television Corporation; China Radio, Film & Television Programs Exchanging Center; Shanghai New Culture Media Group; Beijing Fuyuan Film & Television Culture Group

Original release
- Network: CCTV-1
- Release: 8 August – 30 August 2011

Twin of Brothers
- Traditional Chinese: 大唐雙龍傳之長生訣
- Simplified Chinese: 大唐双龙传之长生诀
Transcriptions
Standard Mandarin
- Hanyu Pinyin: Dà Táng Shuāng Lóng Zhuàn Zhī Cháng Shēng Jué
Yue: Cantonese
- Jyutping: Daai6 Tong4 Seong1 Lung4 Zyun2 Zi1 Ceong4 Sang1 Kyut3

Twin of Brothers is a 2011 Chinese wuxia television series directed by prolific Hong Kong film director Wong Jing adapted from Huang Yi's novel of the same Chinese title. The series stars Hong Kong actors Danny Chan and Alex Fong as the "Twin Dragons", Kou Zhong and Xu Zhiling respectively. Executive producer Tie Fo stated this series will the first in a trilogy in order to fully explore Huang's novel. The series aired on CCTV-1 from 8 to 30 August 2011.

== Cast ==
- Danny Chan as Kou Zhong (寇仲)
- Alex Fong as Xu Zhiling (徐子陵)
- Athena Chu as Fu Junzhuo / Fu Junyu (傅君婥/傅君瑜)
- You Yong as Yuwen Huafan (宇文化及)
- Kong Lin as Zhen Sao (貞嫂)
- Cherrie Ying as Li Xiuning (李秀寧)
- Wu Qingzhe as Li Shimin (李世民)
- Zheng Xiaodong as Song Shidao (宋師道)
- Li Jiajia as Shi Feixuan (師妃暄)
- Xu Jiaoning as Zhai Jiao (翟嬌)
- Si Guangmin as Song Yuzhi (宋玉致)
- Tian Leixi as Guaguan (婠婠)
- Little Wong Jing as Shen Luoya (沈落雁)
- Ge Xiaofeng as Susu (素素)
- Jiang Yuqing as Xian Yuanjing (單婉晶)
- Li Haokui as Arms Sponsor (軍火供應商)
- Kao Hu as Sui Yangdi (隋煬帝)
- Wang Jiusheng as Qin Shubao (秦叔寶)
- Pang Guochang as Eunuch Xiao (蕭公公)
- Shi Mingjiao as Caishao (柴紹)
- Hu Ke as Shuang Xiuxun (商秀珣)

== See also ==
- Twin of Brothers
