= No Regrets About Youth =

- DVD cover
- Traditional Chinese: 青春無悔
- Simplified Chinese: 青春无悔
- Hanyu Pinyin: Qīngchūn Wú Huǐ
- Directed by: Zhou Xiaowen
- Screenplay by: Wang Shuo; Wei Ren
- Based on: No Regrets About Youth by Wang Shuo
- Starring: Zhang Fengyi; Shi Lan; Lü Liping; Jin Yaqin
- Cinematography: Zhou Xiaowen
- Music by: Zhao Jiping
- Production company: Xi'an Film Studio
- Release date: 1992
- Running time: 101 minutes
- Country: China
- Language: Mandarin

No Regrets About Youth (simplified Chinese: 青春无悔; traditional Chinese: 青春無悔; pinyin: Qīngchūn Wú Huǐ) is a 1992 drama film by Zhou Xiaowen. It is based on the novel of the same name by Wang Shuo.

The film explores the redevelopment of Beijing in the 1990s. In the film, a bulldozer operator destroys a siheyuan courtyard house that is the residence of his girlfriend. Xiaoping Lin, author of Children of Marx and Coca-Cola: Chinese Avant-Garde Art and Independent Cinema, wrote that the scene compares the destruction of the house to a rape of a woman.
