= Yu Hui (actress) =

Chinese actress (born 1965)

- Born: 1 December 1965 (age 59); Qingdao, Shandong, China
- Occupation: actress
- Years active: 1986–present
- Spouse: Guo (m. 1997)
- Awards: Huabiao Awards – Outstanding Actress; 1997 Xi Lian; 2002 Qiao Feng Golden Rooster Awards – Best Actress; 1997 Xi Lian

Chinese name
- Traditional Chinese: 于慧
- Simplified Chinese: 于慧
Transcriptions

Yu Hui (born 1 December 1965) is a Chinese actress. She was born in Qingdao, grew up in Shenyang, and graduated from Shanghai Theatre Academy.

== Selected filmography ==
=== Film ===
Year	Title	Role	Notes
1986	Strange Stories	Yun Cui Xian	Segment "Yun Cui Xian"
1989	Hell and Heaven	Jingling	
1990	Sworn Friends	Qi Manling	
1996	Xi Liang	Xi Liang	Golden Rooster Award for Best Actress; Huabiao Award for Outstanding Actress
2000	Hi, Frank	Nizi	
2001	Qiao Feng	Qiao Feng	Huabiao Award for Outstanding Actress

=== Television series ===
Year	Title	Role	Notes
1989	Fortress Besieged	Mrs. Wang	
1994	Wu Zetian	Consort Xiao	
1996	Emperor Wu of Han	Empress Chen	
2001	Life Show	Lai Shuangyang	
