= In the Name of the People (TV series) =

Chinese TV series

- Traditional Chinese: 人民的名義
- Simplified Chinese: 人民的名义
- Hanyu Pinyin: Rénmín de míngyì
- Genre: Political drama
- Based on: In the Name of People by Zhou Meisen
- Written by: Zhou Meisen; Sun Xinyue
- Directed by: Li Lu
- Presented by: Fan Ziwen; Gao Yalin; Chen Jingzhu; Li Xuezheng; An Xiaofen; Li Gong; Jiang Hao; Li Lu
- Starring: Lu Yi; Zhang Fengyi; Wu Gang; Xu Yajun; Zhang Zhijian; Ke Lan; Hu Jing; Zhang Kaili; Ding Haifeng; Gao Yalin
- Narrated by: Xu Tao
- Ending theme: In the Name of the People (以人民的名义, Yǐ rénmín de míngyì) performed by Han Lei and Vivi Jiang
- Composer: Dong Dongdong
- Country of origin: China
- Original language: Mandarin
- No. of seasons: 1
- No. of episodes: 55

Production
- Executive producers: Meng Shouping; Huang Lin; Wang Yun; Sun Heping; Pei Yi; Peng Cheng; Chen Xunhua
- Producers: Li Lu; Gao Yalin
- Cinematography: Cui Weidong
- Editor: Cao Weijie
- Running time: 45 minutes

Original release
- Network: Hunan Television
- Release: 28 March – 28 April 2017

In the Name of the People (Chinese: 人民的名义; pinyin: Rénmín de míngyì) is a 2017 Chinese television drama series based on the web novel by Zhou Meisen. Its plot revolves around a prosecutor's efforts to unearth corruption in a present-day fictional Chinese city. It drew large audiences in China, where its release coincided with Xi Jinping's anti-corruption campaign. It is the first broadcast political drama featuring high-level government corruption in China since 2004.

The production received significant government funding from the Supreme People's Procuratorate, the highest agency responsible for both investigation and prosecution in China. The intervention from censors was much lighter due to the support of the authorities. The series is considered by some western observers as the Chinese version of House of Cards.

The program's stars include Lu Yi as detective Hou Liangping, Xu Yajun as his antagonist Qi Tongwei, and Zhang Fengyi as Sha Ruijin, the provincial Party Committee Secretary. Zhou Meisen and his wife Sun Xinyue adapted Zhou's book for television. It was primarily filmed in Nanjing, the capital of Jiangsu province.

== Synopsis ==
In the Name of the People chronicles the internal power struggle of the Chinese Communist Party in the fictional city of Jingzhou, Handong province. The series depicts fictional communist party disciplinary investigators seeking to bring corrupt senior cadre to justice.

== Cast ==
- Lu Yi as Hou Liangping
- Zhang Fengyi as Sha Ruijin
- Wu Gang as Li Dakang
- Xu Yajun (许亚军) as Qi Tongwei
- Zhang Zhijian (张志坚) as Gao Yuliang
- Ke Lan (柯蓝) as Lu Yike
- Bai Zhidi (白志迪) as Chen Yanshi
- Li Guangfu (李光复) as Zheng Xipo
- Hu Jing (胡静) as Gao Xiaoqin
- Ding Haifeng (丁海峰) as Zhao Donglai
- Zhang Xilin (张晞临) as Cai Chenggong
- Li Jianyi (李建义) as Ji Changming
- Huang Junpeng (黄俊鹏) as Chen Hai
- Han Benben (阚犇犇) as Zheng Shengli
- Tang Wan (唐菀) as Lin Huahua
- Yue Xiuqing (岳秀清) as Ouyang Jing
- Ji Shuai (纪帅) as Zhou Zheng
- Xu Wenguang as Ding Yizhen
- Xu Guangyu (徐光宇) as Cheng Du
- Li Wei (李威) as Sun Liancheng
- Zhang Kaili (张凯丽) as Wu Huifen
- Li Xinyue (李昕岳) as Zhang Baobao
- Huang Pinyuan (黄品沅) as Yi Xuexi
- Hao Guang (郝光) as Qin Siyuan
- Zhao Ziqi (赵子琪) as Zhong Xiao'ai
- Hou Yong as Zhao Dehan
- Gao Yalin (高亚麟) as Liu Xinjian

== Reception ==
In the Name of the People was an instant success in terms of viewership. The drama also surpassed 7% in ratings, breaking the single day ratings record for a Chinese drama. The series also received the praise from People's Daily, the Communist Party's newspaper.

However, some dissidents, such as cartoonist Rebel Pepper, treated the series as a way for the authorities to manipulate and fool the public. The core of the series is that anti-graft efforts could only be conducted by a strong government rather than democratic elections or a free press, as The New York Times commented.

== Ratings ==
Premiere ratings
Air date	Episode	CSM52 city network ratings			CSM National Network ratings		
Air date	Episode	Ratings (%)	Audience share (%)	Rank	Ratings (%)	Audience share (%)	Rank
2017.3.28	1	1.523	4.49	1	2.41	7.37	1
2017.3.29	2	1.490	4.69	1	2.30	7.31	1
2017.3.30	3-4	1.270	4.02	1	1.62	5.41	1
2017.3.31	5	1.084	3.370	1	1.61	5.66	1
2017.4.1	6	1.239	3.97	1	1.46	4.83	1
2017.4.2	7-8	1.505	4.77	1	1.60	5.30	1
2017.4.3	9-10	1.820	5.89	1	1.84	6.05	1
2017.4.4	11-12	2.024	6.34	1	2.03	6.82	1
2017.4.5	13-14	2.264	7.11	1	2.16	7.33	1
2017.4.6	15-16	2.444	7.70	1	2.18	7.47	1
2017.4.7	17	2.083	6.42	1	1.93	6.36	1
2017.4.8	18	2.275	6.94	1	2.06	6.59	1
2017.4.9	19-20	3.035	9.01	1	2.57	8.31	1
2017.4.10	21-22	3.287	10.30	1	2.77	9.29	1
2017.4.11	23-24	3.524	11.09	1	2.93	9.89	1
2017.4.12	25-26	3.649	11.79	1	2.87	9.91	1
2017.4.13	27-28	3.711	12.05	1	3.15	11.00	1
2017.4.14	29	3.020	9.670	1	2.41	8.19	1
2017.4.15	30	3.138	10.132	1	2.39	8.17	1
2017.4.16	31-32	4.202	12.80	1	3.20	10.50	1
2017.4.17	33-34	4.793	15.44	1	3.51	11.99	1
2017.4.18	35-36	5.061	16.70	1	3.78	13.35	1
2017.4.19	37-38	5.356	17.15	1	4.02	13.72	1
2017.4.20	39-40	5.465	16.97	1	3.91	13.33	1
2017.4.21	41	4.432	13.86	1	3.51	11.42	1
2017.4.22	42	4.311	14.18	1	3.04	10.84	1
2017.4.23	43	6.069	20.14	1	4.30	16.44	1
2017.4.24	44-45	5.801	18.65	1	4.39	15.06	1
2017.4.25	46-47	6.123	18.89	1	4.78	15.97	1
2017.4.26	48-49	6.682	20.78	1	5.27	17.45	1
2017.4.27	50-51	6.695	21.25	1	5.46	18.62	1
2017.4.28	52	6.666	20.13	1	5.58	17.76	1
Average ratings		3.661	11.53	1	3.03	10.24	1

== Awards and nominations ==
Award	Category	Nominated work	Result	Ref.
23rd Shanghai Television Festival	Best Television Series	In the Name of the People	Nominated	
23rd Shanghai Television Festival	Best Director	Li Lu	Nominated	
23rd Shanghai Television Festival	Best Writing	Zhou Meisen	Nominated	
23rd Shanghai Television Festival	Best Supporting Actor	Wu Gang	Won	
23rd Shanghai Television Festival	Best Supporting Actor	Zhang Zhijian	Won	
23rd Shanghai Television Festival	Best Supporting Actress	Hu Jing	Nominated	
22nd Huading Awards	Jury Award	In the Name of the People	Won	
8th Macau International Television Festival	Best Television Series	In the Name of the People	Won	
8th Macau International Television Festival	Best Director	Li Lu	Nominated	
8th Macau International Television Festival	Best Writing	Zhou Meisen	Won	
8th Macau International Television Festival	Best Actor	Zhang Fengyi	Won	
8th Macau International Television Festival	Best Supporting Actor	Gao Yalin	Won	
