= Missing Pieces (2000 film) =

- Based on: Atticus by Ron Hansen
- Written by: Peachy Markowitz; Philip Rosenberg; Richard Kletter; D.W. Owen
- Directed by: Carl Schenkel
- Starring: James Coburn; Lisa Zane; Paul Kersey; William R. Moses
- Music by: Lawrence Shragge
- Country of origin: United States
- Original language: English

Production
- Executive producer: Richard Welsh
- Producer: Andrew Gottlieb
- Cinematography: Karl Herrmann
- Editor: Toni Morgan
- Running time: 96 minutes
- Production company: Hallmark Hall of Fame

Original release
- Network: CBS
- Release: February 6, 2000

Missing Pieces is a 2000 American made-for-television drama film starring James Coburn, Lisa Zane, Paul Kersey and William R. Moses.

== Plot ==
A father travels to Mexico to claim the body of his son who has just committed suicide under mysterious circumstances.

== Cast ==
- James Coburn as Atticus Cody
- Lisa Zane as Renata
- Paul Kersey as Scott Cody
- Finn Carter as Marilyn
- William R. Moses as David
- Julio Oscar Mechoso as Hernandez
- Maxwell Caulfield as Stuart
- Octavia Spencer as Elegant Guest
- Matthew Malone as Adam
- Nathan Malone as Adam
