= Liu Peiqi =

Chinese actor

- Born: 30 November 1957 (age 68); Beijing, China
- Education: People's Liberation Army Academy of Art
- Occupation: Actor
- Years active: 1985-present
- Awards: Hong Kong Film Awards – Not Specified in Hong Kong film Awards Golden Rooster Awards – Best Actor; 1997 The Days Without Lei Feng

Chinese name
- Traditional Chinese: 劉佩琦
- Simplified Chinese: 刘佩琦
Transcriptions
Standard Mandarin
- Hanyu Pinyin: Liú Pèi Qí
Yue: Cantonese
- Jyutping: Lau^{4} Pui^{3} Kei^{4}

Liu Peiqi (Chinese: 刘佩琦; born 30 November 1957) is a Chinese actor. He started his training in 1979 when he joined Military Art School. He joined Military Drama Group in Xinjiang Province in 1983. In 1985 he starred in his first movie, Father and Son, directed by Wang Bingling. After transferring to Beijing Military Drama Group, then the China National Drama Group, Liu starred in Days Without Leifeng, directed by Lei Xianhe. For his performance, he was awarded the Golden Rooster for Best Actor (China's version of the Academy Award). He was also awarded Best Performance in a Male Leading Role in the Outstanding Film Awards organized by the Chinese Ministry of Radio, Film and Television. Liu's recent credits include starring roles in Zhang Yimou's The Story of Qiu Ju, Zhou Xiaowen's Ermo and Chen Kaige's Together, for which he was awarded the San Sebastián International Film Festival Award for Best Actor, becoming the first Chinese actor ever to receive that award.

== Filmography ==
=== Films ===
Year	Title	Role	Notes
1992	The Story of Qiu Ju (秋菊打官司)	Wan Qinglai	
1994	Ermo (二嫫)		
1996	The Days Without Lei Feng (離開雷鋒的日子)	Qiao Anshan	Won—Shanghai Film Critics Award for Best Actor; Won—Golden Rooster Award for Best Actor
1998	Sima Dun		
1999	Stars in the Sky (朗朗星空)		
2000	Shadow Magic (西洋鏡)		
2002	Together (和你在一起)	Liu Cheng	Won—Best Actor, San Sebastián International Film Festival; Nominated—Golden Rooster Award for Best Actor
2002	Go Home (老少無猜)		
2002	The Girl Muran (少女穆然)		
2008	Gun of Mercy (5顆子彈)	Policeman Ma	Nominated—Golden Rooster Award for Best Actor
2011	The Founding of a Party (建黨偉業)	Gu Hongming	
2011	The Sun		
2012	The Tree in the Rain		
2013	The Story of Zhou Enlai		
2013	Police Story 2013		
2014	Coming Home		
2017	The Legend of the Cat Demon		
2019	For Love with You		
2019	Enter the Forbidden City		
2019	X Love		
2026	I Know Who You Are	Wang Liujin	

=== Television ===
Year	Title	Role	Notes
2001	The Grand Mansion Gate	Bai Yingyu	
2010	Justice Bao 1	Bao Mian	
2011	Secret History of Empress Wu	Shangguan Yi	
2012	The Legend of Chu Liuxiang	Shi Tianzhai	
2017	White Deer Plain		
2017	Nothing Gold Can Stay	Zhou Laosi	
2018	Eagles and Youngster		
2018	Ever Night	Chen Mou	
2023	Rising With the Wind	Ye Guoming	
