= Zhou Meisen =

Chinese novelist and scriptwriter

Zhou Meisen (Chinese: 周梅森; pinyin: Zhōu Méisēn; born 9 March 1956) is a contemporary Chinese novelist and scriptwriter. He is active in literary mainland China since the 1980s. He is well known for some of his works which have been adapted for screen, especially In the Name of the People.

Zhou was born on 9 March 1956, in Jiangsu. He grew up in Jiawang, a suburb of Xuzhou with plentiful coal capacity. Later, he went to a high school, as a part-time student, working for a local pit. He became a miner after he left school. Thus, Zhou's earlier writings focus on coal industry and miners. When he was 14 years old, he knew Balzac by chance. From then on, Zhou adores him and professes realism should be the guideline of own writing.

In the late 1970s, Zhou published his first work in Xinhua Daily. A year later, he was transferred to Nanjing, working as an editor for Youth, a recently started magazine. He gained initial fame with his 1983 novella The Sinking Land (Chinese: 沉沦的土地), then he became a professional writer since 1984. In the mid-1990s, he spent one year on secondment to a municipal government as deputy secretary general. In the meantime, he attempted to make a decent living by investing in business, stock and real estate. The broad experience inspired him, and suffuses in his works.

Zhou's novels and scripts of the anti-graft dramas are in the public gaze. To make the plot vivid, he even visited a jail and interviewed the detained officials for corruption.

As a major individual shareholder of some a listed company, Zhou published his open letters and called on individual investors against its reform of non-tradable shares to unite in 2005, since he claimed such a reform damages the interests of them. Eventually, the shareholders' meeting voted that down. The news caused a strong reaction among the individual investors, so he became the candidate for CCTV Person of the Year for Social Common Good (Chinese: 社会公益人物).

== Publications ==
- The Sinking Land
- Supreme Interest (Chinese: 至高利益)
- State Prosecution (Chinese: 国家公诉)
- In the Name of the People

== Works in translation (English) ==
- In the Name of the People
- Property of the People
