= Huabiao Award for Outstanding Writer =

Annual Chinese film award

The Huabiao Award for Outstanding Writer was first awarded in 1995.

== Winners & nominations ==
=== 2010s ===
Year	Number	Writer	Film
2011	14th	Xing Yuanping	The Old Village
2011	14th	Dong Zhe, Guo Junli, Huang Xin	The Founding of a Party
2011	14th	Zhang Meng	The Piano in a Factory
2011	14th	Liu Jianwei, Wang Qiang, Liu Hongwei; Zhao Junfang, Liang Shuibao	Accidental Legend

=== 2000s ===
Year	Number	Writer	Film
2009	13th	Su Xiaowei	Six Sisters in the War
2009	13th	Zhang Bing	The Great River
2009	13th	Li Benshen, Liu Wenya, Xiong Mingguo	Deng Pingshou
2009	13th	Gu Bai, Jiang Haiyang, Zong Fuxian	University Entrance Exam 1977
2007	12th	Liu Heng	The Knot
2007	12th	Lu Zhuguo	On the Mountain of Tai Hang
2007	12th	Yu Zhong	Shambhala Messenger
2007	12th	Hu Hanwen	Jiang Wu Classroom
2001	7th	He Zizhuang, Song Jigao	Final Decision
2001	7th	Hu Jianxin, Gu Baozi	To be With You Forever
2000	6th	Huang Dan	My 1919
2000	6th	Tang Louyi	Shadow Magic
2000	6th	Feng Xiaoning	Lover's Grief over the Yellow River
2000	6th	Sun Xiaoqing, Miu Lu	Female Coach & Male Player

=== 1990s ===
Year	Number	Writer	Film
1999	5th	Zhang Xiaotian	Century Dream
1999	5th	Zhang Ji, He Qingkui, Zhao Deping	The Women's Director
1998	4th	Liu Yibing	Bright Star Sky
1998	4th	Zhao Dongling	Passion to Defend
1997	3rd	Guo Zhongshu, He Guochen	Xi Lian
1997	3rd	Wang Xingdong	The Days Without Lei Feng
1996	2nd	Su Xiaoning	The Winner
1996	2nd	Zheng Yi, Shen Yiwei	Director of the Petition Offices
1995	1st	Bi Bicheng, Fan Yuan	The Accused Uncle Shang Gang
