= Lover's Grief over the Yellow River =

- Film poster
- Traditional Chinese: 黃河絕戀
- Simplified Chinese: 黄河绝恋
- Hanyu Pinyin: Húanghé júeliàn
- Directed by: Feng Xiaoning
- Written by: Feng Xiaoning
- Produced by: Jiang Ping
- Starring: Paul Kersey; Ning Jing
- Cinematography: Feng Xiaoning
- Edited by: Feng Sihai
- Music by: Ge Li
- Production company: Shanghai Film Studio
- Release date: October 1999
- Running time: 110 minutes
- Language: Mandarin

Lover's Grief over the Yellow River (simplified Chinese: 黄河绝恋; traditional Chinese: 黃河絕戀; pinyin: Húanghé júeliàn), also known as Heart of China, is a 1999 Chinese film directed by Feng Xiaoning. It was China's official Best Foreign Language Film submission at the 72nd Academy Awards, but did not receive a nomination. Feng considers it the second of his "War and Peace" (战争与和平) trilogy.

== Plot ==
The plot centers on an American pilot, played by Paul Kersey, who also starred in Feng Xiaoning's 1997 Red River Valley, a film which depicted the British invasion of Tibet in 1905. During the Second Sino-Japanese War the American pilot makes a forced landing near the Great Wall in North China but is taken into the care of the Communist guerilla forces. He meets and falls in love with a young woman fighter who had been raped by the Japanese invaders. The American returns to the Yellow River after the opening of China in the 1980s.

== See also ==
- List of submissions to the 72nd Academy Awards for Best Foreign Language Film
- List of Chinese submissions for the Academy Award for Best Foreign Language Film
