= Jianlin Cheng =

American computer scientist

Jianlin (Jack) Cheng is the William and Nancy Thompson Missouri Distinguished Professor in the Electrical Engineering and Computer Science (EECS) Department at the University of Missouri, Columbia. He earned his PhD from the University of California-Irvine in 2006, his MS degree from Utah State University in 2001, and his BS degree from Huazhong University of Science and Technology in 1994.

His research interests include bioinformatics, machine learning and artificial intelligence. His current research is focused on protein structure and function prediction, 3D genome structure modeling, biological network construction, and deep learning with applications to big data in biomedical domains.

Dr. Cheng has more than 180 publications in the field of bioinformatics, computational biology, artificial intelligence, and machine learning, which have been cited thousands of times according to Google Scholar Citations. He and his students developed one of the first deep learning methods for protein structure prediction and demonstrated that deep learning was the best method for protein structure prediction for the first time in the 10th community-wide Critical Assessment of Techniques for Protein Structure Prediction (CASP10) in 2012. His protein structure prediction methods (MULTICOM) supported by the National Institutes of Health (NIH) and the National Science Foundation (NSF) were consistently ranked among the top methods during the last several rounds of the community-wide Critical Assessment of Techniques for Protein Structure Prediction (CASP) from 2008 to 2022. Dr. Cheng was a recipient of 2012 NSF CAREER award for his work on 3D genome structure modeling. He is a fellow of American Institute for Medical and Biological Engineering (AIMBE) and a fellow of Asia-Pacific Artificial Intelligence Association (AAIA).

== Selected publications ==
- Chen, C., Chen, X., Morehead, A., Wu, T., Cheng, J. (2023) 3D-equivariant graph neural networks for protein model quality assessment. Bioinformatics, accepted.
- Guo, Z., Liu, J., Skolnick, J., Cheng, J. (2022) Prediction of inter-chain distance maps of protein complexes with 2D attention-based deep neural networks. Nature Communications. 13:6963.
- Liu, J., Wu, T., Guo, Z., Hou, J., & Cheng, J. (2022). Improving protein tertiary structure prediction by deep learning and distance prediction in CASP14. Proteins: Structure, Function, and Bioinformatics, 90(1), 58-72.
- Chen, C., Wu, T., Guo, Z., & Cheng, J. (2021). Combination of deep neural network with attention mechanism enhances the explainability of protein contact prediction. Proteins: Structure, Function, and Bioinformatics, 89(6), 697-707.
- Wu, T., Guo, Z., Hou, J., & Cheng, J. (2021). DeepDist: real-value inter-residue distance prediction with deep residual convolutional network. BMC bioinformatics, 22, 1-17.
- Hou, J., Wu, T., Cao, R., & Cheng, J. (2019). Protein tertiary structure modeling driven by deep learning and contact distance prediction in CASP13. Proteins: Structure, Function, and Bioinformatics, 87(12), 1165-1178.
- T. Trieu, J. Cheng. Large-scale reconstruction of 3D structures of human chromosomes from chromosomal contact data. Nucleic Acids Research. 42(7):e52, 2014.
- M. Zhu, J. Dahmen, G. Stacey, J. Cheng. Predicting gene regulatory networks of soybean nodulation from RNA-Seq transcriptome data. BMC Bioinformatics. 14:278, 2013.
- J. Eickholt, J. Cheng. A Study and Extension of DNcon: a Method for Protein Residue-Residue Contact Prediction Using Deep Networks. BMC Bioinformatics. 14(Suppl 14):S12, 2013.
- J. Eickholt, J. Cheng. Predicting Protein Residue-Residue Contacts Using Deep Networks and Boosting. Bioinformatics. 28(23):3066-3072, 2012.
