= Ye Tan =

Chinese economist and research professor

Ye Tan (Chinese: 叶坦; born 1956) is a Chinese economist and a research professor at the Institute of Economics of the Chinese Academy of Social Sciences since 1988. In 2012, she was appointed as an adjunct professor at Peking University School of Economics. She is a member of the NSFC peer councillor, member of the 19th-century Japanese Society for Economic and Social Studies, and vice president of the Chinese Association of historic Economic Thought. She is the director of the Academy of History of Chinese Economic Thought.

== Education and work ==
Ye was born in Beijing in 1956. She earned Bachelor of History in Hebei University (1982), Master of Arts in Wuhan University (1985), Ph.D. in economics in Chinese Academy of Social Sciences (1988). Since 1988, she has served as a researcher and a professor at the Institute of Economics of the Chinese Academy of Social Sciences.

She has served as a researcher at the Japan Society for the Promotion of Science, a researcher at the International Exchange Foundation, member of the Japan 19th Century Economic and Social Thought Research Association, and vice president of the Chinese Society of Economic Thought History. In 2012, she was awarded the title of Great Wall Scholar of the Chinese Academy of Social Sciences. In 2012, she was appointed as an adjunct professor at Peking University School of Economics.

== Research ==
Ye's research interests include the history of Chinese economic thoughts, the history of economic thoughts in the Song dynasty, the history of Chinese economic history, the history of economic categories, and the study of East Asian economic thoughts. The Chinese economic thought is an independent discipline of theoretical economics in China. It also has an interdisciplinary comprehensive nature, involving economics, philosophy, history, culture, society and other disciplines. It studies the development of China's economic thought since ancient times and today.

Her research steps are: based on the study of Chinese economic thought history and the innovation of subject basic theory, and then develop into the study of economic concepts, especially traditional economic concepts and modernization, and then through specific comparison of East Asian modernization models. The development of the economic concept of China and Japan and its influence on the modernization of the two countries are typical, and the history of China's economic thought itself is deepened and improved. She focused the studies about the combination between culture and economy and raised the new theory "Economiculturology".

Since 1989, she did the economic projects in partnership with Institute of Economics of the Chinese Academy of Social Sciences and other foreign academic institutes such as She is the director of the projects "Traditional Economic ideas and Modernization", "A comparative study of Economic Thought in China and Japan", "the studies of East Asian economic thoughts" and "Sustainable development plan for western China" etc.

== Scholarship ==
- A Study of the Chinese Formsbook published 1989
- The Debate Among Traditional Economic Concepts: A Comparison of Si Ma-guang and Wang An-shiPeking University Press, book published 1990
- Enriching Nation and People: A study of Song Economic Thoughtbook published in 1991
- Confucianism and Chinese economy book published in 2005
- Economic Development in Twentieth Century East Asia Routledge Press U.K. 1997
- "Features of the development of Industries and Commerce in Song period" Quarterly Bulletin of Shanghai Academy of Social Science, 1991
- "The Study of Shi Ye's Economic Thoughts" 1991
- "Comparison between China and Japan about modern economic thoughts"1994
- "A Study of Social Economic Thought and Modernization in East Asia" Shanxi Economic Publishing House, Beijing, 1994
- "Roots of Chinese Economy" Social Science, NO.4 1998
- "Shi Tianmei's Economic Thought and Confucianism" 1998
- "The Theory of Economic and Cultural Integration and the History of Economic Thought", Caijing Forum, No. 5, 1998
- "A Survey of the Academic History of China's Economy--An Analysis of the Origin and Development Advantages of the History of Chinese Economic Thoughts", "Chinese Economic History" Research, No. 4, 2003
- "The World Trend of Huizhou's Economic Culture--Wang Maoyin in Capital", printed by the People's University Newspapers and Periodicals, Economic History, 2005
- "The Development Characteristics and Motivation of National Culture--Also on Regional Economy and National Rejuvenation, Ideological Front No.5, 2000
- "Globalization, Nationality and New Development Concept--Based on the Theoretical Consideration of National Economics", Ethnic Studies, No. 4, 2005
- "The Sixth Modernization China Safety and the management of Risks" Asia Policy, 2009
- "Academic Innovation and the Development of Chinese Economic History——Taking the History of Chinese Economic Thought as the Center" 2010
- "Analysis of Ye Yi's Economic Thoughts" published in The research of Chinese economic history January 2011
- "Etymological Studies of CHINESE ECONOMICS", The History of Ancient Chinese Economic Thought, Routledge, 2013

== Awards ==
- 1992 "Controversy on Traditional Economic Views" won the second prize of the "First Youth Outstanding Achievement Award" of the Chinese Academy of Social Science
- 1995 "The Rich Country and the Rich People" won the first prize of the "Second Youth Outstanding Achievement Award" of the Chinese Academy of Social Sciences.
- 1999 "Song Liaoxia Jinyuan Culture" won the fourth "National Book Award"
- 1999 "China Economics" Roots" won the eighth "Sun Yefang Economic Science Award"
- 2012 awarded with"Chinese Academy of Social Sciences Great Wall Scholar" title
