= Ju Xue =

Chinese actress

- Born: 22 November 1968 (age 57); Beijing, China
- Occupation: actress
- Spouse: He Qun (m. 1991; div. 1996)
- Awards: Golden Rooster Awards – Best Supporting Actress; 1993 Farewell My Love

Chinese name
- Traditional Chinese: 剧雪
- Simplified Chinese: 剧雪
Transcriptions

Ju Xue (born 22 November 1968), is a Chinese actress.

== Selected filmography ==
=== Film ===
Year	Title	Role	Notes
1987	Father and Son	San Ya	
1993	Farewell My Love	Yang Yan	Golden Rooster Award for Best Supporting Actress
1994	Country Teachers	Zhang Yingzi	Damacus Film Fest Special Mention
1995	The strangers in Beijing	Xiu Zi	
2003	The Law of Romance	Wu Shun	
2004	Shimmering Season	Ji Hua	Huabiao Award for Outstanding Actress; Nominated - Changchun Film Festival Golden Deer Award for Best Actress

=== Television series ===
Year	Title	Role	Notes
2003	Family Tree	Sun Yuxin	Feitian Award for Outstanding Actress
2007	Founding Emperor of Ming Dynasty	Empress Ma	
2011	Teehouse	Zhang Xiuying	
