= Du Yulu =

Chinese actor (1941–2020)

- Born: January 1, 1941; Harbin, Heilongjiang, Manchukuo
- Died: February 21, 2020 (aged 79); Harbin, Heilongjiang, China
- Education: Harbin Arts Academy
- Occupation: Actor
- Years active: 1979–2012
- Spouse: Zhu Yongyu (m. 1962; died 2020)
- Children: 3

Chinese name
- Chinese: 杜雨露
Transcriptions

Du Yulu (Chinese: 杜雨露; pinyin: Dù Yǔlù; January 1, 1941 – February 21, 2020) was a Chinese actor best known for portraying historical figures in several films and television series.

== Biography ==
Du graduated from the Harbin Arts Academy. During the Cultural Revolution, Du worked as a manual labourer at a grain storage. His first major work was in the film Jianxi (奸细), released in 1978. In 1997, he portrayed Zhang Tingyu in the popular prime time historical television series Yongzheng Dynasty, vastly increasing his profile. In 2000, he acted as an elderly military officer in the television series Escaping encirclement (突出重围), and also portrayed the head of the household in the hit television series Da Zhai Men. In 2002, he appeared as a provincial party chief in Provincial Party Secretary (省委书记). In 2007, he portrayed Chiang Kai-shek in the series Red Sun (红日), and reprised this role in the historical drama The East is Red (东方红).

Du died of lung cancer in Harbin, Heilongjiang, on February 21, 2020.

== Personal life ==
Du was married to Zhu Yongyu (朱永珏), and they have a son named Du Gang (杜刚), who was coach to Chinese table tennis legend Kong Linghui.
