= Zhang Fengyi =

Chinese actor

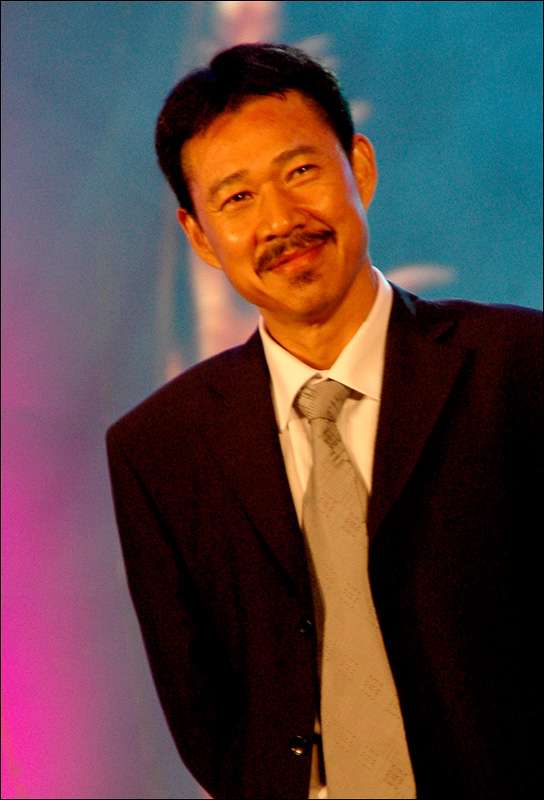
- Zhang in 2007
- Born: 1 September 1956 (age 70); Changsha, Hunan, China
- Occupation: Actor
- Years active: 1980–present
- Spouses: Lü Liping (m. 1988–1991) Huo Fan (m. 1994)
- Children: Zhang Boyu

Chinese name
- Traditional Chinese: 張豐毅
- Simplified Chinese: 张丰毅
Transcriptions
Standard Mandarin
- Hanyu Pinyin: Zhāng Fēngyì
Yue: Cantonese
- Jyutping: jeung1 fung1 ngai6

Zhang Fengyi (born 1 September 1956) is a Chinese actor best known for his role as "Duan Xiaolou" in Farewell My Concubine (1993), Jing Ke in The Emperor and the Assassin (1998), and Cao Cao in Red Cliff (2008–2009).

== Career ==
Zhang was born in Changsha, Hunan, while his ancestral home was in Tanghe, Henan. When he was merely one month old, he moved with his father to Dongchuan, Yunnan. He left high school in 1971 without completing his studies, and joined the opera troupe of a performing arts group in Dongchuan. He transferred to the singing and dancing team in 1973.

In 1978, Zhang was enrolled in the acting department of the Beijing Film Academy with excellent grades. In 1980, when he was a second year student, he was selected by Hong Kong's Phoenix Studio to play Xin Dalei in Treasure Hunting in Desert (1980), which was his film debut. A year later, Zhang portrayed Xiangzi in Rickshaw Boy, a film directed by Ling Zifeng and adapted from a story by Lao She.

Zhang portrayed Cao Cao in Red Cliff (2008–2009). He also played the protagonist in the film adaptation of White Deer Plain (2011).

In 2014, Zhang starred in the hit historical drama The Empress of China.

Among Zhang's notable projects in recent years is In the Name of the People, a political drama that is based on China's fight against corruption and on other political developments.

== Filmography ==
=== Film ===
Year	Title	Role	Notes
1980	Treasure Hunting in Desert 塞外夺宝	Xin Dalei	
1982	Rickshaw Boy 骆驼祥子	Xiangzi	
1982	My Memories of Old Beijing 城南旧事	Thief	
1983	Lu 路		
1984	Dare Devil Drivers 碰海人	Hailong	
1984	Mysterious Land 神奇的土地	Wang Zhigang	
1985	Yexing Huoche 夜行货车		
1986	Gezi Mi De Qiyu 鸽子迷的奇遇	Du An	
1986	E Nan 恶男		
1987	Jingdu Qiuxia 京都球侠		
1988	Huanghuo 荒火		
1988	Xuehun 血魂		
1989	Shangjie 商界		
1990	Fengyu Guitu 风雨归途		
1990	Heading South 南行记	Dahan	
1990	Dragon Year Cops 龙年警官	Fu Dong	
1991	No Regrets About Youth 青春无悔		
1991	Mandala 曼荼萝	Huiguo	
1993	Farewell My Concubine 霸王別姬	Duan Xiaolou	
1993	Temptation of a Monk 诱僧		
1993	The Assassin 杀人者唐斩		
1993	The Blue Kite 蓝风筝		
1993	Private Guard 私人保镖		
1994	The Great Conqueror's Concubine 西楚霸王	Liu Bang	
1994	Xin Baochou 新报仇		
1995	Zhenhanxing Chouwen 震撼性丑闻		
1995	Feihu Dui 飞虎队		
1995	Genwo Zou Yihui 跟我走一回		
1996	Pili Fenghuang 霹雳凤凰		
1996	Riguang Xiagu 日光峡谷		
1997	The Emperor and the Assassin 荆轲刺秦王	Jing Ke	
1997	Lie Xiong 猎凶		
1997	Dang'an X Sharenfan 档案X杀人犯		
2002	Jingtao Hailang 惊涛骇浪		
2006	Perfect Summer 完美夏天		
2008	Red Cliff 赤壁	Cao Cao	Nominated-Hong Kong Film Award for Best Supporting Actor; Nominated-Iron Elephant Film Awards for Best Actor
2009	Gaoyuan Ren 高原人		
2010	Sacrifice 赵氏孤儿	Gongsun Chujiu	
2011	White Deer Plain		
2012	In-Laws New Year		
2019	Nezha	Li Jing	

=== Television ===
Year	Title	Role	Notes/Ref.
1982	Yangzhou Baguai 扬州八怪	Qianlong Emperor	
1986	Zhu De 朱德	Cai E	
1991	Huaiyin Hou Han Xin 淮阴侯韩信	Han Xin	
1993	Zhong An Zu 重案组		
1996	Gu Wu Chunqiu 古吴春秋	King of Wu	
1996	Peaceful of Years 和平年代	Qin Zixiong	Won_Flying Apsaras Award for Outstanding Actor; Won_Golden Eagle Award for Best Actor (China)
1998	Fengyu Yishi Qing 风雨一世情	Xu Wei	
1998	Long Tang 龙堂	Du Zhong	
1999	Shengsi Liangzhouban 生死两周半		
2000	Jiayuan 家园	Han Haichao	
2000	Jianbing 兼并	Fu Chun	
2001	The Grand Mansion Gate 大宅门	Ji Zongbu	
2001	Qin Shi Huang 秦始皇	Qin Shi Huang	
2002	Shenian Jingguan 蛇年警官	Fu Dong	
2002	Wanmei Xiatian 完美夏天		
2002	Sky Lovers 天空下的缘分	Wu Hong	
2002	Tianjian Qunxia 天剑群侠	Qin Shi Huang	
2003	Longnian Dang'an 龙年档案	Luo Cheng	
2003	Mengduan Tianguo 梦断天国	Tang Nianzu	
2004	Lishi De Tiankong 历史的天空	Jiang Bida	Won_Flying Apsaras Award for Outstanding Actor
2005	Da Qing Fengyun 大清风云	Dorgon	
2005	Xi Shengdi 西圣地	Yang Dashui	Nominated_Flying Apsaras Award for Outstanding Actor
2006	Han Matou 旱码头	Yang Ruiqing	
2006	Zhongnian Jihua 中年计划	Jian Heping	
2007	Shangmen Nüxu 上门女婿	Ma Sibei	
2008	Jin Qu 禁区		
2009	Sun Zi Dazhuan 孙子大传	Sun Wu	Won_Flying Apsaras Award for Outstanding Contribution Award For 60 Years
2009	Banlu Xiongdi 半路兄弟	Cheng Rui	Won_Flying Apsaras Award for Outstanding Contribution Award For 60 Years
2015	The Empress of China 武媚娘傳奇	Li Shimin	
2017	In the Name of People 人民的名义	Sha Ruijin	Won-Macau International Television Festival for Best Actor
2018	Ruyi's Royal Love in the Palace 如懿傳	Yongzheng Emperor	Special appearance
2019	Novoland: Eagle Flag 九州·缥缈录	Ying Wuyi	Special appearance
2019	The Imperial Age 江山纪	Xu Da	
2020	Rights and Benefits 权与利		
2022	Who Rules The World 且试天下	Lord of Yongzhou	
2026	The Lament of Autumn 玉簟秋	Yu Zhongquan	
