= Guan Hu =

Chinese film director (born 1968)

- 管虎
- Born: 1 August 1968 (age 58); Beijing, China
- Occupation: Film director
- Years active: 1990s–present
- Spouse: Liang Jing (m. 2005)
- Awards: NETPAC Award: 2002 Eyes of a Beauty (Hawaii)

Guan Hu (Chinese: 管虎; pinyin: Guǎn Hǔ, born 1 August 1968) is a Chinese film director associated with the Sixth Generation movement. He is best known for directing the feature films Mr. Six (2015), The Eight Hundred (2020), and Black Dog (2024).

== Education and career ==
A graduate of the class of 1991 of the Beijing Film Academy, Guan became the youngest director in the Beijing Film Studio. In the 1990s, Guan directed a handful of films making a name as an important voice of the sixth generation, most notably with his debut, 1994's Dirt. A portrayal of Beijing's rock music scene, Dirt was filmed on a shoestring budget and was funded primarily by lead actress, Kong Lin. Dirt is often compared with another major sixth generation film about the Beijing rock scene, Zhang Yuan's Beijing Bastards. Unlike that film, Guan Hu paid nearly US$2000 for state studio affiliation, allowing the film to be distributed in China and screened abroad with approval from state regulators.

== Filmography ==
=== Film ===
Year	English Title	Chinese Title	Ref.
1994	Dirt	头发乱了	
1996	Cello in a Cab	浪漫街头	
1999	Farewell Our 1948	再见，我们的一九四八	Huabiao Awards—Best New Director
2002	Eyes of a Beauty	西施眼	Beijing College Student Film Festival—Most Popular Film
2009	Cow	斗牛	46th Golden Horse Film Awards—Best Adapted Screenplay
2012	Design of Death	杀生	
2013	The Chef, the Actor, the Scoundrel	厨子戏子痞子	Beijing College Student Film Festival—Best Director
2015	Mr. Six	老炮儿	China Film Director's Guild Awards—Best Director; 20th Huading Awards—Best Director; 31st Golden Rooster Awards—Best Writing
2016	Run for Love	奔爱	Segment: "Homeward Journey"
2019	My People, My Country	我和我的祖国	Segment: "The Eve"
2020	The Eight Hundred	八佰	
2020	The Sacrifice	金刚川	Anthology film
2024	Black Dog	狗阵	2024 Cannes Film Festival—Un Certain Regard Award
2025	Dongji Rescue	东极岛	

=== Television ===
- 2017: The Weasel Grave
