= Dirt (1994 film) =

- Official film poster
- Traditional Chinese: 頭發亂了
- Simplified Chinese: 头发乱了
- Hanyu Pinyin: Tóu fā luàn le
- Directed by: Guan Hu
- Written by: Guan Hu; Kong Lin
- Starring: Kong Lin; Geng Le; Zhang Xiaotong; Ding Jiali
- Cinematography: Yao Xiaofeng; Wu Qiao
- Edited by: Feng Sihai
- Music by: Guo Xiaohu
- Production company: Inner Mongolia Film Studio
- Release date: 1994
- Running time: 124 minutes
- Country: China
- Language: Mandarin

Dirt is a Chinese film from 1994 which depicts the nascent rock music scene of Beijing. It is considered an important example of the Sixth Generation movement that emerged in China after the Tiananmen Square protests of 1989.

While the film's general pessimism about youth is shared by many other Sixth Generation films, a character's choice to have a child rather than an abortion has been seen by some scholars to have played a role in why the film received official permission to screen abroad, in contrast to the similarly themed Beijing Bastards.

== Background ==
Dirt was filmed on a shoestring budget and was funded primarily by lead actress, Kong Lin. Dirt is often compared with another major sixth generation film about the Beijing rock scene, Zhang Yuan's Beijing Bastards. In contrast to that film's underground status, however, Guan Hu paid nearly US$2000 for state studio affiliation, allowing the film to be distributed in China and screened abroad with approval from state regulators.

== Plot ==
The film follows a nurse, Ye Tong (Kong Lin), who also serves as the film's narrator. One day, Ye Tong reunites with some childhood friends, including Peng Wei, a disillusioned and long-haired young man who leads a local rock band. Ye finds herself attracted to Peng Wei's lifestyle, despite the admonitions of her police officer friend, Zheng Weidong. When Zheng is injured by a mutual friend, Ye finds herself increasingly attracted to the strait-laced Zheng, while also finding herself attracted to Peng.

== Cast ==
- Kong Lin as Ye Tong, a nurse sent from her hospital in Guangzhou to train in Beijing.
- Geng Le as Peng Wei, a long-haired musician and childhood friend of Ye Tong.
- Zhang Xiaotong as Zheng Weidong, a strait-laced police officer who disapproves of Peng Wei's lifestyle.
- Ding Jiali as Zheng Weiping, Weidong's sister, Weiping works at a foreign company when she discovers that she is pregnant.
