= Tao Wei (footballer, born 1966) =

Chinese footballer

Tao Wei 陶伟
Personal information
- Full name: Tao Wei
- Date of birth: January 11, 1966
- Place of birth: Beijing, China
- Date of death: August 27, 2012 (aged 46)
- Place of death: Jinan, Shandong, China
- Height: 1.78 m (5 ft 10 in)
- Position: Midfielder

Senior career*
Years	Team	Apps	(Gls)
–1992	Beijing Guoan		
1992–1994	AS Dragon		
1994–1996	Sichuan Quanxing	3	(0)

International career
- China U20
- * Club domestic league appearances and goals

Tao Wei (simplified Chinese: 陶伟; traditional Chinese: 陶偉; pinyin: Táo Wěi; January 11, 1966 – August 27, 2012) was a Chinese professional footballer, who played as a midfielder, and commentator for CCTV sports channel.

== Career ==
Tao began playing professionally for home team Beijing Football Team and China national under-20 football team in the 1980s. He transferred to Tahiti Division Fédérale club AS Dragon in 1992. Tao joined Sichuan Quanxing in 1994, when the first season of Chinese professional football league Chinese Jia-A League began.

Tao retired from his playing career in 1996. In 1999, he launched a youth football club called Huijia Cheetah (汇佳猎豹). He went on to become active as a commentator, providing analysis to CCTV sports channel for Fußball-Bundesliga.

== Personal life ==
Tao married the Chinese actress Lü Liping in Los Angeles, on January 16, 1999. They divorced on August 2, 2001. He remarried in August 2011 and his son was born in March 2012, five months before his death.

== Death ==
Tao was found dead at a hotel in Jinan, Shandong province on August 27, 2012. After investigation, local police concluded that there was no evidence of homicide or suicide, the cause of death was sudden cardiac death.
