= Hu Xueyang =

Chinese film director, producer, writer and actor

- Born: 17 July 1963 (age 63); Heilongjiang, China
- Education: Beijing Film Academy
- Occupations: Film director, producer, screenwriter and actor
- Years active: 1993 – present

Chinese name
- Simplified Chinese: 胡 雪 杨
Transcriptions

Hu Xueyang
- Simplified Chinese: 胡雪杨
- Traditional Chinese: 胡雪楊
Transcriptions
Standard Mandarin
- Hanyu Pinyin: Hú Xuěyáng

Hu Xueyang (Chinese: 胡雪杨; born 17 July 1963) is a Chinese film director, producer, writer and actor. Born in a family of dramatists, he graduated from the Beijing Film Academy in 1989. He is a professor and a board member of the China Film Association. He is considered a member of the Chinese Sixth Generation filmmakers.

His brother Sherwood Hu is also a film director.

== Biography ==
Hu was born in July 1963 in Heilongjiang in Northeastern China into a family originally from Shanghai. His graduation work at the Beijing Film Academy, Memories of Childhood (1989), reflects on the protagonist's childhood during the Cultural Revolution.

== Film Director ==
=== 1990s ===
The film Those Left Behind (1991), screened about a Chinese wife whose husband has left for America. The film's realistic presentation of contemporary Chinese urban life and its subtle revelation of the inner world of the characters.

Hu's next film Drawing (1994), in which he himself played the male lead, portrays a young tennis instructor seduced by the beautiful wife of a rich businessman.

=== 2000s ===
From 2006, Hu wrote, directed and produced Shanghai 1976 (2006－2008), a Cultural Revolution romance that tells the tale of a forbidden love in Shanghai China in the turbulent year 1976. Four young people come of age and fall in love against the backdrop of political and historical events. Their heritage reflects Shanghai's cosmopolitan history. While the Cultural Revolution unravels around them, these four begin to dream new dreams to reach for freedom and to nurture hope for a brighter future. The film stars noted French actor Jean-Hugues Anglade, who starred in films such as Betty Blue, plays the role of a priest and father of the two girls in the film. Franco-Cypriot film La Croix (Crossroads), directed and written by Hu Xueyang was honored with the CYIFF Special Festival Award. At the 17th Bridges International Film Festival (Golden Pegasus Awards 2026) in Corinth the film La Croix (Crossroads) was honorary mention for Best Direction in the Feature Film and won the Best Screenplay in a Feature Film award.

== Filmography ==
Year	English title	Chinese title	Notes
1989	The Memory of Childhood	童年往事	
1991	The Left Behind	留守女士	
1993	Drawing	煙沒的青春	
1996	Evil	罪恶	
1997	My Green Card	綠卡族	
1998	Ice and Fire	冰与火	
2000	Love is Blue	愛情是藍色的	
2001	The Humanism in Europe (documentary)		
2001	White-collar Apartment	白領公寓	
2002	Exactly		
2002	The Retired Shooter		
2002	A Dream of Red Mansions		
2003	Half a Lifelong Romance	半生緣	
2004	The Hawthorn		
2004	Woman at the construction Site		
2005	Zhen & her Mistress		
2005	Sweet Noodles Restaurant		
2006	Shanghai 1976	上海1976	
2009	Lovely China	可愛的中國	
2010	The Secret Telegram Always There		
2011	Day and Night	黑白夜	
2011	Company of Scouts	先遣連	
2026	La Croix		
