= Kong Lin (actress) =

- 孔琳
- Born: Kong Linglin; 5 January 1969 (age 57); Hangzhou, Zhejiang, China
- Education: Beijing Film Academy
- Occupations: Actress, Producer, Singer
- Years active: 1989-present
- Awards: Sina Annual Fashion Boutique Artist Award 2009
- Musical career
- Also known as: 琳琳 (pīnyīn : Lín Lín)
- Instrument: Violoncello
- Label: Jinyingma Media

Chinese name
- Chinese: 孔琳
Transcriptions
Standard Mandarin
- Hanyu Pinyin: Kǒng Lín

Kong Lin (Chinese: 孔琳; born Kong Linglin (Chinese: 孔令琳); 5 January 1969) is a Chinese actress, television series and movie producer, art director, and semi-rock-pop singer. Born in Hangzhou, Zhejiang she now lives in Beijing, Jilin.

Kong is known as one of her generation's most distinguished graduates of the Beijing Film Academy, praised for her great ability and multitalented abilities. Before graduating, she was already contributing to several film projects directed by prominent filmmakers, such Zhang Yimou in his movie, Raise the Red Lantern.

Well known as a villain in many television series because of her performance in Raise the Red Lantern, she has appeared in The Proud Twins (2005), Zhen Qing Gao Bie (2003), The Raging Butterfly (2003), Lucky Zhu Bajie (2003) amongst many others.

== Early life ==
Kong Lin grew up in a family of artists; her father was in western-style opera/theatrical works as singer and actor. She is a 76th generation direct descendant of Confucius. She was mentored by her father in singing, dancing, acting, and also playing violoncello.

In 1987, Lin's father sent her to study acting at the Beijing Film Academy. During her teenage years, she often participated in opera/theatre performances and also took part in the school band when she was in high school, playing instruments (guitar, cello, or piano), singing, and dancing.

== Career ==
=== Movies ===
When Kong was still a student at the Beijing Film Academy, she began to make appearances in movies. In 1989, she was chosen by Li Shaohong, a famous mainland director, to take part in her movie named Bloody Morning. She starred as a poor village girl called Li Hong Xin. In 1991, she appeared in Zhang Yimou's acclaimed film, Raise the Red Lantern. Kong appeared alongside star Gong Li as her servant named Yan Er who acted haughty, stubborn, and full of hatred to her mistress. This role became one of her more notable roles. In the same year, Kong played as participant role in the movie Transcend Life as a Japanese girl, and Rippling Love as a pianist. In 1992, she had a female leading role in the semi-comedy film Cannot Live Without Love with some of her classmates.

After Kong graduated with her BFA degree in 1994, she produced a movie with some classmates, 頭髮亂了 (English Title: Dirt). Not only did she have a leading role in the film, Kong also served as producer of the film, directed by Guan Hu. In 1996, in Guan Hu's movie, Violoncello of the Street, Kong appeared again in a leading role, displaying one of her many talents by playing cello.

The most recent of Kong's film roles was in 2009, in the Wong Jing movie I Corrupt All Cops. She appeared as a special guest star, in the role of Tony Leung Ka-fai's character's wife.

=== Television series ===
As in her films, Kong has not only appeared as an actress in TV projects. She has also done some behind-the-scenes work for various productions. In 2001, she produced an adventure TV series named 一路上有你 (English Title: You and Me on the Road). In that television series, she was the lead actress, producer, script supervisor, and art director. She also showed her playing cello performance again in a few scenes. The series is set in Beijing, Shanghai, Malaysia, and Canada, with a diverse cast representing mainland China, Hong Kong, Taiwan, and Malaysia.

As a producer and script supervisor, Lin collaborated with her friends and other partners on a television series in 2003, 真情告别 Zhen Qing Gao Bie.

== Filmography ==
=== Television series ===
- Where the Mask Ends《嫁金钗》as Duchess Ying (2026)
- Ray Of Light as Li Ting (2023)
- My Story for You as Du Juan (2018)
- Tiger Mom《虎媽貓爸》 as Sister Wu《吳姐》(2015)
- True Man《爺們儿》 as Li Guoyue《李國月》(2014)
- May–December Love《大丈夫》 as Zhao Shuya《趙舒雅》(2014)
- Shei Jie Nu Ren Xin《誰解女人心》 as Meimei《梅美》(2013)
- Romance of Tang′ Dynasty《唐朝浪漫英雄》 as Nushushi《女術士》(the maker of black fire) (2013)
- Mom Gossip Circle《妈妈圈的流言蜚语》 as Xia Aiwu《夏爱武》(2012)
- Happy Marshal《欢乐元帅》as Yin Xiangyu《银香玉》/the owner diner (special appearance) (2012)
- Twins of Brothers《大唐雙龍傳之長生訣》 as Zhen Sao《貞嫂》(2011)
- Legend of Crazy Monk Season II story.9《活佛濟公 II》 as Tong Yu Xia《佟玉霞》(2011)
- Shengsi Qiao《生死桥》as Hong Lian《红莲》(2010)
- Sha Chun《傻春》as Zhao Sumian《赵素眠》(2010)
- Kungfu Master Huang Fei Hong《仁者黃飛鴻》 as Huang Fei Hong's stepmother《娥姨》(2008)
- Zhang Li Hong De Xian Dai Sheng Huo (张礼红的现代生活) as Sun Bo (2007)
- Red Powder as Zheng Min (2007)
- Return of the Condor Heroes as Huang Rong (CCTV, 2006)
- The Proud Twins as Princess Yaoyue (2005)
- Heroic Legend《萍蹤俠影》as Jiu Tian Long Nu《九天龍女》(2003)
- Lucky Zhu Bajie《福星高照猪八戒》 as Nianhua Queen《拈花王后》(2003)
- Zhen Qing Gao Bie《真情告别》(2003)
- The Raging Butterfly《憤怒的蝴蝶》(2003)

=== Movies ===
- Bloody Morning《血色清晨》as Li Hong Xin《李紅杏》(1989)
- Raise The Red Lantern《大紅燈籠高高掛》 as Yan Er《雁兒》(1991)
- Rippling Love《情海浪花》as Dai Xiao Yan《戴晓妍》(1991)
- Transcend Life《飛越人生》as Japanese girl (special appearance) (1991)
- Cannot Live Without Love《不能没有爱》as Li Xiao Lan《李曉蘭》(1992)
- Go Into Business《瀟灑一回》as Lily《麗麗》(1993)
- Dirt《頭髮亂了》 as Ye Tong《葉彤》(1994)
- Violoncello of the Street a.k.a. Romantic Street《浪漫街頭》as Ying Zi《英子》(1996)
- Women's Choice《女人們的選擇》as Xia Lan《夏蘭》(1996)
- Hua Jie Street《花街》as Suo Meizi《蓑妹子》(2000)
- You Hear My Heart《我的心唱給你聽》as Miss Fang《芳姐》(cameo) (2002)
- Let us Remember《讓我們記住》as Mrs.Zhao《趙妻》(2003)
- Yesterday《昨夜霓虹》as Shu Yi《舒宜》(2005)
- Those were the Days《随风而去》as Mei Niang《媚娘》(2005)
- Sabre Man《仁厨子》 or 《人厨子》as Shi Liu《石榴》(2008)
- I Corrupt All Cops 《金錢帝國》 as Lak's Wife《樂嫂》(special appearance) (2009)

== Theme Song Performances ==
- Hóng Fēngzhēng 紅風箏 Red Kite, Dirt 頭髮亂了 movie insert theme song (1994)
- Fèixū 廢墟 Ruins, Memorial Arch 牌坊 TV series ending theme song (1995)
- Wǒmen Dōu Liúguò Yǎnlèi 我們都流過眼淚 We all grieve, Violoncello of the Street 浪漫街頭 movie theme song (1996)
- Cuò 錯 Wrong, Zhang Li Hong De Xian Dai Sheng Huo 張禮紅的現代生活 TV series ending theme song (2007)
