= Chen Jin (actress) =

Chinese actress

- 陈瑾
- Born: May 4, 1964 (age 62); Jinan, Shandong, China
- Education: Shandong University of Arts
- Occupation: Actress
- Years active: 1992-present
- Parent: Chen Kemin (father)
- Relatives: Chen Zhun (brother)

Chinese name
- Traditional Chinese: 陳瑾
- Simplified Chinese: 陈瑾
Transcriptions
Standard Mandarin
- Hanyu Pinyin: Chén Jǐn

Chen Jin (Chinese: 陈瑾; born 4 May 1964) is a Chinese actress. Chen is noted for her roles as Wang Ruhui in the film Roaring Across the Horizon.

== Early life ==
Chen was born into a military family in Jinan, Shandong, the daughter of Chen Kemin (Chinese: 陈克民), a professor at PLA National Defence University. Her elder brother Chen Zhun (陈准) is a fashion photographer. Chen graduated from Shandong University of Arts in 1987, majoring in drama. After graduation, she was assigned to the People's Liberation Army Air Force Drama Group as an actress.

== Acting career ==
Chen's first film role was uncredited appearance in the film Woman Criminal (1992).

In 1997, Chen acted with Li Yapeng, Pan Yueming, and Jiang Chao in the television series Student Hero and won the Outstanding Actress Award at the Flying Apsaras Award.

For her role as Wang Ruhui in Roaring Across the Horizon, Chen won the Golden Rooster Award for Best Supporting Actress, Huabiao Award for Outstanding Actress, and Best Supporting Actress Award at the Changchun Film Festival.

In 2002, Chen earned her second Flying Apsaras Award for Outstanding Actress for her performance as Zhu Huiyun in My Sister-in-law.

Chen had a minor role as a middle-aged women in Ma Liwen's romantic comedy film Desires of the Heart (2006), which starred Vivian Wu, Ge You, and Fan Bingbing.

In 2003, Chen played the role of Lin Zihan in Grand Justice, for which she won the Favorite Actress Award at the Golden Eagle Awards.

In 2007, Chen had a cameo appearance in Zhang Yimou's Curse of the Golden Flower, a historical film starring Chow Yun-fat, Gong Li, and Jay Chou, a financial success that took in $78,568,977 at the box office worldwide.

In 2009, Chen starred with Xu Fan, Zhang Jingchu, Chen Daoming, and Li Chen in Huayi Brothers's production of Aftershock, directed by Feng Xiaogang.

In 2012, Chen starred in The Doctors, for which she received Favorite Actress Award nomination at the Golden Eagle Awards.

== Filmography ==
=== Film ===
Year	Title	Chinese Title	Role	Notes
1992	Woman Criminal	女犯、摇滚、黑山林	Female prisoner	
1997	Shanghai Bride	上海新娘	Shan Xiaojing	
1999	Roaring Across the Horizon	横空出世	Wang Ruhui	
2000		相依年年	Ai Wenjing	
2000		的哥的姐	Xiao Yan	
2000		公正的心	Ai Jing	
2000		欢舞	Headmistress	
2006	Desires of the Heart	桃花运	Middle-aged women	
2007	Lost and Found	我叫刘跃进	Qu Li	
2007	Curse of the Golden Flower	满城尽带黄金甲	Mrs. Jiang	
2009	Aftershock	唐山大地震	Dong Guilan	
2014		菊美多吉		
2014	Nezha	少女哪吒		
2015	Ballet in the Flames of War	战火中的芭蕾		
2017	Hold Your Hands	十八洞村	Sister Ma	
2018	17 Years and 364 Days			
2020	Back to the Wharf	风平浪静		

=== Television ===
Year	Title	Chinese Title	Role	Notes
1990		山不转水转	Bian'er	
1991		我们当过兵	Laopai	
1992	Tide Rises, Tide Falls	潮起潮落	Zhu Biyun	
1993		跨越冬天	Lei Zizhai	
1993	I Love My Family	我爱我家	Mrs. Liu	
1994		荣辱商界	Lu Meng	
1995		布尔什维克兄弟	He Wei	
1996		其实男人最辛苦	Bai Ling	
1996	Student Hero	校园先锋	Nan Fang	
1997	The Story of Hospital	医院里的故事	Tian Lili	
1998	My Sister-in-law	嫂子	Zhu Huiyun	
1998	Grand Justice	大法官	Lin Zihan	
1999		劲舞苍穹	Ye Xiaoliu	
2000		好女不愁嫁	Zhou Liping	
2000		月落长江	Xi Xiaorong	
2000		非常代价	Gong Yuzhuo	
2000	Eyes	眼睛	Mother	
2000		天良	Su Lan	
2001	Marriage 10 Years	结婚十年	Luo Haiping	
2001		花非花	Xiang Qing	
2001		致命的承诺	Lu Jing	
2002		非常公民	Li Shuxian	
2002	The Story of Criminal Police	刑警的故事	Xiao Yun	
2002	White Snow	雪白血红	Liu Lanlan	
2003	Winter	冬至	Dai Jia	
2003		生死十七天	Zhou Lin	
2003		我们的八十年代2：下海		
2004		对决	Wen Na	
2004		长空铸剑	Lin Muqing	
2005	Destiny	缘分	Xie Yuting	
2005	The Dutiful Son	孝子	Qiao Shuilan	
2005		不堪回首	Ding Lifang	
2005		与爱同生	Shen Ning	
2006	Live Good	好好过日子	Yu Jianping	
2006	How Can I Lose You	怎能失去你	He Linjuan	
2006		守候幸福	Ru Yun	
2006		命运配方	Qu Yang	
2007	Remarried Woman	再婚女人	Yi Xiangpeng	
2007		前妻回家	Han Qing	
2007	Zhang Lihong's Modern Life	张礼红的现代生活	Zhang Lihong	
2008	Husband and Wife	结发夫妻	Zheng Haiying	
2009	Mortgage Slave	房奴	Ding Jiayan	
2010		热巴情	Bai Zhen	
2010	The Doctors	医者仁心	Jiang Yidan	
2010		悲喜亲家	Liu Suzhen	
2010	Mother	永远的母亲	Lu Ming	
2011	My Father and Mother's Marriage	我父亲母亲的婚姻	Zhang Zheng	
2011	Xiao Baicai Evaluated	杨乃武与小白菜冤案	Yang Juzhen	
2013	Infiltration	渗透	Yu Xiuning	
2013		大地情深	Da Bao's mother	
2013	Story of Time	光阴的故事	Mother Han	
2014		血符	Hu Dajiao	
2018	The Story of Ming Lan	知否？知否？应是绿肥红瘦	Ning Ping	
2018	All Is Well	都挺好	Zhao Meilan	
2023	Three-Body	三体	Ye Wenjie	

=== Drama ===
Year	Title	Chinese Title	Role	Notes
1987	Love in Snow-topped Peaks	雪峰恋	Bing Diao	
1988		被吞没的女子	Zhen	
1989		远的云，近的云	Ye Hui	
1990	Silhouette	黑影	Shantian Yangzi	
1991	The Art of War	孙子兵法	Yi Luo	
1994		大漠魂	Jin Feng	
1995		军营文化特写		
1997		与单身女人共度除夕	Gu Pan	
1997		豪情盖天	Luo Qiuyun	
1998	Waiting for Godot	三姐妹———等待戈多	Ma Sha	
1999	Peace Dove	和平之翼	Qiao Daimei	
2008	Hamlet 1990	哈姆雷特1990	Ge Zute	

== Awards ==
Year	Work	Award	Result	Notes
1997	Student Hero	Chinese Television Flying Apsaras Award for Outstanding Actress	Won	
2000	Roaring Across the Horizon	Golden Rooster Award for Best Supporting Actress	Won	
2000	Roaring Across the Horizon	Changchun Film Festival - Best Supporting Actress	Won	
2000	Roaring Across the Horizon	Huabiao Award for Outstanding Actress	Won	
2002	My Sister-in-law	Chinese Television Flying Apsaras Award for Outstanding Actress	Won	
2003		Chinese Television Flying Apsaras Award for Outstanding Actress	Nominated	
2003	Grand Justice	Golden Eagle Award for Favorite Actress	Won	
2009		Sohu TV Drama Season Review - Favorite Actress	Nominated	
2010		Sohu Internet TV Festival - Best Actress	Nominated	
2011		Chinese Television Flying Apsaras Award for Outstanding Actress	Nominated	
2012	The Doctors	Golden Eagle Award for Favorite Actress	Nominated	
2018	Hold Your Hands	34th Hundred Flowers Awards - Best Actress	Won	
2018	Hold Your Hands	17th Huabiao Award for Outstanding Actress	Won	
2019	Hold Your Hands	17th Golden Phoenix Awards- Society Award	Won	
2019	Hold Your Hands	6th The Actors of China Award Ceremony - Best Actress (Ruby Category)	Won	
