= Ermo =

- French film poster
- Directed by: Zhou Xiaowen
- Written by: Xu Baoqi; Lang Yun
- Produced by: Chen Kunming; Jimmy Tan
- Starring: Ai Liya; Liu Peiqi
- Cinematography: Lu Gengxin
- Edited by: Zhong Furon
- Music by: Hang Yi; Zhou Xiaowen
- Production companies: Shanghai Film Studio; Ocean Film Co., Ltd. Ningxia Film Group
- Release dates: August 1994 (Canada); 12 May 1995 (U.S.); 23 June 1995 (UK)
- Running time: 98 minutes
- Country: China
- Language: Mandarin

Ermo (Chinese: 二嫫; pinyin: Èrmó) is a Chinese comedy-drama film, released in 1994 and directed by Zhou Xiaowen. It is essentially a satire on Western consumerism and its influence on Chinese culture.

It was adapted from a novella written by Xu Baoqi. Tan Ye and Yun Zhu, authors of Historical Dictionary of Chinese Cinema, wrote that Ermo "observes the new trends of capitalism and consumerism in rural China at the beginning of the reform era".

== Development ==
Zhou Xiaowen, the director, said that "In China, money was once a synonym for filth. Now money has become a god. But will [this god] be able to satisfy his people?"

== Plot ==
Ermo is a hardworking village woman in the northern province of Hebei, who makes twisty noodles and sells them to support her husband and child. When her neighbor buys a brand new television, she is consumed by dreams of owning one herself. Desperate to own the largest television in the village, she becomes obsessive in her desire to earn money, eventually leaving the village to work in town and selling her blood. Her efforts to earn enough money damages her health and her relationship with her family.

The film demonstrates new trends and changes the Chinese society during the reform era and the different attitudes between those who joined the capitalist race and those who remained behind. Ermo becomes a wise merchant (even if she only sells dry noodles) and a consumer full of aspirations, while her elder husband still drinks his Chinese medicine and sees himself as the former head of village, a role which was meaningful during the Mao era. While Ermo is becoming more and more attracted to Xiazi, her business-oriented neighbor, and the lifestyle he represents, her husband remains impotent, both physically and metaphorically. As the film progresses it is evident that the competent capitalist-minded characters also do not find satisfaction, though it is also clear that those who don't join the race are completely irrelevant in the modern society.

The film ends with Ermo purchasing the largest television in the district and bringing it back to the village, but shows how mentally and physically drained she is after all the work she has done.

== Filming ==
Public Secrets, Public Spaces: Cinema and Civility in China, wrote that the narrative's space in Ermo has a "sense of desperation and inevitability" because the film's narrative was "filmed in a series of claustrophobic places".

== Purpose ==
Felix Thompson, the author of "Journeying in the Third World", wrote that the film questions the concept of progress by juxtaposing individualism and collectivism.

The main thematical element of Ermo is consumer behavior.

== Characters ==
- Ermo (二嫫 Èrmó) - The main character, portrayed by Ai Liya (艾丽娅)
  - Jerome Silbergeld, author of China Into Film: Frames of Reference in Contemporary Chinese Cinema, wrote that "Ermo's unwitting desire is for freedom from poverty and rural isolation but her pursuit of modernity in a box, earned with her feet and her blood, enslaves her body and soul." Tony Rayns, author of "Review of Ermo", wrote that the film never "laughs at [Ermo's] expense" even though the naivety of Ermo is the basis of a lot of the film's humor.
- Ermo's husband or Village Chief (村长 Cūnzhǎng) - A former village chief, Ermo's husband moves the items bought with Ermo's money into another room of the house and advocates for the traditional Communist social values. Ultimately he cannot prevent Western values and the television from coming into his household. Ge Zhijun (戈治均) portrays him.
  - Jerome Silbergeld, author of China Into Film: Frames of Reference in Contemporary Chinese Cinema, wrote that the husband, contrasts with Ermo, who is sexually charged and young. Silbergeld wrote that he is "a signature for the displacement of the Maoist old guard in China's pursuit of economic 'progress' and its growing social inequalities."
- Blindman / Xiazi (瞎子 Xiāzi) - Ermo's neighbor and love interest. His name literally means "a blind person". Liu Peiqi portrays him.
- Blindman's wife - She becomes jealous of Ermo because she has a daughter and not a son. Once she receives a television she tries to use that against Ermo. She invites Tiger to watch TV with her family and mentions the idea that Xiu and Tiger will marry someday. This causes Ermo to try to buy her own TV to outdo Blindman's wife. Yigang Pan, author of Greater China in the Global Market, Volume 14, wrote that the wife's TV puts the wife "on equal footing" against Ermo. She is portrayed by Zhang Haiyan (张海燕).
- Tiger / Huzi (虎子 Huzǐ) is Ermo's son. Yan Zhenguo (阎振国) portrays him.
- Xiu / Xiuer (秀儿 Xiùér) - The daughter of Blindman and his wife and playmate of Tiger. She is younger than Tiger. She is portrayed by Yang Xiao (杨 霄).

== Reception ==
During the 1994 Locarno International Film Festival the film won the Swissair/Crossair Special Prize and the Prize of the Ecumenical Jury.

== Year-end lists ==
- Honorable mention – Glenn Lovell, San Jose Mercury News

== DVD release ==
The film has yet to be released onto DVD in the United States. It has, however, been released on VHS in the U.S.
