= Ning Jing =

Chinese actress and singer

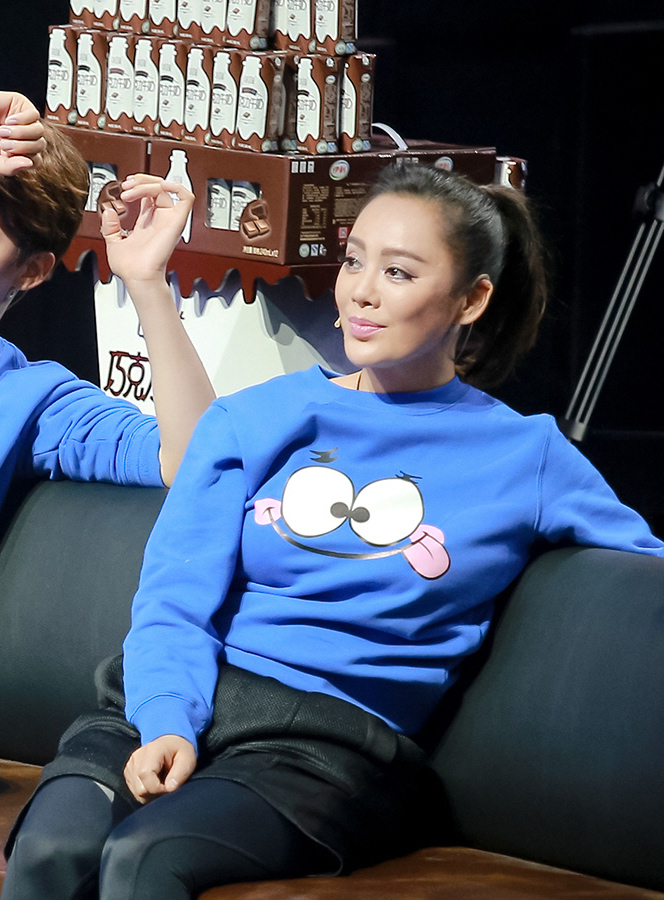
- Ning filming Ace vs. Ace in 2016
- Born: Guiyang, Guizhou, China
- Education: Shanghai Theatre Academy
- Occupation: Actress
- Years active: 1990 – present
- Spouse: Paul Kersey (m. 1997; div. 2011)
- Children: 1
- Awards: Golden Rooster Awards – Best Actress; 1999 Lover's Grief over the Yellow River Hundred Flowers Awards – Best Actress; 1997 Red River Valley; Best Supporting Actress; 2012 1911

Chinese name
- Traditional Chinese: 寧靜
- Simplified Chinese: 宁静
Transcriptions
Standard Mandarin
- Hanyu Pinyin: Níng Jìng

Ning Jing (Chinese: 宁静) is a Chinese actress and singer. She is best known for playing Mi Lan in In the Heat of the Sun (1994), Danzhu in Red River Valley (1997), Angel in Lover's Grief over the Yellow River (1999) and Empress Dowager Xiaozhuang in the television series Xiaozhuang Epic (2003). Ning has received various accolades, including a Silver Shell for Best Actress, a Golden Rooster Award out of two nominations, two Hundred Flowers Awards, and has been nominated for one Golden Horse Award.

== Early life ==
Ning Jing was born in Guiyang, Guizhou. Her mother is Nakhi, and her father is Han. She has a younger brother, Shun Wenqi, who is a rock musician.

== Personal life ==
In 1996, while shooting Red River Valley, Ning fell in love with Paul Kersey, an American actor who also starred in the film. They eventually married and had a child. In 2011, Ning stated that due to cultural differences, they divorced.

== Filmography ==
=== Film ===
Year	English title	Original title	Role	Notes
1991	Red Fists	联手警探	Lin Na	
1992	I'm Ugly but I'm Gentle	我很丑，但我很温柔	Liu Tingting	
1993	The Video Tape	偷拍的录像带	Laiyun	
1993	Red Firecracker, Green Firecracker	炮打双灯	Chunji	San Sebastián International Film Festival Silver Shell Award for Best Actress; Golden Phoenix Award for Society Award; Nominated – Golden Rooster Award for Best Actress
1994	Miss Morphis	奥菲斯小姐	Yi Meng	
1994	In the Heat of the Sun	阳光灿烂的日子	Milan	Nominated – Golden Horse Award for Best Actress
1995	The Winner	赢家	Lu Xiaoyang	
1995	Warrior Lan Ling	兰陵王	Yingying	
1996	Shanghai Grand	新上海滩	Fung Ching-ching	
1997	Red River Valley	红河谷	Danzhu	a.k.a. A Tale of the Sacred Mountain; Beijing College Student Film Festival Students' Choice Award for Favorite Actress; Hundred Flowers Award for Best Actress
1997	The Bewitching Braid	大辫子的诱惑	Ling	Beijing College Student Film Festival Best Actress; Shanghai Film Critics Award for Best Actress
1999	Lover's Grief over the Yellow River	黄河绝恋	Angel	a.k.a.: 1. The Legend of the Yellow River; 2. Grief Over the Yellow River; 3. Heart of China; Golden Rooster Award for Best Actress; Nominated – Changchun Film Festival Golden Deer Award for Best Actress
1999	Lotus Lantern	宝莲灯	Gamei	voice acting
1999	Wild Child's Secret			
1999	The Cotton Fleece	白棉花	Fang Biyu	
2002	Against The Torrent	惊涛骇浪	Han Mei	
2002	Manhole			
2002	Chinese Odyssey 2002	天下无双	Zixia	
2003	The Missing Gun	寻枪	Li Xiaomeng	
2005	Divergence	三岔口	Ting	
2005	Set To Kill	借兵	Ren Kangni	
2007	Call for Love	爱情呼叫转移	Pan Wenlin	
2009	The Founding of a Republic	建国大业	CPPCC member	
2011	1911	辛亥革命	Qiu Jin	Hundred Flowers Award for Best Supporting Actress
2012	Happy Hotel	乐翻天	Meng Jinghua	Nominated – Macau International Film Festival Golden Lotus Award for Best Actress
2014	Lady of the Dynasty	王朝的女人·杨贵妃	Consort Mei	
2017	Men's Secret			
2017	Wished	反转人生	Cameo	

=== Television ===
Year	English title	Original title	Role	Notes/Ref.
1999	Love in Shanghai	上海之恋	Bian Tinghua	
2001	Lü Buwei: Hero in Times of Disorder	乱世英雄吕不韦	Lady Zhao	
2001	The Grand Mansion Gate	大宅门	Zhen'er	
2001	Yingxiong	英雄	Tang Lan	
2002	Cao Cao Yu Cai Wenji	曹操与蔡文姬	Diaochan	
2002	Mengduan Zijincheng	梦断紫禁城	Qinglian	
2003	Da Qinchai Zhi Huangcheng Shenying	大钦差之皇城神鹰	Jin Fenghuang	
2003	Legendary Fighter: Yang's Heroine	杨门女将	Mu Guiying	Nominated – Lily Award for Favorite Actress
2003	Obeisance Moon Cabin	拜月亭	Ruilan	
2003	Xiaozhuang Mishi	孝庄秘史	Empress Dowager Xiaozhuang	Chunyan Award for Best Actress
2003	Baofeng Fating	暴风法庭	Su Jie	
2003	Dazhaimen	大宅门	Zhen'er	
2004	Huang Taizi Mishi	皇太子秘史	Princess Jianning	
2004	The Prince of Han Dynasty 2	大汉天子2	Empress Wei Zifu	
2004	Xin Wunü Baishou	新五女拜寿	Nuanbing	
2004	Wutong Xiangsi Yu	梧桐相思雨	Empress Dowager Longyu	
2004	Hunduan Loulan	魂断楼兰	Maya	
2004	Baiyin Gu	白银谷	Du Yunqing	
2004	Zhenxiang De Beihou	真相的背后	Xue Wenjun	
2004	Da Ma Bang	大马帮	Guoguo	
2004	Liuzhi Qinmo	六指琴魔	Wang Xuemei	
2004	Zuijian Enchou Lu	醉剑恩仇录	Ruan Hong	
2005	Yueshang Jiangnan Zhi Di Renjie Xiyuan Lu	月上江南之狄仁杰洗冤录	Bai Ruxue	
2005	The Romantic King of Dramas	风流戏王	Li Xiangjun	
2005	Langzi Yan Qing	浪子燕青	Lü Siniang	
2005	Devildom	魔界之龙珠	Fu Tianjiao	
2005	Ming Mo Fengyun	明末风云	Zhang Yan	
2005	Shaxiaozi Li Yuanba	傻小子李元霸	Xiao Meiniang	
2005	Ma Dashuai 2	马大帅2	Li Ping	
2005	Lost City in Snow Heaven	雪域迷城	Leng Yun	
2005	Trail of the Everlasting Hero	侠影仙踪	Empress Dowager Yu	
2005	Donggui Yingxiong Zhuan	东归英雄传	Yangjin	
2006	Shiquan Shimei Zhi Youmeng Niandai	十全十美之有梦年代	Langqin	
2006	The Lucky Stars	福禄寿三星报喜	Wangmu Niangniang	
2006	Ruan Lingyu	阮玲玉	Hudie	
2006	Gushang Zao Shi Qian	鼓上蚤时迁	Pan Qiaoyun	
2006	Hujia Hanyue	胡笳汉月	Empress Wenming	
2006	Royal Tramp	鹿鼎记	Chen Yuanyuan	
2006	Sela Qingchun	色拉青春	Duan Yuanyuan	
2006	King of Nanyue Kingdom	南越王	Princess Wuyang	
2008	Ai Jiu Ai Daodi	爱就爱到底	Yang Xi	
2008	Great Porcelain Merchant	大瓷商	Yin Xiuli	
2009	Zan Ba Zan Ma Liushi Nian	咱爸咱妈六十年	Bai Yulan	
2010	Da Guanjia	大管家	Wang Xiaoxi	
2010	Lady Shexiang	奢香夫人	Lady Shexiang	
2010	Hong Huai Hua	红槐花	Feng'er	
2012	The Qin Empire II: Alliance	大秦帝国之纵横	Mi Bazi (羋八子; Lady Mi)	
2017	The Qin Empire III	大秦帝國之崛起	Queen Dowager Xuan	
2019	The Legend of Haolan	皓镧传	Lady Li	

=== Reality show ===
Year	English title	Original title	Role	Note
2015	Up Idol	偶像来了	cast member	
2015	Divas Hit the Road	花儿与少年	cast member	
2020	Sisters Who Make Waves	乘风破浪的姐姐	cast member	
2020	Lady Land	姐姐的爱乐之程	cast member	
2021	Produce Camp 2021	创造营2021	cast member	

== Awards and nominations ==
Year	Award	Category	Nominated work	Result
1993	San Sebastián International Film Festival	Silver Shell for Best Actress	Red Firecracker, Green Firecracker	Won
1993	Golden Phoenix Award	Society Award	Red Firecracker, Green Firecracker	Won
1993	Golden Rooster Award	Best Actress	Red Firecracker, Green Firecracker	Nominated
1994	Golden Horse Film Festival and Awards	Best Leading Actress	In the Heat of the Sun	Nominated
1997	Beijing College Student Film Festival	Students' Choice Award for Favorite Actress	Red River Valley	Won
1997	Hundred Flowers Award	Best Actress	Red River Valley	Won
1997	Beijing College Student Film Festival	Best Actress	The Bewitching Braid	Won
1997	Shanghai Film Critics Awards	Best Actress	The Bewitching Braid	Won
1999	Golden Rooster Award	Best Actress	Lover's Grief over the Yellow River	Won
1999	Changchun Film Festival	Best Actress	Lover's Grief over the Yellow River	Nominated
2003	The Lilly Awards	Favorite Actress	Legendary Fighter: Yang's Heroine	Nominated
2003	Chunyan Awards	Best Actress	Xiaozhuang Mishi	Won
2012	Hundred Flowers Award	Best Supporting Actress	1911	Won
2012	Macau International Film Festival	Best Actress	Happy Hotel	Nominated
