= Red River Valley (1997 film) =

- Film poster
- Directed by: Feng Xiaoning
- Written by: Feng Xiaoning
- Based on: Bayonets to Lhasa; 1961 novel by Peter Fleming
- Produced by: Wu Zhuo
- Starring: Paul Kersey; Ning Jing
- Cinematography: Feng Feng; Feng Xiaoning; Gao Ziyi; Zhang Guoqing
- Edited by: Feng Sihai
- Music by: Jin Fuzai
- Production company: Shanghai Film Studio
- Release date: 21 December 1997
- Running time: 115 minutes
- Country: China
- Languages: Mandarin; English

Red River Valley (Chinese: 红河谷; pinyin: Hóng hégǔ) is a 1997 historical drama film directed by Feng Xiaoning about the British expedition to Tibet, starring Paul Kersey and Ning Jing. It was also released under the title A Tale of the Sacred Mountain. A book by Peter Fleming, Ian Fleming's brother, is credited in the movie. In 1961, Fleming published Bayonets to Lhasa: The First Full Account of the British Invasion of Tibet in 1904.

The film won numerous prizes at China's three main award ceremonies: Huabiao, Golden Rooster and Hundred Flowers.

The film's production was part of an official Chinese government effort - also reflected in the national curriculum - to incorporate the expedition to Tibet into the story of the century of humiliation narrative that China suffered at the hands of Western and Japanese invaders and commercial interests. Red River Valley was met with a lukewarm reception from audiences and was largely disregarded by the Western academic community, which perceived the film as being "biased toward promoting the Chinese government's policies".

== Plot ==
In 1900, a young Han Chinese woman named Xue'er (Ying Zhen) narrowly escapes being sacrificed to a river god during a severe drought. She flees into Tibet, where she is rescued by Gesang (Shao Bing), a Tibetan herdsman, and his elderly mother, who give her the Tibetan name "Xue'er Dawa". The two fall in love and begin a new life in a peaceful Tibetan village.

Their lives become intertwined with a British expedition led by the ruthless Colonel Rockman (Nicholas Love) and the more idealistic explorer Jones (Paul Kersey). After being caught in an avalanche, Rockman and Jones are rescued by Gesang, who saves them from execution by the local chieftain. While Rockman leaves to report on the region, Jones stays behind in the village to recover. During his stay, he is captivated by Tibet's culture and develops romantic feelings for Danzhu (Ning Jing), the chieftain's beautiful and proud daughter. However, she only has eyes for Gesang, creating an unrequited love triangle.

The fragile peace is shattered when Rockman returns, not as an explorer, but as the leader of a heavily armed British invasion force. Dismissing Tibetan sovereignty, he reveals his true purpose: to conquer the land for the British Empire. The village's pastoral tranquility gives way to brutal warfare as the British troops massacre thousands of Tibetan defenders. The chieftain dies trying to stop the onslaught, and Danzhu is killed, but not before she defiantly sings a Tibetan folk song in the face of her captors, refusing to be broken. During the final, devastating battle, Xue'er, having found a new homeland, makes the ultimate sacrifice to fight alongside Gesang. They die together as the village is destroyed.

The film concludes with a traumatized Jones wandering alone through the corpse-strewn valley. He encounters Gaga, a young Tibetan boy who had been his friend, and breaks down, realizing the magnitude of the destruction wrought by his country. The film ends with Jones's voiceover lament: "These people will never give up, never disappear. And the land behind them is the Orient we will never conquer."

== Cast ==
- Jing Ning as Danzhu
- Bing Shao as Gesang
- Zhen Ying as Xue'er Dawa (Hong Xue'er)
- Paul Kersey as Jones
- Nicholas Love as Colonel Rockman
- Duobuji as Tribal Chief
- Rensang Quzhen as Ama (Mother)
- Quji as Gaga
- Zhang Jingsheng as Hong Zhi (Xue'er's Brother)
- Luodan as Daipen (Tibetan Army Commander)
- Zhang Guoqing as Housekeeper

Although the film is set against the backdrop of Tibet, the lead roles are all portrayed by Han Chinese actors; the Tibetan soldiers are played by Han Chinese members of the People's Liberation Army.

== Reception ==
Although the Chinese public generally regarded the film as highly realistic—and not merely a propaganda piece—Professor John Powers described the movie as containing several implausible elements. For instance, at the beginning of the film, Xier Dawa falls into the Yellow River; it would be physically impossible for her to travel upstream against the current and subsequently be rescued by Gesang on the banks of the Yarlung Tsangpo River in Tibet. Furthermore, it is highly unlikely that the Tibetan army would be led by a Han Chinese officer (a Dapon). Since Gyantse County is located in "Front Tibet"—the region furthest removed from China—and the area had been closed to all outsiders (including Han Chinese) for several decades at the time, the presence of any Han Chinese individuals in the locality would have been impossible. Moreover, as the majority of Tibetans at that time were unaware of China's territorial claims over Tibet, it defies logic to depict a Han Chinese individual leading the Tibetan army.

Tibetologist Robert Barnett stated that the film deviates most significantly from historical fact in its depiction of the British forces being defeated by the Tibetan army (in reality, the British were never defeated during the Younghusband Expedition) and in its portrayal of the Tibetan forces inflicting heavy casualties upon the British (Younghusband's official report cited a figure of 40 casualties). Barnett argues that the film's primary ideological thrust is that of a "patriotic, anti-imperialist struggle"; however—much like the film's serfs—it incorporates scenes informed by class analysis. For instance, one scene depicts Danzhu and a chieftain riding their horses through a crowd of kneeling serfs; in reality, Tibetans only kneel before lamas, and do not kneel to show respect to laypeople. The film also portrays Tibetans as ignorant and backward; for example, one scene shows Tibetans kneeling in worship rather than fleeing upon witnessing an avalanche. The film's climax features Danzhu singing aloud just before his death, with his fellow warriors singing in response; however, the actual Tibetan lyrics are, in fact, a song mocking a woman as being promiscuous.
