= Feng Xiaoning =

Chinese film director

- Born: 1954 (age 71–72); Xi'an, China
- Occupations: director, cinematographer, writer

Chinese name
- Traditional Chinese: 馮小寧
- Simplified Chinese: 冯小宁
Transcriptions

Feng Xiaoning (simplified Chinese: 冯小宁; traditional Chinese: 馮小寧; pinyin: Féng Xiǎoníng; born 1954) is a Chinese film director, screenwriter and cinematographer. He is considered a member of the "Fifth Generation" Chinese directors who graduated from the Beijing Film Academy in 1982. Feng however graduated from the Art Direction class.

He is currently also a member of Chinese National Political Consultative Conference and Chinese Writers' Association.

Feng was born in Xi'an to a family of teachers. He is most famous for his self-dubbed "War and Peace" (战争与和平) trilogy in film – Red River Valley (1997), Lovers' Grief over the Yellow River (1999) and Purple Sunset (2001).
