= Ai Liya =

Chinese film and television actress

- 艾丽娅
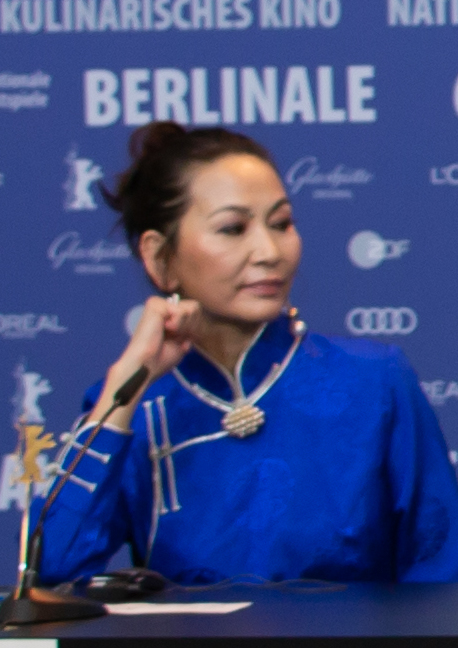
- Ai Liya, in 2019
- Born: 1 December 1965 (age 60); Inner Mongolia, China
- Years active: 1986–present
- Awards: Huabiao Awards – Outstanding Actress; 1995 Ermo Golden Rooster Awards – Best Actress; 1995 Ermo

Ai Liya (Chinese: 艾丽娅; born 1 December 1965 in Inner Mongolia) is a Chinese film and television actress. She graduated from the Acting Department of Beijing Film Academy in 1985.

== Filmography ==
Year	Title	Director	Role	Notes
1990	The Sun on the Roof of the World 世界屋脊的太阳	Xie Fei/Wang Ping	Buddhist nun	
1992	Black Mountain 黑山路	Zhou Xiaowen	Young woman	
1994	Ermo 二嫫	Zhou Xiaowen	Ermo	Golden Phoenix Award Society Award; Golden Rooster Award for Best Actress; Huabiao Award for Outstanding Actress; Shanghai Film Critics Award for Best Actress
1998	Genghis Khan 一代天骄成吉思汗	Sai Fu/Mai Lisi	Heelun	Beijing College Student Film Festival Jury Award for Best Actress; Changchun Film Festival Golden Deer Award for Best Actress; Golden Phoenix Award Society Award; Shanghai International Film Festival Golden Goblet Award for Best Actress; Nominated - Golden Rooster Award for Best Actress
2004	A Unique Schooling 上学路上	Fang Gangliang	Wang Yan's mom	Nominated - Golden Rooster Award for Best Supporting Actress
2005	Ballet of Two Dancers 两个人的芭蕾	Chen Li	Jin Mei	
2006	Mongol 蒙古王	Sergey Bodrov	Oelun	
2011	Yang Shan Zhou 杨善洲	Dong Ling	Yang Jingju	
2015	A Simple Goodbye 告別	Degena		Nominated - Golden Rooster Award for Best Supporting Actress
2016	The Song of Cotton 盛先生的花儿	Zhu Yuancheng	Sheng Qin	Shanghai International Film Festival China Movie Channel Media Award for Best Supporting Actress
2018	Ever Night 将夜	Qu Ni	Yang Yang	
2019	So Long, My Son 地久天长	Wang Xiaoshuai	Li Haiyan	

== Awards and nominations ==
Year	Award	Category	Project	Result	Ref.
1995	Golden Rooster Awards	Best Actress	Ermo	Won	
1998	Golden Rooster Awards	Best Actress	Genghis Khan	Nominated	
2004	Golden Rooster Awards	Best Supporting Actress	A Unique Schooling	Nominated	
2017	Golden Rooster Awards	Best Supporting Actress	A Simple Goodbye	Nominated	
1995	Huabiao Awards	Best Actress	Ermo	Won	
1999	Shanghai International Film Festival	Best Actress	Genghis Khan	Won	
2016	China Movie Channel Media Awards	Best Supporting Actress	The Song of Cotton	Won	
1995	Shanghai Film Critics Awards	Best Actress	Ermo	Won	
1998	Beijing College Student Film Festival	Best Actress	Genghis Khan	Won	
1998	Changchun Film Festival	Best Actress	Genghis Khan	Won	
1994	Golden Phoenix Awards	Society Award	Ermo	Won	
1998	Golden Phoenix Awards	Society Award	Genghis Khan	Won	
