= The Accused Uncle Shangang =

- Film poster
- Traditional Chinese: 被告山杠爺
- Simplified Chinese: 被告山杠爷
- Literal meaning: father Shangang the defendant
- Hanyu Pinyin: bèigào Shāngāng yé
- Jyutping: pei5 gou3 saan1 gong1 je4
- Directed by: Fan Yuan
- Written by: Fan Yuan; Bi Bicheng
- Starring: Meng Li; Li Rentang; Hua Yang
- Production company: Emei Film Studio
- Release date: 1994
- Running time: 104 minutes
- Country: China
- Language: Mandarin

The Accused Uncle Shangang (Chinese: 被告山杠爺) is a 1994 Chinese film about life in rural China. It won three of the 1995 Golden Rooster Awards, for Best Picture, Best Directorial Debut (Fan Yuan), and Best Actor (Li Rentang). It also won Best Picture and Best Actor at the 1995 Hundred Flowers Awards.

== Plot summary ==
Village Chief Shangang is not a bad man, but he often metes out justice as he sees it without regard to the law. To punish a woman accused of beating and otherwise abusing her old mother-in-law, Shangang has her bound and exhibited in the village in humiliating fashion, after which the woman hangs herself in front of his door. Her husband threatens to report Shangang to higher authorities, and eventually prosecutors Su Qiang and Xiao Ding come to investigate after being tipped off by an anonymous letter. They find that they have to take Shangang away for his illegal treatment of the woman, and when the villagers complain, Shangang himself tells them to accept the law uncomplainingly. At the end of the film, the audience finally learns the identity of the anonymous whistle blower.
