= Zhou Xiaowen =

Chinese filmmaker (born 1954)

- Born: 1954 (age 71–72); Beijing
- Occupation: Film director

Chinese name
- Traditional Chinese: 周曉文
- Simplified Chinese: 周晓文
Transcriptions
Standard Mandarin
- Hanyu Pinyin: Zhōu Xiǎowén

Zhou Xiaowen (simplified Chinese: 周晓文; traditional Chinese: 周曉文; pinyin: Zhōu Xiǎowén; born 1954 in Beijing) is a Chinese filmmaker. He graduated from the Cinematography Department of the Beijing Film Academy in 1975 and is part of the so-called Fifth Generation of Chinese filmmakers.

Zhou's thrillers received commercial success. Due to government censorship several of his films were prevented from being released. Very few people outside China knew about Zhou before the 1994 release of Ermo.

== Selected filmography ==
Year	English Title	Chinese Title	Notes
1987	Desperation	最后的疯狂	Co-directed with Shi Chengfeng; also known as The Last Frenzy
1987	In Their Prime	他们正年轻	Co-directed with Guo Fangfang
1987	Obsession	疯狂的代价	Also known as The Price of Frenzy
1991	No Regrets About Youth	青春无悔	Also known as No Regrets
1992	The Impulse of Youth	青春冲动	
1993	The Lie Detector	测谎器	
1993	The Trail	大路	
1994	The Black Mountain	黑山路	
1994	Ermo	二嫫	
1996	The Emperor's Shadow	秦颂	
1998	The Common People		
