= List of awards and nominations received by Chen Kun =

This is a list of awards and nominations received by Chinese actor and singer Chen Kun.

== Film ==
=== Asian Film Awards ===
Year	Award	Category	Nominated work	Result	Ref.
2012	6th	Best Actor	Flying Swords of Dragon Gate	Nominated	

=== Beijing College Student Film Festival ===
Year	Award	Category	Nominated work	Result	Ref.
2004	11th	Favorite Actor	Baober in Love	Won	
2007	14th	Favorite Actor	The Knot	Won	
2012	19th	Best Actor	Flying Swords of Dragon Gate	Nominated	
2012	19th	Favorite Actor	Qian Xuesen	Nominated	

=== Changchun Film Festival ===
Year	Award	Category	Nominated work	Result	Ref.
2012	11th	Best Actor	Qian Xuesen	Nominated	

=== Festival International du Film de Femmes de Salé ===
Year	Award	Category	Nominated work	Result	Ref.
2013	7th	Best Actor	Bends	Won	

=== Golden Horse Film Festival and Awards ===
Year	Award	Category	Nominated work	Result	Ref.
2005	42nd	Best Leading Actor	A West Lake Moment	Nominated	

=== Golden Rooster Awards ===
Year	Award	Category	Nominated work	Result	Ref.
2007	26th	Best Actor	The Knot	Nominated	

=== Golden Phoenix Awards ===
Year	Award	Category	Nominated work	Result	Ref.
2007	11th	Special Jury Award	The Knot	Won	

=== Hong Kong Film Critics Society Award ===
Year	Award	Category	Nominated work	Result	Ref.
2012	18th	Best Actor	The Flying Swords of Dragon Gate	Nominated	

=== Huabiao Awards ===
Year	Award	Category	Nominated work	Result	Ref.
2007	12th	Outstanding Actor	The Knot	Won	

=== Huading Awards ===
Year	Award	Category	Nominated work	Result	Ref.
2012	3rd	Best Actor	The Founding of a Republic	Won	
2018	24th	Best Actor	The Rise of Phoenixes	Nominated	

=== Hundred Flowers Awards ===
Year	Award	Category	Nominated work	Result	Ref.
2008	29th	Best Actor	The Knot	Nominated	
2010	30th	Best Actor	Painted Skin	Won	
2012	31st	Best Actor	The Flying Swords of Dragon Gate	Nominated	

=== International Chinese Film Festival ===
Year	Award	Category	Nominated work	Result	Ref.
2016	7th	Best Actor	Chongqing Hot Pot	Won	

=== Shanghai Film Critics Awards ===
Year	Award	Category	Nominated work	Result	Ref.
2006	15th	Best Actor	The Knot	Won	
2012	21st	Best Actor	Qian Xuesen	Won	

=== Shanghai International Film Festival ===
Year	Award	Category	Nominated work	Result	Ref.
2005	9th	Best Actor	The Music Box	Nominated	
2006	10th	Best Actor	The Knot	Nominated	
2006	10th	Most Popular Asian Actor	The Knot	Won	
2011	14th	Best Actor	Rest on Your Shoulder	Nominated	

=== University Students' Film Festival ===
Year	Award	Category	Nominated work	Result	Ref.
2007	2nd	Most Popular Actor	The Door	Won	

== Television ==
=== China Television Arts Festival for "Top Ten Best" ===
Year	Award	Category	Nominated work	Result	Ref.
2003	3rd	Best Actor	The Story of a Noble Family	Won	

=== Chunyan Awards ===
Year	Award	Category	Nominated work	Result	Ref.
2003	14th	Best Actor	Farewell Vancouver	Won	

=== Shanghai Television Festival ===
Year	Award	Category	Nominated work	Result	Ref.
2019	25th	Best Actor	The Rise of Phoenixes	Nominated	

== Music ==
=== CCTV-MTV Music Awards ===
Year	Award	Category	Nominated work	Result	Ref.
2005	7th	New Singer with the Most Potential	Osmosis	Won	
2007	9th	Most Popular Male Singer	Make It Come True Again	Won	
2010	12th	Best Male Singer	Mystery & Me	Nominated	

=== Channel[V] China Music Awards ===
Year	Award	Category	Nominated work	Result	Ref.
2005	11th	Best New Singer	Osmosis	Won	
2007	12th	Most Popular Male Singer	Make It Come True Again	Won	
2010	16th	Best Crossover Male Singer	Mystery&Me	Won	

=== China Music Chart Awards ===
Year	Award	Category	Nominated work	Result	Ref.
2005	12th	Best Newcomer		Won	
2007	13th	Most Popular Singer (Mainland)		Won	

=== ERC Chinese Top Ten Awards ===
Year	Award	Category	Nominated work	Result	Ref.
2005	12th	Top Ten Golden Melody	Spark of the Fireworks (烟花火)	Won	
2005	12th	Best New Singer	Osmosis	Gold Prize	
2010	17th	Best All Round Artist		Won	
2010	17th	Top Ten Golden Melody	Tortured by the Rose (蔷薇刑)	Won	

=== MusicRadio China Top Chart Awards ===
Year	Award	Category	Nominated work	Result	Ref.
2005	3rd	Top Ten Golden Melody	Spark of the Fireworks (烟花火)	Won	
2005	3rd	Best New Singer	Spark of the Fireworks (烟花火)	Won	
2007	5th	Most Popular Singer (Mainland)	—N/a	Won	

=== Sprite China Original Music Chart Awards ===
Year	Award	Category	Nominated work	Result	Ref.
2010		Best Singer, Mainland	Tortured by the Rose (蔷薇刑)	Won	
2010		Most Recommended by the Media	Tortured by the Rose (蔷薇刑)	Won	
2010		Most Popular Ringtone	Tortured by the Rose (蔷薇刑)	Won	

=== Top Chinese Music Awards ===
Year	Award	Category	Nominated work	Result	Ref.
2005	5th	Top Ten Golden Melody	Spark of the Fireworks (烟花火)	Won	
2006	6th	Most Popular Male Singer (Mainland)	Make It Come True Again	Won	
