= Haining =

Haining 海宁市
- County-level city
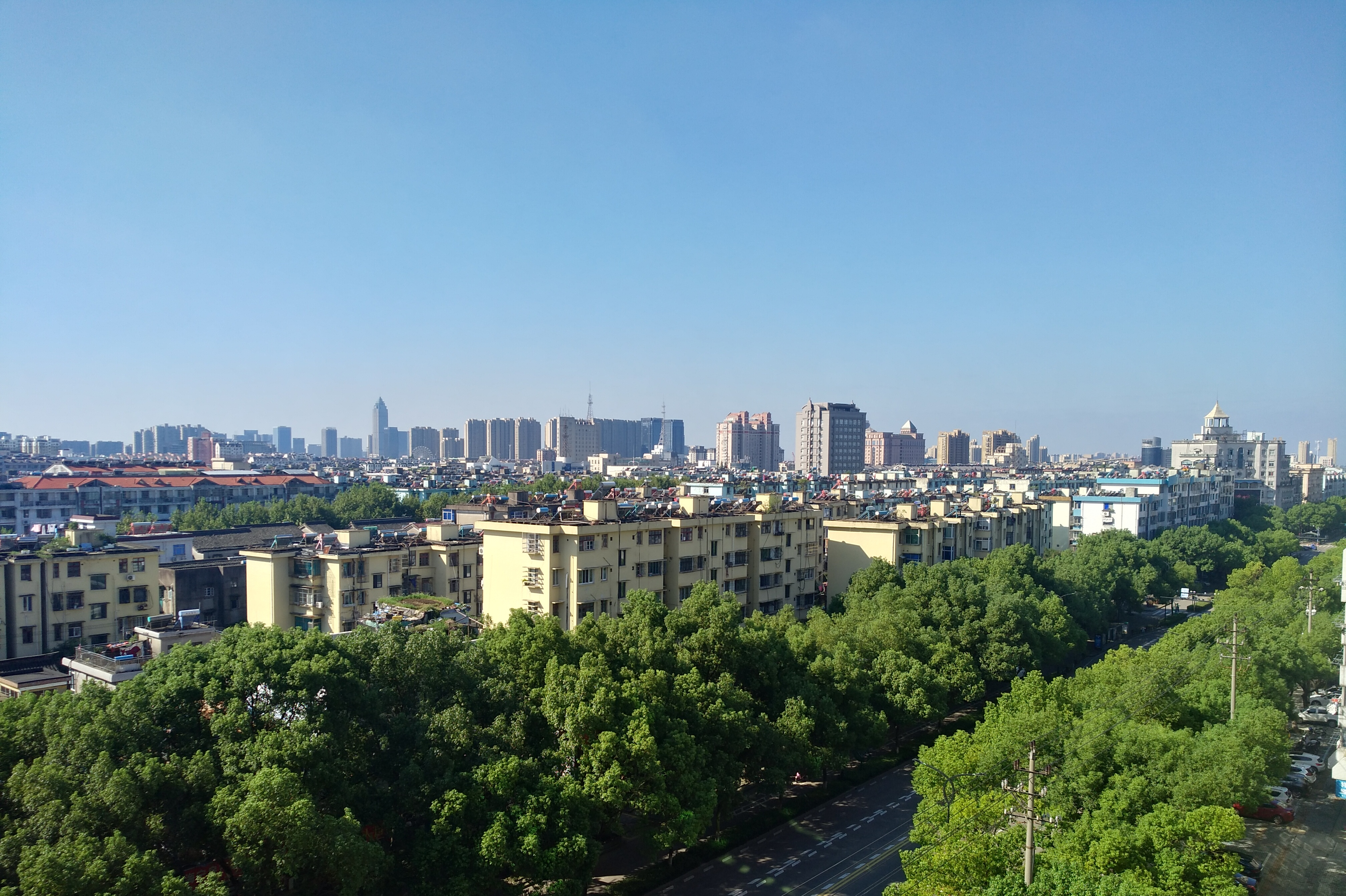

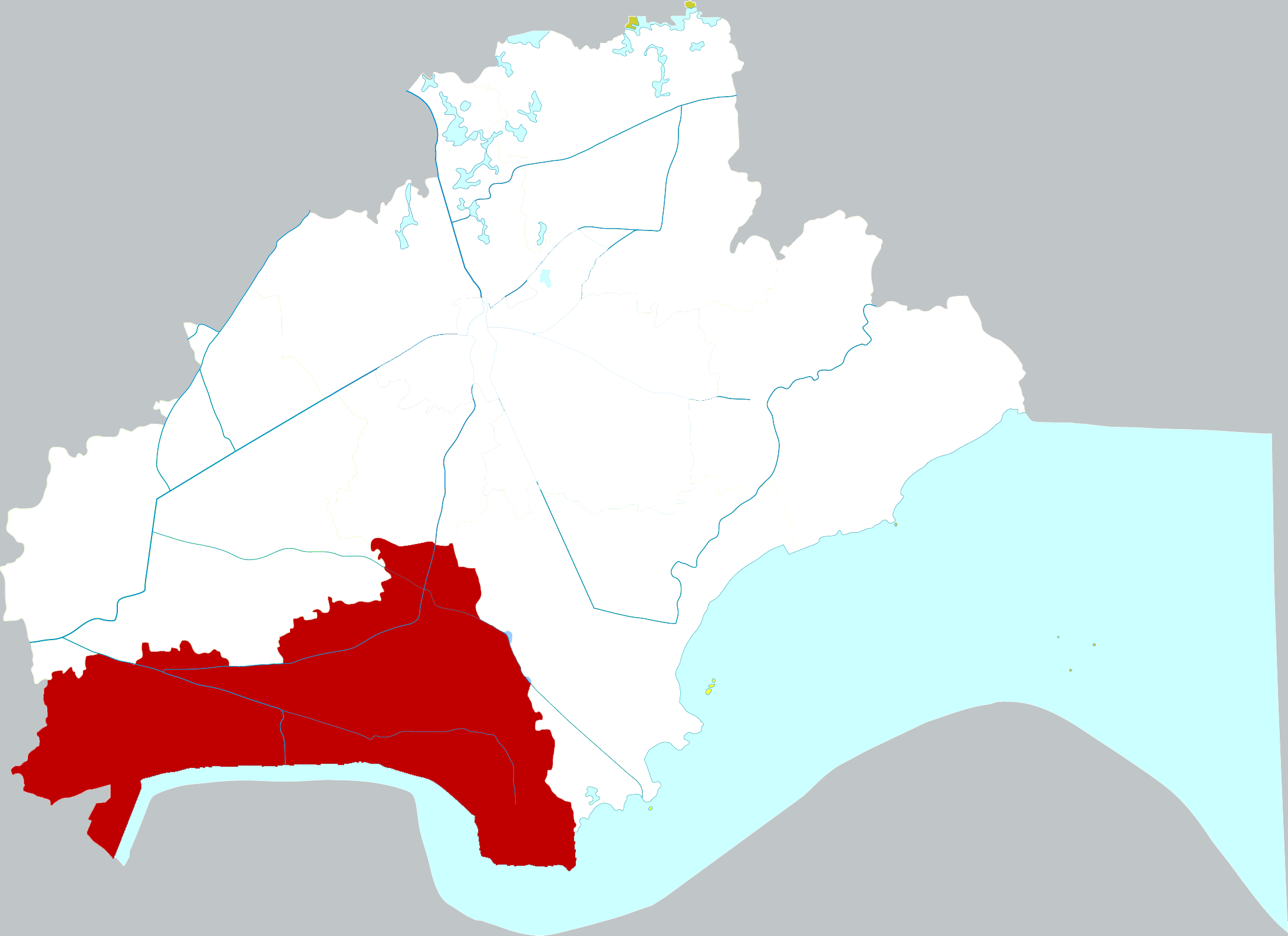
- Location of Haining City within Jiaxing

- Location in Zhejiang
- Coordinates: 30°32′N 120°41′E
- Country: People's Republic of China
- Province: Zhejiang
- Prefecture-level city: Jiaxing

Area
  - County-level city: 700.5 km^{2} (270.5 sq mi)
  - Metro: 700.5 km^{2} (270.5 sq mi)

Population (2020 census)
  - County-level city: 1,076,199
  - Density: 1,536/km^{2} (3,979/sq mi)
  - Metro: 1,076,199
  - Metro density: 1,536/km^{2} (3,979/sq mi)
- Time zone: UTC+8 (China Standard)
- GDP (Nominal): 2017
- Total: CNY 84 billion (US$13.2 billion)
- Website: www.haining.gov.cn

Haining
- Traditional Chinese: 海寧
- Simplified Chinese: 海宁
- Postal: Haining
- Literal meaning: Calmed Sea(s)
Transcriptions
Standard Mandarin
- Hanyu Pinyin: Hǎiníng
- Wade–Giles: Hai-ning

Haining (Haining) is a county-level city in Zhejiang Province, China, under the jurisdiction of Jiaxing. It is in the southern side of Yangtze River Delta, and in the north of Zhejiang. It is 125 km (78 mi) to the southwest of central Shanghai, and 61.5 km (38.2 mi) east of Hangzhou, the provincial capital. To its south lies the Qiantang River. The city has a land area of 700.5 km^{2} (270.5 sq mi) and as of the 2020 census, had a population of 1,076,199 inhabitants. Haining is known for its leather industry and spectacular tide in the Qiantang River. Since June 2021, it's linked to Hangzhou by the new suburban Hangzhou – Haining subway Line.

== Basic Facts ==
Located in the YRD region close to Shanghai and adjoining Hangzhou, Haining serves as the core of the Hangzhou Metropolitan Economic Circle and the Greater Hangzhou Bay Rim Area. The city benefits from the "one-hour economic circle" of Shanghai, Hangzhou and Suzhou with a well-developed transportation network.

Haining has been promoting integrated development between traditional and emerging industries, resulting in two 100 billion RMB-worth industry clusters centered on fashion and strategic new industries respectively. Based on key industrial development platforms such as "Three Zones and One Belt" and distinctive towns, Haining keeps strengthening industry clustering and upgrading the cross-sector industry clusters into larger innovation-driven ones.

In 2018, the International Campus of Zhejiang University was opened in the Eastern Part of Haining, with several institutes that offer joint education programs in life sciences and engineering, together with the University of Edinburgh or the University of Illinois Urbana-Champaign. The vicinity of an academic institution for education and research is believed to foster the growth of engineering and biotech companies for which a "science park" is currently under construction.

Known as the land of fish and rice and a land of silk and leather, Haining, a water-bred city in southern China, is the birthplace of Wang Guowei, a scholar of Chinese literature, Xu Zhimo, a Romantic poet, Jin Yong, a novelist of the martial arts genre, Li Shanlan, a mathematician, and Jiang Baili, a military theorist, among others.

== History ==
Haining began to be inhabited as early as the New Stone Age some 6,000 years ago. During the Spring and Autumn period (770-476BC), it became part of the State of Wu and then belonged to the State of the Yue before coming under the State of the Chu. In 221BC, during the Qin dynasty, it fell under the jurisdiction of Changshui County (present-day Jiaxing). In 223AD, or the second year of the reign of Wu State King Huangwu of the Three Kingdoms period, it became known as Yanguan County. In 1295, or the first year of the reign of Yuan Emperor Yuanzheng, the county was promoted to be Yuanguan Prefecture. It became Haining Prefecture in 558. As the sea often encroached upon the prefecture via the Qiantangjiang River, the area was renamed Haining Prefecture in 1329 in the hope of calming the waves (in Chinese, "hai" means sea and "ning" to calm or pacify), and it remains so today.

In May 1949, Haining County was occupied by the Communist Army. In June 1949, the county government was relocated to Xiashi Town. In October 1958, Haiyan County was merged into Haining. In December 1961, Haiyan County was re-established. In November 1986, Haining County was elevated to Haining City, under jurisdiction of Jiaxing. Throughout history, Yanguan Town had long served as the seat of county government. During the Second Sino-Japanese War, the county seat was moved to Yuanhua Town and even outside the county. After the war, the county government was formed in Xiashi Town.

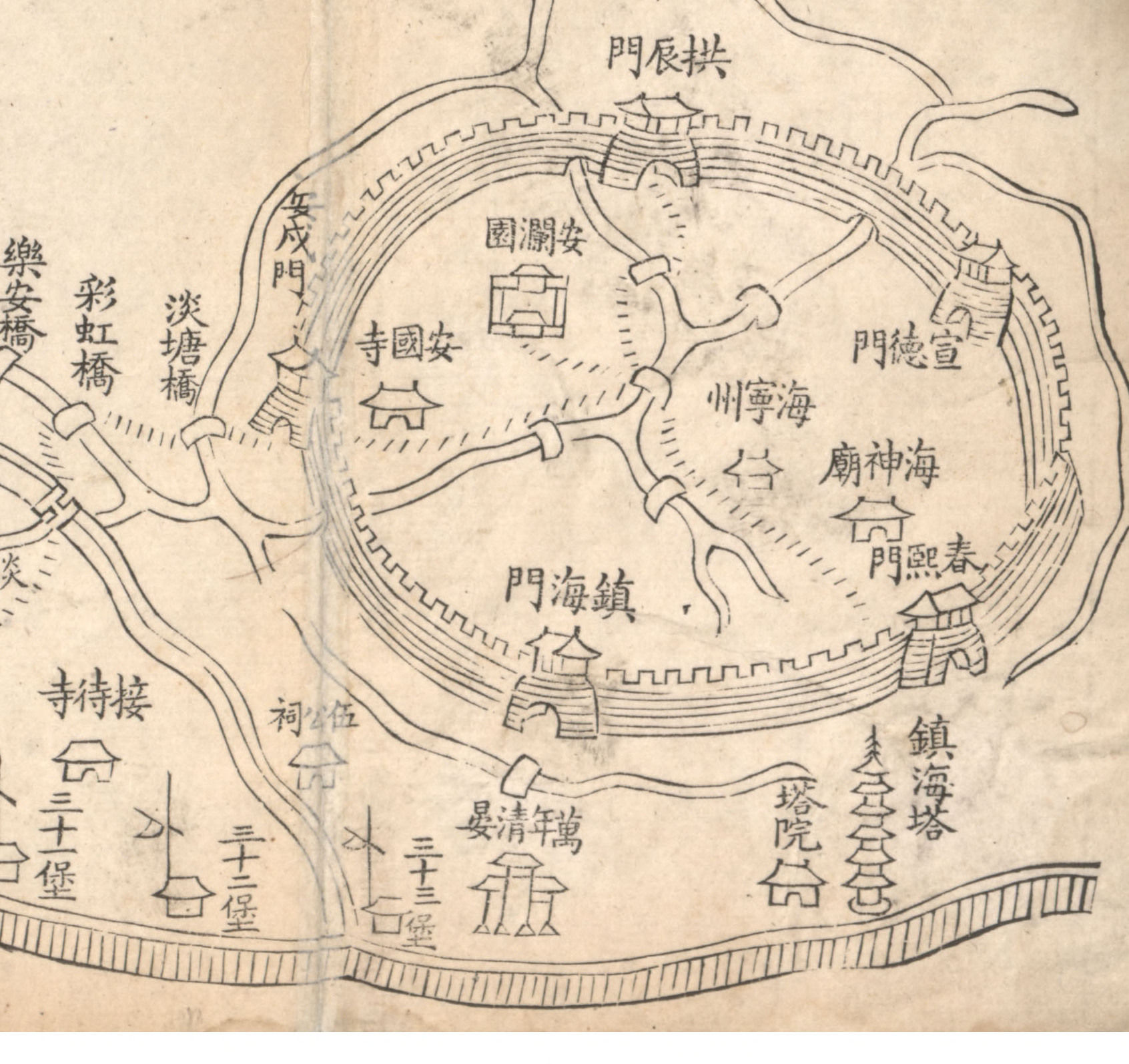
Haining c. 1765

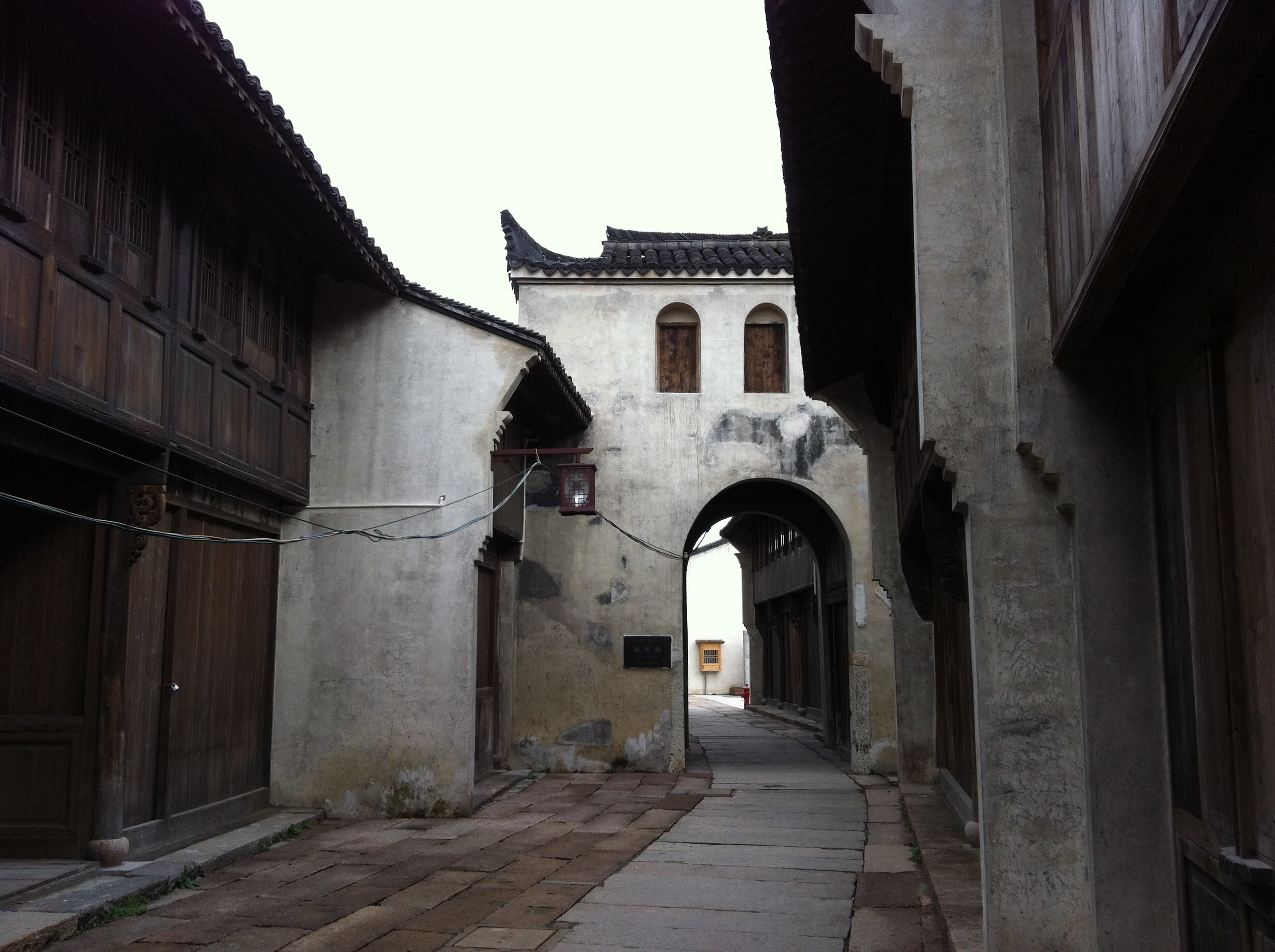

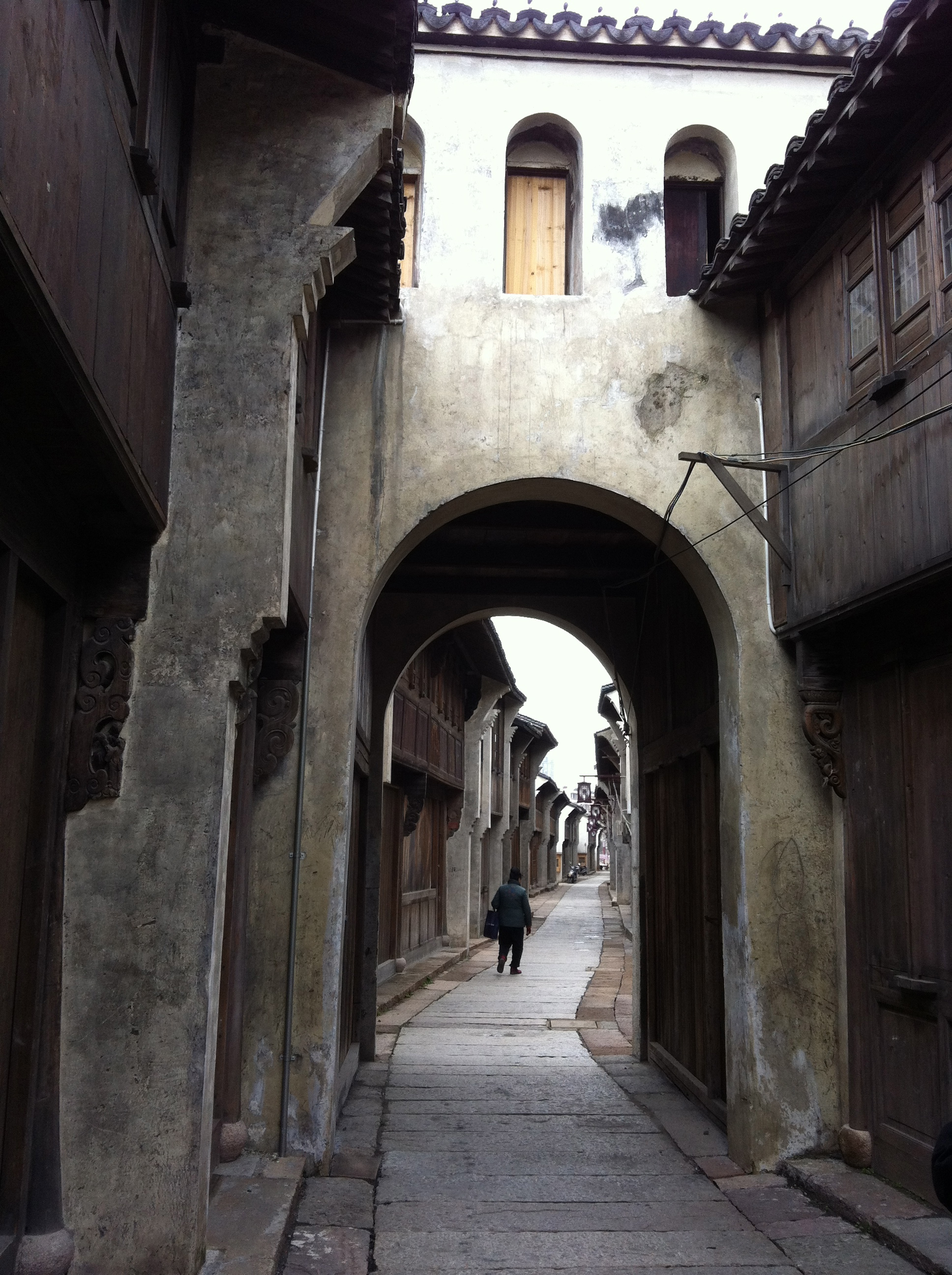

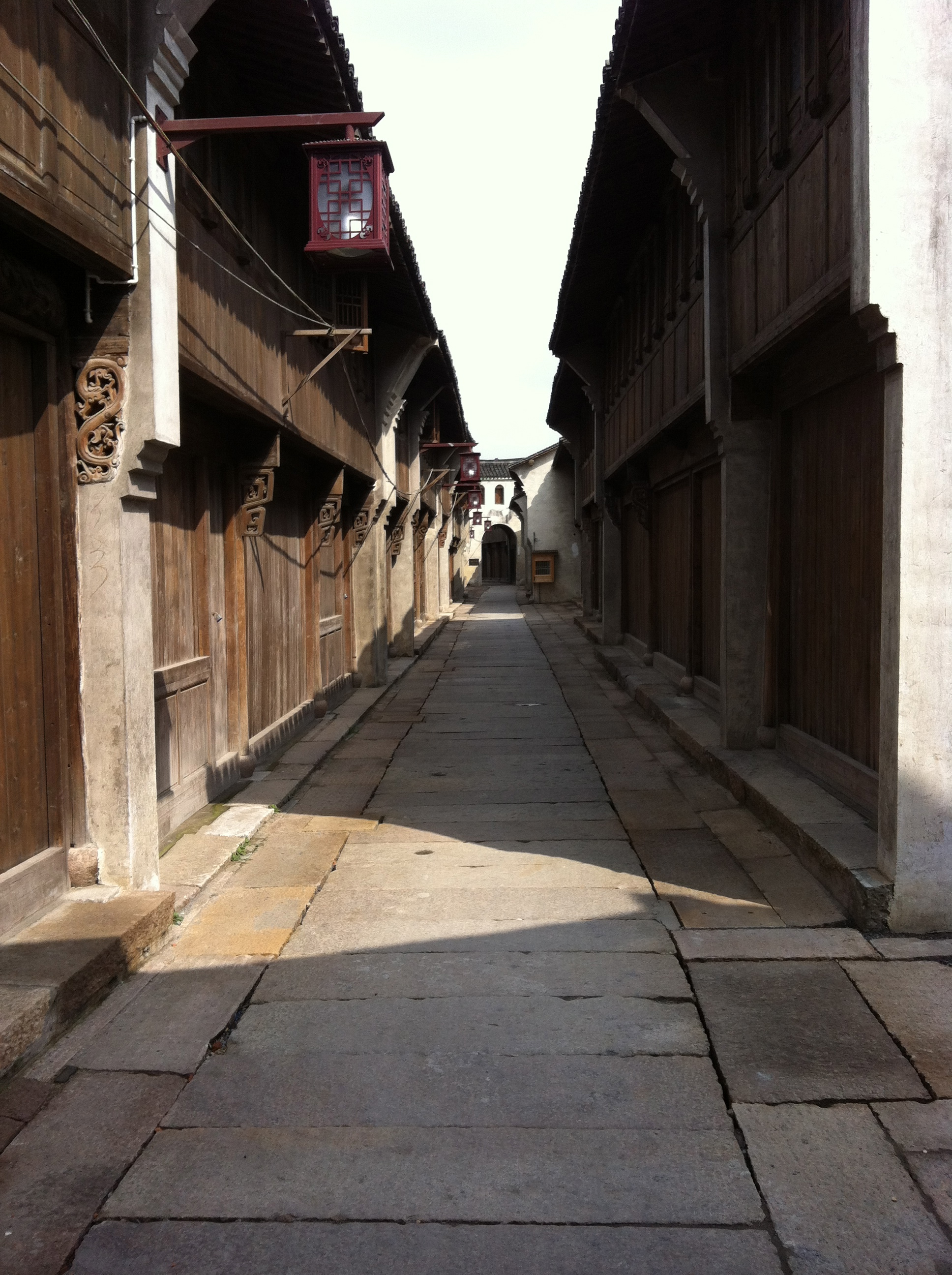

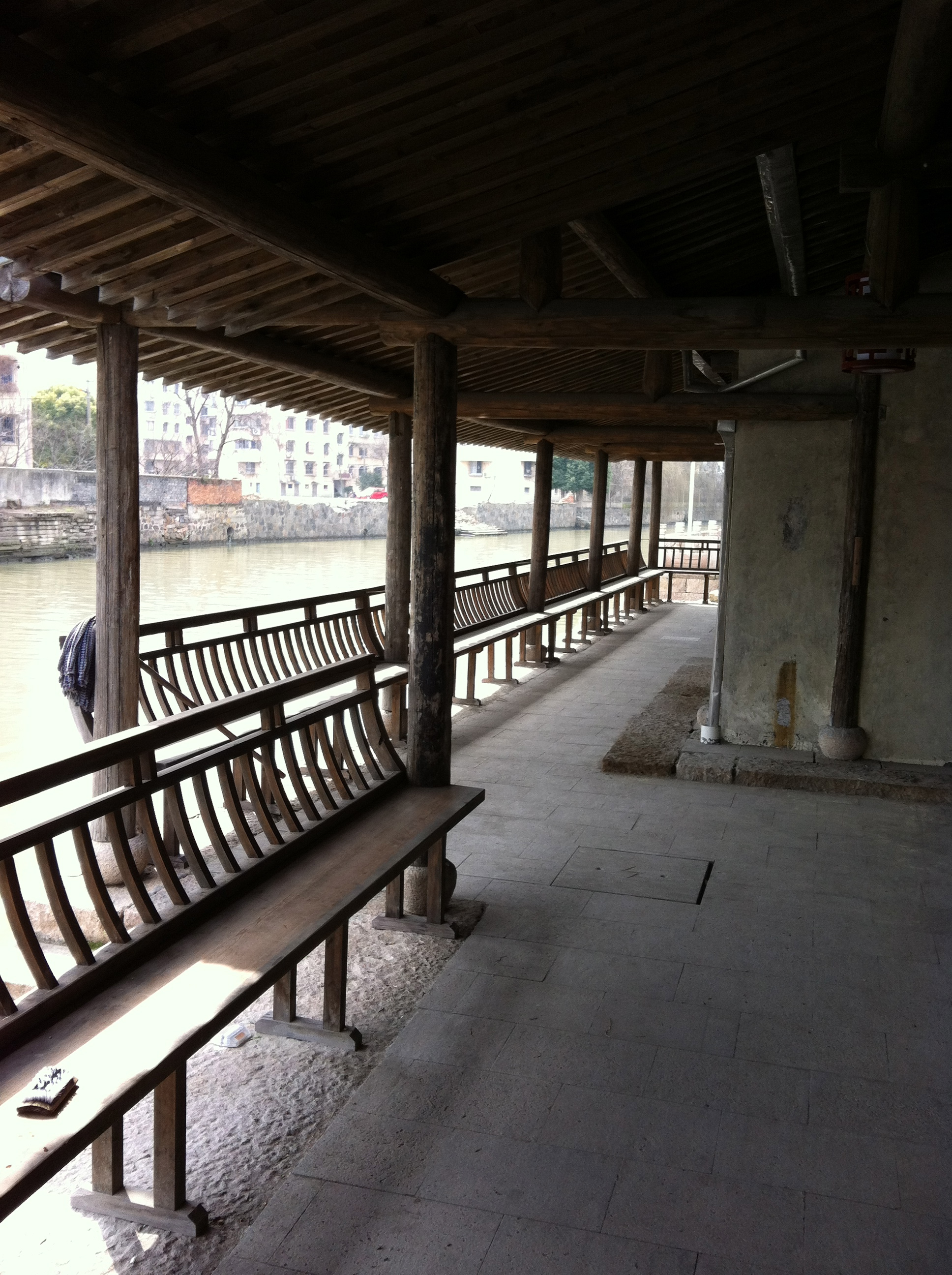

== Administrative divisions ==
Subdistricts:

- Xiashi Subdistrict (硖石街道), Haizhou Subdistrict (海洲街道), Haichang Subdistrict (海昌街道), Maqiao Subdistrict (马桥街道)

Towns:

- Xucun (许村镇), Chang'an (长安镇), Yanguan (盐官镇), Xieqiao (斜桥镇), Yuanhua (袁花镇), Dingqiao (丁桥镇), Huangwan (黄湾镇), Zhouwangmiao (周王庙镇)

== Climate ==
Climate data for Haining, elevation 5 m (16 ft), (1991–2020 normals, extremes 1981–present)
| Month | Jan | Feb | Mar | Apr | May | Jun | Jul | Aug | Sep | Oct | Nov | Dec | Year |
|---|---|---|---|---|---|---|---|---|---|---|---|---|---|
| Record high °C (°F) | 22.3 (72.1) | 27.8 (82.0) | 34.0 (93.2) | 33.2 (91.8) | 36.1 (97.0) | 37.5 (99.5) | 39.3 (102.7) | 39.7 (103.5) | 38.1 (100.6) | 34.2 (93.6) | 30.3 (86.5) | 24.1 (75.4) | 39.7 (103.5) |
| Mean daily maximum °C (°F) | 8.3 (46.9) | 10.6 (51.1) | 15.1 (59.2) | 21.0 (69.8) | 25.9 (78.6) | 28.4 (83.1) | 33.0 (91.4) | 32.3 (90.1) | 28.1 (82.6) | 23.2 (73.8) | 17.5 (63.5) | 11.1 (52.0) | 21.2 (70.2) |
| Daily mean °C (°F) | 4.4 (39.9) | 6.4 (43.5) | 10.4 (50.7) | 16.0 (60.8) | 21.2 (70.2) | 24.6 (76.3) | 28.8 (83.8) | 28.3 (82.9) | 24.1 (75.4) | 18.7 (65.7) | 12.8 (55.0) | 6.7 (44.1) | 16.9 (62.4) |
| Mean daily minimum °C (°F) | 1.5 (34.7) | 3.1 (37.6) | 6.8 (44.2) | 12.0 (53.6) | 17.3 (63.1) | 21.6 (70.9) | 25.5 (77.9) | 25.2 (77.4) | 21.0 (69.8) | 15.1 (59.2) | 9.1 (48.4) | 3.3 (37.9) | 13.5 (56.2) |
| Record low °C (°F) | −7.6 (18.3) | −7.4 (18.7) | −3.6 (25.5) | 0.2 (32.4) | 7.8 (46.0) | 12.9 (55.2) | 18.6 (65.5) | 18.8 (65.8) | 12.5 (54.5) | 3.0 (37.4) | −3.0 (26.6) | −9.9 (14.2) | −9.9 (14.2) |
| Average precipitation mm (inches) | 85.5 (3.37) | 79.6 (3.13) | 115.5 (4.55) | 96.9 (3.81) | 118.0 (4.65) | 229.2 (9.02) | 147.8 (5.82) | 177.0 (6.97) | 110.6 (4.35) | 67.6 (2.66) | 67.3 (2.65) | 57.5 (2.26) | 1,352.5 (53.24) |
| Average precipitation days (≥ 0.1 mm) | 12.2 | 11.6 | 13.7 | 12.7 | 12.7 | 15.7 | 11.8 | 12.9 | 10.6 | 7.5 | 10.1 | 9.0 | 140.5 |
| Average snowy days | 3.2 | 2.2 | 0.7 | 0.1 | 0 | 0 | 0 | 0 | 0 | 0 | 0.2 | 1.1 | 7.5 |
| Average relative humidity (%) | 78 | 78 | 77 | 75 | 77 | 83 | 79 | 81 | 82 | 79 | 80 | 77 | 79 |
| Mean monthly sunshine hours | 104.8 | 106.3 | 129.0 | 150.8 | 165.5 | 129.5 | 208.7 | 203.7 | 155.5 | 151.4 | 123.4 | 119.6 | 1,748.2 |
| Percentage possible sunshine | 33 | 34 | 35 | 39 | 39 | 31 | 49 | 50 | 42 | 43 | 39 | 38 | 39 |
Source: China Meteorological Administration

== Economic Development ==
During the 12th Five-Year Plan period, Haining's GDP grew at a compound annual growth rate of 8.24%, ranking the first in Jiaxing. In 2016, its GDP reached RMB 74.41 billion, an increase of 6.4% over the previous year, which accounts for 19.8% of the total GDP of Jiaxing, with per capita GDP of RMB 109,600, 1.34 times as much as that of Jiaxing. In 2016, the industrial structure of Haining was increasingly optimized towards one that the tertiary industry accounts for the largest percentage and the primary industry the smallest. The value added of the secondary industry of the city was RMB 32.68 billion in 2016, playing a dominant role with a percentage of 53.5% among the three levels of industries; and the tertiary industry which saw a rapid growth, accounted for 43.9%, representing 55.6% of the GDP growth.

In recent years, Haining has adopted a project- driven model for industrial development, and kept promoting the launch of major real economy projects, with a view to providing strong support for industrial transformation. In 2016, the total output value of industrial enterprises with an annual revenue of RMB 20 million or more increased by 3.6% to RMB 145.6 billion, with the value added reaching 28.05 billion RMB, up by 5.2%. In 2016, the fixed asset investment in Haining was RMB 55.54 billion, an increase of 8.0% over the previous year. The productive investment in the city reached RMB 25.23 billion, rising by 11.1%, with the proportion in the total fixed asset investment increasing to 45.42% from 44.16%, leading to an increasingly optimized investment structure. With the transformation and upgrading of industrial clusters, Haining has witnessed an increasing demand for investment in technical reformation.

== Culture ==
Haining is famous for its leather-silhouette show (also known as shadow play), colored lanterns, and tidal bore viewing.

== Industry ==
Haining has developed as a city well known for its quality leather products and textiles.

== Transportation ==
The Hangzhou–Haining intercity railway opened in June 2021 and it connects Haining with nearby Hangzhou.

== People from Haining ==
- Gu Kuang, Tang dynasty poet
- Wang Guowei, scholar in Chinese literature
- Li Shanlan, Qing dynasty mathematician
- Jiang Baili, a politician of the Republic of China
- Xu Zhimo, early 20th-century poet
- Jin Xueshu, physician and journalist
- Jin Yong, an influential modern Chinese-language novelist
- Bao Tong, former Chinese Communist Party politician
- Zhu Junyi, disgraced government official
- Jiang Ying, Chinese opera singer, music teacher and the wife of Chinese rocket scientist Qian Xuesen
