= Dominic Zhai =

American actor (born 1990)

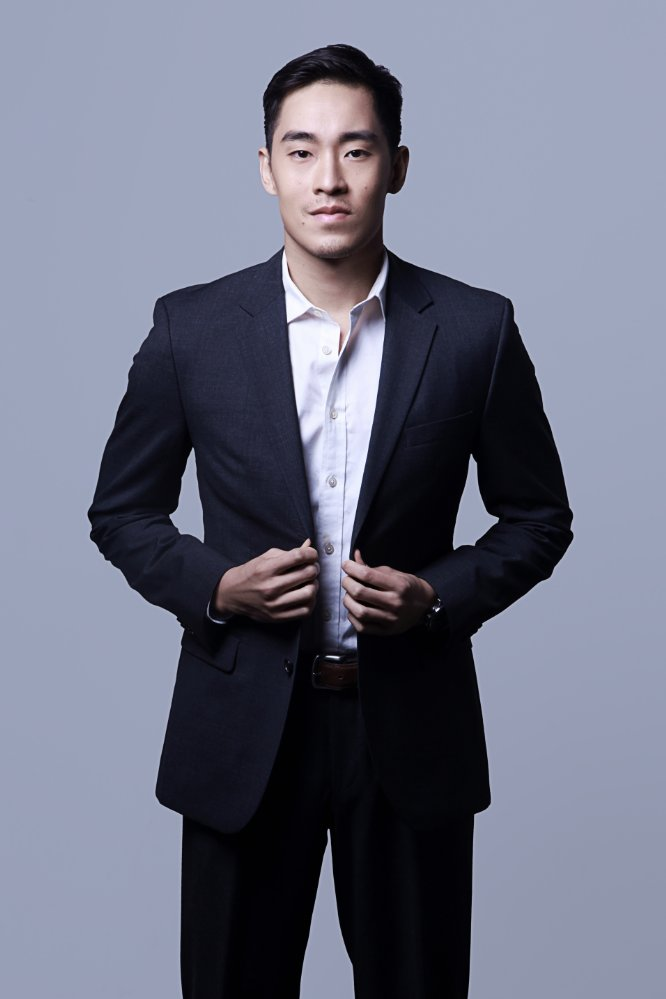
- Born: Madison, Wisconsin
- Occupation: Actor
- Years active: 2012-present

Chinese name
- Traditional Chinese: 翟士诚
- Simplified Chinese: 翟士诚
Transcriptions
Standard Mandarin
- Hanyu Pinyin: Zhái Shì Chéng

Dominic Zhai (Chinese: 翟士诚; pinyin: zhái shì chéng; born February 12, 1990) is an American actor. He recently starred as the role of Bob in the Chinese blockbuster co-production Lost in the Pacific. He currently resides in Beijing, China.

== Early life ==
Dominic was born in Madison, Wisconsin. He attended the University of Wisconsin–Madison and studied Theater, Biology, and Chinese. After graduating Phi Beta Kappa at the top of his class, he moved to Los Angeles to pursue a career in acting. Dominic also studied at the London Academy of Music and Dramatic Art as well as Upright Citizen's Brigade.

== Career ==
In Los Angeles, Dominic studied under acting coach, Aaron Speiser, whom eventually referred him to work as an acting coach and translator for Tang Wei in director Michael Mann's Blackhat. Shortly after, Dominic served as a coach for Zhang Yuqi in the film Lost in the Pacific where he also made his Chinese market theatrical debut as the role of Bob. In 2016, Dominic starred as the leading role of Dan in the $1m US-China co-production of "The Offer" TV series. In 2019, Dominic was recognized as one of Forbes 30 Under 30 in the United States which recognizes 600 business and industry figures, with 30 selected in twenty industries each.

== Filmography ==
Film
Year	Title	Role	Notes
2013	Doctor of Bagram	Sgt. Nyugen	Short film
2013	Fruitvale Station	BART Witness	Featured background
2014	Dead Drop	Korean Dancer	Short film
2014	Beautiful	Son	Short film
2014	Love Arcadia	Herman	Feature film; Los Angeles Asian Pacific Film Festival and CAAMFest Official Selection
2015	Blackhat	n/a	English dialogue/Acting coach: Tang Wei
2016	Lost in the Pacific	Bob	Feature film; Wide theatrical release Asia-Pacific regions. English dialogue/Acting coach: Zhang Yuqi
2016	S4侠降魔记	Jia	Feature film; To be wide released in Mainland China.
