= Jiang Ying =

Jiang Ying may refer to:

- Jiang Ying (musician) (1919–2012), Chinese opera singer and music educator
- Jiang Ying (volleyball) (born 1963), Chinese volleyball player
