= Hsue-shen Tsien (film) =

- Film poster
- Traditional Chinese: 錢學森
- Simplified Chinese: 钱学森
- Hanyu Pinyin: Qián Xuésēn
- Directed by: Zhang Jianya
- Written by: Chen Huaiguo; Sun Yi'an; Tao Chun
- Produced by: Huang Jianxin
- Starring: Chen Kun; Zhang Yuqi; Zhang Tielin
- Cinematography: Zhi Lei
- Edited by: Derek Hui
- Music by: Ma Shangyou
- Production companies: Xi'an Film Studio; Western Film Group Corporation
- Distributed by: Western Film Group Corporation
- Release date: 2 March 2012 (China)
- Running time: 120 minutes
- Country: China
- Language: Mandarin
- Budget: ¥60 million

Hsue-shen Tsien (Chinese: 钱学森) is a 2012 Chinese biographical film directed by Zhang Jianya, and starring Chen Kun, Zhang Yuqi, and Zhang Tielin. It was released on March 2, 2012, in China.

== Cast ==
- Chen Kun as Qian Xuesen
- Zhang Yuqi as Jiang Ying
  - Pan Hong as Jiang Ying (middle age).
- Zhang Tielin as Mao Zedong
- Liu Jing as Zhou Enlai
- Lin Yongjian as Nie Rongzhen
- Wu Yue as Zhang Gongnong
- Lian Kai as Luo Youlai
- Zhang Enqi as Qian Yongzhen, Qian Xuesen's daughter.
- Zou Xuanqi as Qian Yonggang, Qian Xuesen's son.
- George Anton as Agent Pyre

== Release ==
The film was released in China on March 2, 2012.

== Accolades ==
Date	Award	Category	Recipient(s) and nominee(s)	Result	Notes
2012	Pyongyang International Film Festival	Best Art Direction	Hsue-shen Tsien	Won	
2012	Pyongyang International Film Festival	Best Stunt	Hsue-shen Tsien	Won	
2012	11th Changchun Film Festival	Best Chinese Language Feature Film	Hsue-shen Tsien	Nominated	
2012	11th Changchun Film Festival	Best Actor	Chen Kun	Nominated	
