= Shaolin Girl =

2008 Japanese sports action comedy film by Katsuyuki Motohiro

- Directed by: Katsuyuki Motohiro
- Written by: Rika Sogo; Masashi Sogo
- Produced by: Chikahiro Andō; Chihiro Kameyama; Yoshiaki Nakajima; Fuyuhiko Nishi; Hirotsugu Usui; Stephen Chow
- Starring: Ko Shibasaki; Tōru Nakamura; Zhang Yuqi; Tin Kai-man; Lam Chi-chung; Takashi Okamura; Yōsuke Eguchi; Miyuu Sawai
- Cinematography: Akira Sakō
- Edited by: Takuya Taguchi
- Music by: Yugo Kanno
- Production company: Robot Communications
- Distributed by: Toho
- Release date: 26 April 2008
- Running time: 107 minutes
- Country: Japan
- Languages: Japanese; Mandarin; Cantonese
- Box office: (Japan) JP¥1.5 billion

Shaolin Girl (少林少女, Shōrin shōjo) is a 2008 Japanese sports action comedy film inspired by Stephen Chow's film Shaolin Soccer (2001). Unlike the original film, Shaolin Girl focuses on women's lacrosse. It starred Japanese actress Ko Shibasaki and Hong Kong actors Lam Chi Chung and Tin Kai Man return from the original film. The film was released in Japan on April 26, 2008. Stephen Chow, director and star in Shaolin Soccer, was the producer, but is not credited as a writer or director.

== Plot ==
The film focuses on young Rin Sakurazawa, who, after having trained at the Shaolin Temple for 3000 days, returns to Japan to find her dojo abandoned, and her former Shaolin master, a cook at a local restaurant. She is soon introduced to the fictional Seikan International University's Lacrosse Team. Meanwhile, the president of Seikan University, Yuichiro Oba, seems to be following a sinister objective.

== Cast ==
- Ko Shibasaki as Rin
- Toru Nakamura
- Kitty Zhang Yuqi
- Tin Kai Man
- Lam Chi Chung
- Takashi Okamura
- Yōsuke Eguchi
- Naoko Watanabe
- Miyuu Sawai
- Masanori Ishii as Electronics Store Owner

== Reception ==
This film received mediocre reviews.

== See also ==
- University of Shizuoka
