= Here Comes Fortune =

2010 Hong Kong-Chinese film by James Yuen

- Film poster
- Directed by: James Yuen
- Written by: James Yuen; Sharon Hui; Law Yiu-Fai
- Produced by: Arthur Wong; Jiang Tao; Charley Zhuo Wu; Han Xiaoli
- Starring: Alan Tam; Miriam Yeung; Kitty Zhang
- Cinematography: Ting Wo Kwong; Arthur Wong; Liu Aidong
- Edited by: Angie Lam; Jacky Leung Gwok-Wing
- Music by: Lincoln Lo
- Distributed by: China Film Group
- Release dates: 9 February 2010 (China); 25 February 2010 (Hong Kong)
- Countries: Hong Kong; China
- Language: Cantonese

Here Comes Fortune, also known as Fortune King Is Coming to Town!, is a 2010 comedy film directed and written by James Yuen, featuring a rendition of folklore regarding the God of Fortune. A Hong Kong-Chinese co-production, the film was released during Chinese Lunar new year for seasonal celebration. The cast is led by Alan Tam, Zhang Zhen, Miriam Yeung, and Kitty Zhang, and includes numerous cameo appearances of Hong Kong celebrities.

== Plot ==
The story begins as the God of Fortune is down to the annual mission to bring fortune to earth. The God of Fortune (Alan Tam) holds a meeting in the heavens to arrange other fortune fairies to not only bring fortune but love to mankind after the 2008 financial crisis.

The story is mainly split into 3 parts.

The first story is about a fortune fairy whose mission is to bring 1 billion dollars to a very down to earth school teacher (starring Tao Hong), who is a motherly figure and portrays her selfless love through community service. The fortune fairy loses his power and disguises as a little girl (starring Nuo Min), who is unfortunately kidnapped and the school teacher has to rescue him.

The second story is about another fortune fairy, number 533 (starring Kitty Zhang Yu Qi), whose mission is to bring 1 dollar to a pianist. She then finds out that this pianist is blind, and she is moved by his talent and creates opportunities for him to expose his talent, and even uses forbidden powers to grant him back his eyesight sacrificing her fairy status and banished to earth as human.

The third story focuses on the God of Fortune himself, who loses his memory while saving an office lady from being hit by a truck. The office lady (starring Miriam Yeung) had been on a streak of bad luck, bullied by her colleagues at the office. This is turned around with the help of the God of Fortune, helping her shine her hard working and inner qualities.

All the stories have a happy ending, and the movie ends with a carnival dance and all celebrities praising Chinese New Year's wishes to the audience.
