= Jump (2009 film) =

2009 Chinese-Hong Kong film by Stephen Fung

- Film poster
- Traditional Chinese: 跳出去
- Simplified Chinese: 跳出去
- Hanyu Pinyin: Tiào Chū Qù
- Jyutping: Tiu4 Ceot1 Heoi3
- Directed by: Stephen Fung
- Screenplay by: Tsang Kan-cheong; Wang Yun; Stephen Fung
- Story by: Stephen Chow
- Produced by: Stephen Chow; Po-chu Chui; Han Sanping; Connie Wong; Shi Tung-ming; Jiang Tao; Han Xiaoli; Elvis Lee; Guo Jun
- Starring: Kitty Zhang; Leon Jay Williams; Daniel Wu
- Cinematography: Edmond Fung
- Edited by: Azrael Chung
- Music by: Raymond Wong
- Production companies: Columbia Pictures Film Production Asia Limited; The Star Overseas Ltd. China Film Group Corporation; Beijing Film Studio; J.A. Media
- Distributed by: Sony Pictures Releasing
- Release date: 3 December 2009
- Running time: 87 minutes
- Countries: China; Hong Kong
- Languages: Mandarin; Cantonese (dubbed)

Jump is a 2009 comedy-drama film written and produced by Stephen Chow and directed by Stephen Fung. A Chinese-Hong Kong co-production, the film stars Kitty Zhang, Leon Jay Williams and Daniel Wu with action choreography by Yuen Cheung-yan.

== Plot ==
Phoenix is a young peasant who dreams of becoming a dance star in the big city. One day, a previous resident of the town comes and offers ten slots at his factory to those interested. Phoenix wins one, but she gives it to her best friend Snow instead. They leave their town and travel to Shanghai. Snow takes a job in garment factory. Phoenix accidentally gets a job there, too.

She sneaks out at night and takes another job as a janitor in a dance studio so she can learn enough to be in a hip hop street dance competition. After running into her several times, the owner of the studio helps her take dance classes. Eventually, he (Ron Chan) begins to drop his playboy exterior and takes her out to dinner. One day though, Phoenix catches him saying cruel things about her on the phone, although he tells her its just publicity. Suspicious, she follows him to the airport and sees him meeting a woman there. Phoenix flees back to her home, leaving Ron and Snow confused about where she went.

In her village, Phoenix realizes that she has to follow her dreams no matter what and returns to Shanghai in time for the dance competition. She steps in when one of the dancers sprains her ankle. Despite Phoenix's great dancing, the team loses to the Korean team, South City Crew. All her friends showed up to the competition though, and they reunite joyfully despite losing. A surprise addition to the party is the woman from the airport, who turns out to be Ron's sister. Phoenix and Ron make up and end up together again.

During the credits, Phoenix and her friends are seen returning to the village and teaching everyone to dance to hip hop. Even the scarecrow is dressed in hip-hop clothing.

== Cast ==
- Kitty Zhang as Phoenix
- Leon Jay Williams as Ron Chan
- Daniel Wu as doctor (cameo)
- Yao Wenxue
- Yuen Cheung-yan
- Samuel Pang
- Fung Min-hun
- Jiro Lee as a talent scout
- Prudence Kao
- Zhang Jiangcui
- Lisa Li
- Stephen Fung as an audience member (cameo)

== Production ==
Edison Chen had originally been cast as the lead actor but due to his 2008 photo scandal he was replaced by Williams.
