= Jiang Baili =

Chinese general and military writer

Jiang Baili 蔣百里
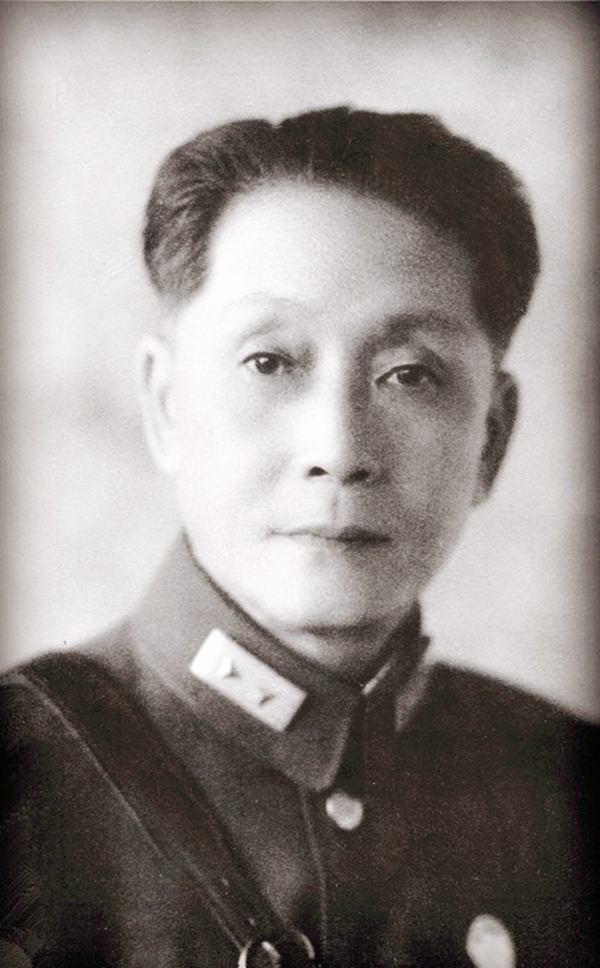
- Born: 13 October 1882; Xiashi Town, Haining, Zhejiang, Qing dynasty, China
- Died: 4 November 1938 (aged 56); Yishan County, Guangxi, Republic of China
- Spouses: Zha Pinzhen (查品珍); Satō Yato (佐藤屋登)
- Relatives: Children: Jiang Zhao (蔣昭); Jiang Yong (蔣雍); Jiang Ying; Jiang Hua (蔣華); Jiang He (蔣和); Qian Xuesen (son-in-law); Louis Cha (distant nephew)
- Military career
- Allegiance: Republic of China
- Branch: National Revolutionary Army
- Service years: 1912–1938
- Rank: General (posthumously awarded)

Jiang Fangzhen
- Traditional Chinese: 蔣方震
- Simplified Chinese: 蒋方震
Transcriptions
Standard Mandarin
- Hanyu Pinyin: Jiǎng Fāngzhèn
- Wade–Giles: Chiang Fang-chen

Baili (courtesy name)
- Chinese: 百里
Transcriptions
Standard Mandarin
- Hanyu Pinyin: Bǎilǐ
- Wade–Giles: Pai-li

Danning (art name)
- Traditional Chinese: 澹寧
- Simplified Chinese: 澹宁
Transcriptions
Standard Mandarin
- Hanyu Pinyin: Dànníng
- Wade–Giles: Tan-ning

Jiang Fangzhen (13 October 1882 – 4 November 1938), courtesy name Baili and art name Danning, better known as Jiang Baili, was a Chinese military writer, strategist, trainer and army general of the Republic of China.

== Life and career under the Qing dynasty ==
Jiang was born in Xiashi Town, Haining County, Zhejiang Province in 1882 during the late Qing dynasty. In 1898, he sat for the imperial examination at the provincial level and obtained a xiucai degree. The following year, he gained admission to the Qiushi Academy (now Zhejiang University) in Hangzhou, and later to Tsinghua University in 1901. He was recognised as a talent by the provincial officials, who sponsored him to further his studies abroad in Japan at the Tokyo Shinbu Gakko and later the Imperial Japanese Army Academy. During his time in Japan, he joined the Tongmenghui and became the chief editor of the publication Zhejiang Chao (浙江潮). He also participated in activities organised by Chinese students studying in Japan.

Jiang returned to China in 1906 and briefly served as an adviser to Zhao Erxun, the Governor of Manchuria, before leaving to further his military studies in Germany. In 1910, after returning to China, he was recommended by Liangbi (1877–1912), a former classmate at the Imperial Japanese Army Academy, to serve as a guandai (管帶; captain) in the Imperial Guards. He was later reassigned to serve in the office of Zhao Erxun again. In 1911, he became the chief adviser of the military training office in Manchuria.

== Life during the Warlord Era ==
After the Wuchang Uprising broke out in 1911, Jiang accepted an invitation from his friend, Jiang Zungui, the Governor of Zhejiang Province, to serve as the chief adviser in his office. Later on, Yinchang recommended Jiang to Yuan Shikai. In 1912, Jiang was appointed as the principal of the Baoding Military Academy. He attempted suicide in 1913 after failing to obtain the funding he had promised to get for his students. He was saved in time by his bodyguards and earned himself a reputation for regarding keeping his promises as more important than his life. In 1913, he became a first-class military adviser to Yuan Shikai, who had become the President of the newly established Republic of China. He wrote New Interpretations of Sun Tzu (孫子新釋) in the following year.

In 1916, after Yuan Shikai declared himself emperor and created the short-lived Empire of China, Jiang strongly objected to Yuan's decision and fled from Beiping to Guangdong Province. He joined the warlord Cai E in attacking Yuan Shikai and served as the chief adviser of the combined military forces of Guangdong and Guangxi provinces in the campaign against Yuan, who died later that year. Jiang accompanied Cai E, who was ill, to Japan to seek medical treatment, but Cai still died of illness eventually.

In 1917, Jiang became a consultant in the office of Li Yuanhong, who had succeeded Yuan Shikai as President of the Republic of China. During this time, he wrote Common Knowledge About the Military (軍事常識). In the subsequent years, Jiang spent his time mainly on writing books, editing magazines and involvement in societies for literature and poetry appreciation. In 1918, he followed Liang Qichao on a study tour to Europe and became active in the New Culture Movement after returning to China in 1920. In 1925, he travelled to Hankou, where he became chief-of-staff to the warlord Wu Peifu. He urged Wu Peifu to ally with the Nationalist government in Guangdong Province to fight the warlord Zhang Zuolin, but Wu rejected his suggestion. He left Wu Peifu in 1926 after the latter decided to ally with Zhang Zuolin's Fengtian Clique against Feng Guozhang's Zhili clique. He then travelled to Shanghai to join Sun Chuanfang, but decided to leave after Sun allied with Zhang Zuolin.

== Service under the Nationalist government ==
In 1929, Tang Shengzhi, a former student of Jiang at the Baoding Military Academy, turned against Chiang Kai-shek, the leader of the Kuomintang-led Nationalist government. In January 1930, Jiang was implicated and imprisoned because of his close ties to Tang Shengzhi. He was released in 1931 after the Mukden Incident broke out. In 1933, Jiang travelled to Japan on a study tour and realised that an impending war between China and Japan was inevitable. After returning to China, he formulated many defensive strategies and urged the Nationalist government to prepare for war.

In 1935, Jiang was appointed as a high-level consultant in the Military Affairs Commission. In the following year, he travelled to Europe again on a study tour. After returning to China, he advised the Nationalist government to develop its air force and further modernise the military. During the trip, he also secretly contacted the German and Italian governments and urged them to support China if war broke out. During the Xi'an Incident in December 1936, Jiang managed to persuade Zhang Xueliang to release Chiang Kai-shek.

In the summer of 1937, Jiang wrote Treatise on National Defence (國防論), in which he proposed that if war broke out between China and Japan, China could not win in the short term, so it should try to wear down Japan over the long term. In September 1937, he was appointed as Chiang Kai-shek's special ambassador on official visits to Germany and Italy. After returning to China, he wrote The Japanese (日本人) and Basic Perspectives on a War of Resistance (抗戰的基本觀念) to explain his views on how China would eventually win in a war against Japan. In August 1938, he was appointed as the acting principal of the Whampoa Military Academy.

He died of illness later that year on 4 November in Yishan County, Guangxi Province. The Nationalist government posthumously awarded him the rank of general.

== Personal life ==
Jiang married twice. His first wife was Zha Pinzhen (查品珍). His second wife was Satô Yato (佐藤屋登; 1890–1978), a nurse he met in Japan. He had five children: Jiang Zhao (蔣昭), Jiang Yong (蔣雍), Jiang Ying, Jiang Hua (蔣華) and Jiang He (蔣和). His third daughter, Jiang Ying, became a musician and married the scientist Qian Xuesen. Jiang was also distantly related to the wuxia novelist Louis Cha through his first wife Zha Pinzhen, who was a distant aunt of Cha.
