= Lost in the Pacific =

- Theatrical release poster
- Directed by: Vincent Zhou
- Written by: Vincent Zhou; Peter Cameron
- Produced by: Vincent Zhou
- Starring: Brandon Routh; Zhang Yuqi
- Cinematography: Scott Winig
- Edited by: David Hsin
- Music by: Alec Puro
- Production companies: Shanghai Hongliang Media & Culture Co. Asia Tropical Films
- Distributed by: Huace Pictures
- Release date: 29 January 2016
- Running time: 90 minutes
- Country: China
- Languages: Mandarin; English

Lost in the Pacific (simplified Chinese: 蒸发太平洋; traditional Chinese: 蒸發太平洋; pinyin: Zhēngfā Tàipíng Yáng) is a 2016 Chinese action film starring Brandon Routh and Zhang Yuqi. It is a sequel to the 2014 film Last Flight. Filming took place in Spring 2015 at Pinewood Iskandar Malaysia Studios in Malaysia. It was released on 29 January 2016.

== Plot ==
In 2020, two armed soldiers pass through the dark forest of Fortune Island, a seemingly deserted island in the middle of the Pacific. Suddenly, something in the darkness catches their attention, they scream in terror. On the other side of earth, the owner of Ocean Airlines, Mr. Gary Gao, launches the maiden voyage of his luxurious new passenger aircraft, the state-of-the-art, A390. The trip begins in Rio and much fanfare will await the aircraft's arrival in Hong Kong. The VIP guests on board include billionaire Prince Khadsa of Saudi Arabia, famed pop singer Colin, award-winning Hong Kong actress Lily Young, retired American sports star Rodman, renowned journalist, Mia Ren and her cameraman, Bob, of International News Web, celebrated Sichuan chef Mr. Liu, and the acclaimed blind cellist Kim Woo Nam.

Unbeknownst to all but himself, Gary and Ocean Airlines are in dire straits financially and Gary intends to confirm Prince Khadsa's proposed investment during the flight to save the company. Soon after takeoff it is learned that Chef Liu became ill and could not make the flight. Chef Liu has sent Mike, an American, to replace him. While everybody is enjoying the many amenities of the luxury flight, the aircraft passes through a major thunderstorm over the Pacific and gets struck by lightning. The crew, fearing the plane has been damaged, wants to land somewhere as soon as possible to inspect the aircraft. At first Gary, who wants to reach Hong Kong in record time, resists the crew's insistence on landing and tells them to push on at any cost. Eventually Gary decides to allow the crew to land the plane on the seemingly deserted Fortune Island, so they can see if there has been any irreparable damage. To avoid any notice of the emergency landing, Gary turns off the plane's location tracker.

Despite the tremendous storm, the crew successfully lands the A390 on the island. While the passengers have been ordered to stay on the plane, Ruoxin and Captain Jason Anderson go outside to inspect the engines. When they are about to return inside, Ruoxin discovers that journalist Mia Ren and her cameraman have secretly slipped out of the cabin and are now under attack from unknown creatures. Suddenly, a multitude of black shadows jump out of the bush and kill Cpt. Jason and the cameraman. When Ruoxin and Mia Ren are about to be ripped to shreds by the creatures, gunshots are heard and they are momentarily saved. The bullets are from two armed soldiers moving swiftly in a jeep. The soldiers rescue the people on the ground and they all get on the plane together. The soldiers are Vincent Rigs and Nikki Lee. They claim to have been sent by the Army to eliminate the monsters that are inhabiting the island. When the A390's radio communications system is discovered to be badly damaged, Vincent suggests re-routing the flight to an Army coordination point in the Pacific.

It turns out that chef Mike was formerly Special Forces and he recognizes that Vincent and Nikki are not who they say they are. He doubts the validity of the coordination points, but neither Ruoxin nor Gary believes him. In the meantime, a series of dreadful events happen, one after another. First, Peter is killed for discovering Vincents true identity, then Lily Young and an air hostess are killed by one of the creatures that has managed to get on the plane. Facing the panic and the rebellion from the now-convinced Ruoxin and Mike, Vincent and Nikki reveal their true purpose, proceed to hijack the plane, and take everyone onboard hostage. The so-called destination is a retired Nimitz aircraft carrier. After several tries Ruoxin dramatically lands the plane on the carrier, clipping the wing as she does so. Most of the survivors reach the deck, while the broken A390 slides off the carrier and sinks into the ocean.

Vincent asks Nikki to watch the hostages, while he goes below deck to find Dr. Han who has promised him $10 Million for a soil sample from the cave that the creatures inhabit. The fact that there seems to be no other people on the carrier makes Vincent nervous. Vincent finds Han who tells him that the experiment went out of control and the creatures had mutated, killed everyone else on the carrier, and were now reproducing. Dr. Han reveals to Vincent that as a last ditch effort he has rigged the carrier's nuclear power engine to explode to destroy the experiment and the creatures. Vincent quickly realizes that he will need to stop the explosion from happening if he is to live and ever see the $10 Million. On his way to the engines he is stopped by Mike and after a heated fight, Vincent is dead.

Ruoxin successfully starts the ignition of a helicopter on the deck of the carrier. Mike makes his way back up to the deck and narrowly jumps onto the helicopter as it leaves the ground. As the helicopter flies far away from the carrier, a huge mushroom cloud arises from the horizon, the carrier, experiment, and creatures have been destroyed.

In mid-credit scenes, a mutated cat is shown to be hiding on the helicopter.

== Cast ==
- Brandon Routh as Mike
- Zhang Yuqi as Ruoxin
- Russell Wong as Gary Gao
- Vincent M. Ward as Rodman
- Dai Xiangyu as Xiang
- Bernice Liu as Nikki Lee
- Debbie Goh as Lily Young
- Sunny Wang as Colin
- Jiang Mengjie as Mia
- Bobby Tonelli as Jason
- Dominic Zhai as Bob
- Natasha Lloyd as Kelly
- Tazito Garcia as Prince Khadsa
- Steven Dasz as Soldier 2
