= All About Women =

2008 Chinese-Hong Kong film by Tsui Hark

- Theatrical release poster
- Directed by: Tsui Hark
- Screenplay by: Kwak Jae-yong; Tsui Hark
- Story by: Kwak Jae-yong; Tsui Hark
- Produced by: Tsui Hark; Nansun Shi; Huang Jianxin; Elvis Lee
- Starring: Zhou Xun; Zhang Yuqi; Gwei Lun-mei
- Cinematography: Choi Sung-Fai
- Edited by: Tsui Hark; Hideyuki Mako; Chan Ki-Hop
- Music by: Paul Lee; Lee Shih-Shiong
- Production companies: Dong Yang Huan Yu Media; Polybona Films; Beijing Enlight Pictures
- Distributed by: J.A. Movies (H.K.) Ltd. J.A. Media Ltd. Polybona Films
- Release date: 11 December 2008
- Running time: 120 minutes
- Countries: China; Hong Kong
- Language: Mandarin

All About Women (Chinese: 女人不坏; pinyin: Nǚrén bú huài), originally titled She Ain't Mean and Not All Women Are Bad, is a 2008 romantic comedy-drama film directed by Tsui Hark. A Chinese-Hong Kong co-production, the film stars Zhou Xun, Zhang Yuqi, and Gwei Lun-mei. It tells a series of interwoven stories focusing on the lives of three women and their romantic relationships. Zhou plays a clumsy woman who secretly develops a pheromone drug patch, which serves as a plot device for the film; Kwai plays a punk rock band singer, who is also a boxer and novelist; and Zhang plays a wealthy attractive woman.

Originally set to be an updated version of Tsui's Peking Opera Blues, All About Women was shot in Beijing, China, and was released in China and Hong Kong on 11 December 2008. The film was later released in Singapore on 8 January 2009.

== Plot ==
Three women, none of them bad, but one calls herself "invincible"—31-year-old Tang Lu. Her beauty makes men fall for her like moths to a flame, and it is also her greatest weapon for career success. She doesn't believe in love, nor in anything that can't be monetized like her figure. But then she meets a professor who is completely immune to her charms. Though she is against marriage, she proposes to him for the sake of work, only to face a humiliating rejection—her first ever defeat. Determined to find out why, she uncovers an unexpected truth.

The second woman, Fan Fan, works as a medical examiner at a health check-up center. She is plain-looking, wears thick glasses, and is far better at performing rectal exams than she is at attracting men. However, through her knowledge of men and her scientific mindset, she finds her true love. But the very secret to her success in romance soon becomes the biggest threat to her relationship.

The third woman, Tie Ling, is a rock band lead singer and a boxer. She has the perfect boyfriend—but only in her imagination. Her admirers try every way to bring her back to reality, but she insists on staying in her fantasy world. Until one day, she realizes that the man from her imagination is standing right in front of her. Now she must decide whether to follow this perfect man or stay where she is.

== Cast ==
- Zhou Xun plays Ou Fanfan, a clumsy worker at a medical clinic who becomes petrified upon contact with any man. She is completely sightless without her thick glasses, and secretly develops a pheromone drug patch, which allows men to be attracted to her. Zhou was immediately cast after director Tsui Hark felt that she should be cast in a comedic role. She accepted the role, having been a fan of Tsui's films. She also found Tsui to be a colourful and amusing person, as while during production she was able to sample many different lives every day. During filming, she once had a record of changing into 12 different costumes and 12 different make-ups in one single day: "Even if it took half an hour for each make-up, it would still mean 6 hours of being 'manipulated' by others, I felt like a puppet, very exhausting."
- Zhang Yuqi plays Tang Lu, a corporate businesswoman, who tends to follow her head, not her heart. Zhang commented on the character, and how her friends relate to Tang Lu: "I've got female friends like that. They're actually very happy and think they're doing very well. Only other people think that they're sad and lonely, and society portrays them as such." To prepare her for the role, director Tsui Hark hired an expert to give Zhang some training. Zhang admitted to having some pressure on the film's set as she feared destroying the expensive costumes and props.
- Gwei Lun-mei plays Tie Ling, a 19-year-old boxer, internet novelist, and punk rock singer. She has an "imaginary" boyfriend, unaware that no one else can see him. To prepare for the role, Kwai learned how to ride a motorbike, and weave through traffic on it: "I was scared out of my wits. A lot of money had to be spent as I ended up scratching lots of vehicles along the way." Kwai also commented on the costumes for the film: "It's the first time I realised a costume designer can be so miraculous. Putting on the clothes by William Chang, I felt as if I were transformed into another person...this is a far cry from my usual self."
- Godfrey Gao plays X, a famous rock superstar, who is Tie Ling's imaginary boyfriend.
- Alex Fong plays Professor Wu Mong-Gu, a charismatic environmentalist. Fong described his character as someone who "must not be dressed too elaborately," and that "he dresses only in simple clothing."
- Stephen Fung plays Sima Xiaogang, Fanfan's love interest, who resembles her former dance instructor. He is an indie rocker, who winds up being a human experiment for Fanfan's pheromone drug patch. Fung joined the production of the film mainly due to his passion for music.
- Eddie Peng plays Mo Qiyan, Tang Lu's cousin and secretary. He is a nerdy, bespectacled guy, who is attracted to Tie Ling. Screenwriter Kwak Jae-yong described the character as being similar to that of Cha Tae Hyeon, a character from his 2001 Korean film My Sassy Girl.
- Shen Chang plays Tian Yuan, a timid colleague, who is hired to pose as Tang Lu in the hopes of initiating a deal with Professor Wu.
- Zhang Xinyi
- Izumi Liu
- Yiyad Zhang

The film features cameos from four filmmakers: the film's director, Tsui Hark, in a deleted scene, cameos as a taxi driver; co-screenwriter Kwak Jae-yong appears as a noodle restaurant patron; Hong Kong film director Jacob Cheung appears as himself, playing an unlucky patient; and actor–film producer Henry Fong appears as Ou Fanfan's boss.

== Production ==
=== Development ===
To commemorate on the 25th anniversary of his production company Film Workshop, director Tsui Hark wanted the film to be one of several remakes of films produced by the company. Tsui expressed his inspiration for All About Women being a calligraphy with the words She Ain't Mean written in Chinese (女人不坏). He said that after seeing the drawing, he awoke one day, and images of countless women flashed across his mind. While promoting his 1991 film Once Upon a Time in China in Seoul, Korea, Tsui attended a seminar, where he met Korean filmmaker Kwak Jae-yong. Tsui began working on a script titled She's a Hooligan, developing various characters, who began to gradually form into something more concrete after several days. When Tsui discovered that Kwak was working on a script similar to his, he abandoned his own script, and collaborated with Kwak. Kwak wrote the script in Korean before it was translated into Chinese. Tsui then commented on and amended the Chinese version before it was translated back into Korean. The script was later re-edited by Kwak and retranslated into Chinese.

=== Filming ===
All About Women was shot in Beijing, China from 1 January to April 2008, and was hailed as updated version of Tsui's 1986 film Peking Opera Blues. In March, Tsui, for the first time as a filmmaker, invited the Chinese press visit to the set of All About Women in Changping, Beijing. Kitty Zhang commented on Tsui's style of filmmaking as the director would frequently make changes to the screenplay: "Often, when I arrived on the set in the morning, he'd hand me three pages of the script, saying that it's what we'd be filming today. I was taken aback. What he gave me earlier only had two paragraphs. Why such a big change?"

Upon being questioned, Tsui admitted there would be changes to the screenplay, since he did not have everything he wanted in the film on the shooting script.

== Accolades ==
28th Hong Kong Film Awards

- Nominated – Zhang Yuqi for Best New Actor
- Nominated – William Chang for Best Costume Design
