= Jin Xueshu =

Chinese physician and journalist

- 金学曙
- Born: January 23, 1922; Haining, Jiaxing, Zhejiang Province, China
- Died: March 17, 2014 (aged 92); Beijing, China
- Resting place: Babaoshan Revolutionary Cemetery, Beijing

Jin Xueshu (Chinese: 金学曙; pinyin: Jīnxuéshǔ; January 23, 1922 – March 17, 2014) was a Chinese physician and journalist.

== Early life ==
Jin Xueshu (金学曙) was born on January 23, 1922, in Haining, Jiaxing, Zhejiang Province, and relocated to Shanghai during his early childhood. Her parents died during her childhood; her father, an aircraft mechanic, was killed in an air raid by the Japanese Air Force, and her mother died shortly thereafter.

== Career ==
Jin was described by Deng Tuo, then president and editor-in-chief of the newspaper, as "an outstanding woman of the new era." She received several honors throughout her career, including the titles of "National March 8th Red-Banner Pacesetter," "Lifetime Achievement Award for Outstanding Journalists," and "Beijing Advanced Worker."

Jin was a member of the Chinese Communist Party and played a role in safeguarding critical documents from being seized by Kuomintang authorities.She later worked at the Shanghai Hongqiao Sanatorium, where, in May 1949, she assisted prominent activists Zhang Lan and Luo Longji in evading assassination attempts.

In 1950, Jin joined the People's Daily, where she served as a journalist while continuing to practice medicine. She often visited patients before and after her editorial work. In 1986, she was awarded the Lifetime Achievement Award by the All-China Journalists Association in recognition of her contributions to journalism.

Throughout her career, Jin was credited with saving many lives through both her medical and political efforts. She retired in 2003 at the age of 81.

== Personal life ==
In 1948, Jin married Shi Xizhi, who was actively involved in the development of China's railway infrastructure. The couple initially resided in Shanghai but later relocated to Beijing, following national campaigns aimed at encouraging skilled professionals from Shanghai to contribute to the capital's development.

== Death ==
On March 17, 2014, Jin Xueshu died in Beijing at the age of 92. Her ashes were interred with those of her husband at Babaoshan Revolutionary Cemetery.

== Honors ==
- In 1957, Jin was recognized as an Advanced Worker in Beijing for her contributions to society.
- In 1960, she received the honorary title of National March 8th Red-Banner Pacesetter from the All-China Women's Federation.
- In 1986, she was awarded the Lifetime Achievement Award for Outstanding Journalists by the All-China Journalists Association, acknowledging her longstanding impact in the field of journalism..
