= Zhang Yuqi =

Chinese actress

- 张雨绮
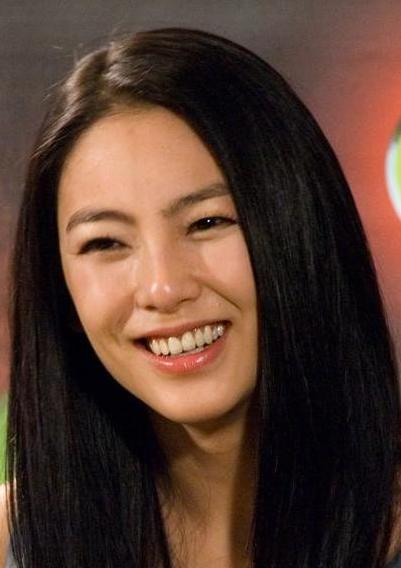
- Zhang in 2008
- Born: Zhang Shuang; 8 August 1987 (age 39); Dezhou, Shandong, China
- Other name: Kitty Zhang
- Occupation: Actress
- Years active: 2007–present
- Agent: Zhang Yuqi Studio (Easy Entertainment)
- Spouses: Wang Quan'an (m. 2011; div. 2015) Yuan Bayuan (m. 2016; div. 2018)
- Children: 2

Chinese name
- Traditional Chinese: 張雨綺
- Simplified Chinese: 张雨绮
Transcriptions
Standard Mandarin
- Hanyu Pinyin: Zhāng Yǔqǐ

Chinese name
- Traditional Chinese: 張爽
- Simplified Chinese: 张爽
Transcriptions
Standard Mandarin
- Hanyu Pinyin: Zhāng Shuǎng

Zhang Yuqi (Chinese: 张雨绮; born 8 August 1987), also known as Kitty Zhang, is a Chinese actress. She rose to fame for Stephen Chow's film CJ7 (2008) and reunited with him in The Mermaid (2016). Her other notable films include All About Women (2008), White Deer Plain (2012), and Legend of the Demon Cat (2017).

== Early life and career ==
Zhang was born in Dezhou, Shandong province. She left Shandong at the age of 15 to attend the Affiliated Chinese Opera School of Shanghai Theatre Academy, a vocational school for Chinese opera talents.

Zhang appeared in a minor, uncredited role in the 2007 film The Longest Night in Shanghai. Stephen Chow first noticed her in an advertisement for Kentucky Fried Chicken, and recruited her into his agency. She soon had her breakout role in the science fiction film CJ7, playing a young teacher opposite Chow. The film brought her major media attention as a "Sing girl".

After CJ7, Zhang appeared in the Japanese film Shaolin Girl (which was also produced by Chow). Chow considered casting her in Dragonball Evolution, but the role was ultimately given to another actress. Zhang then starred in the romantic comedy All About Women playing a headstrong business woman. In 2009, she played a country girl with a passion for hip-hop music in Jump, a musical comedy directed by Stephen Fung and penned by Stephen Chow.

Zhang ventured next to the horror genre in the Curse of the Deserted, where she played a college student scoping out a haunted house. She then starred in the kungfu comedy The Butcher, the Chef and the Swordsman, playing a dance hostess.

In 2012, Zhang was cast in the role of Qian Xuesen's wife, Jiang Ying in the biopic of the author. She then starred in the film adaptation of the Chinese literary classic White Deer Plain written by Chen Zhongshi. She plays Tian Xiao'e, a sensual, illiterate woman who follows her instincts. The role posed a challenge to Zhang, as it involved intimate scenes. Many other actresses rejected the role. Zhang won her first "Best Actress" trophy at the Chinese American Film Festival. She was also voted the Most Popular Actress at the Beijing College Student Film Festival for her performance.

In 2014, Zhang played a supporting role in Peter Chan's film Dearest, receiving acclaim for performance as a mother who lost a child.

In 2015, Zhang was cast alongside Brandon Routh in Lost in the Pacific, a sci-fi action adventure film directed by Vincent Zhou.

Zhang reunited with mentor Stephen Chow in his 2016 film The Mermaid, where she played the film's antagonist. Variety praised Zhang for "letting herself go, with her bitchiness and predatory sex appeal". The Mermaid broke the Chinese box office record and revived Zhang's waning film career.

In 2017, Zhang starred in the fantasy comedy film The Golden Monk directed by Wong Jing. The same year, she starred in Chen Kaige's fantasy mystery film Legend of the Demon Cat, for which she won the Best Supporting Actress award at the Asian Film Awards.

== Personal life ==
Zhang and Wang Quan'an had a whirlwind romance in 2011, and they married on 18 April in that year. Zhang announced they were divorced on 2 July 2015.

Zhang married businessman Yuan Bayuan in October 2016. The couple had a set of boy–girl twins born in the United States in October 2017. On 27 September 2018, they announced their divorce. They briefly reconciled before separating again in January 2019, when Yuan accused Zhang of infidelity.

Following Zhang's relationship with Yuan becoming public, Ge Xiaoqian, a former partner of Yuan who had held a marriage ceremony with him and has a daughter by him but was not legally married, alleged that Zhang had interfered in her relationship with Yuan. Ge further claimed that one of Zhang's twins had been born via surrogacy in the United States, an allegation that drew controversy in China, where surrogacy is prohibited. In January 2026, Ge stated on Weibo that she had identified the source of threatening phone calls as two lawyers with connections to Zhang. Amid backlash, Liaoning Television removed Zhang from its Spring Festival Gala lineup, and several brands deleted promotional content featuring Zhang from their social media accounts.

== Filmography ==
=== Film ===
Year	English title	Chinese title	Role	Notes
2007	The Longest Night in Shanghai	夜·上海		Cameo
2008	CJ7	长江七号	Mrs. Yuen	
2008	Shaolin Girl	少林少女	Minmin Ryû	
2008	All About Women	女人不坏	Tang Lu	
2009	Jump	跳出去	Phoenix	
2010	Here Comes Fortune	财神到	Wu Shanshan	
2010	Curse of the Deserted	荒村公寓	Ouyang Xiaozhi	
2011	The Butcher, the Chef and the Swordsman	刀剑笑	Madam Mei	
2012	Qian Xuesen	钱学森	Jiang Ying	
2012	General's Command	将令		Documentary film
2012	White Deer Plain	白鹿原	Tian Xiao'e	
2014	Dearest	亲爱的	Fan Yun	
2015	The Honey Enemy	情敌蜜月	Xia Xiaoyu	
2016	Lost in the Pacific	蒸发太平洋	Ruo Xin	
2016	The Mermaid	美人鱼	Ruo Lan	
2017	Come Across Love	不期而遇	Li Xin	
2017	The Golden Monk	降魔大聖	Jing Jing	
2017	Legend of the Demon Cat	妖猫传	Chun Qin	
2019	The Sexy Guys	最佳男友进化论	Wen Jing	
2025	Invincible Swordsman	笑傲江湖	Dongfang Bubai	

=== Television series ===
Year	English title	Chinese title	Role	Notes
2017	Ice Fantasy Destiny	幻城凡世	Li Luo	
2019	Behind The Scenes	幕后之王	Xin Huimei	Special appearance
2020	Candle in the Tomb: The Lost Caverns	鬼吹灯之龙岭迷路窟	Shirley Yang	
2021	Cracking Case	拆·案	Gong Shuchun	Guest appearance
2022	Mom Wow	加油妈妈	Zhou Nannan	
2022	Candle in the Tomb: Kunlun Tomb	鬼吹灯之昆仑神宫	Shirley Yang	
2023	The Outsider (Chinese Drama)	繁华似锦	Su Mo	Main Role

=== Variety show ===
Year	English title	Chinese title	Role	Notes
2020	Sisters Who Make Waves	乘风破浪的姐姐	Cast member	
2020	Lady Land	姐姐的爱乐之程	Cast member	

== Awards ==
Year	Award	Category	Nominated work	Ref.
2012	8th Chinese American Film Festival	Best Actress	White Deer Plain	
2013	20th Beijing College Student Film Festival	Favorite Actress Award	White Deer Plain	
2013	14th Golden Phoenix Awards	Society Award	White Deer Plain, Qian Xuesen	
2017	29th Hong Kong Society of Cinematographers Awards	Most Charismatic Actress	The Mermaid	
2018	12th Asian Film Awards	Best Supporting Actress	Legend of the Demon Cat	
