= Qian Xuesen =

Chinese rocket scientist (1911–2009)

Qian Xuesen Tsien Hsue-shen
- 钱学森
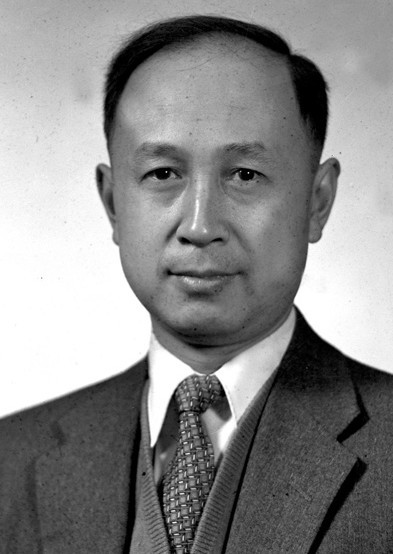
- Qian in the 1950s
- Born: December 11, 1911; Shanghai International Settlement
- Died: October 31, 2009 (aged 97); Beijing, China
- Education: National Chiao Tung University (BS); Massachusetts Institute of Technology (MS); California Institute of Technology (PhD)
- Known for: Co-founder of the Jet Propulsion Laboratory; Founder of engineering cybernetics; Father of Chinese space program
- Spouse: Jiang Ying (m. 1947)
- Children: Qian Yonggang; Qian Yungjen
- Awards: Chinese Academy of Sciences Academician (1957); Distinguished Alumni Award from Caltech (1979); Chinese Academy of Engineering Academician (1994); Two Bombs, One Satellite Merit Medal (1999)
- Scientific career
- Fields: Aerospace engineering; Aeronautics; Engineering cybernetics
- Workplaces: California Institute of Technology (professor); Jet Propulsion Laboratory (co-founder); Massachusetts Institute of Technology (professor); Fifth Academy of the Ministry of National Defense of China (first director); Institute of Mechanics of the Chinese Academy of Sciences (first director); People's Liberation Army Defense Technology Commission (vice director)
- Theses: Study of the turbulent boundary layer (1936); Problems in motion of compressible fluids and reaction propulsion (1939)
- Doctoral advisor: Theodore von Kármán
- Doctoral students: Cheng Che-Min (1952)

Chinese name
- Traditional Chinese: 錢學森
- Simplified Chinese: 钱学森
Transcriptions
Standard Mandarin
- Hanyu Pinyin: Qián Xuésēn
- Wade–Giles: Chʻien^{2} Hsüeh^{2}-sen^{1}
- IPA: [tɕʰjɛ̌n ɕɥě.sə́n]

Signature
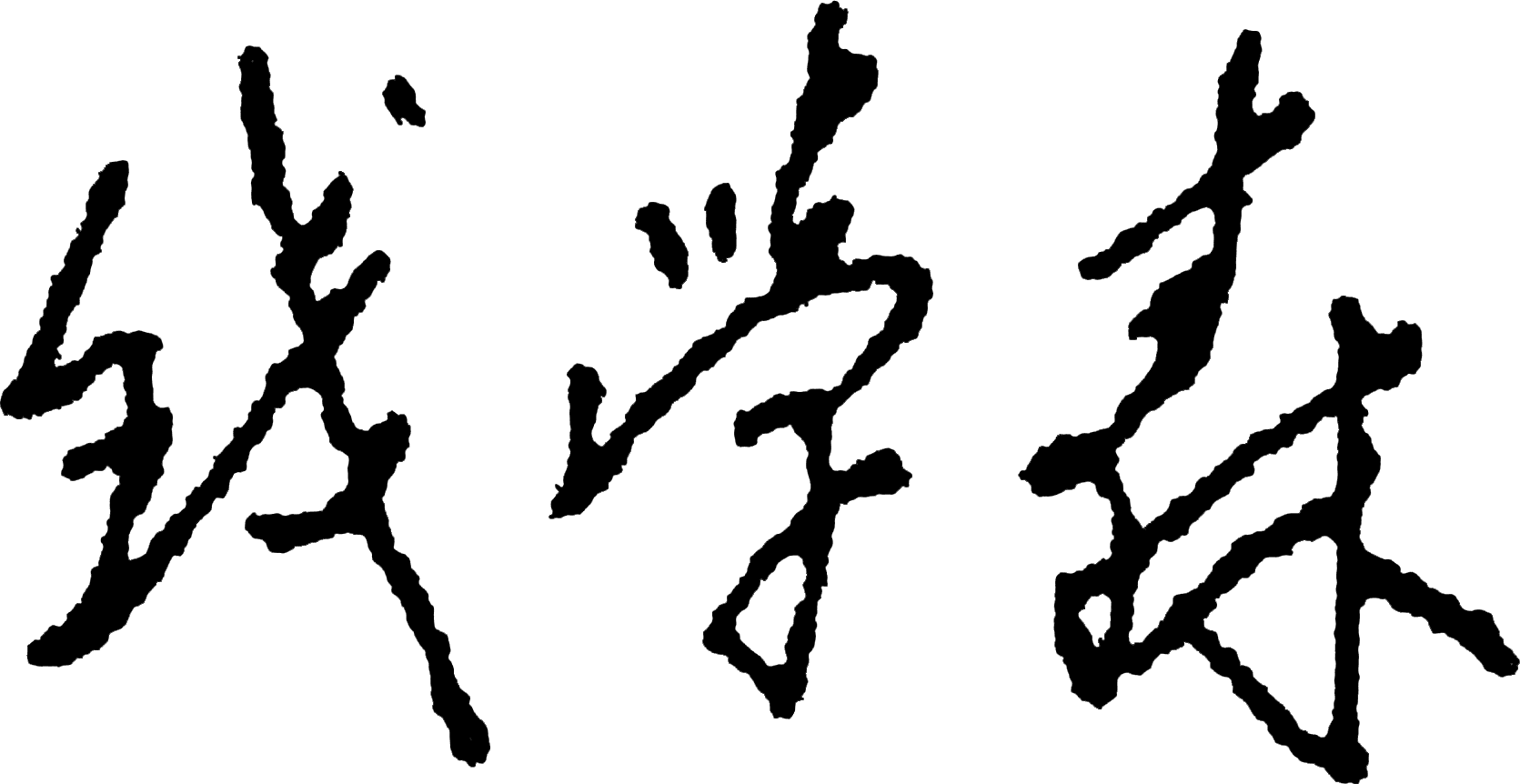

Qian Xuesen (Chinese: 钱学森; December 11, 1911 – October 31, 2009; also spelled as Tsien Hsue-shen) was a Chinese aerospace engineer and cyberneticist who made significant contributions to the field of aerodynamics and established engineering cybernetics. As an international student in the United States, he achieved recognition as one of America's leading experts in rockets and high-speed flight theory prior to being deported back to China in 1955 due to accusations — without evidence — of being a communist sympathizer during the Second Red Scare.

Qian received his undergraduate education in mechanical engineering at National Chiao Tung University in Shanghai in 1934. He traveled to the United States in 1935 and attained a master's degree in aeronautical engineering at the Massachusetts Institute of Technology in 1936. Afterward, he joined Theodore von Kármán's group at the California Institute of Technology, received a doctorate in aeronautics and mathematics there in 1939, and became an associate professor at Caltech in 1943. While at Caltech, he co-founded NASA's Jet Propulsion Laboratory. He was recruited by the United States Department of Defense and the Department of War to serve in various positions, including as an expert consultant with a rank of colonel in 1945. He became an associate professor at MIT in 1946, a full professor at MIT in 1947, and a full professor at Caltech in 1949.

In 1950, United States federal government accused Qian of communist sympathies, and despite protests by his colleagues and without any evidence of the allegations, stripped him of his security clearance. He was given a deferred deportation order by the Immigration and Naturalization Service, and for the following five years, he and his family were subjected to partial house arrest and government surveillance in an effort to gradually make his technical knowledge obsolete. After spending five years under house arrest, he was released in 1955 in exchange for the repatriation of American pilots who had been captured during the Korean War, and left the United States in September 1955 on the American President Lines passenger liner SS President Cleveland, arriving in mainland China via Hong Kong.

Upon his return to China, Qian led development of the Dongfeng ballistic missiles and the Chinese space program. He also played a significant part in the construction and development of China's defense industry, higher education and research system, rocket force, and the University of Science and Technology of China. For his contributions, he became known as the "Father of Chinese Rocketry" and was nicknamed the "King of Rocketry". He is recognized as one of the founding fathers of Two Bombs, One Satellite. In 1957, he was elected an academician of the Chinese Academy of Sciences, and served as a Vice Chairman of the National Committee of the Chinese People's Political Consultative Conference from 1987 to 1998.

Qian was the cousin of engineer Hsue-Chu Tsien, who was involved in the aerospace industries of both China and the United States. He is a cousin of the father of Roger Y. Tsien, the 2008 winner of the Nobel Prize in Chemistry.

== Early life and education ==
Qian was born in the Shanghai International Settlement, with ancestral roots in Lin'an, Hangzhou, in 1911. His parents were Qian Junfu and Zhang Lanjuan. He graduated from the High School Affiliated to Beijing Normal University, and attended Shanghai Jiaotong University. There, he received a bachelor's degree in mechanical engineering with an emphasis on railroad administration in 1934. He interned at Nanchang Air Force Base.

After graduating from college, Qian was admitted to the Boxer Indemnity Scholarship program, enabling him to study in the United States. He left China in August 1935, and went to the Massachusetts Institute of Technology (MIT) for a master's program in mechanical engineering. He received a Master of Science in aeronautical engineering from MIT on December 18, 1936. His master's thesis was titled Study of the turbulent boundary layer.

While at MIT, Qian was influenced by the methods of American engineering education, especially its focus on experimentation. This was in contrast to the contemporary approach practiced by many Chinese scientists, which emphasized theoretical elements rather than direct experience. Qian's experiments included plotting of pitot pressures using mercury-filled manometers.

Theodore von Kármán, Qian's doctoral advisor, described their first meeting:

One day in 1936, he came to me for advice on further graduate studies. This was our first meeting. I looked up to observe a slight, short young man, with a serious look, who answered my questions with unusual precision. I was immediately impressed with the keenness and quickness of his mind, and I suggested that he enroll at Caltech for advanced study ... Tsien agreed. He worked with me on many mathematical problems. I found him to be quite imaginative, with a mathematical aptitude that he combined successfully with a great ability to visualize accurately the physical picture of natural phenomena. Even as a young student, he helped clear up some of my own ideas on several difficult topics. These are gifts which I had not often encountered and Tsien and I became close colleagues.

Kármán made his home a social scene for the aerodynamicists of Pasadena, and Qian was drawn in: "Tsien enjoyed visiting my home, and my sister took to him because of his interesting ideas and straightforward manner."

Shortly after arriving at the California Institute of Technology in 1936, Qian became fascinated with the rocketry ideas of Frank Malina, other students of von Kármán, and their associates, including Jack Parsons. Along with his fellow students, he was involved in rocket-related experiments at the Guggenheim Aeronautical Laboratory at Caltech. Around the university, the dangerous and explosive nature of their work earned them the nickname "Suicide Squad". Qian received a Doctor of Philosophy magna cum laude in aeronautics and mathematics from Caltech on June 9, 1939. His doctoral dissertation was titled Problems in motion of compressible fluids and reaction propulsion.

Qian and von Kármán developed the Kármán-Tsien (Kármán-Qian) rule for estimating compressibility effects of subsonic flow in the field of fluid mechanics.

== Career in the United States ==
In 1943, Qian and two other members of their rocketry group drafted the first document to use the name Jet Propulsion Laboratory. In response to the German V-1 cruise missile and V-2 rocket, he and other important US scientists developed a variety of highly effective missiles that were vital in the closing stages of World War II.

Qian's mentor at Caltech, Theodore von Kármán, invited Qian to join the Air Force Scientific Advisory Group in 1945. In 1945, as an Army colonel with a security clearance, Qian was sent to Germany to investigate laboratories and question German scientists, including Wernher von Braun, and "to recruit German scientists for the American missile program".

Von Kármán wrote of Qian, "At the age of 36, he was an undisputed genius whose work was providing an enormous impetus to advances in high-speed aerodynamics and jet propulsion." During this time, he worked on designing an intercontinental space plane, which would later inspire the X-20 Dyna-Soar, a precursor to the American Space Shuttle.

Qian married Jiang Ying, a famed opera singer and the daughter of Jiang Baili and his wife, Japanese nurse Satô Yato. The elder Jiang was a military strategist and adviser to Kuomintang leader Chiang Kai-shek. The Qians were married on September 14, 1947 in Shanghai, and had two children; their son Qian Yonggang (钱永刚, also known as Yucon Qian) was born in Boston on October 13, 1948, while their daughter Qian Yongzhen (钱永真) was born in early 1950 when the family was residing in Pasadena, California.

Shortly after his wedding, Qian returned to America to take up a teaching position at MIT. Jiang Ying would join him in December 1947. In 1949, with the recommendation of von Kármán, Qian became a Robert H. Goddard Professor of Jet Propulsion at Caltech. He was also appointed the first director of the Daniel and Florence Guggenheim Jet Propulsion Center at Caltech.

In 1947, Qian was granted a permanent resident permit, and in 1949, he applied for naturalization, although he could not obtain citizenship. Years later, his wife Jiang Ying said in an interview with Phoenix Television that Qian did not apply for naturalization at all.

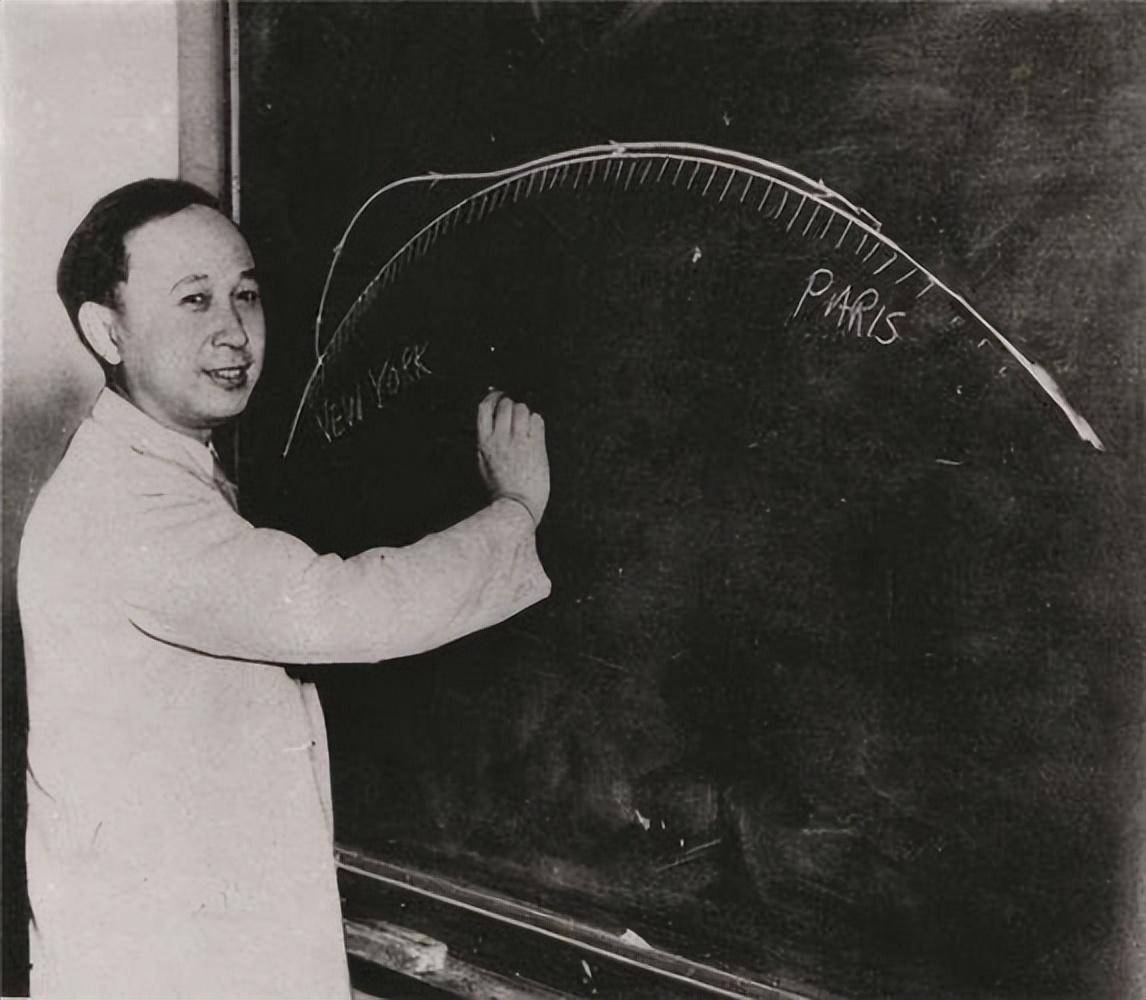
Qian in the early 1940s

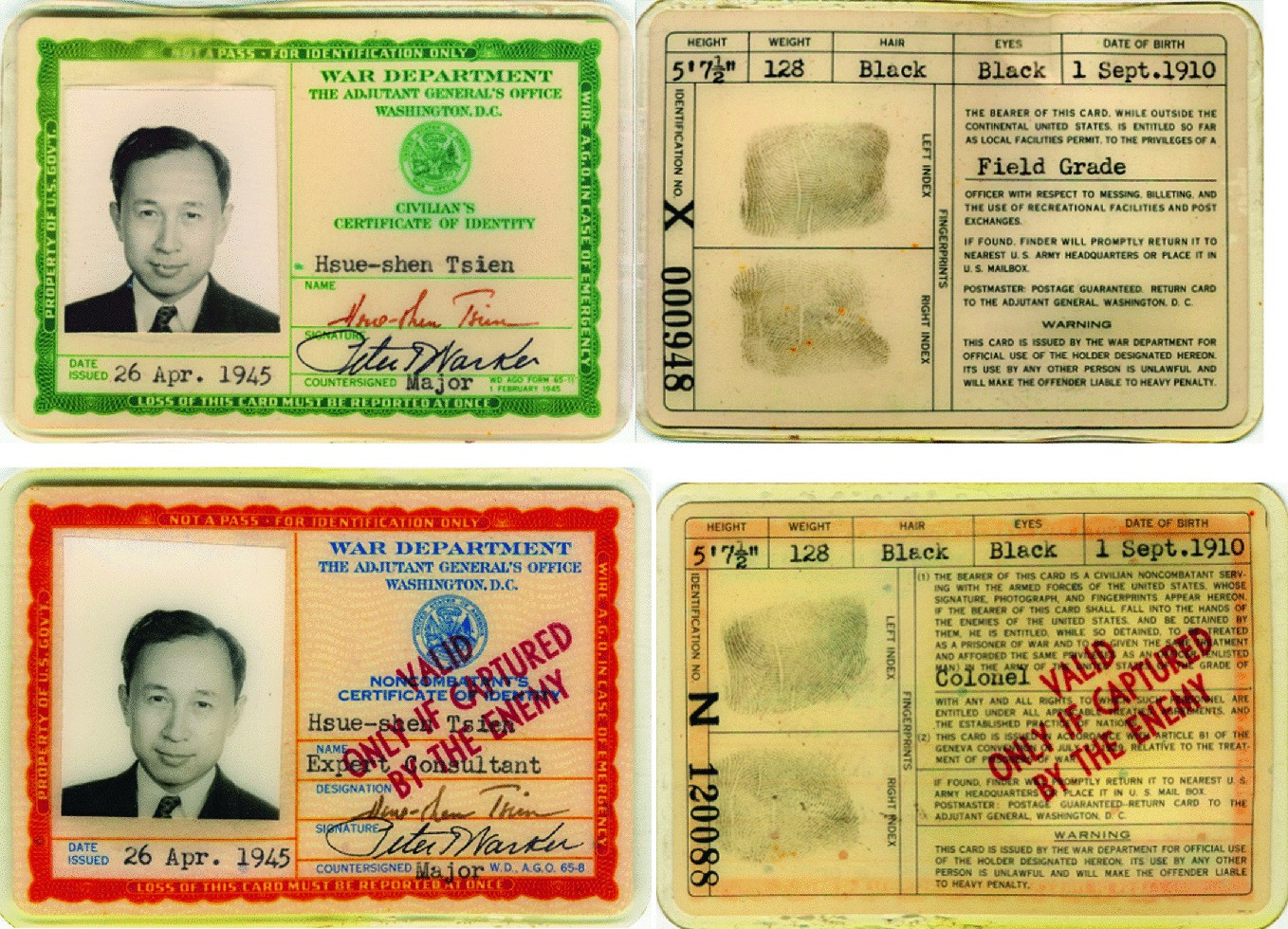
Qian's "general identification document" and "special identification document" issued by the US War Department, 1945

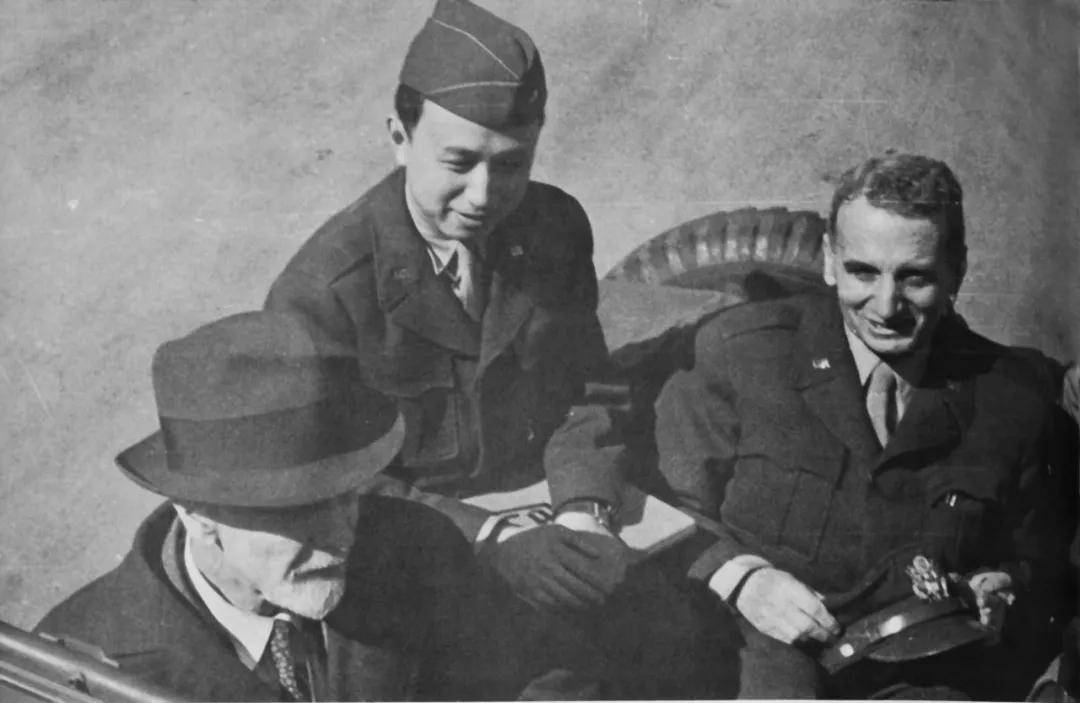
Left to right: Ludwig Prandtl, Qian Xuesen, Theodore von Kármán. Prandtl served Germany during World War II; von Kármán and Qian served the United States; after 1955, Qian served China. Qian's overseas cap displays his temporary United States Army rank of colonel. Prandtl was von Kármán's doctoral adviser; von Kármán, in turn, was Qian's.

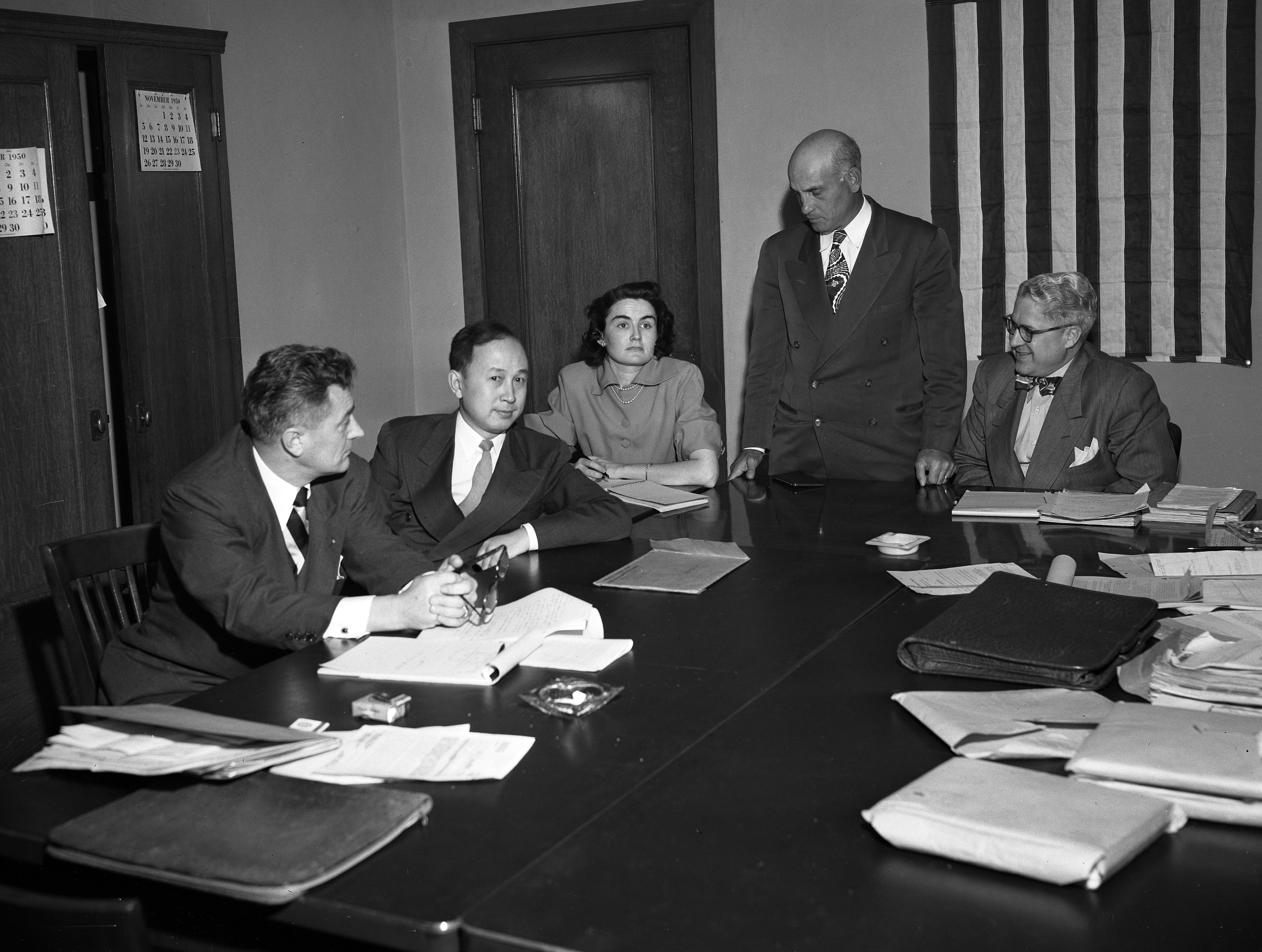
Qian at his deportation hearing, 1950. Others, from left, are Grant B. Cooper, Xuesen's attorney; a hearing reporter, Albert Del Guercio, examining officer, and Ray Waddell, hearing officer.

=== Detention ===
By the early 1940s, U.S. Army Intelligence was already aware of allegations that Qian was a communist, but his security clearance was not suspended until prior to the Korean War. On June 6, 1950, the Army abruptly revoked Qian's security clearance, and he was questioned by the FBI. Despite support from his colleagues and no proof of the allegations, he received a deferred deportation order from the Immigration and Naturalization Service, and for the following five years, he and his family were subjected to partial house arrest and government surveillance intended to undermine his technical expertise. Two weeks later, Qian announced that he would resign from Caltech.

While at Caltech, Qian had secretly attended meetings with J. Robert Oppenheimer's brother Frank Oppenheimer, Jack Parsons, and Frank Malina that were organized by the Russian-born chemist Sidney Weinbaum and called Professional Unit 122 of the Pasadena Communist Party. Weinbaum's trial commenced on August 30 and both Frank Oppenheimer and Parsons testified against him. Weinbaum was convicted of perjury and sentenced to four years. Qian was taken into custody on September 6, 1950, for questioning and for two weeks was detained at Terminal Island, a low-security United States federal prison near the ports of Los Angeles and Long Beach. According to Theodore von Kármán's autobiography, when Qian refused to testify against his old friend Sidney Weinbaum, the FBI decided to launch an investigation on Qian.

In August, Qian spoke with Dan A. Kimball, the United States Under Secretary of the Navy at the time, whom he knew personally. During their conversation, Qian described the FBI visits and the indignity of losing his security clearance, even breaking down in tears. Kimball, determined to help, referred Qian to a lawyer in Washington, DC, to assist him in having his security clearance restored. Qian intended to return to China to resolve family issues and later come back to the United States, but Kimball preferred that Qian remain in the US.

After the packing company moving Qian's belongings to mainland China informed U.S. Customs that some of Qian's documents were marked "Secret" and "Confidential," U.S. officials raided the packing company's warehouse in Pasadena, California. The U.S. Immigration and Naturalization Service issued a warrant for Qian's arrest on August 25. Qian stated that all classified documents were locked in a cabinet in his office, and he gave the keys to a colleague, Clark Blanchard Millikan. In a press statement, Qian clarified, "There are some drawings and logarithm tables, etc., which someone might have mistaken for codes. I wished to take my personal notes, many of which were merely lecture notes, and other material with me for study while I was gone. I most certainly was not attempting to take anything of a secret nature with me or trying to leave the country in any but the accepted manner." The material included "newspaper, magazine, and scientific journal clippings on the U.S. atomic energy program" and news clippings about the trials of those charged with atomic espionage, such as Klaus Fuchs. Subsequent examination of the documents showed they contained no classified material. Various agencies, such as The United States Atomic Energy Commission, noted that the information held by Qian was unclassified information and did not pose a threat to national security. They further explained that the technical papers in Qian's collection were either outdated or authored by him, and that all the documents he had were characteristic of those held by top experts in the fields of aircraft and missile design.

On April 26, 1951, Qian was declared subject to deportation and forbidden from leaving Los Angeles County without permission, effectively placing him under house arrest.

In his five years under surveillance and house arrest, Qian shifted his research focus from theoretical physics to cybernetics. During this time, Qian wrote Engineering Cybernetics, which was published by McGraw Hill in 1954. The book deals with the practice of stabilizing servomechanisms. In its 18 chapters, it considers non-interacting controls of many-variable systems, control design by perturbation theory, and John von Neumann's theory of error control. Ezra Krendel reviewed the book, stating that it is "difficult to overstate the value of Qian's book to those interested in the overall theory of complex control systems". Evidently, Qian's approach is primarily practical, as Krendel notes that for servomechanisms, the "usual linear design criterion of stability is inadequate and other criteria arising from the physics of the problem must be used." The text was quickly translated into multiple languages and became a foundational text on automation. He was awarded the Pendray Aerospace Literature Award by the American Institute of Aeronautics and Astronautics (AIAA) in 1953.

== Return to China ==
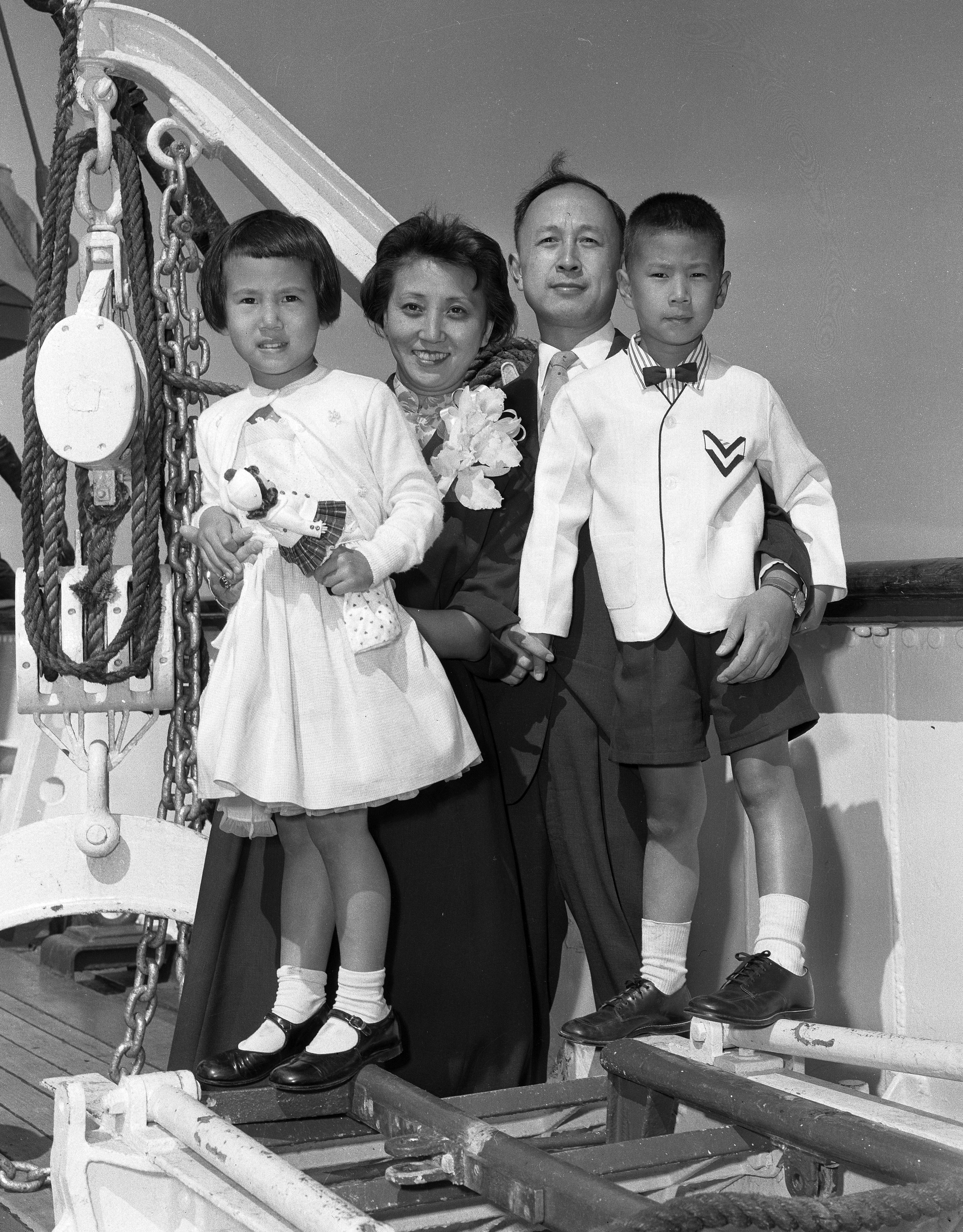
Qian and his family aboard SS President Cleveland before its departure from Los Angeles, 1955

Qian became the subject of five years of secret diplomacy and negotiation between the U.S. and China. During this time, he lived under constant surveillance with the permission to teach without any classified research duties. Qian received support from his colleagues at Caltech during his incarceration, including president Lee DuBridge, who flew to Washington to argue Qian's case. Caltech appointed attorney Grant Cooper to defend Qian.

The travel ban on Qian was lifted on August 4, 1955, and he resigned from Caltech shortly thereafter. With Dwight Eisenhower agreeing, Qian departed from Los Angeles for Hong Kong aboard SS President Cleveland in September 1955 amidst rumors that his release was a swap for 11 U.S. airmen held captive by the People's Republic of China since the end of the Korean War. Qian arrived at Hong Kong on October 8, 1955, and entered mainland China via the Kowloon–Canton Railway later that day.

Under Secretary Kimball, who had tried for several years to keep Qian in the U.S., commented on his treatment: "It was the stupidest thing this country ever did. He was no more a communist than I was, and we forced him to go."

Upon his return, Qian began a successful career in rocket science, boosted by the reputation he garnered for his past achievements as well as Chinese state support for his nuclear research. He led, and eventually became the father of, the Chinese missile program, which constructed the Silkworm missiles, the Dongfeng ballistic missiles and the Long March space rockets.

== Career in China ==
In 1955, Qian returned to China as part of an agreement for the release of American prisoners in China, and he was welcomed as a hero. He soon took charge of the country's missile and satellite programs. In 1956, Qian became the director of the newly established Fifth Institute of the Ministry of National Defense, tasked with ballistic missile and nuclear weapons development.

Qian survived both the Anti-Rightist Campaign of 1957 and the Cultural Revolution by adapting to the shifting political climate in China. For example, in 1958, Qian wrote an article with "scientific" support of the Great Leap Forward.

In 1956, Qian and mathematician Xu Guozhi established China's first operations research group; control theory was one of the group's major research areas. Qian was elected as an academician of the Chinese Academy of Sciences (CAS) in 1957, a lifelong honor granted to Chinese scientists who have made significant advancements in their field. He organized scientific seminars and dedicated some of his time to training successors for his positions. In 1960, the operations research group he had established with Xu became part of the operations research lab at the Mathematics Institute of CAS.

He was heavily involved in the establishment of the University of Science and Technology of China (USTC) in 1958 and served as the Chairman of the Department of Modern Mechanics of the university for a number of years. In his teaching, Qian emphasized the importance of conducting systemic literature reviews before as a preliminary step to embarking on research projects.

In 1960, Qian founded the Combat Research Department at the Fifth Academy of the Ministry of National Defence. It was China's first military operations research centre.

In 1962, Qian recruited Song Jian and Guan Zhaozhi to establish China's first cybernetics laboratory with him.

According to Qian, at a meeting in 1964, "suddenly Chairman Mao asked me if it was possible to shoot down a missile, I replied that it should be possible." In 1966, China formally began to develop a missile interceptor system.

In January 1967, Qian was among key leadership that was ousted from the Seventh Ministry of Machine Building for several months as a result of factional politics during the Cultural Revolution; Zhou Enlai ultimately intervened and reversed the ouster.

In 1969, Qian was one of a group of scientists who spoke with Australian journalist Francis James, describing China's first seven nuclear tests and details of a gaseous diffusion plant near Lanzhou.

Outside of rocketry, Qian had a presence in numerous areas of study. He was among the creators of systematics, and made contributions to science and technology systems, somatic science, engineering science, military science, social science, the natural sciences, geography, philosophy, literature and art, and education. His advancements in the concepts, theories, and methods of the system science field include studying the open complex giant system. Additionally, he helped establish the Chinese school of complexity science. His research advanced the discipline of engineering cybernetics, which emphasized the importance of design principles in practical engineering.

In 1978–1979, Qian and his coauthors published a series of influential research papers contending for the legitimacy and superiority of systems engineering as a method for managing complex entities from factories to states.

In 1979, Qian was awarded Caltech's Distinguished Alumni Award for his achievements. Qian eventually received his award from Caltech, and with the help of his friend Frank Marble, brought it to his home in a widely covered ceremony. Furthermore, in the early 1990s, the filing cabinets containing Qian's research work were offered to him by Caltech.

In 1980, Qian proposed research into noetic science. Qian envisioned it as a discipline which would cover all topics required to develop an understanding of how to formalize human thinking for digital computers and computational systems, drawing together neuropsychology, linguistics, philology, logic, and the development of algorithms.

During the Anti-Spiritual Pollution Campaign, Qian was among those who criticized the science fiction genre, contending that it promoted irrational and unscientific thinking.

From the 1980s onward, Qian had advocated the scientific investigation of traditional Chinese medicine, qigong, and the pseudoscientific concept of "special human body functions". He particularly encouraged scientists to accumulate observational data on qigong so that "future scientific theories could be established".

In Qian's view, China should take a retaliatory nuclear posture as a form of deterrence. He stated in 1986, "We must have a certain number, or what is called a minimum nuclear counterattack capability. Of course, these strategic weapons cannot be eliminated by an adversary, their ability to survive must be high, their reaction must be quick, their penetration capability must be strong."

As vice chairman for the Science and Technology Committee of the Commission for Science, Technology, and Industry (COSTIND) in 1989, Qian contended that Western reports predicting a post-nuclear weapon era following the end of the Cold War were "deceiving people, they are all false." Qian stated, "Even if nuclear weapons were useless, would you ask the United States and the Soviets if it is ok to destroy all of their nuclear weapons? It is not at all the case that nuclear weapons are now useless, their utility is now in deterrence." In a 1992 COSTIND speech, he stated regarding China's nuclear deterrence, "[O]f course, we do not need to do this on a large scale, but if you do not have [these weapons], people want to coerce you and bully you."

After the 1989 Tiananmen Square protests and massacre, he denounced the demonstrators as 'evil elements' and described dissident astrophysicist Fang Lizhi 'the scum of the nation'.

== Later life ==
'Qian Xuesen.' Poster from the series 'Excellent sons and daughters of China', by Li Huiquan, 1990.

Qian retired in 1991 and lived quietly in Beijing, refusing to speak to Westerners.

Qian was invited to visit the U.S. by the AIAA the normalization of relations between the two countries, but he refused the invitation, having wanted a formal apology for his detention. In a reminiscence published in 2002, Marble stated that he believed Qian had "lost faith in the American government" but that he had "always had very warm feelings for the American people." Despite this, Qian approved the decision of both his children, US citizens by birth, to return to the US to study.

The Chinese government had launched its crew space program in 1992, reportedly with some help from Russia. Qian's research was used as the basis for the Long March rocket, which successfully launched the Shenzhou 5 mission in October 2003. The elderly Qian was able to watch China's first crew space mission on television from his hospital bed.

In 2008, he was named Aviation Week & Space Technology Person of the Year. The recognition was not intended as an honor, but is given to the person judged to have the greatest impact on aviation in the past year. That year, China Central Television named Qian as one of the eleven most inspiring people in China.

On October 31, 2009, Qian died at the age of 97 in Beijing from lung illness.

== Legacy in China ==
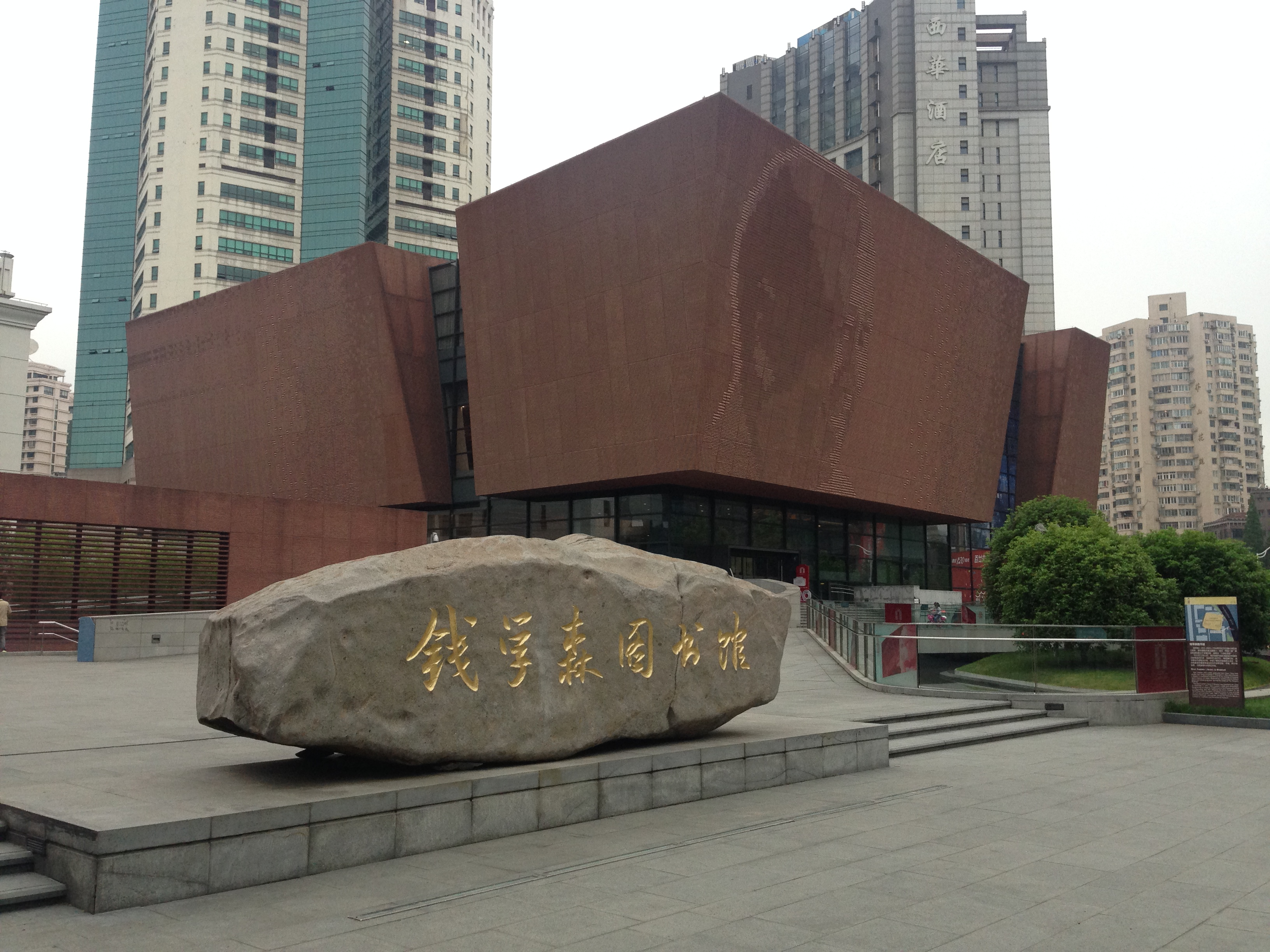
Qian Xuesen Library, Shanghai Jiaotong University

Qian is remembered for his foundational contributions to cybernetics in China and strategic weapons research. Among the contributions for which he is deemed a national science hero are: his foundational Report on Building China's National Defense Aerospace Industry, his leadership of large national defence weapons projects (rocketry and ICBMS), the development of nuclear missile carriers, and initiating and advising the satellite and human spaceflight projects.

Qian originated numerous Chinese terms related to missilery and the space program, including hangtian (航天, space flight) and daodan (导弹, guided missile).

After his retirement in 1991, Qian received numerous honorary titles in China, was highly praised in press and by CCP officials, that was even called "Qian Xuesen fever". Ning Wang describes it as Chinese propaganda campaign "to commend and eulogize" Qian's life. In 1989, public movement "learn from Qian Xuesen" was officially launched by the Commission of Science for National Defence, the Chinese Academy of Sciences, and the Chinese Association of Science and Technology. Qian received honorary titles "State Scientist of Outstanding Contribution", got a "Medal for the First Class Heroic Model", and was called by state leaders "the People's Scientist", "National Hero" and "the Pillar of the State". For his 90th birthday in 2001, celebrations and praising were "comparable with that for Deng Xiaoping during 1992–97".

Wang writes that heroization of Qian was made for several purposes: his "deep engagement in China's national defence programmes", "allegiance to the Party and his well-articulated commitment to state ideology", "rapid emergence of Chinese anti-Americanism", and to create a role model of a "party scientist". Wang writes that in the 1990s, students "claimed to appreciate Qian's scientific accomplishments and the significance of science and technology, taking him as a model and swearing to study hard to be the 'next Qian Xuesen'."

Qian himself tried to avoid publicity, and did not allow writing his biography until he got the title of "State Scientist". During this heroization campaigns, multiple official and unofficial biographies were published. 'Official' biographies were written by Qian's secretaries by CCP requests. Wang Shouyun wrote A Biography of Qian Xuesen in 1991, Tu Yuanji published another book in 2002. Unofficial biographies are based on these two books, and were published by Wang Wenhua, Qi Shuying, and Hu Shihong, among others. All the biographies lack references to source material; Wang describes all the Chinese biographies of Qian as following:

From these multifarious biographies we learn that Qian was a prodigy, a scientific genius from the outset. He was gifted with a golden mind in mathematics and displayed multiple talents at young age – such as memorizing hundred of poems when he was three – and was good at music and painting when growing up. In MIT and Caltech, Qian was brighter than his classmates and surprised professors with the intelligence of Chinese youth. He was particularly good at playing darts in childhood, which presaged his talent in rocketry. ... These narratives create a near-miraculous Qian, with a strong impression that he was not only a missile expert, but an all-rounder; not only a scientific giant, but a built-in communist revolutionary.

A Chinese film production, Hsue-shen Tsien, directed by Zhang Jianya and starring Chen Kun as Qian, was simultaneously released in Asia and North America on December 11, 2011, and on March 2, 2012, it was released in China. Biopic Qian Xuesen, directed by Zhang Jianya with Chen Kun, Zhang Yuqi and Zhang Tielin in the main roles, was released in 2021. A retrofuturistic science fiction film, Qian Xuesen and the Yangtze River Computer, incorporates documentary footage of Qian to tell a fictional story about the creation of a supercomputer "of and for the masses."

== Selected works ==
=== Scientific papers ===
- 1938: (with Theodore von Kármán) "Boundary Layer in Compressible Fluids", Journal of Aeronautical Sciences, April
- 1938: "Supersonic Flow Over an Inclined Body of Revolution", Journal of Aeronautical Sciences, October
- 1938: (with Frank Malina) "Flight analysis of a Sounding Rocket with Special Reference to Propulsion by Successive Impulses", Journal of Aeronautical Sciences, December
- 1939: Two-dimensional subsonic flow of compressible fluids, Journal of Aeronautical Sciences 6(10): 399–407.
- 1939: (with Theodore von Kármán) The buckling of thin cylindrical shells under axial compression, Journal of Aeronautical Sciences 7(2):43 to 50.
- 1943: "Symmetrical Joukowsky Airfoils in shear flow", Quarterly of Applied Mathematics, 1: 130–48.
- 1943: On the Design of the Contraction Cone for a Wind Tunnel, Journal of Aeronautical Sciences, 10(2): 68–70.
- 1945: (with Theodore von Kármán), "Lifting- line Theory for a Wing in Nonuniform Flow," Quarterly of Applied Mathematics, 3: 1–11.
- 1946: "Similarity laws of hypersonic flows", MIT Journal of Mathematics and Physics 25: 247–251, MR 0018074.
- 1946: "Superaerodynamics, Mechanics of Rarefied Gases", Journal of the Aeronautical Sciences, 13 (12)
- 1949: "Rockets and Other Thermal Jets Using Nuclear Energy", in The Science and Engineering of Nuclear Power, Addison-Wesley, Vol. 2.
- 1950: "Instruction and Research at the Daniel and Florence Guggenheim Jet Propulsion Center", Journal of the American Rocket Society, June 1950
- 1951: "Optimum Thrust Programming for a Sounding Rocket" (with Robert C. Evans), Journal of the American Rocket Society 21(5)
- 1952: "The Transfer Functions of Rocket Nozzles", Journal of the American Rocket Society 22(3)
- 1952: "A Similarity Law for Stressing Rapidly Heated Thin-Walled Cylinders" (with C.M.Cheng), Journal of the American Rocket Society 22(3)
- 1952: "Automatic Navigation of a Long Range Rocket Vehicle", (with T.D.Adamson and E.L. Knuth) Journal of the American Rocket Society 22(4)
- 1952: "A Method for Comparing the Performance of Power Plants for Vertical Flight", Journal of the American Rocket Society 22(4)
- 1952: "Serbo-Stabilization of Combustion in Rocket Motors", Journal of the American Rocket Society 22(5)
- 1953: "Physical Mechanics, a New Field in Engineering Science", Journal of the American Rocket Society 23(1)
- 1953: "The Properties of Pure Liquids", Journal of the American Rocket Society 23(1)
- 1953: "Take-Off from Satellite Orbit", Journal of the American Rocket Society 23(4)
- 1956: "The Poincaré-Lighthill-Kuo Method", Advances in Applied Mechanics 4: 281–349, MR 0079929.
- 1958: "The equations of gas dynamics", in Fundamentals of Gas Dynamics v. 3, Princeton University Press, MR 0097212.

=== Monographs ===
- 1954: Engineering Cybernetics. New York: McGraw Hill. April 4, 2020. OCLC 299574775.
  - 1957: Technische Kybernetik (in German). Translated by Kaltenecker, H. Stuttgart: Berliner Union.
- 2007: Hydrodynamics (manuscript facsimile). Jiaotong University Press. 2007. ISBN 978-7-313-04199-9.

== Biographies ==
- Thread of the Silkworm (1996) by Iris Chang

== See also ==
- Chien-Shiung Wu – Chinese-American physicist (1912–1997)
- Ye Qisun – Chinese physicist (1898–1977)
- Guo Yonghuai – Chinese aerospace engineer (1909–1968)
- Hsue-Chu Tsien – Chinese-born American aeronautical and mechanical engineer
- People's Liberation Army Rocket Force – Strategic and tactical missile force of the Chinese People's Liberation Army
- Chinese space program
- China and weapons of mass destruction
  - Project 596 – First Chinese nuclear test, 1964
  - Test No. 6 – Sixth Chinese nuclear test, 1967
- China Aerospace Science and Technology Corporation (formerly known as the Fifth Academy of the Ministry of Defense)
