= Jiang Ying (musician) =

Chinese opera singer and music teacher

- 蒋英
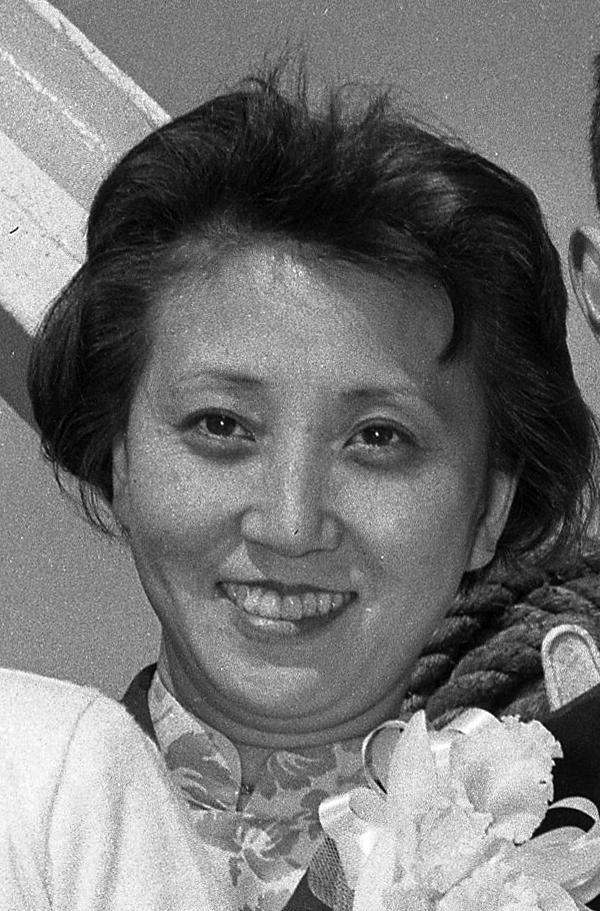
- Jiang Ying in 1955
- Born: 蔣英; August 11, 1919; Haining, Zhejiang, China
- Died: February 5, 2012 (aged 92); Beijing, China
- Occupation: Singer
- Spouse: Qian Xuesen (m. 1947)
- Children: 2

Chinese name
- Traditional Chinese: 蔣英
- Simplified Chinese: 蒋英
Transcriptions
Standard Mandarin
- Hanyu Pinyin: Jiǎng Yīng

Jiang Ying (simplified Chinese: 蒋英; traditional Chinese: 蔣英; August 11, 1919 – February 5, 2012) was a Chinese opera singer and music teacher. She was the wife of Chinese rocket scientist Qian Xuesen, to whom she was married from 1947 until his death in 2009.

== Early life ==
On 11 August 1919, Jiang was born in Haining, Jiaxing, Zhejiang province. Jiang was of Chinese and Japanese descent. She was the third daughter of Jiang Baili, a leading military strategist of Chiang Kai-shek, and his Japanese wife, Satō Yato (佐藤屋登). She was a distant relative of the wuxia novelist Louis Cha.

== Education ==
In 1936 Jiang went to Europe with her father and studied music in Berlin. Jiang graduated from Universität der Künste Berlin in 1941. When World War II broke out in Europe, Jiang had to move and further studied opera in Switzerland. Jiang graduated from Musikhochschule Luzern in 1944.

== Career ==
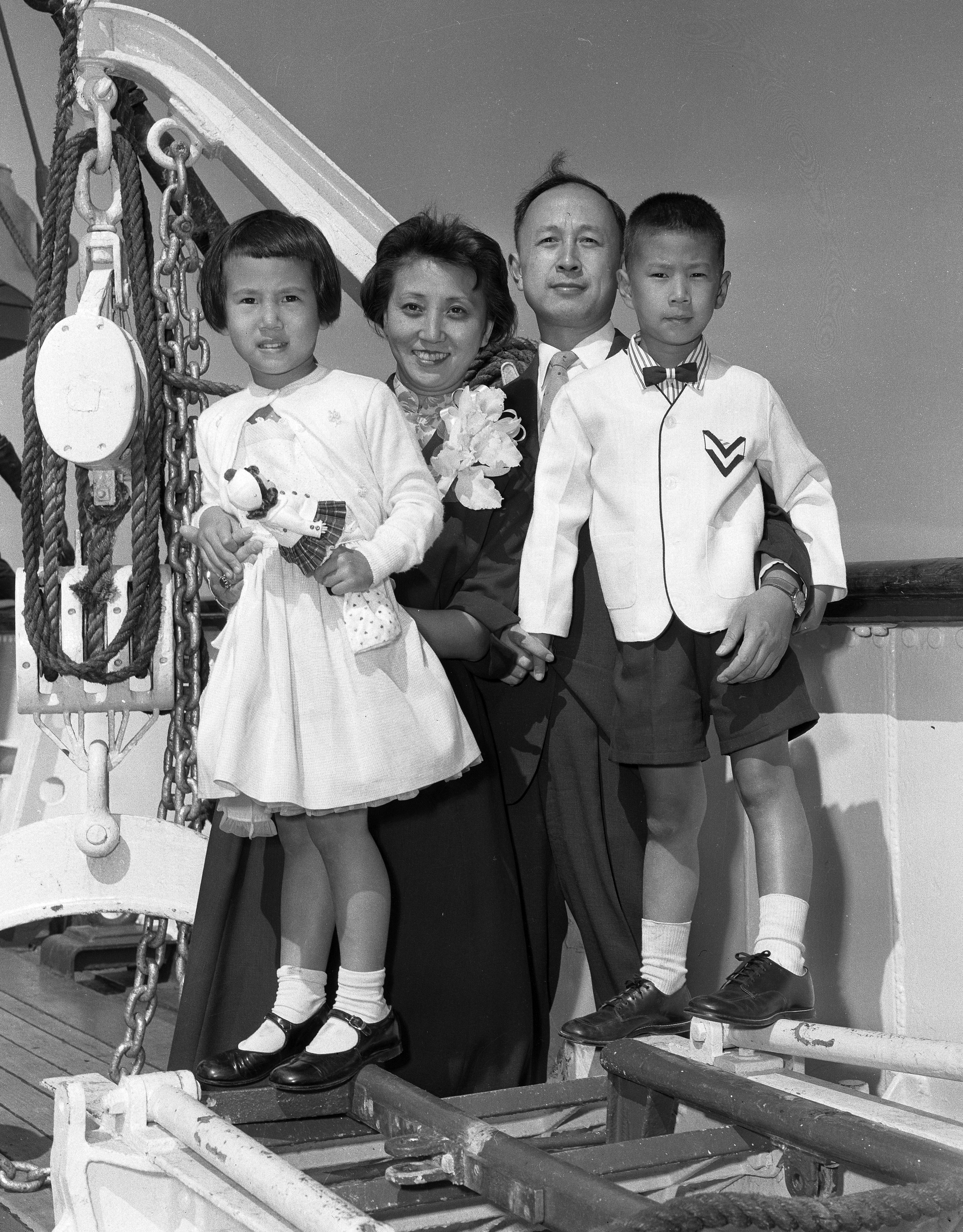
Jiang, Qian and their children aboard SS President Cleveland before its departure from Los Angeles, 1955

Jiang went back to China (at that time the Republic of China). On 31 May 1947, as a Chinese opera singer, Jiang first performed in Shanghai.

In 1947, Jiang moved to the United States. In 1955, when her husband Qian was deported by the United States government, Jiang went to the People's Republic of China together with him. Qian and Jiang entered China through Kowloon, Hong Kong.

Jiang became a professor of music and opera, and head of the department of Western Vocal Music at the Central Conservatory of Music in Beijing.

== Personal ==
In 1947 in Shanghai, Jiang married Qian Xuesen. He was a rocket scientist and engineer who co-founded the Jet Propulsion Laboratory at the California Institute of Technology and later led the space program of the People's Republic of China.

Jiang died on 5 February 2012 in Beijing, China.
