= Zhang Li (director) =

Chinese director and cinematographer

- 张黎
- Born: April 1, 1957 (age 69); Tangshan, Hebei, China
- Education: Beijing Film Academy
- Occupations: Director, cinematographer
- Years active: 1986–present
- Spouse: Liu Bei (m. 2003–2006)
- Children: 1

Chinese name
- Traditional Chinese: 張黎
- Simplified Chinese: 张黎
Transcriptions
Standard Mandarin
- Hanyu Pinyin: Zhāng Lí

Zhang Li (Chinese: 张黎; born 1 April 1957) is a Chinese director and cinematographer best known for his directorial works Towards the Republic (2001), Ming Dynasty in 1566 (2006), Memories In China (2007), The Road We Have Taken (2008), and Young Marshal (2014).

Zhang became a frequent collaborator with director Feng Xiaogang, as cinematographer on his films Sigh (2000), Big Shot's Funeral (2001), A World Without Thieves (2004), and The Banquet (2006).

== Early life and education ==
Zhang was born in Tangshan, Hebei, on April 1, 1957. In 1974, before the end of the Cultural Revolution, he became a sent-down youth in Pingjiang County, Hunan. He was also a back man in Xiaoxiang Film Studio. In 1978, he enrolled at Beijing Film Academy, where he studied alongside Zhang Yimou, Gu Changwei, Chen Kaige, Li Shaohong, and Tian Zhuangzhuang. After graduation, he was assigned to Xiaoxiang Film Studio.

== Career ==
Zhang made his directorial debut Jungle Escape in 1986, but the film has not been released.

In 1989, he directed Fake Hero, a drama film starring Niu Ben, Ji Ling, Feng Shun and Yan Bide.

In 1995, Zhang shot Ye Daying's Red Cherry, for which he received the Best Cinematography nomination at the 16th Golden Rooster Awards.

Zhang's cinematographic career began in 1990 with cinematographer Chi Xiaoning and director Chen Guoxing on their film Roaring Across the Horizon, which earned him a Best Cinematography at the 20th Golden Rooster Awards.

Zhang worked with director Feng Xiaogang in 2000 Sigh, the film stars Zhang Guoli, Liu Bei, Xu Fan and Fu Biao. The film won several awards at the 24th Cairo Film Festival, including Best Screenplay, Best Actor and Best Actress.

In 2001, he directed Towards the Republic, a historical television series starring Wang Bing, Lyu Zhong, Sun Chun, Ma Shaohua and Li Guangjie. At the same year, he served as cinematographer for Big Shot's Funeral, his second collaboration with director Feng Xiaogang. The film stars Ge You, Rosamund Kwan and Donald Sutherland.

In 2004, Zhang was selected as cinematographer for the action drama film A World Without Thieves, his third collaboration with Feng Xiaogang. The film stars Andy Lau, Rene Liu, Ge You, Wang Baoqiang and Li Bingbing. It was released in China on December 5, 2004.

In 2006, he went on to serve as cinematographer for The Banquet. He won the Best Cinematography at the 51st Asia Pacific Film Festival, and received the Best Cinematography nomination at the 43rd Golden Horse Awards. That same year, he directed Ming Dynasty in 1566, the series has a score of 9.6 out of 10. It is one of the highest scores in TV series on Douban.

In 2007, he directed Memories In China, which earned him a Best Full-length TV series at the 4th Seoul International Drama Awards and a Third Prize of the Flying Apsaras Awards.

In 2008, Zhang directed The Road We Have Taken, the series stars Sun Honglei, Huang Zhizhong, Ke Lan, Rolling Zhang, Zhang Zhijian, and Guo Guangping. He won numerous awards, including the Outstanding TV series at 25th China TV Golden Eagle Award, the Best Television Series at the 16th Shanghai TV Festival, the First Prize of the Flying Apsaras Awards, and the Best Director at the 16th Shanghai TV Festival. That same year, he shot the epic war film Red Cliff with Lü Yue. The film was directed by John Woo and stars Tony Leung, Takeshi Kaneshiro, Zhang Fengyi, Chang Chen, Zhao Wei, Hu Jun and Lin Chi-ling.

In 2011, Zhang co-directed with Jackie Chan in 1911. The film stars Winston Chao, Jackie Chan, Li Bingbing and Sun Chun. The rest of the principal cast, including Jaycee Chan, Hu Ge, Yu Shaoqun, Joan Chen, Huang Zhizhong, Jiang Wu, Ning Jing, Jiang Wenli, Mei Ting, Wei Zongwan, Dennis To, Wang Ziwen, Tobgyal, Simon Dutton, and James Lee Guy. The film won the Outstanding Film at the 21st Golden Rooster and Hundred Flowers Film Festival.

In 2013, he directed Forty Nine Days, adapted from Geling Yan's novel The Flowers of War.

In 2014, Zhang directed Young Marshal, a biographical historical drama television series centered on Zhang Xueliang, a warlord in the Republic of China (1912-1949) during the early 20th century. The drama stars Wen Zhang as Zhang Xueliang, alongside Li Xuejian as Zhang's father, Song Jia as Zhang's first wife Yu Fengzhi and Zhang Xinyi as Zhang's second wife Edith Chao.

In 2016, Zhang directed Martial Universe, a TV series adaptation based on the internet novel of the same name by Tiancan Tudou. The series stars Yang Yang, Zhang Tian'ai, Chun Wu, Wang Likun, Ashton Chen, and Ada Liu. The series set to air on Hunan Television and will premiere in 2018.

In 2017, Zhang directed Cao Cao, based on the life of Cao Cao, a warlord and the penultimate Chancellor of the Eastern Han dynasty who rose to great power in the final years of the dynasty. Actor Jiang Wen confirmed that he would portray the male lead.

== Personal life ==
Zhang Li married actress Liu Bei in 2003, the couple have a son, and they divorced after three year of the marriage.

== Filmography ==
=== As cinematographer ===
Cinematographer
Year	English title	Chinese title	Director	Notes
1990	Roaring Across the Horizon	横空出世	Chen Guoxing	with Chi Xiaoning
1995	Red Cherry	红樱桃	Ye Daying	
1996	The Days Without My Comrade	离开雷锋的日子	Ye Daying	Kang Ning and Lei Xianhe
1999	A Time to Remember	红色恋人		
2000	Sigh	一声叹息	Feng Xiaogang	
2001	Big Shot's Funeral	大碗	Feng Xiaogang	
2004	A World Without Thieves	天下无贼	Feng Xiaogang	
2006	The Banquet	夜宴	Feng Xiaogang	
2008	Red Cliff	赤壁	John Woo	with Lü Yue

=== As director ===
Director
Year	English title	Chinese title	Notes
1986	Jungle Escape	逃出罪恶世界	Film
1989	Fake Hero	假大侠	Film
2001	Towards the Republic	走向共和	TV series
2003	Military Secrets	军人机密	TV series
2005	Blades	锦衣卫	TV series
2006	Ming Dynasty in 1566	大明王朝1566	TV series
2007	Memories In China	中国往事	TV series
2008	The Road We Have Taken	人间正道是沧桑	TV series
2009	Confucius	孔子春秋	TV series
2010	The Shengtianmen Gate	圣天门口	TV series
2011	1911	辛亥革命	Film
2012	The Merchants of Qing Dynasty	大清盐商	TV series
2012	Nine Years	九年	TV series
2012	Three Kingdoms	三国·荆州	Film
2013	Forty Nine Days	四十九日·祭	TV series
2014	Young Marshal	少帅	TV series
2016	Martial Universe	武动乾坤	TV series
2017	Cao Cao	曹操	TV series
2020	With You	在一起	TV series
2021	LOSE&WIN	输赢	TV series
2022	Out of Court	庭外	TV series
2024	In the name of the brother	哈尔滨一九四四	TV series

=== As producer ===
Year	English title	Chinese title	Director	Notes
2017	Legend of Sun Ruowei	大明皇妃孙若微传	Zhang Ting	

=== As art director ===
Year	English title	Chinese title	Director	Notes
1999	Yongzheng Dynasty	雍正王朝	Hu Mei	

== Film and TV Awards ==
As director
Year	Nominated work	Award	Result	Notes
2005	Military Secrets	Double-Top Ten Chinese TV series	Won	
2010	The Road We Have Taken	16th Shanghai TV Festival - Best Director	Won	
2016	Young Marshal	22nd Shanghai TV Festival - Best Director	Nominated	

As cinematographer
Year	Nominated work	Award	Result	Notes
1996	Red Cherry	16th Golden Rooster Award for Best Cinematography	Nominated	
2000	Roaring Across the Horizon	20th Golden Rooster Award for Best Cinematography	Won	
2006	The Banquet	43rd Golden Horse Award for Best Cinematography	Nominated	
2006	The Banquet	51st Asia Pacific Film Festival - Best Cinematography	Won	
2007	The Banquet	12th Golden Bauhinia Award for Best Cinematography	Nominated	
2007	The Banquet	26th Golden Rooster Award for Best Cinematography	Nominated	
2009	Red Cliff (Part I)	Hong Kong Film Award for Best Cinematography	Nominated	
2010	Red Cliff (Part II)	Hong Kong Film Award for Best Cinematography	Nominated	
