= Fu Biao =

Chinese actor

- Born: September 27, 1963; Beijing, China
- Died: August 30, 2005 (aged 41); Beijing, China
- Education: China Social University
- Occupation: Actor
- Years active: 1993–2004
- Spouse: Zhang Qiufang (m. 1989)
- Children: 1
- Awards: Beijing College Student Film Festival; Best Actor; 2002 EscortGolden Rooster Awards – Best Supporting Actor; 2001 Escort

Fu Biao (September 27, 1963 – August 30, 2005) was a Chinese actor.

== Biography ==
Fu Biao was born in the family of an army officer on September 27, 1963, in Beijing. After graduating from high school, he entered a film academy in Beijing to learn acting. As a film actor, he acted for the first time in the Shanghai Triad (摇呀摇,摇到外婆桥). From 1997 he acted in several New Year films directed by Feng Xiaogang and became a recognizable actor. He died from liver cancer after having his liver transplanted twice

Fu's funeral was attended by some of the biggest names in Chinese entertainment, including Zhang Yimou, Feng Xiaogang, Xu Fan, Sun Haiying, Lü Liping, Xu Zheng, Tao Hong, Zhang Guoli, Deng Jie, Feng Gong, Han Hong, Liu Zhenyun, Cai Ming, Yu Quan, Hou Yaowen, Alex Man, Zhang Jizhong, Liu Xiao Ling Tong, etc.

== Personal life ==
Fu Biao married actress Zhang Qiufang (张秋芳) in 1989. They portrayed a married couple in several films, including The Dream Factory (1997), Rhapsody of Spring (1998), Happy Times (2000), and several TV series, including Promise of Fate (2002) and Wife (2003) which they co-starred. Zhang Qiufang also had a cameo role in Sorry Baby (1999). In 2006, Zhang published a memoir Yin Ji (印记; "Mark") about her marriage with Fu. The book also included some of Fu's writing after his cancer diagnosis, as well as commemorative essays by family members and some of their celebrity friends.

Fu Biao's son Fu Zi'en (傅子恩), born in 1991, graduated from Beijing Film Academy's Directing Institute.

== Filmography ==
=== Film ===
Year	English title	Chinese title	Role	Notes
1984	North China Red Beans	北国红豆		
1995	Shanghai Triad	搖啊搖，搖到外婆橋	Zheng Sanye	
1997	The Sorrows of Xiaoxinzhuang	小辛庄的烦恼		TV film
1997	The Dream Factory	甲方乙方	Zhang Fugui	
1997	Keep Cool	有话好好说		
1998	Restless		Shen Gang	
1998	Rhapsody of Spring	春天的狂想		
1999	Sorry Baby	没完没了	Ruan Dawei	
2000	Sigh	一声叹息	Liu Dawei	
2000	Happy Times	幸福时光	Little Fu	
2001	Decorating with Lanterns and Festoons	张灯结彩		TV film
2001	Escort	押解的故事	Yu Tai	
2001	Big Shot's Funeral	大腕	himself	cameo
2001	One Hundred...	100个。。。。。。	Uncle Sun	
2001	Family Tie	考试一家亲	Lu Dayi	
2001	Who Cares	谁说我不在乎	teacher	
2002	The Supreme Interest	至高无上		
2004	A World Without Thieves	天下无贼	Manager Liu	

=== TV dramas and sitcoms ===
Year	English title	Chinese title	Role	Notes
1990	Kewang	渴望		
1991	Stories from the Editorial Board	编辑部的故事		sitcom
1993	The Commercial Person	广告人	Wan Rongfa	
1994	Xuanzang of Tang	唐玄奘		
1994	Big Sister in Gold	金装大姐大		
1995	The Red Wall	红墙		
1996	A Metropolitan Full of Love	充满情感的都市	Fan Zhe	
1996	Struggles in an Ancient City	野火春風鬥古城	Gao Ningzi	
1997	A Sentimental Story	一场风花雪月的事	Liu Baohua	
1997	Police Memo	刑警备忘录		
1997	Big Shot Li Delin	大人物李德林	Liu Xifu	
1997	A Free Life	活得潇洒		
1998	Divorce	離婚		
1998	Where Dreams Began	梦开始的地方	Xin Heizi	
1998	Completely Lost	找不着北	Gu Zhiguang	
1998	We Are the Same	你我一样		
1999	We Common Folks	咱老百姓		
1999	Maid in Green	綠衣紅娘	Wang Zibiao	
2000	Palace of Desire	大明宮詞		
2000	The Magical Chinese Detective	中国神探	Gu Liang	
2000	Chaotianmen	朝天门		
2001	Waiting for Your Return	等你归来		
2001	Can't Give Up	欲罢不能		
2001	Daddy Dash Forward	老爸向前冲	He Shan	
2001	Lu Bu and Diaochan	呂布與貂蟬	Wang Yun	
2001	A Family in the Northeast	东北一家人		sitcom
2002	A Laughing Stock	贻笑大方	Wu Liwei	
2002	Promises of Fate	命运的承诺		
2002	Not-So-Distant Neighbours	相邻不远		
2003	The Return to Shanghai Bund	重返上海灘	Du Bang	
2003	Qingyi	青衣		
2003	Unexpected	出乎意料		
2003	The Thirteenth Princess	十三格格	Li Lianying	
2003	Rescuing Juvenile Offenders	拯救少年犯		
2003	Swordsmen of the Passes	關中刀客		
2003	Debt of Gratitude	恩情	Tao Guodong	
2004	The Truth Behind	真相的背后	Lu Changming	
2004	Fate in Tears and Laughter	啼笑因緣	Liu Dezhu	
2004	Homely Man	居家男人	Gao Baosheng	
2004	The Tycoon	天下奇謀	Tong Erzhuo	
2004	Zhuo-er's Story	卓尔的故事	Mr. Qiao	
2004	Wife	妻子	Xie Jiashu	
2004	Romantic Life	血色浪漫		
2005	The Execution of Chen Shimei	新鍘美案	Guo Zheng	
2005	The Incorruptible Official	大清官	Fukang	

== Awards and nominations ==
Year	#	Award	Category	Work	Result
2000	20th	Golden Rooster Awards	Best Supporting Actor	Sorry Baby	Nominated
2001	21st	Golden Rooster Awards	Best Supporting Actor	Escort	Won
2002	9th	Beijing College Student Film Festival	Best Actor	Escort	Won
2002	2nd	Chinese Film Media Awards	Best Actor	Escort	Nominated
