= 6th Beijing College Student Film Festival =

Film festival edition

The 6th Beijing College Student Film Festival (simplified Chinese: 第六届北京大学生电影节; traditional Chinese: 第六屆北京大學生電影節) was held from 17 April to 2 May 1999 in Beijing, China. Be There or Be Square was the biggest winner, receiving three awards, including Favorite Actress Award, Favorite Film, and Best Visual Effects Award.

== Awards ==
- Best Film Award: Not One Less
- Best Director Award: Teng Wenji for Rhapsody of Spring
- Best Actor Award: Teng Rujun for Postmen in the Mountains
- Best Actress Award: Tao Hong for A Beautiful New World
- Favorite Actor Award: Feng Gong for A Tree in House
- Favorite Actress Award: Xu Fan for Be There or Be Square
- Favorite Film: Be There or Be Square
- Best Visual Effects Award: Be There or Be Square
- Committee Special Award: Autumn Scenery in Hometown, Huishi Sanjiang
- Special Jury Award: Rhapsody of Spring
- Best First Film Award: Li Hong for Fly Away Home
- Special Education Award: Be Without You

== See also ==
- Beijing College Student Film Festival
- 1999 in film
- List of film festivals
- Golden Rooster Awards
