= If You Are the One =

If You Are the One (Chinese: 非诚勿扰) may refer to:

- If You Are the One (film), a 2008 Chinese romantic comedy
- If You Are the One (game show), a Chinese dating show that first aired in 2010

== See also ==
- If You Are the One 2, 2010 sequel to the 2008 film
