= Ying Ge Li Shi =

Ying Ge Li Shi may refer to:

- English (novel), a 2004 Chinese novel by Wang Gang
- English (2018 film), an upcoming Chinese film based on the novel

== See also ==
- English (disambiguation)
- Chinglish, Chinese-style English
