= Sigh (film) =

- poster
- Traditional Chinese: 一聲嘆息
- Simplified Chinese: 一声叹息
- Hanyu Pinyin: Yī shēng tànxi
- Directed by: Feng Xiaogang
- Written by: Wang Shuo
- Produced by: Wang Zhongjun
- Starring: Zhang Guoli; Liu Bei; Xu Fan; Fu Biao
- Cinematography: Zhang Li
- Edited by: Zhou Ying
- Music by: Zhao Jiping; Zhao Ling
- Release date: 2000
- Running time: 111 min
- Country: China
- Language: Mandarin

Sigh is a 2000 Chinese drama film directed by Feng Xiaogang, written by Wang Shuo, starring Zhang Guoli, Liu Bei, Xu Fan and Fu Biao. Like most of Feng's films, the film is set mostly in Beijing.

== Plot ==
Liang Yazhou (Zhang) is a successful, middle-aged TV screenwriter from Beijing. While in Hainan working on a new script, Liu Dawei (Fu) assigns young and beautiful Li Xiaodan (Liu) to him as an assistant. Yazhou and Xiaodan are mutually attracted to each other, but Yazhou is already married to Song Xiaoying (Xu), with whom he has a daughter. To break off the connection, he changes his plans and returns to Beijing. However, as soon as Yazhou and Xiaoying return to Beijing, they begin having an affair.

When Xiaoying finds out about Yazhou's affair, she is furious and initially demands a divorce. Relations between Yazhou and Xiaoying become extremely strained. They separate, and Xiaoying eventually accepts Yazhou's affair for the sake of their young daughter Yueyue. Despite Xiaoying's tolerance, Yazhou remains caught between the two women, on one hand being spoiled by Xiaodan and, on the other, being an attentive father in front of Xiaoying and Yueyue. Even with Xiaodan demanding marriage, Yazhou finds himself unable to divorce his wife, due to the harmful impact their separation has already had on Yueyue.

Xiaoying immerses herself in renovating the home she and Yazhou purchased before their fall out. When she injures her back after falling off a ladder, Yazhou is forced to leave Xiaodan to care for Xiaoying. He finally comes to appreciate how much his wife did for him - cooking, cleaning, taking care of their daughter, attending to his needs - so that he could write without distraction. During this time, Yazhou and Xiaodan rarely see each other, and Yazhou and Xiaoying appear to have fully repaired their relationship.

On Yazhou's 42nd birthday, Xiaodan goes to his home with a gift, only to be spotted by Xiaoying. Xiaoying insists that she come inside, saying that they should temporarily put aside their hostility, and celebrate Yazhou's birthday. She reminisces about her relationship with her husband, telling Xiaodan about how they met and fell in love. After this visit, Yazhou and Xiaodan end their affair.

The film ends with Yazhou and his family happily playing on a beach in Hainan. He receives a mysterious phone call. The last shot is of his surprised face when he turns around and presumably sees someone.

== Cast ==
- Zhang Guoli as Liang Yazhou (梁亚洲)
- Liu Bei as Li Xiaodan (李小丹)
- Xu Fan as Song Xiaoying (宋晓英)
- Fu Biao as Liu Dawei (刘大为)
