= Wang Gang (writer) =

Chinese writer

- Born: August 24, 1960 (age 66); Shihezi, Xinjiang, China
- Education: Northwest University
- Writing career
- Language: Chinese
- Years active: 1983–present

Chinese name
- Traditional Chinese: 王剛
- Simplified Chinese: 王刚
Transcriptions
Standard Mandarin
- Hanyu Pinyin: Wáng Gāng

Wang Gang (born 24 August 1960) is a Chinese writer, probably best known for co-writing the screenplays for Feng Xiaogang's The Dream Factory (1997) and A World Without Thieves (2004), both huge box office hits in China. He also wrote novels, one of which has been translated into English.

== Works translated into English ==
- English (英格力士). Translated by Martin Merz; Jane Weizhen Pan. Viking Press. 2009 [2004]. ISBN 978-0-670-02059-1.

== Filmography ==
Year	English title	Chinese title	Director	Notes
1997	Behind the Moon	月亮背后	Feng Xiaogang	based on his novel of the same name
1997	The Dream Factory	甲方乙方	Feng Xiaogang	based on the novella You Aren't a Layman (你不是一个俗人) by Wang Shuo
2004	A World Without Thieves	天下无贼	Feng Xiaogang	based on a novelette by Zhao Benfu, co-wrote with Feng, Lin Lisheng, and Chang Chia-lu

== Film awards ==
Year	#	Award	Category	Film	Result
2005	42nd	Golden Horse Awards	Best Adapted Screenplay	A World Without Thieves	Won
