= If You Are the One 3 =

If You are the One 3
- Theatrical release poster
- Simplified Chinese: 非诚勿扰3
- Traditional Chinese: 非誠勿擾3
- Hanyu Pinyin: Fēichéng Wùrǎo 3
- Directed by: Feng Xiaogang
- Written by: Feng Xiaogang; Zhang Yaozhi
- Starring: Ge You; Shu Qi
- Production companies: China Film Creative (Beijing) Film Co., Ltd. Zhejiang Dongyang Meila Media Co., Ltd. China Film Co., Ltd. Huayi Brothers; Xinjiang Bona Runze Cultural Media Co., Ltd.
- Distributed by: China Film Co., Ltd. Huayi Brothers
- Release date: 30 December 2023
- Running time: 119 minutes
- Country: China
- Language: Mandarin
- Box office: US$14.2 million

If You are the One III (Chinese: 非诚勿扰3) is a 2023 Chinese science fiction romantic comedy film co-written and directed by Feng Xiaogang. It stars Ge You and Shu Qi. The film is the third installment in the If You are the One film series and the sequel to If You Are the One 2 (2010). The film tells the love story of Qin Fen and Liang Xiaoxiao in 2031. The film premiered in China on 30 December 2023.

== Plot ==
Qin Fen and Xiaoxiao finally get together, but before they can even finish their honeymoon, Xiaoxiao joins a global environmental protection organization and leaves, disappearing for ten years without returning.

By 2031, Lao Fan has developed highly realistic artificial intelligence humanoids. To ease Qin Fen's longing, Lao Fan customizes an AI version of Xiaoxiao for him. As Qin Fen spends time with this AI Xiaoxiao, he develops ambiguous feelings toward her.

After a conversation with his old friend Mang Guo, Qin Fen begins to question whether his deep feelings are truly worthwhile. Just then, the real Xiaoxiao unexpectedly returns.

== Cast ==
- Ge You as Qin Fen
- Shu Qi as Liang Xiaoxiao
- Fan Wei as Lao Fan
- Li Chengru as Da Dao
- Yue Yunpeng as Cheng Ru
- Chang Yuan as Jian Guo
- Yao Chen as Mang Guo
- Guan Xiaotong as Chuan Chuan
- Esther Yu as Zhu Di
- Wu Yicong as Uncle Wu

== Soundtrack ==
No.	Title	Lyrics	Music	Singer(s)	Length
1.	"If You are the One (非诚勿扰)" (Opening theme)	Guo Dongnan	Tang Hanxiao	Shan Yichun
2.	"Missing (思信)" (Ending theme)	Liang Mang	Ma Shangyou	Mao Buyi

== Release ==
The film was released on 30 December 2023, in China.

== Reception ==
Douban, the influential Chinese film reviews website, gave the film 5.4 out of 10.
