= Chinese New Year film =

Popular tradition in Asia, especially Hong Kong

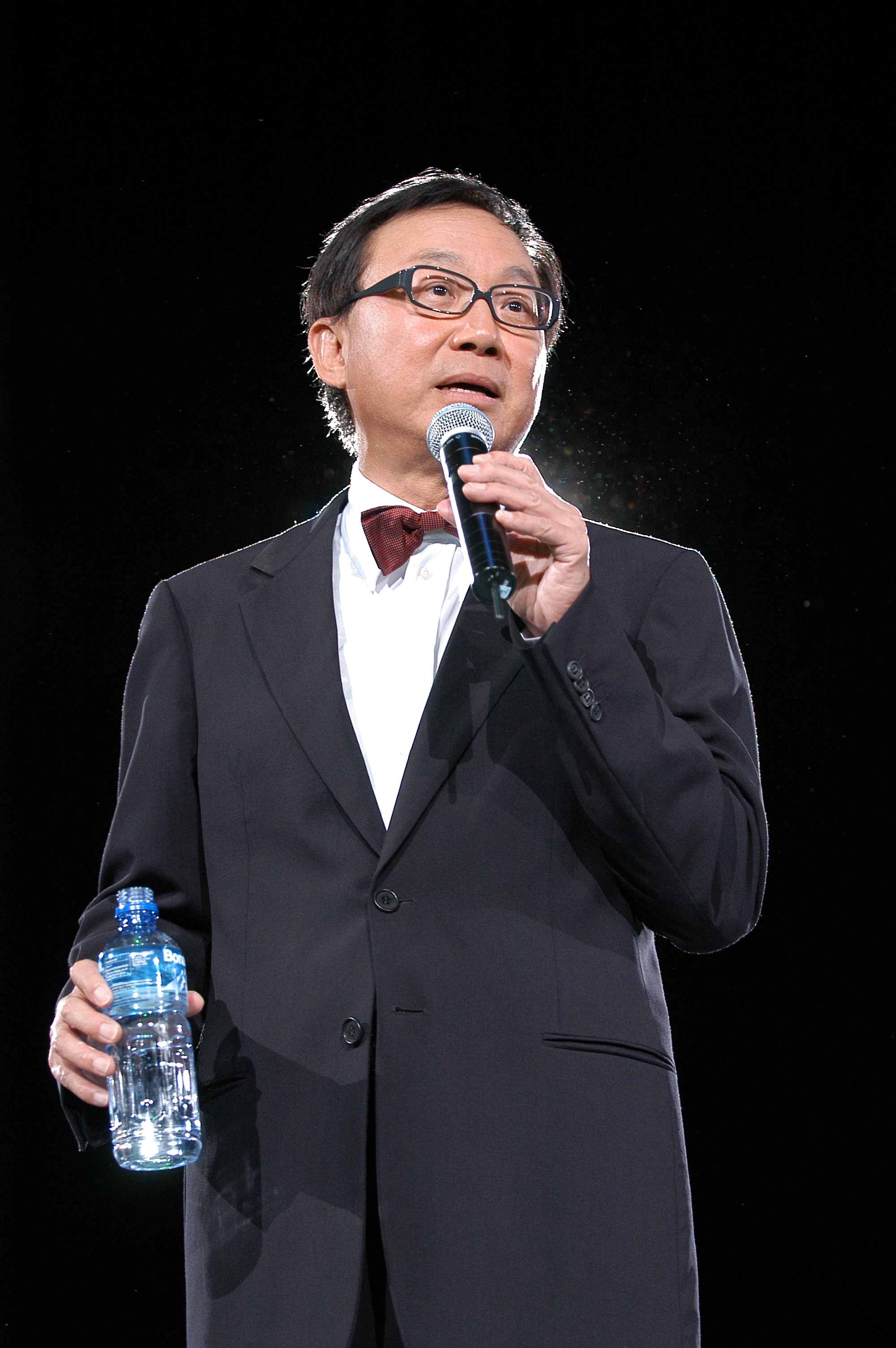
Director Michael Hui (pictured 2005), whose 1981 film Security Unlimited is credited with establishing the Chinese New Year film as a distinct genre

A Chinese New Year film (simplified Chinese: 贺岁片; traditional Chinese: 賀歲片, Mandarin: hèsuìpiān, Cantonese: ho^{6}seoi^{3}pin^{3}) is a type of film released during the period surrounding the Chinese New Year. They are typically lighthearted, mass-market films spanning genres such as comedy, action, romance, and fantasy. They emerged as a genre in the early 1980s in Hong Kong, beginning with Security Unlimited (1981), and were popularized in China by Feng Xiaogang through his comedic collaborations with Ge You in the late 1990s.

== Overview ==
Folklorists believe "New Year's Movie Culture" can be traced back to the operatic players in the late Qing dynasty. During the Chinese New Year holidays, the stage boss gathered the most popular actors from various troupes and lete them perform repertories.

The Chinese New Year films were first made in Hong Kong. Although the tradition is only about 30 years old, it has become a classic and now provides Hong Kongers with a sense of continuity and belonging. Film studios promote their new movies, with plans to roll out more advertising in mainland China in the coming year. The common themes of these films are the realities, the festivities, and the customs associated with the season.

In 1937 the first Chinese New Year film premiered in Hong Kong; the movie, titled Bloom and Prosper (花開富貴), broke all box office records. Because of the film's success, more followed in the 1950s and '60s, such as Marriage Between Poorness and Richness (萬事勝意) in 1963, Fortune (招財進寶) in 1960, Happiness at the Door (喜臨門) in 1958, Home Sweet Home (歡喜夫妻) in 1961, and May Luck be with You (一帆風順) in 1965.

In the 1970s the Kung Fu genre reached its height, coinciding with Hong Kong's economic boom. The film The 36th Chamber of Shaolin, received universal acclaim and is widely considered to be one of the greatest Kung fu films made until then; it is a highly influential film of the genre. Because of such success, kung fu films have become an important product of Hong Kong cinema. Even Jackie Chan, a famous actor known for his martial art movies, has the habit of watching a Chinese New Year film every year.

Security Unlimited, a 1981 comedy directed by the Hui Brothers, is now considered the first modern Chinese New Year film in Hong Kong. The next year, Mad Mission ushered in a new epoch in movie star history; it is now recognized by audiences in other countries and regarded as one of the most successful movies among the Hui Brothers' comedies.

From the 1980s and the 1990s the city's economic boom helped create its flourishing film industry. Movies made during this time include the "Aces Go Places" series, "All's Well, Ends Well" series, and others.

In 1995 the Hong Kong film Rumble in the Bronx was introduced to mainland China, marking the first time a movie was promoted and distributed under the banner of a “New Year film” (hesuipian) there. In 1997, Feng Xiaogang’s The Dream Factory became the first New Year film from mainland China. Since then, Feng has been a staple of the genre and dominating the New Year film market in mainland China.

After 2002 more Chinese directors, such as Zhang Yimou and Chen Kaige, entered the year-end film market. As the Chinese film industry grew rapidly in the new century, the New Year film season gained increased attention, becoming one of the most productive periods in China’s film calendar. The genre also evolved from primarily comedic New Year films to a more diverse range of offerings.

== List of Chinese new year films ==
The following list only includes films released in their origin countries during the Chinese new year period.

=== China mainland ===
- The Dream Factory (1997)
- Sorry Baby (1999)
- Happy Times (2000)
- Pegasus (2019)
- Peppa Pig Celebrates Chinese New Year (2019)
- The Wandering Earth (2019)
- Detective Chinatown 3 (2021)
- Hi, Mom (2021)
- New Gods: Nezha Reborn (2021)
- The Battle at Lake Changjin II (2022)
- Deep Sea (2023)
- Full River Red (2023)
- Hidden Blade (2023)
- The Wandering Earth 2 (2023)
- Pegasus 2 (2024)
- YOLO (2024)
- Creation of the Gods II: Demon Force (2025)
- Detective Chinatown 1900 (2025)
- Legends of the Condor Heroes: The Gallants (2025)
- Ne Zha 2 (2025)
- Pegasus 3 (2026)

=== Hong Kong ===
- Security Unlimited (1981)
- Aces Go Places (1982)
- It's a Mad, Mad, Mad World (1987)
- The Eighth Happiness (1988)
- Once a Thief (1991)
- The Eagle Shooting Heroes (1993)
- The Heroic Trio (1993)
- A Chinese Odyssey (1995)
- Rumble in the Bronx (1995)
- Forbidden City Cop (1996)
- All's Well, Ends Well (1997)
- Who Am I? (1998)
- Young and Dangerous 5 (1998)
- Gorgeous (1999)
- Chinese Odyssey 2002 (2002)
- Fat Choi Spirit (2002)
- CJ7 (2008)
- 72 Tenants of Prosperity (2010)
- I Love Hong Kong (2011)
- The Man from Macau III (2014)
- Rob N Roll (2024)
- Table for Six 2 (2024)

=== Taiwan ===
- The Green Hornet (1994)
- David Loman (2013)
- Twa-Tiu-Tiann (2014)
- The Wonderful Wedding (2015)

=== Malaysia ===
- Great Day (2011)
- Kongsi Raya (2022)
- Nasi Lemak 1.0 (2022)
- Small Town Heroes (2022)
