= Wild Beast =

Wild Beast may refer to:

- Wild Beast (roller coaster), a wooden roller coaster at Canada's Wonderland, Vaughan, Ontario, Canada
- Wild Beast (novel), a 1991 novel by Wang Shuo

== See also ==
- Wildebeest, a bovidae native of Africa
- Wildlife, undomesticated organisms that grow or live wild in an area without being introduced by humans
