= Escort (2001 film) =

2001 film by Qi Xing

- Film poster
- Chinese: 押解的故事
- Literal meaning: The Story of Escorting
- Hanyu Pinyin: Yājiè de Gùshì
- Directed by: Qi Xing
- Written by: Wang Liang; Qi Xing
- Produced by: Teng Wenji
- Starring: Ge Zhijun; Fu Biao; Li Zhanhe; Li Yunjuan
- Cinematography: Wang Dong
- Edited by: Ma Lei
- Music by: Xiang Min
- Production companies: China Film Group Corp.; Beijing Film Studio; China Movie Channel
- Release date: October 1, 2001
- Running time: 93 minutes (international); 89 minutes (domestic)
- Country: China
- Language: Mandarin

Escort is a 2001 Chinese black comedy film directed by Qi Xing, starring Ge Zhijun and Li Zhanhe as two plainclothes police officers trying to escort an especially obedient criminal (Fu Biao) out of an impoverished and desolate area in Shaanxi. The film marks Qi's directorial debut.

== Characters ==
- Fu Biao as Yu Tai, a swindler who hasn't been home for many years. Too homesick and too poor to leave the area by himself, he happily follows the 2 police officers so that they can take him home.
- Ge Zhijun as Old Li, an old officer about to retire. A widower, he worries about his future and his daughter's future.
- Li Zhanhe as Zhang Lei, a young officer. He is a little frustrated with the trip as he really misses his wife.
- Li Yunjuan as a hard-working, kind and pleasant landlady. Widowed, she has a teenage son named Ningning (Xu Yang).

== Reception ==
Internationally, the film was shown at the 2006 Thessaloniki International Film Festival after Fu Biao's death. It was also screened at the 2002 Far East Film Festival in Italy.

Shelly Kraicer characterizes the film as having "rough and ready shooting style", "solid scripting and unhurried pace", as well as "superb comic performances".

== Awards and nominations ==
- 2001 21st Golden Rooster Awards
  - Won — Best Actor (Ge Zhijun)
  - Won — Best Supporting Actor (Fu Biao)
  - Won — Best Directorial Debut (Qi Xing)
  - Nominated — Best Writing (Wang Liang & Qi Xing)
- 2002 2nd Chinese Film Media Awards
  - Nominated — Best Actor (Ge Zhijun)
  - Nominated — Best Actor (Fu Biao)
- 2002 9th Beijing College Student Film Festival
  - Won — Best Actor (Fu Biao)
