= If You Are the One (film) =

2008 film by Feng Xiaogang

- Theatrical release poster
- Simplified Chinese: 非诚勿扰
- Directed by: Feng Xiaogang
- Written by: Feng Xiaogang
- Story by: Feng Xiaogang; Chen Kuo-fu
- Produced by: Chen Kuo-fu; James Wang; Zhang Dajun; Shirley Lau
- Starring: Ge You; Shu Qi
- Cinematography: Lü Yue
- Edited by: Xiao Yang; Liu Miaomiao
- Music by: Liu Qin; Liu Rui
- Production companies: Huayi Brothers; Media Asia Films
- Distributed by: Huayi Brothers; Media Asia Distribution
- Release date: December 18, 2008 (China)
- Running time: 128 minutes
- Country: China
- Language: Mandarin
- Box office: $53.7 million

If You Are the One (simplified Chinese: 非诚勿扰; traditional Chinese: 非誠勿擾; pinyin: Fēichéng Wùrǎo; lit. 'if insincere', 'do not disturb') is a 2008 Chinese romantic comedy film written and directed by Feng Xiaogang and starring Ge You and Shu Qi. The film was successful at the Chinese box office, earning over ¥364 million (US$53.7 million) at the box office and becoming one of Feng's top-grossing films to date.

Two sequels have been released: If You Are the One 2 (2010) and If You Are the One 3 (2023).

== Plot ==
Qin Fen, in his late forties, returns to China after many years overseas. He did not earn any degree while he was overseas but he is good at convincing others. After selling an "innovative invention" to a high-profile (but foolish) angel investor, Qin becomes a multimillionaire and with his new fortune, he decides to put an end to his bachelor life, advertising online for potential marriage partners, to apply "if you are the one", that is, only if they are sincere.

He encounters various candidates, from a homosexual former workmate, a cemetery saleswoman with a thick southern-Chinese accent, a pathological amnesiac, an ethnic minority pecking hen, an asexual widow, an expectant single mother, and a stock-holding trader. Eventually, he crosses paths with air stewardess Liang Xiaoxiao, who previously had a painful love affair with a married man (Fong). Qin strikes up an unexpected friendship with Liang, and they start dating, under the agreement that Liang's heart will always be with her previous lover. Qin sets out to woo her completely, and their business-like arrangement eventually blossoms into love during a trip to Hokkaido.

== Cast ==
- Ge You as Qin Fen
- Shu Qi as Liang Xiaoxiao
- Alex Fong as Liang Xiaoxiao's lover
- Vivian Hsu as Taiwanese rich girl
- Fan Wei as Angel investor
- Feng Yuanzheng as Homosexual man
- Hu Ke as Stock trader
- Gong Xinliang as Angel investor's assistant
- Luo Haiqiong as Miao girl

== Production ==
If You Are the One was filmed in locations throughout Beijing and Hangzhou in China, and Hokkaido in Japan from August, 2008 to October, 2008.

== Critical reception ==
The film was a box office hit in the mainland and received largely positive reviews.

Variety states: "After taking a left turn into big-budgeters The Banquet and Assembly, Feng Xiaogang returns to the kind of film that made his name -- ironic observational comedies," and described the film as a "beautifully observed relationship movie is overly discursive in its second half but always watchable, thanks to terrific chemistry between Feng regular Ge You and Taiwanese actress Shu Qi."

The Hollywood Reporter states: "Feng Xiaogang makes an assured return to his trademark genre, the romantic comedy. If You Are the One, a diverting urban lark about an unlikely couple coming together through blind dates, sports an affable cast and untaxing plot, harking back to the airy playfulness of his 1998 hit Be There or Be Square."

Perry Lam of Muse Magazine praised 'the unreserved energy Feng devotes to delivering us the predictable, coupled with the unembarrassed pleasure we take in enjoying the obvious. You can still make a movie with a formula, it would appear, so long as you bring the formula to vivid life.'
