= Father (2000 film) =

- Traditional Chinese: 冤家父子
- Simplified Chinese: 冤家父子
- Hanyu Pinyin: Yuānjiā Fùzǐ
- Directed by: Wang Shuo
- Written by: Feng Xiaogang; Wang Shuo; Novel: Wang Shuo
- Produced by: Han Sanping; Wang Weijing
- Starring: Feng Xiaogang; Hu Xiaopei; Xu Fan; Qin Yan; Wang Weining
- Cinematography: Yang Xiaoxiong
- Edited by: Zhou Ying
- Music by: Shi Wanchun
- Release date: August 11, 2000 (Locarno)
- Running time: 96 minutes
- Country: China
- Language: Mandarin

Father (Chinese: 冤家父子; pinyin: Yuānjiā Fùzǐ; lit. 'Feuding father and son') is a 2000 Chinese film directed by the writer Wang Shuo. To date, it is Wang's first and only directorial effort. The film is based on Wang's own novel, Wo Shi Ni Baba (English: I Am Your Father). Despite being partially backed by the state-run Beijing Film Studio, Father suffered from years of bureaucratic red tape due to being seen as an interpretation of as deconstructing authority in China. Made in 1996, the film was not screened until 2000, when it surreptitiously premiered at the 2000 Locarno International Film Festival.

The film stars director Feng Xiaogang, who also helped adapt Wang's novel for the screen.

== Plot ==
Father documents the tumultuous relationship between a widowed father, Ma Lisheng, and his school-age son, Ma Che. Though he works as a low-level party functionary during the day, he finds his greatest challenges in the raising of a son on his own. Alternating between trying to bond with his son (even getting drunk with him), and verbally accosting him, Ma is at a loss. One day the son decides that the best way for his father to stop harassing him, will be to find him a new wife, which he finds in the form of the mother of a school friend, Qing Huaiyuan.

== Cast ==
- Feng Xiaogang as Ma Lisheng, a widowed single father living in an old courtyard home with his son, Ma Che. A popular actor and director, Feng Xiaogang also co-wrote the film and is Wang's business partner in the production company, Beijing Good Dreams, which partially produced Father.
- Hu Xiaopei as Ma Che, Ma Lisheng's son.
- Xu Fan as Qi Huaiyuan, the mother of one of Ma Che's school friends.
- Qin Yan as Xia Jingping.
- Wang Weining as Xia Qing.
- Ye Qing as Tie Jun, Qi Huaiyuan's daughter.

== Reception ==
Never officially released in China, Father was not screened in the west until four years after its completion in February 1996. The film was banned by the Chinese Film Office before even reaching the Censor's office. The film was smuggled into Switzerland for the Locarno International Film Festival by the festival director Marco Muller, and would go on to win that festival's top prize, the Golden Leopard. The festival's jury chairman, Naum Klejman described Wang Shuo's film as "not only a very important film in the context of new cinema, in China and all over the world, it's also a film which gives a very human explanation of developing the societies in the world, it's universal."

Many critics, however, gave only measured praise. Derek Elley of Variety wrote that the film's two-part structure (the drama of the father-son relationship versus the broader comedy of the romance between Ma Lingyuan and Qi Huaiyuan) left the film a "little uneven in tone...," ultimately "los[ing] its focus in the final reels."
