= In the Heat of the Sun =

- Film poster
- Traditional Chinese: 陽光燦爛的日子
- Simplified Chinese: 阳光灿烂的日子
- Literal meaning: Days of the Bright and Lush Sunshine
- Hanyu Pinyin: Yángguāng Cànlàn De Rìzi
- Directed by: Jiang Wen
- Written by: Jiang Wen
- Based on: Wild Beast by Wang Shuo
- Produced by: Guo Youliang; Hsu An-chin; Po Ki
- Starring: Xia Yu; Ning Jing; Geng Le; Tao Hong
- Cinematography: Gu Changwei
- Edited by: Zhou Ying
- Music by: Guo Wenjing
- Production companies: Dragon Film; China Film Co-Production Corp.
- Release date: September 1994 (China)
- Running time: 134 minutes
- Country: China
- Language: Mandarin

In the Heat of the Sun (阳光灿烂的日子) is a 1994 Chinese coming-of-age film written and directed by Jiang Wen, marking his directorial debut. Loosely adapted from Wang Shuo's novel Wild Beast, the film offers a nostalgic lens of life during the Cultural Revolution – one not defined by political trauma, but by adolescent mischief, desire, and memory.

The film's original title, which roughly translates to "Bright Sunny Days", was changed to "In the Heat of the Sun" for international audiences during a film festival in Taiwan. The new title was chosen to minimize association with the Cultural Revolution.

== Synopsis ==
Set in Beijing during the early 1970s, at the height of the Cultural Revolution, In the Heat of the Sun is narrated by an adult Ma Xiaojun reflecting on his teenage years. Known by his nickname "Monkey" (played by Xia Yu), he recounts a summer of misadventure and desire. With schools shut down and many parents away, Monkey and his friends roam the streets freely, indulging in aimless adventure and mischief. The story, based in part on Jiang Wen's own experiences during the revolution, unfolds in a series of fragmented memories.

Monkey's carefree routine takes a turn when he becomes infatuated with Mi Lan (played by Ning Jing), an older girl he encounters after sneaking into her apartment using a skeleton key. Captivated by her image, he spends his days in the vicinity of her home and attempts to befriend her. Monkey eventually introduces Mi Lan to his group of friends, but tension rises when Mi Lan becomes romantically involved with Liu Yiku (played by Geng Le), one of Monkey's friends.

The story takes a dark turn when Monkey acts violently towards Mi Lan. In the aftermath, the group drifts apart, mirroring the end of a youthful era. The film concludes years later, as the characters briefly reunite as adults.

== Production ==
=== Development ===
In the Heat of the Sun began as an adaptation of Wang Shuo's novel Wild Beast, but Jiang Wen reshaped the novel into a coming-of-age story set in 1970s Beijing. Like the film's protagonist Ma Xiaojun, Jiang Wen grew up in Beijing's military housing compounds, and he chose to film on location in the city to enhance its authenticity and evoke the atmosphere of 1970s Beijing.

On May 1, 1992, Jiang Wen began writing the screenplay for In the Heat of the Sun in Beijing and completed the first draft on June 2. In the process, he expanded Wang Shuo's approximately 60,000-word novel Wild Beast into a screenplay of around 90,000 words. Due to difficulties in securing financing, Jiang temporarily shifted his attention to other projects, including Gun n' Rose and Beijingers in New York. In April 1993, a consortium formed by Hong Kong's Ganglong Company, Taiwan's Xiehe Company, and a Yunnan-based real-estate company jointly invested US$1 million in the project, finally securing the necessary funding. Once financing was obtained, Jiang recruited cinematographer Gu Changwei and began casting. The principal cast was initially selected in July 1993, and In the Heat of the Sun officially began principal photography on August 23, 1993.

=== Financing ===
Production was co-financed by three Chinese studios, with around $2 million USD in funding coming from Hong Kong investors. However, the film faced serious financial difficulties early on. One sponsor, a real estate company, withdrew before the start of filming due to the economic recession and Executive Producer Liu Xiaoqing covered debts out of pocket. Hong Kong-based producer Jean-Louis Piel became involved after viewing a rough cut of the film and agreed to help complete its post-production, including sound mixing, color timing, and the production of release prints. Piel later brought a ten-minute excerpt of the film to the Cannes Film Festival, where it attracted the attention of German director Volker Schlöndorff. With Schlöndorff's support, Jiang Wen was able to continue post-production work at Babelsberg Studios in Germany, where the film's sound mixing was completed. After work in Germany concluded, Piel helped arrange further post-production in Tokyo, where Jiang and cinematographer Gu Changwei completed the film's color timing and the production of release prints.

=== Adaption and themes ===
Jiang Wen's adaptation diverges significantly from Wang Shuo's original novel. American critic Derek Elley noted that Jiang Wen's adaption altered "some 70% of the original" novel and adds " a mass of personal memories."

Jiang Wen explained that Wild Beast evoked many of his own personal memories. Jiang Wen praised Wang Shuo's portrayal of a boy's maturation and noted that he was primarily interested in depicting the process of growing up—the transformation of a boy into a man. He stated that he "did not intend to make a Cultural Revolution film" and emphasized that the novel served primarily as a catalyst for his own recollections, with the film ultimately becoming a story drawn from his own life. At the same time, he acknowledged that the period could not be avoided entirely, as it formed the backdrop of his own youth and personal experiences. As Jiang Wen remarked, "we began to change during that time," making the Cultural Revolution an unavoidable historical setting for the story, even as the film focuses on memory, adolescence, and personal experience rather than political commentary.

Several characters and events were softened or reimagined. As Daniel Vukovich, author of China and Orientalism: Western Knowledge Production and the PRC observed, the film reframes its characters as "a small group of male friends, plus one female comrade" instead of "violent hooligans." Mi Lan, a girl the boys idolize, is even given more screen time and emotional focus in the film than in the novel. In general, Jiang Wen downplays ideological critique and heightens nostalgia. Under this perspective of "screening nostalgia," his youths are shaped into mischievous and romantic individuals, rather than hard-bitten and angry ones.

Scholar Yomi Braester further points out that while traditional cinema typically shows the Cultural Revolution as a "decade of catastrophe" and focuses on political persecution and individual suffering, Jiang Wen avoids this oversimplified political view. By focusing on the smoking, brawling, aimlessness, and sexual awakening of marginalized youths, he creates a unique kind of "street-smart history". This adaptation completely changes the traditional "telling bitterness" style of Chinese Cultural Revolution stories.

=== Casting ===
- Han Dong – Ma Xiaojun (马小军; 馬小軍; Mǎ Xiǎojūn), as a young boy.
- Xia Yu – Ma Xiaojun ("Monkey"), the film’s teenage protagonist.
- Feng Xiaogang – Mr. Hu (胡老师; 胡老師; Hú-lǎoshī), the teacher.
- Geng Le – Liu Yiku (刘忆苦; 劉憶苦; Liú Yìkǔ), as a teenager.
- Jiang Wen – Ma Xiaojun, as an adult (incl. narration).
- Ning Jing – Mi Lan (米兰; 米蘭; Mǐ Lán).
- Tao Hong – Yu Beibei (Chinese: 于北蓓; pinyin: Yú Běibèi).
- Shang Nan – Liu Sitian (刘思甜; 劉思甜; Liú Sītián).
- Wang Hai – Big Ant.
- Liu Xiaoning – Liu Yiku, as an adult.
- Siqin Gaowa – Zhai Ru (翟茹; Zhái Rú – Xiaojun's mother).
- Wang Xueqi – Ma Wenzhong (马文中; 馬文中; Mǎ Wénzhōng – Xiaojun's father).
- Fang Hua – Old general.
- Dai Shaobo – Yang Gao (羊搞; Yáng Gǎo).
- Zuo Xiaoqing – Zhang Xiaomei.
- Yao Erga – Fat fool (傻子; Shǎ zi).

=== Casting Notes ===
Jiang Wen adopted an unconventional casting strategy for the film, intentionally selecting young non-professionals with strong athletic backgrounds rather than traditional actors. For the lead role of teenage Ma Xiaojun, he cast Xia Yu, who was a local skateboarding champion from Qingdao, was cast partly due to his "uncanny resemblance to Jiang Wen himself and a likable combination of insolence and innocence." The film also marked the acting debuts of synchronized swimmer Tao Hong and rhythmic gymnast Zuo Xiaoqing.

Many of these young cast members were under 14 years old and had dropped out of school, which helped ground the film in the raw, lived experiences of its characters.

Wendy Larson, author of From Ah Q to Lei Feng: Freud and Revolutionary Spirit in 20th Century China, wrote that the selection of "an awkward-looking boy" who "contrasts with the more conventional tall good looks" of Liu Yiku was clever on part of Jiang Wen, and that Xia Yu "portrays [Ma Xiaojun] as charmingly shy and mischievous in social relationships yet forceful and engaging in his emotions." The character has the nickname "Monkey" in the film version, which "Monkey" was the nickname of director Jiang Wen.

Originally, Jiang Wen filmed himself playing the adult Ma Xiaojun in several scenes. However, unsatisfied with his performance and due to time limits, he eventually chose to remove these scenes from the final cut.

=== Filming and style ===
This cinematography of the film was handled by Gu Changwei, one of Mainland China's most acclaimed photographers. Gu Changwei's previous works includes films such as Red Sorghum, Ju dou, and Farewell My Concubine.

The production used a golden-yellow color palette to evoke a dreamlike and sentimental atmosphere. In contrast to the more historical, often politically charged portrayals of the Cultural Revolution seen in the works of 5th-generation Chinese filmmakers (e.g., Zhang Yimou, Chen Kaige, Tian Zhuangzhuang), In The Heat Of the Sun is mellow and dream-like, portraying memories of that era with somewhat positive and personal resonances. The film's nostalgic perspective is established earlier on in the film as the narrator, Ma Xiaojun, reflects on the past, acknowledging the unreliability of his memory. He states in the prologue: "Change has wiped out my memories. I can't tell what's imagined from what's real," setting the stage for alternative or imagined version of events, as the film explores how people romanticize their youthful memories. This structural unreliability is mirrored in the shifting narrative presence of Yu Beibei (played by Tao Hong). In the beginning, she accompanies the boys and gives rise to sexual tension amongst them, but after Mi Lan is introduced, she completely disappears from the group until the second telling of the birthday party scene. Larson states that Yu Beibei "is a significant character" in the first part of the film and that her sudden disappearance is a "persistent clue that all is not as it seems," signaling that the narrative is a highly subjective construction.

In one scene, Jiang Wen gives Ma Xiaojun's memory a hazy, dreamlike quality, emphasizing the subjectivity of memory over objective fact. To reinforce this idea, he employs a Brechtian technique: the image suddenly freezes while the narrator pauses to reflect. This deliberate break in the narrative flow draws attention to the story's unreliability and encourages the audience to see the moment as filtered through personal memory rather than reality.

The film also broke new ground in mainland China cinema through its frank depiction of adolescent sexuality. Scenes such as shower sequences involving boys and a topless shot of Mi Lan challenged censorship norms and introduced a level of openness rarely seen in contemporary Chinese films of the time.

=== Symbolism ===
Ma Xiaojun frequently uses the mirror to project his fragile, idealized fantasies of masculinity and power. Scholar Louise Williams points out that when Xiaojun steals his father's military medals, puts on the uniform, and performs lonely monologues in front of the mirror, the scene shows the falseness of the "heroism" approved by the politics of that era.

Ma Xiaojun's obsession with picking locks and his possession of master keys can be understood from both political and gender perspectives. Scholar Yomi Braester views the skeleton keys as symbolic tools used to unlock private home spaces, allowing Xiaojun to break free from public ideological control. In contrast, Louise Williams offers a psychoanalytic reading, arguing that the keys represent an alternative fantasy space created by Xiaojun, which allows him to temporarily escape the control of patriarchal and institutional authority.

The small key tied to Mi Lan's ankle represents her personal independence and sexual autonomy. During the violent climax of the attempted assault, Ma Xiaojun's desperate act of ripping this key from her body is interpreted as an aggressive behavior to forcefully assert male dominance and possess her reality. The breaking of this key marks the final of his idealized adolescent fantasies.

=== Release, censorship and restoration ===
In the Heat of the Sun was completed after nearly two years of production and submitted to Chinese film censors. The State Film Bureau issued seven modification requests – mainly minor changes to dialogue – and insisted on removing or muting sensitive material. Among the censorship concerns were politically sensitive content, including the prominent use of the Communist anthem L'Internationale in a street fight scene. Jiang Wen successfully argued to keep the scene, but the music's volume was heavily lowered in the final 1995 release. Other material deemed too frank was cut or muted. The film was subsequently shown at an invitation-only screening at Beijing's Poly Plaza on 12 October 1994 for invited guests and industry figures. On 19 May 1995, Chinese authorities approved the film for release as a co-production and issued a further five modification requests. The film had its overseas premiere in Hong Kong on 28 June 1995. It was officially approved for domestic release in China on 14 August 1995, and its mainland premiere was held in Shanghai on 21 August 1995 with a run time of approximately 128 minutes, incorporating the necessary cuts and changes imposed by the censors.

In 2013, the film underwent a full digital restoration funded by Orange Sky Golden Harvest Entertainment in collaboration with Jiang Wen. The restored version features a high-definition scan and an upgraded 5.1‑channel soundtrack. Running about 140 minutes, it includes nearly 12 minutes of footage that had been removed from the original release for censorship or length, including the "dream within a dream" montage and an explicit dialogue scene that had been excised, as well as other material omitted from the 1995 version.

The restored In the Heat of the Sun premiered in the Venice Classics section in the 70th Venice International Film Festival. While critics praised the opportunity to see Jiang Wen's film in a more complete from, some noted that the restored print retained a grainy, vintage look rather than appearing sharply "refreshed."

== Reception ==
In the Heat of the Sun was widely acclaimed both domestically and internationally. The film won Best Actor for Xia Yu at the Venice Film Festival in 1994, making him the youngest recipient of the award. It also won numerous awards at the 33rd Golden Horse Awards in Taiwan, including Best Feature, Best Director, Best Actor, Best Adapted Screenplay, Best Cinematography and Best Sound Editing. Additionally, it was the first film from the People's Republic of China film to win Best Feature Film in the Golden Horse Awards, a significant milestone as it marked the first year where Chinese-language films from the mainland were allowed to participate.

Immediately after its release, major critics praised it as the most important work in Chinese cinema since Zhang Yimou's Red Sorghum (1987). Like Zhang Yimou's film, In the Heat of the Sun reinvented cinematic language while retelling a key moment in China's history, highlighting the film's significance within the evolution of Chinese cinema.

In 1995, In the Heat of the Sun was a domestic box office hit, surpassing Hollywood blockbusters such as The True Lies, Lion King and Forrest Gump. Critics praised the film's cinematography, its emotional depth, and its innovative narrative style. It was also one of the first major Chinese films to directly engage with the Cultural Revolution from a highly personal and introspective perspective. Scholars have since regarded the film as a landmark in Sixth Generation Chinese cinema, both for its stylistic choices and for its subtle political commentary.

Despite its success, the film also stirred controversy in China. Some critics such as "scar literature" writer Feng Jicai, criticized the film for its "indiscriminate nostalgia" and "positive" portrayal of the Cultural Revolution, arguing that it lacked the harsh realities many had experienced.

According to Vukovich, the film "received much less attention than any fifth-generation classics" despite the "critical appreciation in festivals abroad". Vukovich stated that in Western countries "the film has been subjected to an all too familiar coding as yet another secretly subversive, dissenting critique of Maoist and Cultural Revolution totalitarianism", with the exceptions being the analyses of Chen Xiaoming from Mainland China and Wendy Larson.

== Trivia ==
Jiang Wen, having lived through the Cultural Revolution, intentionally avoided the stereotypical imagery often associated with the Cultural Revolution, such as Red Guards wielding Mao's Little Red Book. Instead, his film presents a more intimate and less overtly political view of the era, showing children dancing and holding flowers together in the playground.

Before making his directorial debut, Jiang Wen has contributed to uncredited writing or revisions on several influential films such as Red Sorghum (1987), Li Lianying: The Imperial Eunuch (1991) and Black Snow (1990).

Jiang Wen asked the photographer not to be a spectator but to be a role in the film, which posed a great challenge to the choice of viewpoints.

== Music ==
Cavalleria Rusticana

One of the most prominent pieces is Pietro Mascagni's Cavalleria Rusticana, which is played throughout the main plot. Mascagni's opera has been widely used in cinema and is known for its emotional intensity, featured in films like The Godfather III (1990) and Martin Scorsese's Raging Bull (1980). In the Heat of the Sun uses Cavalleria Rusticana "Intermezzo" as a leitmotif, evoking the film's nostalgic and romanticized tone, particularly in scenes that focus on the Ma Xiaojun's longing and desire for Mi Lan.

Moscow Nights

The film also uses the Chinese version of Moscow Nights, a well-known Soviet song which features in several key moments, contributing to the nostalgic atmosphere of the era.

L'Internationale

Another prominent piece used in the film is L'Internationale, a left-wing anthem that has been associated with the socialist movement since the late nineteenth century. The song is used as a dramatic element during the fight scene between two opposing gangs, creating a contrast between its revolutionary ideals and the impulsive violence of adolescence unfolding onscreen. Due to censorship concerns, the anthem's volume was significantly lowered in the final release.

Katyusha

In the Heat of the Sun also incorporates Katyusha (Russian:Катюша), a Soviet folk-based song composed by Matnvey Blanter in 1938. The song is widely known in China due to influence from the Soviet Union in the 1950s after a treaty of alliance signed between the PRC and Soviet Union. In the film, Katyusha plays during a peaceful celebration scene where the two opposing gangs come together to celebrate a momentary truce.

In addition to these iconic songs, Jiang Wen incorporates a variety of revolutionary anthems including Chairman Mao, Revolutionary Soldiers Wish you a Long Life (毛主席，革命战士祝您万寿无疆), Missing Chairman Mao—the Savior (想念恩人毛主席), Ode to Beijing (北京颂歌) and Sun Shining on the Jinggang Mountain (井冈山上太阳红).
