= A World Without Thieves =

2004 Chinese-Hong Kong film by Feng Xiaogang

- Directed by: Feng Xiaogang
- Screenplay by: Feng Xiaogang; Wang Gang; Lin Lisheng; Zhang Jialu
- Based on: A World Without Thieves by Zhao Benfu
- Produced by: Liu Zhenyun; Wang Zhonglei; Yan Yujing
- Starring: Andy Lau; Rene Liu; Ge You; Li Bingbing; Wang Baoqiang
- Cinematography: Zhang Li
- Edited by: Liu Miaomiao
- Music by: Wang Liguang
- Distributed by: Media Asia Distribution Ltd.
- Release dates: 5 December 2004 (China); 9 December 2004 (Hong Kong); 21 January 2005 (Taiwan)
- Running time: 113 min.
- Countries: China; Hong Kong
- Language: Mandarin

A World Without Thieves (simplified Chinese: 天下无贼; traditional Chinese: 天下無賊; pinyin: Tiānxià Wú Zéi) is a 2004 comedy action drama film directed by Feng Xiaogang and starring Andy Lau, Rene Liu, Ge You, Wang Baoqiang and Li Bingbing. A Chinese-Hong Kong co-production, the film is an adaptation of a 1999 novelette of the same title by Zhao Benfu. The original story is moderately different from the film adaptation. The film was first released in Shanghai, China on 5 December 2004. It clinched the 2005 Golden Horse Award for Best Screenplay Adaptation.

The film was released in Hong Kong with Cantonese dubbing provided by Lau for his own role, Anthony Wong for the role of Uncle Li, and Chapman To for the role of Sha Gen.

The plot is centered on a naïve village boy who does not believe in the existence of thieves. Returning home on board a train with his savings, he soon becomes the target of many thieves. The film explores the theme of the fundamental human goodness and also addresses humorously the issue of thievery on public transport in Mainland China.

== Plot ==
The story is set primarily on a train bound inland from Tibet. Sha Gen ("Dumbo" in the U.S. version, played by Wang Baoqiang), a naïve village boy working as construction worker in Tibet, was returning home to get married. Refusing to believe that thieves exist in the world, Sha Gen insists on carrying his five years of savings worth ¥60,000 ($8,400 USD) with him rather than use remittance. Sha Gen also brazenly shouts his earnings in a crowded street. As such, he has attracted the attention of Wang Bo (Andy Lau) and Wang Li (Rene Liu), who are lovers as well as highly skilled professional thieves. Wang Bo wants to steal the money as a last hit to end their career, but Wang Li, pregnant with their child and moved by Sha Gen's innocence, decides to protect the boy.

The situation is further complicated when a small gang of thieves led by Hu Li (homophone of fox (狐狸 Húli) in Chinese), also known as Uncle Li (Ge You), boards the train. Uncle Li instructs his followers, among them Xiao Ye (Li Bingbing) and Four-Eyes (Gordon Lam), to refrain from doing a job on the train. Tempted by the huge amount of cash, however, some members disobey and strike, only to be robbed by Wang Bo moments later. This exposes Wang's skills to Uncle Li, who becomes highly interested in recruiting him. When Wang declines, the contest between the Wangs and Uncle Li's gang quickly escalates, with Sha Gen still completely unaware of the danger surrounding him.

While the two sides tussle, however, a plainclothes police detective (Zhang Hanyu) has been silently watching and awaiting his chance. As the police force eventually closes in, Uncle Li attempts to make off with Sha Gen's money but is confronted by Wang Bo, who has finally promised to lend his help to Wang Li to protect Sha Gen's innocence. The two engage in a violent hand-to-hand combat. Although Wang succeeds in retrieving the money and giving it back, he is seriously injured in the fray, and subsequently dies. Uncle Li and his gang are all apprehended as the train pulls into station, but the police officer lets Wang Li go on compassionate grounds. Wang Li returns to Tibet sometime later, and prays to the heavens in a show of penance.

== Cast ==
- Andy Lau as Wang Bo (Chinese: 王 薄; pinyin: Wáng Bó)
- Rene Liu as Wang Li (simplified Chinese: 王 丽; traditional Chinese: 王 麗; pinyin: Wáng Lì)
- Ge You as Hu Li, a.k.a. Uncle Li (黎叔; Lí-shū),
- Li Bingbing as Xiao Ye (小叶; 小葉; Xiǎo Yè; 'Little Ye')
- Wang Baoqiang as Sha Gen (傻根; Shǎ Gēn; 'Foolish Root' "Dumbo" in the U.S. version)
- You Yong as Thief Number Two (二当家; 二當家; Èr Dāngjiā) or "Fatty" (胖子; Pàngzi), follower of Uncle Li
- Gordon Lam as Four-Eyes (四眼; Sìyǎn)
- Zhang Hanyu as police detective (警察; Jǐngchá; 'Police')
- Fu Biao as General Manager Liu (刘经理; 劉經理; Liú-jīnglǐ), a previous victim of the Wangs
- Xu Fan as General Manager Liu's wife
- Fan Wei as fat robber
- Feng Yuanzheng as thin robber
- Zhong Ping as plain-clothes policewoman
- Chen Zhihui

== Reception ==
The film recorded ¥100,000 in box office earnings on its premier night in Beijing. Within ten days of release the total box office earnings in Mainland China exceeded ¥80 million. This figure rose to ¥100 million on the last day of 2004. This, together with a comparable box office achievement by the Stephen Chow production Kung Fu Hustle, released within the same month, has been hailed as a new milestone for the Chinese film industry. However, the film did not do as well in the Hong Kong market.

Almost two months after the film's release, China Post voiced dissatisfaction over the film's misguiding information on the administrative charges for remitting money through China Post. In a scene, Sha Gen claimed that remitting ¥60,000 requires an administrative charge of ¥600. China Post verified that it would only require ¥100 and said it would not rule out seeking damages.

== Awards and nominations ==
- Golden Horse Awards, 2005
  - Best Screenplay Adaptation – Feng Xiaogang, Wang Gang, Lin Lisheng, Zhang Jialu
  - Best Picture (nominated)
  - Best Action Choreography (nominated)
  - Best Editing (nominated)
- 24th Hong Kong Film Awards, 2005
  - Best Asian Film (nominated)
- Golden Bauhinia Awards, 2005
  - Best Leading Actress – Rene Liu
  - Top Ten Chinese Films
- Montréal World Film Festival, 2005
  - Grand Prix des Amériques (nominated)
- Hundred Flowers Awards, 2006
  - Best Leading Actress – Rene Liu
