= Yao Chen =

Chinese actress and philanthropist

- 姚晨
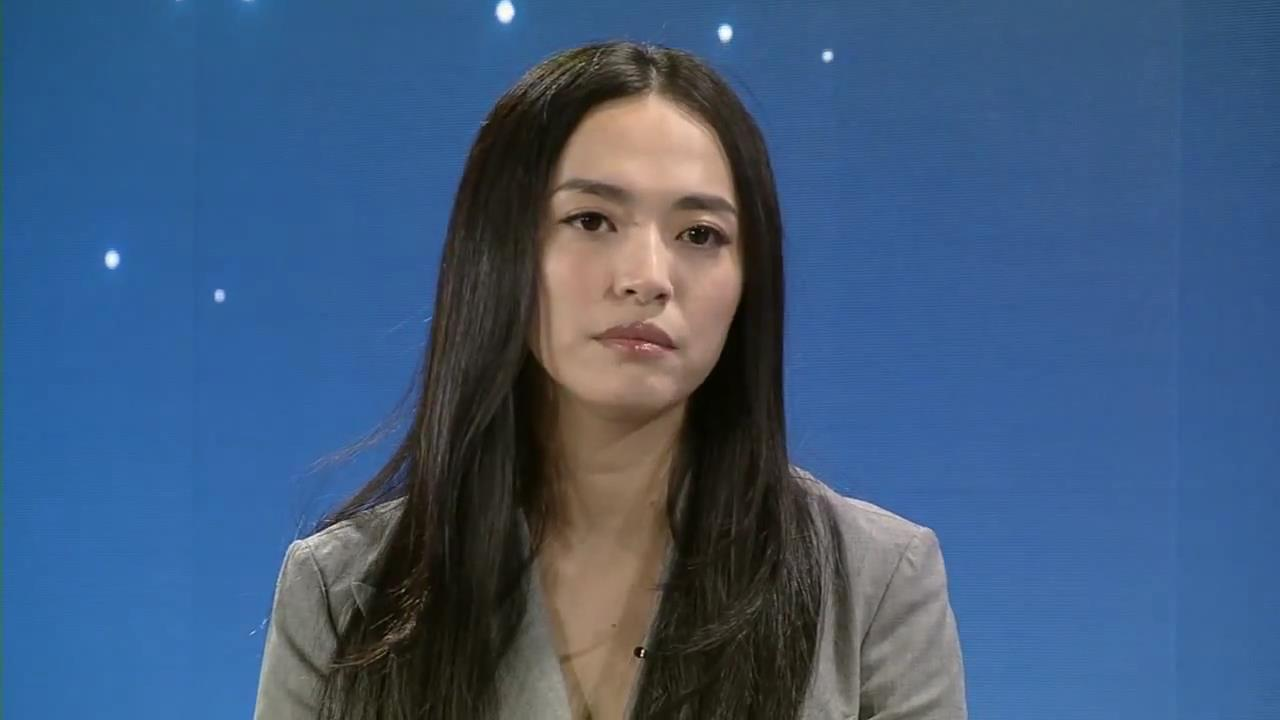
- Yao during a panel discussion of World Economic Forum, 2014
- Born: 5 October 1979 (age 46); Fuzhou, Fujian, China
- Education: Beijing Film Academy
- Occupation: Actress
- Years active: 2005–present
- Agents: Huayi Brothers; Yao Chen Studio (present)
- Spouses: Ling Xiaosu (m. 2004; div. 2011) Cao Yu (m. 2012; div. 2026)
- Children: Xiao Tudou (son); Xiao Moli (daughter)

Chinese name
- Chinese: 姚晨
Transcriptions
Standard Mandarin
- Hanyu Pinyin: Yáo Chén
Yue: Cantonese
- Jyutping: Jiu4 San
Southern Min
- Hokkien POJ: Iâu Sîn
- Tâi-lô: Iâu Sîn
- Website: blog.sina.com.cn/yaochen

Signature
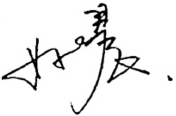

Yao Chen (Chinese: 姚晨; pinyin: Yáo chén; Pe̍h-ōe-jī: Iâu Sîn, born 5 October 1979) is a Chinese actress and philanthropist. She achieved success with her role in the sitcom My Own Swordsman (2006) and went on to star in the television series Lurk (2008), Divorce Lawyers (2014), and All Is Well (2019). Her notable films include Caught in the Web (2012), Firestorm (2013), Lost, Found (2018), and Send Me to the Clouds (2019).

From late 2009 to 2012, Yao was the most followed celebrity on Weibo, winning the first "Weibo Queen" at the 2011 Weibo Night. In 2013, she was named the first UN Refugee Agency Goodwill Ambassador in China. In 2014, Yao was named as one of the most influential people on the Time 100 list, and named by Forbes as the 83rd most powerful woman in the world. Yao ranked 77th on Forbes China Celebrity 100 list in 2008, 73rd in 2009, 78th in 2010, 24th in 2011, 33rd in 2012, 56th in 2013, 69th in 2014, 41st in 2015, and 60th in 2019.

== Early life ==
Yao was born in Fuzhou, Fujian province on 5 October 1979 to a middle-class family. She studied Chinese folk dance at the Beijing Dance Academy from 1993 to 1997. She was admitted into Beijing Film Academy in 1999, where her classmates included actors Ling Xiaosu, Yu Bo, and Ye Jing. She graduated from Beijing Film Academy in 2003.

== Career ==
=== Acting ===
Yao was propelled to fame by her role as the daughter of a powerful martial artist in the 2005 sitcom My Own Swordsman. Following this, in 2008, she played the part of a guerilla leader in the popular series Lurk, for which she won the Best Actress award at the Huading Awards and the Golden Eagle Awards. Yao opened a Sina Weibo account in 2009, becoming one of the earliest celebrities in China to embrace social media, which led to runaway success. In the early 2010s, her immense popularity on Chinese social media earned her the title of “Weibo Queen.”

In 2009, Yao made her theatrical debut, playing a white-collar heroine in A Story of Lala's Promotion. She also had a supporting role in the romantic comedy Sophie's Revenge. Yao then starred in romantic comedy Color Me Love (2010) as an aspiring fashion magazine editor, which would go on to become one of her most famous film roles. In 2012, Yao starred in Chen Kaige's social drama Caught in the Web as a truth-seeking journalist. She then starred alongside Andy Lau in the action thriller Firestorm, which won her the Outstanding Actress award at the Chinese Film Media Awards.

Yao played a lawyer in the 2014 TV drama Divorce Lawyers, followed by a series of blockbusters Monster Hunt (2015), Chronicles of the Ghostly Tribe (2015) and Journey to the West 2 (2017). Yao was nominated as Best Supporting Actress at the Hundred Flowers Awards for her performance in Monster Hunt. She also starred in MBA Partners (2016), playing an ambitious young woman.

In 2017, Yao served as the jury of the 23rd Shanghai Television Festival. In 2018, Yao starred in the mystery film Lost, Found, a remake of the South Korean film Missing. In 2019, Yao starred in the family drama All Is Well, for which she received the Best Actress Award of the Busan International Film Festival's Asia Contents Awards. In the same year, she received the Golden Rooster Award for the film Send Me To The Clouds (2019), as well as the Singapore International Film Festival’s cinema icon award. She starred in If You are the One 3 in 2023.

=== Activism ===
In 2012, Yao was named the UNHCR's Honorary Patron for China and has visited refugees in places including the Philippines, Thailand, Somalia, Sudan and Ethiopia. The number of her Weibo followers during the visit increased dramatically. In 2013, she was named the first UNHCR goodwill ambassador in China. Yao was among the recipients of the 2016 Crystal Award for her work on behalf of the U.N. refugee agency in raising awareness of the world refugee crisis. The same year, she was selected as one of the "Young Global Leaders" in 2016 by the World Economic Forum. Yao was also awarded the Top Influence Award at the You Bring Charm to the World award ceremony. For Yao’s works and impacts in Asia and the world, she was received 2023 Asia Game Changer Award from Asia Society.

== Endorsements ==
In 2018, Yao was selected as brand ambassador for Italian fashion house Etro.

In 2021, Yao Chen joined actress Charlize Theron and prima-ballerina Misty Copeland as brand ambassadors for Breitling, dubbed the Breitling Spotlight Squad.

Since 2021, Italian jeweller Pomellato has announced Yao as its Chinese Brand Ambassador.

== Personal life ==
In 2004, Yao married college sweetheart and Chinese actor Ling Xiaosu. They divorced in 2011.

Yao married cinematographer Cao Yu in November 2012. She gave birth to their son in 2013, and three years later, she gave birth to their daughter. On March 16, 2026, Yao announced on Weibo that she had divorced Cao many years ago.

== Filmography ==
=== Film ===
Year	English title	Chinese title	Role	Notes/Ref.
2006	Axis of War: My Long March	我的长征	Su Ma	
2006	Big Movie	大电影之数百亿	Luo Qian	
2007	Falling in Love	追爱总动员		Cameo
2007	Two Stupid Eggs	大电影2.0之两个傻瓜的荒唐事	Yan Zi	
2007	Crossed Lines	命运呼叫转移	Ma Ting	
2009	Sophie's Revenge	非常完美	Lily	
2009	All's Well, Ends Well	H家有喜事2009	Xiao Yazhen	
2009	Freeway	天堂凹	Jin Hong	
2010	If You Are the One 2	非诚勿扰2	Mango	
2010	Love in Cosmo	摇摆de婚约	Wang Shunjia	
2010	Color Me Love	爱出色	Wang Xiaofei	
2011	My Own Swordsman	武林外传	Guo Furong	
2012	Caught in the Web	搜索	Chen Ruoxi	
2012	The Monkey King: Uproar in Heaven	大闹天宫		Voice-dubbed
2013	My Lucky Star	非常幸运	Lily	Cameo
2013	Control	控制	Jessica	
2013	Firestorm	风暴2	Yan Bing	
2015	Monster Hunt	捉妖记	Cooking Master	Special appearance
2015	Chronicles of the Ghostly Tribe	九层妖塔	Shirley Yang	
2016	Everybody's Fine	一切都好	Guan Qing	
2016	The New Year's Eve of Old Lee	过年好		Cameo
2016	MBA Partners	梦想合伙人	Lu Zhenxi	
2017	Journey to the West 2	西游伏妖篇	Jiu Gong	
2018	Goddesses in the Flames of War	那些女人		
2018	Lost, Found	找到你	Li Jie	
2019	Send Me to the Clouds	送我上青云	Sheng Nan	
2019	A Journey to the Seaside	亲密旅行		
2020	The Eight Hundred	八佰	Ho Hsiang-ning	
2023	Flaming Cloud	三贵情史		
2023	If You Are the One 3	非常勿扰3		

=== Television series ===
Year	English title	Chinese title	Role	Notes/Ref.
2003	City Girl	都市男女	Su Qingqing	
2003		神鞭	Zhan Jiarong	
2004	Chui Shi Ban's Story 2	炊事班的故事2	Xiao Yao	
2006	Life Concern	人命关天	Meng Ting	
2006	My Own Swordsman	武林外传	Guo Furong	
2007		房前屋后	Gu Lili	
2007	Chui Shi Ban's Story 3	炊事班的故事3	Xiao Yao	
2007	Fuwa	福娃	Huanhuan / Pululu	Voice
2008	Six Cities	都市六人行	Fang Fang	Guest appearance
2008	China's Volunteers	中国志愿者	Ye Meng	Voice
2008	Lione	防火墙5788	Song Yuxiu	
2008	Hundred Years Past Events	百年往事	He Jiabi	
2009	Health Team's Story	卫生队的故事	Xiao Yao	
2009	Lurk	潜伏	Wang Cuiping	
2010	Niu Tie Han and his Daughters	牛铁汉和他的儿女们	Gu Xiaoxin	
2010	Days with the Air Hostess	和空姐一起的日子	Ran Jing	
2013	Longmen Express	龙门镖局	Lu Qingning	Cameo
2014	Wonder Lady 3	极品女士第三季	Lawyer Luo	Cameo
2014	Divorce Lawyers	离婚律师	Luo Li	
2019	All Is Well	都挺好	Su Mingyu	
2021	Vacation of Love	假日暖洋洋	Xu Keyi	

== Discography ==
=== Soundtrack appearances ===
Year	English title	Chinese title	Album
2007	"Searching"	寻找	Fuwa OST
2014	"Don't Let Love Be Lost"	别让爱迷路	Divorce Lawyers OST
2016	"A Letter Home"	一封家书	Everybody's Fine OST
2017	"Love in a Life Time"	一生所爱	Journey to the West: The Demons Strike Back OST

== Awards and nominations ==
Year	Nominated work	Award	Category	Result	Ref.
2009	Lurk	27th Flying Apsaras Awards	Outstanding Actress	Nominated	
2010	Lurk	2nd Huading Awards	Best Actress	Won	
2010	Lurk	25th China TV Golden Eagle Award	Audience's Choice for Actress	Won	
2011	Love in Cosmo	5th Huading Awards	Best Actress in Romance Film	Won	
2011	My Own Swordsman	18th Beijing College Student Film Festival	Most Popular Actress	Won	
2011	—N/a	13th Golden Phoenix Awards	Society Award	Won	
2011	Color Me Love	11th Chinese Film Media Awards	Outstanding Actress	Nominated	
2014	Firestorm	14th Chinese Film Media Awards	Outstanding Actress	Won	
2015	Divorce Lawyers	15th Huading Awards	Best Actress (TV)	Nominated	
2015	Divorce Lawyers	21st Shanghai Television Festival	Best Actress	Nominated	
2015	Divorce Lawyers	13th Sichuan Television Festival	Best Actress	Nominated	
2016	Monster Hunt	33rd Hundred Flowers Awards	Best Supporting Actress	Nominated	
2016	Monster Hunt	13th Changchun Film Festival	Best Supporting Actress	Nominated	
2016	Chronicles of the Ghostly Tribe; Goddesses in the Flames of War	3rd China Australia International Film Festival	Special Jury Award	Won	
2019	Lost, Found	26th Beijing College Student Film Festival	Best Actress	Won	
2019	Lost, Found	25th Huading Awards	Best Actress	Nominated	
2019	Lost, Found	21st Far East Film Festival	Golden Mulberry award for outstanding achievement	Won	
2019	All Is Well	25th Shanghai Television Festival	Best Actress	Nominated	
2019	All Is Well	24th Busan International Film Festival	Asian Contents Awards - Best Actress	Won	
2019	All Is Well	6th The Actors of China Award Ceremony	Best Actress (Sapphire Category)	Nominated	
2019	All Is Well	26th Huading Awards	Best Actress	Nominated	
2019	All Is Well	Golden Bud - The Fourth Network Film And Television Festival	Best Actress	Nominated	
2019	All Is Well	8th China Student Television Festival	Most Watched Actress	Won	
2019	All Is Well	Tencent Video All Star Awards	TV Actor of the Year	Won	
2019	All Is Well	Film and TV Role Model 2019 Ranking	Best Actress	Won	
2019	All Is Well	Tencent Entertainment White Paper	Television Actress of the Year	Won	
2019	All Is Well	Tencent Entertainment White Paper	Reputable Actress of the Year	Won	
2019	Send Me to the Clouds	32nd Golden Rooster Awards	Best Actress	Nominated	
2019	Send Me to the Clouds	32nd Tokyo International Film Festival; Gold Crane Awards	Best Actress	Won	
2019	—N/a	Night of the Film	Film Commemoration Award	Won	
2020	Send Me to the Clouds	29th Huading Awards	Best Actress	Nominated	
2020	Send Me to the Clouds	11th China Film Director's Guild Awards	Best Actress	Nominated	
