= Crossed Lines (film) =

- Poster
- Directed by: Liu Yiwei; Lin Jinhe
- Starring: Ge You; Fan Bingbing; Annie Shizuka Inoh; Liu Yiwei
- Release date: 29 November 2007
- Running time: 120 minutes
- Country: China
- Language: Mandarin

Crossed Lines (Chinese: 命运呼叫转移; pinyin: Mìngyùn Hūjiào Zhuǎnyí) is a Chinese comedy anthology film.

== Cast ==
=== Segment 1: "The Misunderstanding" ===
- Director: Liu Yiwei
- Yang Lixin
- Xu Zheng
- Xu Fan
- Liu Yiwei

=== Segment 2: "The Eulogy" ===
- Director: Lin Jinhe
- Fan Bingbing
- Wang Xuebing
- Che Yongli
- Jin Sha

=== Segment 3: "The Sticks" ===
- Director: Sun Zhou
- Ge You
- Yan Ni
- Mao Junjie
- Sun Zhou

=== Segment 4: "The Boy Who Cried Wolf" ===
- Director: Shen Lei & Alfred Cheung
- Chiu Hsin-chih
- Yao Chen
- Annie Yi
- Kong Wei
- Michelle Bai
- Aya Liu

== Reception ==
The film was released on 29 November 2007, and reached number one at mainland China box office for two consecutive weeks. It earned a total of 35 million RMB as of 23 December 2007.
