= Ge You =

Chinese actor (born 1957)

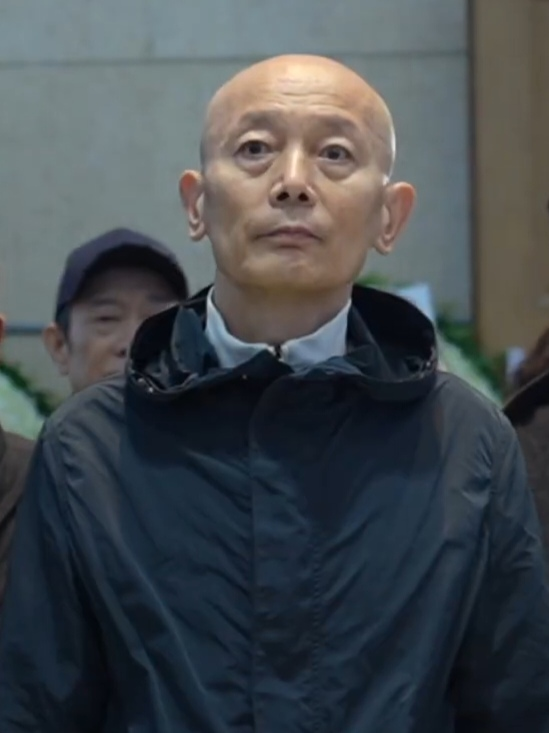
- Ge in 2025
- Born: April 19, 1957 (age 69); Beijing, China
- Years active: 1985–present
- Spouse: He Cong (married 1988)
- Awards: Cannes Film Festival; 1994 Best Actor Award (Cannes Film Festival) – To Live Golden Phoenix Awards; 2009 Special Jury AwardGolden Rooster Awards – Best Actor; 1993 After Separation Hundred Flowers Awards – Best Actor; 1998 The Dream Factory; 2002 Big Shot's Funeral; 2004 Cell Phone; Best Supporting Actor; 1992 Spring Festival Golden Eagle Awards – Best Actor; 1992 Stories From The Editorial Board

Chinese name
- Simplified Chinese: 葛优
- Traditional Chinese: 葛優
Transcriptions
Standard Mandarin
- Hanyu Pinyin: Gě Yōu

Ge You (born April 19, 1957) is a Chinese actor. One of the most critically acclaimed performers in China, Ge is known for his signature bald head, comic timing, and intelligent, subtle acting. Ge became the first Asian actor to win the Cannes Best Actor Award for his role in Zhang Yimou's To Live (1994). He is also known for TV sitcoms Stories From The Editorial Board (1992) and I Love My Family (1994); films After Separation (1993), Farewell, My Concubine (1993), The Emperor’s Shadow (1996), The Dream Factory (1997), Big Shot's Funeral (2001), Cell Phone (2003), A World Without Thieves (2004), The Banquet (2006), Sacrifice (2010), and the film series If You Are the One (2008–2023).

== Career ==
Ge's father, Ge Cunzhuang, was an actor who appeared in Little Soldier Zhang Ga, Red Flag Composition, Daqing Artillery Team. Ge's mother Shi Wenxin was a script editor at the Beijing Film Studio. Ge's younger sister Ge Jia, who studied philosophy and German literature, is a writer living in America.

After graduating from middle school, Ge went to the suburbs of Beijing to farm pigs. At the age of 25, he joined the Art Troupe of the National Federation of Trade Unions and became a stage actor. In 1984, Ge played a small role in Sheng Xia and His Fiancée.

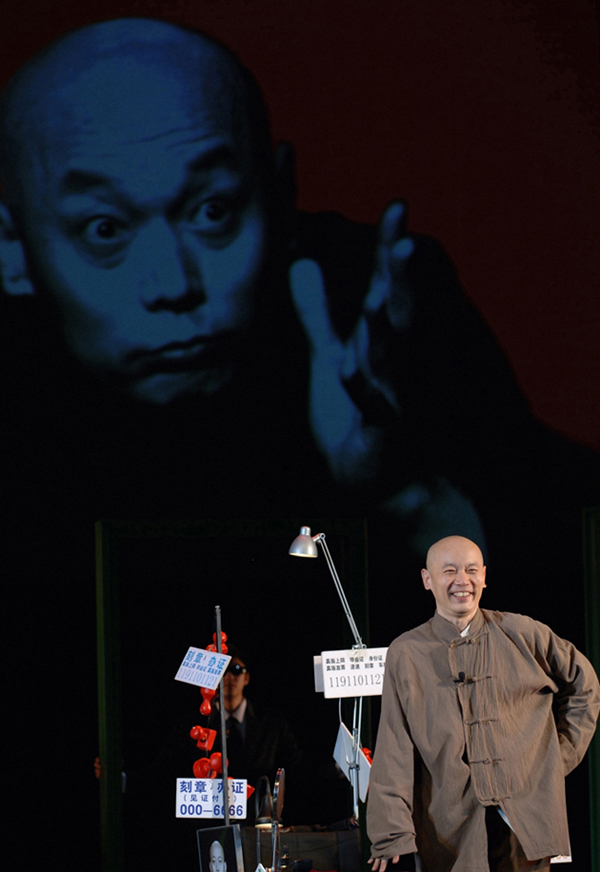
Ge in 2007

Ge was propelled to fame when he starred in the film The Troubleshooters (1988), adapted from Wang Shuo's popular novel of the same name, for which Ge was nominated for the Golden Rooster Award for Best Actor. In 1992, he starred in the TV sitcom Stories From The Editorial Board. He gained international acclaim for his role in the film To Live (1994), directed by Zhang Yimou and adapted from the novel by Yu Hua. For the film, he became the first Chinese to win the Best Actor Award at the Cannes Film Festival. He followed with a series of critically acclaimed films such as Steel Meets Fire (1991), The Spring Festival (1991), which won him the Hundred Flowers Award for Best Supporting Actor, and Farewell My Concubine (1993). Since 1997, he has established a successful collaboration with director Feng Xiaogang.

== Personal life ==
Ge met He Cong, then an art teacher, in 1985. They married in 1988.

== Filmography ==
=== Film ===
| Year | English title | Chinese title | Role | Notes/Ref. |
|---|---|---|---|---|
| 1985 | Sheng Xia He Ta De Wei Hun Fu | 盛夏和她的未婚夫 | Wei Xuejin | |
| 1985 | Mountain's Daughter | 山的女儿 | Zhu Guangjin | |
| 1985 | Army Nurse | 女儿楼 | Patient | |
| 1986 | Perfect Matches | 情投意合 | Ke Nian | |
| 1988 | The Troubleshooters | 顽主 | Yang Zhong | |
| 1988 | Elope | 私奔 | Gou Li | |
| 1989 | Ballad of the Yellow River | 黄河谣 | Hei Gutou | |
| 1989 | Codename Cougar | 代号美洲豹 | Zheng Xianping | |
| 1990 | The Ozone Layer Vanishes | 大气层消失 | Toushi | |
| 1990 | Peking Duck Restaurant | 老店 | Master Ji | |
| 1990 | Street Knight | 马路骑士 | Boss | |
| 1990 | Someone Falls in Love with Me | 有人偏偏爱上我 | Hairstylist | |
| 1991 | Girl of the Times | 新潮姑娘 | | |
| 1991 | Comic Star | 喜剧明星 | Teacher Ge | |
| 1991 | Steel Meets Fire | 烈火金刚 | Xi Shiguan | |
| 1991 | The Spring Festival | 过年 | Ding Yuan | 15th Hundred Flowers Awards for Best Supporting Actor; 3rd Golden Phoenix Awards for Society Award |
| 1991 | Woman-Taxi-Woman | 女人·TAXI·女人 | Zhang Wenxiu's husband | |
| 1991 | The Tragedy of Comedian | 悲喜人生 | Director | |
| 1992 | After the Final Battle | 决战之后 | Wenqiang | |
| 1992 | Their Marriages | 父子婚事 | Da You | |
| 1992 | Conned Once | 上一当 | Liu Shan | |
| 1992 | Divorce Wars | 离婚大战 | Da Ming | |
| 1993 | The Vanished Woman | 消失的女人 | Shan Liren | |
| 1993 | After Separation | 大撒把 | Gu Yan | 13th Golden Rooster Awards for Best Actor |
| 1993 | Farewell My Concubine | 霸王别姬 | Yuan Shiqing | |
| 1994 | Born Coward | 天生胆小 | Director Guan | |
| 1994 | To Live | 活着 | Xu Fugui | 47th Cannes Film Festival for Best Actor |
| 1996 | The Emperor's Shadow | 秦颂 | Gao Jianli | |
| 1997 | The Dream Factory | 甲方乙方 | Yao Yuan | 21st Hundred Flowers Awards for Best Actor; 5th Beijing College Student Film Festival for Most Popular Actor |
| 1997 | Keep Cool | 有话好好说 | Policeman | |
| 1997 | Eighteen Springs | 半生緣 | Zhu Hongcai | |
| 1998 | Be There or Be Square | 不见不散 | Liu Yuan | |
| 1999 | Sorry Baby | 没完没了 | Han Dong | |
| 1999 | Butterfly Smile | 蝴蝶的微笑 | Kang Ping | |
| 2001 | Big Shot's Funeral | 大腕 | Yoyo | 25th Hundred Flowers Awards for Best Actor; 9th Beijing College Student Film Festival for Most Popular Actor; 2nd Chinese Film Media Awards for Best Actor |
| 2003 | Cala, My Dog! | 卡拉是条狗 | Lao Er | 10th Beijing College Student Film Festival for Most Popular Actor; 4th Chinese Film Media Awards for Best Actor |
| 2003 | Cell Phone | 手机 | Yan Shouyi | 27th Hundred Flowers Awards for Best Actor; 4th Chinese Film Media Awards for Most Popular Actor |
| 2004 | A World Without Thieves | 天下无贼 | Hu Li | |
| 2005 | Suffocation | 窒息 | Chen Xiao | |
| 2006 | The Banquet | 夜宴 | Emperor Li | |
| 2007 | Shi Pin | 十品 | Kou Zhun | |
| 2007 | Shanghai Red | 紅美麗 | Mr. Feng | |
| 2007 | Na Qie | 纳妾 | Old Lee | |
| 2007 | Crossed Lines | 命运呼叫转移 | Lao San | |
| 2008 | Desires of the Heart | 桃花运 | Wang Mang | |
| 2008 | If You Are the One | 非诚勿扰 | Qin Fen | 12th Golden Phoenix Awards for Jury Special Prize |
| 2009 | Gasp | 气喘吁吁 | Li Qiang | |
| 2009 | The Founding of a Republic | 建国大业 | Red Army Fourth Division leader | Cameo |
| 2010 | Sacrifice | 赵氏孤儿 | Cheng Ying | 14th Huabiao Awards for Outstanding Actor; 18th Beijing College Student Film Festival for Best Actor |
| 2010 | Let the Bullets Fly | 让子弹飞 | Tang (Ma Bangde) | 3rd China Film Director's Guild Awards for Best Actor; 11th Chinese Film Media Awards for Best Actor |
| 2010 | If You Are the One 2 | 非诚勿扰2 | Qin Fen | |
| 2013 | Personal Tailor | 私人订制 | Yang Zhong | |
| 2014 | Gone with the Bullets | 一步之遥 | Xiang Feitian | |
| 2016 | The Wasted Times | 罗曼蒂克消亡史 | Mr. Lu | 9th Macau International Movie Festival for Best Actor |
| 2017 | Cook Up a Storm | 决战食神 | Hong Qi | |
| 2018 | Mad Ebriety | 断片之险途夺宝 | Uncle Ya | |
| 2019 | My People, My Country | 我和我的祖国 | Zhang Beijing | Segment: "Hello Beijing" |
| 2019 | Two Tigers | 两只老虎 | Zhang Chenggong | |
| 2020 | My People, My Homeland | 我和我的家乡 | Zhang Beijing | Segment: "Beijing Good People" |
| 2021 | Schemes in Antiques | 古董局中局 | Fu Gui | |
| 2023 | If You are the One 3 | 非诚勿扰3 | Qin Fen | |
| 2024 | The Hedgehog | 刺猬 | Wang Zhantuan | |
| 2024 | The Hutong Cowboy | 爆款好人 | Zhang Beijing | |

=== Television series ===
| Year | English title | Chinese title | Role | Notes |
|---|---|---|---|---|
| 1990 | Fortress Besieged | 围城 | Li Meiting | |
| 1992 | Stories From The Editorial Board | 编辑部的故事 | Li Dongbao | 10th China TV Golden Eagle Award for Best Actor |
| 1992 | Beiyang Fleet | 北洋水师 | He Jing | |
| 1994 | I Love My Family | 我爱我家 | Ji Chunsheng | |
| 1995 | Story of Beijing Tanqiu | 北京深秋的故事 | | |
| 1996 | A Native of Shanghai in Tokyo | 上海人在东京 | Qiu Minghai | |
| 1997 | Kou Laoxi'er | 寇老西儿 | Kou Zhun | |
| 1999 | Divorce | 离婚 | Old Lee | |
