= English (2018 film) =

- Film poster
- Chinese: 英格力士
- Hanyu Pinyin: Yīng Gé Lì Shì
- Directed by: Joan Chen
- Written by: Joan Chen
- Based on: English by Wang Gang
- Produced by: Lai Pan; Shandy Lui Fung-Shan; He Yuwen
- Cinematography: Florian Zinke
- Edited by: Derek Hui; Zhou Xiaolin
- Music by: Peyman Yazdanian
- Production companies: J.Q. Pictures; Er Dong Pictures; Haimo Culture Co.
- Release date: 2018
- Country: China
- Language: Mandarin

English is a Chinese coming-of-age film directed by Joan Chen, based on the novel by Wang Gang. The story is set in the Cultural Revolution. Filming wrapped up in Xinjiang in October 2017.

== Cast ==
- Wang Zhiwen as Father
- Yuan Quan as Mother
- Wang Chuanjun as Wang Yajun (Second Prize Wang)
- Subinur Anwar as Ahjitai
- Huo Siyan
- Qi Yuwu
- Liu Lei
- Alex Guy/盖帝 as Li Laji
- Zhang Zixian
