= English (novel) =

2004 Chinese coming-of-age novel by Wang Gang

- book cover
- Author: Wang Gang
- Translator: Martin Merz, Jane Weizhen Pan
- Language: Chinese
- Set in: Ürümqi, 1970s
- Publication place: China

English (Chinese: 英格力士; pinyin: Yīng Gé Lìshì) is a 2004 Chinese coming-of-age novel by Wang Gang, about a boy growing up during the Cultural Revolution in remote Ürümqi, home to many political exiles including the boy's intellectual parents. English has been translated into English and many other languages.

Wang Gang wrote a sequel in 2012, titled Kashgar (喀什噶尔), which follows the protagonist in his late teens.

The Chinese language title is a phonetic way of representing the word "English" in Chinese for a student of English who is just starting their studies.

== Characters ==
- Love Liu (刘爱, Liu Ai), the protagonist
- Sunrise Huang (黄旭升, Huang Xusheng), Love's classmate
- Garbage Li (李垃圾), real name Li Jianming (李建明), Love's classmate
- Second Prize Wang (王亚军, Wang Yajun), Love's English teacher from Shanghai
  - Ania Spyra of Butler University describes him as having "all-too-Western gentlemanly manners, cologne and luxurious clothes" and which therefore makes other people living in Ürümqi feel afraid.
- Ahjitai (阿吉泰), Love's teacher, who is of mixed Han Chinese and Uyghur ancestry
- Love Liu's father
- Love Liu's mother
- Sunrise Huang's father
- Sunrise Huang's mother
- Principal
- Commander Shen
- Director Fan

== Reception ==
Kirkus Reviews described the work as "a telling, appreciably non-Western narrative enriched by politics and poetry."

Spyra wrote that the decision of the English version to render major character names as translations instead of transliterations " lends the book an aura of an allegory, in the vein of Everyman or The Pilgrim’s Progress", and that the ending "surprises us". She praised the characters for being "fully rounded, vulnerable, and believable."

== Adaptation ==
A film adaptation directed by Joan Chen released in 2018.
