= Wild Beast (novel) =

1991 novel by Wang Shuo

Wild Beast (simplified Chinese: 动物凶猛; traditional Chinese: 動物兇猛; pinyin: Dòngwù Xiōngměng) is a 1991 novel by Wang Shuo.

It tells the story of Ma Xiaojun (马小军; 馬小軍; Mǎ Xiǎojūn), a son of a military official who roams around Beijing during one summer. He falls in love with a young woman named Mi Lan (米兰; 米蘭; Mǐ Lán).

== Adaptations ==
The 1994 film version, titled In the Heat of the Sun, was directed by Wen Jiang.

Chinese artist Song Yang adopted the novel as Wild Animals, a graphic novel. Yen Press published the English version of the graphic novel.
