= If You Are the One 2 =

2010 film by Feng Xiaogang

- Theatrical release poster
- Simplified Chinese: 非诚勿扰2
- Traditional Chinese: 非誠勿擾2
- Hanyu Pinyin: Fēichéng Wùrǎo 2
- Directed by: Feng Xiaogang
- Written by: Feng Xiaogang; Wang Shuo
- Produced by: Wang Zhongjun
- Starring: Ge You; Shu Qi; Sun Honglei; Yao Chen
- Cinematography: Lü Yue
- Production company: Huayi Brothers
- Distributed by: Huayi Brothers
- Release date: December 22, 2010
- Running time: 128 minutes
- Country: China
- Language: Mandarin
- Box office: $76.1 million

If You Are the One 2 (Chinese: 非诚勿扰2) is a 2010 Chinese romantic comedy film directed by Feng Xiaogang. It stars Ge You, Shu Qi, Sun Honglei, and Yao Chen. The film is the second installment in the If You are the One film series and the sequel to If You Are the One (2008). It was released in December 22, 2010.

== Plot ==
After returning from Hokkaido, Xiaoxiao gives up on Mr. Fong and becomes disillusioned with love. Believing he has won her heart, Qin Fen proposes to her at the Mutianyu section of the Great Wall. However, Xiaoxiao remains conflicted. While she finds Qin Fen considerate and amusing, she also sees him as overly emotional and childlike. Most troubling for her is that, despite her efforts, her feelings for him never evolve beyond fondness.

Meanwhile, their close friends, Li Xiangshan and Mang Guo, decide to end their five-year marriage. In a unique gesture, Qin Fen organizes a grand divorce ceremony for them. After the event, a drunken Mang Guo suggests to Xiaoxiao that she try a trial marriage with Qin Fen. Qin Fen and Xiaoxiao travel to Sanya, renting a scenic mountain villa to test their compatibility. Their trial marriage is both comedic and frustrating, but ultimately, Xiaoxiao cannot force herself to love Qin Fen in the way he hopes. One night, after getting drunk, she confesses that her feelings for him are not romantic love.

As they grow distant, Xiaoxiao returns to her job at the airline, while Qin Fen moves back to Beijing. At Li Xiangshan's invitation, he co-hosts a travel show with a Taiwanese woman, Xuanxuan. During this time, he and Xiaoxiao do not cross paths. One day, while dining with Xiangshan, Qin Fen learns that his friend has been diagnosed with a terminal illness. Coincidentally, they run into Mang Guo and Xiaoxiao at the same restaurant, leading to an emotional reunion.

Qin Fen invites Xiangshan's friends and family to Sanya for a farewell gathering. Among those attending are Xiaoxiao, Wusang, Mang Guo and her new partner Li Jianqiang, and Xiangshan's daughter, Chuanchuan. At the gathering, Xiangshan bids farewell to everyone and shares his philosophy with Qin Fen and Xiaoxiao: "No matter how you choose in marriage, it will always be a mistake. A lasting marriage is simply about making peace with that mistake." Following this, Qin Fen accompanies Xiangshan on a boat into the open sea, where Xiangshan ends his life by jumping overboard.

This profound experience of life and death changes Qin Fen's perspective. He proposes to Xiaoxiao once again, and this time, she says yes.

== Cast ==
- Ge You as Qin Fen
- Shu Qi as Liang Xiaoxiao
- Sun Honglei as Li Xiangshan
- Yao Chen as Mang Guo
- Ady An as Xuanxuan
- Liao Fan as Jian Guo
- Zhao Bing as Li Jianqiang
- Zhao Baogang as Zhao Xuehai
- Wu Yicong as Wusang
- Guan Xiaotong as Chuanchuan
- Zhang Hanyu as Narrator
