= Sorry Baby =

- Traditional Chinese: 沒完沒了
- Simplified Chinese: 没完没了
- Hanyu Pinyin: Méiwán méiliǎo
- Directed by: Feng Xiaogang
- Written by: Wang Xiaozhu; Bai Tiejun
- Produced by: Zhang Heping
- Starring: Ge You; Jacklyn Wu; Fu Biao
- Cinematography: Yang Xiaoxiong
- Edited by: Zhou Ying
- Music by: Sanbao
- Release date: 1999
- Running time: 95 minutes
- Country: China
- Language: Mandarin

Sorry Baby (Chinese: 沒完沒了; pinyin: Méiwán méiliǎo) is a 1999 Chinese comedy film directed by Feng Xiaogang, presented by Forbidden City Film, starring Jacklyn Wu, Ge You and Fu Biao. It is one of Feng's Chinese New Year films (hesui pian).

The film tells of the attempts made by a Beijing van driver (Ge You) to obtain his wage arrears from travel agency boss (Fu Biao) - even to the point of kidnapping the latter's Singaporean girlfriend (Jacklyn Wu).

The Chinese title can be translated as “never-ending (persistency)”.

== Plot ==
Freelance Beijing van driver Han Dong (Ge You) has worked for travel agency boss Ruan Dawei (Fu Biao) for over a year. Ruan is always thinking new schemes to make money and keeps delaying Han's wages. When the arrears reaches 98,000 yuan and Ruan refuses to pay, Han kidnaps Ruan's Singaporean girlfriend Xiaoyun (Jacklyn Wu), who is hospitalized in Beijing due to tuberculosis. Ruan is certain Han, a simple, meek fellow, does not have the courage to harm his girlfriend and dares him to kill her over the phone, rejecting a ransom.

Xiaoyun realizes Ruan is putting her life at stake and plots revenge with Han, who has no real intention of harming her, to extort payment from her boyfriend. As time goes by, Han's caring nature is revealed and Xiaoyun discovers he need the money to support a comatose, hospitalized elder sister.

After the police intervenes, Ruan pays up. Han is cleared of all charges since Xiaoyun does not admit to his abduction. Xiaoyun returns to Singapore but reappears miraculously during the 2000 New Year to visit Han, hinting of a future romance between the two.

== Cast ==
- Jacklyn Wu as Liu Xiaoyun (刘小芸)
- Ge You as Han Dong (韩冬)
- Fu Biao as Ruan Dawei (阮大伟)
