= Big Shot's Funeral =

2001 film by Feng Xiaogang

- Film poster
- Simplified Chinese: 大腕
- Hanyu Pinyin: Dàwàn
- Directed by: Feng Xiaogang
- Written by: Li Xiaoming; Shi Kang; Feng Xiaogang
- Produced by: Yang Buting; Wang Zhongjun; Tong Gang; Wang Zhonglei; He Ping
- Starring: Ge You; Rosamund Kwan; Donald Sutherland
- Cinematography: Zhang Li
- Edited by: Zhou Ying
- Music by: San Bao; Faye Wong
- Production companies: Columbia Pictures Film Production Asia; China Film Group Corporation; Huayi Brothers and Taihe Film Investment Co.
- Distributed by: Columbia TriStar Film Distributors International
- Release date: 21 December 2001
- Running time: 100 minutes
- Languages: Mandarin; English
- Budget: $3.3 million

Big Shot's Funeral (Chinese: 大腕; pinyin: Dàwàn; lit. 'Big Wrist', Mandarin colloquialism for "big shot") is a 2001 Chinese black comedy film directed by Feng Xiaogang. It was written by Feng, Li Xiaoming and Shi Kang. The black comedy starred Ge You, Rosamund Kwan and Donald Sutherland.

The film follows a temporary photographer (Ge You), who befriends a famed American film director (Sutherland) and goes to raise money for his friend's funeral after an accident during the shooting of a documentary.

Released on 21 December 2001 as a Chinese New Year film, the film is produced by Huayi Brothers Advertising, Taihe Films, and Columbia Pictures. It marked the fourth collaboration between director Feng Xiaogang and actor Ge You. Despite being panned by critics, the film did modestly at the box office, and won the Best Feature Film Award at China's 25th Hundred Flowers Awards in 2002, while actor Ge You won the Best Actor Award.

== Plot ==
World-renowned American film director Don Tyler (played by Donald Sutherland) is shooting a remake of The Last Emperor in the Forbidden City, Beijing. The director's assistant Lucy, a Chinese American (Rosamund Kwan), hires a Beijing cameraman named YoYo (Ge You) to shoot a "making of" documentary. The director discovers he has ailing health and is booted by the film's producer from the shoot. After witnessing a Chinese funeral for the elderly, Tyler tells YoYo he wants to have a similar "comedy funeral". Soon afterwards, the American director falls into a coma. YoYo is officially allowed to plan Tyler's funeral and he enlists the help of a businessman friend to attract as many sponsors as the funeral process would permit.

Everyone decides to organize a decent funeral to honour the big name director. As a result, Youyou, a laid-off photographer from the film studio, and Louis Wang, a dull and pedantic businessman, take up the job. For a time, the funeral becomes the focus of all media attention, and no one is willing to miss such a great business opportunity. Taylor is taken to the hospital by ambulance, and before leaving, he says to Youyou: "Don't forget, I need a comedy funeral."

The doctor says to Youyou and Lucy, who are standing outside the emergency room, "The patient's life is irreversible, and the family can prepare for the funeral." According to Taylor's wishes, Tony decides to give Youyou the sole discretion of Taylor's funeral. Youyou takes over the job with a chivalrous attitude. He finds help from Louis Wang, an old classmate who owns a performance company and claims to have organized many large-scale concerts. King Louis cannot believe his ears; he slaps Youyou on the shoulder and says, "I'll give you a commission!"

The news of Tyler's death is a rare business opportunity for Tony, the Japanese producer and King Louis. Only Youyou and Lucy face this matter with simple emotions. According to King Louis's plan, Taylor will hold a "rich and colorful program, similar to the Spring Festival Gala, Happy Camp, Happy General Mobilization, and at the same time a little like a disaster relief charity performance. The funeral will be broadcast live on TV to the world."

The more than 3 million funeral expenses for You You and Lucy are not available, but King Louis is very happy. He can find someone to pay, but the person who pays the money has his own request. Therefore, the performance company wants to make the newly signed actress "next to" Taylor famous, and many companies do not hesitate to spend a lot of money to advertise products at the funeral. "Dead Taylor" becomes a money-making machine in their eyes. Just when everyone was dreaming of making a fortune, on this day, Lucy visits Taylor in the ward and is pleasantly surprised to find that Taylor has come back from death. Tony and Taylor decide to block the news and let the "play" continue.

At the advertising auction, the price of funeral advertisements soars, and the solemn portrait of Taylor is also designed as an advertising carrier, rolling from top to bottom like a wave of water, turning into a brightly colored "ridiculous" fitness drink advertisement. Tony and Tyler are leisurely smoking cigars in the hospital, waiting for the outcome of the show. Almost every detail of the funeral is advertised, and every part of Taylor's "body" is fully used. Even the makers of counterfeit products are reluctant to lose this great business opportunity.

When everyone's dream of making a fortune reaches its climax, the news of Taylor's recovery pours on people's heads like a basin of cold water. King Louis could not stand this unexpected blow and becomes mentally ill. Youyou doesn't know how to face the many advertisers and pretends to be sick and is admitted to a mental hospital.

After this farce, You and Lu deepen their understanding of each other and find love. The film ends with the two hugging and kissing.

== Cast ==
- Ge You as Yoyo
- Rosamund Kwan as Lucy
- Paul Mazursky as Tony
- Ying Da as Louie
- Christopher Barden as Peter
- Donald Sutherland as Don Tyler

== Soundtrack ==
"Idiot" (白痴/bái chī) from Faye Wong's 2001 album Faye Wong is the theme song.

== Accolades ==
Award	Ceremony	Category	Recipient(s) and nominee(s)	Result
Hong Kong Film Award	2003	Best Asian Film	Big Shot's Funeral	Nominated
The 25th Hundreds Flowers Award	2002	Best Feature Film	Big Shot's Funeral	Won
The 25th Hundreds Flowers Award	2002	Best actor	Ge You	Won
The 25th Hundreds Flowers Award	2002	Best supporting actor	Ying Da	Won
The 2nd Chinese Film Media Award	2002	Best actor	Ge You	Won
The 2nd Chinese Film Media Award	2002	Best film	Big Shot's Funeral	Nominated
The 2nd Chinese Film Media Award	2002	Best director	Feng Xiaogang	Nominated
The 9th Beijing College Student Film Festival (BCSFF)	2002	Award for best viewing effect	Big Shot's Funeral	Won
The 9th Beijing College Student Film Festival (BCSFF)	2002	Most popular actor for college student	Ge You	Won

== Receptions ==
=== Box office ===
Since 7 January 2002, after only 10 days on-air, the film had already reached 10 million dollars which collected by the box office (only in Beijing). The entire county was 33 million and more.

=== Critical responses ===
The film was panned by critics upon release.
