= Xu Fan =

Chinese actress

- Born: 16 August 1967 (age 59); Wuhan, Hubei, China
- Occupation: Actress
- Years active: 1988–present
- Spouse: Feng Xiaogang (m. 1999)
- Awards: Asian Film Awards – Best Actress; 2011 Aftershock – Li Yuanni Huabiao Awards – Outstanding Actress; 1999 Be There or Be Square; 2011 Aftershock

Chinese name
Transcriptions
Standard Mandarin
- Hanyu Pinyin: Xú Fān
Yue: Cantonese
- Jyutping: Ceoi^{4} Faan^{4}

Xu Fan (Chinese: 徐帆, born 16 August 1967) is a Chinese actress, known for her roles in films such as The Dream Factory (1997), Be There or Be Square (1998), Sigh (2000), Cell Phone (2003), Aftershock (2009), and Back to 1942 (2012).

== Filmography ==
=== Films ===
Year	Title	Role	Notes
1988	Unforgettable Life (特别手術室)	Yang Mei	
1991	Li Lianying: The Imperial Eunuch (大太監李蓮英)	Consort Zhen	
1991	After Separation (大撒把)	Lin Zhouyun	Nominated—Golden Rooster Award for Best Actress
1995	Lost My Love (永失我愛)	Ge Ge	Nominated—Golden Rooster Award for Best Actress
1997	The Dream Factory (甲方乙方)	Tang Lijun	
1997	Spicy Love Soup (愛情麻辣烫)	Chen Jing	
1998	Be There or Be Square (不見不散)	Li Qing	Won—Huabiao Award for Outstanding Actress; Won—Students' Choice Award for Favorite Actress; Nominated—Golden Rooster Award for Best Actress
1999	Crash Landing (緊急迫降)	Qiu Yehua	
1999	The Mirror (怪談之魔鏡)	Mary	
1999	Sorry Baby (沒完沒了)		
1999	Lotus Lantern (寶蓮燈)	Sanshengmu	Voice
2000	Sigh (一聲嘆息)	Song Xiaoying	Won—Students' Choice Award for Favorite Actress; Won—Cairo International Film Festival for Best Actress; Nominated—Golden Rooster Award for Best Supporting Actress
2000	Father (爸爸)	Qi Huaiyuan	Film was made in 1996
2003	Cell Phone (手機)	Shen Xue	Nominated—Hundred Flowers Award for Best Actress
2004	A World Without Thieves (天下無賊)	Mrs. Liu	
2005	Eat Hot Tofu Slowly (心急吃不了熱豆腐)	Yang Qing	
2006	One Foot Off the Ground (雞犬不寧)	Sumei	
2007	Crossed Lines (命運呼叫轉移)		
2009	The Founding of a Republic (建國大業)	Liao Mengxing	
2009	Aftershock (唐山大地震)	Li Yuanni	Won—Asian Film Awards for Best Actress; Won—Huabiao Award for Outstanding Actress; Nominated—Golden Rooster Award for Best Actress; Nominated—Golden Horse Award for Best Actress; Nominated—Asia Pacific Screen Award for Best Performance by an Actress
2010	Major Secretary (第一書記)		
2011	Love in Space (全球熱戀)	Mary Huang	
2012	Back to 1942 (一九四二)	Huazhi	
2012	Full Circle (飛越老人院)		Cameo
2013	Saving General Yang (忠烈楊家將)	She Saihua	
2013	The Rooftop	Jasmine	
2013	I Am Director		
2014	When a Peking Family Meets Aupair		
2014	One Day		
2014	The Assassin		
2016	Railroad Tigers (铁道飞虎)		
2019	A Sweet Life		
2021	Embrace Again (穿过寒冬拥抱你)	Liu Yalan	
2021	All About My Mother (关于我妈的一切)	Ji Peizhen	Won—Golden Lotus Award for Best Actress

=== Television ===
Year	Title	Role	Notes
1995	Chicken Feathers Everywhere (一地雞毛)	Li Jing	
2002	Green Cloth (青衣)	Xiao Yanqiu	Won—Flying Apsaras Award for Outstanding Actress
2006	Zhu Yuanzhang, the Legendary Emperor (傳奇皇帝朱元璋)	Ma Xiuying	
2009	Nation's Physician (大國醫)	Yun Heming	
2018	Win the World	Madame Han	
2026	The Lament of Autumn 玉簟秋	Zhao Baoru	
