= Be There or Be Square =

- Film poster
- Traditional Chinese: 不見不散
- Simplified Chinese: 不见不散
- Hanyu Pinyin: Bújiàn búsàn
- Directed by: Feng Xiaogang
- Written by: Gu Xiaoyang; Feng Xiaogang
- Produced by: Yang Hongguang; Liu Xiaodian
- Starring: Ge You; Xu Fan
- Cinematography: Zhao Fei
- Edited by: Zhou Ying
- Music by: San Bao
- Release date: 1998
- Running time: 103 minutes
- Country: China
- Languages: Mandarin, English

Be There or Be Square (simplified Chinese: 不见不散; traditional Chinese: 不見不散; pinyin: Bújiàn búsàn) is a 1998 Chinese romantic comedy film directed by Feng Xiaogang, produced by Beijing Forbidden City Film Co. Ltd., Beijing Film Studio, Zhongji Modern Commercial, Beijing Zhengtian Media & Culture Centre, and Sleiman/Tyrol Films.

Ge You and Xu Fan star as Beijing natives working in Los Angeles, whose paths constantly cross in a foreign city. They attempt to balance work with friendship/love in spite of mounting disasters each time they meet.

== Plot ==
Freelancer Liu Yuan (Ge You) is a carefree Beijing native seeking out a living in Los Angeles, working as an occasional film extra and part-time insurance agent. While helping a Beijing film crew scout for a suburban mansion, he encounters Li Qing (Xu Fan), a former acquaintance house sitting for a wealthy Taiwanese family. Liu convinces Li Qing she lacks the requisite skills to survive in an American city, and buys her an air ticket to fly back to Beijing. The two part at the airport, expecting never to meet again.

The two run into each other a year later in L.A. As it turns out Li did not leave the U.S.; instead, she now rents a cheap apartment and works as a cleaner. Still his former carefree self living in a travel trailer, Liu has turned to selling cemetery plots. Their relationship seems "jinxed" as the two encounter a hold-up at a restaurant, then the unlucky duo end up arrested by the LAPD after they worked for a traveling agency without realizing it is actually a human smuggling ring in disguise. Li Qing finds their relationship unnerving enough to stop contact, vowing never to meet Liu again.

A year passes. Liu Yuan puts a classified ad in local Chinese language newspaper looking for Li, who now has her own florist shop and is teaching Mandarin part-time to Chinese Americans. Li remembers their relationship fondly and the two set up a Mandarin school for LAPD cops who patrol the LA Chinatown area. Through various mishaps, Liu makes no secret of his romantic interest in Li, but it is only after an elaborate hoax from Liu that Li realizes she values him as well.

However, news arrives from Beijing that Liu's mother has suffered a serious cerebral hemorrhage. Liu heads back to Beijing to fulfill his filial duties and parts with Li, not wanting to pressure her to follow him home as Li has just obtained a green card after years of hard work in the US.

On the airplane heading home, Liu has a troubled dream that he will not see Li again until decades later at an old folks' home. When he wakes up he finds to his delight Li Qing sitting next to him. Just then, the airplane meets with technical mishap and seems to be heading for a crash – another mishap in their long line of "hexed" meet-ups. In the face of imminent death, the couple profess their love for each other, but miraculously, the technical problem is resolved just moments after their mutual love declarations. The two decide to get hitched immediately on landing – but only after Li discovers Liu is sporting dentures after their first kiss.

== Cast ==
- Ge You as Liu Yuan (刘元)
- Xu Fan as Li Qing (李清)

== Box office and award ==
The film is a Feng Xiaogang hesui pian ("New Year celebratory film"), screened during the 1999 Chinese New Year to boost box office takings, and it earned 30M Yuan in theaters. It received the "Best Feature Film - Hua Biao Prize in 1998", awarded to the Beijing Forbidden City Film Co. Ltd., Beijing Film Studio, Zhongji Modern Commercial, Beijing Zhengtian Media & Culture Centre by the China State Administration of Broadcast, Film, & TV in May 1999.
