= Feng Xiaogang =

Chinese film director and actor

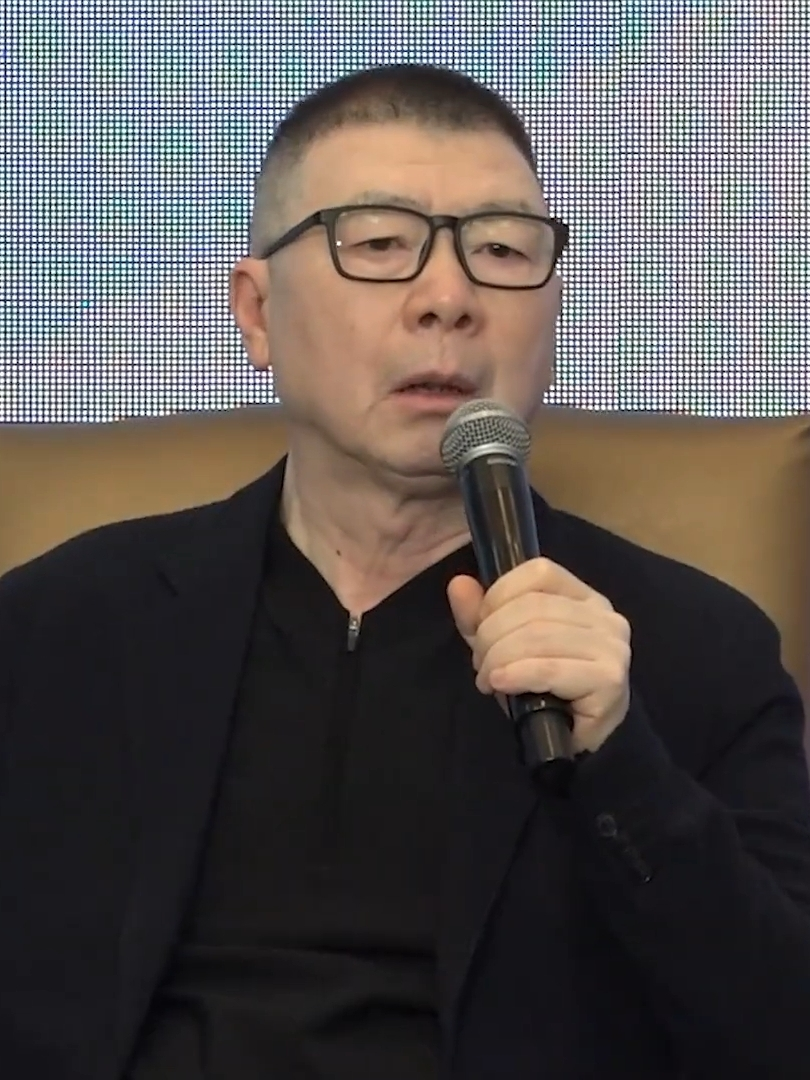
- Feng in 2026
- Born: 18 March 1958 (age 68); Beijing, China
- Occupations: Film director, actor, screenwriter
- Years active: 1984–present
- Agent: Huayi Brothers
- Spouses: Zhang Di (m. 1984; div. 1999) Xu Fan (m. 1999)
- Children: 2
- Awards: Hong Kong Film Awards – Best Asian Film; 2009 Assembly Golden Horse Awards – Best Adapted Screenplay; 2005 A World Without Thieves Best Actor; 2015 Mr. Six Hundred Flowers Awards – Best Director; 2008 Assembly; 2010 If You Are the One

Chinese name
- Traditional Chinese: 馮小剛
- Simplified Chinese: 冯小刚
Transcriptions
Standard Mandarin
- Hanyu Pinyin: Féng Xiǎogāng

Feng Xiaogang (simplified Chinese: 冯小刚; traditional Chinese: 馮小剛; pinyin: Féng Xiǎogāng; born 18 March 1958 in Beijing) is a Chinese filmmaker and actor. After making his directorial debut with the romance film Lost My Love (1994), Feng had three film projects in succession disrupted by Chinese censorship, prompting him to pivot toward comedy. He rose to fame through his collaboration with actor Ge You and played a pivotal role in shaping the Chinese New Year film genre with popular comedies such as The Dream Factory (1997), Be There or Be Square (1998), Sorry Baby (1999), Big Shot's Funeral (2001), and the film series If You Are the One (2008–2023). From the 2000s onward, Feng diversified by directing dramas and epics such as Cell Phone (2003), A World Without Thieves (2004), The Banquet (2006), Assembly (2007), Aftershock (2010), Back to 1942 (2012), I Am Not Madame Bovary (2016), for which he won the Golden Horse Award for Best Director, Youth (2017), and We Girls (2025).

As an actor, Feng mostly appeared in cameo roles. His only two major roles are in Father (2000) and Mr. Six (2015), for the latter of which he won the Golden Horse Award for Best Leading Actor.

== Early life ==
Feng's father, Feng Fei, courtesy name Kongxiu, was born in June 1921 in Yanbu Village, Xiangtan County, Hunan Province. He attended the National Southwest Associated University and served as an officer in Fu Zuoyi's army during the Chinese Civil War before defecting to the Chinese Communist Party. In 1950, Feng Fei graduated from the Department of Western Languages at Peking University and later worked as a professor at several universities in Beijing. Feng's mother was a health doctor at a printing factory in Beijing. Feng Fei and his wife had two children, Feng and his sister Feng Xiaojun.

Feng Xiaogang was born in Dongguanying Hutong, Xicheng District, Beijing. When he was just over a year old, his parents divorced because his father was designated as a "rightist." Feng moved with his mother and sister to an area near her workplace at Beili Street, Chegongzhuang. The family lived in the compound of the Beijing Municipal Party School.

After high school, Feng Xiaogang joined the military and worked as a stage designer for the Beijing Military Region's Cultural and Arts Troupe. In 1977, he began working unofficially for the Propaganda Team of the 6th Armored Division of the 38th Army in Nankou, Changping District, Beijing, entering the unit by borrowing a military uniform after missing the 1977 conscription period. He officially enlisted in 1978. In his autobiography, Feng recalled joining as a trainee in the arts team and being promoted to a Level-23 cadre within three years. However, during the 1984 downsizing of the military initiated by the Central Military Commission, he was discharged, partly due to his romantic relationship with the daughter of a veteran in the drama team. Feng's seven years in the military arts troupe later served as inspiration for his film Youth.

After his discharge, Feng was initially assigned to work in the propaganda department of the Xizhimen Grain Warehouse in Beijing, but he declined the position. He was then offered two options: to continue serving as a staff officer in the Audio-Visual Education Department of the People's Armed Police Academy in Langfang, Hebei, or to transition into civilian life as a trade union officer for the Beijing Urban Construction Development Corporation. Feng chose the latter. In 1985, he joined the Beijing Television Arts Center as an art designer.

== Film career ==
=== 1990s ===
In 1992, Feng collaborated with Zheng Xiaolong on the screenplay for The Dream Factory, which was adapted into a film and earned five nominations at the 13th Golden Rooster Awards, including Best Picture and Best Screenplay. In 1994, he made his directorial debut with Lost My Love, a love tragedy on which he also served as an art designer.

However, following his debut, three films developed by Feng in collaboration with writer Wang Shuo under their production company—The Other Side of the Moon, Father, and Living in Embarrassment—failed to secure approval from censors. The bans contributed to Wang Shuo's temporary marginalisation within the industry and prompted Feng to pivot toward comedy, a comparatively safer genre under prevailing censorship standards. The Other Side of the Moon was later adapted into a television series in 1997, while Father, completed in 1996 but never screened in China, was surreptitiously premiered at the 2000 Locarno International Film Festival, with Wang Shuo credited as director.

Amid the rapid expansion of China's film market, Feng instead found success in comedy, particularly through his collaborations with actor Ge You. Feng established himself as a key figure in the Chinese New Year film genre with a string of box office hits, such as The Dream Factory, Be There or Be Square, and Sorry Baby, Sigh and Big Shot's Funeral. Unlike contemporary directors such as Zhang Yimou and Chen Kaige, who first gained international acclaim before achieving domestic popularity, Feng built his career on commercial success in the mainland Chinese film market.

=== 2000s ===
In 2003, Feng directed Cell Phone, which propelled Fan Bingbing's career as a rising film star.

In 2004, Feng directed A World Without Thieves, based on the novel of the same name by Zhao Benfu. The film starred Andy Lau, Rene Liu, Ge You, Wang Baoqiang, and Li Bingbing. It earned ¥120 million at the domestic box office, making it the third-highest-grossing film of the year, behind Kung Fu Hustle and House of Flying Daggers. Feng won the Golden Horse Award for Best Adapted Screenplay. Wang Baoqiang, playing a pivotal role, became one of the year's breakout stars.

In 2006, Feng directed his first historical film, The Banquet, a reimagining of Shakespeare's Hamlet set during the Five Dynasties and Ten Kingdoms period in China. The film starred Zhang Ziyi, Ge You, Daniel Wu, and Zhou Xun and grossed ¥130 million domestically. Zhou Xun won Best Supporting Actress at the Hong Kong Film Awards for her performance.

In 2007, Feng released the war film Assembly, which earned ¥260 million and propelled Zhang Hanyu to stardom. The film won Best Asian Film at the 28th Hong Kong Film Awards, as well as Best Feature Film and Best Director at the Golden Rooster Awards.

In December 2008, Feng returned to his signature comedic style with If You Are the One, a romantic comedy starring Ge You and Shu Qi. The film became one of the most successful Chinese films of the year and launched a franchise thereafter.

=== 2010s ===
In 2010, Feng directed two major films: Aftershock and If You Are the One 2. Aftershock, an adaptation of Zhang Ling's novel about the 1976 Tangshan earthquake, was the first Chinese IMAX film. Aftershock won Best Film at the 4th Asia Pacific Screen Awards.

In 2011, Feng began preparations for Back to 1942, a historical drama that premiered in November 2012. The film won Best Cross-Strait Chinese Film at the 32nd Hong Kong Film Awards and Best Picture at the 3rd Beijing International Film Festival.

In July 2013, Feng was officially appointed as the chief director of the 2014 CCTV Spring Festival Gala. That same year, he published a collection of personal essays, Trouble Maker, and directed the comedy Personal Tailor. Despite mixed reviews, the film grossed ¥717 million, setting a new box office record for Feng.

In June 2014, Feng's Haikou-based "Feng Xiaogang Movie Town" officially opened. The ¥5.5 billion project spans 93 hectares (230 acres) and features architectural elements inspired by Feng's films, such as Back to 1942 and Aftershock. The site serves as a film production base and commercial entertainment area.

In 2015, Feng was awarded the Knight of the Order of Arts and Letters by the French Ministry of Foreign Affairs. The same year, he served as a judge on Shanghai Dragon TV's comedy show Laugh Out Loud and Zhejiang TV's talent show I See You've Got Talent.

That year, Feng starred as the lead in Guan Hu's film Mr. Six, playing a grizzled Beijing street gangster. His performance won Best Actor at the 52nd Golden Horse Awards and the 23rd Beijing College Student Film Festival, and earned him a nomination for Best Actor at the 10th Asian Film Awards. Feng also produced two films, Only You and Bad Guys Always Die, directed by emerging filmmakers Zhang Hao and Sun Hao, respectively.

In late 2015, Feng began filming I Am Not Madame Bovary, an adaptation of Liu Zhenyun's novel, starring Fan Bingbing. The film premiered in 2016 and won the FIPRESCI Prize at the Toronto International Film Festival and the Golden Shell for Best Film at the San Sebastián International Film Festival. Feng won Best Director at the 53rd Golden Horse Awards and the 10th Asia Pacific Screen Awards. In December, he received a Lifetime Achievement Award at the inaugural Macau International Film Festival. In March 2017, the film won three awards at the 11th Asian Film Awards, including Best Film, Best Actress, and Best Cinematography.

In January 2017, Feng began shooting Youth, adapted from a semi-autobiographical novel by Geling Yan set against the backdrop of the Cultural Revolution and the Sino-Vietnamese War, centered on a military arts troupe. The film, which underwent significant censorship, was released in December 2017, earning ¥1.42 billion at the Chinese box office. The film gained renewed attention in 2025 following its popularity among some Chinese New Left and Maoist audiences, who interpreted it as a coded paean to Wang Hongwen. This reception drew disapproval from both Chinese authorities and Geling Yan, who rejected interpretations of the film as nostalgic for the Cultural Revolution.

In 2018, Feng completed filming Cell Phone 2, a sequel to Cell Phone, which reignited the feud with former television host Cui Yongyuan over the original's alleged insinuations of Cui's real life. Cui retaliated by exposing the use of dual contracts designed to evade taxes, known as "yin-yang contracts," pervasive in the Chinese entertainment industry. The accusations implicated the star of the film, Fan Bingbing, and sent lasting shockwaves through the industry. Several of Feng's companies, including Meila Culture Media, were subsequently liquidated or deregistered. Fan has since been blacklisted by the Chinese government over the use of yin-yang contracts.

In 2019, Feng's company paid nearly ¥70 million in performance compensation due to unmet profit targets set during a 2015 agreement with Huayi Brothers, which had acquired 70% of Dongyang Meila and Zhejiang Dongyang Haohan. In 2019, Feng directed Only Cloud Knows, a romantic drama starring Huang Xuan and Yang Caiyu, reuniting the trio after the success of Youth.

== Personal life ==
Feng's first wife is Zhang Di. They have a daughter, Feng Siyu, who in 2009 was admitted to the Production Management Department at the Beijing Film Academy and later studied at the New York Film Academy.

Feng's second wife is actress Xu Fan, whom he married in 1999. Due to Feng's vitiligo condition, the couple did not have biological children but instead adopted a girl named Duo'er.

== Filmography ==
=== As director ===
| Year | English Title | Chinese Title | Notes/Ref. |
|---|---|---|---|
| 1994 | Lost My Love | 永失我爱 | |
| 1997 | The Dream Factory | 甲方乙方 | |
| 1998 | Be There or Be Square | 不见不散 | |
| 1999 | Sorry Baby | 没完没了 | |
| 2000 | Sigh | 一声叹息 | |
| 2001 | Big Shot's Funeral | 大腕 | |
| 2003 | Cell Phone | 手机 | 27th Hundred Flowers Awards—Best Picture |
| 2004 | A World Without Thieves | 天下无贼 | 42nd Golden Horse Awards—Best Adapted Screenplay |
| 2006 | The Banquet | 夜宴 | |
| 2007 | Assembly | 集结号 | 29th Hundred Flowers Awards—Best Picture; 27th Golden Rooster Awards—Best Picture, Best Director |
| 2008 | If You Are the One | 非诚勿扰 | |
| 2010 | Aftershock | 唐山大地震 | Selected as the Chinese entry for the Best Foreign Language Film at the 83rd Academy Awards |
| 2010 | If You Are the One 2 | 非诚勿扰2 | |
| 2012 | Back to 1942 | 一九四二 | China Film Director's Guild Awards—Best Film, Best Director; Hong Kong Film Award for Best Film from Mainland and Taiwan |
| 2013 | Personal Tailor | 私人订制 | |
| 2016 | I Am Not Madame Bovary | 我不是潘金莲 | 53rd Golden Horse Awards—Best Director |
| 2017 | Youth | 芳华 | |
| 2019 | Only Cloud Knows | 只有芸知道 | |
| 2023 | If You Are the One 3 | 非诚勿扰3 | |
| 2025 | We Girls | 向阳·花 | |
| 2026 | I Know Who You Are | 抓特务 | |

=== As writer ===
| Year | English Title | Chinese Title | Notes |
|---|---|---|---|
| 1992 | After Separation | 大撒把 | |
| 1994 | A Born Coward | 天生胆小 | |
| 1997 | The Dream Factory | 甲方乙方 | |
| 2001 | Big Shot's Funeral | 大腕 | |
| 2004 | A World Without Thieves | 天下无贼 | 42nd Golden Horse Awards—Best Adapted Screenplay |
| 2008 | If You Are the One | 非诚勿扰 | |
| 2010 | If You Are the One 2 | 非诚勿扰2 | |

=== As actor ===
| Year | English Title | Chinese Title | Role | Notes |
|---|---|---|---|---|
| 1994 | In the Heat of the Sun | 阳光灿烂的日子 | Mr. Hu | |
| 1997 | The Dream Factory | 甲方乙方 | | |
| 2000 | Father | 冤家父子 | Ma Linsheng | |
| 2001 | The Marriage Certificate | 谁说我不在乎 | | |
| 2004 | Kung Fu Hustle | 功夫 | Crocodile Gang Boss | |
| 2005 | Wait 'Til You're Older | 童梦奇缘 | Drifter | |
| 2007 | Trivial Matters | 破事儿 | Marketing Officer for Assassins Group | |
| 2009 | The Founding of a Republic | 建国大业 | Du Yuesheng, Boss of the Shanghai Green Gang | |
| 2010 | True Legend | 苏乞儿 | Cameo | |
| 2010 | Let the Bullets Fly | 让子弹飞 | Private adviser | |
| 2012 | The Monkey King: Uproar in Heaven | 大闹天宫 | | |
| 2015 | Mr. Six | 老炮儿 | Liu Ye | 23rd Beijing College Student Film Festival—Best Actor. China Film Director's Guild Awards—Best Actor. Chinese Film Media Awards—Best Actor. 52nd Golden Horse Awards—Best Actor. |
| 2016 | Rock Dog | 摇滚藏獒 | Germur | Voice acting role |
