= The Dream Factory (film) =

- Film poster
- Directed by: Feng Xiaogang
- Written by: Feng Xiaogang; Wang Gang
- Based on: Ni bushi yige suren (You're No Common Person) by Wang Shuo
- Produced by: Lu Guoqiang
- Edited by: Zhou Ying
- Production companies: Beijing Forbidden City Film; Beijing Film Studio
- Release date: 20 December 1997
- Running time: 90 minutes
- Country: China
- Language: Mandarin
- Budget: 6 million yuan (830 thousand US dollars)
- Box office: 36 million yuan

The Dream Factory (Chinese: 甲方乙方; pinyin: Jiǎfāng Yǐfāng; lit. 'Party A', 'Party B') is a 1997 Chinese comedy film directed by Feng Xiaogang. It was one of the first notable and successful he sui pian movies (Chinese New Year films) made in mainland China. It was written by Feng Xiaogang and Wang Gang, adapting a Wang Shuo novel.

== Plot ==
Four friends in Beijing—three men and a woman—start a company which specializes in fulfilling their clients' dreams. They encounter many oddball clients along the way.
