= Wang Shuo =

Chinese writer

Wang Shuo (王朔)
- 王朔
- Born: August 23, 1958 (age 68); Nanjing, China
- Occupations: novelist, short story writer, screenwriter, columnist, voice actor
- Writing career
- Period: 1980s–present
- Genres: novel, satire, romance, comedy detective fiction
- Notable works: Don't Call Me Human, Playing for Thrills
- Literary movement: Post 70s Generation, "Hooligan Literature"

Wang Shuo (Chinese: 王朔; pinyin: Wáng Shuò, born August 23, 1958) is a Chinese writer. A leading figure in "hooligan literature" (痞子文学) and the New Beijing School of Chinese literature, he was influential in the 1980s and 1990s, known for his cynical, irreverent style and use of Beijing colloquialisms.

== Background ==
Wang grew up in an army compound in Beijing. His family was of Manchu ancestry. When he was an adolescent, his parents were sent to the countryside as part of the Cultural Revolution, leaving him and his brother alone in Beijing among other children whose parents were also away. He joined the navy as a medical assistant, where he spent four years before pursuing a career as a writer.

Wang's novels avoid (or in the words of academic Richard Kurt Craus, "even disdain") politics. In 1997, Wang stated:

There's a very famous dissident named Liu Xiaobo, who tried to persuade me to protest and make petitions and collect signatures. I refused. Now Liu is in a labor camp, and I am here. I was proved right. A writer is a writer. He should stay away from politics.

== Reception ==
Wang is widely considered to be one of China's most popular and easily recognizable authors, and has been applauded by literary critics. Wang's works have often been best-sellers. His novels tell the story of tough working class life in Beijing. In his writing style, Wang has focused on the "living language" which is spoken by ordinary people in the street. He has also used a lot of the Beijing dialect, which makes his works very vivid and attractive.

The New York Times Book Review contributor Sheryl WuDunn compares Wang to Western literary figures such as Joseph Heller, and Kurt Vonnegut, described Wang as "China's Kerouac". Chinese author Dai Qing has been quoted as describing Wang as "one of the finest contemporary writers, someone who can use wit and language to betray several decades of ideology that have been forced upon us, but the Government doesn't fear him because while he destroys, he doesn't create or build. And he is willing to compromise with the Government". Historian Christopher Rea writes that Wang's devil-may-care persona and advocacy of wan'r (playing, messing around) echoes the playful, and at times cynical, tone of some early twentieth-century Chinese literature.

Wang is described by some traditional Chinese critics as a "spiritual pollutant" for his hooligan style of writing. His work describes the culturally confused generation after the Cultural Revolution, marked by rebellious behavior. During the 1990s Wang was the most popular and famous writer in China. Despite his hooligan style, his collected works were never banned and only one film based on his novels was not allowed to be shown in China until 2004, not because of his political stance, but rather due to his style. Wang is a national bestseller in China and has influenced generations of Chinese readers. With over 20 novels and 10 million copies in print, Wang's influence ranges from students to workers, and from drifters to intellectuals. His works mark the beginning of a new writing style in China, influencing many new authors. His satire is less of a direct confrontation with the Communist autocracy than it is a mockery of their lack of cool and a statement of utter indifference to any political or nationalistic correctness.

Many of Wang's works have been officially banned within the People's Republic of China. Chinese authorities have labelled Wang's works as being "vulgar" and "reactionary", culminating in a four-volume collection being officially censored, and removed two TV series which he wrote.

== Works ==
=== Novels ===
- Stewardess 《空中小姐》(1984)
- Hot and Cold, Measure for Measure 《一半是火焰，一半是海水》 (1986)
- Masters of Mischief, or The Operators 《顽主》 (1987)
- Samsara 《轮回》 (1988)
- Playing for Thrills 《玩儿的就是心跳》 (1989)
- No Regrets About Youth 《青春无悔》 (1991)
- Wild Beast 《动物凶猛》(1991)
- The Vanished Woman 《消失的女人》 (1993)
- Gone Forever with My Love 《永失我爱》 (1994)
- Please Don't Call Me Human 《千万别把我当人》 (1989)
- A Conversation with Our Daughter 《和我们的女儿谈话》(2008)

=== Filmography ===
==== As director ====
- Father (《爸爸》) (2000)

==== Screenplays ====
- The Troubleshooters (《顽主》) (1988)
- Samsara (《轮回》) (1988)
- No Regrets About Youth (《青春无悔》) (1991)
- In the Heat of the Sun (《阳光灿烂的日子》) (1994) – based on the novel Wild Beast
- Father (2000) – based on the novel Wo shi ni baba(《我是你爸爸》 I am your papa)
- Love the Hard Way (2001) – based on the novel Yi Ban Shi Huo Yan, Yi Ban Shi Hai Shui(《一半是火焰，一半是海水》Half flame, half sea water)
- I Love You (《我爱你》) (2002)
- Little Red Flowers (《看上去很美》) (2006) – based on novel "Could be Beautiful"
- Dreams May Come (《梦想照进现实》) (2006)
- Personal Tailor (2013)
