= Beijing College Student Film Festival =

Annual event in Beijing, China

- Location: Beijing, China
- Founded: 1993
- Language: Chinese
- Website: www.bcsff.cn

Beijing College Student Film Festival
- Traditional Chinese: 北京大學生電影節
- Simplified Chinese: 北京大学生电影节
Transcriptions
Standard Mandarin
- Hanyu Pinyin: Běijīng Dàxuéshēng Diànyǐngjié

Beijing College Student Film Festival, first held in 1993, is an annual event organized by Beijing Normal University and Beijing Municipal Bureau of Radio, Film and Television. It is held in April or May, and is one of the biggest film festivals in China, along with Shanghai International Film Festival and Changchun Film Festival.

It awards several "Flying Tiger" Awards (Chinese: 飞虎) for jury award and students' choice award categories. The "favorite" categories always be the last announced in each ceremony.

== Awards categories ==
Jury Award

Jury composed by college students, teachers, and film reviewers in Beijing.

- Best Film
- Best Director
- Best Screenplay
- Best Actor
- Best Actress
- Best Newcomer
- Best Visual Effect
- Best Directorial Debut
- Grand Jury Prix

Students' Choice Award

National wide college students online votes (80% weight) and festival screenings (Beijing, Shanghai etc.) tickets votes (20% weight).

- Favorite Actor
- Favorite Actress
- Favorite Director

== Major Award Winners ==
Year	#	Best Film	Best Director	Best Actor	Best Actress
1993	1st	San Mao Joins the Army; Stand Up, Don't Bend Over		Hu Yajie for Old-Mother Soil	Xi Meijuan for Jiang Zhuying
1994	2nd	Back to Back, Face to Face; Family Scandal		Niu Zhenhua for Back to Back, Face to Face	Ding Jiali for No More Applause
1995	3rd	The Accused Uncle Shangang	Li Shaohong for Red Powder	Li Rentang for The Accused Uncle Shangang	
1996	4th	The Day the Sun Turned Cold; On the Beat		Zhu Xu for The King of Masks	Ning Jing for The Bewitching Braid
1998	5th	Genghis Khan	Zhang Yang for Spicy Love Soup	Wang Xueqi for Red Suit	Ai Liya for Genghis Khan
1999	6th	Not One Less	Teng Wenji for Rhapsody of Spring	Teng Rujun for Postmen in the Mountains	Tao Hong (born 1972) for A Beautiful New World
2000	7th	Something About Secret	Lu Xuechang for A Lingering Face	Jiang Wu for Shower	Jiang Shan for Something About Secret
2001	8th	A Love of Blueness	Xia Gang for As Light as Glass	Zhang Guoli for Sigh	Yuan Quan for A Love of Blueness
2002	9th	The Dream of a Young Soldier	Huang Jianxin for Who Cares	Fu Biao for Escort	Hu Ke for Chat
2003	10th	Cala, My Dog!	Sun Zhou for Zhou Yu's Train	Sun Honglei for Zhou Yu's Train	Ni Ping for Pretty Big Feet
2004	11th	Nuan	Zheng Dongtian for My Bitter Sweet Taiwan	Fan Wei for The Parking Attendant In July	Yu Nan; The Story of Ermei
2005	12th	A Story of Dun Zi	Lu Chuan for Kekexili: Mountain Patrol	Xia Yu for Waiting Alone	Zhang Jingchu for Huayao Bride In Shangri-la
2006	13th	The Forest Ranger	Zhang Yuan for Little Red Flowers	Pu Cunxin for A Bright Moon	Ni Ping for Loach is Fish Too
2007	14th	The Knot	Ning Hao for Crazy Stone	Li Yixiang for One Foot Off the Ground	Siqin Gaowa for The Postmodern Life of My Aunt
2008	15th	Assembly	Feng Xiaogang for Assembly	Zhang Hanyu for Assembly	Miao Pu for Phoenix Red
2009	16th	Forever Enthralled	Zhang Jiarui for Red River	Donnie Yen for Ip Man	Zhou Xun for The Equation of Love and Death
2010	17th	The Message	Wang Quan'an for Apart Together	Huang Bo for Cow	Tao Hong (born 1969) for Death Dowry
2011	18th	Aftershock	Huo Jianqi for The Seal of Love	Ge You for Sacrifice	Fan Bingbing for Buddha Mountain
2012	19th	Mr. Tree	Gu Changwei for Love for Life	Li Xuejian for Yang Shanzhou	Liang Jing for Son of the Stars
2013	20th	Back to 1942	Guan Hu for Design of Death	Huang Bo for Design of Death	Yan Bingyan for Feng Shui
2014	21st	Einstein and Einstein	Diao Yinan for Black Coal, Thin Ice	Nick Cheung for Unbeatable	Tang Wei for Finding Mr. Right
2015	22nd	Dearest	Jean-Jacques Annaud for Wolf Totem	Qin Hao for Blind Massage	Zhao Wei for Dearest; Tao Hong for Forgetting to Know You
2016	23rd	The Final Master	Jia Zhangke for Mountains May Depart	Feng Xiaogang for Mr. Six	Bai Baihe for Go Away Mr. Tumor
2017	24th	The Wasted Times	Feng Xiaogang for I Am Not Madame Bovary	Zhang Yi for Cock and Bull	Wan Qian for The Insanity
2018	25th	Operation Red Sea	Feng Xiaogang for Youth	Chang Chen for Brotherhood of Blades 2	Zhou Xun for Our Time Will Come
2019	26th	The Wandering Earth	Wen Muye for Dying to Survive	Xu Zheng for Dying to Survive	Yao Chen for Lost, Found
2020	27th				
2021	28th				
2022	29th				

== See also ==
- List of film festivals in China
