= 10th Beijing College Student Film Festival =

2003 film festival in Beijing, China

The 10th Beijing College Student Film Festival was held in 2003 in Beijing, China. Zhou Yu's Train was the biggest winner, receiving three awards, including Best Director, Best Actor, and Favorite Actress.

== Awards ==
- Best Film Award: Cala, My Dog!
- Best Director Award: Sun Zhou for Zhou Yu's Train
- Best Actor Award: Sun Honglei for Zhou Yu's Train
- Best Actress Award: Ni Ping for Pretty Big Feet
- Best Visual Effects Award: Hero
- Best First Film Award: Ma Xiaoying for Gone Is the One Who Held Me Dearest in the World
- Favorite Actor Award: Ge You for Cala, My Dog!
- Favorite Actress Award: Gong Li for Zhou Yu's Train, Zhou Xun for Where Have All the Flowers Gone
- Favorite Film: Eyes of a Beauty
- Artistic Exploration Award: Chicken Poets
- Grand Prix Award: Together with You, When Ruo Ma was Seventeen
- Committee Special Award: Deng Xiaoping, Jing Tao Hai Lang, Gada Meilin
- Best Child Actor Award: Zhang Yan for Warm Spring
- Special Award for National Spirit: Jing Tao Hai Lang
- Outstanding Contribution to Chinese Cinema Award: Zhang Yimou
