= 4th Asia Pacific Screen Awards =

- Date: 2010
- Site: Australia

Highlights
- Best Film: Aftershock
- Best Actor: Chen Daoming
- Best Actress: Yoon Jeong-hee
- Most nominations: Aftershock (6)

The 4th Asia Pacific Screen Awards were held in 2010.

== Awards ==
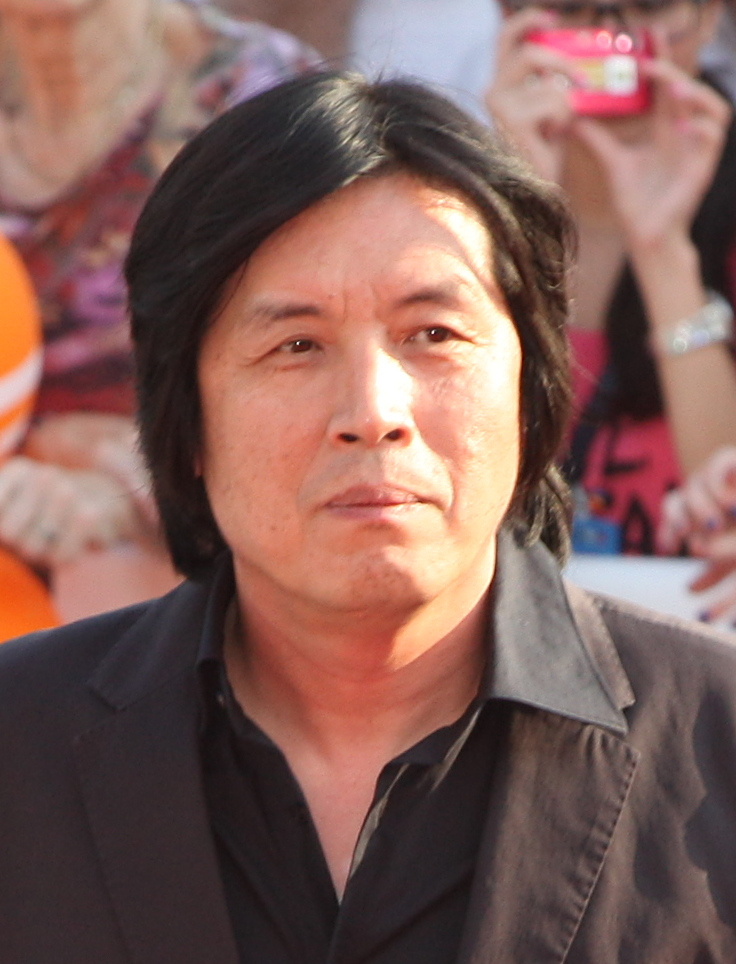
Lee Chang-dong, Achievement in Directing winner.

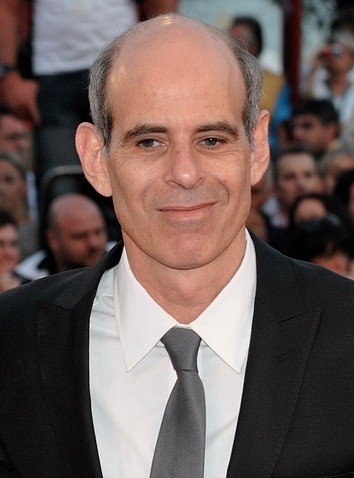
Samuel Maoz, Best Screenplay winner.

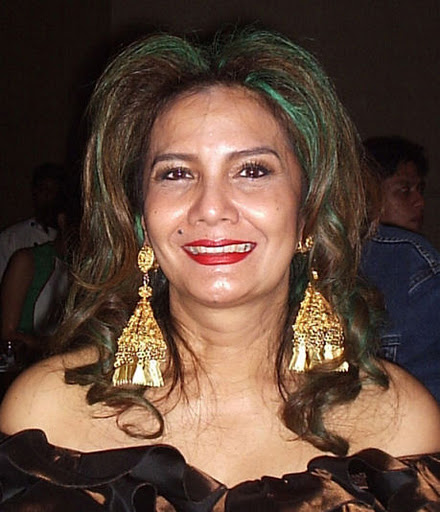
Christine Hakim, FIAPF Award winner.

Best Feature Film	Achievement in Directing
(China) Aftershock: (Turkey) Honey; (South Korea) Poetry; (Taiwan) Monga; (South Korea) Paju	(South Korea) Lee Chang-dong - Poetry: (China) Doze Niu - Monga; (Turkey) Semih Kaplanoğlu - Honey; (China) Wang Quan'an - Weaving Girl; (China) Feng Xiaogang - Aftershock
Best Actor	Best Actress
(China) Chen Daoming - Aftershock: (India) Atul Kulkarni - Natarang; (Russia) Sergei Puskepalis - How I Ended This Summer; (Australia) Tony Barry - Home by Christmas; (Israel) Mark Ivanir - The Human Resources Manager	(South Korea) Yoon Jeong-hee - Poetry: (China) Yu Nan - Weaving Girl; (China) Xu Fan - Aftershock; (India) Tejaswini Pandit - Mee Sindhutai Sapkal; (South Korea) Seo Woo - Paju
Best Screenplay	Best Cinematography
(Israel) Samuel Maoz - Lebanon: (Israel) Nir Bergman - Intimate Grammar; (South Korea) Lee Chang-dong - Poetry; (Japan) Hisako Kurosawa, Masao Adachi - Caterpillar; (China) Su Xiaowei - Aftershock	(India) Sudheer Palsane - The Well: (Turkey) Barış Özbiçer - Honey; (China) Lü Yue - Aftershock; (Taiwan) Jake Pollock - Mengjia; (India) Santosh Sivan, V. Manikandan - Raavan
Best Animated Feature Film	Best Documentary Feature Film
(China) Piercing I: (Australia) Legend of the Guardians: The Owls of Ga'Hoole; (Japan) Oblivion Island: Haruka and the Magic Mirror; (Japan) Mai Mai Miracle; (Japan) King of Thorn	(China) Last Train Home: (Israel) Budrus; (Cambodia) Enemies of the People; (China) Karamay; (Lebanon) 12 Angry Lebanese: The Documentary
Best Youth Feature Film	UNESCO Award
(Iran) The Other: (New Zealand) Boy; (India) Udaan; (Hong Kong) Echoes of the Rainbow; (Australia) Bran Nue Dae	(Turkey) Honey
FIAPF Award	Jury Grand Prize
(Indonesia) Christine Hakim	(Japan) Shinobu Terajima - Caterpillar (Israel) Lebanon

=== Films and countries with multiple nominations ===
Films that received multiple nominations
Nominations	Film
6	Aftershock
4	Honey
4	Poetry
2	Caterpillar
2	Lebanon
2	Monga
2	Paju
2	Weaving Girl

Countries that received multiple nominations
Awards	Country
12	China
6	South Korea
5	India
5	Israel
5	Japan
4	Turkey
3	Australia
2	Taiwan
