= 57th Berlin International Film Festival =

2007 film festival in Berlin, Germany

- Festival poster
- Opening film: La Vie En Rose
- Closing film: Angel
- Location: Berlin, Germany
- Founded: 1951
- Awards: Golden Bear: Tuya's Marriage
- No. of films: 305 films
- Festival date: 8–18 February 2007
- Website: Website

Berlin International Film Festival chronology
- 58th 56th

The 57th Berlin International Film Festival was held from 8 to 18 February 2007. The opening film of this year's festival was Olivier Dahan’s La Vie En Rose. Angel by François Ozon served as the closing night film. American director Paul Schrader was the jury president of the main competition.

The Golden Bear was awarded to the Chinese film Tuya's Marriage directed by Wang Quan'an. 224,181 tickets of the festival were sold.

The festival held a Retrospective programme about women in silent era films. The films which were shown in the retrospective included a restored colour version of the 1921 film Hamlet, starring Asta Nielsen, the 1914 Italian film Cabiria and Berlin Alexanderplatz.

== Juries ==
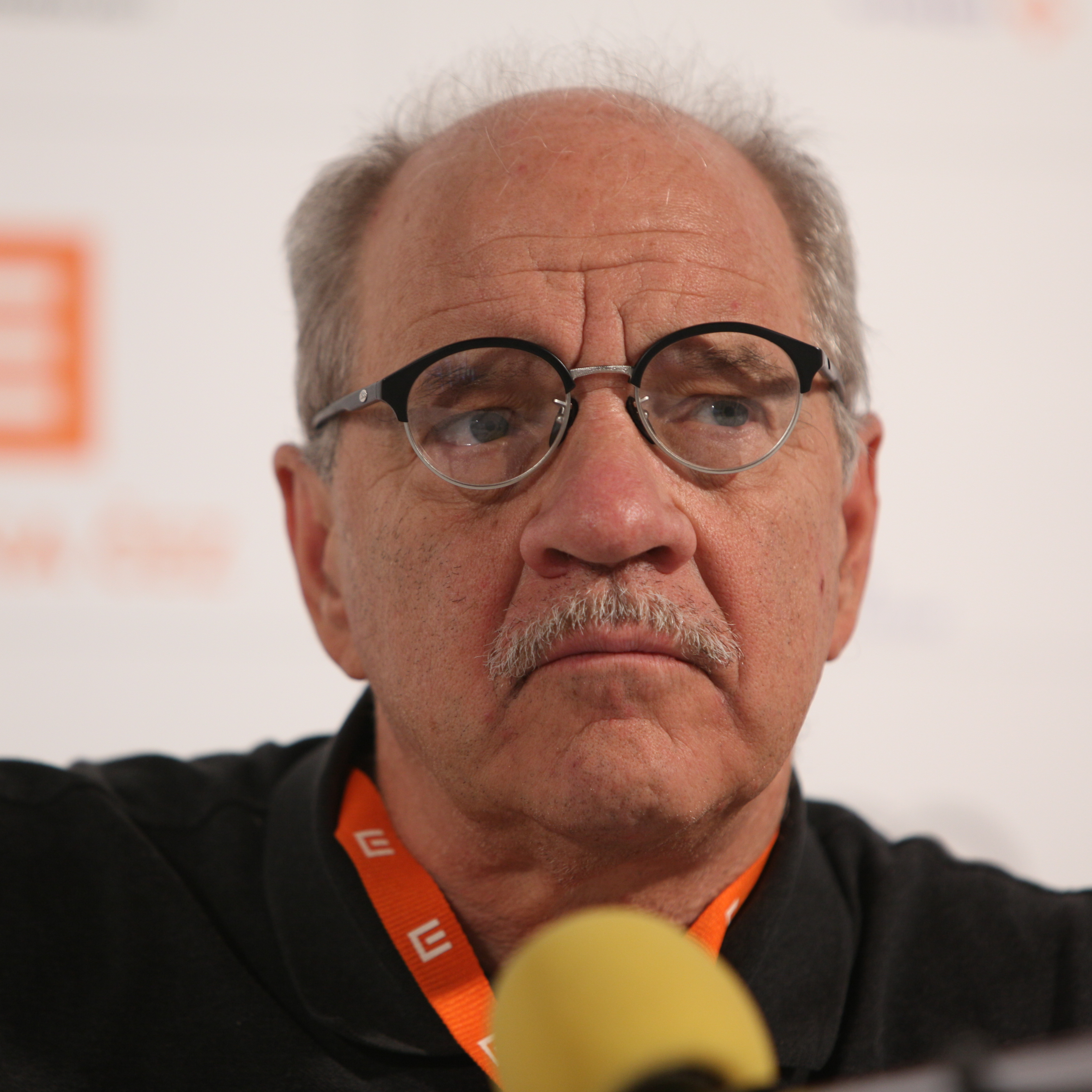
Paul Schrader, Jury President

The following people were announced as being on the jury for the festival:

=== Main Competition ===
- Paul Schrader, American director and screenwriter - Jury President
- Hiam Abbass, Palestinian actress and director
- Mario Adorf, German actor
- Willem Dafoe, American actor
- Gael García Bernal, Mexican actor, director and producer
- Nansun Shi, Hong Kong producer
- Molly Malene Stensgaard, Danish editor

=== Best First Feature Award ===
- Judy Counihan, British producer
- Niki Karimi, Iranian actress
- Gerhard Meixner, German producer

=== Short Film Competition ===
- Peace Anyiam-Fiberesima, Nigerian producer
- Riina Sildos, Estonian producer
- Ning Ying, Chinese director, screenwriter and producer

== Official Sections ==
=== Main Competition ===
The following films were selected in competition for the Golden Bear and Silver Bear awards:

English title	Original title	Director(s)	Country
Angel	The Real Life of Angel Deverell	François Ozon	United Kingdom, France, Belgium
Beaufort	בופור	Joseph Cedar	Israel
Bordertown		Gregory Nava	United States, United Kingdom
The Counterfeiters	Die Fälscher	Stefan Ruzowitzky	Austria, Germany
Desert Dream	경계	Zhang Lü	South Korea, France
The Duchess of Langeais	Ne touchez pas la hache	Jacques Rivette	France
Goodbye Bafana		Bille August	South Africa, United Kingdom, France, Germany, Belgium, Italy, Luxembourg
The Good German		Steven Soderbergh	United States
The Good Shepherd		Robert De Niro	United States
Hallam Foe		David Mackenzie	United Kingdom
I'm a Cyborg, But That's OK	싸이보그지만 괜찮아	Park Chan-wook	South Korea
In Memory of Me	In memoria di me	Saverio Costanzo	Italy
Irina Palm		Sam Garbarski	Belgium, Luxembourg, United Kingdom, Germany, France
I Served the King of England	Obsluhoval jsem anglického krále	Jiří Menzel	Czech Republic, Slovakia
La Vie En Rose	La Môme	Olivier Dahan	France, Canada
Lost in Beijing	苹果	Li Yu	China
The Other	El otro	Ariel Rotter	Argentina, France, Germany
Tuya's Marriage	圖雅的婚事	Wang Quan'an	China
When a Man Falls in the Forest		Ryan Eslinger	United States, Canada
The Witnesses	Les Témoins	André Téchiné	France
The Year My Parents Went on Vacation	O Ano em Que Meus Pais Saíram de Férias	Cao Hamburger	Brazil, Argentina
Yella		Christian Petzold	Germany

== Official Awards ==
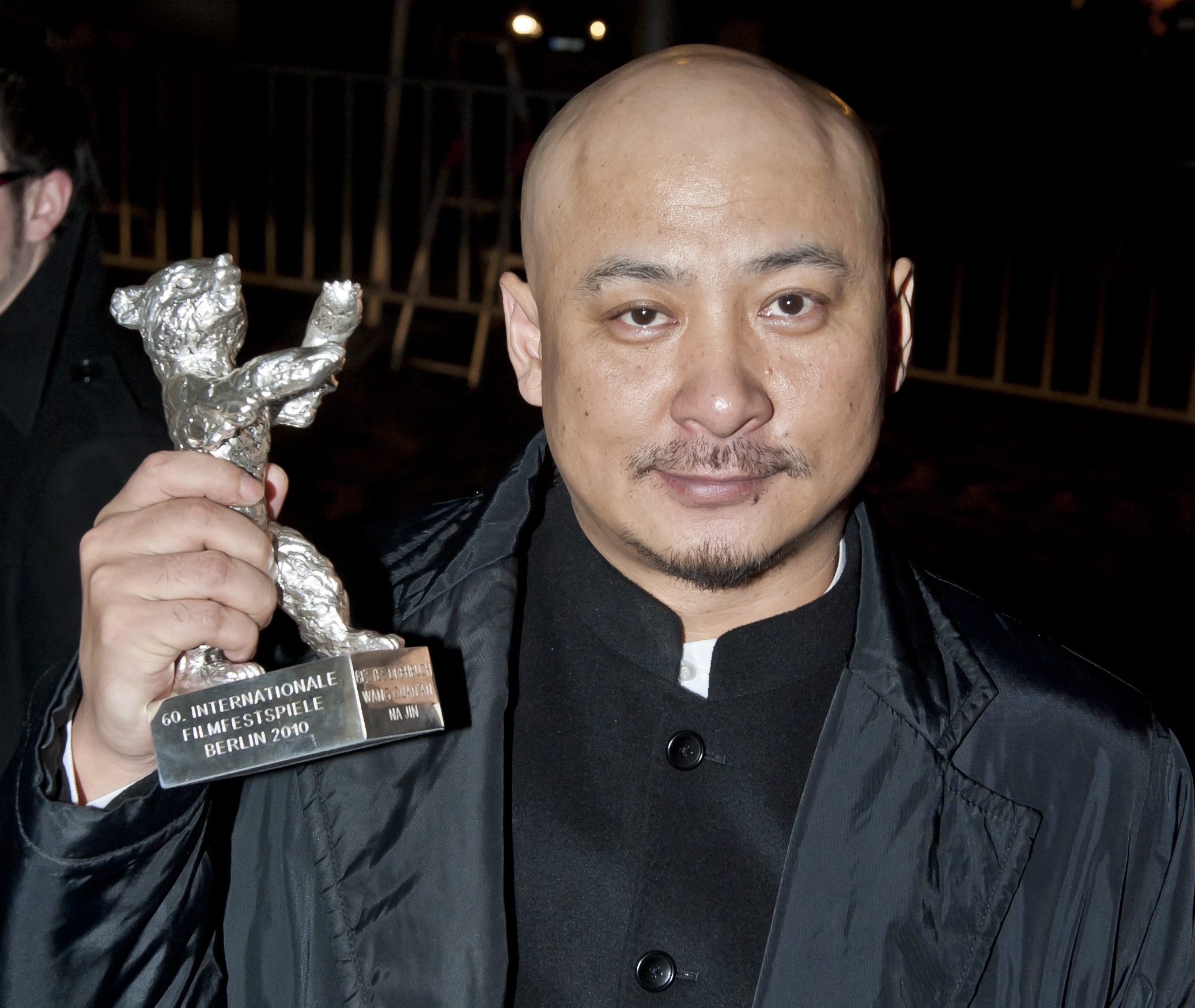
Wang Quan'an, winner of the Golden Bear at the festival

The following awards were presented at the festival.

=== Main Competition ===
- Golden Bear: Tuya's Marriage by Wang Quan'an.
- Silver Bear Grand Jury Prize: Ariel Rotter for The Other
- Silver Bear for Best Director: Joseph Cedar for Beaufort
- Silver Bear for Best Actor: Julio Chávez for The Other
- Silver Bear for Best Actress: Nina Hoss for Yella
- Silver Bear for Best Music: David Mackenzie for Hallam Foe
- Silver Bear for Outstanding Artistic Contribution: For the Ensemble Cast of The Good Shepherd
- Alfred Bauer Prize: Park Chan-wook for I'm a Cyborg, But That's OK
- FIPRESCI Award: I Served the King of England by Jiří Menzel
- Best First Feature: Vanaja by Rajnesh Domalpalli
