= Tobgyal =

Chinese-Tibetan actor (born 1958)

- Born: May 1, 1953 (age 73); Kardak Township, Cona County, Tibet Autonomous Region, China
- Education: Shanghai Theatre Academy
- Occupation: Actor
- Years active: 1988–present

Chinese name
- Traditional Chinese: 多布傑
- Simplified Chinese: 多布杰
Transcriptions
Standard Mandarin
- Hanyu Pinyin: Duōbùjié

Tobgyal (Tibetan: སྟོབས་རྒྱལ།, born May 1958), also called Duobujie (Chinese: 多布杰), is a Chinese actor of Tibetan descent, best known in film for portraying a tribal chief in Red River Valley (1997), Ri Tai in Kekexili: Mountain Patrol (2004), and Zhan Tiejun in No Man's Land (2013). He is a National Class-A Actor. He is a member of the China Theater Association and China Film and Television Association.

== Early life and education ==
Tobgyal was born in Kardak Township, Cona County, Tibet Autonomous Region, China, in May 1953. In 1972, during the middle of the Cultural Revolution, his grandparents sent him to a propaganda team. As a youth, he had his first on stage experience by reciting Quotations from Chairman Mao Tse-tung in a theater in Tibet. Two years later, he returned home to be a farmer. In 1976, at the age of 18, he became a coal miner in Shigatse. At the end of that year, Tobgyal was elected as a trainee in the Tibet Autonomous Region Drama Troupe. He was sent to Shanghai Theatre Academy to study acting on government scholarships. On the graduation ceremony, he played as Romeo in Romeo and Juliet, a tragedy written by William Shakespeare early in his career about two young star-crossed lovers whose deaths ultimately reconcile their feuding families.

== Acting career ==
Tobgyal made his film debut in Mysteries of the Potala Palace (1988), playing a Khenpo.

In 1995, he had key supporting role in Snow Tremor as Gonpo, which earned him an Outstanding Supporting Actor Award at the Flying Apsaras Awards.

Tobgyal earned critical acclaim for his performance as a tribal chief in Red River Valley (1996) by Feng Xiaoning, for which he received a Best Supporting Actor nomination at the Golden Rooster Awards.

Tobgyal has made a number of guest appearances on other television shows, including Tibet Situation, Princess Wencheng, Once Upon a Time in Lhasa, When All Is Said And Done, The Living Buddha, Tea-Horse Road, and Snow Territory Day Road.

In 2002, for his role as Luosang Danzeng in Flower of Happiness, he won a Best Actor Award at the Courser Award.

Tobgyal rose to fame after portraying Ri Tai in Lu Chuan's Kekexili: Mountain Patrol (2004), which garnered him Golden Horse Award, Chinese Film Media Award and Golden Rooster Award nominations for Best Actor.

In 2006, he was cast as Crowe Anglo in Prince of the Himalayas, directed by Hu Xuehua and starring Purba Rgyal.

In 2011, Tobgyal portrayed Feng Guozhang, a warlord in the Republic of China (1912-1949), in 1911. That same year, he appeared in Yu Rongguang's The Mu Saga, a historical television series starring Ray Lui, Choo Ja-hyun, Yu Rongguang and Pan Hong.

In 2014, Tobgyal landed a key supporting role on No Man's Land playing role of Zhan Tiejun opposite actors Xu Zheng, Yu Nan and Huang Bo. He received Chinese Film Media Award nomination for Best Supporting Actor.

In 2017, he starred in an epic film called The Chainbreakers with Lobsang Namdak, Wang Ziyi, Yang Xiucuo and Ngawang Rinchen. The film premiered at the Shanghai International Film Festival on June 21, 2017, and opened in China on December 8, 2017.

== Filmography ==
=== Film ===
Year	English title	Chinese title	Role	Notes
1988	Mysteries of the Potala Palace	布达拉宫秘史	a Khenpo	
1996	Red River Valley	红河谷	Tribal chief	
1996	The Yi-Hai Alliance	彝海结盟	Xiao Yedan	
2002	Red Snow	极地营救	Zeng Ruipu	
2004	Kekexili: Mountain Patrol	可可西里	Ri Tai	
2006	Prince of the Himalayas	喜玛拉雅王子	Crowe Anglo	
2011	1911	辛亥革命	Feng Guozhang	
2013	No Man's Land	无人区	Zhan Tiejun	
2017		酥油		
2017	The Chainbreakers	金珠玛米		
2017	Lord of Shanghai	上海王	General Lu	
2018	Asura	阿修罗	Sage	
2019	The Climbers	攀登者	Tibetan Buddhist monk	

=== TV series ===
Year	English title	Chinese title	Role	Notes
1995	Snow Tremor	雪震	Gonpo	
1997	Tibet Situation	西藏风云	Ngapoi Ngawang Jigme	
2000	Princess Wencheng	文成公主	Gongdun	
2001	Once Upon a Time in Lhasa	拉萨往事		
2002	When All Is Said And Done	尘埃落定	Wengbo Yixi	
2002	Flower of Happiness	八瓣格桑花	Luosang Danzeng	
2004	The Living Buddha	格达活佛	Living Buddha	
2005	Tea-Horse Road	茶马古道	Gongbu Galun	
2006		密电风云	a businessman	
2008	Snow Territory Day Road	雪域天路	Zhaxi	
2009	Jinfeng Bloom	金凤花开	Suolang Daji	
2011	The Mu Saga	木府风云	Mu Wang	
2011	Shangri-La	香格里拉	Lecang Sangji	
2013	A Hero	一代枭雄	Wang Sanchun	
2013	The Untold Story of Tibet	西藏秘密	Renqin Galun	
2019	Novoland: Eagle Flag	九州缥缈录	Mengle Huo'er	

== Film and TV Awards ==
Year	Nominated work	Award	Result	Notes
1995	Snow Tremor	Flying Apsaras Award for Outstanding Supporting Actor	Won	
1997	Red River Valley	Golden Rooster Award for Best Supporting Actor	Nominated	
2002	Flower of Happiness	Courser Award for Best Actor	Won	
2004	Kekexili: Mountain Patrol	41st Golden Horse Award for Best Leading Actor	Nominated	
2005	Kekexili: Mountain Patrol	25th Golden Rooster Award for Best Actor	Nominated	
2005	Kekexili: Mountain Patrol	Chinese Film Media Award for Best Actor	Nominated	
2014	No Man's Land	Chinese Film Media Award for Best Supporting Actor	Nominated	
