= Jin Na =

Jin Na is the name of:

- Jin Na (synchronized swimmer) (born 1976), Chinese synchronized swimmer
- Jin Na (screenwriter) (born c. 1976), Chinese screenwriter
