= 11th Beijing College Student Film Festival =

2004 film festival

The 11th Beijing College Student Film Festival (simplified Chinese: 第十一届北京大学生电影节; traditional Chinese: 第十一屆北京大學生電影節) was an event held by the Beijing Normal University and Beijing Municipal Bureau of Radio, Film and Television in 2004 in Beijing's Millennium Monument Hall, Beijing, China.

== Awards ==
- Best Film Award: Nuan
- Best Director Award: Zheng Dongtian for My Bitter Sweet Taiwan
- Best Actor Award: Fan Wei for The Parking Attendant In July
- Best Actress Award: Yu Nan for Jingzhe
- Best Visual Effects Award: Warriors of Heaven and Earth
- Best First Film Award: The Winter Solstice
- Favorite Actor Award: Jiang Wen for Warriors of Heaven and Earth, Chen Kun for Baober In Love
- Favorite Actress Award: Zhao Wei for Warriors of Heaven and Earth and Jade Goddess of Mercy
- Favorite Director: Feng Xiaogang for Cell Phone
- Artistic Exploration Award: Baober In Love
- Grand Prix Award: Cell Phone
- Committee Special Award: Mao Zedong: A Charismatic Leader, Profoundly Affecting, The Days Touched By Love
- Best Child Actor Award: Huang Doudou
