= Mountain patrol =

Mountain patrol may refer to:

- Kekexili: Mountain Patrol, a 2004 Chinese film
- Ski patrol, an organization that provides first aid and rescue services to skiers and participants of other snow sports
