= Ding Jiali =

Chinese actress

- 丁嘉丽
- Born: December 16, 1959 (age 66); Jiamusi, Heilongjiang, China
- Education: Shanghai Theatre Academy
- Occupation: Actress
- Years active: 1986-present
- Agents: National Theatre Company of China Chinese Dramatists Association; China Film Association
- Spouses: Wu Guangchuan (m. 1986–1987) A professor (m. 1990–1991)
- Children: 2

Chinese name
- Traditional Chinese: 丁嘉麗
- Simplified Chinese: 丁嘉丽
Transcriptions
Standard Mandarin
- Hanyu Pinyin: Dīng Jiālì

Ding Jiali (Chinese: 丁嘉丽; born 16 December 1959) is a Chinese actress.

Her career accolades include two Plum Blossom Prizes and Golden Rooster Awards, a Hundred Flowers Award, Flying Apsaras Award, Huabiao Award, Golden Phoenix Award, Chinese Film Media Award and Splendor Award.

== Life ==
=== Early life ===
Ding was born in 1959 in Jiamusi, Heilongjiang, she graduated from Shanghai Theatre Academy, majoring in acting. After graduating she was assigned to the National Theatre Company of China, where she met her first boyfriend.

=== Acting career ===
Ding had her first experience in front of the camera in 1986, and she was chosen to act as "Xiaobaixie" in Wang Junzheng's film A Woman In the Mountains, for which she won the "Best Supporting Actress" award at the 7th Golden Rooster Awards. At the same year, she won the 3rd Plum Blossom Prize.

In 1992, Ding won the "Best Supporting Actress" at the 12th Golden Rooster Awards for her performance in Spring Festival.

In 1993, Ding played the role of Han Liting in Xia Gang's film No More Applause, for which she received "Outstanding Actress" award and "Best Supporting Actress" award at the 2nd Beijing College Student Film Festival and 17th Hundred Flowers Awards respectively.

In 1999, Ding won the Golden Phoenix Award for her performance in The Red Card, and won the "Outstanding Actress" award at the 19th Flying Apsaras Awards for her performance in Love Unspoken. One year later, Ding won the Splendor Award and the 17th Plum Blossom Prize.

In 2001, Ding acted in Lu Xuechang's film Cala, My Dog! as Yu Lan, alongside Ge You and Ha Yu; she was nominated for "Best Actress" award at the 26th Hundred Flowers Awards and the 4th Chinese Film Media Awards.

In 2006, Ding participated in The Lane Premier, a film directed by Li Qimin, which garnered her an "Outstanding Actress" award at the 12th Huabiao Awards and received nomination at the 8th Changchun Film Festival.

== Personal life ==
Ding was married twice. Her first husband was Wu Guangchuan (吴广川). In 1986, when she was pregnant she heard her husband had an affair. Their daughter Hu Duoduo (胡朵朵) was born in 1987, and in the same year, they divorced.

She remarried in 1990 and her second husband is a professor. Their son Guoguo (果果) was born in 1991, but the couple divorced in the same year.

== Works ==
=== Film ===
Year	English Title	Chinese Title	Role	Notes
1986	A Woman In the Mountains	《山林中头的一个女人》	Xiaobaixie	
1991	Woman	《女人》	guest	
1991	The Spring Festival	《过年》	guest	
1993	Country Teachers	《凤凰琴》	Deng's wife	
1993		《孝子贤孙伺候着》	Sister	
1993	No More Applause	《无人喝彩》	Han Liting	
1994		《头发乱了》	Zheng Weiping	
1997	Colors of the Blind	黑眼睛	sister-in-law	
1998	The Special Operating Room	《特别手术室》	Yuanyuan	
1998		《打左灯向右转》	guest	
1998		《没事偷着乐》	Zhang Ermin	
1994	Able Man: Yu Si	《能人于四》	guest	
2000		《哑巴女人哑巴弹》	Zao Zhi	
2001	Cala, My Dog!	《卡拉是条狗》	Yu Lan	
2001	Divorce	《离婚》	Journalist	
2003	The Law of Romance	《警察有约》	Da Shun	
2005		《心急吃不了热豆腐》	guest	
2005	Son, Daughter-in-law, and Mother	《儿子媳妇和老娘》	Lawyer	
2006	The Lane Premier	《小巷总理》	Tan Zhuqing	
2008	The Marriage of Village	《乡村婚礼》	Mother	
2010		《初三初四看月亮》		
2010	Chongqing Blues	《日照重庆》	Li Yuying	
2014	Coming Home	《归来》		
2014	The Golden Era	《黄金时代》		
2018	Hidden Man	《邪不压正》	Li Tianran	
2018	Ash Is Purest White	《江湖儿女》	boat passenger	
2019	Push and Shove	《狗眼看人心》		
2019	The Bravest	《烈火英雄》	elderly lady	
2021	A Hustle Bustle New Year	《没有过不去的年》	Meng Yaomu	
2021	Hi, Mom	《你好，李焕英》	Bao Yumei	

=== Television ===
Year	English Title	Chinese Title	Role	Notes
1994		《飞来横福》	Ma Di	
1994	Ground Covered With Chicken Feather	《一地鸡毛》	Chen Baolian	
1995	Autumn in Beijing	《北京深秋的故事》	guest	
1998	Rickshaw Boy	《骆驼祥子》	Hu'niu	
1998	The Days We've Been Through	《一起走过的日子》	Lin Rubing	
1999	The Divorced Man	《男人离婚》	guest	
1999	Expect Emotions	《渴望激情》	Wu Man	
2000		《走戈壁的女人》	guest	
2002	Black Hole	《黑洞》	Wang Limin	
2003	The Legend of Knight-errant	《仙剑奇缘》	Meng's mother	
2003	No.4 Women's Prison	《四号女监》	Hu Lili	
2004		《花自飘零》	Shen Jing	
2004	Chinese Story	《中国故事》	Li Qin	
2005	Love Is In Part	《爱在离别时》	Liang Zhenhua	
2006	Nice Living	《活着真好》	Jian Jie	
2006	Youth is a Parabolic	《青春抛物线》	Teacher Hu	
2006	Chashu Mountain	《插树岭》	Yang Yeqing	
2006	Venturing to Northeast China	《闯关东》	guest	
2006	The Traffic Police	《交通警察》	Ma's wife	
2007	All The Brothers	《天下兄弟》	Wang Guilan	
2007	The Story of Theatre	《剧场逸事》	Zhao Meilan	
2007	Hukou	《户口》	guest	
2007		《男人立正》	guest	
2008	Special Love	《特别的爱》	Yang Jinhuan	
2008		《瑞雪丰年》	Chen Lihua	
2009	Outlander	《外乡人》	Daxu	
2010	We Are Family	《咱是一家人》	Meng Ting	
2011	Naked Marriage	《裸婚》	guest	
2011	Down To Earth Marriage	《裸婚时代》	Wu Hongxia	
2011	My Half-Brother	《异母兄弟》	guest	
2011	Lifetime Loving You	《一生只爱你》	Shu Fen	
2011	The Ordinary Days	《平凡的岁月》	guest	
2011		《风和日丽》	Xia Guihua	
2011	The Struggling Youth	《蚁族的奋斗》	Zhao Meifeng	
2012	30 Years Old	《而立之年》	Zheng Xiulan	
2013	Matched For Marriage	《门第》	Tang Lihua	

== Awards ==
Year	Work	Award	Result	Notes
1986		3rd Plum Blossom Prize	Won	
1987	A Woman In the Mountains	7th Goldden Rooster Award for Best Supporting Actress	Won	
1992	Spring Festival	12th Golden Rooster Award for Best Supporting Actress	Won	
1994	No More Applause	2nd Beijing College Student Film Festival - Outstanding Actress	Won	
1994	No More Applause	17th Hundred Flowers Award for Best Supporting Actress	Won	
1999	The Red Card	6th Golden Phoenix Award	Won	
1999	Love Unspoken	19th Flying Apsaras Award for Outstanding Actress	Won	
2000		Splendor Award	Won	
2000		17th Plum Blossom Prize	Won	
2003	Cala, My Dog!	26th Hundred Flowers Award for Best Actress	Nominated	
	Cala, My Dog!	4th Chinese Film Media Award for Best Actress	Nominated	
2007	The Lane Premier	12th Huabiao Award for Outstanding Actress	Won	
2008	The Lane Premier	8th Changchun Film Festival - Best Actress	Nominated	
2015	The Golden Era	30th Golden Rooster Award for Best Supporting Actress	Nominated	
