= Sonam Dargye =

Jesang Sonam Dargye བསོད་ནམས་དར་རྒྱས
- Born: 1954; Suojia Township, Zhiduo County, Yushu Prefecture, Qinghai Province, People's Republic of China
- Died: January 18, 1994 (aged 39–40); Hoh Xil Nature Reserve, Qinghai, People's Republic of China
- Known for: Pioneer of environmental protection in the Hoh Xil region
- Political party: Chinese Communist Party

Jesang Sonam Dargye (Tibetan: བསོད་ནམས་དར་རྒྱས, Wylie: Bsod nams dar rgyas; Chinese: 杰桑·索南达杰; pinyin: Jié sāng·Suǒ nán dá jié, 1954 – 18 January 1994), a native of Suojia Township, Zhiduo County, Yushu Prefecture, Qinghai Province, was an ethnic Tibetan, a member of the Chinese Communist Party, and a 1974 graduate of the Qinghai Nationalities Institute. He previously served as the Party Secretary of Suojia Township and Deputy Party Secretary of Zhiduo County. In 1992, he promoted the establishment of the Western Working Committee of the Zhiduo County Party Committee (referred to as the "Western Working Committee") and served as its secretary, combatting illegal gold mining and poaching endangered Tibetan antelope (chiru) in the Hoh Xil no-man's land to protect national resources. On January 8, 1994, Sonam Dargye led the Western Working Committee on their twelfth patrol into the Hoh Xil no-man's land. Ten days later, he was shot and killed while escorting armed poachers who had been hunting Tibetan antelopes. In November 1996, the National Environmental Protection Agency and the Ministry of Forestry jointly awarded him the title of "Environmental Defender." On the morning of December 18, 2018, at the conference celebrating the 40th anniversary of China's reform and opening up, 100 individuals, including Jesang Sonam Dargye, the "pioneer of ecological and environmental protection in Hoh Xil and Sanjiangyuan," were awarded the title of "Reform Pioneer" by the Central Committee of the CCP.

In August 1997, civilian environmentalists funded the construction of the Sonam Dargye Martyr Monument. The monument stands by the Qinghai-Tibet Highway at the Kunlun Mountain Pass in the Hoh Xil Nature Reserve, at an altitude of 4,700 meters. The monument is 5.8 meters high, with a portrait of Sonam Dargye inlaid on the front and his biographical deeds inscribed in both Tibetan and Chinese on the back. Later, due to changes in the foundation's permafrost layer and the impact of the 2010 Yushu earthquake, the monument tilted southward by about 25 degrees and sank by about 20 centimeters. The marble veneers on the guardrails peeled off in multiple places, and a corner of the stone table in front of the monument was smashed. In 2013, it was jointly funded and rebuilt by Zhiduo County of the Qinghai Yushu Tibetan Autonomous Prefecture and the Hoh Xil National Nature Reserve Management Bureau, and was inaugurated in August of the same year.

== Biography ==
=== Career ===
In 1974, after graduating from the Qinghai Nationalities Institute, Jesang Sonam Dargye gave up job opportunities at the National Translation Bureau and the Qinghai Nationalities Publishing House to return to his hometown of Zhiduo County, where he worked as a teacher at the county nationalities middle school. At the time, the school lacked sufficient teaching staff, so he taught Tibetan for all three junior high grades, physical education for the entire school, and served as the homeroom teacher for the eighth grade, frequently staying up late to prepare lessons and grade homework. Later, Jesang Sonam Dargye served as the deputy director of the Zhiduo County Education and Culture Bureau, presiding over the county's educational work. In 1987, Sonam Dargye was appointed Party Secretary of Suojia Township, Zhiduo County. In 1991, through his active efforts, the construction of a road from Suojia Township to the county seat was included as a work-for-relief project. Nearly 100 kilometers of the planned 265-kilometer road was completed, achieving seasonal traffic flow. The opening of this road ended Suojia Township's long history of isolation from the outside world.

Administratively, the main body of Hoh Xil in Qinghai is located in the western part of Zhiduo County, with a small section located in the northern part of Tanggula Town in Golmud. However, at the time, Zhiduo County had no direct road connecting to Hoh Xil, and one had to detour through Qumalai County to the north to reach it. From the discovery of the Malan Mountain gold mine in Hoh Xil in 1984 up until 1992, 50,000 to 60,000 people entered Hoh Xil each year to pan for gold. Yet, the gold mining permits issued to these miners came from Golmud, which was closest to Hoh Xil, and Qumalai County, which was slightly further away. Often, the same patch of gold mine would be issued permits by both local governments to different miners. From the mid-to-late 1980s through the 1990s, Hoh Xil was plagued by this chaotic, profit-sharing style of illegal gold mining. Moreover, most mining sites used primitive manual methods and sluice boxes, causing massive resource waste and severe destruction of the natural environment. In 1991, Sonam Dargye submitted the "Report on the Management and Development of Hoh Xil" to the Zhiduo County Government. Following the suggestions in the report, Zhiduo County petitioned the Yushu Prefecture People's Government to establish an ecological and environmental protection agency for Hoh Xil. In July 1992, after repeated proposals by Sonam Dargye to the Zhiduo County Party Committee, the committee allocated 50,000 yuan in startup funds to establish the Western Working Committee of the Zhiduo County Party Committee (WWC), with Sonam Dargye, then the Deputy Party Secretary of the county, serving as its secretary. Its main task was to crack down on illegal gold mining in the Hoh Xil no-man's land and protect mineral resources, while also attempting to generate economic benefits for Zhiduo County by developing gold, silver, and salt resources. Therefore, the WWC concurrently carried the title of "Hoh Xil Economic Development Corporation." At the time, Golmud and Qumalai County had issued a large number of mining permits; Qumalai County had even established its own Western Working Committee specifically to charge fees and issue permits for miners. Sonam Dargye informed them that the territory belonged to Zhiduo County and demanded they leave within a specified time limit, but this had little effect. Sensing that Golmud and Qumalai County would be reluctant to hand over resource control to Zhiduo County, Sonam Dargye submitted a report to the Qinghai Provincial Forestry Department in 1993, hoping to establish a Hoh Xil Nature Reserve.

In the early 1990s, the international market saw a skyrocketing demand for Shahtoosh fabrics produced in Indian-controlled Kashmir, which used Tibetan antelope underfleece as its sole raw material. As a result, the profits from illegal poaching of Tibetan antelopes began to approach or even exceed those of gold mining. Many gold miners turned into poachers. They drove jeeps to track down Tibetan antelopes, surrounding them at night and using bright vehicle headlights to blind the animals, preventing them from escaping. Large numbers of Tibetan antelopes were massacred. Sonam Dargye once lamented, "This is not a no-man's land, but a lawless land." Consequently, the focus of the Western Working Committee gradually shifted from combatting illegal mining to protecting Hoh Xil's wildlife and natural environment. According to his secretary Hashi Tashi Dorje, when they first entered Hoh Xil, Sonam Dargye carried the book *Industrial Mineral Development*; later, the book in his pocket changed to the *List of Endangered Species*. Driven by Sonam Dargye, the Hoh Xil Forestry Police Station and the "Wildlife Protection Office" were quickly established, followed by the "Alpine Grassland Protection Office." To combat increasingly rampant illegal poaching, Sonam Dargye relied on the WWC to form China's first armed anti-poaching team. They successfully apprehended 8 illegal armed poaching gangs, confiscated 25 firearms of various types, over 10,000 rounds of ammunition, 12 vehicles, 1,416 Tibetan antelope pelts, and more than 200 corsac fox pelts. They also confiscated 40,000 yuan in illegal mining fees, playing a crucial role in curbing environmental destruction and protecting the ecology of Hoh Xil.

=== Death and burial ===
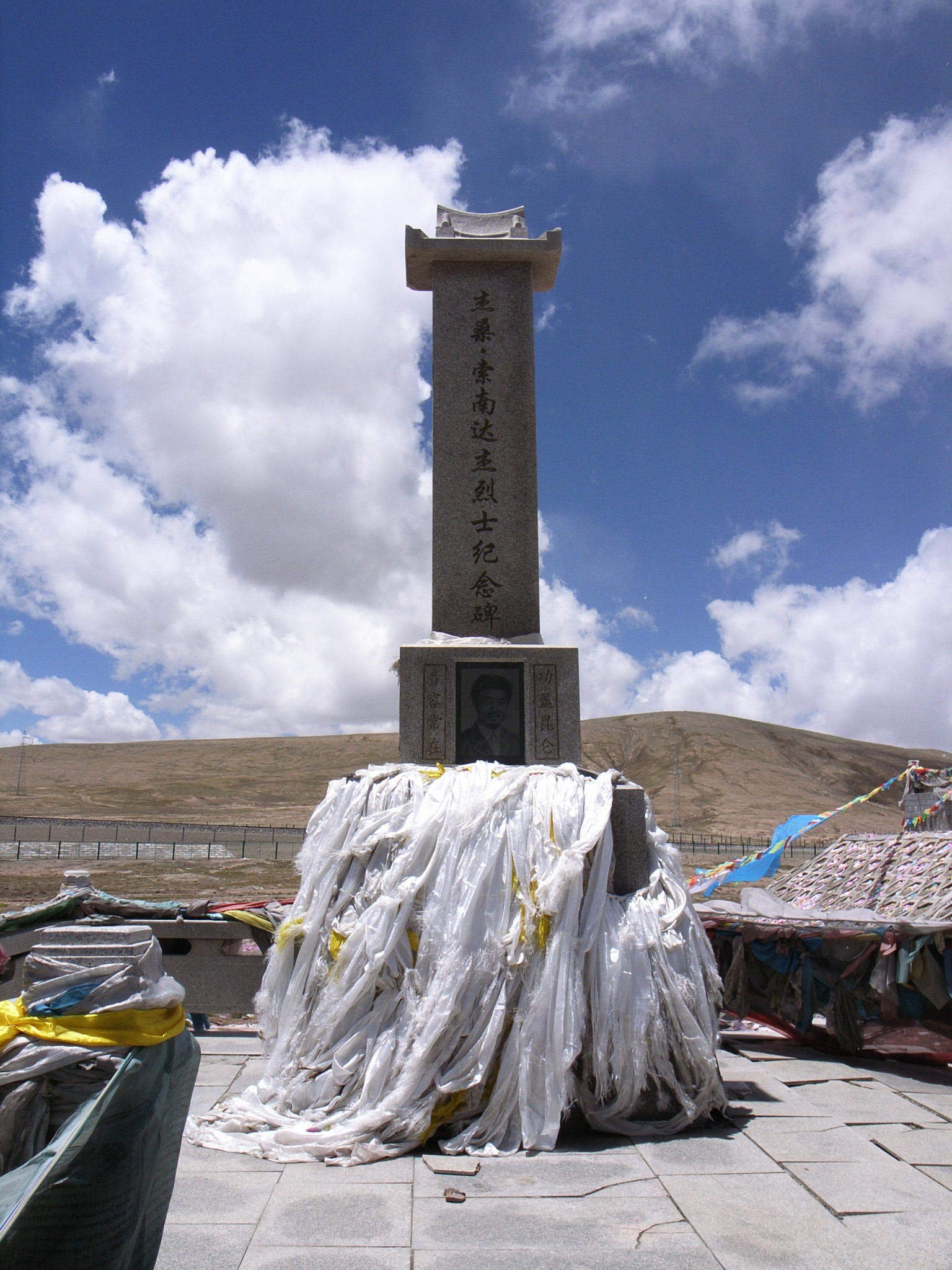
The Sonam Dargye Martyr Monument located at the Kunlun Mountain Pass

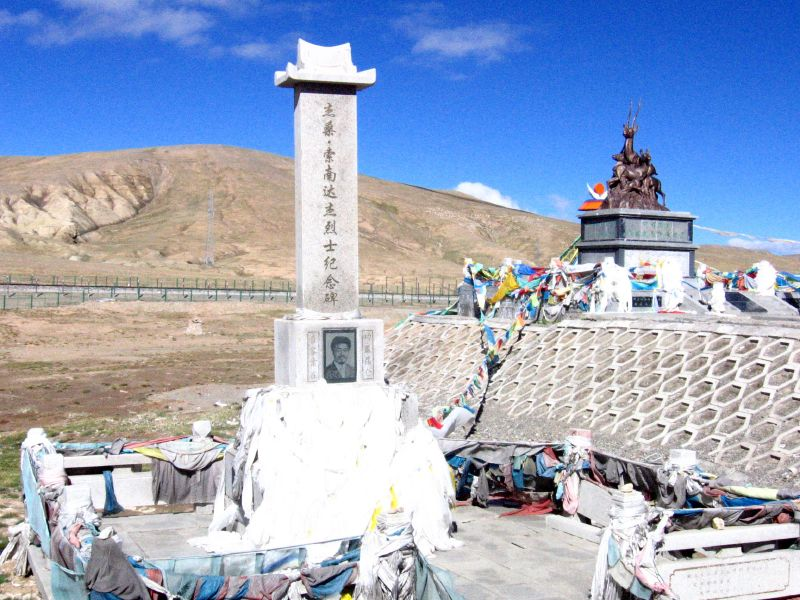
The Martyr Monument and the original Hoh Xil Nature Reserve monument in the distance

On January 8, 1994, Sonam Dargye departed from Golmud, entering the Hoh Xil no-man's land for the twelfth time. From January 9 to 13, he, alongside his secretary Hashi Tashi Dorje, two WWC staff members Jin Yanzu and Cai Zhaxi, guide Han Weilin, and two drivers, uncovered three cases of illegal fox poaching and investigated two illegal gold mining operations. They confiscated 233 corsac fox pelts, over 20 fox pelts, 3 small-caliber rifles, 1 modified semi-automatic rifle, 1 musket, 3,600 rounds of ammunition, and poison used to kill wildlife. They also impounded a Dongfeng truck and detained its driver. On January 16, near Quanshuihe at the junction of Qinghai, Tibet, and Xinjiang, Sonam Dargye's team captured two groups totaling 20 poachers. These were an 8-person gang from Hualong, Qinghai, led by Wang Yibulahaimai and Han Yiziri, and a 12-person gang from Hualong led by Han Zhongming, Ma Zhongxiao, and Ma Qingyuan. The team seized 5 vehicles and two massive truckloads containing over 1,800 Tibetan antelope pelts. The 12-person gang had just spent nine days slaughtering more than 1,000 Tibetan antelopes near Jingyu Lake in the Altun Shan National Nature Reserve in Xinjiang (outside of Hoh Xil's boundaries). That night, two of the poachers suffered from high-altitude pulmonary edema and gunshot wounds. Sonam Dargye, whose chronic gastroenteritis had flared up, ordered Hashi Tashi Dorje and Cai Zhaxi to drive the two men overnight to Golmud for medical treatment. Before they left, he exchanged his lighter Type 79 pistol for Hashi Tashi Dorje's Type 54 pistol, taking charge of escorting the remaining 18 poachers with the rest of the team.

On January 18, Sonam Dargye and his men had gone without food for several days. At around 4:00 PM, while resting on the southern shore of Sun Lake, Han Zhongming, Ma Zhongxiao, and Ma Qingyuan, who had been secretly plotting an escape, took advantage of a tire blowout on the truck Sonam Dargye was riding in. They launched an attack and seized control of all the confiscated vehicles. Ma Chenghu, Li Haiqing, and several others fled in a vehicle, while Ma Shenghua and Wang Yibu seized the WWC's pistols and submachine guns. After Sonam Dargye rushed to the scene, Ma Zhongxiao, Han Suomangnai, Ma Xueping, and Ma Heime attempted to tie him up. In the ensuing struggle, Sonam Dargye shot and killed Ma Zhongxiao and wounded Han Suomangnai. Under Han Zhongming's command, the poachers opened fire on him, and then Han Zhongming, Ma Shenghua, Wang Yibulahaimai, and others fled in the stolen vehicles. When Jin Yanzu returned to the scene the next day, Sonam Dargye had already frozen to death after being shot. A subsequent forensic autopsy revealed that a gunshot wound had completely penetrated his abdomen, causing death by hemorrhagic shock. Jin Yanzu and the other survivors attempted to transport Sonam Dargye's body out of the desert, but their vehicle became stuck in a mud river and failed. Due to the lack of communication, the Zhiduo County Public Security Bureau did not receive the report until the 22nd, and police rescue personnel arrived on the 25th.

Due to poor transportation conditions, Sonam Dargye's body was not brought back to Zhiduo County until February 9. The entire county came out to welcome his remains, with every household lighting butter lamps and chanting sutras for him. It was the Lunar New Year, but the entire county abstained from celebrating the festival. Sonam Dargye's funeral was held on February 12. According to Tibetan customs, the dead are typically given a sky burial or water burial, but Sonam Dargye was given a cremation, a special treatment normally reserved for Living Buddhas. In September 1998, Sonam Dargye's sister Pema, his brother-in-law Zhaba Duojie, and the anti-poaching members of the Western Working Committee followed his last wishes and scattered his ashes in the hinterlands of Hoh Xil where he once worked, including Zhuonai Lake, Sun Lake, and Buka Daban Peak.

=== Case investigation ===
After Sonam Dargye was shot and killed, the Yushu Prefecture police quickly formed the "1.18" task force to hunt down the killers. The principal offender, Ma Zhongxiao, had been killed on the spot by Sonam Dargye. Another principal offender, Han Zhongming, was captured by the task force on a highway near Qingshashan when he illegally entered Hoh Xil again in early 1995 to mine for gold; he was sentenced to death by the court later that year and executed immediately. Accomplice Ma Shenghua was captured by police in Guide County, Qinghai Province, eight months after the incident; the following year, he was sentenced to 20 years in prison by the Intermediate People's Court of Yushu Tibetan Autonomous Prefecture. He was released after serving 13 years and opened a ramen restaurant in Suzhou. Another accomplice, Wang Yibulahaimai, was sentenced to 18 years in prison. On April 29, 2008, Han Chengying, another suspect, was escorted by Yushu police from Wuxi to Xining. Between November 20 and December 1, 2011, six suspects involved in the shooting—Han Yahayang, Han Sumangnai, Ma Chenghu, Ma Xueping, Li Haiqing, and Peng Haiyun—successively surrendered to the Hualong County Public Security Bureau after multiple persuasions by public security organs. Another fugitive, Han Yiziri, died of illness while on the run. As of the end of 2011, five suspects were still at large. In September 2020, another fugitive was caught.

== Family ==
Sonam Dargye's wife, Duosha Cairen, became a delegate to the Yushu Prefecture People's Congress and the Party Congress after her husband's death. Both of his sons work for the Zhiduo County Forest Public Security Bureau. During an interview, his second son, Sonam Danzheng, stated that he "will do the same kind of work his father did."

Sonam Dargye's brother-in-law, Qika Zhaba Duojie, served as the director of the Zhiduo County Public Security Bureau after being demobilized from the army, and later served as a member of the Yushu Prefecture People's Congress Standing Committee and deputy director of its legal committee. Deeply moved by Sonam Dargye's heroic deeds after his murder, Zhaba Duojie voluntarily resigned in May 1995 to re-establish the Western Working Committee. In October of the same year, he founded a full-time armed anti-poaching team in a tent at the Eighth Work Area on the Qinghai-Tibet Highway, naming it the Wild Yak Patrol. The team's members were mostly demobilized soldiers and unemployed youths recruited from society, and even included some reformed former poachers. However, they lacked formal equipment, with some of their weapons confiscated from criminals. Over the five years from its inception to its disbandment, the Wild Yak Patrol patrolled the mountains over a hundred times, arrested 92 Tibetan antelope poaching gangs, and confiscated over 8,000 Tibetan antelope pelts, accounting for almost half of all anti-poaching achievements in Qinghai, Tibet, and Xinjiang combined. Nevertheless, the Wild Yak Patrol was also plagued by issues, such as irregular law enforcement practices, unauthorized release of captured poachers, privately selling confiscated pelts (nearly 7,000 pelts went missing) to split the proceeds, and indiscriminately issuing permits to gold miners and brine shrimp fishers. They were consequently reported by the leadership of the Hoh Xil Nature Reserve Management Office. Eight former members of the "Wild Yak Patrol" were even arrested by the Golmud City Procuratorate in 2001 on suspicion of embezzlement, a situation that reflected the patrol's chronic lack of stable financial support. Because their funding came entirely from fines, a decrease in poaching actually meant fewer funds, causing them to frequently miss payroll and lack money for mountain patrols. During a speaking tour at multiple universities in Beijing in the fall of 1998, Zhaba Duojie expressed that because the Western Working Committee was "currently in debt for a total of 860,000 yuan internally and externally," he was forced to sell confiscated pelts to raise funds, which caused him "deep inner pain." On the evening of November 8, 1998, the day after Zhaba Duojie returned home to Yushu from his business trip in Beijing, he died after being shot in the head at close range by a Type 77 pistol bullet. Police investigations ruled his death a suicide, though his true cause of death remains disputed. The deeds of Zhaba Duojie and the Wild Yak Patrol were documented in the 2002 documentary *Balance* (*Pingheng*), directed by Peng Hui. At the end of 2000, the Western Working Committee and the Wild Yak Patrol were disbanded; personnel at or above the deputy section chief level returned to their original units, and the rest were merged into the Hoh Xil National Nature Reserve Management Bureau.

Zhaba Duojie's two sons currently work at the Hoh Xil Nature Reserve Management Bureau, with one son, Qiupei Zhaxi, serving as the head of the Zhuonai Lake protection station.

== Legacy ==
The death of Sonam Dargye shocked all sectors of society and public opinion nationwide, awakening Chinese society to the survival plight of the Tibetan antelope. In 1995, the Chinese government approved the establishment of the provincial "Hoh Xil Nature Reserve" in Qinghai Province, which was upgraded to the "Qinghai Hoh Xil National Nature Reserve" in 1997. In 2015, Hoh Xil was placed on China's tentative list for World Heritage status. On July 7, 2017, it passed the final review at the 41st session of the UNESCO World Heritage Committee and was inscribed on the World Heritage List, becoming China's 51st World Heritage Site. The nominated area for the Hoh Xil World Heritage Site is located within Zhiduo County and Qumalai County in the Yushu Tibetan Autonomous Prefecture. The nominated area covers approximately 3.7 million hectares, with a buffer zone of 2.3 million hectares, totaling about 6 million hectares. The geographical area covers the entirety of the Hoh Xil National Nature Reserve and a portion of the Suojia-Qumahe protection zoning of the Sanjiangyuan National Nature Reserve.

In August 1994, Yang Xin, who was exploring the source of the Yangtze River, was deeply inspired by Sonam Dargye and began participating in environmental activities. In 1995, he launched the "Protect the Yangtze River Source, Love Our Great Nature" campaign and visited the Hoh Xil region multiple times for investigations. In 1997, he established an anti-poaching frontline post in Hoh Xil—the Sonam Dargye Natural Protection Station, which was also the first natural protection station within the reserve. He additionally contacted Qika Zhaba Duojie to jointly discuss the conservation of Tibetan antelopes and sought international assistance. By the end of 2011, over 300 volunteers from all over the country had cumulatively served at the Sonam Dargye Natural Protection Station. One volunteer even lost his life 10 kilometers away from the station at the end of 2002. The Sonam Dargye Natural Protection Station is the earliest and most famous protection station established in the Hoh Xil region, with its main tasks being receiving tourists and rescuing Tibetan antelopes. In 2003, the Sonam Dargye Protection Station was handed over from the volunteers to the Qinghai Hoh Xil National Nature Reserve Management Bureau.

== In popular culture ==
- In 1995, Sonam Dargye's assistant Tashi Dorje (Zhaduo) collaborated with Chinese director Guo Bichuan to film a biographical film about Sonam Dargye, Jesang Sonam Dargye. Guo Bichuan played Sonam Dargye, and Zhaduo played himself. The widely circulated images on the internet of Sonam Dargye lying frozen in the snow are mostly taken from this film.
- In 2004, Chinese director Fu Jingsheng directed the 32-episode television series Black Gun (Tiancang Yemang), which used the ecological protection of Hoh Xil as its main storyline. It depicted the anti-illegal mining and anti-poaching deeds of a group of heroic figures based on Sonam Dargye and Zhaba Duojie.
- In 2005, Chinese director Lu Chuan directed the film Kekexili: Mountain Patrol, which portrayed the Chinese authorities' efforts to protect the Tibetan antelope from 1993 to 1995. The main character, Ritai, was created based on Sonam Dargye.
- In the Vanke Pavilion at the 2010 Shanghai World Expo, a film about environmental protection played in the "Respect · Possibility" hall included a segment depicting Sonam Dargye's deeds in defending nature in Hoh Xil.
- In the television series Tree of Life (premiered in 2026), the character Duojie, played by Hu Ge, is based on Sonam Dargye.

== See also ==
- Hoh Xil
- Tibetan antelope
