= Lunar Eclipse (film) =

- Film poster
- Traditional Chinese: 月蝕
- Simplified Chinese: 月蚀
- Hanyu Pinyin: Yùe shí
- Directed by: Wang Quan'an
- Written by: Wang Quan'an
- Produced by: Han Sanping
- Starring: Yu Nan; Wu Chao; Hu Xiaoguang
- Cinematography: Gao Fei
- Edited by: Dayyan Eng
- Music by: Zhang Yang
- Production company: Beijing Film Studio
- Release date: October 22, 1999 (China)
- Running time: 95 minutes
- Country: China
- Language: Mandarin

Lunar Eclipse is a 1999 Chinese film and the directorial debut from Sixth Generation director Wang Quan'an. It is also the feature film debut of Wang's most frequent collaborator/muse Yu Nan. Unlike his next two films, which focus on rural communities, Lunar Eclipse is an urban drama following the wife of a newlywed couple (Yu Nan) who becomes mesmerized by an amateur photographer (Wu Chao) who claims to have once been in love with a woman who looked just like her. The film was produced by the Beijing Film Studio.

With its themes of dual female identities, the film is often referenced in conjunction with Lou Ye's Suzhou River.

== Cast ==
- Yu Nan as Ya Nan, a young bride
- Hu Xiaoguang as Guohao, Ya Nan's husband is Ying Yan Xiang
- Wu Chao as Xiaobing, a minivan driver and amateur photographer

== Reception ==
=== Awards and nominations ===
- 2000 22nd Moscow International Film Festival - Lunar Eclipse was in competition for the festival's top prize, the Golden St. George, though it failed to win. It did, however, win the FIPRESCI Prize.
- 2001 Deauville Asian Film Festival - Lunar Eclipse won a prize for Best Actress for Yu Nan's performance.

== See also ==
- Suzhou River, Lou Ye's 2000 film that share similar themes
