= Apart Together =

2010 film

- Film poster
- Traditional Chinese: 團圓
- Simplified Chinese: 团圆
- Literal meaning: Reunion
- Hanyu Pinyin: Tuán yuán
- Directed by: Wang Quan'an
- Written by: Wang Quan'an; Jin Na
- Produced by: Du Daning; Ouwen; Ruan Yusheng; Wang Le; Wang Quan'an; Wang Zhanliang
- Starring: Lu Yan
- Cinematography: Lutz Reitemeier
- Edited by: Wu Yixiang
- Music by: Nina Peng
- Production company: Lightshades Film Productions
- Release date: 11 February 2010 (Berlinale)
- Running time: 97 minutes
- Country: China
- Language: Shanghainese

Apart Together (Chinese: 团圆) is a 2010 Chinese drama film directed by Wang Quan'an. It was nominated for the Golden Bear at the 60th Berlin International Film Festival and won the Best Screenplay award.

== Plot ==
A former Nationalist soldier (Feng Ling) who fled mainland China in 1949 returns home to his family years later. But his wife (Lu Yan) has a new common-law husband and he has never met his son before.

== Cast ==
- Lu Yan as Qiao Yu-e
- Xu Caigen as Qiao Yu-e's husband
- Mo Xiaotian
- Ling Feng as Liu Yangsheng

== Accolades ==
Date	Award	Category	Recipient(s) and nominee(s)	Result	Notes
2010	17th Beijing College Student Film Festival	Best Director	Wang Quan'an	Won	
2010	60th Berlin International Film Festival	Golden Bear	Apart Together	Nominated	
2010	60th Berlin International Film Festival	Silver Bear for Best Screenplay	Wang Quan'an and Jin Na	Won	
2010		Best Supporting Actor	Xu Caigen	Nominated	
2011	28th Golden Rooster Awards	Best Supporting Actor	Xu Caigen	Won	
2011	China Image Film Festival	Best Film	Apart Together	Won	
2011	China Image Film Festival	Best Actress	Lu Yan	Won	
2014	Beijing International Film Festival	Chinese Story	Apart Together	Nominated	
