= Lord of Shanghai (film) =

- Traditional Chinese: 上海王
- Simplified Chinese: 上海王
- Hanyu Pinyin: Shànghaǐ Wāng
- Directed by: Sherwood Hu
- Written by: Sherwood Hu; Pang Bei; Hong Ying
- Based on: Lord of Shanghai by Hong Ying
- Produced by: Sherwood Hu
- Starring: Hu Jun; Yu Nan; Rhydian Vaughan; Qin Hao
- Cinematography: Andrzej Sekuła
- Edited by: Chen Xiaohong; Cheung Ka-Fai
- Music by: Johnny Klimek
- Production companies: Shanghai Film Studio; Shanghai Hus Entertainment; Shanghai International Group
- Distributed by: Xiangshan Fenghai Media Technology Co., Ltd.
- Release dates: 19 June 2016 (Shanghai Festival); 17 February 2017 (China)
- Running time: 111 minutes
- Country: China
- Language: Mandarin

Lord of Shanghai (Chinese: 上海王) is a 2016 Chinese action film co-written, produced and directed by Sherwood Hu and stars Hu Jun, Yu Nan, Rhydian Vaughan, and Qin Hao. The film is an adaptation of Hong Ying's novel of the same name. It picks up the story of three generations of the Lord of Shanghai and their love story of the legendary woman Xiao Yuegui. The film was first released in China on 17 February 2017.

A sequel, Lord of Shanghai II, directed again by Wu and featuring most of the cast with the addition of Amber Kuo, was released on 22 August 2020.

== Plot ==
In the early 20th century. Xiao Yuegui (Yu Nan) is sold as a maid to a Shanghai brothel, where Madam Dai Yu (Bai Ling) doesn't like her because she has a no-count big foot with big breasts. But soon she becomes a lover of Chang Lixong (Hu Jun), who is the gang leader of Hong society. After meeting with Huang Peiyu (Qin Hao), a leader of the secret society and underground resistance movement Tongmenghui, Chang Lixong is assassinated during an escape by Huang Peiyu wife. Xiao Yuegui becomes helpless and then goes to the countryside, where she gives birth to a daughter.

Years later, Xiao Yuegui organizes a theatrical troupe named "Tanhuang Banzi", and she returns to Shanghai. Under the patronage of the second generation lord of Shanghai Huang Peiyu, she rose to prominence. After falling in love with Huang she learns that he was involved in the assassination of her husband Chang Lixiong. Xiao Yuegui persuades Yu Qiyang (Rhydian Vaughan), an attendant to both lords of Shanghai, to promote justice. After Huang's death, Yu Qiyang replaces him to become the third generation lord of Shanghai.

== Cast ==
- Hu Jun as Chang Lixiong (常力雄), gang leader, the first generation lord of Shanghai.
- Yu Nan as Xiao Yuegui (筱月桂), a native of Pudong District, Shanghai, lover of three generations of the Lord of Shanghai.
  - Vivien Li as young Xiao Yuegui
- Rhydian Vaughan as Yu Qiyang (余其扬), the third generation lord of Shanghai.
- Qin Hao as Huang Peiyu (黄佩玉), the second generation lord of Shanghai.
- Liu Peiqi as Song Shoubei (宋守备)
- Cao Kefan as Private adviser (师爷)
- Purba Rgyal as Childe Lu (卢少爷)
- Tobgyal as General Lu (卢将军)
- Johann Urb as Jensen
- Xu Dongdong as Lu Xianglan (陆香兰), a concubine of Huang Peiyu.
- Bai Ling as Dai Yu
- He Saifei

== Production ==
In 2003, Sherwood Hu bought the film rights to the 2003 novel Lord of Shanghai written by Hong Ying. Hu has said he had spent ten years developing the film.

== Music ==
| Year | English title | Chinese title | Singer | Notes |
|---|---|---|---|---|
| 9 February 2017 | Flowers Bloom in a Troubled World | 花开乱世 | Shang Wenjie | |

== Release ==
On June 20, 2016, the producers released a set of concept posters. On December 15, the producers released an official trailer.

On January 16, 2017, the producers held a release conference in Beijing, it was announced that the release date for Lord of Shanghai will be on February 24. On February 10, it was announced that the film has been advanced to February 17.

The film premiered at Shanghai International Film Festival on June 19, 2016, and opened in China on February 17, 2017.

The film received mainly negative reviews, although it won several awards at the 8th Macau International Movie Festival.

== Box office ==
The film grossed 13 million yuan in Chinese box office.

== Accolades ==
| Date | Award | Category | Recipient(s) and nominee(s) | Result | Notes |
|---|---|---|---|---|---|
| 2016 | 8th Macau International Movie Festival | Best Director | Sherwood Hu | Won | |
| 2016 | 8th Macau International Movie Festival | Best Picture | Lord of Shanghai | Nominated | |
| 2016 | 12th Chinese American Film Festival | Best Director | Sherwood Hu | Won | |
