= Bei Cun =

Chinese novelist

Kang Hong (康洪; born September 16, 1965), better known by his pen name Bei Cun (北村), is a Chinese avant-garde Christian novelist. He has been described as "the only openly Christian Chinese writer who enthusiastically incorporates religious themes into his fiction."

== Early years ==
Kang Hong was born in Changting County, Fujian. He experienced the Cultural Revolution as a child first exposed to human evil, a theme that will return in his novels. He studied at Xiamen University from 1981 to 1985. He was a brilliant student and after graduation was hired as editor of the journal Fujian Literature, where he started publishing under the pen name of Bei Cun.

He was immediately noticed as a writer critical of authority when he published, in the first issue of Fujian Literature he edited in 1986, the short story Black Horses (黑马群). When a storm hits, all horses in a group follow their leader, the Old Black Horse, not realizing that it is as clueless as they are about how to save the herd. In the end, it brings them to the edge of a cliff.

== Avant-garde author ==
Most Chinese critics divide Bei Cun's writing career in two separate stages, as an avant-garde author before the conversion to Christianity in 1992, and as a Christian novelist after that date. Leung Laifong wrote that the writer's "career falls into two parts, with 1992 as the demarcation line." This interpretation, however, was contested in 2018 by Chinese scholars Zhang Yunyan and Wang Huiping. They analyzed Bei Cun's pre-1992 writings and argued that, perhaps unbeknownst to the author himself, religious themes and questions were always implicitly present there.

Bei Cun was part of the generation of writers who, after the Cultural Revolution, experimented with new languages, including fastidious descriptions of objects and landscapes, and deliberate repetitions. Some critics even considered him "the only [real] avant-garde writer" of the 1980s.

Most of his early novels are detective stories starting with a homicide, but the plot and the denouement are not conventional. Discovering who the murderer was is less important than exploring the feelings of the characters and introducing powerful metaphors. In what was hailed as Bei Cun's best pre-1992 novel, Guozao zhe shuo (聒噪者说) ("Uproar" or "The Noisy"), published in 1991, a deaf-mute principal of a school regains the ability to speak when the words "God said, let there be light and there was light" are written by a noisy, pompous professor, who also writes, "I said, let there be God and there was God." The principal then dies in a fire started by an arsonist and the professor commits suicide. The real theme of the novel, it has been argued, is not murder, but the ambiguity and power of the language.

== Christian writer ==
In March 1992, Bei Cun experienced what he described as an instant conversion to Protestant Christianity through a mystical experience. After the conversion, he joined a house church in Beijing and did not publish anything for one year, although he was busy writing The Baptismal River (施洗的河), which was published in 1993. The novel depicts organized crime in Republican China through the ruthless fight between the bosses of two criminal families in Fujian, Liu Lang and Ma Da. Liu, whose career the novel follows, consolidates the power he inherited from his father by eliminating all his rivals, including members of his own family. Old and immensely rich, he realizes his life has no real meaning, converts to Protestantism, and is even willing to help his arch-enemy Ma. Critics noticed the book as a rare example of a Chinese novel focused on evil and conversion, which is described here in Christian terms very much different from the "re-education" offered by the Chinese jail system.

Bei Cun's subsequent novels puzzled some Christian readers because, unlike The Baptismal River, the religious theme was not at the center of the plot. The Lament of Loss (伤逝, 1993), The Love Story of Mazhuo (玛卓的爱情, 1994), and the novella Zhou Yu's Train (周渔的火车) are all about women who struggle to find the perfect love only to conclude it does not exist. In all three stories, one or more of the main characters either die tragically or commit suicide. If there is a Christian theme here, it is that women fail by pursuing a possessive romantic love, while only spiritual love would have saved them.

The novella was made into a 2002 movie with the same title, Zhou Yu's Train, directed by Sun Zhou and starring Gong Li and Tony Leung Ka-Fai. It tells the story of a widow, Zhou Yu, who lives in the loving memory of her husband, killed accidentally by electric shock in the rain. In the end, she discovers that her "perfect" husband in fact had a lover, who tells her that Zhou Yu's possessiveness and jealousy were responsible for his infidelity.

With the 2004 novel Fennu (愤怒, "Anger"), Bei Cun returned both to his early theme of murder and to the Christian theme of conversion. Li Bailing is a rich businessman known as a philanthropist but hides two dark secrets, an incestuous relation with his adopted daughter and the murder of the policeman who tortured his father to death. At the end of the novel, Li repents and confesses to God that his life has been dominated by anger rather than love.

The themes of crime and repentance are also at the center of Bei Cun's later Christian novels, I Have an Agreement with God (我和上帝有个约, 2006) and A Consolation Letter (安慰书, 2016). In these stories, Bei Cun's "faith-writing" situates his characters in a larger social context, and hope prevails upon fear even in tragic circumstances.
