= Blood (South Korean TV series) =

2015 South Korean television series

- Promotional poster
- Genre: Medical drama Vampire; Thriller; Romance
- Written by: Park Jae-beom
- Directed by: Ki Min-soo; Lee Jae-hoon
- Starring: Ahn Jae-hyun; Ji Jin-hee; Koo Hye-sun; Son Soo-hyun
- Opening theme: "Blood"
- Composer: Lee Pil-ho
- Country of origin: South Korea
- Original languages: Korean; English
- No. of seasons: 1
- No. of episodes: 20

Production
- Executive producers: Go Byung-chul; Shin In-soo; Kim Sung-geun
- Producers: Jo Woong; Yoon Jae-hyuk
- Cinematography: Byun Choon-ho; Moon Chang-soo
- Editor: Kim Mi-kyung
- Running time: 65 minutes
- Production company: IOK Media

Original release
- Network: KBS
- Release: February 16 – April 21, 2015

Blood (Korean: 블러드) is a 2015 South Korean television series starring Ahn Jae-hyun, Ji Jin-hee, Koo Hye-sun, and Son Soo-hyun. It aired on KBS2 from February 16 to April 21, 2015, on Mondays and Tuesdays at 22:00 for 20 episodes.

== Plot ==
Park Ji-sang (Ahn Jae-hyun) is a doctor specializing in hepato-pancreato-biliary surgery in the best cancer research hospital in the country. He is also a vampire. Despite seeming cold and unfeeling, Ji-sang masks his soft heart and inner pain and yearns for closeness with people. He believes very strongly in the sanctity of human life, and suppresses his thirst for blood to treat terminally ill patients and save lives. Among his colleagues is Yoo Ri-ta (Ku Hye-sun), a hotshot physician who entered medical school at the age of 17 and is also the niece of the chaebol group chairman who owns the hospital. Ri-ta is highly capable but snooty and arrogant, yet Ji-sang finds himself falling for her. He also gets drawn into a conflict between good and evil as he encounters Lee Jae-wook, a two-faced hospital director who gains everyone's trust with his gentle demeanor, but inwardly harbors a dangerous ambition for power and a talent for cruelty.

== Cast ==
=== Main ===
- Ahn Jae-hyun as Park Ji-sang/Jason Park
  - Baek Seung-hwan as young Ji-sang

A very handsome and talented hepato-pancreato-biliary surgeon and medical researcher in Taemin Hospital. Ji-sang is a vampire, being an infectee of the VBT-01 virus he inherited from his infected (vampire) parents. Though cold and indifferent on the outside, Ji-sang is soft and caring on the inside, bearing the pain of losing his parents who were killed by the evil infectee Jae-wook. He believes very strongly in the sanctity of human life, and suppresses his thirst for blood to treat terminally ill patients and save lives. He falls for fellow surgeon and childhood acquaintance Yoo Ri-ta.

- Ji Jin-hee as Lee Jae-wook

An evil vampire/VBT-01 infectee who harbors a dangerous ambition for power and a talent for cruelty. Along with Ji-sang's parents, he was a mentee and fellow researcher of Dr. Jung Han-su, the discoverer of the VBT-01 virus. Seeing the virus' potential in human enhancement, he plans to extend the research, to which Dr. Jung and the other mentees strongly disagree for ethical considerations. Blinded by greed, he infects himself with the virus, kills Dr. Jung, and sends his men to hunt Ji-sang's parents. He becomes the director of Taemin Hospital, gaining everyone's trust with his gentle demeanor and using the hospital to continue his research on VBT-01.

- Koo Hye-sun as Yoo Ri-ta/Yoo Chae-eun
  - Jung Chan-bi as young Chae-eun

A highly capable but arrogant surgeon of Taemin Hospital. Born as Yoo Chae-eun, she lost her parents in a trip to Jeju. There, she is saved by Ji-sang from a pack of wolves. Suffering the pain of her parents' deaths, she adopts her current name Ri-ta. She had entered medical school at the age of 17 and is also the niece of the chaebol group chairman who owns the hospital. She meets Ji-sang at Taemin Hospital, though she does not recognize him and is annoyed by his presence.

- Son Soo-hyun as Min Ga-yeon

A first-year resident at Taemin Hospital and Ji-sang's subordinate. She secretly works under Jae-wook, who had saved her from dying by turning her into a vampire and became her father figure.

=== Supporting ===
Taemin Hospital people

- Kim Kap-soo as Yoo Seok-joo

Ri-ta's chaebol uncle and chairman of Taemin Hospital

- Jin Kyung as Choi Kyung-in

Vice-chairperson of Taemin Hospital

- Jung Hye-sung as Choi Soo-eun

Ri-ta's best friend and mentee of Jung Ji-tae

- Kim Yu-seok as Jung Ji-tae

Chief of the hematology department of Taemin Hospital; son of VBT-01 discoverer Jung Han-su

- Jo Jae-yoon as Woo Il-nam
- Jung Suk-yong as Lee Ho-yong
- Gong Jung-hwan as Gerard Kim
- Park Jun-myun as Lee Young-joo

People around Jae-wook

- Park Young-rin (Note: Credited as Park Tae-in.) as Seo Hye-ri

A human being who wants to be a vampire who works as director of Jae-wook's drug development research using the VBT-01 virus

- Kwon Hyun-sang as Nam Chul-hoon

A vampire; one of Jae-wook's henchmen

- Lee Ji-hoon as J

A vampire; one of Jae-wook's henchmen

- Kang Sung-min as Joo In-ho

A vampire; he replaced Seo Hye-ri as director Jae-wook's drug development research

=== Others ===
- Jung Hae-in as Joo Hyun-woo

A medical researcher and Ji-sang's close friend

- Nam Myeong-ryeol as Jung Han-su

A renowned medical researcher and the father of hematology doctor Jung Ji-tae. He discovered the VBT-01 virus, which gives vampiric traits to anyone who is infected. Though the virus can extend life and give superhuman powers to its infectees, he stops his research for the virus's potential as a source of evil and chaos, to which his former mentee Jae-wook is vehemently against. He is killed by Jae-wook, who had infected himself with the virus for his personal gain.

- Ryu Soo-young as Park Hyun-seo

Ji-sang's father. Along with his wife Sun-young and Jae-wook, he is a mentee and fellow researcher of Dr. Jung Han-su. A vampire/VBT-01 infectee, he and Sun-young were against Jae-wook's plan in using the virus in human enhancement. He is killed by Jae-wook who raided the couple's house in search for the baby Ji-sang.

- Park Joo-mi as Han Sun-young

Ji-sang's mother. Along with her husband Hyun-se and Jae-wook, she is a mentee and fellow researcher of Dr. Jung Han-su. A vampire/VBT-01 infectee, she was also against Jae-wook's plan in using the virus in human enhancement. She escaped to Jeju with the baby Ji-sang when Jae-wook raided their house in search for the child. She was killed later on by Jae-wook's henchmen.

- Son Sook as Sylvia Ahn

An old nun who became Ri-ta/Chae-eun's mother figure. She was the one who gave Ri-ta her second name.

- Ahn Ji-hwan as voice of Luuvy

An AI robot invented by Hyun-woo

== Original soundtrack ==
Blood OST

Soundtrack album by Various artists
- Recorded: 2015
- Genre: Soundtrack
- Languages: Korean; English
- Labels: Loen Entertainment; The Groove Entertainment; Bridge Music

=== Part 1 ===
Released on February 24, 2015
No.	Title	Artist	Length
1.	"Only One" (오직 하나)	Tiffany Young (Girls' Generation)	3:20
2.	"Only One" (Inst.)		3:20
Total length:			6:40

=== Part 2 ===
Released on March 16, 2015
No.	Title	Artist	Length
1.	"Be Alright" (괜찮아)	Song Haye	3:53
2.	"Be Alright" (Inst.)		3:53
Total length:			7:06

=== Part 3 ===
Released on March 23, 2015
No.	Title	Artist	Length
1.	"I can't stop loving you" (나는 너를 사랑할 수 없어)	Ha Hyun-woo	4:09
2.	"I can't stop loving you" (Inst.)		4:09
Total length:			8:18

=== Part 4 ===
Released on April 18, 2015
No.	Title	Artist	Length
1.	"Cell" (세포)	MC Meta (ft.Taru and Jin-hyun)	3:40
2.	"Cell" (Inst.)		3:40
Total length:			7:40

Disc 2:
No.	Title	Artist	Length
1.	"Blood (Opening Theme)"	Various Artists	2:48
2.	"Dream"	Various Artists	2:37
3.	"Evil"	Various Artists	3:28
4.	"Game of Death"	Various Artists	2:10
5.	"Lifeline"	Various Artists	3:10
6.	"Love and Salvation"	Various Artists	2:36
7.	"Someone's Plan"	Various Artists	2:55
8.	"Survivor"	Various Artists	2:27
9.	"The Legend"	Various Artists	2:31
10.	"The Passion Sadness"	Various Artists	4:08
11.	"Vampire's Love"	Various Artists	3:41
12.	"Vampire vs Vampire"	Various Artists	3:38
13.	"Wake up"	Various Artists	1:45

== Ratings ==
Episode #	Original broadcast date	Average audience share			
Episode #	Original broadcast date	TNmS Ratings		AGB Nielsen	
Episode #	Original broadcast date	Nationwide	Seoul National Capital Area	Nationwide	Seoul National Capital Area
1	February 16, 2015	5.3%	6.0%	5.2%	6.0%
2	February 17, 2015	4.9%	5.3%	4.7%	5.1%
3	February 23, 2015	6.1%	6.3%	6.0%	6.2%
4	February 24, 2015	5.8%	5.9%	5.5%	5.6%
5	March 2, 2015	4.6%	4.5%	4.1%	6.5%
6	March 3, 2015	5.5%	5.5%	5.4%	5.4%
7	March 9, 2015	4.4%	5.2%	4.4%	5.2%
8	March 10, 2015	4.4%	4.7%	4.5%	4.8%
9	March 16, 2015	4.6%	4.6%	4.3%	4.3%
10	March 17, 2015	5.1%	4.9%	5.6%	5.4%
11	March 23, 2015	4.4%	3.7%	3.8%	3.1%
12	March 24, 2015	4.9%	4.0%	4.5%	3.6%
13	March 30, 2015	4.8%	4.9%	4.2%	4.3%
14	March 31, 2015	5.6%	6.4%	5.3%	5.0%
15	April 6, 2015	5.3%	5.5%	4.4%	4.6%
16	April 7, 2015	5.3%	5.5%	5.0%	5.2%
17	April 13, 2015	5.3%	5.4%	3.8%	3.9%
18	April 14, 2015	5.3%	5.0%	4.4%	4.1%
19	April 20, 2015	6.4%	6.5%	4.7%	4.8%
20	April 21, 2015	5.4%	5.5%	5.0%	5.1%
Average		5.2%	5.3%	4.7%	4.8%

== Awards and nominations ==
Year	Award	Category	Recipient	Result
2015	KBS Drama Awards	Excellence Award, Actor in a Mid-length Drama	Ji Jin-hee	Nominated
2015	KBS Drama Awards	Netizen Award, Actor	Ahn Jae-hyun	Nominated
2015	KBS Drama Awards	Netizen Award, Actress	Ku Hye-sun	Nominated
2015	KBS Drama Awards	Best Couple Award	Ahn Jae-hyun and Ku Hye-sun	Nominated

== See also ==
- List of vampire television series
