= Öndög =

2019 film

- Film poster
- Directed by: Wang Quan'an
- Written by: Wang Quan'an
- Produced by: Wang Quan'an
- Starring: Aorigeletu; Dulamjav Enkhtaivan; Norovsambuu
- Cinematography: Aymerick Pilarski
- Edited by: Yang Wenjian
- Production company: Mogo Film Labs
- Release date: 8 February 2019 (Berlin)
- Running time: 100 minutes
- Country: Mongolia

Öndög is a 2019 Mongolian drama film directed by Wang Quan'an. It was selected to compete for the Golden Bear at the 69th Berlin International Film Festival. It won the Grand Prix at Film Fest Gent, as well as the Golden Spike for Best Picture at the Valladolid International Film Festival. It follows the story of a herder who is asked to guard a crime scene in Mongolia.

== Cast ==
- Aorigeletu
- Dulamjav Enkhtaivan
- Norovsambuu
