= The Chainbreakers =

2017 Chinese film by Yang Rui

- Traditional Chinese: 金珠瑪米
- Simplified Chinese: 金珠玛米
- Hanyu Pinyin: Jīnzhū Mǎmǐ
- Directed by: Yang Rui
- Written by: Yang Rui; Shan Yu; Da Zhen
- Starring: Tobgyal (Duobujie); Lobsang Namdak; Wang Ziyi; Yang Xiucuo; Ngawang Rinchen
- Production companies: Beijing Quansheng Shiji Films Co., Ltd.
- Release dates: 21 June 2017 (Shanghai International Film Festival); 12 December 2017 (China)
- Running time: 97 minutes
- Country: China
- Language: Mandarin

The Chainbreakers (Chinese: 金珠玛米) is a 2017 Chinese Tibet-themed epic film co-written and directed by Yang Rui, and stars Tobgyal, Lobsang Namdak, Wang Ziyi, Yang Xiucuo and Ngawang Rinchen. The film was released on December 8, 2017, in China. The film picks up the story of the People's Liberation Army (PLA) soldier Hua Shan participated in the annexation of Tibet by the People's Republic of China and his contradiction of local Tibetan tribal chief, bandit and butler.

== Plot ==
In the autumn of 1950, the 18th Army of the People's Liberation Army (PLA) march to Chamdo, Tibet from Sichuan, they plan to annex Tibet and free all the slaves.

== Cast ==
- Tobgyal
- Lobsang Namdak
- Wang Ziyi as Hua Shan, a soldier of the People's Liberation Army (PLA).
- Yang Xiucuo
- Ngawang Rinchen

== Production ==
In 2010, the producers began to negotiate with Yang Rui and Shan Yu, as well as Da Zhen, to write the film. In 2015, Yang Rui was signed to direct the film.

This film was shot in Tibet Autonomous Region, China.

The film's major cast members are all Tibetan natives except the lead actor Wang Ziyi.

== Release ==
The film premiered at the Shanghai International Film Festival on June 21, 2017, and opened in China on December 8, 2017. On November 29, 2017, Yang Rui, Tobgyal and Lobsang Namdak attended the premiere for the film at Beijing Film Academy.
