= Feed Me (film) =

- 哺乳期的女人
- Directed by: Yang Yazhou; Yang Bo
- Starring: Yu Nan; Tao Zeru; Lin Hao; Vivian Wu
- Release dates: August 29, 2013 (Montreal); May 22, 2015 (China)
- Running time: 91 minutes
- Country: China
- Language: Mandarin
- Box office: CN¥60,000 (China)

Feed Me (Chinese: 哺乳期的女人) is a 2013 Chinese drama film directed by Yang Yazhou and Yang Bo. It was shown at the Montreal World Film Festival on August 29, 2013, and was released in China on May 22, 2015.

== Cast ==
- Yu Nan
- Tao Zeru
- Lin Hao
- Vivian Wu

== Reception ==
The film won the Prix de l’innovation (Innovation award) at the 2013 Montreal World Film Festival.

By May 23, 2015, the film had earned CN¥60,000 at the Chinese box office.
