= Weaving Girl =

- Film poster
- Simplified Chinese: 纺织姑娘
- Hanyu Pinyin: fǎng zhī gū niáng
- Directed by: Wang Quan'an
- Written by: Wang Quan'an
- Starring: Yu Nan; Guo Tao
- Cinematography: Lutz Reitemeier
- Edited by: Wang Quan'an; Wu Yixiang
- Distributed by: China Film Promotion International (Worldwide); Pretty Pictures (France)
- Release date: September 1, 2009 (Montreal World Film Festival)
- Language: Mandarin

Weaving Girl is a 2009 Chinese film directed by Wang Quan'an. Wang's fourth feature film, Weaving Girl stars Wang's frequent collaborator and former partner, actress Yu Nan.

== Title ==
According to director Wang Quan'an, the film's title, Weaving Girl, is a reference to a Soviet worker's song that was popularized in China during the 1950s.

== Reception ==
Weaving Girl won both the FIPRESCI prize and the Jury Grand Prize at the 2009 Montreal World Film Festival.
