= Pretty Big Feet =

2002 Chinese film

- Film poster
- Traditional Chinese: 美麗的大腳
- Simplified Chinese: 美丽的大脚
- Literal meaning: Beautiful Big Feet
- Hanyu Pinyin: Měilì de dà jiǎo
- Directed by: Yang Yazhou
- Written by: Li Wei
- Produced by: Yan Yiyun; Wu Dashen
- Starring: Ni Ping; Yuan Quan; Sun Haiying; Xu Yajun; Yang Jiahe
- Cinematography: Wang Xiaoming
- Edited by: Ding Ruan; Wei Dong
- Music by: Zhao Jiping
- Production companies: Xi'an Film Studio; China Television Media
- Release date: 28 October 2002
- Running time: 103 minutes
- Country: China
- Languages: Lanyin Mandarin; Standard Mandarin

Pretty Big Feet, released in the United States as For the Children, is a 2002 Chinese drama film directed by Yang Yazhou. It stars Ni Ping as a teacher in an extremely impoverished and barren town in Ningxia, and Yuan Quan as a volunteer teacher coming from Beijing to help the local education.

The film won 4 awards at the Golden Rooster Awards.

== Awards ==
Award	Category	Individual	Result
2002 Golden Rooster Awards (22nd)	Best Picture		Won
2002 Golden Rooster Awards (22nd)	Best Director	Yang Yazhou	Won
2002 Golden Rooster Awards (22nd)	Best Actress	Ni Ping	Won
2002 Golden Rooster Awards (22nd)	Best Supporting Actress	Yuan Quan	Won
2002 Golden Rooster Awards (22nd)	Best Supporting Actor	Sun Haiying	Nominated
2002 Golden Rooster Awards (22nd)	Best Writing	Li Wei	Nominated
2002 Golden Rooster Awards (22nd)	Best Cinematographer	Wang Xiaoming	Nominated
2003 Beijing College Student Film Festival	Best Actress	Ni Ping	Won
2003 Golden Phoenix Awards	Best Actress	Ni Ping	Won
2003 Huabiao Awards	Huabiao Award for Outstanding Actress	Ni Ping	Won
2003 Huabiao Awards	Huabiao Award for Outstanding Director	Yang Yazhou	Won
2003 Huabiao Awards	Huabiao Award for Outstanding Actress	Yuan Quan	Nominated
2003 Hundred Flowers Awards	Best Supporting Actress	Yuan Quan	Won
