= Students' Choice Award for Favorite Actor =

Film award category

The Students' Choice Award for Favorite Actor(Chinese: 北京大学生电影节最受欢迎男演员奖) is a main category of Beijing College Student Film Festival.

== Winners ==
Year	Recipient(s)	Film(s)
2023	Zhu Yilong	Lighting Up the Stars
2022	Lu Qi	A Man of the People
2021	Zhang Yi	My People, My Country
2019	Chen Xiao	Lost in Love
2018	Dong Chengpeng	City of Rock
2017	Zhang Hanyu	Operation Mekong
2016	Li Chen	MBA Partners
2015	Lu Han	20 Once Again
2014	Feng Shaofeng	Young Detective Dee: Rise of the Sea Dragon
2013	Wang Baoqiang	Lost in Thailand
2012	Wen Zhang	Love is Not Blind
2011	Wen Zhang	Ocean Heaven
2010	Huang Xiaoming	The Message
2009	Fan Wei	Set Of
2008	Hou Yong	The First of August
2007	Chen Kun	The Knot
2006	Xia Yu	The Law Of Romance
2005	Feng Gong	Haste Makes Waste
2004	Jiang Wen	Warriors of Heaven and Earth
2004	Chen Kun	Baobei in Love
2003	Ge You	Cala, My Dog!
2002	Ge You	Funeral of the Famous Star
2001	Chen Jianbin	Chrysanthemum Tea
2000	Pu Cunxin	Shower
1999	Feng Gong	A Tree in House
1998	Ge You	The Dream Factory
