= Ni Ping =

Chinese actress

- 倪萍
- Born: Yu Peiwen; 16 February 1959 (age 67); Weihai, Shandong, China
- Occupation: Actress
- Years active: 1999–present
- Awards: Montreal World Film Festival; Best Actress; 2006 Snow in the WindHuabiao Awards – Outstanding Actress; 2003 Pretty Big Feet Golden Rooster Awards – Best Actress; 2003 Pretty Big Feet Golden Eagle Awards – Best Supporting Actress; 2003 Snow City

Chinese name
- Traditional Chinese: 倪萍
- Simplified Chinese: 倪萍
Transcriptions
Standard Mandarin
- Hanyu Pinyin: Ní Píng

Ni Ping (born 16 February 1959) is a Chinese actress and TV host. Ni began her career as an actress in the 1980s before transitioning to a television host in the 1990s. She is best known for hosting the CCTV variety program Zongyi Daguan in the early 90s and the CCTV Spring Festival Gala from 1991 to 2003.

== Filmography ==
Year	English Title	Chinese Title	Role	Notes
1987	Snow City	雪城	Yao Yuhui	Golden Eagle Award for Best Supporting Actress
2002	Pretty Big Feet	美麗的大腳	Zhang Meili	Beijing College Student Film Festival for Best Actress; Golden Rooster Award for Best Actress; Huabiao Award for Outstanding Actress
2006	Snow in the Wind	雪花那個飄	Wang Yanmei	Montreal World Film Festival for Best Actress
