= Wang Quan'an =

Chinese film director (born 1965)

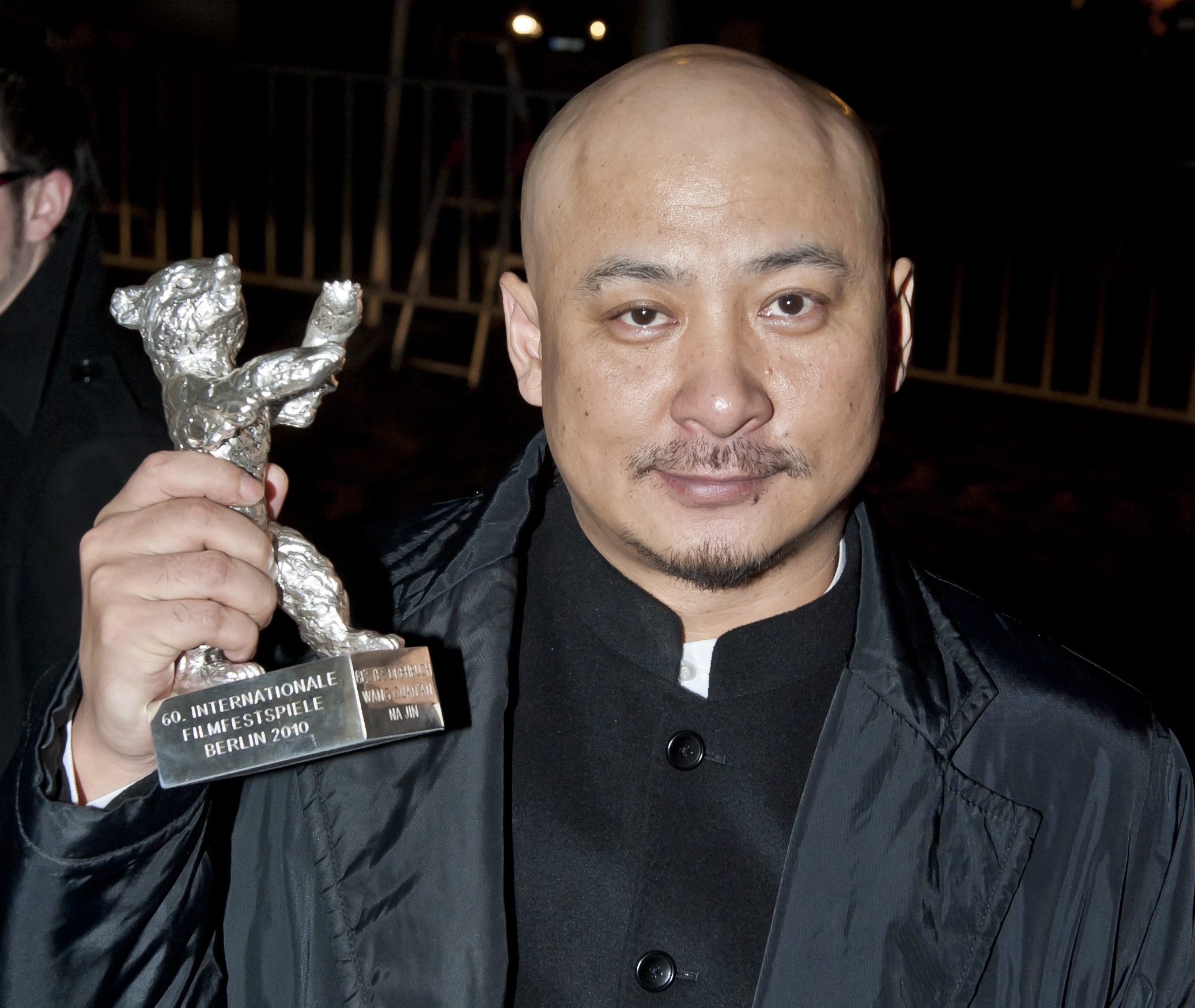
- Wang Quan'an, winner of the Best Screenplay award at the Berlin Film Festival 2010
- Born: 1965; Yan'an, Shaanxi
- Occupation: Film director
- Years active: 1990s-present
- Spouse: Zhang Yuqi (m. 2011; div. 2015)
- Awards: Golden Bear; 2006 Tuya's Marriage

Wang Quan'an (Chinese: 王全安; pinyin: Wáng Quán'ān) (b. 1965) is a Sixth Generation Chinese film director. Wang was born in Yan'an, China. He graduated from the Beijing Film Academy in 1991. He had a ten-year relationship with actress and muse Yu Nan, which ended in 2009.

== Career ==
Unlike many of his contemporaries, who focus on urban life, Wang's films have often emphasized China's rural life, including Jingzhe and Tuya's Marriage (2007). Wang's films have also often focused on female protagonists, including his first four films, who all starred actress Yu Nan. Wang's 2009 film, Weaving Girl took him to familiar territory, exploring working class female experiences in modern-day China.

Wang's most recent film, Apart Together—his first without Yu Nan in the starring role—follows an old Kuomintang soldier who returns to China from Taiwan after fifty years to find his first love. Apart Together opened the 2010 Berlin International Film Festival.

In 2011, Wang Quan'an and Zhang Yuqi had a whirlwind romance, and they married on April 18 of that year. Zhang announced they were divorced on July 2, 2015.

On 15 September 2014, Wang Quan'an and a woman were arrested in Beijing for prostitution.

=== Honors and awards ===
Since his debut film, Lunar Eclipse, in 1999, Wang has achieved success on the international film festival circuit. Most notably, he was awarded the prestigious Golden Bear at the 2007 Berlin International Film Festival for his film, Tuya's Marriage. The win was the third time a Chinese film had been awarded the Berlinale's top award, after Xie Fei's Woman Sesame Oil Maker and Zhang Yimou's debut film, Red Sorghum. He also won the Best Screenplay award for Apart Together at the 60th Berlin International Film Festival with co-writer Jin Na. The award was presented to him on stage by jury member and former partner Yu Nan.

In February 2017, Wang was a member of the jury for the 2017 Berlin Film Festival.

== Filmography ==
=== As director ===
Year	English Title	Chinese Title	Notes
1999	Lunar Eclipse	月蚀	Entered into the 22nd Moscow International Film Festival
2004	Jingzhe	惊蛰	Also known as Story of Ermei
2006	Tuya's Marriage	图雅的婚事	Winner of the Golden Bear at the 2007 Berlin Film Festival
2009	Weaving Girl	纺织姑娘	Winner of the Grand Jury Prize at the 2009 Montreal World Film Festival
2010	Apart Together	團圓	Winner of the Best Screenplay award at the 60th Berlin International Film Festival
2011	White Deer Plain	白鹿原	Entered into the 62nd Berlin International Film Festival
2019	Öndög	恐龙蛋	Entered into the 69th Berlin International Film Festival
