= Tuya's Marriage =

- Film poster
- Traditional Chinese: 圖雅的婚事
- Simplified Chinese: 图雅的婚事
- Hanyu Pinyin: túyǎ de hūnshì
- Directed by: Wang Quan'an
- Written by: Wang Quan'an; Lu Wei
- Produced by: Yan Ju Gang
- Starring: Yu Nan
- Cinematography: Lutz Reitemeier
- Edited by: Wang Quan'an
- Distributed by: China Film Group
- Release date: September 21, 2006 (China)
- Running time: 86 minutes
- Country: China
- Language: Mandarin

Tuya's Marriage is a 2006 Chinese film directed by Wang Quan'an. The film depicts life in Inner Mongolia, in a region where the decline in groundwater is making life hard for sheep herders. It tells the story of Tuya and her husband, Bater, who agree to divorce in the hope of finding a husband who will be prepared to look after both of them and their children. Nan Yu played the role of Tuya; many male cast members were played by non-actors with the same name as their character.

== Plot ==
After sheep herder Tuya's husband, Bater, is disabled while digging a well, Tuya takes on herding and water carrying duties to support him and their two young children. She dislocates her back helping an accident prone neighbour, Senge, not for the first time, who is pinned under his light three wheel truck carrying her hay. The injury, exacerbating long term wear, means that further manual work could result in paralysis. Bater suggests they divorce so she can find a man to support all three of them.

Tuya eventually must choose between Senge, whose wife has run away, and who says he will divorce her to marry Tuya, and Baolier, a divorced schoolmate of Tuya who has become wealthy after discovering oil, and who prevails after he promises to place Bater in a nursing home. However, Bater feels abandoned and attempts suicide.

== Awards ==
The film won the Golden Bear at the 2007 Berlin Film Festival as well as the 8th Chinese Film Media Awards for Best Film and Best Actress from Southern Metropolis Daily.

== Critical reception ==
The film received generally positive reviews from Western critics. The review aggregator Rotten Tomatoes reported that 90% of critics gave the film positive reviews, based on 30 reviews. Metacritic reported the film had an average score of 71 out of 100, based on 13 reviews. The film was a New York Times Critic's Pick.

== Credits ==
Director: Quan'an Wang

Writers: Wei Lu, Quan'an Wang

Cast:

- Tuya: Nan Yu
- Bater: Ba'toer
- Senge: Sen'ge
- Baolier: Bao'lier
