= Mountain Patrol: Kekexili =

2004 film by Lu Chuan

- Film poster
- Chinese: 可可西里
- Literal meaning: Hoh Xil
- Hanyu Pinyin: Kěkěxīlǐ
- Jyutping: ho2 ho2 sai1 lei5
- Directed by: Lu Chuan
- Written by: Lu Chuan
- Produced by: Du Yang; Wang Zhonglei
- Starring: Qi Liang; Tobgyal (Duo Bujie)
- Cinematography: Cao Yu
- Music by: Zai Lao
- Production companies: Columbia Pictures Film Production Asia; Huayi Brothers; Taihe Film Investment
- Distributed by: Huayi Brothers
- Release date: 1 October 2004
- Running time: 90 minutes
- Country: China
- Languages: Mandarin; Tibetan
- Budget: $1.2 million (est.)

Mountain Patrol: Kekexili (Chinese: 可可西里; Standard Tibetan: ཨ་ཆེན་གངས་རྒྱབ།) is a 2004 Chinese film directed by Lu Chuan that depicts the struggle between vigilante rangers and bands of poachers in the remote Tibetan region of Kekexili.

Despite its realistic, detached style, the film evokes the dramatic Western genre in several ways. This includes the portrayal of a masculine, harsh way of life and culture of honour at the frontier of civilization; but also the depiction of a rugged, majestic landscape (captured to great effect by cinematographer Cao Yu) that becomes a star of the film. This characterization is made explicit when the characters profess their love for their homeland, whose very name evokes "beautiful mountains, beautiful maidens" to them.

The film was inspired by the Wild Yak Brigade, a real-life volunteer group that patrolled the Tibetan Plateau during the 1990s, and events that took place between 1993 and 1996.

== Plot ==
The film opens with the summary execution of a patrol member by poachers and then follows, in quasi-documentary style, reporter Ga Yu (played by Zhang Lei) who is sent from Beijing to investigate. In Kekexili he meets Ritai (character based on Sonam Dargye, played by Tibetan actor Tobgyal, or Duo Bujie (多布杰) in Mandarin) at the Sky burial of the deceased patrol member. Ritai is the leader of the vigilantes who, despite poverty and the lack of any government support, roam the land to protect the endangered Tibetan antelope from extinction. Admitted into the patrol, Ga becomes a sort of embedded journalist in the hunt for the poachers across Kekexili.

The patrol team hunts down a family of poachers and learns from them the whereabouts of their gunman and leader. But the long journey means they can no longer afford to follow on with the entire team and captured poachers. They release the poachers and send one of the cars, driven by Liu Dong (played by Qi Liang), back with the injured and sick team members to the hospital. He does not have sufficient funds for the medical fees and Ritai tells him to sell some antelope skins to raise the money. Ga questioned the sales of antelope skins and learns from Ritai that they have received no funds from the government for at least a year.

The two remaining vehicles continue the search but one of them breaks down. Ritai ask them to wait for the other car to return and pick them up, but severe weather forces them to trek their way home. Liu Dong, travelling alone on the way back to join Ritai with his vehicle fully stocked with supplies, is swallowed by dry quicksand when his vehicle gets stuck.

Ritai and Ga finally finds the gunman and leader. But, outnumbered and outgunned, Ritai is killed by the poacher. Ga is free to go as he is not a patrol member. Ritai's body is brought back home for a Sky burial.

Captions at the end of the film state that Ga's reports on the atrocities in Kekexili shook the country. After the authorities initially arrested four patrol members for selling pelts, public pressure had them released, but the patrol is nevertheless disbanded. A year later the Chinese government declared Kekexili a "national nature preserve" and established a forestry bureau to protect it. The captions further state that antelope numbers increased to 30,000 at the time of the film's release.

== Production history ==
Tibetan nomads wearing chuba and their yak hair tent in the early 20th-century Tibet

The film was shot on location in Kekexili, in both Mandarin and the Tibetan language. Except for the two leads Qi and Tobgyal, all of the cast is made of Tibetan amateur actors. Despite the low budget, development benefited from much corporate support, being funded in majority by Columbia Pictures, Warner Bros. and Canon.

The harsh conditions took their toll on the film crew with several members falling ill, including director Lu. Also Alex Graf, production manager from Columbia Pictures, was killed on location in a car accident at age 32.

In order to re-enact the shooting death of a Tibetan Antelope, the filmmakers acquired a Mongolian Gazelle (a second-class protected species under Chinese law) from a nearby reserve, fixed Tibetan antelope antlers to it, and then filmed as the animal was killed. According to lead actor Zhang Lei, the crew was upset about this as some had grown affectionate towards the animal actor. The animal was later buried.

== Reception ==
Kekexili was among the few Mainland Chinese films to win the Golden Horse Best Film Award in Taiwan's Golden Horse Film Festival, in 2004. It also won the Special Jury Prize at the Tokyo International Film Festival in the same year.

The film had a profound impact in China in bringing attention the region and the plight of its inhabitants and endangered species. This led the Chinese government to offer much-delayed support to the protection of local species, and played a large part in the proposal of the Tibetan antelope as a candidate for official mascot of the 2008 Summer Olympics.

=== Critical response ===
On review aggregator Rotten Tomatoes, the film has a score of 98% based on 50 reviews, and an average rating of 7.6/10. The website's critical consensus reads, "In a setting both visually stunning and cruel, this Eastern film evokes the epic spirit of old-fashioned Westerns." On Metacritic, it has an average score of 77/100 based on 23 critics, indicating "generally favorable reviews".

=== Awards and nominations ===
- Golden Horse Film Festival, 2004
  - Best Picture
  - Best Cinematography — Cao Yu
  - Best Director — Lu Chuan (nominated)
  - Best Actor — Duobujie (nominated)
  - Best Original Screenplay — Lu Chuan (nominated)
- Tokyo International Film Festival, 2004
  - Special Jury Prize
  - Grand Prix (nominated)
- Golden Rooster Awards, 2005
  - Best Film (shared with On the Mountain of Tai Hang)
- Berlin International Film Festival, 2005
  - Don Quixote Award
- Sundance Film Festival, 2005
  - Grand Jury Prize (nominated)
- Huabiao Film Awards, 2005
  - Outstanding Film
  - Outstanding Director — Lu Chuan
- Hong Kong Film Awards, 2006
  - Best Asian Film
