= Jin Na (screenwriter) =

Chinese actress and screenwriter

- Born: China
- Occupations: Screenwriter, Actress
- Years active: 2010- present

Jin Na (Chinese: 金娜, born in Shanghai in 1975) is a Chinese actress and writer.

She jointly won the Best Script award at the 60th Berlin International Film Festival for the film Apart Together.
