= Zhou Yu's Train =

2002 Chinese-Hong Kong film by Sun Zhou

- U.S. theatrical poster
- Directed by: Sun Zhou
- Written by: Sun Zhou; Zhang Mei; Bei Cun (novel)
- Produced by: Huang Jianxin; William Kong; Sun Zhou
- Starring: Gong Li; Tony Leung Ka-Fai; Sun Honglei
- Cinematography: Wang Yu
- Edited by: William Chang
- Music by: Shigeru Umebayashi
- Distributed by: Sony Pictures Classics
- Release date: August 1, 2002 (China)
- Running time: 92 minutes
- Countries: China; Hong Kong
- Language: Mandarin

Zhou Yu's Train (simplified Chinese: 周渔的火车; traditional Chinese: 周漁的火車; pinyin: zhōu yú de huǒchē) is a 2002 film based on a novella by Bei Cun. The film is a Chinese-Hong Kong co-production directed by Sun Zhou, and starring Gong Li, Tony Leung Ka-Fai and Sun Honglei.

The title refers to a poetic compilation published by the character in the movie played by Leung. The story starts at a book signing event and leads to the memories of the two lovers encounters. Zhou Yu maintained the relationship by commuting on the train, hence the title of the movie.

== Synopsis ==
The story is set in Chongyang (Hubei province, China) and Sanming (Fujian province). Zhou Yu, a ceramics artist from Sanming falls in love with the poet Chen Qing, who lives in Chongyang, a town several hundred kilometers from Sanming. During the train trips between Sanming and Chongyang, she also meets Zhang Qiang, a veterinary surgeon.

Gong Li plays two characters who only differ by their hair styles, namely Zhou Yu and the short-haired Xiu. The film is pieced together with many flashbacks in no particular chronological order. The relationship between the two women is unclear until the end of the film.
