= Jingzhe (film) =

- Film poster
- Traditional Chinese: 驚蜇
- Simplified Chinese: 惊蜇
- Hanyu Pinyin: Jīng zhē
- Directed by: Wang Quan'an
- Written by: Wang Quan'an
- Produced by: Wang Quan'an; Song Dai
- Starring: Yu Nan
- Cinematography: Lutz Reitemeier
- Edited by: Wang Quan'an
- Music by: Zhang Yang
- Distributed by: Xiying Huayi Film Distribution Co.
- Release date: February 10, 2004 (Berlin)
- Running time: 115 minutes
- Language: Mandarin

Jingzhe is a 2004 Chinese film directed by Wang Quan'an. The film is Wang's second feature and sees him reuniting with actress Yu Nan. Jingzhe is also known by its original international title, The Story of Ermei.

Jingzhe tells the story of Ermei (played by Yu Nan), a young villager in rural China. When Ermei's family falls on hard financial times, she is forced to marry off to an alcoholic villager so her family can collect the bride price. Unhappy in her married life, Ermei runs away to the city where she finds work at a restaurant. She has an affair with a man named Qiao but soon returns to her drunkard husband, where an emergency forces her to take initiative in her relationship.

Jingzhe was screened in several international film festivals throughout 2004, including the high profile Berlin International Film Festival on February 10, 2004, where it was part of the "Panorama" program.

== Title ==
The title of the film, Jingzhe (simplified Chinese: 惊蜇; traditional Chinese: 驚蜇; pinyin: Jīng zhē), is one of the twenty-four periods of the ancient Chinese calendar. In particular, "Jingzhe" refers to the third solar term, which falls on March 5–6 and marks the start of spring.

The English title used for international audiences, originally Story of Ermei, was eventually abandoned in favor of the pinyin transcription of the original title, Jingzhe.

== Plot ==
When Guan Ermei's (Yu Nan) grandfather falls terminally ill, her poor farming family is forced into a crisis. Selling their pigs in order to purchase cedar in order to make a casket, they discover that the money from the sale is insufficient to purchase the wood. Guan Ermei's father therefore attempts to illegally cut down a cedar tree when he is caught and fined. Even further in debt, the family arranges to sell Ermei to Zhang Suo, a drunken but wealthy peasant. Ermei, disgusted with her future husband, flees to the city and seeks out her friend Maonu (Shi Xiaoxia). Maonu sets Ermei with a job in a restaurant run by Yu, and also introduces her to a young man, Qian Liansheng.

Soon, Ermei and Liansheng have fallen in love, although Liansheng remains unfaithful to Ermei. Ermei eventually returns home and marries Zhang Suo, bearing him a child. When her son falls ill, Ermei takes the family back to the city to see a doctor and her friend Maonu. Maonu, however, has moved to the south. Enamored with the idea of seeing the sea, the family returns home after Ermei's son has recovered. At first despondent, Ermei discovers the joy of simply playing with her son.

== Cast ==
- Yu Nan as Guan Ermei, a young twenty-year-old woman in a rural village.
- Liu Yanbing as Qian Liansheng, a young man who has an affair with Ermei.
- Yan Su as Zhang Suo, a local drunk, who nevertheless pays the Guans three thousand RMB.
- Shi Xiaoxia as Maonu, Ermei's childhood friend who has moved to a nearby city.
- Ma Zhen as Yu, a local restaurateur; Ma Zhen is in fact, an actual restaurant owner.

== Awards and nominations ==
- Golden Rooster Awards, 2003
  - Best Actress — Yu Nan
- Festival Paris Cinéma, 2004
  - Best Actress — Yu Nan (Tied with Anne Parillaud for Deadlines)
  - Grand Prix (nominated)
