= Cala, My Dog! =

- Film poster
- Traditional Chinese: 卡拉是條狗
- Simplified Chinese: 卡拉是条狗
- Hanyu Pinyin: Kǎlā shì tiáo gǒu
- Directed by: Lu Xuechang
- Written by: Lu Xuechang
- Produced by: Feng Xiaogang; Wang Zhonglei; Wang Zhongjun
- Starring: Ge You; Ding Jiali; Li Qinqin; Xia Yu
- Cinematography: Zhang Xigui
- Edited by: Kong Jinglei
- Music by: Xiang Min
- Distributed by: Celestial Pictures
- Release date: February 2, 2003 (China)
- Running time: 100 minutes
- Language: Mandarin

Cala, My Dog! is a 2003 Chinese comedy film directed by Lu Xuechang. The film had its world premiere at the 2003 Berlin International Film Festival. It was released in China on February 2, 2003. The film follows a blue-collar worker (Ge You) in Beijing as he attempts to acquire a dog license in 18 hours for his beloved unlicensed Cala. The film was co-produced by the successful film director Feng Xiaogang.

Though a comedy, Cala, My Dog! moves at a subdued pace. Despite this, during its world premiere in Berlin, sales agents from Celestial Pictures billed the film as a more zany, traditional comedy.

== Plot ==
Lao Er (Ge You) lives a humdrum life as a laborer in Beijing with his wife Yu Lan (Ding Jiali), his son Liangliang (Li Bin) and his beloved dog, Cala. Lao Er's life is thrown into turmoil when the government in an effort to control rabies, decrees that all unlicensed dogs are to be cast out of the city. When Cala is confiscated during an evening walk, the police give Lao Er eighteen hours until 4:00 in the afternoon of the next day to obtain a license for 5000 RMB ($600), an exorbitant amount of money for a worker in Lao Er's position.

Lao Er, determined to get his dog back, sends his son to coerce an uncle working in the pound to get the dog back. When that fails, he goes to his neighbor (Li Qinqin) in order to use her dog's license to trick the pound. When that too fails, Lao Er becomes desperate, all while dealing with a wife who becomes increasingly jealous over his visits to his neighbor, and a son who is arrested after getting into a fight...

== Cast ==
- Ge You as Lao Er, the film's protagonist, Lao Er, a poor worker in Beijing, is seeking to get his dog Cala back after it is taken away for being unlicensed.
- Ding Jiali as Yu Lan, Lao Er's wife.
- Li Bin as Liangliang, Lao Er's son.
- Li Qinqin as Yang Li, Lao Er's neighbor and friend; her dog is the mother of Cala.
- Xia Yu as the police officer.
- Zhang Dali as Yang Li's ex-husband.

== See also ==
- The Story of Qiu Ju — Zhang Yimou's 1992 satire presents another view on Chinese bureaucracy, admittedly one from an earlier decade.
