= Yu Nan =

Chinese actress

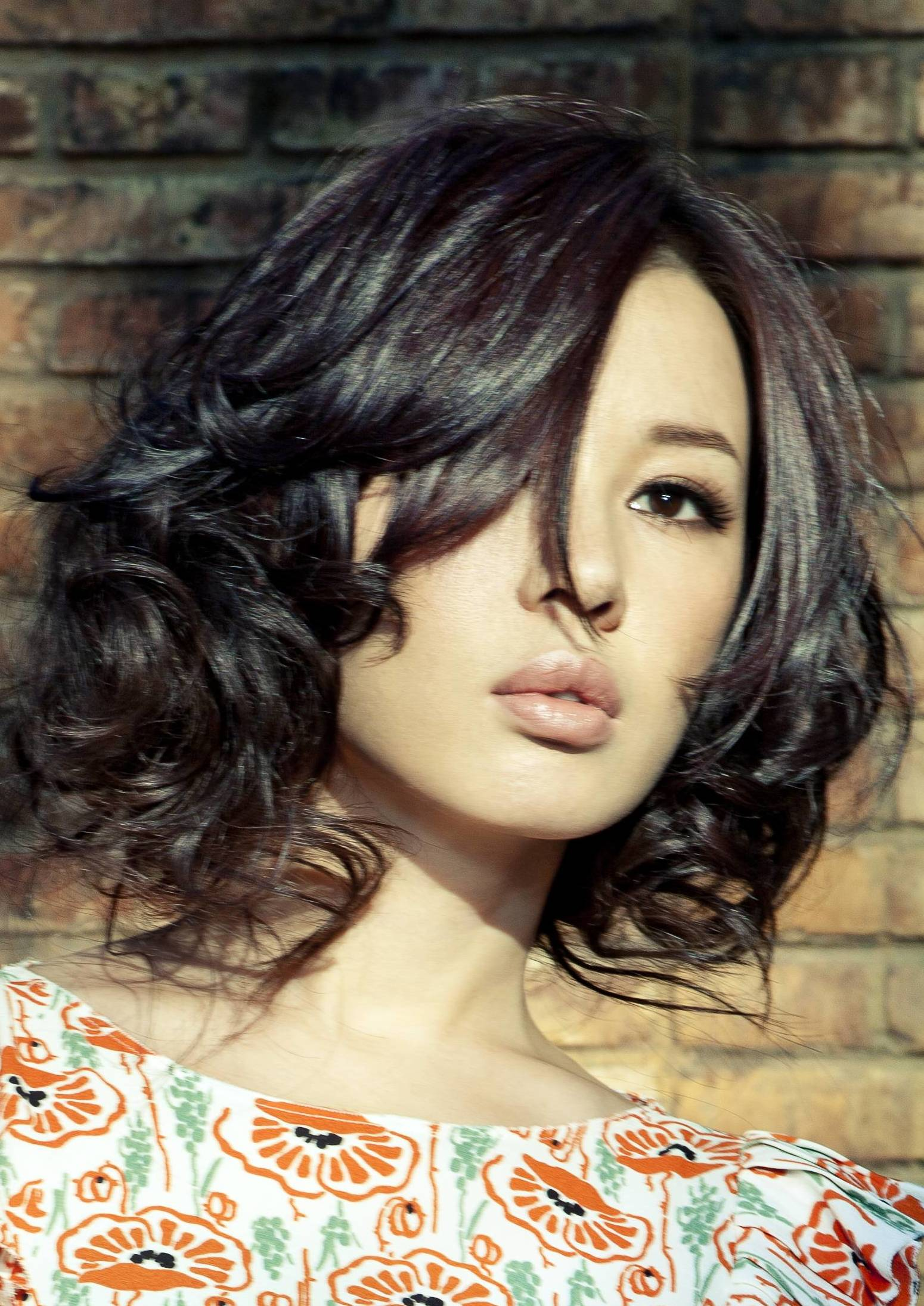
- Yu in 2010
- Born: 5 September 1978 (age 47); Dalian, China
- Occupation: Actress
- Years active: 1999–present
- Awards: Deauville - Best Actress; 2001 Lunar Eclipse; Paris - Best Actress; 2004 Jingzhe; Chicago - Best Actress; 2007 Tuya's Marriage; Golden Rooster Awards – Best Actress; 2003 Jingzhe

Yu Nan (Chinese: 余男, born 5 September 1978) is a Chinese actress. Born in Dalian, Yu Nan studied at the Beijing Film Academy, where she graduated in 1999.

== Career ==
Yu Nan started acting at the age of 4, playing role of a little girl with a handkerchief tied to her dress. Later, instead of following her family's advice to study foreign languages and get a university degree, Yu enrolled at the Beijing Film Academy in 1995.

Her feature film debut in Lunar Eclipse (1999) by Wang Quan'an. Her feisty performance as a shy, retiring wife by day and a wild party animal by night won her Best Actress at the Deauville Asian Film Festival. The recognition caught the attention of French producers, who cast her in Rage (2003).

She subsequently starred in three more films with Wang Quan'an. Jingzhe (2003) earned her Best Actress accolades at the Golden Rooster Award and Paris International Film Festival in 2003; Tuya's Marriage (2006), the Golden Bear winner at the 2007 Berlin International Film Festival, won her the Best Actress prize from the Chicago International Film Festival for her portrayal of a shepherdess who seeks a new husband after her first one falls ill; and Weaving Girl (2009), which won Jury Special Grand prix and the FIPRESCI prize from the 2009 Montreal World Film Festival.

Yu Nan has also worked with other major Chinese directors, including Wang Xiaoshuai in In Love We Trust (2008), which won the Best Screenplay Silver Bear prize at the 2008 Berlin International Film Festival, Lee Yun-chan's in My DNA Says I Love You and Ning Hao, in his Chinese Western film, No Man's Land (2013).

Helped in part by her fluency in Mandarin, French, and English, Yu Nan has played in several international productions, such as the Canadian-Chinese film Diamond Dogs (2007), and the Hollywood films Speed Racer (2008) and The Expendables 2 (2012).

Known for her success in art house films, Yu also starred in commercial films. In Deadly Delicious (2008), she plays a frustrated wife who discovers her husband's extramarital affair and wants him to pay a price for his infidelity; and also starred in Design of Death (2012), playing a mute widow. Yu's most notable work in recent years include Silent Witness (2013) and Wolf Warriors (2015).

=== Festivals ===
Yu Nan has served as a jury member at several international film festivals:

- Pusan International Film Festival in 2007
- Chicago International Film Festival in 2008
- Golden Rooster Awards in 2009
- Shanghai International Film Festival in 2009
- Berlin International Film Festival in 2010
- Shanghai International Film Festival in 2013

== Filmography ==
Year	English Title	Chinese Title	Role	Notes
1999	Lunar Eclipse	月蚀	Ya Nan	
2003	Rage	狂怒	Chinh	
2004	Jingzhe	惊蛰	Ermei	
2006	Tuya's Marriage	图雅的婚事	Tuya	
2007	My DNA Says I Love You	基因决定我爱你	Marlene	
2007	Diamond Dogs	权杖	Anika	
2008	In Love We Trust	左右	Dong Fan	
2008	Deadly Delicious	双食记	Li Chunyan	
2008	Speed Racer	极速赛车	Horuko Togokahn	
2009	Weaving Girl	纺织姑娘	Lily	
2009	Looking for Jackie	寻找成龙	Director	
2010	Wind Blast	西風烈	Nora	
2011	Lost Child	寻人奇事	Zhang Xiaoyue	
2011	Sleepless Fashion	與時尚同居	Qi Xi	
2012	Design of Death	杀生	Ma Guafu	
2012	The Expendables 2	敢死队2 (Mainland China) 轟天猛將2 (Hong Kong) 浴血任務2 (Taiwan)	Maggie Chan	
2013	Beloved	亲爱	Xui Nin	
2013	Feed Me	哺乳期的女人	A woman	
2013	Silent Witness	全民目击	Zhou Li	
2013	Angel Warriors	铁血娇娃	Bai Xue	
2013	No Man's Land	无人区	Ye Bali	
2014	Beijing Love Story	北京爱情故事	Zhang Lei	
2014	The Taking of Tiger Mountain	智取威虎山	Ma Qinglian	
2015	Wolf Warriors	特种兵之战狼	Long Xiaoyun	
2015	Lovers and Movies	爱我就陪我看电影	Ruo Yao	
2016	Pleasure. Love.	男欢·女爱	Hu Yajie	
2016	Blood of Youth	少年	Han Yun	
2017	Lord of Shanghai	上海王	Xiao Yuegui	
2017	Lost in the Moonlight	夜撩人	Jie Zi	
2017	Explosion	引爆者	Xiao Hong	
2018	Justice in Northwest	西北风云	Gao Qiao	
2018	The Trough			
2019	Fox Hunting			

== Awards ==
Year	Award	Category	Nominated work
2001	4th Deauville Asian Film Festival	Best Actress	Lunar Eclipse
2003	23rd Golden Rooster Awards	Best Actress	Jingzhe
2004	19th Paris International Film Festival	Best Actress	Jingzhe
2004	11th Beijing College Student Film Festival	Best Actress	Jingzhe
2005	10th Golden Phoenix Awards	Society Award	Jingzhe
2007	43rd Chicago International Film Festival	Best Actress	Tuya's Marriage
2008	8th Chinese Film Media Awards	Best Actress	Tuya's Marriage
2008	15th Beijing College Student Film Festival	Students' Choice Award for Favorite Actress	Deadly Delicious
