= Chinese Film Media Awards =

Chinese-language film awards

Chinese Film Media Awards (华语电影传媒大奖) are presented by Southern Metropolis Daily annually to honor excellence in Chinese-language cinema. Though based in mainland China, the awards are open to Chinese-language films from Hong Kong, Taiwan and Singapore.

In 2017, the award was held under the name of 2017 Film Gala, and additional awards were introduced.

== China region ==
=== Major award winners ===
Year	Best Film	Best Director	Best Actor	Best Actress	Best Supporting Actor	Best Supporting Actress	Best Screenwriter
2001; 1st	Yi Yi	Ang Lee for Crouching Tiger, Hidden Dragon	Tony Leung Chiu-wai for In the Mood for Love	Maggie Cheung for In the Mood for Love	—N/a	—N/a	Yau Nai-hoi for The Mission
2002; 2nd	Marriage Certificate	Ning Ying for I Love Beijing	Ge You for Big Shot's Funeral	Lü Liping for Marriage Certificate	—N/a	—N/a	—N/a
2003; 3rd	The Missing Gun	Tian Zhuangzhuang for Springtime in a Small Town	Jiang Wen for The Missing Gun	Huang Suying for Gone is the One Who Held Me the Dearest in the World	—N/a	—N/a	—N/a
2004; 4th	Cala, My Dog!	Lu Xuechang for Cala, My Dog!	Ge You for Cala, My Dog!	Zhang Ziyi for Purple Butterfly	Hu Kun for My Father and I	Li Qinqin for Cala, My Dog!	Xu Jinglei for My Father and I
2005; 5th	Delamu	Tian Zhuangzhuang for Delamu	Alex Fong for One Nite in Mongkok	Rene Liu for A World Without Thieves	Cheung Siu-fai for Throw Down	Bai Ling for Dumplings	Wang Shaudi & Li-Ming Huang for Bear Hug
2006; 6th	Election	Gu Changwei for Peacock	Tony Leung Ka-fai for Election	Zhang Jingchu for Peacock	Yao Anlian for Shanghai Dreams	Lin Chia-yu for The Moon Also Rises	Li Qiang for Peacock
2007; 7th	Crazy Stone	Ning Hao for Crazy Stone	Fu Dalong for The Forest Ranger	Jin Yaqin for You and Me	Huang Bo for Crazy Stone	Lu Yi-ching for Blue Cha Cha	Ning Hao, Zhang Cheng & Yue Xiaojun for Crazy Stone
2008; 8th	Tuya's Marriage	Ann Hui for The Postmodern Life of My Aunt	Zhang Hanyu for Assembly	Yu Nan for Tuya's Marriage	Wang Yanhui for Trouble Makers	Joan Chen for The Sun Also Rises	Wai Ka-Fai & Au Kin-Yee for Mad Detective
2009; 9th	The Way We Are	Ann Hui for The Way We Are	Fan Wei for Lucky Dog	Zhou Xun for The Equation of Love and Death	Wang Xueqi for Forever Enthralled	Chan Lai-wun for The Way We Are	Henry Tsai & Tom Lin Shu-yu for Winds of September
2010; 10th	Cannot Live Without You	Leon Dai for Cannot Live Without You	Chen Wen-pin for Cannot Live Without You	Kara Hui for At the End of Daybreak	Jack Kao for A Place of One's Own	Lu Yi-ching for A Place of One's Own	Alan Mak & Felix Chong for Overheard
2011; 11th	When Love Comes	Jiang Wen for Let the Bullets Fly	Ge You for Let the Bullets Fly	Tang Wei for Crossing Hennessy	Ma Ju-lung for Monga	Li Bin for City Monkey	Chang Tso-chi for When Love Comes
2012; 12th	Seediq Bale	Johnnie To for Life Without Principle	Sean Lau for Life Without Principle	Deanie Ip for A Simple Life	Pu Cunxin for Love for Life	Denise Ho for Life Without Principle	Yau Nai-hoi, Yip Tin-shing, Ben Wong & Jeff Cheung for Life Without Principle
2013; 13th	Lethal Hostage	Gao Qunshu for Beijing Blues	Tony Leung Ka-fai for Cold War	Yan Bingyan for Feng Shui	Chapman To for Diva	Lee Lieh for Touch of the Light	Liu Zhenyun for Back to 1942
2014; 14th	Drug War	Johnnie To for Drug War	Nick Cheung for Unbeatable	Zhang Ziyi for The Grandmaster	Wang Qingxiang for The Grandmaster	Yann Yann Yeo for Ilo Ilo	Anthony Chen for Ilo Ilo
2015; 15th	Blind Massage	Lou Ye for Blind Massage	Qin Hao for Blind Massage	Zhao Wei for Dearest	Chen Jianbin for Paradise in Service	Mei Ting for Blind Massage	Ma Yingli for Blind Massage
2016; 16th	The Assassin	Hou Hsiao-hsien for The Assassin	Feng Xiaogang for Mr. Six	Lü Zhong for Red Amnesia	Wang Qianyuan for Saving Mr. Wu	Lü Hsueh-feng for Thanatos, Drunk	Xu Haofeng for The Final Master
2017; 17th	Small Talk	Pema Tseden for Tharlo	Michael Hui for Kaili Blues	Zhou Dongyu for Soul Mate	Lin Yu-chih for Kaili Blues	Yan Ni for The Wasted Times	Lam Wing-sum, Li Yuan, Xu Yi-meng, Wu Nan for Soul Mate
2018; 18th	Our Time Will Come	Chen Kaige for Legend of the Demon Cat	Duan Yihong for The Looming Storm	Kara Wai for The Bold, the Corrupt, and the Beautiful	Zhang Yi for Brotherhood of Blades II: The Infernal Battlefield	Liu Yin-shang for Cloudy	Mei Feng, Huang Shi for Mr. No Problem
2019; 19th	The Shadow Play	Zhang Ming for The Pluto Moment	Wang Jingchun for So Long, My Son	Song Jia for The Shadow Play	Zhang Songwen for The Shadow Play	Chloe Maayan for The Pluto Moment	Han Jianü, Zhong Wei and Wen Muye for Dying to Survive

=== Newcomer awards ===
Year	Best New Director	Best New Performer
2001	—N/a	—N/a
2002	—N/a	—N/a
2003	Lu Chuan for The Missing Gun	—N/a
2004	Xu Jingleifor My Father and I	—N/a
2005	Wayne Peng for Burning Dreams	Hung Hao-hsuan for Bear Hug
2006	Li Yu for Dam Street	Feng Li for Peacock
2007	Daniel Wu for The Heavenly Kings	Gong Zhe for You and Me
2008	Chen Hwai-en for Island Etude	Tang Wei for Lust, Caution
2009	Zhang Meng for Lucky Dog	Chin-Yu Pan for Orz Boyz
2010	Ivy Ho for Claustrophobia	Sean Li for Permanent Residence
2011	Doze Niu for Monga	Lee Yi-chieh for When Love Comes
2012	Giddens Ko for You Are the Apple of My Eye	Kai Ko for You Are the Apple of My Eye
2013	Cheng Er for Lethal Hostage	Qi Xi for Mystery
2014	Hao Jie for The Love Songs Of Tiedan	Kuo Shu-yao for Step Back to Glory
2015	Cui Jian for Blue Sky Bones	Zhang Lei for Blind Massage
2016	Xin Yukun for The Coffin in the Mountain	Jessie Li for Port of Call
2017	Bi Gan for Kaili Blues	Shide Nyima for Tharlo
2018	Mei Feng for Mr. No Problem	Zhou Meijun for Angels Wear White
2019	Bai Xue for The Crossing	E Jingwen for The New King of Comedy

=== Popularity awards ===
Year	Most Popular Film	Most Popular Actor	Most Popular Actress
2002	Lan Yu	Hu Jun for Lan Yu	Gigi Leung for Roots and Branches
2003	Hero	Gold: Jiang Wen for The Missing Gun; Silver: Sun Haiying for Pretty Big Feet; Bronze: Geng Le for Spring Subway	Gold: Xu Jinglei for I Love You and Spring Subway; Silver: Lü Liping for Shanghai Women; Bronze: Liu Xuan for Far from Home
2004	Cell Phone	Gold: Ge You; Silver: Jiang Wen; Bronze: Liu Ye	Gold: Zhao Wei; Silver: Xu Jinglei; Bronze: Fan Bingbing
2015	—N/a	Julian Cheung for Triumph in the Skies	Charlene Choi for Sara

== Hong Kong/Taiwan region ==
=== Major awards ===
Year	Best Film	Best Director	Best Actor	Best Actress	Best Supporting Actor	Best Supporting Actress	Best Screenwriter	Best New Director
2002	Yi Yi	Edward Yang for Yi Yi	Hu Jun for Lan Yu	Anita Mui for July Rhapsody	—N/a	—N/a	—N/a	—N/a
2003	The Best of Times	Tso-chi Chang for The Best of Times	Anthony Wong for Princess D and Infernal Affairs	Angelica Lee for The Eye and Princess D	—N/a	—N/a	—N/a	Zheng Wentang for Somewhere Over The Dreamland
2004	Infernal Affairs II	Johnnie To for PTU	Andy Lau for Running on Karma	Cecilia Cheung for Lost in Time	Liu Kai-chi for Infernal Affairs II	Kara Hui for Night Corridor	Wai Ka-fai, Yau Nai-hoi, Au Kin-yee & Yip Tin-shing for Running on Karma	Lee Kang-sheng for The Missing

=== Popularity awards ===
Year	Most Popular Film	Most Popular Actor	Most Popular Actress
2003	—N/a	Gold: Andy Lau for Golden Chicken and Infernal Affairs; Silver: Tony Leung Chiu-wai for Hero and Infernal Affairs; Bronze: Leon Lai for Three	Gold: Cecilia Cheung for The Lion Roars; Silver: Maggie Cheung for Hero; Bronze: Twins for Summer Breeze of Love and Just One Look
2004	Infernal Affairs III	Gold: Tony Leung Chiu-wai; Silver: Andy Lau; Bronze: Anthony Wong	Gold: Cecilia Cheung; Silver: Charlene Choi; Bronze: Sandra Ng

== Most Anticipated awards ==
Year	Most Anticipated Film	Most Anticipated Actor	Most Anticipated Actress	Most Anticipated Performance
2011	Let the Bullets Fly	Huang Xiaoming for Sacrifice	Miriam Yeung for Love in a Puff	Fiona Sit for Break Up Club
2012	You Are the Apple of My Eye	Tong Dawei for The Flowers of War	Ni Ni for The Flowers of War	Michelle Chen for You Are the Apple of My Eye
2013	Lost in Thailand	Duan Yihong for White Deer Plain	Angelababy for First Time	Chen Bolin for Snowfall in Taipei
2014	Finding Mr. Right	Huang Bo for Journey to the West: Conquering the Demons	Yao Chen for Firestorm	Aarif Lee for One Night Surprise
2015	Brotherhood of Blades	Zheng Kai for Ex-Files	Zhou Dongyu for My Old Classmate	Ivana Wong for Golden Chicken 3
2016	Detective Chinatown	Oho Ou for The Left Ear	Liu Yifei for The Third Way of Love	Vivian Sung for Our Times
