= An Unfinished Film =

2024 film by Lou Ye

- International promotional poster
- Chinese: 一部未完成的电影
- Directed by: Lou Ye
- Written by: Lou Ye; Yingli Ma
- Produced by: Philippe Bober; Yingli Ma
- Starring: Qin Hao; Mao Xiaorui; Qi Xi
- Cinematography: Zeng Jian
- Edited by: Tian Jiaming
- Production companies: Yingfilms; Essential Films; ZDF/Arte; Cinema Inutile; Teamfun International; Gold Rush Pictures
- Release date: 16 May 2024 (Cannes)
- Running time: 106 minutes
- Countries: Singapore; Germany
- Language: Mandarin
- Box office: $69,135

An Unfinished Film (Chinese: 一部未完成的电影) is a 2024 docufiction film directed by Lou Ye, co-written with Yingli Ma. It stars Qin Hao, Mao Xiaorui, Qi Xi, Huang Xuan, and Liang Ming.

The film had its world premiere in the Special Screenings section of the 2024 Cannes Film Festival, on 16 May. It won both Best Narrative Feature and Best Director at the 61st Golden Horse Awards.

== Synopsis ==
In January 2020, a film crew reunites near Wuhan to resume the shooting of a film halted ten years earlier, only to share the unexpected challenges as cities are placed under lockdown.

== Cast ==
- Qin Hao as Jiang Cheng
- Mao Xiaorui as Director Xiaorui
- Qi Xi as Sang Qi
- Huang Xuan as Ye Xiao
- Liang Ming as Ah-Jian
- Zhang Songwen as Tang
- Youyou as Paopao

== Production ==
The film combines outtakes and behind-the-scenes footage from Lou's previous films—Suzhou River (2000), Spring Fever (2009), Mystery (2012), and The Shadow Play (2018)—and original footage of a film crew playing versions of themselves. It was originally conceived as a film consisting of old footage of Qin Hao playing various roles, which Lou felt "reflected the changes in China over the past decade or so", but as the COVID-19 pandemic began, it became a film centred on filmmaking during the pandemic.

As of May 2024, a separate film by Lou also consisting of footage from Spring Fever, Mystery, and The Shadow Play and new footage featuring Qin, Huang Xuan, Liang Ming, and Qi Xi was in production.

== Release ==
The film was nominated for the L'Œil d'or for best documentary at the 77th Cannes Film Festival, where it had its world premiere on 16 May 2024 in the Special Screenings section. It made its North American premiere at the 49th Toronto International Film Festival in the Centrepiece Programme. It was also selected for the MAMI Mumbai Film Festival 2024 under the World Cinema section. It was released theatrically in France on 23 October 2024.

== Reception ==
On the review aggregator website Rotten Tomatoes, 76% of 21 critics' reviews are positive, with an average rating of 7.8/10. Metacritic, which uses a weighted average, assigned the film a score of 78 out of 100, based on 9 critics, indicating "generally favorable" reviews.

== Accolades ==
Award	Year	Category	Recipient(s)	Result	Ref.
Cannes Film Festival	2024	L'Œil d'or	Lou Ye	Nominated	
Singapore International Film Festival	2024	Audience Choice Award	An Unfinished Film	Won	
Taipei Golden Horse Awards	2024	Best Narrative Feature	An Unfinished Film	Won	
Taipei Golden Horse Awards	2024	Best Director	Lou Ye	Won	
Taipei Golden Horse Awards	2024	Best Film Editing	Tian Jiaming	Nominated	
TOKYO FILMeX	2024	Audience Award	An Unfinished Film	Won	
