= 9th Asian Film Awards =

2015 edition of award ceremony

- Date: 25 March 2015
- Site: Macau

Highlights
- Best Film: Blind Massage
- Most awards: Gone with the Bullets (3)
- Most nominations: The Golden Era (5)

The 9th Asian Film Awards are the 2015 edition of the Asian Film Awards. The ceremony was held at the Venetian Theatre in The Venetian Casino and Hotel in Macau.

South Korean director Im Kwon-taek received the Lifetime Achievement Award, while Japanese actress Miki Nakatani received the Excellence in Asian Cinema Award.

This year marked the second time that the awards were organized by the Hong Kong International Film Festival, joined by the Busan and Tokyo film festivals through the Asian Film Awards (AFA) Academy.

== Awards jury ==
The jury for the 9th Asian Film Awards are:

- Mabel Cheung (Hong Kong, film producer and director and president of the jury)
- Aaron Kwok (Hong Kong, actor and singer)
- Ronald Arguelles (Philippines, head of Cinema One premium cable channel)
- John Badalu (Indonesia, festival delegate for Berlin and Shanghai International Film Festival)
- Alberto Barbera (Italy, director of National Museum of Cinema and Venice Film Festival)
- Tetsuya Bessho (Japan, actor and founder of Short Shorts Film Festival & Asia)
- Jeane Huang (Taiwan, director of the Taipei Film Festival)
- Huh Moonyung (South Korea, film critic for Cine 21)
- Kenji Ishizaka (Japan, programming director of the Tokyo International Film Festival)
- Christian Jeune (France, director of the film department of the Cannes Film Festival)
- Kim Ji-seok (South Korea, executive programmer of Busan International Film Festival)
- Li Cheuk-to (Hong Kong, artistic director of the Hong Kong International Film Festival)
- Li Shaohong (China, film director and chairwoman of China Film Directors' Guild)
- Clarence Tsui (Hong Kong, film critic for The Hollywood Reporter)

== Winners and nominees ==
Winners are listed first and highlighted in bold.

Best Film	Best Director
**Blind Massage** (China); Black Coal, Thin Ice (China); Haider (India); Hill of Freedom (South Korea); The Light Shines Only There (Japan); Ode to My Father (South Korea)	**Ann Hui – The Golden Era** (Hong Kong); Vishal Bhardwaj – Haider (India); Lav Diaz – From What Is Before (Philippines); Hong Sang-soo – Hill of Freedom (South Korea); Lou Ye – Blind Massage (China); Shinya Tsukamoto – Fires on the Plain (Japan)
Best Actor	Best Actress
**Liao Fan – Black Coal, Thin Ice** (China); Choi Min-sik – The Admiral: Roaring Currents (South Korea); Ryo Kase – Hill of Freedom (Japan); Sean Lau – Overheard 3 (Hong Kong); Ethan Ruan – Paradise in Service (Taiwan); Takeru Satoh – Rurouni Kenshin: The Legend Ends (Japan)	**Bae Doona – A Girl at My Door** (South Korea); Gong Li – Coming Home (China); Kalki Koechlin – Margarita With A Straw (India); Rie Miyazawa – Pale Moon (Japan); Tang Wei – The Golden Era (China); Zhao Wei – Dearest (China)
Best Supporting Actor	Best Supporting Actress
**Wang Zhiwen – The Golden Era** (China); Chen Jianbin – Paradise in Service (Taiwan); Cho Jin-woong – A Hard Day (South Korea); Hideaki Itō – Wood Job! (Japan); Qin Hao – Blind Massage (China)	**Chizuru Ikewaki – The Light Shines Only There** (Japan); Han Ye-ri – Haemoo (South Korea); Haru Kuroki – The Little House (Japan); Tabu – Haider (India); Wan Qian – Paradise in Service (Taiwan)
Best Newcomer	Best Screenwriter
**Zhang Huiwen – Coming Home** (China); Zhan Huai-yun – Meeting Dr. Sun (Taiwan); Do Kyung-soo – Cart (South Korea); Hiroomi Tosaka – Hot Road (Japan); Ivana Wong – Golden Chickensss (Hong Kong)	**Diao Yinan – Black Coal, Thin Ice** (China); Kim Seong-hun – A Hard Day (South Korea); Li Qiang – The Golden Era (China); Chaitanya Tamhane – Court (India); Ryo Takada – The Light Shines Only There (Japan)
Best Cinematographer	Best Production Designer
**Zeng Jian – Blind Massage** (China); Choi Chan-min – Kundo: Age of the Rampant (South Korea); Dong Jinsong – Black Coal, Thin Ice (China); Matt Flannery and Dimas Imam Subhono – The Raid 2 (Indonesia); Ryuto Kondo – My Man (Japan)	**Liu Qing – Gone with the Bullets** (China); Subrata Chakraborty and Amit Ray – Haider (India); Yuji Hayashida and Eri Sakushima – Over Your Dead Body (Japan); Park Il-hyun – Kundo: Age of the Rampant (South Korea); Yi Zhenzhou – The Taking of Tiger Mountain (China)
Best Composer	Best Editor
**Mikey McCleary – Margarita With A Straw** (India); BCDMG – Tokyo Tribes (Japan); Cui Jian and Liu Yuan – Blue Sky Bones (China); Mowg – The Fatal Encounter (South Korea); Zhang Yilin, Joe Hisaishi, Dou Peng, George Acogny and Shu Nan – Gone with the Bullets (China) / (Japan) / (United States)	**Gareth Evans – The Raid 2** (Indonesia); Kim Chang-ju – A Hard Day (South Korea); Kwong Chi-leung and Manda Wai – The Golden Era (China); Patrick Tam and Curran Pang – The Demon Within (Hong Kong); Hiroshi Sunaga – One Third (Japan)
Best Visual Effects	Best Costume Designer
**Rick Sanders and Christoph Zollinger – Gone with the Bullets** (United States); Kang Jong-ik – The Pirates (South Korea); Kim Wook – The Taking of Tiger Mountain – (South Korea); Takashi Yamazaki – Parasyte: Part 1 (Japan); Tong Ka-wai, Ken Law, Randy Tse and Lucky Tracy Hannah – The Midnight After (Hong Kong)	**William Chang – Gone with the Bullets** (Hong Kong); Isao Tsuge – Over Your Dead Body – (Japan); Jeong Gyeong-hee – The Fatal Encounter – (South Korea); Kwon Yu-jin – The Taking of Tiger Mountain (South Korea); Liang Tingting – Brotherhood of Blades (China)
Lifetime Achievement Award	Excellence in Asian Cinema Award
**Im Kwon-taek** (South Korea)	**Miki Nakatani** (Japan)
