= Love and Bruises =

- Film poster
- Directed by: Lou Ye
- Written by: Lou Ye; Jie Liu-Falin
- Produced by: Kristina Larsen; Pascal Caucheteux; Nai An
- Starring: Corinne Yam; Tahar Rahim
- Cinematography: Yu Lik Wai
- Edited by: Juliette Welfling
- Music by: Peyman Yazdanian
- Distributed by: Wild Bunch
- Release date: 1 September 2011 (Venice)
- Running time: 105 minutes
- Countries: China; France
- Languages: French; Mandarin

Love and Bruises is a 2011 French/Chinese drama film directed by Lou Ye. The film premiered at the 68th Venice International Film Festival.

== Plot ==
Adrift in Paris, Hua meets Mathieu. An intense, violent love affair begins. Hua tries to leave, unaware of the strength of her addiction.

== Cast ==
- Corinne Yam as Hua
- Tahar Rahim as Mathieu
- Jalil Lespert as Giovanni
- Vincent Rottiers as Eric
- Shao Sifan as Liang Bin
- Zhang Songwen as Ding Yi
- Patrick Mille as Thierry
- Adèle Ado as Nina, Mathieu's wife
