= Asian Film Award for Best Film =

Asian Film Awards

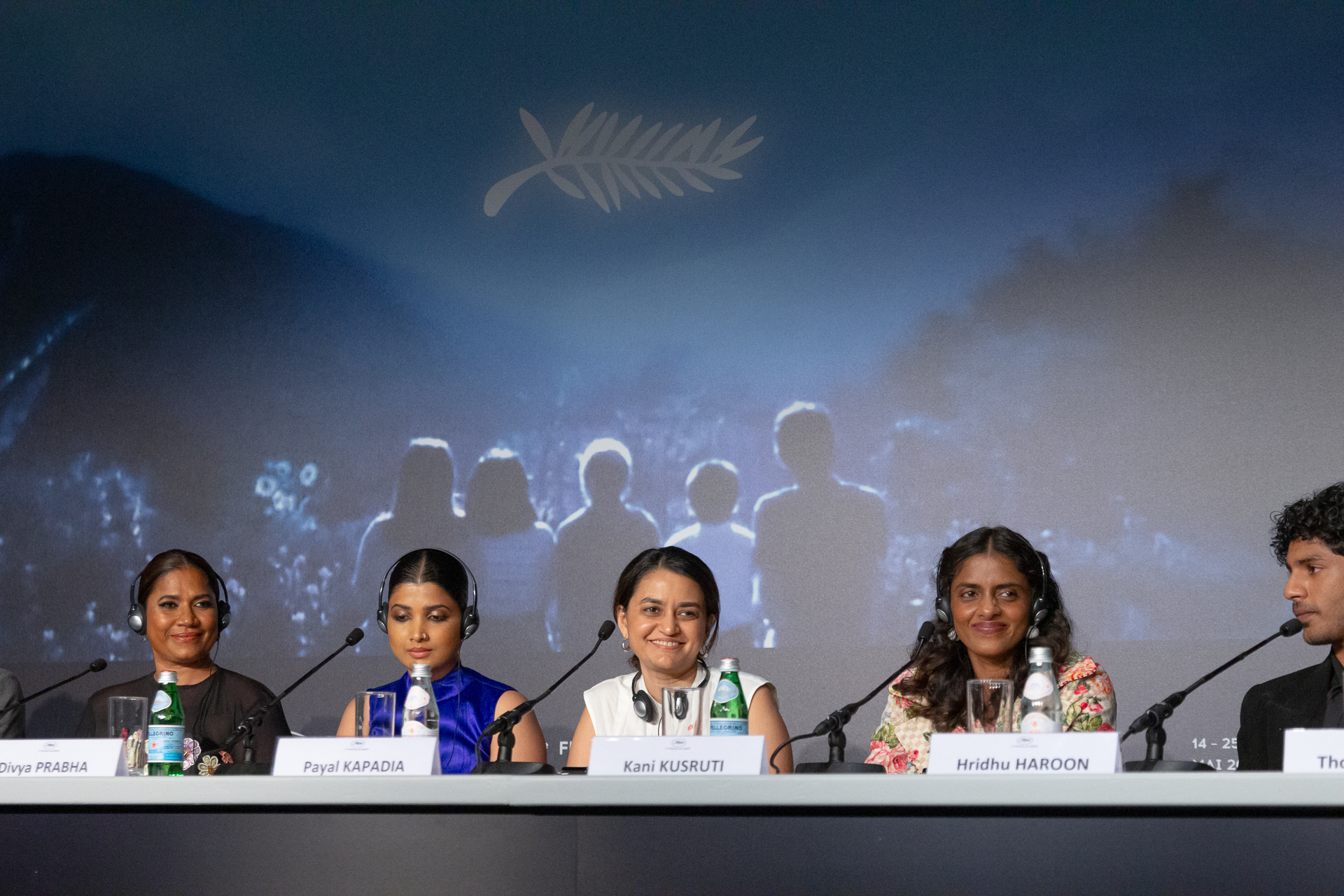
- The 2025 recipient: All We Imagine as Light
- Awarded for: Best Asian Film of the Year
- Presented by: Asian Film Awards Academy
- First award: 2007
- Most recent winner: All We Imagine as Light (2025)
- Website: afa-academy.com

Asian Film Award for Best Film is presented annually by the Asian Film Awards Academy (AFAA), a non-profit organization founded by Busan International Film Festival, Hong Kong International Film Festival and Tokyo International Film Festival with the shared goal of celebrating excellence in Asian cinema.

== History ==
It was first presented in 2007 during the first edition of the awards. South Korean monster film The Host, directed by Bong Joon Ho was the first recipient of the award. The most recent winner is All We Imagine as Light, an international co-production between India, France, Netherlands, and Luxembourg, directed by Payal Kapadia.

Japan and China both hold the record of most wins in the category, with five wins each, followed by South Korea with four and Hong Kong with two. Additionally, South Korean director Bong Joon Ho was the most award-winning films in the category with three of his film receiving the award: The Host (2007), Mother (2010) and Parasite (2020).

== Winners and nominees ==
=== 2000s ===
Year	English title	Original title	Director(s)	Country	Ref.
2007	The Host	괴물	Bong Joon-ho	South Korea	
2007	Curse of the Golden Flower	满城尽带黄金甲	Zhang Yimou	China; Hong Kong	
2007	Exiled	放·逐	Johnnie To	Hong Kong	
2007	Love and Honor	武士の一分	Yoji Yamada	Japan	
2007	Requiem from Java	Opera Jawa	Garin Nugroho	Indonesia	
2007	Still Life	三峡好人	Jia Zhangke	China	
2008	Secret Sunshine	밀양	Lee Chang-dong	South Korea	
2008	Buddha Collapsed Out of Shame	بودا از شرم فرو ریخت	Hana Makhmalbaf	Iran	
2008	I Just Didn't Do It	それでもボクはやってない	Masayuki Suo	Japan	
2008	Lust, Caution	色，戒	Ang Lee	Taiwan; China	
2008	The Sun Also Rises	太阳照常升起	Jiang Wen	China; Hong Kong	
2008	The Warlords	投名状	Peter Chan	China; Hong Kong	
2009	Tokyo Sonata	トウキョウソナタ	Kiyoshi Kurosawa	Japan	
2009	Forever Enthralled	梅兰芳	Chen Kaige	China	
2009	The Good, the Bad, the Weird	좋은 놈, 나쁜 놈, 이상한 놈	Kim Jee-woon	South Korea	
2009	Ponyo	崖の上のポニョ	Hayao Miyazaki	Japan	
2009	The Rainbow Troops	Laskar Pelangi	Riri Riza	Indonesia	
2009	Red Cliff	赤壁	John Woo	China	

=== 2010s ===
Year	English title	Original title	Director(s)	Country	Ref.
2010	Mother	마더	Bong Joon-ho	South Korea	
2010	Bodyguards and Assassins	十月圍城	Teddy Chan	Hong Kong	
2010	Cannot Live Without You	不能没有你	Leon Dai	Taiwan	
2010	City of Life and Death	南京! 南京!	Lu Chuan	China	
2010	Grandmother	Lola	Brillante Mendoza	Philippines	
2010	Parade	パレード	Isao Yukisada	Japan	
2011	Uncle Boonmee Who Can Recall His Past Lives	ลุงบุญมีระลึกชาติ	Apichatpong Weerasethakul	Thailand	
2011	Aftershock	唐山大地震	Feng Xiaogang	China	
2011	Confessions	告白	Tetsuya Nakashima	Japan	
2011	Let the Bullets Fly	让子弹飞	Jiang Wen	China; Hong Kong	
2011	Peepli Live	पीपली लाइव	Anusha Rizvi	India	
2011	Poetry	시	Lee Chang-dong	South Korea	
2012	A Separation	جدایی نادر از سیمین	Asghar Farhadi	Iran	
2012	The Flowers of War	金陵十三钗	Zhang Yimou	China	
2012	Flying Swords of Dragon Gate	龍門飛甲	Tsui Hark	China; Hong Kong	
2012	Postcard	一枚のハガキ	Kaneto Shindo	Japan	
2012	Seediq Bale	賽德克·巴萊	Wei Te-sheng	Taiwan	
2012	You Don't Live Twice	Zindagi Na Milegi Dobara	Zoya Akhtar	India	
2013	Mystery	浮城谜事	Lou Ye	China	
2013	Drug War	毒戰	Johnnie To	China; Hong Kong	
2013	Gangs of Wasseypur – Part 1 & 2	गैंग्स ऑफ़ वासेपुर-भाग	Anurag Kashyap	India	
2013	Outrage Beyond	アウトレイジ ビヨンド	Takeshi Kitano	Japan	
2013	Pietà	피에타	Kim Ki-duk	South Korea	
2014	The Grandmaster	一代宗師	Wong Kar-wai	Hong Kong; China	
2014	The Great Passage	舟を編む	Yuya Ishii	Japan	
2014	The Lunchbox	द लंच बॉक्स	Ritesh Batra	India	
2014	No Man's Land	无人区	Ning Hao	China	
2014	Snowpiercer	설국열차	Bong Joon-ho	South Korea	
2014	Stray Dogs	郊遊	Tsai Ming-liang	Taiwan; France	
2015	Blind Massage	推拿	Lou Ye	China	
2015	Black Coal, Thin Ice	白日焰火	Diao Yinan	China	
2015	Haider	हैदर	Vishal Bhardwaj	India	
2015	Hill of Freedom	자유의 언덕	Hong Sang-soo	South Korea	
2015	Ode to My Father	국제시장	Yoon Je-kyoon	South Korea	
2015	The Light Shines Only There	そこのみにて光輝く	Mipo O	Japan	
2016	The Assassin	刺客聶隱娘	Hou Hsiao-hsien	Taiwan; China; Hong Kong	
2016	Bajirao Mastani	बाजीराव मस्तानी	Sanjay Leela Bhansali	India	
2016	Mountains May Depart	山河故人	Jia Zhangke	China; France; Japan	
2016	Mr. Six	老炮儿	Guan Hu	China	
2016	Three Stories of Love	恋人たち	Ryōsuke Hashiguchi	Japan	
2016	Veteran	베테랑	Ryoo Seung-wan	South Korea	
2017	I Am Not Madame Bovary	我不是潘金莲	Feng Xiaogang	China	
2017	The Age of Shadows	밀정	Kim Jee-woon	South Korea	
2017	Godspeed	一路順風	Chung Mong-hong	Taiwan	
2017	Harmonium	淵に立つ	Kōji Fukada	Japan	
2017	The Wailing	곡성	Na Hong-jin	South Korea	
2018	Youth	芳华	Feng Xiaogang	China	
2018	Angels Wear White	嘉年华	Vivian Qu	China; France	
2018	The Day After	그 후	Hong Sang-soo	South Korea	
2018	Newton	न्यूटन	Amit V Masurkar	India	
2018	The Third Murder	三度目の殺人	Hirokazu Kore-eda	Japan	
2019	Shoplifters	万引き家族	Hirokazu Kore-eda	Japan	
2019	Burning	버닝	Lee Chang-dong	South Korea	
2019	Dying to Survive	我不是藥神	Wen Muye	China	
2019	Jinpa	撞死了一只羊	Pema Tseden	China	
2019	Sanju		Rajkumar Hirani	India	

=== 2020s ===
Year	English title	Original title	Director(s)	Country	Ref.
2020	Parasite	기생충	Bong Joon-ho	South Korea	
2020	Listen to the Universe	蜜蜂と遠雷	Kei Ishikawa	Japan	
2020	So Long, My Son	地久天长	Wang Xiaoshuai	China	
2020	A Sun	陽光普照	Chung Mong-hong	Taiwan	
2020	Thappad		Anubhav Sinha	India	
2020	There Is No Evil	شیطان وجود ندارد	Mohammad Rasoulof	Iran	
2021	Wife of a Spy	スパイの妻	Kiyoshi Kurosawa	Japan	
2021	Wheel of Fortune and Fantasy	偶然と想像	Ryusuke Hamaguchi	Japan	
2021	The Disciple		Chaitanya Tamhane	India	
2021	The Book of Fish	자산어보	Lee Joon-ik	South Korea	
2021	One Second	一秒钟	Zhang Yimou	China	
2023	Drive My Car	ドライブ・マイ・カー	Ryusuke Hamaguchi	Japan	
2023	Decision to Leave	헤어질 결심	Park Chan-wook	South Korea	
2023	Ponniyin Selvan: I	பொன்னியின் செல்வன்	Mani Ratnam	India	
2023	When the Waves Are Gone	Kapag Wala Nang Mga Alon	Lav Diaz	Philippines	
2023	Poet	Akyn	Darezhan Omirbaev	Kazakhstan	
2024	Evil Does Not Exist	悪は存在しない	Ryusuke Hamaguchi	Japan	
2024	12.12: The Day	서울의 봄	Kim Sung-su	South Korea	
2024	Paradise		Prasanna Vithanage	Sri Lanka; India	
2024	Perfect Days		Wim Wenders	Japan; Germany	
2024	Snow Leopard	雪豹	Pema Tseden	China	
2025	All We Imagine as Light		Payal Kapadia	India; France; Netherlands; Luxembourg	
2025	Exhuma	파묘	Jang Jae-hyun	South Korea	
2025	Teki Cometh	敵	Daihachi Yoshida	Japan	
2025	Black Dog	狗阵	Guan Hu	China	
2025	Twilight of the Warriors: Walled In	九龍城寨之圍城	Soi Cheang	Hong Kong	
