= 7th Asian Film Awards =

2013 edition of award ceremony

- Date: 18 March 2013
- Site: Hong Kong Convention and Exhibition Center

Highlights
- Best Film: Mystery
- Most awards: Mystery (3), Rhino Season (3)
- Most nominations: Nameless Gangster: Rules of the Time, Mystery (6)

The 7th Asian Film Awards took place on 18 March 2013. In the 14 award categories, 30 films with 70 nominees from across Asia were recognized for their excellence in cinema. The nominees were announced by actor Andy Lau who also served as president of the judging panel. The ceremony was held at the Grand Hall of the Hong Kong Convention and Exhibition Center.

Michelle Yeoh received the honour of the Lifetime Achievement award.

== Jury ==
- Andy Lau (Hong Kong)
- Ronald Arguelles (Philippines)
- John Badalu (Indonesia)
- Patricia Cheng (Hong Kong)
- Kenji Ishizaka (Japan)
- Christian Jeune (France)
- Dai Jinhua (China)
- Eric Khoo (Singapore)
- Kong Rithdee (Thailand)
- Wen Tien-hsiang (Taiwan)
- Jacob Wong (Hong Kong)

== Winners and nominees ==
Winners are listed first and highlighted in bold.

Best Film	Best Director
**Mystery** (China); Drug War (China) / (Hong Kong); Gangs of Wasseypur – Part 1 & 2 (India); Outrage Beyond (Japan); Pietà (South Korea)	**Takeshi Kitano – Outrage Beyond** (Japan); Anurag Kashyap – Gangs of Wasseypur – Part 1 & 2 (India); Abbas Kiarostami – Like Someone in Love (Japan) / (France) / (Iran); Kim Ki-duk – Pietà (South Korea); Lou Ye – Mystery (China)
Best Actor	Best Actress
**Eddie Garcia – Bwakaw** (Philippines); Joseph Chang – Girlfriend, Boyfriend (Taiwan); Choi Min-sik – Nameless Gangster: Rules of the Time (South Korea); Tony Leung Ka-fai – Cold War (Hong Kong); Liu Ye – The Last Supper (China)	**Nora Aunor – Thy Womb** (Philippines); Cho Min-soo – Pietà (South Korea); Golshifteh Farahani – The Patience Stone (Afghanistan); Gwei Lun-mei – Girlfriend, Boyfriend (Taiwan); Hao Lei – Mystery (China)
Best Supporting Actor	Best Supporting Actress
**Nawazuddin Siddiqui – Talaash: The Answer Lies Within** (India); Ha Jung-woo – Nameless Gangster: Rules of the Time (South Korea); Ryo Kase – Like Someone in Love (Japan); Chapman To – Diva (Hong Kong); Rhydian Vaughan – Girlfriend, Boyfriend (Taiwan)	**Makiko Watanabe – Capturing Dad** (Japan); Jun Ji-hyun – The Thieves (South Korea); Kim Hye-soo – The Thieves (South Korea); Lee Lieh – Together (Taiwan); Qin Lan – The Last Supper (China)
Best Newcomer	Best Screenwriter
**Qi Xi – Mystery** (China); Jian Man-shu – When a Wolf Falls in Love with a Sheep (Taiwan); Higashide Masahiro – The Kirishima Thing (Japan); Huang Yu-siang – Touch of the Light (Taiwan); Kim Sung-kyun – Nameless Gangster: Rules of the Time (South Korea)	**Mei Feng, Yu Fan & Lou Ye – Mystery** (China); Anand Gandhi – Ship of Theseus (India); Kōhei Kiyasu & Yoshida Daihachi – The Kirishima Thing (Japan); Wai Ka-fai, Yau Nai-hoi, Ryker Chan & Yu Xi – Drug War (China) / (Hong Kong); Yoon Jong-bin – Nameless Gangster: Rules of the Time (South Korea)
Best Cinematographer	Best Production Designer
**Touraj Aslani – Rhino Season** (Kurdistan Region) / (Iraq); Choi Young-hwan – The Thieves (South Korea); Rajeev Ravi – Gangs of Wasseypur – Part 1 & 2 (India); Yanagijima Katsumi – Like Someone in Love (Japan); Zhang Li & Ma Cheng – The Last Supper (China)	**Bahman Ghobadi & Ali Daryai – Rhino Season** (Kurdistan Region) / (Iraq); Cho Hwa-sung – Nameless Gangster: Rules of the Time (South Korea); Wasiq Khan – Gangs of Wasseypur – Part 1 & 2 (India); Man Lim-Chung – The Silent War – (China) / (Hong Kong); Yee Chung-man & Eric Lam Chi-ki – The Last Tycoon (China) / (Hong Kong)
Best Composer	Best Editor
**Pritam Chakraborty – Barfi! (India)**; Jo Yeong-wook – Nameless Gangster: Rules of the Time (South Korea); Peyman Yazdanian & Jóhann Jóhannsson – Mystery (China); Keiichi Suzuki – Outrage Beyond (Japan); Ueno Koji – The Floating Castle (Japan)	**Kusakabe Mototaka – The Kirishima Thing** (Japan); Takeshi Kitano & Ohta Yoshinori – Outrage Beyond (Japan); Valerie Loiseleux – Rhino Season (Kurdistan Region) / (Iraq); David Richardson & Allen Leung – Drug War (China) / (Hong Kong); Shin Min-kyung – The Thieves (South Korea)
Best Visual Effects	Best Costume Designer
**Farbod Khoshtinat – Rhino Season** (Kurdistan Region) / (Iraq); Chas Chau, Lewis Chan, Benson Poon & Johnny Lin – When a Wolf Falls in Love with a Sheep (Taiwan); Kwak Tae-yong, Hwang Hyo-kyun, Lim Jung-hoon – Doomsday Book (South Korea); Lee In-ho, Je Young-ho – Soar into the Sun (South Korea); Onoue Katsuro, Oya Tetsuo, Sato Atsuki & Tsujino Minami – The Floating Castle (Japan)	**Man Lim-chung – The Silent War** (China) / (Hong Kong); Chen Xue-bing & Zhong Jia-ni – The Last Supper (China); Jessie Dai Mei-ling & Chan Chi-man – The Last Tycoon (China) / (Hong Kong); Kwak Jung-ae – A Werewolf Boy (South Korea); Otsuka Mitsuru, Matsunaga Kazuta & Inamura Akihiko – The Floating Castle (Japan)

=== People's Choice Awards ===
Favorite Actor	Favorite Actress
**Eddie Garcia – Bwakaw** (Philippines); Joseph Chang – Girlfriend, Boyfriend (Taiwan); Choi Min-sik – Nameless Gangster: Rules of the Time (South Korea); Tony Leung Ka-fai – Cold War (Hong Kong); Liu Ye – The Last Supper (China)	**Cho Min-soo – Pietà** (South Korea); Nora Aunor – Thy Womb (Philippines); Golshifteh Farahani – The Patience Stone (Afghanistan); Gwei Lun-mei – Girlfriend, Boyfriend (Taiwan); Hao Lei – Mystery (China)

=== Special awards ===
Excellence in Asian Cinema Award

- Michelle Yeoh (Malaysia)

The Asian Film Award for 2012’s Top Grossing Asian Film

- Lost in Thailand (China)
