= Riverside Code at Qingming Festival =

- Promotional poster
- Simplified Chinese: 清明上河图密码
- Traditional Chinese: 清明上河圖密碼
- Hanyu Pinyin: Qīngmíng Shànghé Tú Mìmǎ
- Genre: Historical; Mystery; Thriller
- Based on: Riverside Code at Qingming Festival by Ye Wenbiao
- Written by: Wang Qinan
- Directed by: Yang Fan; Xiong Chen
- Starring: Zhang Songwen; Bai Baihe
- Country of origin: China
- Original language: Mandarin
- No. of seasons: 1
- No. of episodes: 26

Production
- Executive producers: Ma Jun; Zhang Yuanhuan; Zhang Xiaozhou
- Production locations: Zhouzhuang, Kunshan, Jiangsu
- Production companies: China Central Television; Youku; Alibaba Pictures; Suzhou Juyou Xiangfa Film and Television Culture Communication Co., Ltd. Gongfu Pictures; Gongfu Xiaoxi Pictures

Original release
- Network: CCTV-8; Youku
- Release: 16 December – 27 December 2024

Riverside Code at Qingming Festival (Chinese: 清明上河图密码) is a 2024 Chinese historical suspense television series directed by Yang Fan and Xiong Chen, written by Wang Qinan, and starring Zhang Songwen and Bai Baihe. Set during the Northern Song dynasty (960–1127), the series follows the story of the Zhao family in Bianliang city. It was first broadcast on 16 December 2024 in CCTV-8 and Youku in China.

== Cast ==
=== Main ===
- Zhang Songwen as Zhao Buyou (赵不尤), an official in Dalisi.
  - Ling Zhuo as Zhao Buyou (young)
- Bai Baihe as Wen Yue (温悦), wife of Zhao Buyou.
  - Wang He as Wen Yue (young)

=== Supporting ===
- Zhou Yiwei as Gu Zhen (顾震), an official in Kaifeng Prefecture
- Hou Yansong as Zhao Li (赵离)
- Zhang Yao as Zhao Mo'er (赵墨儿)
- Xia Meng as Zhao Ban'er (赵瓣儿)
- Lin Jiachuan as Wan Fu (万福)
- Shi An as Zhang Zeduan, a prominent painter of the Northern Song dynasty.
- Hao Fushen as Song Qiyu (宋齐愈)
- Hao Han as Yao He (姚禾)
- Li Naiwen as Di Lun (狄伦)
- Hai Yitian as Xiao Yishui (萧逸水)
- Zhang Xinyu as Zhang Qiniang (章七娘)
- Jiang Peiyao as Chi Liaoliao (池了了)
- You Jingru as Wang Yunchang (王云裳)
- Cheng Mo as Wang Yueyue (汪月月)
- Wang Peilu as Gan Liang (甘亮)
- Zhang Tianyang as Zhang Mei (章美)
- Mo Xiaoqi as Fei Xiang'e (费香娥)
- Song Chuyan as Luan Hui (栾回)
- Lin Peng as Zou Ziyin (邹紫茵)
- Lu Yanqi as Chun Xi (春熙)
- Wang Duo as Luo Zhun (罗准)
- Ren Yunjie as He Huan (何欢)
- Li Yinan as Sun Bo (孙勃)
- Jian Kang as Shan Shiliu (单十六)
- Li Bin as Kang Qian (康浅)
- Jing Ming as Wu Ao (武翱)
- Yao Tong as Wu Qiao (武翘)
- Yin Yuanzhang as Ding Dalang (丁大郎)
- Tan Jianchang as Jian Zhuang (简庄)
- Liu Enshang as Zheng Dun (郑敦)
- Ding Ningjia as Zou Yongjin (邹雍进)
- Qi Le as Zhuang Qiang (庄强)
- Ren Luomin as Magistrate Wang (王府尹)
- Ding Ran as Wu Mei'er (乌眉儿)
- Jin Qiu as Lu Sanzhen (陆三贞)
- Jampa Tseten as Dong Qian (董谦)
- Zhang Chunnian as Tao Yaban (陶押班)
- Zhang Shaorong as Zou Mian (邹勉)
- Yang Zihua as Li Ding (李鼎)
- Li Shuting as A Ci (阿慈)
- Dang Tao as Xie Laoba (谢老八)
- Zhu Weiwei as Madame Lan (蓝大娘)
- Li Shu as Butcher Chu (朱屠户)
- Mao Le as Mr. Li (李先生)
- Qiao Hua as Xiao Wanzi (小弯子)
- Guan Enyu as Xiao Guanzi (小管子)
- Zhang Huizi as Xiao Shiliu (小石榴)
- Wang Hui Hua as Tie Chi (铁尺)
- Guo Xiang as Fei Jian (飞剑)
- Wan Yuhan as Xiao Xi (小蟋)
- Yang Yunran as Fei Xiao'e (费小娥)
- Li Zhimo as Su Qin (素琴)
- Dongli Wuyou as Xiao Yi (小乙)
- Qin Yue as Granny Li (李婆子)
- Ju Jinzhan as Shopkeeper (掌柜)
- Kang Chuyan as Fu Ling (茯苓)
- Zhang Hui as Li Yan (李言)
- Liu Xingyu as Li Yan's wife (李言妻子)
- Sun Jian as Sixth Uncle Chen (陈六叔)
- Wang Lili as Aunt Chen (陈嫂)
- Zhong Ming as Su Zhi (苏直)
- Yuan Wenli as Madame Su He (苏何氏)
- Hu Yuying as Peng Ying'er (彭影儿)
- Wang Jing as Peng Zui'er (彭嘴儿)
- Xue Ben as A Feng (阿丰)
- Xue Ningbin as Chen Ya'nei (陈衙内)
- Wei Wenbing as Shopkeeper Qin (秦掌柜)
- Wang Xiaolong as Steward Liu (刘总管)
- Leng Haiming as new housekeeper (新管家)
- Dai Yue as Leng Xiang (冷缃)
- Ji Huai as Housekeeper Liu (刘管家)
- Xu Chao as Minister Cao (曹侍郎)
- Bi Hanwen as Minister Ma (马少卿)
- Zhu Guowei as Lao Yan (老阎)
- Liu Yulong as Xue Hai (薛海)
- Yu Qinghui as Chen Baoshan (陈保山)

== Soundtrack ==
No.	Title	Lyrics	Music	Singer(s)	Length
1.	"Golden Age (盛世)" (Ending theme)	Wang Haitao	Han Hong	Han Hong
2.	"The Dream Song (大梦歌)" (Ending theme)	Meng Nan & Qu Shicong	Qu Shicong	Chen Lijun
3.	"Qing River Painting Boat (清河画船)" (Ending theme)	Qu Shicong	Qu Shicong	Meng Nan & Zhang Shidi
4.	"Only Wish (唯愿)" (Interlude)	Han Hong	Han Hong	Bai Baihe
5.	"Song and Music (歌与乐)" (Interlude)	Su Shi	Lu Cheng	Ma Xinrui
6.	"In the World (在人间)" (Interlude)	Yang Fan	Zhao Liangqi	Zhao Liangqi

== Production ==
The series is based on Riverside Code at Qingming Festival by Ye Wenbiao. Principal photography started on 19 October 2023 and wrapped on 30 January 2024.
