= The Lonely Warrior =

Chinese television series, 2023–2024

- Genre: Mystery, Crime
- Inspired by: Deep Blue "Please tell the Director, the mission of Brigade Three has been completed"
- Written by: Xing Jianjun, Li Sifu
- Directed by: Xing Jianjun
- Starring: Qin Hao, Li Naiwen, Chen Minghao, Ma Yinyin
- Country of origin: China
- Original language: Mandarin
- No. of episodes: 24

Production
- Executive producer: Wang Xiaohui
- Producer: Dai Ying
- Production companies: IQIYI; Wanda TV series; Dongyang New Media Eslite; Chengya Film and Television

Original release
- Network: iQIYI
- Release: 21 December 2023 – 4 January 2024

The Lonely Warrior (Chinese: 三大队) is a 2023 crime suspense online drama in mainland China, adapted from the short documentary work "Please tell the Director, the mission of Brigade Three has been completed" by writer Shen Lan. The series is directed by Xing JianJun, written by Xing JianJun and Li Sifu, starring Qin Hao, Li Naiwen, Chen Minghao, and Ma Yinyin, with Tong Liya and Ren Min as special guest stars. It will be broadcast on iQiyi Mist Theater (迷雾剧场) on December 21, 2023.

== Synopsis ==
After an interrogation gone wrong, Detective Cheng Bing (played by Qin Hao) from the Third Brigade was imprisoned and served his sentence. His teammates were implicated, dismissed from the police force, and demoted, leading to the disbandment of the former Third Brigade. After spending ten years in prison, Cheng Bing regained his freedom, but his faith was shattered, his passion extinguished, and he lost everything. Meanwhile, the suspect in the case, Wang Dayong, remained at large. However, wearing a police uniform for just a day instilled in Cheng Bing a sense of righteousness that would last a lifetime. The Third Brigade felt compelled to explain their actions, but their unwillingness morphed into determination, and they once again unsheathed the sharp blade of justice. Cheng Bing and his brothers from the Third Brigade regrouped and embarked on a journey to pursue the murderer. Throughout the lonely and arduous pursuit, they collaborated with law enforcement, chasing the murderer across thousands of miles. After 13 years and eight city-wide searches, Wang Dayong was finally apprehended and brought to justice. Through this ascetic journey, Cheng Bing rediscovered the coordinates and meaning of life.

== Cast ==
actor	Role	Introduction
Qin Hao	ChengBing	Captain of the third team, sentenced to 10 years in prison in a trial, became a police officer again after being released from prison
Li Naiwen	Pan Dahai	Captain of the second team
Chen Minghao	Wang Dayong	fugitive suspect
Ma Yinyin	Lin Ying	Members of the third team
Lin Jiachuan	Cai Bin	Members of the third team
Fan Lei	Lao Ma	Members of the third team
Li Xiaochuan	Liao Jian	Members of the third team
Yin Zhixuan	Xiao XU	Members of the third team
Liu Yitie	Shi Tou	Members of the third team
Yang Xinming	Qi Shu	Master of the criminal police team
Tong Liya	Liu Wenfang	Cheng Bing's wife
Ren Min	Wang Miaomiao	Wang Eryong's daughter

== Production ==
In March 2022, Xing Jianjun decided to create the TV series "The Lonely Warrior", and script discussions began. By December 2022, the basic script was completed, and as the filming progressed from preparation to start, the script was continuously revised and polished. The TV series "The Lonely Warrior" is adapted from Shenlan's work "Please tell the Director, the mission of Brigade Three has been completed". This prototype story provides a valuable first draft outline, and the series cleverly retained it during the adaptation process. The core content not only shows the charm of the original story, but also adds more details and plot development through in-depth expansion, making the story richer. The creative team interviewed many veteran police officers and detectives. Their experiences and inner and emotional changes in the face of different incidents have become one of the sources of authenticity in the creation of "Three Brigades".

Xing Jianjun, the screenwriter and director of the TV series "The Lonely Warrior", started to contact Qin Hao after writing 5 episodes of the script. After that, he never wanted to find other actors and kept communicating with him. Because he has a sense of reality, from his performance to his own state, it is very consistent. The TV series "The Lonely Warrior" was filmed in Xiamen, Northeast China, Yunnan and other places.

The TV series "The Lonely Warrior" restores the background of the era more than 20 years ago, and the creative team planted many "Easter eggs". One of the characteristics of this drama is "nostalgia". The drama shows common props such as mobile phones and BP machines (pagers) at the end of the 20th century. The creative team of the TV series "The Lonely Warrior" spent a lot of time in early stage exchanges, interviews, and visits. They obtained first-hand real materials from more than 20 front-line criminal police officers and police station directors, and invited these police officers to come to the scene to guide the filming.

== Promotion and release ==
On September 21, 2023, the TV series "The Lonely Warrior" unveiled its stills and officially announced the lineup. The show also released its first trailer on the same day. Later, on December 18, the show released storytelling stills. Subsequently, on December 20, the series released stills featuring "Old Faces." The following day, December 21, a finalized poster was released, announcing its premiere at 19:00 on the same day at the iQiyi Mist Theater (迷雾剧场). Also on December 21, a special episode featuring the protagonist Cheng Bing was released. Additionally, on the same day, the show released a drama calendar, followed by the release of the drama "Life" poster on December 22.

== Analysis ==
Throughout the story of the TV series "The Lonely Warrior", the theme of "Justice may be late, but it will never be absent" resonates. The Three Brigades, with their persistence and sense of justice, safeguarded the hearts of the people, allowing the audience to experience the reality of life and its profound background. Through the struggles and sacrifices of the characters, the audience deeply grasps that the pursuit of justice is the most precious aspect of life.

The TV series "The Lonely Warrior" no longer focuses solely on the novelty of the case but shifts the narrative's focus to the changes in the characters' fates. It utilizes the characters' life trajectories and beliefs to resonate with the audience on a deeper level. "The Lonely Warrior", as a new work of iQiyi Mist Theater, embodies the theater's innovative ideas in the suspense drama genre. The creators aim for the drama to embody the creative concept of "emphasizing fate lines, focusing more on plot than emotion", imbuing it with a more humanistic spirit.

== Soundtrack ==
"The Lonely Warrior" TV series original soundtrack
No.	Title	Lyrics	Music	singer	Length
1.	"《少年壮志不言愁》"	Lin Ruwei	Leilei	Qin Hao
2.	"《真心英雄》"	Li Zongsheng	Li Zongsheng	Qin Hao, Fan Lei, Lin Jiachuan, Li Xiaochuan, Liu Yitie, Yin Zhixuan, Liu Nan, Lin Xiaofan, Li Jin, She Liang
3.	"《九妹》"	Huang Hexiang	Huang Hexiang	She Liang
4.	"《微芒》"	Zhou Jieying	Hu Xiaoou	Jiang Kunwei

== Broadcast time ==
Channel/Platform	Broadcast time	remark
IQIYI	December 21, 2023 – January 4, 2024	3 episodes will be updated on the first day of broadcast for VIP members, 1 episode will be updated from Monday to Wednesday and January 4, and 2 episodes will be updated from Thursday to Sunday. Non-member update 1 episode
China DragonTV	December 25, 2023 - January 5, 2024	Afternoon session, 2 episodes broadcast in a row
China DragonTV	January 3, 2024 - January 26, 2024	In the evening, 2 episodes will be broadcast in a row

== Reception ==
People's Daily commented that the drama version of The Lonely Warrior "embodies that even though the members of the criminal police team have lost their professional status, they have never lost their firm performance of their duties, their persistent pursuit of justice, and their dedication at all costs."

China Police Network said "the TV series is unique. In the story, the protagonist Cheng Bing, played by Qin Hao, was imprisoned and lost his police identity because of an accident during the interrogation that caused the death of a suspect. After being released from prison, he remained true to his original intention and was determined to pursue the murderer. As a professional policeman, while chasing the drama, I couldn't help but empathize with this group of characters. While watching the drama, I acted as "their" staff assistant, thinking about how to investigate in a roundabout way and find shortcuts. In the fourteenth episode, Cheng Bing's thoughts are meticulous and his methods are effective. He is worthy of the title of a good policeman "in and out of the drama". More importantly, the whole drama shows a kind of abundant, high-spirited and unyielding spirit."

Wenhui Daily comment that although Wanda is responsible for both the movie and web drama adaptations of The Lonely Warrior, the storyline of the drama version has caused controversy due to over-stretching and cutting compared to the movie version. The major differences between the drama version and the movie version are that firstly, the escaped Wang Eryong in the prototype and movie version were changed to his brother Wang Dayong, and secondly, the timeline of events related to the Third Brigade and the Wang brothers were moved forward. In this regard, Xing Jianjun, the screenwriter and director of the drama, said that although the film and drama versions communicate with each other, they are not content-oriented, but emotional. The scripts of the film and online drama are independent, emphasizing that "giving the transparent story another dimension rationality".

== Awards ==
years	Awards ceremony	Awards	finalists	result
2024	2024 Capital TV Program Spring Program Forum& Market	Quality drama of the year	The Lonely Warrior	Won
