= Qin Hao =

Chinese actor

- Born: 19 May 1978 (age 48); Shenyang, Liaoning, China
- Education: Central Academy of Drama
- Occupation: Actor
- Years active: 2005–present
- Spouse: Annie Yi (m. 2015)

Qin Hao (Chinese name: Chinese: 秦昊; pinyin: Qín Hào) is a Chinese actor. He is known for starring in the 2009 film Spring Fever, and for his roles in suspense crime dramas Burning Ice (2017), The Bad Kids (2020) and The Long Season (2023).

== Early life ==
In 1996, Qin entered China's Central Academy of Drama. He graduated from the Central Academy of Drama in 2000.

== Career ==
Qin landed his first lead role in Lou Ye's Spring Fever, which was shown in competition at the 62nd Cannes Film Festival where it won the prize for best screenplay.

He started gaining mainstream recognition for his role in the 2020 iQiyi crime drama The Bad Kids. In 2023, he starred in the critically-acclaimed murder mystery drama The Long Season.

== Personal life ==
He married the famous singer Annie Yi, and they have a daughter named Cindy (b.2016).

== Filmography ==
=== Film ===
| Year | English title | Chinese title | Role | Notes |
|---|---|---|---|---|
| 2000 | | 防守反擊 | Feng Xiaoguo | |
| 2005 | Shanghai Dreams | 青紅 | Lu Jun | |
| 2006 | After This Our Exile | 父子 | School bus driver | |
| 2009 | Irreversi | 回路 | David Du | Cameo |
| 2009 | Spring Fever | 春风沉醉的夜晚 | Jiang Cheng | |
| 2010 | Chongqing Blues | 日照重庆 | Xiao Hao | |
| 2011 | The First President | 第一大总统 | Zhang Ji | |
| 2011 | The Flowers of War | 金陵十三釵 | Soldier | |
| 2012 | Tokyo Newcomer | 初到东京 | Jie Liu | |
| 2012 | The Next Miracle | 下一个奇迹 | Liang Haien / Rocky | |
| 2012 | The Zodiac Mystery | 十二星座離奇事件 | Zhao Pin | |
| 2012 | Mystery | 浮城谜事 | Qiao Yongzhao | |
| 2012 | Promise Time | 玩命時光 | Guo Wen | |
| 2013 | The Nightingale | 夜莺 | Chongyi | |
| 2014 | Forever Young | 怒放之青春再見 | Zheng Tianliang | |
| 2014 | Blind Massage | 推拿 | Sha Fuming | |
| 2014 | But Always | 一生一世 | Michael | |
| 2014 | Red Amnesia | 闯入者 | Zhang Bing | |
| 2015 | The Queens | 我是女王 | Zhang Yi | |
| 2015 | Rock Hero | 摇滚英雄 | Wu Li | |
| 2015 | Another Woman | 234說愛你 | Li Yao | |
| 2016 | Crosscurrent | 长江图 | Gao Chun | |
| 2016 | Spicy Hot in Love | 爱情麻辣烫之情定终身 | Li Xiaoying | |
| 2016 | Chongqing Hot Pot | 火锅英雄 | Xu Dong | |
| 2017 | Lord of Shanghai | 上海王 | Huang Peiyu | |
| 2017 | Legend of the Demon Cat | 妖猫传 | Chen Yunqiao | |
| 2017 | Namiya | 解忧杂货店 | Hao Bo | |
| 2018 | Charlie IX & Dodomo | 墨多多谜境冒险 | Lao Mo | |
| 2018 | Last Letter | 你好，之华 | Yin Chuan | |
| 2019 | The Hero | 这位壮士 | | |
| 2019 | The Shadow Play | 风中有朵雨做的云 | Song Zicheng | |
| 2021 | The Pioneer | 革命者 | Chen Duxiu | |

=== Television series ===
| Year | English title | Chinese title | Role | Notes |
|---|---|---|---|---|
| 2002 | | 闽南名流世家 | Zheng Jiajun | |
| 2003 | | 小康之家 | Wu Feng | |
| 2004 | Spring in Summer | 夏日里的春天 | Qi Feng | |
| 2007 | Crime Reporter | 举报人 | Sun Ruzhi | |
| 2012 | Refresh 3+7 | 刷新3+7 | Shen Dong | |
| 2014 | Sound of the Desert | 風中奇緣 | Hu Liwei | |
| 2016 | City Lover | 城市恋人 | Ding Yufeng | |
| 2017 | Burning Ice | 无证之罪 | Yan Liang | |
| 2018 | Strategy | 兵临棋下 | Jiang Hua | |
| 2018 | The Tomb of Sea | 沙海 | Wu Xie | |
| 2018 | The Great River | 江河水 | Jiang He | |
| 2018 | | 誓言 | Xiao Siyu | |
| 2020 | The Bad Kids | 隐秘的角落 | Zhang Dongsheng | |
| 2020 | The Song of Glory | 南歌 | Liu Yikang | |
| 2020 | Young Army Officers | 尉官正年轻 | Meng Yonggan | |
| 2021 | Hunter | 猎狼者 | Wei Jiang | |
| 2022 | Game of Wisdom | 大博弈 | Sun Heping | |
| 2022 | Left Right | 亲爱的小孩 | Xiao Lu | |
| 2023 | The Long Season | 漫长的季节 | Gong Biao | |
| 2023 | The Lonely Warrior | 三大队 | Cheng Bing | |
| 2023 | As Long As We Are Together | 小满生活 | Ye Yifan | |

== Awards ==
| Year | Award | Category | Nominated work | Result | Ref. |
|---|---|---|---|---|---|
| 2010 | 47th Golden Horse Awards | Best Leading Actor | Spring Fever | Nominated | |
| 2011 | 11th Chinese Film Media Awards | Best Actor | Spring Fever | Nominated | |
| 2015 | 15th Chinese Film Media Awards | Best Actor | Blind Massage | Won | |
| 2015 | 22nd Beijing College Student Film Festival | Best Actor | Blind Massage | Won | |
| 2015 | 6th China Film Director's Guild Awards | Best Actor | Blind Massage | Nominated | |
| 2015 | 9th Asian Film Awards | Best Supporting Actor | Blind Massage | Nominated | |
| 2016 | 1st Gold Aries Awards | Best Actor | Blind Massage | Won | |
| 2020 | Forbes China | China Celebrity 100 | —N/a | 87th | |
| 2020 | 16th Chinese American Film Festival | Best Leading Actor | The Bad Kids | Won | |
| 2020 | 29th Huading Awards | Best Actor in a Television Series | The Bad Kids | Nominated | |
| 2020 | 29th Huading Awards | Audience's Favorite TV Actor | The Bad Kids | Won | |
| 2020 | iQIYI Scream Night | Actor of The Year | The Bad Kids | Won | |
| 2020 | 2020 Sohu Fashion Awards | National Drama Male Star of the Year | The Bad Kids | Won | |
| 2020 | 3rd Sir Movie Cultural And Entertainment Industry Awards | Best Leading Actor in a Television Series | The Bad Kids | Won | |
| 2020 | 7th The Actors of China Award | Best Performance by an Actor-Internet Drama | The Bad Kids | Nominated | |
| 2020 | Man At His Best Award | Mr. Of The Year | —N/a | Won | |
| 2020 | 2020 IFeng Fashion Choice Awards | Fashion Influential Person of the year | —N/a | Won | |
| 2020 | 2020 IFeng Film and TV Awards | Best Actor in a Television Series | The Bad Kids | Nominated | |
| 2021 | 2021 Douyin Star Motion Night | Actor of The Year | The Bad Kids | Won | |
| 2024 | 32nd China TV Golden Eagle Awards | Best Supporting Actor | The Long Season | Nominated | |
