= Zhang Songwen =

Chinese actor (born 1976)

- 张颂文
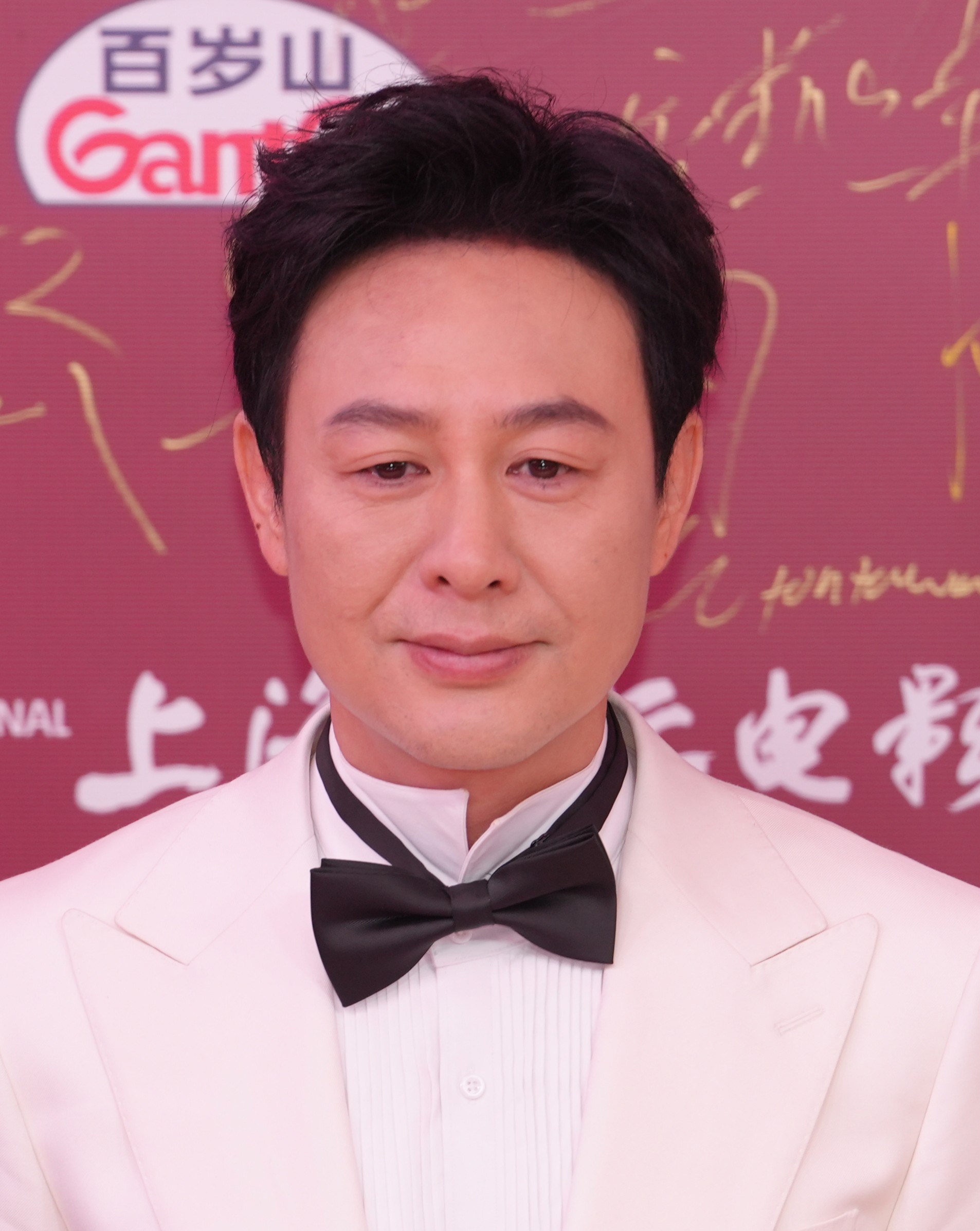
- Zhang at 2026 Shanghai International Film Festival
- Born: 10 May 1976 (age 50); Shaoguan, Guangdong, China
- Other name: Steven Zhang
- Education: Beijing Film Academy
- Occupations: Actor; acting coach
- Years active: 2003–present
- Agent: Mountaintop Entertainment
- Children: 1

Chinese name
- Simplified Chinese: 张颂文
- Traditional Chinese: 張頌文
Transcriptions
Standard Mandarin
- Hanyu Pinyin: Zhāng SòngWén

Zhang Songwen (simplified Chinese: 张颂文; traditional Chinese: 張頌文; pinyin: Zhāng Sòngwén; born 10 May 1976) is a Chinese actor and acting coach. After gaining local recognition for his role in the Cantonese sitcom Cheng Long Guai Xu (Season 1) (2005), he struggled as an actor and mainly worked as an acting coach until his breakout success in the television series The Knockout (2023). His other notable credits include Lou Ye's films The Shadow Play (2018), Saturday Fiction (2019), and An Unfinished Film (2024), and television series The Bad Kids (2020), A Lonely Hero's Journey (2024) and Riverside Code at Qingming Festival (2024).

== Early life ==
Zhang Songwen was born in Shaoguan, Guangdong, on 10 May 1976. His father was a veteran, while his mother was a doctor. After graduating from Shaoguan Vocational High School, he held various jobs, including working at a printing factory, a food stall, and a beverage factory. From 1994 to 1999, he was employed as a tour guide with the China Travel Service. At the age of 24, Zhang first heard about Beijing Film Academy through a fellow tour guide and on the same day, he quit his job and moved to Beijing. He enrolled in the vocational class of the Performance Department at the Beijing Film Academy, where he served as class monitor and student union president. A few years after graduation from the vocational class, he was admitted into the BFA's vocational-to-bachelor's program. After graduation, he worked as a teaching assistant at the academy for eight years.

== Career ==
Zhang has worked as an acting coach for films and TV series, including the first season of the Cantonese sitcom Cheng Long Guai Xu (2005), where he also played his first leading role, and the film Love on Credit (2011), where he coached the leading actress Lin Chi-ling.

In 2008, Zhang left his teaching position at Beijing Film Academy to establish his own acting studio.

In 2009, Zhang collaborated with director Lou Ye for the first time in Spring Fever (2009). Zhang later starred in the director's The Shadow Play (2018), Saturday Fiction (2019), and An Unfinished Film (2024), all of which received critical acclaim.

In 2017, Zhang appeared in End of Summer (2017), which won the KNN Award at the 22nd Busan International Film Festival.

In 2020, Zhang appeared in the web series The Bad Kids, based on the Zi Jinchen's novel, Bad Kid (坏小孩).

In 2023, Zhang achieved breakout success for his role as a fishmonger-turned-crime-boss in the TV series The Knockout (2023). He followed with Chen Kaige's Korean War film The Volunteers: To the War (2023) and Jonathan Li's crime film Dust to Dust (2023), and starred in four TV series within one year of 2024.

== Controversy ==
=== Allegations of domestic violence ===
On December 30, 2024, former actress Jiang Chen heavily suggested that Zhang committed domestic violence and infidelity during their relationship, which had begun when she took acting lessons from him thirteen years ago. On January 5, 2025, Jiang confirmed Zhang as the subject of her allegations by releasing a recorded phone call with Li Zifeng, the producer of the film The Sun Rises on Us All, in which Zhang stars. During the call, Jiang rejected the producer's offer of hush money. Li refuted the recording, accusing Jiang of maliciously editing it.

=== Allegations of tax evasion ===
On January 2, 2025, a paparazzi outlet claimed that Zhang had been questioned by China's tax authorities over suspected tax evasion. On January 7, the China Radio and Television Association Actors Committee stated that online rumors concerning "a well-known actor" contained "large amounts of false information" and that "tax matters should be based on official announcements by the relevant authorities," which was interpreted as an official endorsement for Zhang.

== Filmography ==
=== Film ===
Year	English title	Chinese title	Role	Notes/Ref.
2009	Spring Fever	春风沉醉的夜晚	Han Ming	
2011	The First President	第一大总统	Ye Ju	
2012	Love Lifting	高舉·愛	Chen Chao	
2012	Guns and Roses	黄金大劫案	Pu Xiaotong	
2012	The Four	四大名捕	Qian Jian	
2012	The Last Tycoon	大上海	Bao Yunlong	
2013	Ip Man: The Final Fight	葉問：終極一戰	Ip Chun	
2013	Fake Fiction	摩登年代	Wei Jian	
2014	Red Amnesia	闯入者	Policeman	
2015	An Inspector Calls	神探駕到	Qi Shixing	
2015	The Way Forward	一路向前	Dr. Li	
2017	End of Summer	西小河的夏天	Gu Jianhua	
2019	The Shadow Play	风中有朵雨做的云	Tang Yijie	
2019	Saturday Fiction	兰心大剧院	Ni Zeren	
2020	The Best Is Yet to Come	不止不休	Huang Jiang	
2021	The Pioneer	革命者	Li Dazhao	
2023	The Volunteers: To the War	志愿军：雄兵出击	Wu Xiuquan	
2023	Dust to Dust	第八个嫌疑人	He Lan	

=== Television series ===
Year	English title	Chinese title	Role	Notes	Ref.
2005	Cheng Long Guai Xu (Season 1)	乘龙怪婿	Jia Fa	Also as acting coach	
2006	Empress Feng of the Northern Wei Dynasty	北魏冯太后	Wang Hui		
2008	Huo Yuanjia	霍元甲	Nong Jinsun		
2009	Bing Sheng	兵圣	Fuchai of Wu		
2010	The Legend of Yang Guifei	杨贵妃秘史	Yang Guozhong		
2015	Master of Destiny	風雲天地	young Kuang Junhao		
2018	The Inquiry in 1938	密查	Sun Dawu		
2020	Detective Chinatown	唐人街探案	Wensong		
2020	The Bad Kids	隐秘的角落	Zhu Yongping	IQIYI web show	
2021	Medal of the Republic	功勋	Li Tingzhao		
2022	Life is A Long Quiet River	心居	Zhan Xiang	IQIYI web show	
2023	The Knockout	狂飙	Gao Qiqiang		
2024	The Boy Who Couldn't See a Shadow	看不见影子的少年	Wang Shitu	IQIYI web show	
2024	The Hunter	猎冰	Huang Zongwei	Tencent Video web show. The role is based on Liu Zhaohua.	
2024	A Lonely Hero's Journey	孤舟	Zhou Zhifei	The role is based on Huang Yizhai.	
2024	Riverside Code at Qingming Festival	清明上河图密码	Zhao Buyou	Youku web show	

== Literary works ==
- Match Heaven (Reader: All Love) (《火柴天堂》（《读者：全是爱》）)
- The Person who Lights the Lamp in the Heart (Tianya) (《在心里点灯的人》（《天涯》）)
