= Mystery (2012 film) =

2012 film by Lou Ye

- International poster
- Directed by: Lou Ye
- Written by: Yu Fan; Mei Feng; Lou Ye
- Produced by: Kristina Larsen
- Starring: Hao Lei; Qin Hao; Qi Xi
- Cinematography: Zeng Jian
- Edited by: Simon Jacquet
- Music by: Jóhann Jóhannsson
- Production companies: Dream Author Pictures; Les Films du Lendemain; Arte France Cinéma
- Release date: 18 May 2012 (Cannes)
- Running time: 98 minutes
- Countries: China; France
- Language: Mandarin

Mystery (浮城謎事) is a 2012 Chinese drama film directed by Lou Ye. This is Lou Ye's seventh film but only the second (with Purple Butterfly in 2003) to have been released in his own country. The story is based on a series of posts under the title of "This Is How I Punish A Cheating Man And His Mistress" (《看我如何收拾贱男与小三》), which has over one million hits. "Mystery is beautiful and violent, both in the emotions it deals with and the scenes that display them. It echoes some of contemporary China's own problems, such as corruption, money, ambiguity and morality," says Brice Pedroletti in his review on The Guardian.

The film competed in the Un Certain Regard section at the 2012 Cannes Film Festival. At the 7th Asian Film Awards, the film won the Asian Film Award for Best Film.

== Plot ==
Lu Jie has no idea her husband Yongzhao is leading a double life, until the day she sees him entering a hotel with a young woman. Her world crumbles – and it is just the beginning.

== Cast ==
- Hao Lei as Lu Jie - Qiao Yongzhao's wife, and they have one daughter.
- Qin Hao as Qiao Yongzhao - The male protagonist.
- Qi Xi as Sang Qi/Sang Hailan - Qiao Yongzhao's mistress, and they have a son.
