= The Shadow Play (2018 film) =

A Rain Cloud in the Sky (The Shadow Play)
- Poster
- Chinese: 风中有朵雨做的云
- Directed by: Lou Ye
- Screenplay by: Mei Feng; Qiu Yujie; Ma Jingli
- Produced by: Chang Chia-lu; Lou Ye; Nai An; Xu Le
- Starring: Jing Boran; Ma Sichun; Qin Hao; Song Jia; Michelle Chen
- Cinematography: Jake Pollock
- Edited by: Zhu Lin
- Music by: Jóhann Jóhannsson; Jonas Colstrup
- Production companies: Beijing Enlight Pictures; Khorgos Youth Enlight Pictures; Tianjin Cat Eye Micro Shadow Culture Media; Croton Media Group; Haining Hankun Film and Television Media; Shanghai Qianyi Zhicheng Culture Media; Hangzhou Xindingming Film and Television Investment Management
- Distributed by: Beijing Enlight Media
- Release dates: 9 November 2018 (Taipei Golden Horse Film Festival); 4 April 2019 (China)
- Running time: 129 minutes
- Country: China
- Languages: Standard Mandarin Chinese; Cantonese
- Box office: US$9,626,679

The Shadow Play (Chinese: 风中有朵雨做的云; lit. 'There's cloud made from rain in the wind') is a 2018 Chinese crime drama film directed by Lou Ye. It made its world premiere at the 58th Taipei Golden Horse Film Festival in 2018. The film was also shown in the Panorama section at the 69th Berlin International Film Festival. It was released theatrically on April 4, 2019 in China.

== Synopsis ==
Yang Jiadong, a naive rookie cop, witnesses the Chief of Construction Committee jumping to his death from a tall building. He immediately begins investigation, but is brutally dismissed from his job and pursued by unknown enemies. He escapes to Hong Kong, where meets the daughter of the deceased victim. With her help, Yang Jiadong continues to seek for the truth, but finds himself falling into a trap of love.

== Cast ==
- Jing Boran as Yang Jiadong
- Ma Sichun as Xiao Ruo
  - Sun Chenxi as Xiao Ruo (10-year-old)
  - Huang Kailu as Xiao Ruo (15-year-old)
- Song Jia as Lin Hui
- Qin Hao as Jiang Zicheng
- Michelle Chen as Lian Ahyun
- Zhang Songwen as Tang Yijie
- Edison Chen as Alex
- Cherry Ngan as bar girl
- Wang Weishen as Wang
- Shan Baozhong as Sun
- Leung Chi-lik as Chun
- Chen Weirong as Mr. Yang
- Luo Yimin as Stuntman
- Hu Ling as Ms Hu
- Herman Lau as Businessman

== Awards and nominations ==
Award	Category	Recipients	Result
55th Golden Horse Awards	Best Director	Lou Ye	Nominated
55th Golden Horse Awards	Best Cinematography	Jake Pollock	Nominated
55th Golden Horse Awards	Best Action Choreography	Bruce Law and Norman Law	Nominated
55th Golden Horse Awards	Best Sound Effects	Fu Kang	Nominated
69th Berlin International Film Festival	CICAE Award - Panorama	Lou Ye	Nominated
69th Berlin International Film Festival	Panorama Audience Award for Fiction Film	Lou Ye	Nominated
19th Chinese Film Media Awards	Best Film	The Shadow Play	Won
19th Chinese Film Media Awards	Best Director	Lou Ye	Nominated
19th Chinese Film Media Awards	Best Actress	Song Jia	Won
19th Chinese Film Media Awards	Best Supporting Actor	Zhang Songwen	Won
11th China Film Director's Guild Awards	Best Director	Lou Ye	Nominated
11th China Film Director's Guild Awards	Best Actress	Song Jia	Nominated
11th China Film Director's Guild Awards	Best Supporting Actor	Zhang Songwen	Nominated
1st Academy Award of Beijing Film Academy	Best Director	Lou Ye	Nominated
1st Academy Award of Beijing Film Academy	Best Screenplay	Ma Yingli, Qiu Yujie, Mei Feng	Nominated
