= Purple Butterfly =

- Theatrical poster for American release
- Directed by: Lou Ye
- Written by: Lou Ye
- Produced by: Lou Ye; Wang Wei; Zhu Yongde
- Starring: Zhang Ziyi; Liu Ye; Tōru Nakamura; Feng Yuanzheng; Li Bingbing
- Cinematography: Wang Yu
- Edited by: Lou Ye; Che Xiaohong
- Music by: Jörg Lemberg
- Distributed by: Palm Pictures
- Release dates: 22 May 2003 (Cannes); 25 July 2003 (China)
- Running time: 127 minutes
- Country: China
- Languages: Mandarin; Japanese

Purple Butterfly (Chinese: 紫蝴蝶; pinyin: Zǐ Húdié) is a 2003 Chinese historical drama film directed by Lou Ye. It is Lou's third film after Weekend Lover and Suzhou River. It stars Chinese actors, Zhang Ziyi, Liu Ye and Li Bingbing, as well as Japanese actor Tōru Nakamura. The film premiered on May 23, 2003, at the 2003 Cannes Film Festival, and was given a limited release in New York City the following year on November 26, 2004.

The film was only released in one theater in the United States (in New York City) for three weeks, where it grossed $17,790.

== Plot ==
In 1928 Manchuria, Japanese translator Hidehiko Itami leaves his Chinese lover Ding Hui and returns to Tokyo. Several years later, when he arrives in Shanghai, he has become a spy. Meanwhile, Ding Hui witnesses her brother, who ran an anti-Japanese newspaper, being assassinated by the Japanese. She later goes to Shanghai, joins an underground resistance organization against the Japanese occupation named Purple Butterfly, and falls in love with its leader Xie Ming.

The resistance group hires an assassin from out of town to kill a Japanese intelligence officer named Yamamoto. At a train station, a highly accidental mistake leads to a low-level clerk named Szeto, who happens to be sitting across from the real assassin on the train, being mistaken for him. Members of the resistance approach Szeto and hand him materials about the assassination target. His confused reaction causes chaos. During the ensuing gunfight, Ding Hui accidentally kills Szeto's girlfriend, Yiling, who had come to meet him.

After receiving the materials, Szeto is captured by Yamamoto's subordinate, Itami. Under brutal torture, Szeto remains completely unaware of what is going on. From an informant within the resistance, Itami learns that Szeto is just an unlucky bystander who got dragged into the situation by mistake, and he releases him. However, the resistance believes that Szeto has turned traitor after being released and decides to eliminate him.

Szeto goes from being an outsider to someone deeply entangled in chaos, facing threats from both the Japanese secret police and the resistance, yet unable to explain himself to either side. Meanwhile, Itami encounters his former lover Ding Hui again, and Szeto witnesses their meeting, which further confuses him about everything happening around him. Consumed by the desire to avenge Yiling, he has no clear target for his revenge.

With the real assassin gone, the resistance must carry out the plan to kill Yamamoto themselves. Ding Hui, caught between her former lover Itami and her current lover Xie Ming, who stand on opposing sides. becomes a crucial pawn in both camps' schemes. Burdened by guilt over killing an innocent person, she too becomes lost and conflicted.

Ding Hui accompanies Itami to a gathering at a Japanese club, where they embrace and dance together. Itami tells her that Yamamoto will not be coming, and neither will Xie Ming as he is already dead. Shocked, Ding Hui stabs Itami. At that moment, Szeto bursts into the ballroom, shoots and kills Itami, and then turns his gun toward Ding Hui.

== Cast ==
- Zhang Ziyi as Cynthia / Ding Hui
- Liu Ye as Szeto
- Tōru Nakamura as Hidehiko Itami
- Feng Yuanzheng as Xie Ming
- Li Bingbing as Tang Yiling
- Lan Yan as A Zi
- Kin Ei as Yamamoto

== Reception ==
With the success of Lou's previous film, Suzhou River (2000), Purple Butterfly was an anticipated follow up with a considerably larger budget. The film received polarizing receptions. Rotten Tomatoes records a 45% "rotten" rating. Metacritic records the film received a 68 score out of 100, meaning "generally favorable reviews".

G. Allen Johnson of the San Francisco Chronicle describes the film as "a gorgeously shot, ambitious epic". Kevin Thomas of the Los Angeles Times called the film, "a remarkable period piece, evoking the bustling, dense and increasingly dangerous Shanghai of the '30s". Thomas praised Zhang as an actress with "formidable resources" and "has that crucial gift of holding herself in check at just the right moments for maximum dramatic impact and psychological complexity". Thomas further state the film is "suspenseful, atmospheric and sometimes puzzling".

However, other critics saw the film as technically masterful but a case where style had trumped substance. In particular the film's labyrinthine and difficult to follow plot was pointed to as a major point of complaint. One such review by Sean Axmaker of the Seattle Post-Intelligencer called the film "lush but confusing", and states "Purple Butterfly is rich with emotional turmoil and searing beauty, but it could have used a little more time in the editing room to make sense of it all."
