= Spring Fever (2009 film) =

2009 Hong Kong-French film by Lou Ye

- Taiwan poster (the film however was never allowed to publicly screen in Taiwan)
- Traditional Chinese: 春風沉醉的夜晚
- Simplified Chinese: 春风沉醉的夜晚
- Literal meaning: The Night Deeply Drunk on the Spring Breeze
- Hanyu Pinyin: Chūnfēng Chénzuì de Yèwǎn
- Directed by: Lou Ye
- Written by: Mei Feng
- Produced by: Lou Ye; Nai An; Sylvain Bursztejn
- Starring: Qin Hao; Chen Sicheng; Tan Zhuo; Wu Wei; Jiang Jiaqi
- Cinematography: Zeng Jian
- Edited by: Robin Weng; Zeng Jian; Florence Bresson
- Music by: Peyman Yazdanian
- Production companies: Dream Factory HK; Rosem Films
- Distributed by: Le Pacte
- Release date: May 13, 2009 (Cannes)
- Running time: 116 minutes
- Countries: Hong Kong; France
- Language: Mandarin

Spring Fever (simplified Chinese: 春风沉醉的夜晚; traditional Chinese: 春風沉醉的夜晚; pinyin: Chūnfēng Chénzuì de Yèwǎn) is a 2009 film directed by Lou Ye. A Hong Kong-French co-production, the film's creation was in defiance of a five-year ban on filmmaking imposed on Ye by China's State Administration of Radio, Film, and Television (SARFT) for his previous film, Summer Palace. Filmed in Nanjing, the film was described to be about a young threesome overcome with erotic longings.

By the time of the film's premiere at the Cannes Festival on 13 May 2009, it was known that Lou had circumvented the five-year ban imposed upon him after Summer Palace by having Spring Fever registered as a Hong Kong/French co-production.

== Plot ==
The story begins in Nanjing. Suspecting that her husband Wang Ping is cheating on her, Lin Xue hires an unemployed photographer named Luo Haitao to follow him. Indeed, Wang is having a steamy affair with Jiang Cheng, a gay man. Lin confronts Wang and storms into Jiang's office to make a scene. Jiang cuts off all contact with Wang. Jiang becomes depressed and sleeps with Luo. Luo actually has a girlfriend, Li Jing, who loves him.

Wang becomes desperate and commits suicide. Meanwhile, Li's factory is shut down by the police. As her boss has been good to her, Li helps to secure his release from detention, but comes to the realization he just wants to get into her pants.

Jiang is devastated after hearing Wang's suicide. He quits his job and plans to go to Suqian with Luo for some materials. However, Li tags along and discovers their relationship. She is very upset, but as she really loves Luo, decides to "share" him with Jiang.

On their way back to Nanjing, it becomes clear the dysfunctional love triangle cannot be sustained. Li leaves first, and Luo and Jiang also break up with some tears shed. Jiang is ambushed by a vengeful Lin and almost killed. He recovers and begins a relationship with another gay man.

== Cast ==
- Qin Hao (Chinese: 秦昊) as Jiang Cheng (Chinese: 江诚)
- Chen Sicheng (Chinese: 陈思成) as Luo Haitao (Chinese: 罗海涛)
- Tan Zhuo (Chinese: 谭卓) as Li Jing (Chinese: 李静)
- Wu Wei (Chinese: 吴伟) as Wang Ping (Chinese: 王平)
- Jiang Jiaqi (Chinese: 江佳奇) as Lin Xue (Chinese: 林雪)
- Huang Xuan

== Release ==
In April 2009, it was announced that Spring Fever was to be shown in competition at the 2009 Cannes Film Festival. Little else was known about the film at the time, except that Lou was in the process of editing the film in Paris. Like Summer Palace, Spring Fever was also screened without government approval.

== Reception ==
An early review by industry watcher Variety, following Spring Fever's premiere in the 2009 Cannes Film Festival, was critical of the film's "overlong" running-length of 116 minutes, and its overly "Euro tastes (and Western sensibilities)," especially when compared with Lou's breakout film Suzhou River.

The film won the award for Best Screenplay at the 2009 Cannes Film Festival for its writer Mei Feng.
