= Cannes Film Festival Award for Best Screenplay =

Film award category

Best Screenplay Award
- Prix du scénario (French)
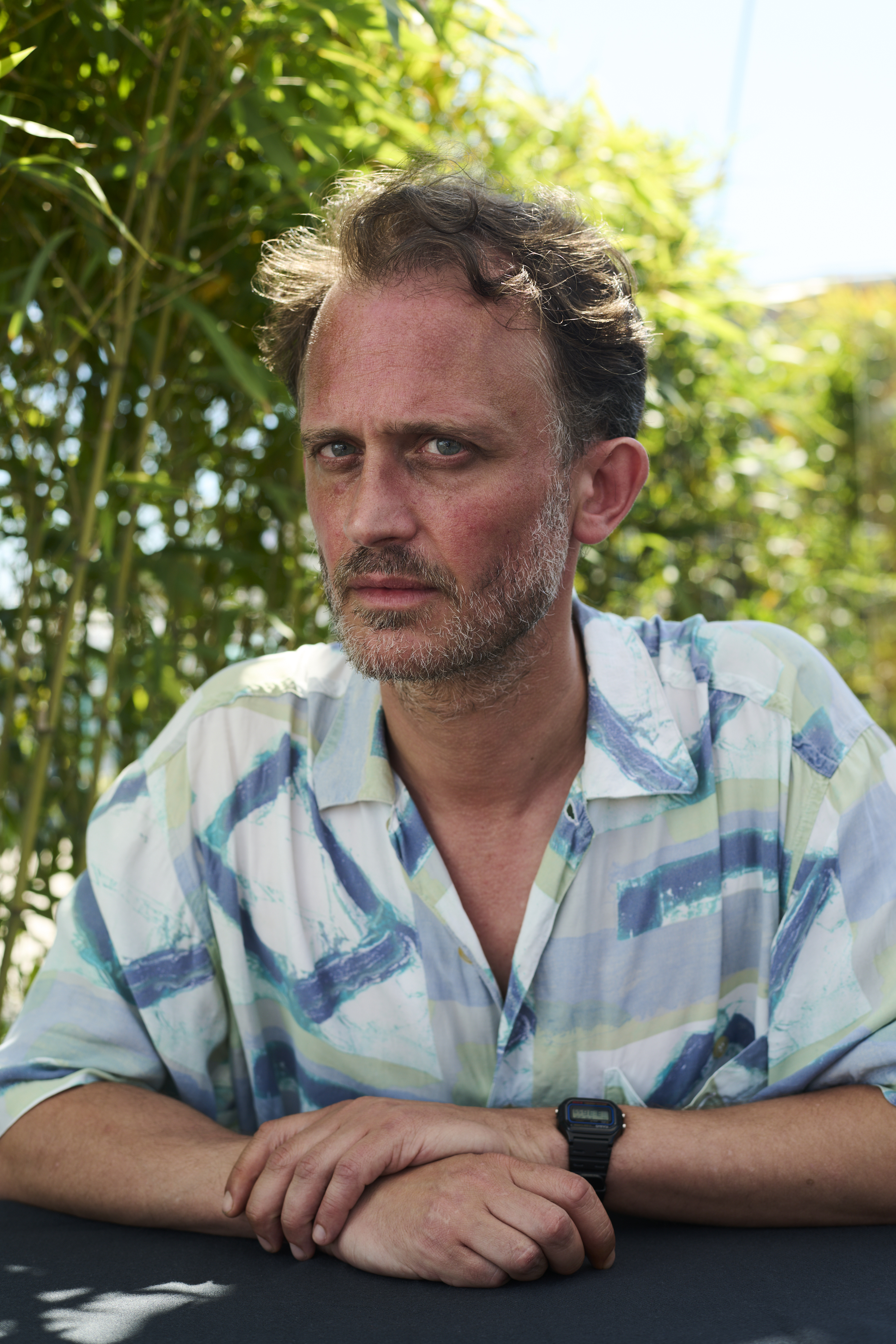
- 2026 recipient: Emmanuel Marre
- Awarded for: Best Achievement in Writing
- Country: France
- Presented by: Cannes Film Festival
- First award: 1949
- Currently held by: Emmanuel Marre for A Man of His Time (2026)
- Website: www.festival-cannes.com/en/

The Best Screenplay Award (French: Prix du scénario) is an award presented by the Jury to the best screenwriter for their work on a film of the Official Selection of the Cannes Film Festival.

Its most recent winner was French filmmaker Emmanuel Marre for A Man of His Time (2026), at the 79th Cannes Film Festival.

== History ==
It was first awarded to Alfred L. Werker, Eugene Ling & Virginia Shaler for Lost Boundaries (1949).

Winners Denys Arcand for The Barbarian Invasions (2003), Ryusuke Hamaguchi & Takamasa Oe for Drive My Car (2021) and Coralie Fargeat for The Substance (2024) were later nominated Academy Awards for their screenplays.

Jean-Pierre and Luc Dardenne are the only filmmakers who won twice, for Lorna's Silence (2008) and Young Mothers (2025).

== Winners ==
Official logo

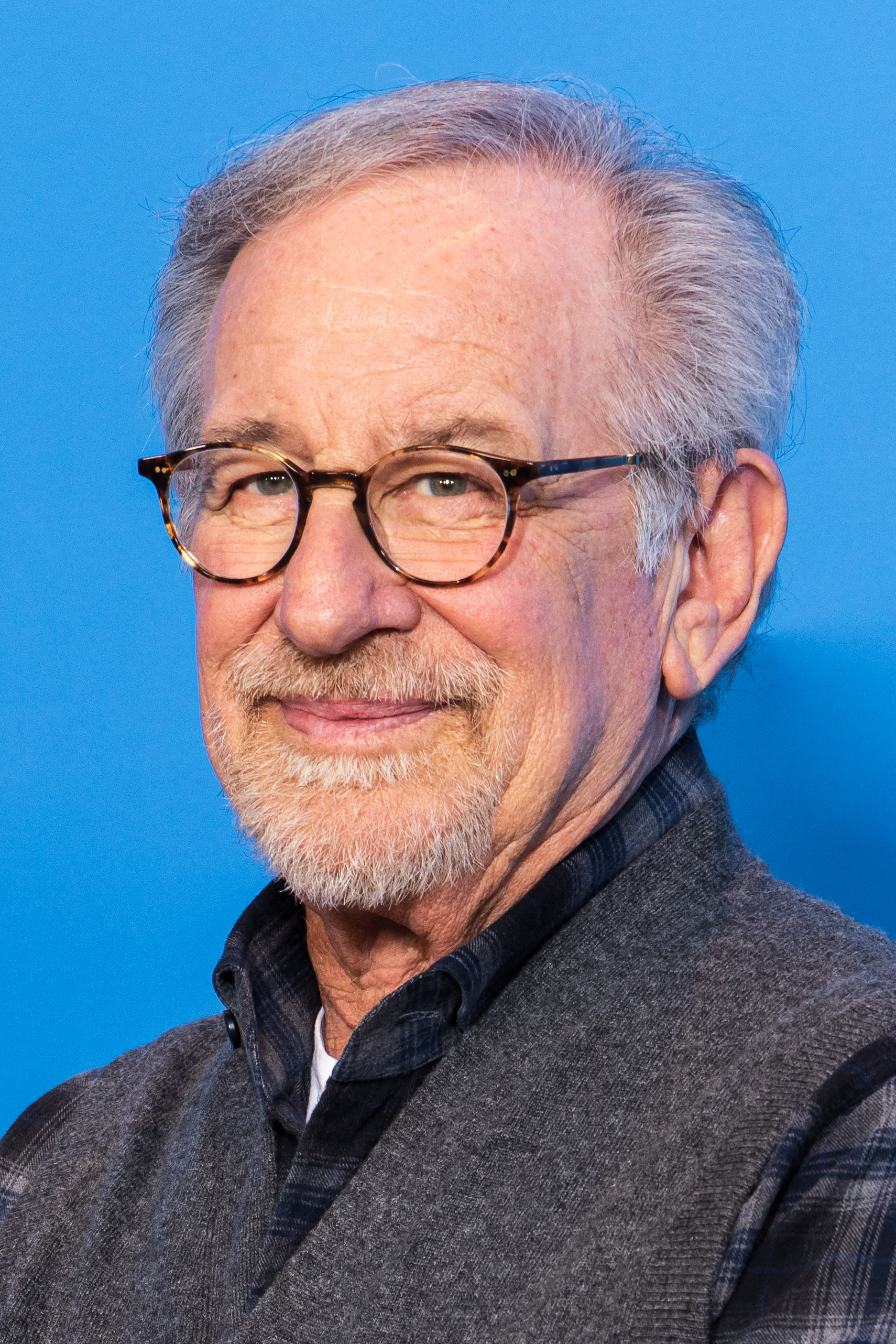
Steven Spielberg won for The Sugarland Express (1974)

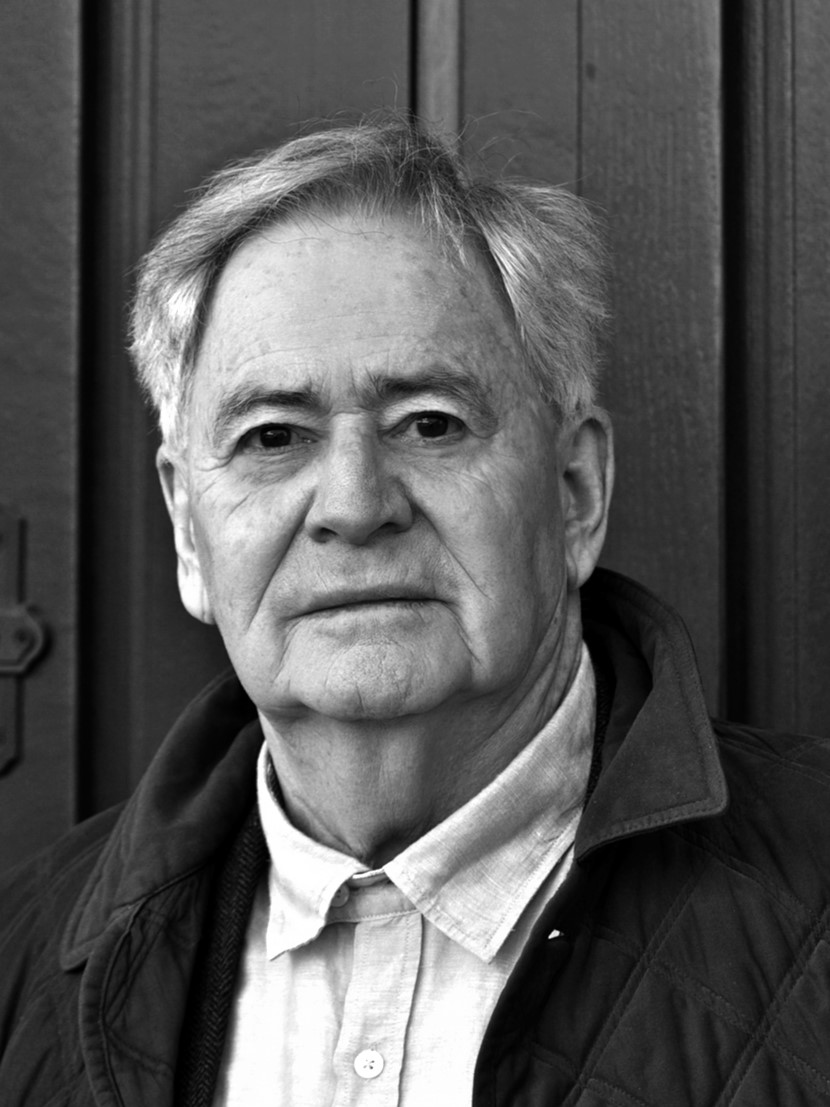
István Szabó won for Mephisto (1981)

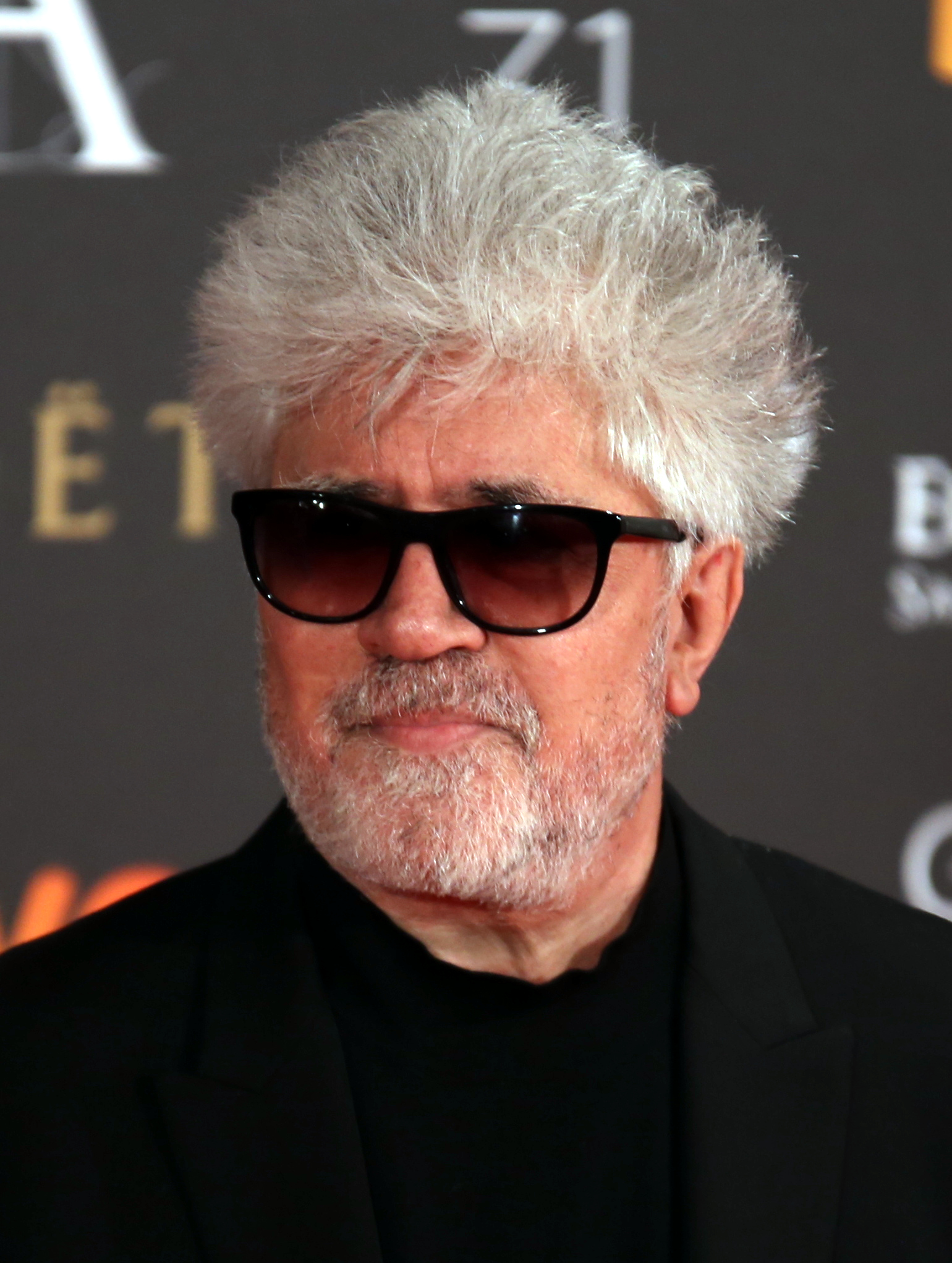
Pedro Almodóvar won for Volver (2006)

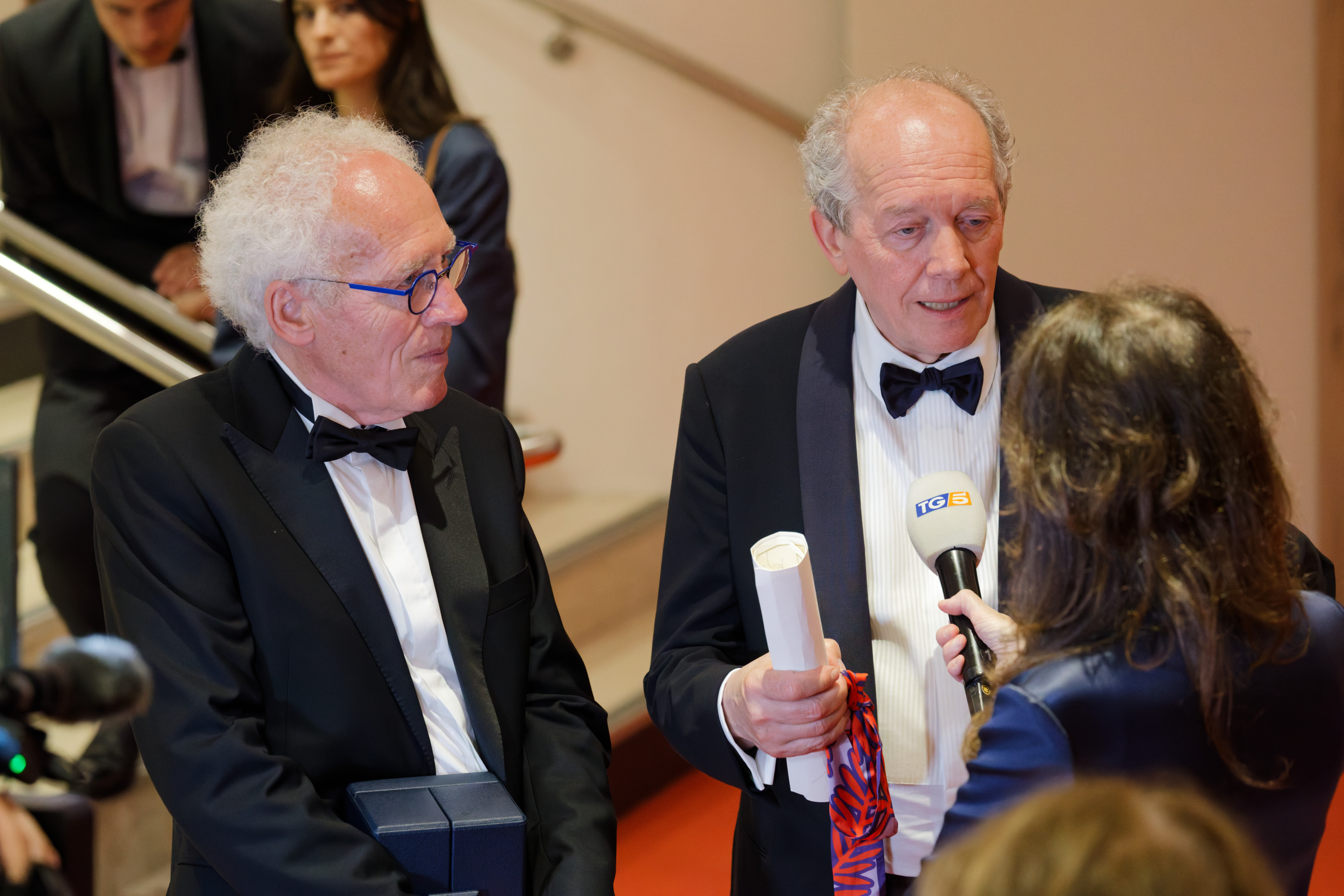
The Dardenne brothers won twice for Lorna's Silence (2008) and Young Mothers (2025)

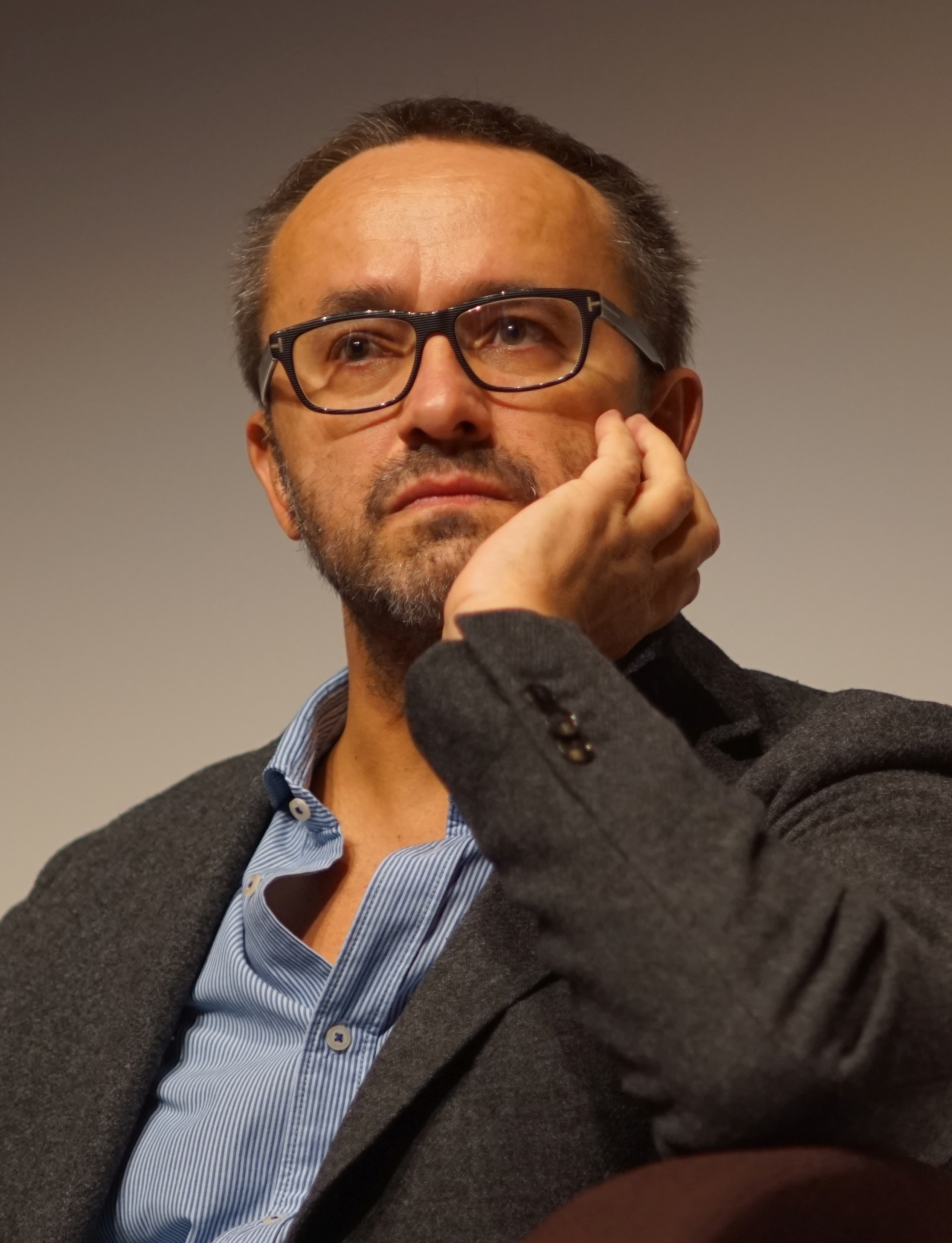
Andrey Zvyagintsev won for Leviathan (2014)

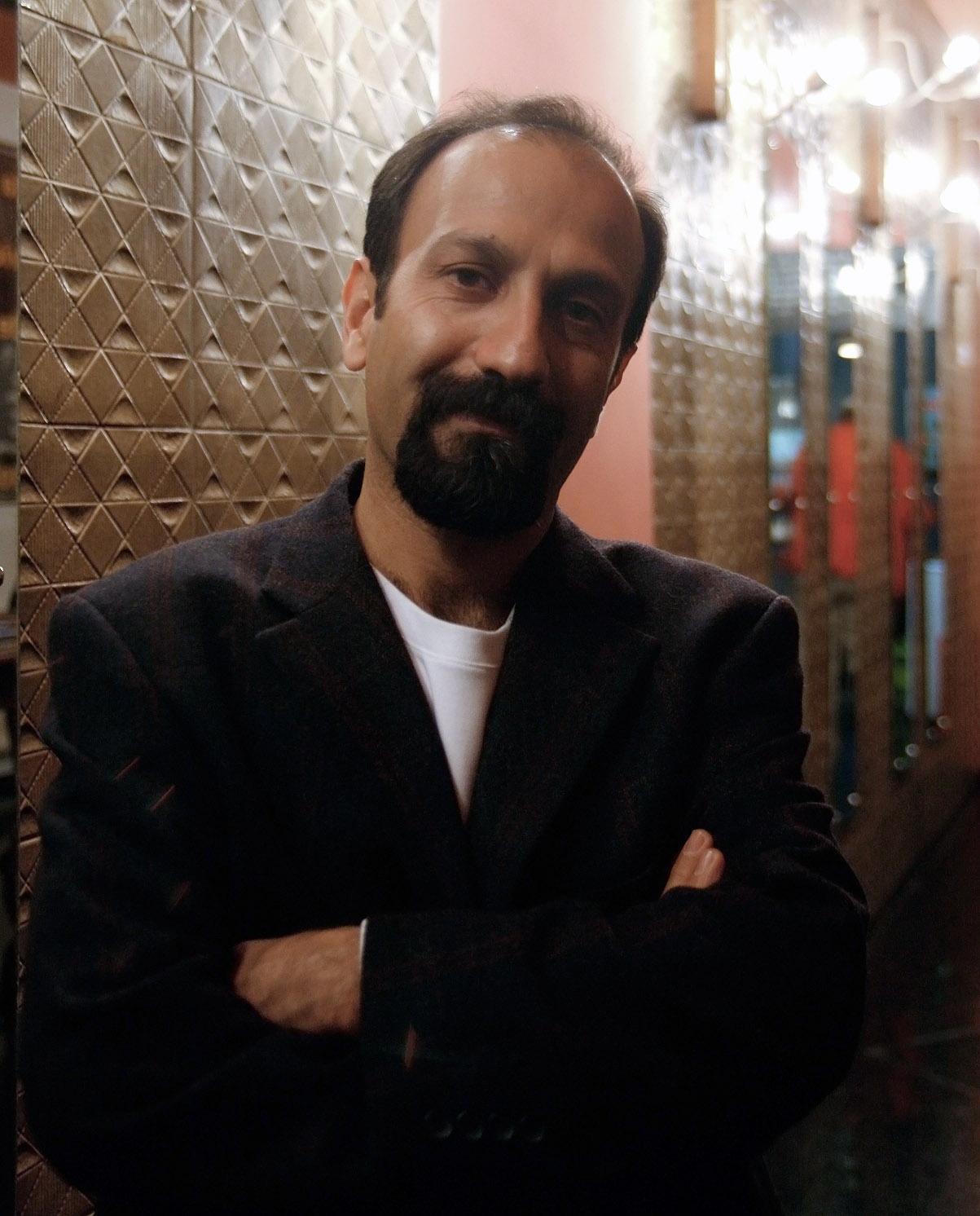
Asghar Farhadi won for The Salesman (2016)

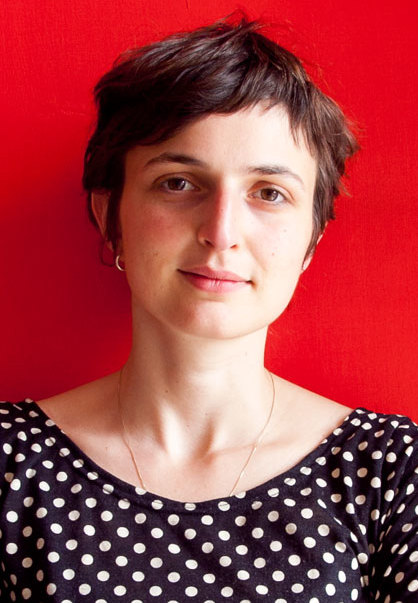
Alice Rohrwacher won for Happy as Lazzaro (2018)

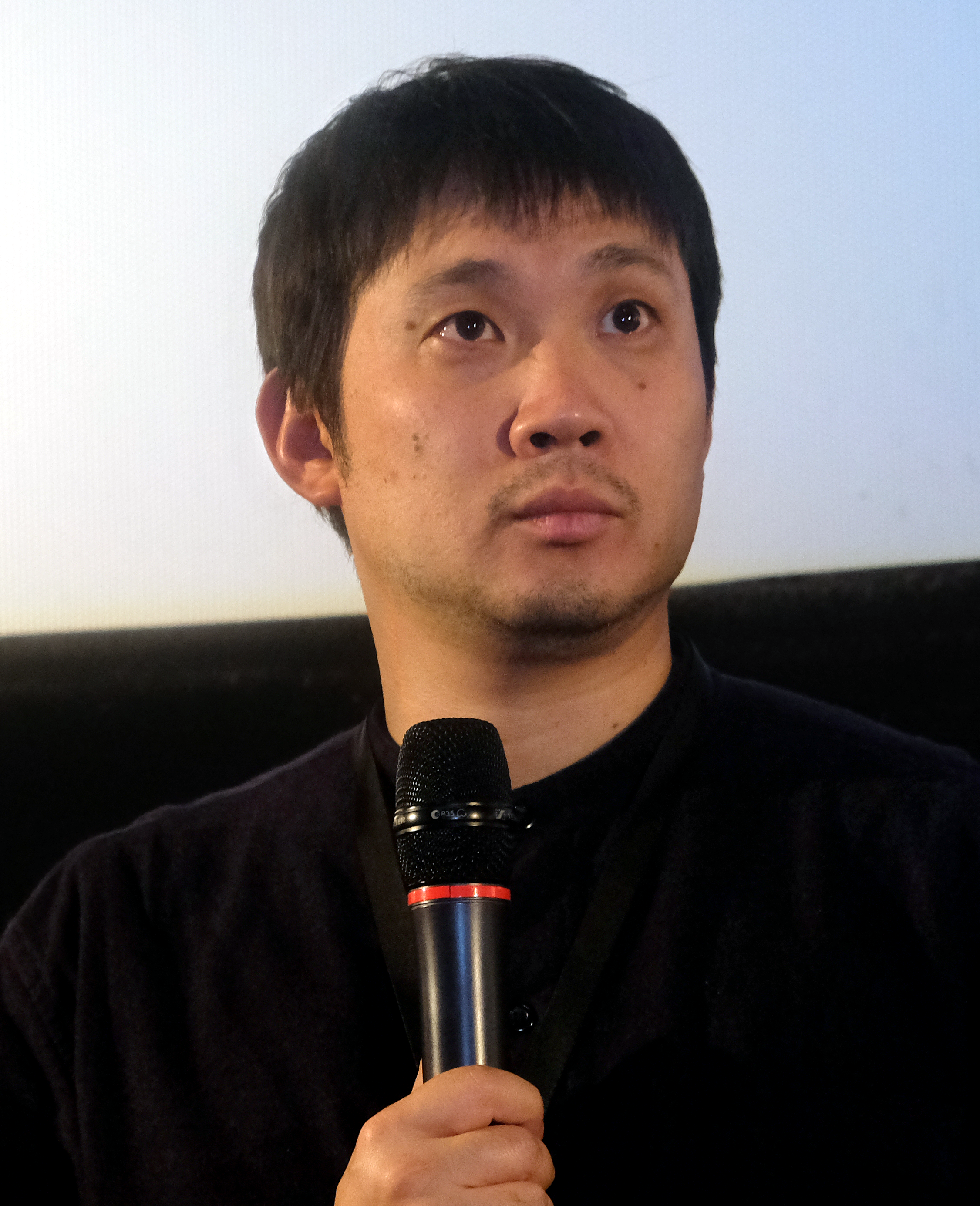
Ryusuke Hamaguchi won for Drive My Car (2021)

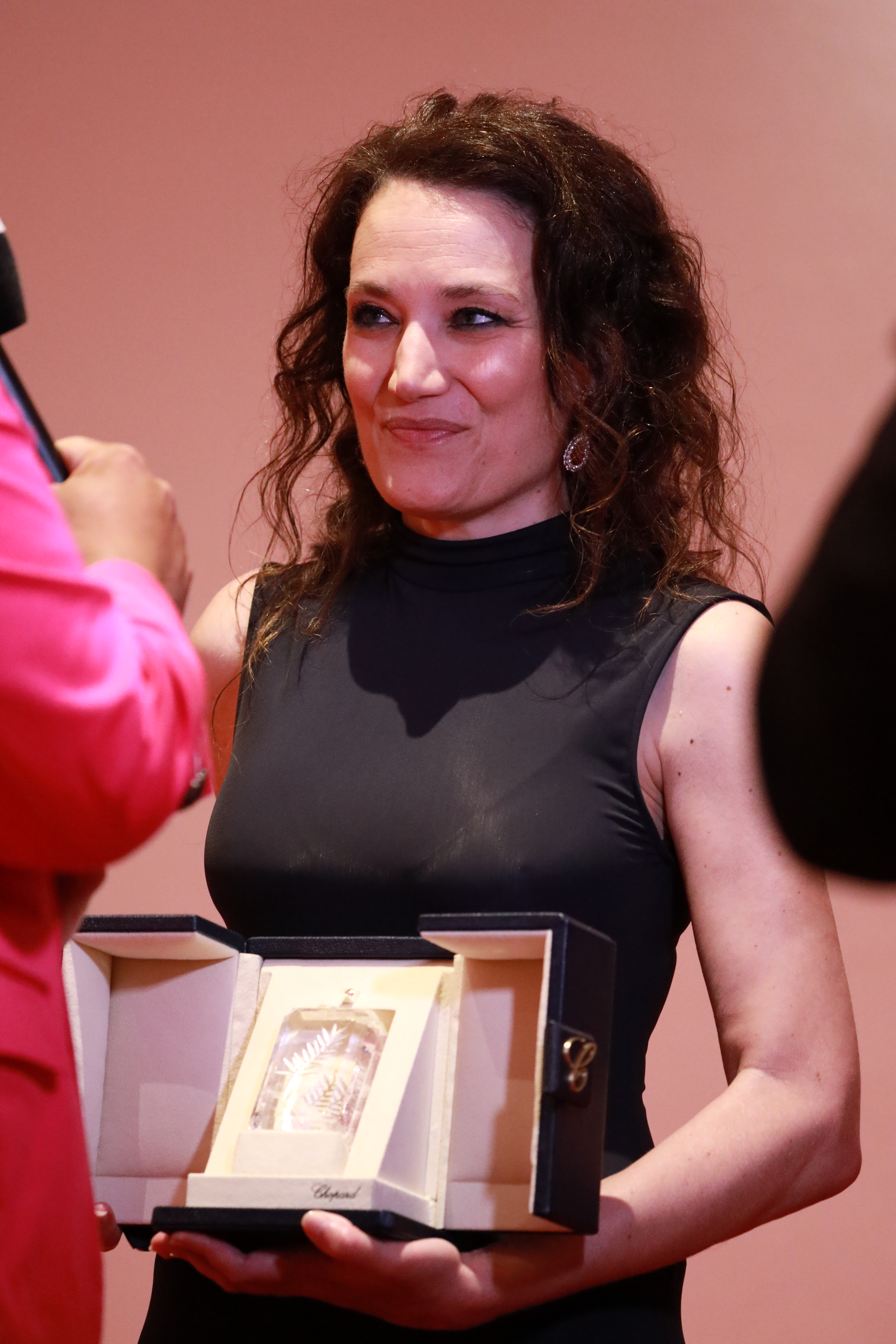
Coralie Fargeat won for The Substance (2024)

=== 1940s ===
Year	Screenwriter(s)	English Title
1949	Alfred L. Werker, Eugene Ling and Virginia Shaler	Lost Boundaries

=== 1950s ===
Year	Screenwriter(s)	English Title	Original Title
1951	Terence Rattigan	The Browning Version	
1952	Piero Tellini	Cops and Robbers	Guardie e ladri
1958	Pier Paolo Pasolini, Massimo Franciosa and Pasquale Festa Campanile	Young Husbands^{[A]}	Giovani mariti

=== 1960s ===
Year	Screenwriter(s)	English Title	Original Title
1963	Dumitru Carabat, Henri Colpi and Yves Jamiaque	Codine	
1965	Ray Rigby	The Hill	
1965	Pierre Schoendoerffer	The 317th Platoon	La 317ème section
1967	Alain Jessua	The Killing Game	Jeu de massacre
1967	Elio Petri	We Still Kill the Old Way	A ciascuno il suo

=== 1970s ===
Year	Screenwriter(s)	English Title
1974	Steven Spielberg, Hal Barwood and Matthew Robbins	The Sugarland Express

=== 1980s ===
Year	Screenwriter(s)	English Title	Original Title
1980	Furio Scarpelli, Agenore Incrocci and Ettore Scola^{[B]}	La Terrazza	
1981	István Szabó	Mephisto	
1982	Jerzy Skolimowski	Moonlighting	
1984	Thanassis Valtinos, Theo Angelopoulos and Tonino Guerra^{[C]}	Voyage to Cythera	Ταξίδι στα Κύθηρα

=== 1990s ===
Year	Screenwriter(s)	English Title	Original Title
1994	Michel Blanc	Grosse fatigue	
1996	Jacques Audiard and Alain Le Henry	A Self Made Hero	Un héros très discret
1997	James Schamus	The Ice Storm	
1998	Hal Hartley	Henry Fool	
1999	Yuri Arabov	Moloch	Молох

=== 2000s ===
Year	Screenwriter(s)	English Title	Original Title
2000	James Flamberg and John C. Richards	Nurse Betty	
2001	Danis Tanović	No Man's Land	Ničija zemlja / Ничија земља
2002	Paul Laverty	Sweet Sixteen	
2003	Denys Arcand	The Barbarian Invasions	Les Invasions barbares
2004	Agnès Jaoui and Jean-Pierre Bacri	Look at Me	Comme une image
2005	Guillermo Arriaga	The Three Burials of Melquiades Estrada	
2006	Pedro Almodóvar	Volver	
2007	Fatih Akin	The Edge of Heaven	Auf der anderen Seite
2008	Jean-Pierre and Luc Dardenne	Lorna's Silence	Le Silence de Lorna
2009	Mei Feng	Spring Fever	春風沉醉的夜晚

=== 2010s ===
Year	Screenwriter(s)	English Title	Original Title
2010	Lee Chang-dong	Poetry	시
2011	Joseph Cedar	Footnote	הערת שוליים
2012	Cristian Mungiu and Tatiana Niculescu Bran	Beyond the Hills	După dealuri
2013	Jia Zhangke	A Touch of Sin	天注定
2014	Andrey Zvyagintsev and Oleg Negin	Leviathan	Левиафан
2015	Michel Franco	Chronic	
2016	Asghar Farhadi	The Salesman	فروشنده
2017	Yorgos Lanthimos and Efthymis Filippou	The Killing of a Sacred Deer	
2017	Lynne Ramsay	You Were Never Really Here	
2018	Jafar Panahi and Nader Saeivar	3 Faces	سه رخ
2018	Alice Rohrwacher	Happy as Lazzaro	Lazzaro felice
2019	Céline Sciamma	Portrait of a Lady on Fire	Portrait de la jeune fille en feu

=== 2020s ===
Year	Screenwriter(s)	English Title	Original Title
2021	Ryusuke Hamaguchi and Takamasa Oe	Drive My Car	ドライブ・マイ・カー
2022	Tarik Saleh	Boy from Heaven	صبي من الجنة
2023	Yuji Sakamoto	Monster	怪物
2024	Coralie Fargeat	The Substance	
2025	Jean-Pierre and Luc Dardenne	Young Mothers	Jeunes mères
2026	Emmanuel Marre	A Man of His Time	Notre Salut

== See also ==
- Silver Bear for Best Screenplay
- Venice Film Festival Award for Best Screenplay

== Notes ==
A: This year the award received the name Prix du scénario original (Original Screenplay Award).
B: This year the award received the name Prix du scénario et des dialogues au Festival International du Film (Screenplay and Dialogues Award).
C: This year the award received the name Prix du meilleur scénario original (Best Original Screenplay Award).
