= Mei Feng =

Chinese screenwriter and film director

Mei Feng (Chinese: 梅峰) is a Chinese screenwriter and film director.

Mei became known as a screenwriter while working with Lou Ye on films Summer Palace (2006) and Spring Fever (2009). Spring Fever won Mei a Cannes Film Festival Award for Best Screenplay. Mei's directorial debut was Mr. No Problem (2016), for which he shared the Golden Horse Award for Best Adapted Screenplay with Huang Shi. Mei again worked with Lou Ye on The Shadow Play (2018), before directing another film, Love Song 1980 (2020).
