= Lou Ye =

Chinese director and screenwriter

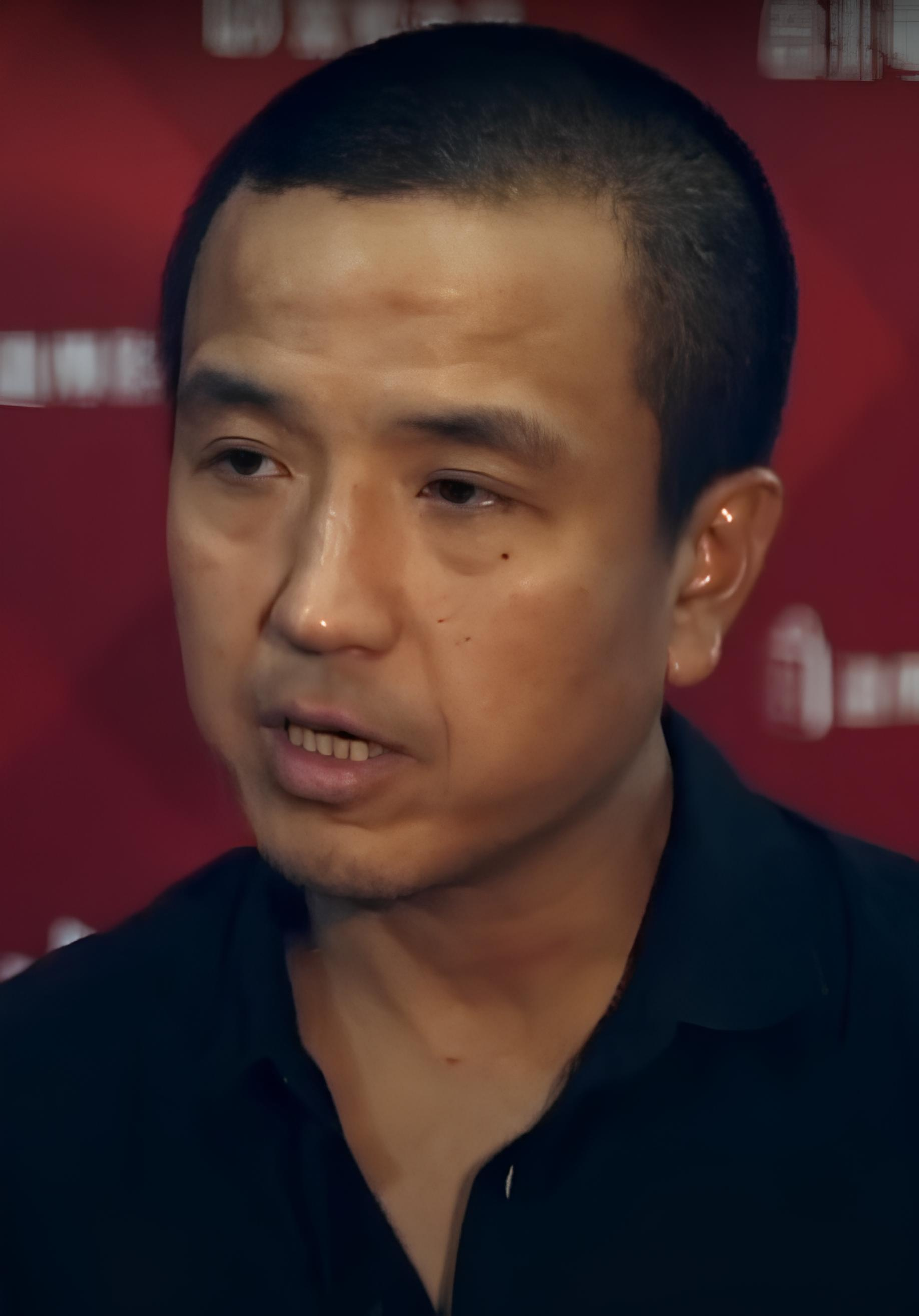
- Lou in 2014
- Born: 1965 (age 60–61); Shanghai
- Occupation: Filmmaker
- Years active: 1990s–present

Chinese name
- Traditional Chinese: 婁燁
- Simplified Chinese: 娄烨
Transcriptions
Standard Mandarin
- Hanyu Pinyin: Lóu Yè

Lou Ye (pinyin: Lóu Yè; Wade–Giles: Lou Yeh), born 1965, is a Chinese filmmaker. A leading figure of China's Sixth Generation of directors, Lou is known for his art-house vérité films about modern China, which often run afoul of Chinese censors. In June 2018, Lou became a member of the Academy of Motion Picture Arts and Sciences.

== Career ==
Born in Shanghai, Lou was educated at the Beijing Film Academy. In 1993, he made his first film Weekend Lover, but it was not released until two years later, having its world premiere at the International Filmfestival Mannheim-Heidelberg where it received the Rainer Werner Fassbinder Award. Between completion and premiere of Weekend Lover he made and released Don't Be Young, a thriller about a girl who takes her nightmares as real, in 1994. Lou, however, did not gain international prominence until his third film, the neo-noir Suzhou River. That film dealt with questions of identity and proved quite controversial upon its release in China. Upon its release, international audiences praised Suzhou River, which several critics felt evoked Alfred Hitchcock's Vertigo, particularly in how both films focus on a man obsessed with a mysterious woman.

Lou—along with actress Nai An—founded the independent production company Dream Factory in 1998, which would go on to produce most of Lou's films.

In 2003 Lou released Purple Butterfly starring Zhang Ziyi. The film is a tale of revenge and betrayal taking place during the Japanese occupation of Shanghai, with a complex narrative structure borrowing heavily from film noir traditions.

Lou's next film, Summer Palace (2006), a story of two lovers in the backdrop of the Tiananmen Square protests of 1989, again brought Lou into conflict with Chinese authorities, resulting in a five-year ban for both him and his producer. In order to circumvent the ban, his next film, Spring Fever, was shot surreptitiously in Nanjing and registered as a Hong Kong-French coproduction to avoid censors. The film was shown in competition at the 62nd Cannes Film Festival where writer Mei Feng won the Best Screenplay Award.

=== Censorship in China ===
Lou Ye's films have proven controversial in their content, and often deal with issues of sexuality, gender, and obsession. Government censors banned his first film Weekend Lover for two years, while his breakout film Suzhou River was banned (with Lou receiving a 2-year ban from filmmaking) but has since been authorized in China.

Later, after Lou submitted Summer Palace to the 2006 Cannes Film Festival without approval from Chinese censors, he was banned from film-making again, this time for five years. The film itself was also banned, though according to Lou this was because it was not up to the SARFT's standards for picture and sound quality.

Lou also had to re-edit his film The Shadow Play for two years before he was granted a distribution license in mainland China. The film's plot centers on the investigation of a corruption scandal, inspired by real events in Xiancun. It also touches upon the issue of forced evictions of urban villages in Guangzhou during China's reform and opening up.

His 2024 film portraying pandemic lockdowns, called "An Unfinished Film", was released abroad and is unavailable in China.

== Filmography ==
Year	English title	Chinese title	Notes	Ref.
1994	Don't be young	危情少女		
1995	Weekend Lover	周末情人		
2000	Suzhou River	苏州河		
2001	"In Shanghai"	在上海	Documentary short, 16m	
2003	Purple Butterfly	紫蝴蝶		
2006	Summer Palace	頤和園		
2009	Spring Fever	春风沉醉的夜晚	Cannes Film Festival Award for Best Screenplay; Golden Horse Award for Best Film Editing	
2011	Love and Bruises	花		
2012	Mystery	浮城谜事	Asian Film Award for Best Film	
2014	Blind Massage	推拿	Silver Bear for Outstanding Artistic Contribution; Golden Horse Award for Best Narrative Feature; Asian Film Award for Best Film	
2018	The Shadow Play	风中有朵雨做的云		
2019	Saturday Fiction	兰心大剧院		
2024	An Unfinished Film	一部未完成的电影	Golden Horse Award for Best Narrative Feature; Golden Horse Award for Best Director	

== Awards and nominations ==
Award	Year	Category	Film	Result	Ref.
Asian Film Awards	2013	Best Director	Mystery	Nominated	
Asian Film Awards	2013	Best Screenwriter	Mystery	Won	
Asian Film Awards	2015	Best Director	Blind Massage	Nominated	
Berlin International Film Festival	2014	Golden Bear	Blind Massage	Nominated	
Cannes Film Festival	2003	Palme d'Or	Purple Butterfly	Nominated	
Cannes Film Festival	2006	Palme d'Or	Summer Palace	Nominated	
Cannes Film Festival	2009	Palme d'Or	Spring Fever	Nominated	
Cannes Film Festival	2012	Prix Un Certain Regard	Mystery	Nominated	
Cannes Film Festival	2024	L'Œil d'or	An Unfinished Film	Nominated	
China Film Director's Guild Awards	2015	Director of the Year	Blind Massage	Won	
Festival du Film de Paris	2000	Grand Prix	Suzhou River	Won	
Gijón International Film Festival	2019	Best Director	Saturday Fiction	Won	
Golden Horse Awards	2012	Best Director	Mystery	Nominated	
Golden Horse Awards	2012	Best Original Screenplay	Mystery	Nominated	
Golden Horse Awards	2014	Best Director	Blind Massage	Nominated	
Golden Horse Awards	2018	Best Director	The Shadow Play	Nominated	
Golden Horse Awards	2024	Best Director	An Unfinished Film	Won	
International Filmfestival Mannheim-Heidelberg	1996	Special Award in memoriam Rainer Werner Fassbinder	Weekend Lover	Won	
International Film Festival Rotterdam	2000	Tiger Award	Suzhou River	Won	
TOKYO FILMeX	2000	Grand Prix	Suzhou River	Won	
TOKYO FILMeX	2024	Audience Award	An Unfinished Film	Won	
Venice Film Festival	2011	Giornate degli Autori Award	Love and Bruises	Nominated	
Venice Film Festival	2019	Golden Lion	Saturday Fiction	Nominated	
Vienna International Film Festival	2000	FIPRESCI Prize	Suzhou River	Won	
