= Blind Massage =

- Film poster
- Directed by: Lou Ye
- Screenplay by: Ma Yingli
- Based on: Massage by Bi Feiyu
- Produced by: An Nai; Kristina Larsen; Ling Li; Lou Ye; Wu Yi; Yong Wang
- Starring: Guo Xiaodong; Qin Hao; Zhang Lei
- Cinematography: Zeng Jian
- Edited by: Kong Jinlei
- Music by: Jóhann Jóhannsson
- Production companies: Dream Factory; Les Films du Lendemain
- Distributed by: EDKO Film; Uplink
- Release dates: 10 February 2014 (Berlinale); 28 November 2014 (China)
- Running time: 114 minutes
- Countries: China; France
- Language: Mandarin
- Box office: ¥7.68 million (China)

Blind Massage (Chinese: 推拿; pinyin: Tui Na) is a 2014 drama film directed by Lou Ye and based on the 2008 novel Massage by Bi Feiyu. The film entered into the competition for the Golden Bear at the 64th Berlin International Film Festival.

== Plot ==
Blind Massage focuses on a unique group in Chinese society—blind massage therapists. It explores their struggles, dreams, and emotions through interwoven stories of love, dignity, and desire, offering a nuanced depiction of their inner worlds and daily lives.

Sha Fuming and Zhang Zongqi are the co-owners of a blind massage clinic in Nanjing. Sha is charming and expressive, fond of poetry and dance, but repeatedly fails at arranged dates due to his blindness. Dr. Wang and Xiao Kong, a blind couple and friends of Sha, join the clinic with his help. Another employee, Xiao Ma, who lost his sight in a childhood car accident and once attempted suicide, lives mostly in a dream world. He becomes obsessed with Xiao Kong, calling her “Sister-in-law.”

To help Xiao Ma redirect his desire, their talented colleague Zhang Yiguang introduces him to a nearby hair salon where he meets and falls in love with a young prostitute, Xiao Man.

Du Hong, a proud and beautiful therapist, brings repeat clients to the clinic. Her beauty, however, troubles her more than it pleases. Sha eventually falls for her, captivated by her appearance, but she rejects him, saying, “You’re in love with a concept.” Meanwhile, Jin Yan and Xu Taihe are mutual lovers, but Taihe's inability to express his love openly leaves Jin heartbroken.

After being threatened by loan sharks over his brother’s debts, Dr. Wang considers using his wedding savings to repay them. Ultimately, he injures himself with a kitchen knife as an act of resistance, choosing to protect his relationship with Xiao Kong instead.

Xiao Ma gets into a violent altercation with a customer over Xiao Man and is beaten—yet miraculously regains partial vision. He later runs away with Xiao Man, and the two vanish to an unknown destination.

Du Hong suffers a thumb injury and receives donations from her colleagues for treatment. After recovering, she resigns from the clinic, believing she has burdened the others. Her departure leads to the clinic’s dissolution. Dr. Wang and Xiao Kong move to Shenzhen, Sha retires early, and Xiao Ma opens his own massage parlor with Xiao Man by his side.

== Cast ==
- Guo Xiaodong as Lao Wang
- Qin Hao as Sha Fuming
- Zhang Lei as Kong
- Mei Ting as Du Hong
- Huang Xuan as Xiao Ma
- Huang Lu as Mann
- Wang Zhihua as Zhang Zongqi
- Huang Junjun as Xu Taihe
- Jiang Dan as Jin Yan
- Mu Huaipeng as Zhang Yiguang

== Reception ==
The film entered into the competition for the Golden Bear at the 64th Berlin International Film Festival. and won Silver Bear for Outstanding Artistic Contribution. It received seven nominations at the 51st Golden Horse Film Awards, and won six, namely Best Feature Film, Best New Performer, Best Adapted Screenplay, Best Cinematography, Best Film Editing and Best Sound Effects.

It has grossed ¥7.68 million at the Chinese box office.

== Production ==
The original novel Massage was inspired by author Bi Feiyu's personal experiences and reflections from frequently visiting a blind massage parlor near his home in Nanjing.

Director Lou Ye stated that adapting the novel into a film was very challenging due to the heavy focus on characters' psychological states, which are difficult to translate visually; his task was to capture the spirit of each character. He described challenges including ensemble scenes, scattered perspectives, impressionistic descriptions, and the author's use of flashbacks.

Filming began in 2012 on location in Nanjing, the setting of the original story, including locations such as a blind massage shop on Wutai Mountain, Xuanwu Lake Park, Zhujiang Road residential buildings, the Music Hall of the Population Institute, and a large hospital in the northern part of the city. Post-production was completed in early 2014, marking Lou Ye's longest working period on a film.

Blind people played a significant role both in front of and behind the camera. The crew visited many massage centers and schools for the blind to select blind actors. A consultant on blindness was invited to teach the entire crew about better communication with blind people. Additionally, a blind acting coach was hired, and the script was provided in Braille. All blind actors read the script by touch. During filming, two hours were spent before each shoot familiarizing blind actors with the environment by letting them physically explore the set.

Unlike other films, Massage opens without subtitles; the title and main credits are read aloud as voice-over. Lou Ye explained: "The voice-over is essentially a simple blind person’s audio track. This is a story about blind people, and I want blind audiences to be able to 'see' this film through sound."

Lou Ye commented: "By following the lives of blind people, I saw many things I had completely ignored before. Not only me, but the actors, cinematographers, and crew all benefited greatly. It was a learning process—no matter how famous the artist or actor, everyone has to start from zero."

== Reception ==
1905 Movie Network wrote: "By comparing the original novel with the film, it is easy to see the differences in stance and temperament between author Bi Feiyu and director Lou Ye. Bi Feiyu strives for comprehensiveness, delicacy, and an accessible, straightforward style, without overly pursuing dramatic effects, though his occasionally overly poetic language sometimes loses emotional control; Lou Ye obviously carries less of this burden, aiming for directness, interest, and vividness, with greater emotional fluctuations, while not forgetting to inject his own inextricable artistic sensibility. Bi Feiyu's novel leans more towards realism; Lou Ye's film integrates a more personalized romantic color on this basis. In my opinion, *Massage* can be said to be Lou's richest and most engaging work to date, which reflects both his personal style and the profound, solid foundation of Bi Feiyu's original novel."

Another article from the same website stated: "*Massage* is not the first film to portray blind people, but perhaps it is the first to comprehensively and multi-dimensionally present how blind people cope with the world, enabling audiences to truly feel what blind people feel. After watching the film, you will understand the huge differences between blind and sighted people: they cannot comprehend visual beauty; appearance has little importance in their love lives; they suffer from extreme insecurity and lack privacy; they cannot read social cues, often resulting in misunderstandings... The value of *Massage* lies in offering us a dimension to reflect on these differences and truly entering their world."

The film was selected as one of the "Top Ten Chinese-language Films from Mainland China, Hong Kong, and Taiwan" at the 3rd Cross-Strait Film Festival.
