= Suzhou River (film) =

- Simplified Chinese: 苏州河
- Traditional Chinese: 蘇州河
- Hanyu Pinyin: Sūzhōu hé
- Directed by: Lou Ye
- Written by: Lou Ye
- Produced by: Philippe Bober; Nai An
- Starring: Zhou Xun; Jia Hongsheng
- Cinematography: Wang Yu
- Edited by: Karl Riedl
- Music by: Jörg Lemberg
- Release dates: January 29, 2000 (Rotterdam); September 7, 2000 (Hong Kong)
- Running time: 83 minutes
- Country: China
- Language: Mandarin
- Box office: $17,500

Suzhou River (Chinese: 苏州河; pinyin: Sūzhōu Hé) is a 2000 Chinese romance film written and directed by Lou Ye, a tragic love story set in contemporary Shanghai. The film, though stylistically distinct, is typical of "Sixth Generation" Chinese filmmakers in its subject matter of contemporary China's gritty urban experience. Co-produced by the German Essential Films and China's Dream Factory, the film stars Zhou Xun in a dual role as two different women and Jia Hongsheng as a man obsessed with finding a woman from his past.

Ye's second film, Suzhou River takes as its background the chaotically built-up riverside architecture of factory buildings and abandoned warehouses along the Suzhou River, rather than the glitzy new face of Shanghai.

Though well-received abroad, Suzhou River was not screened in its native China, as Ye was banned from filmmaking for two years after screening at the International Film Festival Rotterdam without permission from Chinese authorities. It is now authorized in China.

== Plot ==
The Videographer (Zhang Ming Fan) is hired to record the performances of Meimei (Zhou Xun), who performs as a mermaid swimming in a large water tank at the Happy Tavern in Shanghai. He and Meimei fall in love, but she disappears days at a time, leaving him heartbroken.

The Videographer recalls the story of Mardar (Jia Hongsheng), a small-time crook and motorcycle courier, and Moudan (also Zhou Xun), the daughter of a rich liquor importer. Mardar is hired to drive Moudan to her aunt's apartment whenever her father brings home one of his mistresses. During their brief encounters on his motorcycle, Mardar and Moudan fall in love. Unbeknownst to Moudan, however, Mardar has become involved in a kidnapping scheme with his former lover Xiao Hong (Nai An), and the criminal Lao B (Yao Anlian), with Moudan as the target. On their orders, he imprisons Moudan in a warehouse while Xiao negotiates the ransom. The kidnapping goes awry when Lao B murders Xiao as soon as the money is delivered. Mardar, unaware of these developments, prepares to move Moudan to another location. When she learns how little money she was worth to her father and kidnappers, Moudan throws herself into the Suzhou River, apparently to her death. Mardar is arrested and imprisoned. Moudan's body, however, is never found.

Years later, Mardar returns to Shanghai and resumes his work as a courier, all the while still looking for Moudan. One night, he happens upon the Happy Tavern where he meets Meimei. Mardar, convinced she's his lost love, first spies on her in her dressing room and then seeks out the Videographer to tell his story. Later, Mardar tells Meimei about his affair with Moudan. Although initially dismissive, she finds herself falling in love with Mardar as well and has an affair with him. After being beaten one night by the owner of the Happy Tavern, Mardar heads out to the suburbs, where he discovers the real Moudan working in a convenience store. They reunite but shortly thereafter are found dead in the Suzhou River, near the spot where Moudan had disappeared years earlier.

Meimei is distraught. She and the Videographer spend one more night together before she disappears again. She leaves a note telling him that if he really loves her, he will search for and find her just as Mardar loved and found Moudan. After getting drunk on vodka gifted to him by Mardar, the Videographer decides not to pursue her.

== Cast ==
- Jia Hongsheng as Mardar (马达 Mǎdá)
- Zhou Xun as Moudan (牡丹 Mǔdan) & Meimei (美美 Měiměi)
- Zhang Ming Fong as the Videographer (uncredited)
- Hua Zhongkai as Lao B (老李 Lǎo Lǐ)
- Nai An as Xiao Hong (萧红 Xiāo Hóng)
- Yao Anlian as Boss of the Happy Tavern (酒吧老板 Jiǔbā Lǎobǎn "Bar Boss")

== Influences ==
Upon Suzhou River's release, many Western critics saw the film as heavily influenced by a number of key sources. Several noted how the film's urban romanticism reflected the works of Hong Kong director Wong Kar-wai. Others found a similar connection to Wong but in cinematographer Wang Yu's use of the hand-held camera as being similar to Wong's Chungking Express.

Critics also saw the film as an homage to Alfred Hitchcock's tale of obsessive love, Vertigo. Suzhou River's thematic use of water (in this case the titular river) and its plot of men obsessed with a woman/women who may not be who she/they say they are refer back to Hitchcock's earlier film. Even the film's score is said to echo Bernard Herrmann's classic soundtrack to Vertigo. Some critics also saw in Suzhou River elements of another Hitchcock classic, Rear Window, particularly in the character of the Videographer, the film's voyeuristic narrator.

Chinese film scholar Shelly Kraicer saw the film as an homage to the writer Wang Shuo, the so-called "bad boy" of Chinese literature, particularly in the film's noir-like characters on the margins of society, and the playing with genre conventions.

== Reception ==
Many critics felt the release of Suzhou River in the international film festival circuit heralded a major new voice in the sixth-generation movement. Critic Shelly Kracier embraced the film's take on film noir and urban life in Shanghai, praised "its self-conscious narrative playfulness" as innovative and proposed Lou Ye's directorial style "could breathe new life" into the movement. Other Western critics were captivated by the film's atmosphere and its echoes of other directors like Alfred Hitchcock and Wong Kar-wai. The British Film Institute named Suzhou River as its "movie of the month" for December 2000, writing that, "[i]n the end, it's hard not to be swept up by the strong current of Suzhou River: a seductive and atmospheric conundrum that works pleasingly as an exercise in storytelling." Other critics wrote similar praises but found the plot somewhat lacking. Critic J. Hoberman praised the film's style: "Shot with a jostling, nervous camera, Suzhou River looks great—the showy jump cuts and off-kilter close-ups belie an extremely well edited, even supple, piece of work." At the same time, however, he wrote that "Suzhou River's narrative is more than a bit cornball and not overly convincing—which is to say the movie's conviction is to be found in its formal values." A similar review came from The New York Times' A. O. Scott, who found the film emotionally distant. Even Scott, however, could not deny the allure of the film's atmospherics, describing the film as providing "impeccable attitude and captivating atmosphere."

Review aggregator Rotten Tomatoes records that 91% of reviews for Suzhou River were positive in content, with an average rating of 7.4 out of 10, while Metacritic gave a score of 76 (out of 100, based on 18 reviews), indicating "generally favorable reviews".

=== Awards and nominations ===
- Belgian Syndicate of Cinema Critics, 2001
  - Grand Prix (nominated)
- International Film Festival Rotterdam, 2000
  - Tiger Award
- Viennale, 2000
  - FIPRESCI Award, "for its realistic and documentary approach to thriller conventions, and its expressive use of narrative and cinematic structure".
- Paris Film Festival, 2000
  - Grand Prix
  - Best Actress - Zhou Xun
- Fantasporto, 2002
  - Critics' Award
