= List of Wētā Workshop works =

This is a list of works (films, television, shorts, etc.) by New Zealand studio Wētā Workshop.

== Live-action films ==
This is a list of projects featuring the conceptual design, prosthetics, armour, and physical effects work of Wētā Workshop.

=== 1980s ===
Year	Name
1989	Meet the Feebles

=== 1990s ===
Year	Name
1992	Braindead
1994	Heavenly Creatures
1994	Once Were Warriors
1996	The Frighteners
1996	Genius
1997	The Ugly
1997	Contact

=== 2000s ===
Year	Name
2001	The Lord of the Rings: The Fellowship of the Ring
2002	The Lord of the Rings: The Two Towers
2003	Peter Pan
2003	Master and Commander: The Far Side of the World
2003	The Lord of the Rings: The Return of the King
2003	The Last Samurai
2003	Perfect Strangers
2004	Hellboy
2004	Van Helsing
2005	The Chronicles of Narnia: The Lion, the Witch and the Wardrobe
2005	King Kong
2005	Kingdom of Heaven
2005	The Legend of Zorro
2005	Antarctic Journal
2006	Black Sheep
2006	The Host
2006	Eragon
2007	Bridge to Terabithia
2007	30 Days of Night
2007	Fantastic Four: Rise of the Silver Surfer
2007	The Water Horse: Legend of the Deep
2007	Rogue
2008	The Chronicles of Narnia: Prince Caspian
2008	Blackspot
2008	Love Story 2050
2008	Indiana Jones and the Kingdom of the Crystal Skull
2008	The Day the Earth Stood Still
2008	Outlander
2009	The Lovely Bones
2009	Under the Mountain
2009	District 9
2009	Avatar
2009	Aliens in the Attic
2009	Bitch Slap

=== 2010s ===
Year	Name
2010	The Devil's Rock
2010	Daybreakers
2010	The Chronicles of Narnia: The Voyage of the Dawn Treader
2010	Yogi Bear
2010	Clash of the Titans
2010	Robin Hood
2010	Gulliver's Travels
2011	Rise of the Planet of the Apes
2012	The Hobbit: An Unexpected Journey
2012	Battleship
2012	John Carter
2012	Mr. Pip
2013	The Hobbit: The Desolation of Smaug
2013	Elysium
2013	The ABCs of Death
2013	Man of Steel
2013	The Last Days on Mars
2014	The Hobbit: The Battle of the Five Armies
2014	Dracula Untold
2014	The Amazing Spider-Man 2
2014	Edge of Tomorrow
2014	Transcendence
2014	Godzilla
2014	Hercules
2014	Exists
2015	Krampus
2015	Mad Max: Fury Road
2015	I
2015	Chappie
2015	Furious 7
2015	Zhong Kui: Snow Girl and the Dark Crystal
2015	Poltergeist
2016	Remo
2016	Spectral
2016	League of Gods
2016	The BFG
2016	Rise
2016	Warcraft
2016	Gods of Egypt
2016	Batman v Superman: Dawn of Justice
2016	The Great Wall
2017	Blade Runner 2049
2017	Power Rangers
2017	Thor: Ragnarok
2017	Ghost in the Shell
2018	2.0
2018	Rampage
2018	The Meg
2018	Mortal Engines
2018	Pacific Rim Uprising
2018	A Wrinkle in Time
2018	Zhong Kui: The Demon Hunter
2019	The Wandering Earth
2019	Alita: Battle Angel
2019	I Am Mother
2019	Men in Black: International
2019	Sweetheart
2019	Jumanji: The Next Level
2019	Godzilla: King of Monsters
2019	Haunt

=== 2020s ===
Year	Name
2020	Bloodshot
2020	Mulan
2021	Mortal Kombat
2021	Dune
2022	X
2022	Thor: Love and Thunder
2022	Black Panther: Wakanda Forever
2022	Avatar: The Way of Water
2022	M3GAN
2022	Spiderhead
2022	Samaritan
2022	Pearl
2023	Cocaine Bear
2023	The Wandering Earth 2
2023	The Creator
2023	Foe
2023	Rebel Moon - Part One: A Child of Fire
2023	Meg 2: The Trench
2023	The Tank
2023	Renfield
2024	Dune: Part Two
2024	Alien Romulus
2024	Y2K
2024	Gladiator II
2024	Harold and the Purple Crayon
2024	Apartment 7A
2024	Rebel Moon – Part Two: The Scargiver
2024	Kingdom of the Planet of the Apes
2024	Godzilla x Kong: The New Empire
2024	MaXXXine
2024	Sting
2025	Tron: Ares
2025	Predator: Badlands
2025	Avatar: Fire and Ash
2025	M3GAN 2.0
2025	Death of a Unicorn
2025	The Electric State
2026	Wicker
2026	Project Hail Mary
2026	The Odyssey
2026	Heart of the Beast
2026	Whalefall

== Animated films ==
Year	Name	Studio(s) and Distributor(s)
2007	Beowulf	Paramount Pictures; Warner Bros. Pictures
2011	The Adventures of Tintin: Secret of the Unicorn	Paramount Pictures
2017	Justice League Dark	Warner Bros. Animation
2024	The Lord of the Rings: The War of the Rohirrim	New Line Cinema; Warner Bros. Animation

== Documentaries ==
Year	Name	Studio(s) and Distributor(s)
2009	Reclaiming the Blade	Galatia Films
2012	West of Memphis	WingNut Films; Sony Pictures Classics
2024	Never Look Away	General Film Corporation; Greenwich Entertainment

== Shorts ==
Year	Name
1992	Valley of the Stereos
2007	Halo 3: Landfall
2008	Eel Girl
2017	Zygote

== Television ==
This is a list of projects featuring the conceptual design, prosthetics, armour, and physical effects work of Weta Workshop.

=== 1990s ===
Year	Series	Network
1990–1992	The Ray Bradbury Theatre (Season 4–6)	USA Network
1991	The Boy from Andromeda	TVNZ
1993	The Tommyknockers	ABC
1995–1999	Hercules: The Legendary Journeys	Syndication
1995–2001	Xena: Warrior Princess	Syndication
1998–1999	Young Hercules	Fox Kids Network

=== 2000s ===
Year	Series	Network
2000–2001	Cleopatra 2525	Syndication
2005	The Fairies	Seven Network
2005–2006	Jane and the Dragon	YTV
2006–2008	The Killian Curse	TVNZ 2
2009–2011	The WotWots	TVNZ

=== 2010s ===
Year	Series	Network
2015	The Expanse (Season 1)	Syfy
2015	Childhood's End	Syfy
2015–2020	Thunderbirds Are Go	ITV
2016–2017	Cleverman	ABC
2016–2017	The Shannara Chronicles	MTV, Spike
2018–2019	Kiddets	TVNZ
2019	Fast & Furious Spy Racers	Netflix

=== 2020s ===
Year	Series	Network
2020	Altered Carbon (Season 2)	Netflix
2020	Book Hungry Bears	TVNZ 2
2021–present	Foundation	Apple TV+
2021	Invasion (Season 1)	Apple TV+
2021	Jupiter's Legacy	Netflix
2022	Love Death + Robots (Volume 3)	Netflix
2022	Star Wars: Obi-Wan Kenobi	Disney+
2022	The Lord of the Rings: The Rings of Power (Season 1)	Amazon Prime Video
2024	Beacon 23 (Season 2)	MGM+
2024	Time Bandits	Apple TV+
2024	Sunny	Apple TV+
2025	Secrets at Red Rocks	Sky Open
2025	Chief of War	Apple TV+
2025	Alien: Earth	FX, FX on Hulu

=== Television films and specials ===
Year	Films	Network
1995	Forgotten Silver	TVNZ 1
1997	Tidal Wave: No Escape	ABC
1998	A Soldier's Sweetheart	Showtime
2009	Skyrunners	Disney XD
2011	Tangiwai: A Love Story	TVNZ 1

== Music videos ==
Year	Name	Artist
2026	Children of the Sun 太陽之子	Jay Chou

== Video games ==
=== 2010s ===
Year	Name	Platforms
2011	Team Fortress 2 (Dr. Grordbort’s Game Assets)	Windows, Linux, macOS
2013	Dota 2 (Replica Weapons)	Windows, Linux, macOS
2014	Middle-earth: Shadow of Mordor	PlayStation 3, PlayStation 4, Windows, Xbox 360, Xbox One, Linux, macOS
2015	Grey Goo	Windows
2017	Middle-earth: Shadow of War	PlayStation 4, Windows, Xbox One
2018	Dr. Grordbort's Invaders	Magic Leap
2019	Dr. Grordbort’s Boosters	Magic Leap
2019	Call of Duty: Modern Warfare	PlayStation 4, Windows, Xbox One

=== 2020s ===
Year	Name	Platforms
2021	Call of Duty: Vanguard	PlayStation 4, PlayStation 5, Windows, Xbox One, Xbox Series X/S
2023	Combonauts (unreleased VR project)	Meta Quest
2024	Off the Grid	PlayStation 5, Windows, Xbox Series X/S
2025	Tales of the Shire: A The Lord of the Rings Game	PlayStation 5, Windows, Xbox Series X/S, Nintendo Switch, iOS, Android
2025	Sleep Awake	PlayStation 5, Windows, Xbox Series X/S

== Board games ==
Year	Name	Publisher
2018	GKR: Heavy Hitters	Cryptozoic Entertainment, Wētā Workshop
2019	District 9: The Boardgame	Wētā Workshop
2020	The Hobbit: An Unexpected Party	Wētā Workshop

=== Expansions ===
Year	Name	Publisher
2018	GKR: Heavy Hitters – Urban Wasteland Expansion	Cryptozoic Entertainment, Wētā Workshop
2018	GKR: Heavy Hitters – Sweet & Salty Factions Expansion	Cryptozoic Entertainment, Wētā Workshop
2021	District 9: The Boardgame (Mothership Kickstarter Pledge): District 9: The Boardgame – Faction Expansion; District 9: The Boardgame – District Boost Deployable Ally Pack	Wētā Workshop

== Publications ==
This list includes publications produced by Wētā Workshop as the primary creator and packager, it excludes general "making-of" books where the studio was merely a contributor or subject.

=== 2000s ===
Year	Name	Publisher	Distributor	ISBN
2005	The World of Kong: A Natural History of Skull Island	Weta Workshop	Pocket Books	978-1416502586
2008	Doctor Grordbort's Contrapulatronic Dingus Directory	Weta Workshop	Dark Horse Books	978-1593078768
2008	The Crafting of Narnia	Weta Workshop	HarperCollins	978-0007270583
2009	Dr. Grordbort Presents: Victory	Weta Workshop	Dark Horse Books	978-1595824639

=== 2010s ===
Year	Name	Publisher	Distributor	ISBN
2010	The Art of District 9: Weta Workshop	Weta Workshop	HarperCollins	978-0062064301
2011	The Art of The Adventures of Tintin	Weta Workshop	HarperCollins	978-0062087492
2011	Wētā: The Collector's Guide	Weta Workshop	Wētā Workshop	978-1869509293
2012	The Hobbit: An Unexpected Journey - Chronicles: Art & Design	Weta Workshop	HarperCollins	978-0007487332
2013	The Hobbit: An Unexpected Journey - Chronicles: Creatures & Characters	Weta Workshop	HarperCollins	978-0062265685
2013	The Hobbit: The Desolation of Smaug - Chronicles: Art & Design	Weta Workshop	HarperCollins	978-0062265692
2014	The Hobbit: The Desolation of Smaug - Chronicles: Cloaks & Daggers	Weta Workshop	HarperCollins	978-0007525775
2014	Smaug: Unleashing the Dragon	Weta Workshop	HarperCollins	978-0007525782
2014	The Art of Film Magic: 20 Years of Weta: Celebrating 20 Years of Creativity; 20 Years of Imagination on Screen	Weta Workshop	HarperCollins	978-0007588596
2014	Dr. Grordbort Presents: Onslaught	Weta Workshop	Titan Books	978-1782761914
2014	The Hobbit: The Battle of the Five Armies - Chronicles: Art & Design	Weta Workshop	HarperCollins	978-0062265715
2015	The Hobbit: The Battle of the Five Armies - Chronicles: The Art of War	Weta Workshop	HarperCollins	978-0007546534
2017	Middle-earth from Script to Screen: Building the World of The Lord of the Rings and The Hobbit	Weta Workshop	Harper Design	978-0062486141

=== 2020s ===
Year	Name	Publisher	Distributor	ISBN
2022	Gallipoli: The Scale of Our War	Wētā Workshop	Te Papa Press	978-1991150950
2025	The Art of The Lord of the Rings: The War of the Rohirrim	Wētā Workshop	HarperCollins	978-0008713041
