= Pūkeko Pictures =

New Zealand based entertainment company

- Industry: Animation
- Founded: 2008
- Founder: Richard Taylor; Tania Rodger; Martin Baynton
- Headquarters: Wellington, New Zealand
- Key people: Clive Spink (CEO); Jeremy Hall; Martin Baynton; Richard Taylor
- Owner: Richard Taylor; Martin Baynton

Pūkeko Pictures is a New Zealand-based entertainment company. It produces a mix of live-action, animated, games and picture books for the global entertainment market.

It was created as a partnership between the co-founders of Wētā Workshop, Richard Taylor and Tania Rodger; and author, illustrator and producer Martin Baynton.

Their first collaboration was Jane and the Dragon, a CG TV series about a girl and her pet dragon. Their subsequent television series The WotWots was nominated in 2012 for "Best Animated Television Production – Preschool" in the 2012 Annie Awards.

Clive Spink was appointed as Chief Executive Officer in 2015. In 2012, the studio signed a first look deal with FremantleMedia.

On 4 February 2013, Pūkeko Pictures partnered with British production & distribution studio ITV Studios to produce a reboot of Gerry Anderson's 1960s puppet television series Thunderbirds entitled Thunderbirds Are Go which is named after the catchphrase from the original 1960s TV series with Pūkeko Pictures would handle and create live-action models and handle animation production services via Wētā Workshop while ITV Studios would hane distribution to the upcoming reboot.

In April 2019 following the success of Kiddets, Pūkeko Pictures re-partnered with Chinese entertainment studio Hengxin Shambala Kids and joined forces with Canadian production company Breakthrough Entertainment to produce a new preschool animated series entitled Book Hungry Bears marking Pūkeko Pictures' first Canadian co-production and its second Chinese co-production as its co-founder & co-creator of The WotWots Martin Bayton would serve as creator & executive producer of the new series with Canadian broadcasters TVOKids, TFO and Knowledge Network commissioned the series. By the end of September of that year, Pūkeko Pictures had appointed 9 Story Media Group (whom they had acquired the kids & family library of co-producer Breakthrough Entertainment one year prior in July 2018) via its distribution arm 9 Story Distribution International and its global brands division 9 Story Brands to serve as the worldwide distributor & global merchandise partner for Pūkeko Pictures' upcoming television series Book Hungry Bears except for New Zealand, Australia and China.

Jeremy Hall was appointed as Head of Development & Strategy in 2018

== Works ==
=== Television series ===
| Title | Years | Network | Notes |
|---|---|---|---|
| The WotWots | 2009–2011 | TVNZ 2 | |
| Thunderbirds Are Go | 2015–2020 | CITV | co-production with ITV Studios; A reboot to Thunderbirds created by Gerry and Sylvia Anderson |
| Kiddets | 2018–2019 | TVNZ 2 | A spin-off to The WotWots; co-production with Hengxin Shambala Kids |
| Book Hungry Bears | 2020 | TVNZ 2; TVOKids, TFO and Knowledge Kids (Canada) | co-production with Hengxin Shambala Kids and Breakthrough Entertainment |

- Hundred99 Little Heroes, short-form documentary
- Jane and the Dragon, animated TV series
- Cleverman, live-action adult drama
- The Changeover, live-action feature film
