= Jinpa =

- Directed by: Pema Tseden
- Written by: Pema Tseden
- Based on: The Slayer by: Tsering Norbu; I Ran Over a Sheep; Pema Tseden
- Produced by: Wong Kar-wai; Jacky Pang
- Starring: Jinpa; Genden Phuntsok; Sonam Wangmo
- Cinematography: Lu Songye
- Edited by: William Chang
- Music by: Lim Giong; Point
- Release date: August 2018 (Venice)
- Running time: 86 minutes
- Country: China
- Language: Tibetan

Jinpa is a 2018 Tibetan-language film written and directed by Pema Tseden. The screenplay is based on the novels The Slayer by Tsering Norbu and I Ran Over a Sheep by Pema. It made its world premiere and won Best Screenplay in the Horizons section at the 75th edition of the Venice Film Festival.

== Meaning ==
The release title Jinpa (Tibetan: ལག་དསྦྱིན་པ་, Wylie: sbyin pa) is a Tibetan term meaning “generosity,” “giving,” or “the act of giving.” It is one of the Six Perfections (Pāramitās) in Mahāyāna Buddhism and refers not only to material giving, but also to offering time, protection, compassion, and the willingness to let go of self-centered attachment. The term is also commonly used as a male Tibetan given name, independent of the literal meaning. The original title was Lagmar (Tibetan: ལག་དམར་, "Butcher" or "Murderer"; Chinese: 撞死了一只羊; lit. 'Killed a sheep') .

== Plot ==
Truck driver Jinpa (Jinpa) accidentally runs over and kills a sheep as he traverses on an isolated road on the Kekexili Plateau. He then picks up a young hitchhiker (Genden Phuntsok) who is on his way to kill a man who murdered his father 10 years ago. Although they part ways later, the coincidence of these two incidents haunts Jinpa. He tries to track down the hitchhiker and stop the murder.

== Cast ==
- Kalsang Jinpa as truck driver Jinpa
- Genden Phuntsok as hitchhiker Jinpa
- Sonam Wangmo as bar owner
- Japal Tso
- Dargye Tenzin

== Awards and nominations ==
Year	Award	Category	Recipient	Result
2018	75th Venice International Film Festival	Orizzonti Prize for Best Screenplay	Pema Tseden	Won
2018	55th Golden Horse Awards	Best Director	Pema Tseden	Nominated
2018	55th Golden Horse Awards	Best Adapted Screenplay	Pema Tseden	Nominated
