= Huang Yanpei (TV series) =

- DVD cover art

Chinese name
- Traditional Chinese: 黃炎培
- Simplified Chinese: 黄炎培
Transcriptions
Standard Mandarin
- Hanyu Pinyin: Huáng Yánpéi
- Genre: Biographical, historical drama
- Written by: Feng Boming; Xiao Guilin; Hu Guangming
- Directed by: Hong Baosheng; Zhao Lei
- Creative director: Li Xinjie
- Presented by: Zhou Shaoxi; Wang Dafang; Liu Wanli; Li Xiaofeng
- Starring: Zhang Tielin; Tang Guoqiang; Liu Jin; Ma Xiaowei; Gu Wei; Zheng Weili; Hao Yang
- Composers: Guan Xia; Yang Fan
- Country of origin: China
- Original language: Mandarin
- No. of episodes: 25

Production
- Executive producers: Hong Baosheng; Yan Jinming; Ren Huanqi; Huangfu Yingjie; Zhang Min; Yang Yali; Deng Changming; Qian Jian; Zhang Sheng; He Xuewen; Guo Lishuang; Zhang Xuelai
- Producers: Chen Guangqing; Chen Zhemin; Pan Wanqing; Zhu Yong; Ou Chengzhong; Lu Xiaozhong; Liu Shunfa; Huang Xiang
- Production location: China
- Cinematography: Zhao Lei; Wu Changyan; Chen Yunfeng
- Editors: Zhang Zhimin; Zhao Zhuoya
- Running time: 45 minutes per episode

Original release
- Network: CCTV-8
- Release: 27 May 2010

Huang Yanpei is a Chinese historical television series based on the life of Huang Yanpei, a prominent educator, industrialist and politician who was also one of the founders of the China Democratic League. Directed by Hong Baosheng and Zhao Lei, the series starred Zhang Tielin as the eponymous character. The series was first broadcast on CCTV-8 in China on 27 May 2010.

== Cast ==
- Zhang Tielin as Huang Yanpei
- Tang Guoqiang as Mao Zedong
- Liu Jin as Zhou Enlai
- Ma Xiaowei as Chiang Kai-shek
- Gu Wei as Chen Yi
- Zheng Weili as Wang Jiusi
- Hao Yang as Yao Weijun
- Mi Xuedong as Du Yuesheng
- Zhang Wei as Zhuang Ziyun
- Liu Yibing as Wang Qingli
- Xiao Daiqing as Shang Yimin
- Sun Meng as Sun Yutang
- Lei Zhenyu as Shi Liangcai
- Liu Xin as Shao Lizi
- Ma Rui as Lin Suyu
- Li Yusheng as Lu Hemei
- Liu Jingfan as Zuo Shunsheng
- Wang Shiwen as Wang Shijie
- Gai Mei as Leng Yu
- Peng Guobin as Huang Jingwu
- Wan Bin as Ding Dali
- Xu Guangming as Wu Zhongyou
- Li Zhi as Yang Chengqi
- Yu Yang as Zhang Zhizhong
- Cheng Cheng as Huang Yanpei's son
- Wang Jianjun as Gu Shoucheng
- Hou Tongjiang as Yang Sisheng
- Sui Cunyi as Lai Xiaodong
- Zheng Xilong as Yu A'shun
- Fu Xiaobo as Yu Guoquan
- Bai Hongbiao as Gu Junfan
- Qi Xiaoxiao as Huang Yanpei's daughter
- Liu Di as secret agency leader
- Yan Fengqi as Zhu De
- Xiao Guilin as Peng Dehuai
- Zhou Yemang as Sun Yat-sen
- Song Weihua as Wang Ruofei
- Lin Xin as Soong Ching-ling
- Li Ou as Fan Wenlan
- Li Bao'an as Gang Yejin
- Shen Tian as Assistant Xu
- Qi Zixuan as Worker Li
- Zhao Baozhu as Driver Ma
- Luo Yuan as Lanhua
- Liang Song as Cai Yuanpei
- An Ruiyun as Zhang Jian
- Bai Qiulin as Cheng Dequan
- Zhang Dongqiang as Zhang Zhidong
- Liu Jun as Zhang Xueliang
- Choenyi Tsering as Reporter
- Long as William Burke
- Zhang Jinliang as Chu Fucheng
- Cao Yuzhou as Zhang Bojun
- Zhang Hongtao as Fu Sinian
- Zhang Rihui as Hu Juewen
- Chen Zhenghua as Liang Shuming
- Li Qiaoke as Sun Qimeng
- Wang Yingming as Zhang Qun
- An Limin as Wang Genzhong
- Wan Zheng as Pan Hannian
- Liao Chongru as Zou Taofen
- Yang Chong as Zou Jialiu
- Zhao Lei as Ino Osamu
- Liu Xiaoxi as Wang Jingwei
- Feng Boming as Teshima
- Thomas as Thomas Edison
- Zhou Qing as guard commander
- Wang Weiwei as warden

== Controversy ==
Around March 2009, when Huang Yanpei was still in production, it elicited strong criticism from Huang Fangyi, one of Huang Yanpei's sons. Huang Fangyi wrote on an online blog that his family members were extremely displeased with the historical inaccuracies and errors in the television series, and that they strongly objected to Zhang Tielin portraying his father on screen. Huang Fangyi elaborated further on these points:

- Zhang Tielin's public image and speech patterns – he has a strong Tianjin accent – does not match that of Huang Yanpei. Zhang is known for being a comedy actor so it is unsuitable for him to portray Huang Yanpei, who is known to be a serious man. It is also ironic and disrespectful to allow an actor of non-Chinese citizenship — Zhang became a British citizen in 1997 — to portray Huang Yanpei, who is known for his patriotism.
- Huang Yanpei's extramarital affair with Lin Suyu, a fictional character, is an insult to his moral character.
- Huang Yanpei was a vegetarian for most of his life but in one scene, he is shown eating maoxuewang.
- It is inappropriate for fictional characters such as Zhuang Ziyun and Shang Yimin to play significant roles in Huang Yanpei's life.
- The television series does not accurately reflect the struggles in Huang Yanpei's life. Some events in the series are historically inaccurate, such as his contributions to education and the economy. His relationship with the Chinese Communist Party is also inaccurately depicted.

Huang Fangyi mentioned that he had written to the producers, providing suggestions for changes. However, except for some kind words, he did not receive any response from them. He was not satisfied as he felt that the television series had emotionally affected his family, and said that they would continue to remain opposed to it.
