= Tashi Dawa =

Chinese novelist

- བཀྲ་ཤིས་ཟླ་བ་
- Born: February 1959 (age 67); Batang County, Sichuan, China
- Education: Lhasa Middle School
- Occupation: Novelist
- Writing career
- Language: Chinese, Tibetan
- Period: 1979–present
- Genres: Novel, short story
- Notable works: "Souls Tied to the Knots on a Leather Cord" "On the Road to Lhasa"; The Fury Shambhala
- Movement: Avant-garde

Chinese name
- Traditional Chinese: 扎西達娃
- Simplified Chinese: 扎西达娃
Transcriptions
Standard Mandarin
- Hanyu Pinyin: Zhāxī Dáwá

Tibetan name
- Tibetan: བཀྲ་ཤིས་ཟླ་བ་
Transcriptions
- Wylie: bkra-shis zla-ba

Tashi Dawa (Tibetan: བཀྲ་ཤིས་ཟླ་བ་; Chinese: 扎西达娃; born February 1959) or Zhaxi Dawa, is a Chinese novelist of half-Tibetan half-Han ethnic background. He is a distinguished Tibetan writer in China, and one of the most controversial figures associated with modern Tibet. He is best known for his novel The Fury Shambhala and short stories "Souls Tied to the Knots on a Leather Cord" and "On the Road to Lhasa", which were adapted into a film Soul on a String in 2017. He is a member of the China Federation of Literary and Art Circles (CFLAC). He is a guest professor at Tibet Minzu University and Tibet University. His works have been translated into English, Dutch, French, German, Italian, Japanese, Czech, Russian, and Swedish.

== Biography ==
Tashi Dawa was born in Batang County, Sichuan, China, in February 1959. He attended the Lhasa Middle School.

In December 1974, at the end of the Cultural Revolution, he worked in Tibetan Opera Troupe.

He started to publish works in January 1979. In October 1989, he became executive vice president of Tibet Writers Association, an affiliate of China Writers Association. Three years later, he was elected vice president of the 4th Youth Federation of Tibet Autonomous Region. He rose to become president of Tibet Writers Association in August 1995.

He entered politics in December 1992, when he was appointed a Standing Committee member of the 6th Committee of the Tibet Autonomous Region of the Chinese People's Political Consultative Conference.

In November 1999 he served as vice president of Tibet Film and Television Artists Association. He became vice president of Tibet Federation of Literary and Art Circles in August 2003, a position he held for almost eight years until he was elevated to the President position. In December 2016 he was elected a member of the 9th National Committee of the China Writers Association.

== Works ==
=== Novels ===
- The Fury Shambhala (1993) (骚动的香巴拉)

=== Short stories ===
- "Souls Tied to the Knots on a Leather Cord"
- "On the Road to Lhasa" (去拉萨的路上)

=== Book of travels ===
- The Blue Buddhist Stone Pillar (古海蓝经幢)

=== Screenplay ===
Year	English title	Chinese title	Director	Notes
2000	Song of Tibet	益西卓玛	Xie Fei	
2008	Ganglamedo	冈拉梅朵	Dai Wei	
2010	Once Upon a Time in Tibet	西藏往事	Dai Wei	
2016	Soul on a String	皮绳上的魂	Zhang Yang	

== Filmography ==
=== Film ===
Year	English title	Chinese title	Role	Notes
2017	Paths of the Soul	冈仁波齐	Himself	

== Awards ==
Date	Award	Category	Result	Notes
1994	Zhuang Zhongwen Literary Prize		Won	
2000	20th Golden Rooster Awards	Best Writing	Nominated	
2017	53rd Golden Horse Award	Best Adapted Screenplay	Nominated	
