= Kiddets =

New Zealand children's television show

- Genre: Children's television series Comedy
- Created by: Martin Baynton; Richard Taylor
- Written by: Terri Baynton; Peter Salmon; Roxane Gaiadhar; Sacha Cotter; Sarah Harpur; Lauren Jackson
- Directed by: Matthew Darragh; Dries Naude
- Voices of: Ian Harcourt; Richard Saade; Debbie Fish; Liz Mullane; Jacob Rajan; Simon Leary; Emma Draper
- Narrated by: Martin Baynton
- Theme music composer: David Long
- Composer: David Long
- Countries of origin: New Zealand; China
- Original language: English
- No. of seasons: 1
- No. of episodes: 52

Production
- Executive producers: Martin Baynton; Richard Taylor; Clive Spink; Jianfeng Wen; Bing Wang; Lisa Chatfield
- Producers: Angela Littlejohn; Jan Haynes; Jane Robertson
- Production locations: New Zealand; China
- Editor: Owen Ferrier-Kerr
- Running time: 11 minutes (television series)
- Production companies: Pukeko Pictures; Hengxin Shambala Kids Cultural Industry Development Co., Ltd.

Original release
- Network: TVNZ; Australian Broadcasting Corporation
- Release: 3 September 2018 – 2019

Related
- The WotWots

Kiddets is a New Zealand-based children's television show which debuted in 2018 and sister series to The WotWots. Created by Martin Baynton and Richard Taylor, the series uses computer animation mixed with live-action clips to follow five alien friends as they learn about life in their playroom. It currently consists of one season and a total of 52 eleven-minute episodes.

== Plot ==
The show follows five young alien friends called "Kiddets" each with an area of interest and learning; Patches (health, wealth, and safety), Dapper (arts and culture), Bounce (mechanics), Stripes (leadership) and Luna (science). They are space cadets, explorers-in-training at a space academy on planet WotWot. They learn through play in their playroom that overlooks a space port floating above their planet and occasionally reach out for help from SpottyWot and DottyWot on planet Earth.

== Production ==
The spin-off series was announced in November 2015, when Pūkeko Pictures, whom produced The WotWots, had partnered with Chinese animation production studio Guangdong Huawen Century Animation Company (now Hengxin Shambala Kids Cultural Industry Development Co., Ltd.) to produce a sister television series to The WotWots entitled Kiddets marking the first children's television series co-production between New Zealand and China with Pukeko Pictures' founder, and creators of The WotWots Martin Baynton and Richard Taylor would serve as creators of the spin-off sister series.

On 2 October 2017, Pūkeko Pictures had partnered with British distribution company Cake Entertainment to handle worldwide distribution for Pukeko Pictures' spin-off series to The WotWots franchise Kiddets except for Australia, New Zealand and China.

The Kiddets characters and their space station are animated with occasional clips from The WotWots over live-action footage by the Weta Workshop, the visual effects company founded by Taylor and Rodger, known for its work on the Lord of the Rings film trilogy.

=== Animation ===
Unlike its parent series The WotWots which was animated at Wētā Workshop, the spin-off preschool television series Kiddets was made at Hengxin Shambala's animation subsidiary, Blossom Pictures, who handled animation services for the spin-off series Kiddets, however the spin-off series had used footage of its parent series The WotWots originally made at Wētā Workshop.

== Broadcast details ==
Country	Broadcaster	Screen date
Australia	ABC1, ABC2, ABC Kids	3 April 2018
New Zealand	TVNZ 2, TVNZ On-Demand, TVNZ HeiHei	17 September 2018
China	China Central Television	December 2018
