= Souls Tied to the Knots on a Leather Cord =

Chinese short story

"Souls Tied to the Knots on a Leather Cord" (Chinese: 系在皮绳扣上的魂), also translated as "A Soul in Bondage" and "Tibet: A Soul Knotted on a Leather Thong", is a 1985 Chinese avant-garde short story by Tashi Dawa, set in Tibet. The story contains elements of metafiction and magical realism, and deals with the clash of modernization with the traditional, primitive way of life.

Zhang Yang's 2016 film Soul on a String is based on this story and "On the Road to Lhasa", also by Tashi Dawa.

== Plot summary ==
During a meeting with an aging rinpoche, a writer (the first-person narrator) realizes the rinpoche has met characters from an unfinished story of his. The writer returns and digs out his story from his chest, which begins with a young shepherd girl living by herself in the remote mountains. Normally she lives with her father, but as her father is away on one of his extended trips, her loneliness and boredom becomes unbearable. When she spots a young man passing by, she decides to sleep with him, abandon her home and follow him. The pilgrim does not love her, but tolerates her. They spend months climbing mountains and crossing rivers, ostensibly in search of Shambhala. Whenever they stop at a village, the young girl becomes fascinated by what modernization has to offer, but this agitates the pilgrim more and more. In one of their stops, the village head offers to keep the girl as his daughter-in-law, and the pilgrim agrees to abandon her.

Meanwhile, the writer has decided to begin his journey to join his characters. When he "catches" them, the man is dying from an accident caused by a tractor, with the girl caring for him. They hear the live broadcast of the 1984 Summer Olympics reverberating in the mountains, and the man dies believing he has found enlightenment.

== English translations ==
- "Souls Tied to the Knots on a Leather Cord" (translated by Jeanne Tai), in Spring Bamboo: A Collection of Contemporary Chinese Stories. Random House. 1989. ISBN 0-394-56582-7.
- "A Soul in Bondage" (translated by David Kwan), in Best Chinese Stories (1949-1989). Chinese Literature Press. 1989. ISBN 083512066X.
- "Tibet: A Soul Knotted on a Leather Thong" (translated by Herbert J. Batt), in Tales of Tibet: Sky Burials, Prayer Wheels, and Wind Horses. Rowman and Littlefield. 2001. ISBN 0-7425-0052-7.

It was also translated into other languages, for example German (as "An den Lederriemen geknotete Seele" by Alice Grünfelder).

== Awards ==
- 8th National Short Story Prize awarded by China Writers Association

== Evaluation ==
Tashi Dawa was strongly influenced by Latin American writers like Gabriel García Márquez and Jorge Luis Borges, and magical realism figures prominently in his stories. Because he only writes in Chinese, his style has often been accused by Tibetans in exile as mystifying Tibet and perpetuating the ignorance of Tibet in China, but as pointed out by Patricia Schiaffini-Vedani, magical realism also allows him "to breach political, religious, and even sexual taboos".

== Adaptation ==
Tashi Dawa and director Zhang Yang co-wrote the 2016 film Soul on a String, based on this story and "On the Road to Lhasa". The film stars Kimba and Choenyi Tsering in the lead roles.
