= The WotWots =

New Zealand children's television show

- Genre: Children's television series Comedy
- Created by: Martin Baynton; Richard Taylor
- Written by: Terri Baynton; Martin Baynton; Theo Baynton; John Carr; Janice Marriott; Peter Salmon
- Directed by: Theo Baynton
- Creative director: James McKnight
- Voices of: Nathalie Boltt; Martin Baynton; Janet Roddick
- Narrated by: Martin Baynton; Nicholas Parsons (UK); Anton Du Beke
- Theme music composer: David Long
- Composer: David Long
- Country of origin: New Zealand
- Original language: English
- No. of seasons: 2
- No. of episodes: 78

Production
- Executive producers: Martin Baynton; Richard Taylor; Tania Rodger
- Producers: Andrew Smith; Jan Haynes
- Production location: New Zealand
- Editors: Greg Daniels; James McKnight
- Running time: 10 minutes (television series)
- Production companies: Pūkeko Pictures; Weta Workshop

Original release
- Network: TVNZ; Kidzone 24; ABC Kids
- Release: 23 March 2009 – 2011

The WotWots is a New Zealand children's television show which premiered in 2009 and has since aired in several other countries worldwide. Created by Martin Baynton and Richard Taylor, the series uses a mix of live-action and animation to follow a pair of inquisitive, creative alien siblings as they learn about life on Earth. It currently consists of two series, produced from 2009 to 2011, and a total of 78 ten-minute episodes. In 2018, spin-off series Kiddets began airing.

== Plot ==
The show features a pair of tiny, young alien twin siblings who spend their days exploring the environment where their steam-powered spaceship has landed, in an effort both to learn more about Earth fauna and to try to determine what they themselves will grow up to look like. DottyWot, the smart and responsible ship's captain, spends most of her time supervising her more boisterous, fun-loving brother SpottyWot, the ship's engineer and a talented artist. Episodes are set in a zoo, at a farm, or on a beach and most often tie their discovery of an animal characteristic into their own adventures.

== Production ==
The WotWots was created and developed by children's author Martin Baynton in alliance with filmmaker Richard Taylor, who had previously worked on the TV series adaptation of Baynton's book Jane and the Dragon. WotWots is produced by Pūkeko Pictures, a production company founded by Baynton, Taylor, and Tania Rodger. Baynton's son Theo is the series' director, and his daughter Terri is one of the writers.

The puppet-like WotWots characters are animated over live-action footage by the Weta Workshop, the special effects company founded by Taylor and Rodger, well known for its work on the Lord of the Rings film trilogy. Episodes are filmed on location at Auckland Zoo, Wellington Zoo and Melbourne Zoo, as well as undisclosed beach and farm regions.

Since the WotWots' language consists almost entirely of the syllables "wot" and "wotty", Baynton also acts as an interactive narrator for the series, serving as a translator both for the aliens' efforts to understand Earth and the human viewership trying to understand them. Baynton also provides the voice for SpottyWot, while South African actress Nathalie Boltt voices DottyWot whilst Janet Roddick voices the WotWots' computer.

In September 2008, Pūkeko Pictures appointed ABC Commercial, the Australian distribution division of the Australian Broadcasting Corporation to handle worldwide distribution of the series in other countries.

On March 27, 2009, British broadcasting channel Five acquired UK broadcasting rights to The WotWots from ABC Commercial. Five appointed British production company Impossible Television to re-edit the series for the UK audience with Nicholas Parsons taking the role as narrator and British actress Fiona Lewis taking the role of the ship's computer (Baynton still provided the voice for SpottyWot).

=== Partnership with the NZ Ministry of Health ===
In August 2011, it was announced by New Zealand's Minister of Health, Tony Ryall, that the WotWots would serve as ambassadors for B4 School Checks, an initiative offering a comprehensive assessment of four-year-old children's health and development.

== Episodes ==
=== Series 1 (2009) ===
Episode no.	Episode title	Summary	Animal	Zoo
Series 1 (2009)
01	Scary Sucky Nose	In the first episode, the WotWots learn about elephants and how they use their trunks, which SpottyWot is surprised to discover aren't actually floppy ears.	Elephant	Auckland
02	Fruity Loopies	The WotWots prepare fruity loopy smoothies for breakfast and learn how giraffes use their necks in a similar fashion to the twins' drinking straws.	Giraffe	Wellington
03	Lanky Landing Legs	On a break from repairing their spaceship's landing legs, the WotWots find a pair of similarly long, pink legs in the zoo and learn how beautiful and fascinating flamingoes are.	Flamingo	Auckland
04	Spot a Dottywot	While playing hide and seek with his sister. He instead finds a human wearing a hat with what look like 'tufty-flufties' (WotWot for 'antennae'). That another animal has what looks like one big tufty-flufty...	Lion	Wellington
05	Stripe a Lotty Wotty	The WotWots explore the concept of shadows and learn about a zebra's stripes. An inspired SpottyWot sets out to 'paint' himself with shadowy stripes.	Zebra	Wellington
06	Plodda Lotty	SpottyWot is in a speedy mood, and is frustrated that his sister isn't -- until they learn how tortoises do everything slowly.	Tortoise	Melbourne
07	Drowsy DottyWot	It is a hot day and all the animals are asleep in the sun except SpottyWot, who's busy sketching a funny picture of his sister while she naps... and then has to keep her from seeing it when she wakes. They end up learning about pelicans and their very funny beaks.	Pelican	Wellington
08	Top and Tail	The WotWots' hoverchairs are running low on 'fruity fuel' (juice) which ends up leaving SpottyWot hanging off the railings. While refuelling the twins learn how monkeys use their long tails to hang about.	Monkey
09	Fluffy Puffies	The WotWots are fascinated with finding—and creating—cloud shapes in the sky. On a search for more cloudlike things in the zoo, they learn about the white fluffy fur of the polar bear.	Polar bear
10	Coughy Wot	SpottyWot's chair has a cold, and the coughs and sneezes are giving him a hard ride. While looking for a cure, the WotWots find out that a seal's bark sounds just like coughing and sneezing.	Seal	Auckland
11	Stretch and Grow	Much to SpottyWot's disappointment, even after doing extra stretching exercises he turns out to be exactly the same height as his sister. Learning how meerkats stretch up and down gives him an idea of how to ensure he's the tallest after all.	Meerkat	Wellington
12	Sneaky Squawky	The WotWots hear a magpie call outside and find its nest near their ship, shortly after which SpottyWot discovers all his bright crayons are missing. Another look outside to find them reveals that magpies like to decorate their nest with bright things...	Magpie	Wellington
13	Twisty Sticks	One of SpottyWot's tufty-flufties goes straight after sleeping on it. In sympathy, DottyWot tries to keep one of hers straight too, while they learn how porcupines have naturally straight and spiky quills.	Porcupine	Wellington
14	Skip-a-Lotty Wotty	SpottyWot is bored with skipping rope. The twins decide to head to the zoo instead, where Spotty learns that there are many different ways to have fun bouncing—especially if you're a kangaroo.	Kangaroo	Auckland
15	Bubblywots	The WotWots compete to drink up their fruity loopy smoothies so fast that they hiccup up bubbles—just like hippopotamuses, as it turns out.	Hippopotamus	Auckland
16	Egg Sighting	On a trip to the zoo, the WotWots learn about 'Not Allowed' signs, as well as how chickens sit on their eggs to keep them warm. On realising that their ship looks like a giant egg, SpottyWot promptly takes steps to keep giant chickens away.	Bantam hen	Wellington
17	HicHoppity Wot	SpottyWot has a terrible case of the hiccups. DottyWot tries to help, but it's hard to do 'hold your breath and count to ten' when you only have three digits on each hand. She decides to distract him with looking for animals instead... only to find a frog whose croaks sound like hiccups too!	Frog
18	Creepalongy Wot	SpottyWot's attempts to sneak up on his sister aren't going so well, so when the twins learn about camouflage and how it makes the serval cat so good at pouncing, Spotty is excited to try blending in himself. Unfortunately, he's also bright blue with pink spots...	Serval
19	Blinky Winky	The WotWots are sure DottyWot is unbeatable in a staring contest, until they meet an owl at the zoo. Back at the ship they learn how owls use their eyes for other things.	Owl
20	Topsy Turvy Wotty	SpottyWot tries some stunt driving loop-de-loops while on the way to the zoo. Once there, they learn how bats are also very good at hanging upside down.	Bat
21	Go the Greens	SpottyWot absolutely refuses to eat a veggie breakfast smoothie... which puts him in a tough spot when they learn about rhinos and he realises that these big, strong animals really love to eat their greens.	Rhinoceros	Auckland
22	Tickle Toes	SpottyWot has an itchy spot on his foot that he can't reach in his chair, so DottyWot tries to help—and discovers WotWot feet are very ticklish! They eventually settle down to learn how chimpanzees groom each other and do other tasks using their hands and feet.	Chimpanzee
23	HotWots	It is a very cold day and the WotWots warm up by making cocoa and turning the ship's heater up full blast, only to forget to turn the heat off again while they head out to the zoo. While trying to cool back down they learn about sheep-shearing and how it helps the animal regulate its temperature.	Sheep	Auckland
24	Copy Copy Wotty	The WotWots are playing at imitating animal sounds when they suddenly hear something imitating them. Thinking it is another WotWot wanting to join in the game, they track the mysterious yellow creature through the zoo.	Macaw
25	WetWots	Rain is keeping the WotWots indoors and a very bored SpottyWot is further disappointed that he can't see a real dinosaur. He decides instead to draw his own monster out of many animal parts, which leads the twins to discover the similarly ancient tuatara lizard.	Tuatara	Auckland
26	Slurpy Lurpy Lips	Frustrated when DottyWot would rather nap than play ball, SpottyWot decides to find someone to play with at the zoo. He is delighted when something starts throwing his ball back to him out of an enclosure—until it throws a banana peel out instead!	Orangutan	Auckland
27	Spring Wotty	DottyWot is bitterly disappointed to lose a long-jumping competition with her brother. When they learn about the springbok, its agility inspires her to try again.	Springbok	Auckland
28	Socket Sprocket Pocket	Several things—including DottyWot's chair—need fixing, but her brother keeps losing his spanner (wrench). In-between repair jobs they learn about the koala, and SpottyWot is inspired by how carefully they keep their babies close.	Koala	Wellington
29	Sir SpottyWot	The WotWots are sharing a book about knights battling dragons. An impressed SpottyWot sets his chair to imitate a fierce dragon, but when it runs out of control is forced on a real adventure to get it back. Along the way, they discover some real giant lizards.	Komodo dragon
30	Floppy Flufties	The WotWots are enjoying a 'will they be up or will they be down?' guessing game with their tufty-flufties. Anxious to find more players, they set off on a tour of the zoo and learn about the many different types of animal headgear.	Rabbit	Auckland
31	Peak-a-Beak	The WotWots try drawing pictures in the dark with their eyes closed, and are surprised to discover that it's very hard to do. They head out to further test their night vision at the nocturnal-animal exhibit at the zoo, and learn that the kiwi bird actually prefers hunting in the dark.	Kiwi	Auckland
32	The Digger They Are	The WotWots find a huge, earth-chewing mystery monster near their ship, which SpottyWot is terribly disappointed to learn is only a mechanical digger (backhoe). He cheers up when they discover what just might be real ferocious diggers.	Wombat	Melbourne
33	Laugh a Lotty	The WotWots are having a very funny day of tickling and pulling faces at each other when they suddenly hear a mysterious laugh joining in. A quick tour through the treetops to find the culprit introduces them to the kookaburra.	Kookaburra
34	Double Bumpies	SpottyWot is very excited to think he's seen an animal with two heads, but it turns out to be only a human with her baby. Back at the ship, the WotWots learn more about how animals take care of their babies, and Spotty figures out the best way to keep his teddy bear safe and cozy.	Humans
35	Ready to Roar	SpottyWot's attempt to scare his sister with a fierce growl isn't working, so the WotWots try to find a real one he can copy amid the many sounds of the zoo. But will the animal they find turn out to be too scary to study?	Tiger	Melbourne
36	Fill Bill	After a rousing game of hide-and-seek, DottyWot spots what seems to be a duck hiding in the zoo pond with only its bill visible. When the whole animal is revealed the WotWots are surprised to end up learning all about the platypus instead.	Platypus
37	Stingy Thingy	The WotWots are out smelling flowers when SpottyWot starts to play with a bee, only to get stung. He learns that some creatures have a painful way of telling you they don't want to play.	Bee/snake
38	Looky Looky	SpottyWot spots what he thinks is a creature with hundreds of eyes watching the WotWots' ship, and hurries to tell his sister. They set out to find this extraordinary monster—which turns out to be not at all what they expected.	Peacock
39	Wot a Ploppy	SpottyWot has made a drawing of an impressively large pile of droppings he's found at the zoo. On setting out to track down the animal that has made them, the WotWots have great fun learning that different animals make different 'ploppy-plops'.	Moose	Wellington
40	Prickly Prints	The WotWots head out on the trail of some interesting footprints they've spotted, which turn out to belong to the spiny echidna and inspire SpottyWot to try to make some paw prints of his own.	Echidna	Melbourne
41	True Blue	SpottyWot develops an obsession with things that are a 'beautiful blue' just like him, which—besides driving his sister crazy—leads the twins to discover the little blue penguin.	Penguin
42	Beat-Boppy Wots	The WotWots are having a dance-off, which inspires them not only to show off some truly out-of-this-world moves but to discover that ostriches and other birds are very good dancers as well.	Ostrich	Wellington
43	Picture Puzzle	SpottyWot sends his sister on a hunt through the zoo to find three animals: one that lives in water, one with stripes and one that has a pocket for its babies. In the process, DottyWot learns that kangaroos aren't the only animal with a pouch...	Possum
44	Colour Conundrums	SpottyWot is experimenting with mixing different crayon colours, and the twins learn that chameleons can actually change the colour of their skins. Can the WotWots find a way to change the colour of their own fur?	Chameleon
45	Lumpy Bumpies	SpottyWot has become fascinated with making rubbing pictures of lumpy bumpy tree bark. Both WotWots are excited to discover that a crocodile has lumpy bumpy scales as well—until they realise it also comes with big teeth and a ferociously scary roar.	Crocodile
46	Over the Rainbow	Out and about after a storm, the WotWots see a rainbow and wonder if it might be an upside-down smile, especially after they encounter the great big golden 'smile' pattern on a sun bear's fur.	Sun bear	Wellington
47	Trail Tail	The WotWots find a long slimy trail in the Zoo and trace it back to a snail. Back at the ship, they learn more about how snails move and hide in their shells, leading SpottyWot to try to make a snail trail of his own.	Snail
48	Ready to Rumble	After the WotWots learn about dingoes and how they make their own nice comfy den, SpottyWot decides to make himself a den too.	Dingo	Wellington
49	Wotter Otter	SpottyWot's latest great invention is a way to remote-control his chair from the ship's computer... which gives DottyWot all sorts of fun ideas, and later becomes very handy indeed when he accidentally drops his spanner in the otter exhibit.	Otter
50	Tufty Tops	The WotWots are thinking about their tufty-flufties, which leads them through the zoo on a search for more fascinating horns, crests and antlers of other animals. They eventually discover the sulphur-crested cockatoo, which inspires Spotty to create the most magnificent crest of all.	Cockatoo	Wellington
51	Speedy Spots	SpottyWot is feeling the need for speed. He feeds his hoverchair dandelion greens, just like fast-moving rabbits eat, and sets off on a race with DottyWot. Along the way, they learn that cheetahs can run even faster. Could it be their spots?	Cheetah
52	Ready or Notty	On a solo zoo adventure to find the red panda he's spotted, SpottyWot's excitement accidentally startles a little boy into letting his bright red balloon go. DottyWot flies the ship to the rescue, and the WotWots discover that lots of animals have red feathers, scales and fur.	Red panda	Wellington

=== Series 2 (2011) ===
Episode no.	Episode title	Summary	Animal	Zoo
Series 2 (2011)
53	Wotties of Steel	DottyWot is fascinated to discover a colony of ants on the farm. SpottyWot is completely unimpressed by such tiny creatures—until he finds out just how strong they can be.	Ant
54	Nibble Notty	SpottyWot is enjoying a loopy-fruity breakfast in the ship when someone eats his picture he was painting outside. The WotWots go in search of the culprit.	Goat
55	Wot Plants	After witnessing a farmer planting seeds in the ground, the WotWots learn how seeds can grow. Then SpottyWot decides to plant himself and try to grow a SpottyWot tree.	Seeds
56	Wot's New Pussycat	The WotWots get up one morning to find some favourite toys have been nibbled in the night. SpottyWot goes off in search of the farm cat to see if it can help them with their problem.	Cat / mouse
57	The TrottyWot	DottyWot is exploring the farm when she sees a girl grooming and riding a beautiful pony. DottyWot thinks it would be wonderful to have her very own pony to ride – if she could just find someone to be that pony.	Pony
58	Swan Lake	The WotWots are sailing paper boats when SpottyWot's boat lets in water and sinks. He catches a glimpse of the sea monster responsible and sets out to unmask it.	Swan
59	Wheelie Wots	SpottyWot decides the spaceship needs a new set of wheels and he sets off to find some replacements. He comes across the perfect wheels, but what will the ship think of them?	Donkey
60	Wot a Wormy	The WotWots spot an unusual creature through the Sneak-a-Peak Periscope. SpottyWot thinks it might be a tail that has fallen off another animal. Maybe it's a WotWot tail?	Worm
61	Milky Moo	The WotWots can't decide what to mix for their breakfast loopy drinks. Through the Sneak-a-Peak Periscope they see a cow being milked. Maybe milk would make a tasty breakfast drink?	Cow
62	Alpaca Sad	The WotWots draw imaginary animals with mixed up heads, bodies and legs. They are very excited to discover that one of their make-believe creature might really exist.	Alpaca
63	Whistle Wots	The WotWots watch as a sheepdog rounds up a group of sheep. SpottyWot is inspired, but is he inspired enough to herd up the huge mess he made a little earlier?	Sheep Dog
64	Tough Crowd	DottyWot is having a great day on the farm impersonating animals. But then she find a scarecrow who doesn't get her jokes. Will the WotWots be able to make him laugh?	Scarecrow
65	Sleepless in the Cattle	The WotWots can't sleep. The animals on the farm keep them awake at night. SpottyWot tries to quieten the animals down but he can't. Maybe it's time to leave the farm?	Turkey
66	Fronds Like These	While SpottyWot sleeps on the beach, DottyWot explores a nearby rock pool. She finds some sea anemones and wants to learn all about these amazing creatures.	Anemone
67	Moons & Moats	When the WotWots build a sandcastle on the beach, a tide comes and washes it away. So the WotWots build a second castle and learn how to protect it from the next tide.	Sandcastle/tides
68	Crabby WotWot	To SpottyWot's horror, the spaceship has run out of bananas for his loopy fruity drink. He goes in search of a giant yellow banana and discovers something altogether more exciting.	Paddle crab
69	Footprints in the Sand	The WotWots come across some mysterious foot prints on the beach. They track them across the sand and come to a bird's nest in the long grass. And the nest has eggs in it!	Pūkeko
70	Wot a Racket	The WotWots discover a large shell on the beach which sounds like it has a very large ocean inside it. SpottyWot doesn't want his sister to bring it into the ship in case they get flooded.	Conch shell
71	Gnome Sweet Gnome	The WotWots find pictures of mythical mermaids and other creatures on the ship's computer. They are convinced these creatures are real and go out in search for them on the beach.	Gnomes
72	Wind Wotty	The WotWots see a kite flying in the wind. They are fascinated and try to find out what else can be pushed and pulled by the wind. Perhaps the wind can even pull them along.	Wind
73	Tinkle Winkle	The WotWots are exploring the beach and find a starfish washed up on the sand. They want to send it home but first they have to find out where it came from.	Starfish
74	Wot Wot Bottle Wot	SpottyWot is building a beach sculpture out of driftwood when he comes across a message in a bottle. The WotWots decide to send their very own message in a bottle.	Message in a bottle
75	Wot a Grommet	The WotWots spy some surfers riding the waves. SpottyWot is enthralled but a little worried by the size of the waves. If only there was a way to ride a surf board without the surf.	Surfing
76	Wotty Hermit	DottyWot makes a picture out of shells on the beach. When she goes to show it to her brother she finds that some of the shells have moved! Can the shells be moving themselves?	Hermit crab
77	Shiver Me WotWots	SpottyWot draws a pirate's treasure map and goes out digging on the beach in search of his treasure. He doesn't have much luck until DottyWot helps by making a small addition to the map.	Pirates
78	Gulls Gulls Gulls	The WotWots spot a seagull diving down into the sea in search of fish. SpottyWot thinks this is a wonderful idea and wants to take their spaceship on an underwater adventure.	Seagull

== Broadcast details ==
Country	Broadcaster	Screen date
New Zealand	TVNZ Kidzone24	2009
Australia	ABC1, ABC2, ABC For Kids On 2, ABC 4 Kids	2009
Brazil	HBO Family Brazil	
United Kingdom	Channel 5	June 8, 2009
Poland	MiniMini	December 1, 2009 (as Kitka i Pompon)
Canada	Treehouse TV	February 22, 2010
USA	The Hub	October 11, 2010
Middle East	Baraem	
Finland	MTV3 Juniori	
Portugal	RTP	
Ireland	Raidió Teilifís Éireann	
Italy	Planet Kids	October 15, 2012
Thailand	Thai PBS	
Singapore	Okto	March 17, 2010
Malaysia	Astro TVIQ	
Latin America	HBO Family	
Turkey	Minika	
South Africa	TopTV	
Korea	C4U	March 1, 2012
Fiji	Australia Network	

In addition, selected episodes from the show's first season are currently available on Netflix in the United States and episodes can be seen online on Pluto TV's Kids TV channel (ch. 989).

== Merchandise ==
Playskool, a toy brand of Hasbro, is licensed to produce the WotWots toy range, and the toys were launched on 2 September 2009.

In 2011 the intellectual property and outbound licensing division of American Greetings Corporation announced it had acquired the licensing and merchandising rights to the WotWots. As part of the agreement with Pūkeko Pictures, American Greetings Properties signed on to represent the WotWots brand worldwide.
