= Snow Leopard (film) =

2023 Chinese Tibetan language film

- Directed by: Pema Tseden
- Written by: Pema Tseden
- Starring: Jinpa; Xiong Ziqi
- Cinematography: Matthias Delvaux
- Edited by: Jin Di
- Music by: Durkar Tserang
- Production companies: China Film Co., Ltd; Great Luck Films; OPEN Pictures; Qinghai Manishi Film Co., Ltd. iQIYI Pictures
- Distributed by: China Film Co., Ltd
- Release dates: 5 September 2023 (Venice); 3 April 2024 (China)
- Running time: 109 minutes
- Country: China
- Languages: Tibetan; Mandarin

Snow Leopard (Chinese: 雪豹; pinyin: Xue bao; Tibetan: གསའ།, Wylie: gsa') is a 2023 Chinese Tibetan-language drama film written and directed by Pema Tseden, as his final film. It premiered out of competition at the 80th edition of the Venice International Film Festival.

== Plot ==
The film is based on the story of a globally endangered animal, the snow leopard, which killed nine sheep of a herder. It explores different people's views and motives on the snow leopard killing the sheep. Each party has their own choice and persistence on whether to release the snow leopard trapped in the sheepfold. The seemingly reasonable demands have become the fuse that intensifies the conflicts among multiple parties.

== Cast ==
- Jinpa
- Xiong Ziqi
- Tseten Tashi
- Lobsang Chompel
- Genden Phuntsok

== Production ==
The film was shot between March and July 2022, in the Three Rivers Nature Reserve, in the Tibetan Plateau. It is the final film of Tseden, as he died four months before its premiere.

== Release ==
The film had its world premiere out of competition at the 80th Venice International Film Festival. It was also screened at the 2023 Toronto International Film Festival.

The film was showcased in 'China on the move' at the 23rd New York Asian Film Festival on July 21, 2024.

== Reception ==
The film was awarded Tokyo Grand Prix (Best Film) at the 2023 36th Tokyo International Film Festival. On the review aggregator website Rotten Tomatoes, 78% of 9 critics' reviews are positive, with an average rating of 6.50/10.
