= Choenyi Tsering =

- ཆོས་དབྱིངས་ཚེ་རིང་
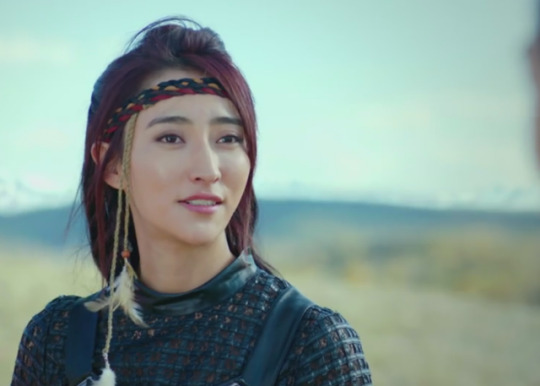
- Born: 15 May 1986 (age 40); Ngari Prefecture, Tibet Autonomous Region, China
- Education: Tibet University
- Occupation: Actress
- Years active: 1999–present
- Musical career
- Genres: Chinese Folk Music; Mandopop
- Instruments: Piano guitar

Chinese name
- Chinese: 曲尼次仁
Transcriptions
Standard Mandarin
- Hanyu Pinyin: Qǔní Cìrén

Tibetan name
- Tibetan: ཆོས་དབྱིངས་ཚེ་རིང་

Choenyi Tsering (Tibetan: ཆོས་དབྱིངས་ཚེ་རིང་; Chinese: 曲尼次仁; born 15 May 1986) is a Chinese actress and singer of Tibetan descent. Choenyi Tsering was best known for her roles as Princess Aliya on Love Yunge from the Desert (2013) and Zhang Lihua/ Zhu Gui'er on Heroes in Sui and Tang Dynasties (2013) and also starred in a number of films, including Zhanian Instrument (1999), Women Who Know How to Flirt Are the Luckiest (2013), Zhong Kui: Snow Girl and the Dark Crystal (2014), and Soul on a String (2017).

== Early life and education ==
Choenyi Tsering was born in Ngari Prefecture, Tibet Autonomous Region, China, on 15 May 1986. She aspired to act from an early age. She graduated from Tibet University.

== Acting career ==
At the age of 13, Choenyi Tsering appeared in an advertisement for a Tibetan medicine. It was her first ever advertising campaign as a model.

Choenyi Tsering made her film debut in Zhanian Instrument (1999), playing Gesang. The film was produced and distributed by CCTV-6.

In 2002, she attended the Tourism Ambassador of Tibet trials and won the Champions. In the following year, she got the first place in the "Fifty-six Golden Flower Beauty Pageant of National Minorities" contest.

After playing minor roles in various films and television series, Choenyi Tsering received her first leading female role in a series called Changpiao Zhuangge (2008).

In 2009, she won the top place in Come on! Oriental angel (《加油！东方天使》), a Talent Show program aired on Dragon Television.

In 2010, Choenyi Tsering became the Penghu Islands Tourist Image Propaganda Ambassador. That same year, she appeared uncredited in the biographical historical television series Huang Yanpei as a journalist.

Choenyi Tsering's first major film role was in Wuye Paimen (2011). It was released on 26 August 2011.

In 2013, she had key supporting role as Princess Aliya in Love Yunge from the Desert. She was praised for her role. The series was produced by Yu Zheng and stars Angelababy, Du Chun, Lu Yi, Chen Xiao and Yang Rong. That same year, she was cast as Zhang Lihua/ Zhu Gui'er in Heroes in Sui and Tang Dynasties, which was produced by Zhejiang Yongle Film & TV Production. The series is an adaptation based on Chu Renhuo's historical novel Sui Tang Yanyi. She had a minor role as Jia Jia in Pang Ho-Cheung's Women Who Know How to Flirt Are the Luckiest, a romance film starring Huang Xiaoming, Zhou Xun, Sonia Sui and Evonne Xie.

In 2014, Choenyi Tsering appeared as Du Juan in the shenmo television series New Mad Monk. It is a sequel to The Legend of Crazy Monk. The television series earned critical acclaim. She got a small role as a Western beauty in the fantasy action adventure film Zhong Kui: Snow Girl and the Dark Crystal. The film is directed by Peter Pau and Zhang Tianyu and stars Chen Kun, Li Bingbing, Winston Chao, Yang Zishan, Bao Bei'er, and Jike Junyi.

In 2016, she had a cameo appearance in Ice Fantasy, adapted from Guo Jingming's bestselling novel of the same title. It is directed by Ju Jue Liang, and stars Feng Shaofeng, Victoria Song, Ma Tianyu, and Zhang Meng. The series was broadcast in July 2016 on Hunan Satellite Television. At the end of that same year, she sung a song with Tashi Dhondup on the CCTV New Year's Gala.

In 2017, Choenyi Tsering co-starred with Kimba and Siano Dudiom Zahi in Soul on a String as the Qiong, a Tibetan shepherdess. It is based on the short stories Tibet: Soul on a String (《西藏，系在皮绳结上的魂》) and On the Road to Lhasa (《去拉萨的路上》) by Tashi Dawa. The film premiered at the 19th Shanghai International Film Festival on 15 June 2016, and opened in China on 18 August 2017.

== Filmography ==
=== Film ===
Year	Title	Chinese title	Role	Notes
1999	Zhanian Instrument	《弹起我的扎年琴》	Gesang	
2011	Wuye Paimen	《午夜拍门》	Jin He	
2013	Women Who Know How to Flirt Are the Luckiest	《撒娇女人最好命》	Jia Jia	
2014	Zhong Kui: Snow Girl and the Dark Crystal	《钟馗伏魔：雪妖魔灵》	A Western beauty	
2017	Soul on a String	《皮绳上的魂》	Qiong	
2018	Lost in Mobius	记忆折叠	Nanxi	support role
2019	The Climbers	攀登者	Hei Mu Dan	
2020	Modern Wong Fei Hung	摩登黄飞鸿	Fang Xue Yan	Main Role
2022	The Mysterious Incident in Lop Nur	罗布泊神秘事件	Xue Xiao	Main Role
2022	Battlefield: Alien	战地：异种浩劫		main role
2023	Chang Yue Jin Ming	长月烬明	Yue Ruan Ruan	support role
2024	you are from 2029	来自2029的你	Joey	

=== TV series ===
Year	Title	Chinese title	Role	Notes
2008	Changpiao Zhuangge	《长漂壮歌》	Yangjin	
2010	Huang Yanpei	《黄炎培》	A journalist	
2011	Untold Story of Tibet	《西藏秘密》	Cong Mei	
2012		《热巴情》	Dawa	
2013	Love Yunge from the Desert	《大汉情缘》	Princess Aliya	
2013	Heroes in Sui and Tang Dynasties	《隋唐演义》	Zhang Lihua/ Zhu Gui'er	
2013	Eagles in Tibet	《雪域雄鹰》	Ciyang	
2014	New Mad Monk	《新活佛济公》	Du Juan	
2016	Ice Fantasy	《幻城》	Yang Dan	
2019	The Legend of White Snake	新白娘子传奇	Lady Wu	
2019	Ming Dynasty	大明风华	Qi Muge	
2023	Chang Yue Jin Ming	长月烬明		
2023	Where Snowdrops bloom	雪莲花盛开的地方	Dolma	leading

=== Drama ===
Year	Title	Chinese Title	Role	Notes
2006	Amazing Homes	《神奇的家园》		

== Singles ==
Year	Title	Chinese title	Notes
2009		《爱无界锁定金生》	
2009	Stubborn Gentle	《倔强的温柔》	
2010	Dance with me	《与我同舞》	
2014	I'm Waiting for You in Marpuse	《我在瑪旁雍措等你》	
2014	The Lhasa Auspicious Clouds Float	《祥云飘起的拉萨》	
