= Martin Baynton =

British writer

Martin Baynton is a British author, illustrator, and TV producer now living in New Zealand. His children's book Jane and the Dragon (1988), has become a modern classic which has since been adapted for television and produced by Weta Workshop and Nelvana. His books have been widely published in the UK, US, Spain, France, New Zealand and Australia. Baynton has also illustrated books by other leading writers including Russell Hoban and Kenneth Grahame.

In addition to writing and illustrating children's books, Baynton has been a producer, writer and director for the stage, TV and radio. He is the creator of three internationally acclaimed pre-school shows: The WotWots, The Kiddets, and The Book Hungry Bears. In 2002 he teamed up with Richard Taylor of Weta Workshop to create and produce children's television. They created the award-winning Jane and the Dragon, based on Baynton's book series of the same name.

Baynton and Taylor are founding partners and owners of Pukeko Pictures, a New Zealand-based IP development company creating children and family entertainment properties.

In 2022, Baynton released the first book in his Taking Wonderland series, a trilogy of fantasy novels about a modern Alice decoding the original Victorian books.

== Early life ==
Born in Wandsworth, London in 1953, the second of three children his childhood and schooling was spent in London, Surrey, Buckinghamshire and Herefordshire.

Educated at Holtspur Primary School, Hereford Cathedral Prep School, Ledbury Grammar School, Hereford College of Art, the Institute Of Child Health, London University and Great Ormond Street Hospital.

Before focusing on a career in children's books, he qualified as an electrophysiologist and worked at St Bartholomew's Hospital in the medical electronics unit where he helped to develop biofeedback technology with the biofeedback pioneer Dr Ann Wooley-Hart.

Baynton travelled extensively in the 1970s hitch hiking through North and Central America, Europe and the Middle East. He was an activist in the anti-nuclear movement in the UK and an early member of Greenpeace and Friends of the Earth.

Baynton moved to New Zealand in 1987 with his wife Diane and his children, Theo and Terri.

== Bibliography ==
Baynton is a writer and illustrator of many books, and anthologies.

| Title | Role | Year | Notes |
|---|---|---|---|
| Jane and the Dragon | writer & illustrator | 1988 | inspired the TV series Jane and the Dragon |
| Jane and the Magician | writer & illustrator | 2000 | A Jane and the Dragon series book |
| The Dragon's Purpose | writer & illustrator | 1989 | A Jane and the Dragon series book |
| Daniel's Dinosaurs | illustrator | 1991 | Written by Mary Carmine |
| Fifty Saves His Friend | writer & illustrator | 1985 | Published exclusively for J Sainsbury plc |
| Fifty and the Fox | writer & illustrator | 1986 | |
| Fifty and the Great Race | writer & illustrator | 1986 | |
| Fifty Gets the Picture | writer & illustrator | 1986 | |
| Fifty's Christmas | writer & illustrator | 1987 | |
| Why Do You Love Me? | writer & illustrator | 1990 | |
| Baby Floats | writer & illustrator | 1991 | |
| Under The Hill | writer & illustrator | 1996 | |
| Little Red Riding Hood | illustrator | 1982 | Written by Brothers Grimm |
| Goldilocks and the Three Bears | illustrator | 1982 | Written by Brothers Grimm |
| Hansel and Gretel | illustrator | 1982 | Written by Brothers Grimm |
| The Three Little Pigs | illustrator | 1982 | Written by Brothers Grimm |
| Big John Turkle | illustrator | 1983 | Written by Russell Hoban |
| Jim Frog | illustrator | 1983 | Written by Russell Hoban |
| Charlie Meadows | illustrator | 1984 | Written by Russell Hoban |
| Lavinia Bat | illustrator | 1984 | Written by Russell Hoban |
| Mousewing | illustrator | 1987 | Written by William Mayne |
| Welcome to the Wonderful World of The WotWots | writer & illustrator | 2009 | From The WotWots TV series |
| Three's a Crowd | writer & illustrator | 2008 | A Jane and the Dragon series book |
| A Dragon's Tail | writer & illustrator | 2008 | A Jane and the Dragon series book |
| Wind in the Willows | illustrator | 1995 | Written by Kenneth Grahame |
| Up and Down | writer & illustrator | 2009 | From The WotWots TV series |
| Over and Under | writer & illustrator | 2009 | From The WotWots TV series |
| Fast and Slow | writer & illustrator | 2009 | From The WotWots TV series |
| Out and In | writer & illustrator | 2009 | From The WotWots TV series |
| Dragonblade | writer & illustrator | 2022 | A Jane and the Dragon series book |
