= Tenzing (film) =

2026 historical drama film by Jennifer Peedom

- American promotional poster
- Directed by: Jennifer Peedom
- Written by: Luke Davies
- Produced by: Liz Watts; Emile Sherman; Iain Canning; Jennifer Peedom; Luke Davies
- Starring: Genden Phuntsok; Tom Hiddleston; Willem Dafoe; Caitríona Balfe; Tenzin Dalha
- Cinematography: Stefan Duscio
- Edited by: Simon Njoo
- Music by: Rebekka Karijord
- Production companies: Apple Studios; See-Saw Films; India Take One Productions; Stranger Than Fiction Films
- Distributed by: Apple TV (worldwide); Piece of Magic Entertainment (Australia); Altitude Film Distribution (United Kingdom)
- Release dates: September 4, 2026 (Telluride); October 9, 2026 (United States); October 16, 2026 (Apple TV)
- Running time: 125 minutes
- Countries: Australia; United Kingdom; United States; India; Nepal
- Language: English

Tenzing is a 2026 biographical film directed by Jennifer Peedom and written by Luke Davies. An international co-production, the film stars Genden Phuntsok as Tenzing Norgay, Tom Hiddleston as Edmund Hillary, and Willem Dafoe as John Hunt. It is based on Nepalese-Indian Sherpa guide Norgay's 1953 ascent of Mount Everest with New Zealand climber Edmund Hillary.

The film had its world premiere at the 53rd Telluride Film Festival on September 4, 2026, followed by theatrical release in the United States and Australia on October 9, 2026, ahead of release on Apple TV worldwide on October 16. It has received critical acclaim from critics.

== Synopsis ==
Tenzing is based on the true story of Nepalese-Indian Sherpa Tenzing Norgay's 1953 ascent of Mount Everest with New Zealand climber Edmund Hillary. Although the achievement brought accolades, most attention has historically focused on Hillary, and this film aims to tell more about Tenzing.

It includes scenes from his childhood, as well as his role as a husband and father, how he had become a guide on an earlier expedition, and how he persuaded this expedition to include him as a full climbing member. Mount Everest is portrayed from Tenzing's point of view, which the European climbers come to respect, as the goddess Chamolangma.

== Cast ==
- Genden Phuntsok as Tenzing Norgay
  - Tenzin Dalha as Tenzing (Younger)
  - Samdrup Dorje Lama as Tenzing (Boy)
- Tom Hiddleston as Edmund Hillary
- Willem Dafoe as John Hunt
- Caitríona Balfe as Jill Henderson
- Thinley Lhamo as Dawa
- Tenzin Jigmey as Pasang
- Johnny Flynn as George Mallory

== Production ==
The film was directed and produced by Australian filmmaker Jennifer Peedom, in her narrative feature film debut (she previously directed the 2015 documentary film Sherpa, among others). The script was written by Australian writer Luke Davies. It was originally set up at Netflix and Higher Ground Productions in 2021. It was produced by Liz Watts of See-Saw Films, along with Desray Armstrong, Peedom and Davies, with Pravesh Sahni as co-producer. Rakesh Singh was line producer for Itop Film Productions. Tenzing Norgay's eldest son, Norbu Tenzing, was an executive producer, along with Simon Gillis and David Michôd.

Originally in production at Netflix and Higher Ground Productions, worldwide rights to the project were acquired by Apple TV+ in a competitive bidding war at the Marché du Film in May 2024.

In May 2024, Tom Hiddleston was cast as Edmund Hillary and Willem Dafoe as John Hunt, with Netflix and Higher Ground no longer attached. Dafoe had previously narrated two of Peedom's documentary films. Caitríona Balfe joined the cast in May 2025. Thinley Lhamo had an undisclosed role in the film, while Genden Phuntsok joined the cast as Tenzing Norgay in June 2025. The film also includes a cameo appearance from Johnny Flynn as British mountaineer George Mallory.

In preparation for filming, Hiddleston met Phuntsok, and they trekked together for six days, following Norgay and Hillary's route to the Everest base camps.

Stefan Duscio was responsible for cinematography, Melinda Doring for production design, and Simon Njoo for editing the film. Principal photography commenced in Nepal in May 2025, with filming on location in Kathmandu and the Everest region. Filming took place at high altitude, first in Nepal and then Aoraki / Mount Cook in the Southern Alps of New Zealand, used to simulate the peak of Mount Everest. Filming wrapped on August 7, 2025 in New Zealand.

Post-production was done by Spectrum Films in Australia. No special effects were used.

== Release ==
The film had its world premiere at the 53rd Telluride Film Festival on September 4, 2026. It also screened at the 2026 Toronto International Film Festival on September 15.

The film opened the Zurich Film Festival in its European premiere on September 24, with Hiddleston, Dafoe, and Peedom attending the opening night gala.

Tenzing was released in select cinemas in the United States and Australia on October 9, 2026, before being released on Apple TV worldwide on October 16. Piece of Magic Entertainment has distribution rights in Australia, while Altitude Film Distribution is the UK distributor.

== Reception ==
On review aggregator website Rotten Tomatoes, the film holds an approval rating of 97% based on 72 reviews with an average rating of 7.3/10. The critical consensus reads, "Immersive and tasteful, Tenzing is a rock-solid adventure that pays overdue tribute to a mountain-climbing pioneer who history unfairly overlooked." Metacritic, which uses a weighted average, assigned the film a score of 67 out of 100, based on 18 critics, indicating "generally favorable" reviews.

=== Accolades ===
Tenzing won the 49th Mill Valley Film Festival overall audience award on October 12, 2026.
