= Jane and the Dragon =

Children's book series

Jane and the Dragon book cover

Jane and the Dragon is a series of children's books written and illustrated by Martin Baynton. The original trilogy consists of Jane and the Dragon (1988), The Dragon's Purpose (1989), and Jane and the Magician (2000). In 2008 two further books followed: Three's a Crowd and A Dragon's Tail.

The first book features Jane, a young girl whose mother is a lady-in-waiting to the queen. Jane is expected to grow up in her mother's footsteps, but wishes to become a knight. When the royal prince is kidnapped by a dragon (who lives in a cave in the kingdom), Jane sets out to rescue the boy. She does and becomes a squire in the process. She does not slay the dragon but instead befriends him, and they soon become best friends. Their adventures continue in the next four books.

Baynton says that the inspiration for the books came from his wanting to write "a story about a girl who wanted to follow her dreams despite the expectations of her family and friends" and from a young girl telling him "how she hated fairy stories because the girls were wimps".

The book series inspired an animated series on television.

== Dragonblade ==
In 2022 Martin Baynton started publishing Dragonblade, a Jane and the Dragon novel. It is available to read online on the new Jane and the Dragon website.

== See also ==
- Lily Quench
