= Golden Goblet Award for Best Cinematography =

Chinese film award

The Golden Goblet Award for Best Cinematography (Chinese: 金爵奖最佳摄影) is a prize given to the films in the main category of competition at the Shanghai International Film Festival.

== Award winners ==
Year	Film	Cinematographer
2002	Life Show	(China) Sun Ming
2003	no award this year	
2004	Brothers	(Finland) Marita Hallfors, Pekka Uotila
2004	Evil	(Sweden) Peter Mokrosinski
2005	In My Father's Den	(New Zealand) Stuart Dryburgh
2006	Our Land	(Italy) Fabio Cianchetti
2007	The Go Master	(China) Wang Yu
2008	My Mother's Tears	(Germany) Florian Schilling
2009	Nowhere Promised Land	(France) Nicolas Guicheteau, Hans Meier
2010	Ondine	(Republic of Ireland) Christopher Doyle
2011	Friday Killer	(Thailand) Tiwa Moeithaisong
2012	Falling Flowers	(China) Shi Luan
2013	Reliance	(Sweden) Vachan Sharma/Paul Blomgren Dovan
2014	The Scared Arrow	(China) Luo Pan
2015	Sunstroke	(Russia) Vladislav Opeliyants
2016	Soul on a String	(China) Guo Daming
2017	Kharms	(Russia) Shandor Berkeshi
2018	Friday's Child	(United States) Jeff Bierman
2019	Spring Tide	Jake Pollock
