= Genden Phuntsok =

Tibetan-Chinese actor

- དགེ་འདུན་ཕུན་ཚོགས།
- Born: October 27, 1985 (age 41); Ganzi, Sichuan, China
- Occupation: Actor
- Years active: 2006-present

Chinese name
- Chinese: 更登彭措
Transcriptions
Standard Mandarin
- Hanyu Pinyin: Gèngdēng Péngcuò

Tibetan name
- Tibetan: དགེ་འདུན་ཕུན་ཚོགས།

Genden Phuntsok is a Tibetan actor. He portrays Tenzing Norgay in the 2026 biographical film Tenzing.

== Career ==
An actor of Tibet descent, Phuntsok portrayed hitchhiker Jinpa in 2018 Tibetan-language film Jinpa, written and directed by Pema Tseden, winner of Best Screenplay in the Horizons section at the 75th edition of the Venice Film Festival.

In 2023, Phuntsok could be seen in Tseden's final film Snow Leopard, which was awarded Tokyo Grand Prix (Best Film) at the 2023 36th Tokyo International Film Festival.

Phuntsok portrays Himalayan mountaineer Tenzing Norgay in the 2026 biographical film Tenzing alongside Tom Hiddleston and Willem Dafoe.

== Partial filmography ==
Key
†	Denotes works that have not yet been released

Year	Title	Role	Notes
2018	Jinpa	Hitchhiker Jinpa	
2023	Snow Leopard	Zaden	
2026	Tenzing	Tenzing Norgay	
