= Lily Quench =

Lily Quench is a series of children's novels written by Natalie Jane Prior and illustrated by Janine Dawson.

== Novels in the series ==
1. Lily Quench and the Dragon of Ashby released 9 February 2004
2. Lily Quench and the Black Mountains
3. Lily Quench and the Treasure of Mote Ely
4. Lily Quench and the Lighthouse of Skellig Mor
5. Lily Quench and the Magicians' Pyramid
6. Lily Quench and the Hand of Manuelo
7. Lily Quench and the Search for King Dragon

There is also a companion book called Lily Quench's Companion and Guide to Dragons and the Art of Quenching.

== Awards and nominations ==
- 2002 Lily Quench and the Treasure of Mote Ely shortlisted for the Aurealis Award for Best Children's Long Fiction
- 2003 Lily Quench and the Lighthouse of Skellig Mor won the Aurealis Award for Best Children's Short Fiction
- 2003 Lily Quench and the Magicians' Pyramid shortlisted for the Aurealis Award for Best Children's Short Fiction

== See also ==
- Jane and the Dragon
