= Soul on a String =

- Poster for the 2016 Toronto International Film Festival
- Traditional Chinese: 皮繩上的魂
- Simplified Chinese: 皮绳上的魂
- Hanyu Pinyin: Píshéngshàng de Hún
- Directed by: Zhang Yang
- Written by: Tashi Dawa; Zhang Yang
- Produced by: Li Li
- Starring: Kimba; Choenyi Tsering; Siano Dudiom Zahi; Yixi Danzeng
- Cinematography: Guo Daming
- Edited by: Le Wei
- Music by: Zhang Jian
- Production companies: Madeng Film Limited Company; Lichenguang International Cultural Media Limited Company
- Release dates: 15 June 2016 (Shanghai International Film Festival); 18 August 2017 (China)
- Running time: 142 minutes
- Country: China
- Languages: Mandarin; Tibetan

Soul on a String (Tibetan: རྒྱུད་སྐུད་སྟེང་གི་རྣམ་ཤེས) is a 2016 Chinese Tibetan-language adventure film directed by Zhang Yang and co-written by Zhang Yang and Tashi Dawa, based on Tashi Dawa's short stories "Souls Tied to the Knots on a Leather Cord" and "On the Road to Lhasa" (去拉萨的路上). It stars Kimba, Choenyi Tsering, Siano Dudiom Zahi, and Yixi Danzeng. The film premiered at the 19th Shanghai International Film Festival on June 15, 2016, and opened in China on August 18, 2017.

== Plot ==
Tabei (塔贝) is a hunter who had killed countless animals. While hunting a deer, he is killed by lightning. But it isn't long before that he is saved by the Gautama Buddha, who orders him to escort a treasure to a holy land of Tibetan place named "Zhangwendi" (掌纹地).

== Cast ==
- Kalsang Jinpa as Tabei, a hunter
- Choenyi Tsering as Chung, a beautiful and lonely shepherdess who is pregnant with Tabei's child
- Siano Dudiom Zahi as Zhandui, elder brother of Guori, who wants to find Tabei for revenge
- Yixi Danzeng as Pu, a mute and Tabei's attendant.
- Genden Phuntsok as Guori
- Sonam Nyima
- Sonam Wangmo as bosslady

== Production ==
Madeng Film Limited Company and Lichenguang International Cultural Media Limited Company purchased the film rights. The script for the film was finished in 2007 written by Tashi Dawa. The film was wrapped in 2014.

Most of the film was shot on location in southwest China's Tibet Autonomous Region.

== Release ==
The film premiered in 19th Shanghai International Film Festival on June 15, 2016, with wide-release in China on August 18, 2017.

== Reception ==
On the review aggregator website Rotten Tomatoes, 89% of 9 critics' reviews are positive.

== Accolades ==
Date	Award	Category	Recipients	Result	Notes
2015	53rd Golden Horse Award	Best New Performer	Kimba	Nominated	
2015	53rd Golden Horse Award	Best Adapted Screenplay	Tashi Dawa	Nominated	
2015	53rd Golden Horse Award	Best Cinematography	Guo Daming	Nominated	
2015	53rd Golden Horse Award	Best Makeup & Costume Design	Lei Jing	Nominated	
2015	53rd Golden Horse Award	Best Original Film Score	Zhang Jian	Nominated	
2015	53rd Golden Horse Award	Best Sound Effects	Yang Jiang and Zhao Nan	Nominated	
2016	19th Shanghai International Film Festival	Golden Goblet Award for Best Cinematography	Guo Daming	Won	
2016	19th Shanghai International Film Festival	Golden Goblet Award for Best Feature Film	Soul on a String	Nominated	
2018	9th China Film Director's Guild Awards	Best Film	Soul on a String	Nominated	
2018	9th China Film Director's Guild Awards	Best Director	Zhang Yang	Nominated	
