= Kalsang Jinpa =

Kalsang Jinpa or Jinpa (Tibetan: སྐལ་བཟང་སྦྱིན་པ།, Wylie: skal bzang sbyin pa, Chinese: 金巴; born 6 April 1985) is an actor from Maqu County, Gansu, China. He is a graduate of the Beijing Film Academy. His notable films include Soul on a String, for which he was nominated for Best New Performer at the 53rd Golden Horse Awards.

In July 2023, Jinpa starred in director Pema Tseden's film, Snow Leopard, which was selected for the Special Screenings section of the 80th Venice Film Festival. In a China Movie Channel interview, Jinpa said that being nominated for Best Actor was the highest form of recognition and that he reminds himself to maintain a normal mindset. When discussing his collaboration with director, Jinpa highlighted that during the filming of the film, the director gave him a lot of freedom and room to perform, which allowed him to understand the lines from the perspective of Tibetan proverbs, making his performance feel more authentic.

== Personal life ==
As a published poet, Jinpa also stated that he uses literature, such as Dostoevsky's The Brothers Karamazov, to help him understand and develop his characters by exploring themes like family relationships and human conflict.

== Awards and nominations ==
| Year | Award | Category | Work | Result | Ref. |
|---|---|---|---|---|---|
| 2016 | 53rd Golden Horse Awards | Best New Performer | Soul on a String | Nominated | |
| 2020 | 14th Asian Film Awards | Best Supporting Actor | Balloon | Nominated | |
| 2022 | 16th FIRST International Film Festival | Best Actor | One and Four | Won | |
| 2022 | China Movie Channel Media Awards | Most Media-featured Supporting Actor | Back to Tibet | Won | |
| 2023 | 36th Golden Rooster Awards | Best Supporting Actor | Back to Tibet | Nominated | |

== Reception ==
According to Beijing Youth Daily, Jinpa delivered a "breakthrough performance" in the film One and Four. In his previous works, Jinpa typically portrayed characters with rough and bold personalities, which established him as a Tibetan "tough guy". However, in One and Four, the forest ranger he plays is weak, timid, and indecisive, creating a strong contrast with his large and imposing physique.
