= Yang Sisheng =

Qing dynasty person CBDB = 76916

- 杨斯盛
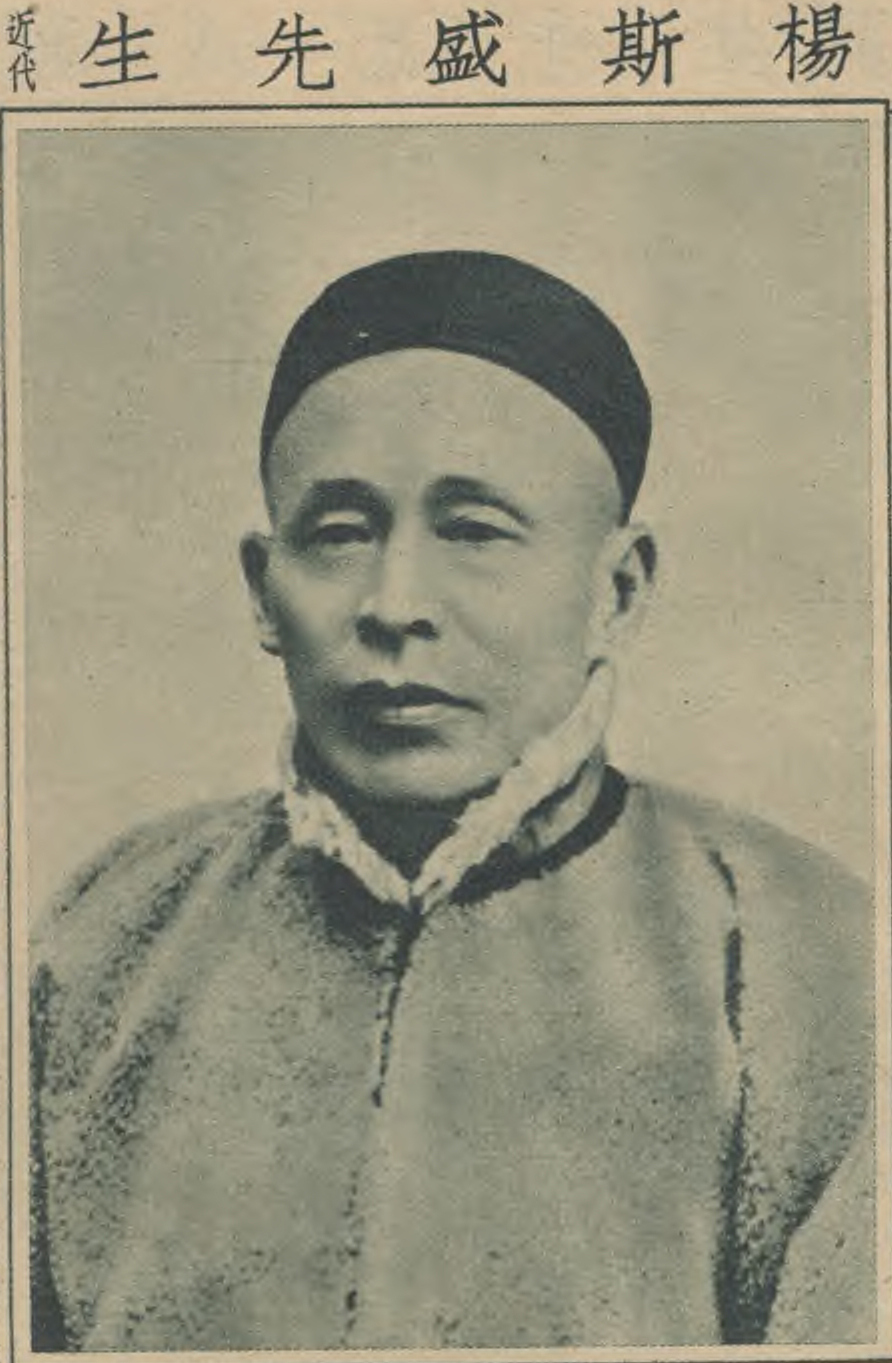
- Born: 1851; Chuansha, Shanghai, Qing China
- Died: 1908 (aged 56–57)
- Occupations: Architect; Construction entrepreneur
- Known for: Founder of Yang Rui Tai Co.; construction of the Shanghai Customs House II

Yang Sisheng (simplified Chinese: 杨斯盛; traditional Chinese: 楊斯盛; Wade–Giles: Yang Ssu-sheng, 1851–1908) was a Chinese bricklayer-turned-architect best known for being the leader of the first modern Chinese construction company in Shanghai. He also used his personal wealth to build many schools in the city.

== Early life ==
Yang was born in Chuansha in the outskirts of Shanghai to a family of carpenters. Orphaned in his early years, he became a stonemason in Shanghai at age 13.

== Construction works ==
Yang worked for Palmer & Turner Group as a full-time craftsman, and was familiar with western-style blueprints and contracts. In 1880, Yang registered the first native construction company, Yang Rui Tai Co. (楊瑞泰營造廠), in the Shanghai French Concession.

A year later, during the construction of the Customs House II, the Italian builder quit the piling task due to soft soil and rising underground water. As the subcontractor, Yang studied and experimented with the soil, and finally succeeded with the piling work. Later, he took over the entire building project. When the building was constructed in 1893, his reputation was established in both the Chinese and foreign sections in Shanghai.

In 1904, he established the Jui Ho Brick and Tile Company, Ltd., China's first modern brick and tile company.

== Commitment to education ==
His reputation made him an acquaintance of the educational reformer and fellow Chuansha native Huang Yanpei. With Huang's help, he established several schools in Shanghai. In 1904, he set up a primary school in an ancestral hall, and converted a villa into Guangming Primary School (廣明小學). In 1905, he established the Guangming Normal Lecturing Institute (廣明師範講習所). In 1906, he built Pudong Secondary School after buying over 40 acres in Liuliqiao. Additional schools in Pudong include two primary schools in Cailu and Heqing and a night school. He also donated 120,000 silver to Pudong Secondary School. Before his death, he donated hundreds of acres in Hengsha to fund the Keqin Institute in Tiqiao. His deeds were widely publicized in China, particularly after his death in 1908.

== Evaluation by later generations ==
The renowned scholar Hu Shi highly praised Yang Sisheng's character and his act of "sacrificing his family fortune to promote education." In his collected essays Forty Self-Narratives, the first chapter is titled Biography of Yang Sisheng, China's Greatest Man. Mr. Hu Shi was once invited to inscribe for Pudong Middle School: "Mr. Yang vowed to cultivate talent for the nation. All students should likewise aspire to forge themselves into useful individuals."

== Bibliography ==
- Wu, Qian (2021). "Yang Sisheng". In Suzuki, Shin'ichi; McCulluoch, Gary; Gu Mingyuan; Rao, Parimala; and Hong, Ji-Yeon (eds.). The Routledge Encyclopedia of Modern Asian Educators, 1850–2000. Routledge.
- Roskam, Cole (2019). Improvised City: Architecture and Governance in Shanghai, 1843–1937. Seattle: University of Washington Press, pp. 119–120. ISBN 9780295744780.
- Ye, Jingxian; Fivet, Corentin (2018). "Construction Technology Transfer in Shanghai in the Nineteenth to Twentieth Centuries". In Wouters, Ine; et al. (eds.). Building Knowledge, Constructing Histories. CRC Press, pp. 281–289.
- Zhang, Y. (2008). "被胡适誉为‘中国第一伟人’的杨斯盛" [Yang Sisheng, Hailed by Hu Shi as "China's Greatest Man"]. 世纪 (Century), no. 6, pp. 48–50.
- Wang, K. (2011). 民国时期上海华人营造业群体研究 [Research on the Chinese Construction Industry Group in Shanghai during the Republic of China Period]. Master's thesis, Shanghai Normal University.
- "Brick and Tile Industry". Chinese Economic Journal and Bulletin, vol. 18, no. 1, 1936, p. 63.
