= Sharad P. Paul =

New Zealand skin cancer specialist and author

- Dr. Sharad P. Paul in 2024
- Born: 1966 (age 59–60); England
- Citizenship: New Zealand
- Occupation: Physician
- Years active: 1996–present
- Website: www.drsharadpaul.com

Sharad P. Paul is a New Zealand-based skin cancer specialist, family physician, social entrepreneur, author and philanthropist. He has authored works of fiction including novels, poetry, non-fiction books, medical books, and scientific journal articles.

He founded the Baci Foundation—a charitable trust that focuses on literacy and health projects in lower socioeconomic schools.

== Early life and education ==
Paul was born in England, and grew up in India. His parents moved to India when he was a child, and he has lived in New Zealand since 1991. He graduated as a Doctor of Medicine from the University of Madras in 1988. He completed a Master of Philosophy in Medical Law and Ethics at the University of Glasgow (2002), followed by a second MPhil research degree at the University of Queensland, where his research centered on skin surgery, biomechanics, and the anatomical principles that underpin skin tension lines.

== Career ==
Paul began his academic career in 1996 as a Senior Lecturer at the University of Auckland, where he developed courses in skin cancer and dermatologic surgery for primary care doctors. In 2005, he joined the School of Medicine at the University of Queensland with a focus on skin cancer surgery in primary care. In 2016, he became an Adjunct Professor at Auckland University of Technology (AUT), where he contributes to interdisciplinary and translational research bridging design, technology, bioengineering, skin biomedical science and personalized healthcare.

== Philanthropy ==
Paul established the Baci Group, which included a bookstore (Baci Lounge), and the Baci Foundation—a charitable initiative focused on literacy and health projects.

In 2017, Paul created a mobile library classroom under his charitable foundation, the Baci Foundation, a free nonprofit initiative, which provides literacy and mentoring programmes to the disadvantaged children. He also funded literacy programmes in schools with his venture Baci Lounge.
