= Zhong Kui: Snow Girl and the Dark Crystal =

2015 Chinese-Hong Kong-American film by Peter Pau and Zhao Tianyu

- Theatrical release poster
- Traditional Chinese: 鐘馗伏魔：雪妖魔靈
- Simplified Chinese: 钟馗伏魔：雪妖魔灵
- Literal meaning: Zhong Kui demon palace: snow demon spirit
- Hanyu Pinyin: Zhōngkuí fú mó: Xuě yāomó líng
- Directed by: Peter Pau; Zhao Tianyu
- Written by: Gao Junli; Jin Lei; Zhang Huanhuan
- Produced by: Ann An
- Starring: Chen Kun; Li Bingbing; Winston Chao; Yang Zishan; Bao Bei'er; Jike Junyi
- Cinematography: Peter Pau
- Edited by: David Wu
- Music by: Javier Navarrete
- Production companies: Village Roadshow Pictures Asia; Warner Bros. Pictures; Beijing Enlight Pictures; Desen International Media; K. Pictures; Shenzhen Wus Entertainment
- Distributed by: Desen International Media (China); Well Go USA Entertainment (United States); Warner Bros. Pictures (Hong Kong)
- Release dates: February 19, 2015 (China); March 12, 2015 (Hong Kong)
- Running time: 118 minutes
- Countries: China; Hong Kong; United States
- Language: Mandarin
- Budget: US$30 million
- Box office: US$64.4 million (China)

Zhong Kui: Snow Girl and the Dark Crystal (Chinese: 钟馗伏魔：雪妖魔灵; sometimes marketed in the US as simply Snow Girl and the Dark Crystal) is a 2015 3D fantasy action adventure film directed by Peter Pau and Zhao Tianyu and starring Chen Kun, Li Bingbing, Winston Chao, Yang Zishan, Bao Bei'er, and Jike Junyi. Production began on February 16, 2014. The film was released on February 19, 2015.

== Summary ==
Chinese anti-hero Zhong Kui is set up by deity Zhang Diaoxian to steal a supremely powerful gem- known as "the Dark Crystal"- and purge the Chinese city of Hu from demons, until he discovers that his lost love Snow Girl has also been consigned to Hell. Kui begins to question his true allegiance, and discovers that nothing is what it seems. To reclaim what he had lost, he will have to traverse Earth, Heaven, and Hell to find answers.

== Plot ==
After achieving lesser godhood, Zhang Diaoxian decides that isn't enough. He assumes control over the city of Hu, getting the locals to worship his every word. It is later revealed that not every demon in Hell is deserving of their fate nor their status, and that the lesser ones want redemption for themselves rather than harm to humanity, but must play along to avoid Diaoxian's zealot demon-slayers. Zhong Kui, a local scholar, is manipulated by Diaoxian into becoming his most powerful experiment yet: a pseudo-demon capable of more effectively slaying demons with. Diaoxian wins the trust of Hu's residents in order to deceive them and the other gods into not noticing his real plans for wishing to steal away from Hell one of its most prized treasures: the Dark Crystal. With it, he seeks to overthrow the pantheon of gods and rewrite all reality - even if he has to eradicate Hell and erase the souls of all the innocent in Hu to make that possible.

The current resident "Demon King" in the realm of Hell nearest to the city of Hu is revealed to have once been one of Diaoxian's pawns, much like Kui is presently. After Diaoxian's betrayal led to the Demon King and his followers being turned into demons and sent to Hell as Diaoxian sought to hide his crimes from the other gods; the Demon King sought to take advantage of a date when the realms were close by and reincarnations occurred as his big chance to win redemption for his clan by using the Dark Crystal to expose Diaoxian.

Three years prior, a snow demon named "Little Snow," stumbled upon a younger Kui in an effort to seduce him, but was soon smitten with him herself and lost some of her zeal for revenge. However, she was heartbroken when Kui said that humans and demons do not belong together, and left him to return to Hell. Subsequent to her departure, Kui took part in the imperial exams and obtained the highest honours. However, this was stripped away from him due to bribery and he died by suicide due to the injustice. Daoxian brought Kui back to life and him gave a magic elixir to make him believe he was still fully human and alive, rather than a human-demon hybrid per an unholy resurrection.

Three years later, Kui tries to master his new power of a "pseudo-demon" form. He also steals the Dark Crystal from Hell on Daoxian's command. The Demon King recruits his subjects - along with some actual demons - to wage assault on the city of Hu and take the Dark Crystal back, fearing that Diaoxian's true evil plan will finally come to pass otherwise. When the initial waves of actual demons prove too weak and animalistic and fall too easily to the demon slayers, the Demon King revives Snow Girl to assist his subjects in retrieving the Dark Crystal.

The Demon Sisters travel to Hu disguised as traveling dancers, to bemuse the town into drunken revelry and lust so they will be too distracted to help Diaoxian guard the crystal properly. However, a suspicious Kui feigns being drunk in order to get closer to the girls, in a quest to get them to betray their demon forms. When his initial efforts to expose them fail, he discovers Snow separated from the others. The two of them reignite their love affair, as she attempts to explain to him the truth of what's happening. Their lovemaking session is interrupted after the other girls grow impatient and try to steal the crystal without her, causing a mystical fox guardian to attack them. Kui hears the commotion and leaves to investigate. Snow arrives on the scene afterward to help her sisters out, and comes across Kui in his demon form, the two of them confused to find themselves fighting on opposite sides. They trade blows, but Diaoxian arrives and the demon girls are defeated. Snow tries to escape and feign innocence, but Kui isn't fooled. Realizing she went out of her way not to hurt anyone except in self-defense, Kui gives in to both his love for Snow and to her pleading for mercy, and decides he can't bring himself to kill her. Instead, he has her hide with his siblings.

Diaoxian fears the girls might betray the truth to the residents of Hu, so he stirs up hatred against them and tries to orchestrate a public execution to send them back to Hell, in a weakened state where it could take centuries before they are strong enough to return to Earth. Snow hears her sisters being publicly tortured, so she heads out in public to rescue them. By herself, she proves no match for Diaoxian, who quickly defeats her and exposes her in public. Diaoxian demands that Kui execute Snow publicly for the crime of humiliating him with icicles. However, Kui refuses to kill her, instead pleading for her life. Diaoxian responds by stabbing Kui with a blade. More of the Demon King's forces advance in an effort to rescue Snow and Kui, with Kui's demon form able to understand the intentions of the demon girls and his loyalties shifting following his disillusionment with Diaoxian's cruel and merciless demeanor. He allows the Demon King to return to Hell and draws Daoxian's ire. She and her sisters meet up with Kui later, healing his condition with some stolen elixir. Kui agrees to go to Hell with them and meet up with the Demon King to learn the truth.

Kui then goes to confront Diaoxian, learning even more the true nature of his former master. He threatens to expose Diaoxian's evil plan to the townsfolk, but learns the hard way that Diaoxian's deceptions have the town completely under his spell. The townsfolk turn against Kui, beating him until he becomes enraged and his demon form manifests. Even then, he refuses to attack his countrymen - except as a last resort in self-defense. A bitter, wounded, betrayed Kui flees to the outskirts of the realms in an effort to make sense of his broken reality, with Snow chasing after him to comfort him and remind him of their love.

The two of them decide to stage a final assault on Diaoxian in order to separate him from the Dark Crystal, so that the balance of reality can be restored and the residents of Hu saved from being the fuel to Diaoxian's reality-warping engine. The city's royal guard interferes, slowing Kui down as he's forced to fight his former demon-slayer comrades and overcome them. Snow tackles Diaoxian by herself, openly chastising him for his never-ending treachery. However, the fight goes poorly for her. He is able to imprison her in a crystalline structure suspended in the air, significantly weakening her life force so that she'll need to reincarnate in Hell before gaining another chance at redemption centuries later, possibly dooming her to go through numerous reincarnations as a pseudo-demon before transcending to human - or godhood.

Kui catches up and notices Snow's predicament. He seems stunned and helpless at first, but flies into a rage when Diaoxian mocks the lovers' commitment to each other. Diaoxian soon discovers that he exhausted much of his own energy supply trying to imprison Snow Girl, then exhausts what's left trying to create an energy pyramid to shield himself from an enraged Zhong Kui in full demon form. Kui, finally fed up, uses his hidden sword to shatter the compromised shield, leaving a weakened Diaoxian exposed and vulnerable. Kui slices Diaoxian into four pieces, seemingly killing him. This causes the crystal imprisoning Snow to disintegrate, sending her falling to the ground. Kui catches her, but she is too weak. Dying and in pain, she retreats in spirit form to Hell to recuperate. However, the July 15th special event is nearly at an end. If Kui doesn't save her from Hell in time, it could be thousands of years before her next reincarnation can hope to escape demon life. Kui restores the chi spirits of the townsfolk stolen by Diaoxian with the Dark Crystal's help, and the disillusioned townsfolk realize that Kui was right to rebel against Diaoxian.

As Kui replaces the Dark Crystal in its rightful place, the Jade Emperor appears and beckons Kui to reincarnate as the Heavens still need him. The movie ends with Kui plunging into the depths of Hell, presumably reincarnating.

== Cast ==
- Chen Kun as Zhong Kui, the story's central conflicted anti-hero protagonist whose sense of moral right and wrong is challenged after a series of betrayals. He also lends his talents at times to playing the Demon King's true form, an androgynous being in white makeup plotting revenge against Zhang Diaoxian.
- Li Bingbing as Snow Girl / Little Snow, a human-demon hybrid doomed to servitude to Hell from birth, seeking redemption as well as revenge against the deity that betrayed her master. Falling in love with Kui reshapes her and everyone else's fates, for better or worse.
- Winston Chao as Zhang Diaoxian, an Antagonist lesser Chinese deity who's not what he seems, but has the entire city of Hu under his control.
- Yang Zishan as Zhong Ling, Kui's supportive younger sister.
- Bao Bei'er as Du Ping, Ling's ambitious fiancé and the source of much comic relief for the film.
- Jike Junyi as Wei Yi
- Ren Jiao as Green Snake
- Peter Pau as God-of-Heaven (Shen Di?), a higher-form god, one of many that Diaoxian is jealous of.
- Choenyi Tsering, Liu Angi, Chen Yun, and others as various demon girls.

== Production ==
=== Music ===
The musical score and soundtrack for this film were put together by Spanish film composer Javier Navarrete. He comments in the film's bonus features on the DVD release that it was his "first, and possibly only, Chinese film." The soundtrack was released separately for purchase as an audio CD via Lakeshore Records on April 7 of 2015.

== Reception ==
The film has received mixed reviews, with the character chemistry and music being praised and the visual effects being widely criticized as being sub-par for a release of its time. The writing, mythology, and pacing are also often quoted as being confusing to casual viewers. James Marsh of Screen Anarchy describes these shortcomings by stating:

... [The problem is] the character work - particularly on the underworld creatures and Zhong's own demonic "beast mode" form - provided by Macrograph and Pixomondo where the production lacks the level of photo-realism international audiences demand these days, often resembling dated arcade game level graphics. Nevertheless, Pau's experience with the camera wins out, and the film always manages to look visually interesting, even when the effects let it down.

Maggie Lee of Variety praised the film for its willingness to subvert audience expectations regarding its invocation of Chinese fantasy action film cliches; yet she questioned the portrayal of Bingbing Li's performance of Snow Girl as "like a highly sexualized version of Elsa with a subtly insinuating Maleficent streak."
