= Jane and the Dragon (TV series) =

Television series

- Genre: Children's television series; Fantasy comedy
- Based on: Jane and the Dragon by Martin Baynton
- Developed by: Martin Baynton; Ross Hastings
- Written by: Martin Baynton; Steven Sullivan; Michael Stokes; Terri Baynton; Hugh Duffy; Ross Hastings; Jeff Schechter; Richard Elliott; Carolyn Hay; Simon Racioppa
- Directed by: Mike Fallows; Theo Baynton
- Voices of: Tajja Isen; Adrian Truss; Noah Reid; Ben Campbell; Mark Rendall; Sunday Muse; Alex House; Aron Tager; Will Bowes
- Theme music composer: Martin Kucaj
- Composers: Geoff Bennett; Andre Hirz; Ben Johannesen
- Countries of origin: Canada; New Zealand
- Original language: English
- No. of seasons: 1
- No. of episodes: 26

Production
- Executive producers: Martin Baynton; Scott Dyer; Michael McNeil; Doug Murphy; Richard Taylor
- Production location: England
- Editor: Annellie Rose Samuel
- Running time: 23 minutes
- Production companies: Nelvana Limited; Wētā Productions Limited

Original release
- Network: YTV
- Release: October 15, 2005 – August 12, 2006

This page refers to the television series. For the book series, see "Jane and the Dragon."

Jane and the Dragon is a children's animated television series based on the books of the same name by Martin Baynton. The show is directed by Mike Fallows and the performance capture is directed by Peter Salmon; it is co-produced by Wētā Workshop (as Wētā Productions) in New Zealand and Nelvana in Canada. The series follows the comedic exploits of Jane—an adolescent girl training to be a knight—and her friend Dragon—a talking, flying, 300-year-old, fire-breathing dragon. The program originally aired on YTV in Canada and on ABC in Australia. It also aired on the Qubo weekend lineup from September 9, 2006 (four weeks after its cancellation) until 2021, when the network shut down. It can be seen on Five in the UK. In American broadcasts, it bears the E/I bug. Episodes are available as part of the "Kids Suite" sold via Bell/Rogers in Canada and are broadcast on Tuesdays on Disney Junior on the Disney Channel. It has also been on Treehouse TV.

== Plot ==
Jane is a redhead 12-year-old adolescent girl who lives in a small fictional kingdom called Kippernium located in southern England. Jane was being trained to become a lady-in-waiting but had always dreamed of becoming a knight. When the prince is taken by a dragon, Jane sets out to defeat the beast. When Jane brings the prince back, the king makes her a knight apprentice. Jane and the dragon end up becoming best friends. Further details of this early adventure are never explained in the series. They are, however, explained in detail in the book Jane and the Dragon by Martin Baynton. The series follows Jane's interactions with the rest of the castle's residents and their frequent adventures. Themes of integrity, loyalty, friendship, and courage are woven through the stories. Jane frequently makes errors in judgment, but every episode ends happily. As a knight apprentice, Jane trains and performs various tasks and duties around the castle. Her master is wise Sir Theodore. Sir Ivon, a valiant but somewhat comical knight, has an apprentice of his own named Gunther, a boy whose integrity seems outwardly questionable and whom Jane views as a rival. Dragon helps Jane as she trains to become a knight. When she is on patrol duty, he lets her ride on his back as he flies around the kingdom. Jane, in turn, helps Dragon, who is an orphan, in his efforts to uncover the secrets of his ancestry. In addition to Dragon, Jane has several other friends among the castle staff. Jester the royal jester, Pepper the castle cook and Rake the castle gardener are all about Jane's age. She is also friends with Smithy, the castle blacksmith and stable hand. Also residing in the castle are the King and Queen, their two children, Jane's parents and the wizard. The only non-resident of the castle seen is Gunther's father, a merchant who has regular dealings with Jane's father and the king. No other characters are seen or heard in the series. The wizard is never seen but he lives in a tower, in the far corner of the Royal Gardens near the castle. He is seemingly knowledgeable in alchemy. The younger members of the castle staff appear to be afraid of him, for some reason. While hoping to preserve verisimilitude in its portrait of the earthy characters inhabiting a medieval castle Baynton engineered into his depiction substitute swear words to avoid controversy with parents. Jane is prone to exclaiming "Maggots!" when frustrated or exasperated. In this manner the series taps into the imagination of children, encouraging them to find their own expressions that can be much more fun and creative and colourful than conventional profanity without being offensive.

== Characters ==
The characters were voice-acted (in English) by the Canadian actors credited below and physically performed and performance-captured by a team of five actors at Weta Productions in New Zealand.

- Jane Turnkey (voiced by Tajja Isen, performance-captured by Angela Green) – A 12-year-old girl and the daughter of the King's chamberlain and the Queen's lady-in-waiting. She found her life as a future lady-in-waiting to be boring and wanted to become a knight and experience adventure. When she heard that the King's son Cuthbert had been kidnapped by a dragon, she set out to rescue him and kill the dragon. However, upon meeting the dragon Jane befriended him instead. Her courage in rescuing the prince led the King to make Jane a knight's apprentice. Jane wields a special sword, which she found in Dragon's cave. It is made of special metals and was forged using dragon fire. Its unique properties make it capable of piercing dragon skin. The sword's hilt also doubles as a removable whistle, which lets out a sound that Dragon can hear from great distances.
  - Cleva – Jane's horse.
- Milton Turnkey (voiced by Ben Campbell, performance-captured by Aaron Alexander) – A royal chamberlain and Jane's father. The son of a knight, his father died in battle defending the castle. He oversees all of the kingdom's finances and negotiates trade deals with the surrounding kingdoms. Milton is overprotective of Jane at times, and is generally supportive of Jane's efforts at knighthood and helps both her and Dragon when the need arises.
- Adeline Turnkey (née d'Ark) (voiced by Jill Frappier) – The queen's Lady-in-Waiting, as well as Jane's mother. She was born in the year 776 to Sir John d'Ark, the First Knight of the King. She has concerns over Jane's plan to become a knight and does not always approve of the influence that Dragon seems to have over her. Adeline also opposes some of Jane's tomboyish looks and behaviors, to the point that she forbids Jane from attending a royal ball unless she wears a dress, for fear of embarrassment.
- Dragon (voiced by Adrian Truss) – A dragon who is estimated to be 200 to 300 years old. When he was young, Dragon was orphaned, forcing him to teach himself how to fly and survive on his own. Dragon was later captured by humans and kept as a pet and was traded many times before escaping. After many years, he set out to discover more about the history of dragons. Dragon saw a rune in the dragon language on his cave wall that had been left by his father many centuries before and indicated a child. Dragon kidnapped Prince Cuthbert, believing that he was the child and could help him uncover what happened to the other dragons (who had long since vanished). Jane journeyed to rescue Cuthbert, but learned that Dragon was friendly and brought Cuthbert home safely without anyone being harmed.
- Jester (voiced by Mark Rendall, performance-captured by Aaron Alexander)–The 14-year-old jester of the king's royal court. He was left at the castle at the age of 7 by his parents, who thought it was best for him. He is not paid for his services, but receives free education and housing. Jester, whose real name he keeps a secret, is generous and possesses an excellent memory and a quick wit.
- Jethro "Smithy" Junior (voiced by Alex House, performance-captured by David Hoskins) – The 14-year-old castle blacksmith/stable hand. He keeps the horses shod, the swords sharp and the armor in good shape. He has invented many labor-saving devices for the castle. He also has a way with animals, a calm confidence that all creatures seem to respond to. Smithy is calm, caring and quiet. He is also the most mature of Jane's friends and always keeps his head in an emergency.
  - Pig – Smithy's pet pig. She often runs in a wheel that pumps the bellows for his fire.
- Verbena "Pepper" Salter (voiced by Sunday Muse, performance-captured by Ban Abdul) – The 12-year-old castle cook. Her parents work at salting herring and they took her to the castle to find better work for her. As a cook, she works long hours in the royal kitchens and is rarely able to go outside.
- Drake "Rake" Gardener Junior (voiced by Will Seatle Bowes, performance-captured by Nick Blake) – The 13-year-old royal gardener. He is introverted and deeply devoted to his craft. His gardening talents are displayed in the topiary of the Royal Garden, although he seems to spend more time growing foodstuffs than maintaining ornamental plants. He also has his own compost pile, which he maintains by himself. He has rarely been outside the castle walls or even to the higher places within the castle.
- Gunther Breech (voiced by Noah Reid, performance-captured by David Hoskins) – A 14-year-old loner who struggles to balance his loyalty to his merchant father and his loyalty to the knight's code of honor. Gunther's father, Magnus, believes that being a knight is simply about being a good swordsman and has no problem with coercing Gunther into dishonorable activities. These situations reveal Gunther's greatest strength: his quick and resourceful thinking. Gunther often manages to resolve the sticky situations his father creates without damaging his reputation. Gunther is secretly jealous of Jane and the two of them are in constant competition for which of the two is the better knight in training.
- Magnus Breech (voiced by Clive Walton, performance-captured by Aaron Alexander) – A 41-year-old wealthy merchant who is also Gunther's father. He is greedy and does things such as making a fake dragon egg and having Gunther steal a dragon's tooth just to get money. He hates Dragon and is always trying to get him to leave the kingdom, one way or another. His family is not well thought of in the kingdom, as they started their fortune by trading with enemy forces when the castle was under siege two generations ago.
- King Caradoc (voiced by Juan Chioran, performance-captured by Nick Blake) – The 30-year-old king. He means well, but has little patience for the affairs of state (though he is concerned for his subjects and will listen to their concerns openly). He much prefers hunting, fishing and dancing—a lifestyle that has put a considerable financial strain on the kingdom. He also loves cabbage. Originally named Rathbonne, Caradoc assumed the name of his late older brother to keep his legacy alive.
- Queen Gwendolyn (voiced by Alex Belcourt)–The 28-year-old queen who came from another kingdom called Scandinavia. She is the daughter of a noble family and came to England on a business trip with her father, where she eventually fell in love with and married king Caradoc. Gwendolyn is very conscious of how other people view her and feels the pressures of being expected to be beautiful and ladylike since she is the queen.
- Prince Cuthbert (voiced by Cameron Ansell, performance-captured by David Hoskins) – The 8-year-old heir apparent of the kingdom. Born a sickly child, he is pampered and doted on by his parents as well as the court staff. A rather selfish child, he tends to take what he wants and is hard to impress. Cuthbert usually thinks about short-term goals; he is focused on avoiding work and enjoying food, but he also desires his parents to be proud of him. Prior to the start of the series, Cuthbert was captured by Dragon, which led to Dragon meeting Jane.
- Princess Lavinia (voiced by Isabel De Carteret, performance-captured by Ban Abdul) – The 6-year-old younger sister of Prince Cuthbert who looks up to Jane as a true hero. She sometimes dreams of becoming a knight like Jane and will often pay more heed to Jane than she will to her parents. She enjoys playing games, looking through Rake's garden and hearing stories. She loves everyone around her and like her brother, also has a soft spot for animals and finds hunting to be a rather poor and cruel sport.
- Sir Theodore Boarmaster (voiced by Aron Tager, performance-captured by Nick Blake) – A 66-year-old wise knight who, as Jane's mentor, displays patience and understanding. He was best friends with Jane's maternal grandfather, who was also a knight and died in battle protecting the castle. His family comes from a long line of dragonslayers, which is revealed one day when Jane stumbles upon his family's broken ancestral sword, hidden in his supplies chest. When confronted with his family's past actions, Theodore begs for Dragon's forgiveness. Dragon shows that all is forgiven by destroying Theodore's sword.
  - Augustus – Sir Theodore's horse.
  - Trencher – Sir Theodore's trained falcon.
- Sir Ivon Mackay (voiced by Ben Campbell, performance-captured by David Hoskins) – The 44-year-old loud, enthusiastic, short-tempered mentor to Gunther. He has a deep love of weapons of any kind, from swords and axes to the fearsome chopping-machines he invents himself. None of the gadgets he invents have been shown to work too well and generally backfire.

== Episodes ==
| No. | Title | Original release date |
|---|---|---|
| 1 | "Tests and Jests" | January 8, 2006 |
Jane has her knight-in-training 'rescue the damsel' test. It is a difficult challenge that she must meet in order to carry on her apprenticeship as a knight. If Jane fails, she must sacrifice her bid to become a knight and face her fear of a future in the kitchens. The arranged marriage between the king and the queen is revealed.
| 2 | "The Tooth Fairy" | January 15, 2006 |
Dragon has a sore tooth and decides to have the tooth pulled only after hearing Jane’s tooth fairy story.
| 3 | "Jester Justice" | January 22, 2006 |
Jester’s hysterical impression of Ivon leads to a face-saving duel. Jane is mortified, Jester is terrified and Jane's efforts to save her friend from public doom seem, well... doomed.
| 4 | "A Dragon's Tail" | January 29, 2006 |
Dragon comes down with a case of curly tail and it is up to Jane and Gunther to save him.
| 5 | "Shall We Dance" | January 29, 2006 |
Gunther insists that Jane isn’t good enough to become a real knight and Jane is determined to prove him wrong-- so much so, in fact, that she misses the Annual Ball and sets about trying to capture a flower thief.
| 6 | "The Offer" | February 5, 2006 |
Jane rushes to defend her friend Dragon, whose clumsiness is causing many problems around the castle, by concocting a story and lets her friends know that she and Dragon have received an offer to move to a castle where they love dragons.
| 7 | "Dragon Rules" | February 19, 2006 |
On their day off, Jane and her friends have the chance to play bandyball. Dragon joins in the game, but it ends in disaster. Jane manages to get the others to involve Dragon as referee, but playing a physical and noisy game like bandyball without disturbing the King is extremely tricky.
| 8 | "All Fools Day" | February 26, 2006 |
Jester's favorite day of the year, All Fools Day, is here, but a jealous Dragon threatens to ruin the fun with his terribly unfunny pranks. Jane is determined to pull a prank on Dragon, but he proves to be a very difficult target. There is an interesting twist at the end of this episode.
| 9 | "Dragon Diva" | March 5, 2006 |
Jester is the King’s best hope for winning the inter-kingdom competition of song. However, Jane’s overenthusiastic coaching results in Jester losing his voice. Hope is rekindled when Jane overhears a talented voice, but there is one problem: she cannot find the singer.
| 10 | "Adventures in Royal Babysitting" | March 12, 2006 |
When the King and Queen are gone for the day on royal business, Jane is entrusted with "protecting the royal heirs." Unfortunately, babysitting the bratty Prince and playful Princess wreaks havoc on Jane’s plan to study for one of Sir Theodore’s knighthood tests.
| 11 | "Three's a Crowd" | March 19, 2006 |
When Gunther pulls a practical joke on Jane, Dragon discovers he and Gunther share a similar sense of humor: lowbrow. Jane begins to feel left out, so she enlists Jester to give her a crash course on crass humor.
| 12 | "A Pig of a Problem" | March 26, 2006 |
When Smithy's pig bites the Prince, the King decides that Pig must be tethered. Smithy is devastated, as Pig is his pet and friend. When the King sells Pig to the merchant, Smithy's problems multiply.
| 13 | "A Thing of Beauty" | April 2, 2006 |
The King commissions a beautiful portrait of the Queen and Jane is entrusted to guard it before the grand unveiling gala. When Jane leaves her post to check in on Dragon, the Queen's portrait is left unattended, leaving Jane in big trouble.
| 14 | "Rune" | April 9, 2006 |
With the 300th anniversary of the castle approaching, Jane and Gunther are given an important chore to prepare for the Royal Jubilee. Whichever squire polishes more of the castle's myriad of shields will win the honor of carrying the banner in the Jubilee Parade. At the same time, Dragon wants Jane to come to his cave to help him decipher the carvings on his wall.
| 15 | "Foul Weather Friends" | April 23, 2006 |
While out on patrol, Dragon's spontaneous loop-de-loop causes Jane to slip off and free-fall through the air. Dragon manages to save her in the nick of time, but is shaken by the experience. He vows that no harm will come to her and becomes something of an overprotective parent. Jane rebels against his suffocating affection and unlocks one of the secrets of her runic sword.
| 16 | "Dragonphobia" | May 7, 2006 |
When Jane eats some berries and passes out ill, she reawakens with amnesia thinking she is still a Lady-in-waiting. Jane now knows only one thing is for certain; she is terrified of Dragon.
| 17 | "Pride and Pollen" | May 14, 2006 |
The scheming Merchant concocts a plan to get rid of Dragon once and for all.
| 18 | "Knight Light" | May 21, 2006 |
When Jane finds herself trapped in the privy at night, with no candle and a squeaky bat, she develops a sudden fear of the dark, so she has a set of candles in her room to feel safe. To make matters worse, Sir Ivon and Sir Theodore have built a hedge maze outside the castle, which Jane and Gunther must navigate at night. Princess Lavinia gets lost inside it while the wolves are hunting, leaving Jane to face her fears to save the day.
| 19 | "Fathers" | May 21, 2006 |
An adventure in a newly discovered underground chamber allows Jane and Dragon to learn a little more about each of their fathers.
| 20 | "Strawberry Fool" | May 28, 2006 |
When Princess Lavinia comes down with a cold, the King puts Jane in charge to cheer her up, but one by one, Jane's elaborate plans go awry.
| 21 | "Go West Young Gardener" | June 4, 2006 |
When Jane finds out that the King is bored with Pepper's cooking and that Rake has never traveled far beyond the castle, she figures that she can solve two problems with one Dragon flight.
| 22 | "Mismatched" | July 16, 2006 |
When Jane and Gunther get out of hand, Sir Theodore decides to settle their differences in the sparring arena. But when Pepper mistakes Gunther taking Jane's sword for a romance instead of courting, things start to get complicated. In this episode, Jester reveals his jealousy at the possibility that Jane and Gunther might be sweethearts.
| 23 | "Dragon's Egg" | July 22, 2006 |
The Merchant's new consignment of supplies contains an incredible object-- a dragon's egg.
| 24 | "King's Knight" | July 29, 2006 |
It is a proud day for Jane, as the squires and knights must make their annual pledge of allegiance to the King. The day gets more exciting when Jane and Jester find a map of the catacombs and set off on a mission to find what they hope is treasure. Instead, however, they stumble upon a terrible tomb.
| 25 | "The Last of the Dragonslayers" | August 5, 2006 |
When Sir Theodore assigns Jane the menial task of cleaning his sword, Gunther gloats over getting the easier task of Sentry duty. Dragon accuses Theodore of playing favorites, but Jane defends her mentor-- that is, until she discovers a broken sword in Sir Theodore's quarters with mysterious runes on its hilt.
| 26 | "For Crying Out Loud" | August 12, 2006 |
Jane tries to master her poorly done battle cry to call out above the din of battle. Meanwhile, the royal boar hunt is on and the squires are invited to join. Dragon cannot believe that Jane will not stand up for the defenseless boar.

== Awards and nominations ==
The show was nominated for an Annie Award for Best Animated Television Production in 2007.

== Reception ==
Andrea Graham of Common Sense Media gave it 5 out of 5 stars and called it "a soaring delight." Graham also wrote: "With its lovable characters, engaging story lines, and wit reminiscent of the Shrek series, Jane and the Dragon may capture the attention of the entire family."
