= Tibet University =

Public university in Lhasa, Tibet, China

Coordinates: 29.64590°N 91.14541°E

- 西藏大学
- Motto: 团结，勤奋，求实，创新
- Motto in English: United, Diligent, Realistic, Innovative
- Type: Public
- Established: 1985; 41 years ago
- President: Jin Yongbing (金永兵)
- Party Secretary: Nima Tsering (尼玛次仁)
- Administrative staff: 1,119
- Students: 10,685
- Undergraduates: 9,417
- Postgraduates: 1,268
- Location: Lhasa, Tibet, China
- Campus: Urban; 4 campuses
- Website: www.utibet.edu.cn

Tibet University

Chinese name
- Simplified Chinese: 西藏大学
- Traditional Chinese: 西藏大學
Transcriptions
Standard Mandarin
- Hanyu Pinyin: Xīzàng dàxué

Tibetan name
- Tibetan: བོད་ལྗོངས་སློབ་གྲྭ་ཆེན་མོ་
Transcriptions
- Wylie: bod ljongs slob gra chen mo
- Tibetan Pinyin: Poijong Lobcha Qênmo

Tibet University (UTibet; Chinese: 西藏大学; lit. 'University of Tibet') is a regional public university in Lhasa, Tibet, China. It is affiliated with the Tibet Autonomous Region and co-funded by the regional government and the Ministry of Education. The university is part of Project 211 and the Double First-Class Construction.

The university is one of China's national key universities and the largest university in the Tibet Autonomous Region. With an internationally renowned department of Tibetan studies and a majority ethnic Tibetan student body, the university maintains a focus on local communities and cultures.

The school has four campuses in Lhasa: Na Jin campus, He Ba Lin campus, Financial School campus, and Medical School campus.

== History ==
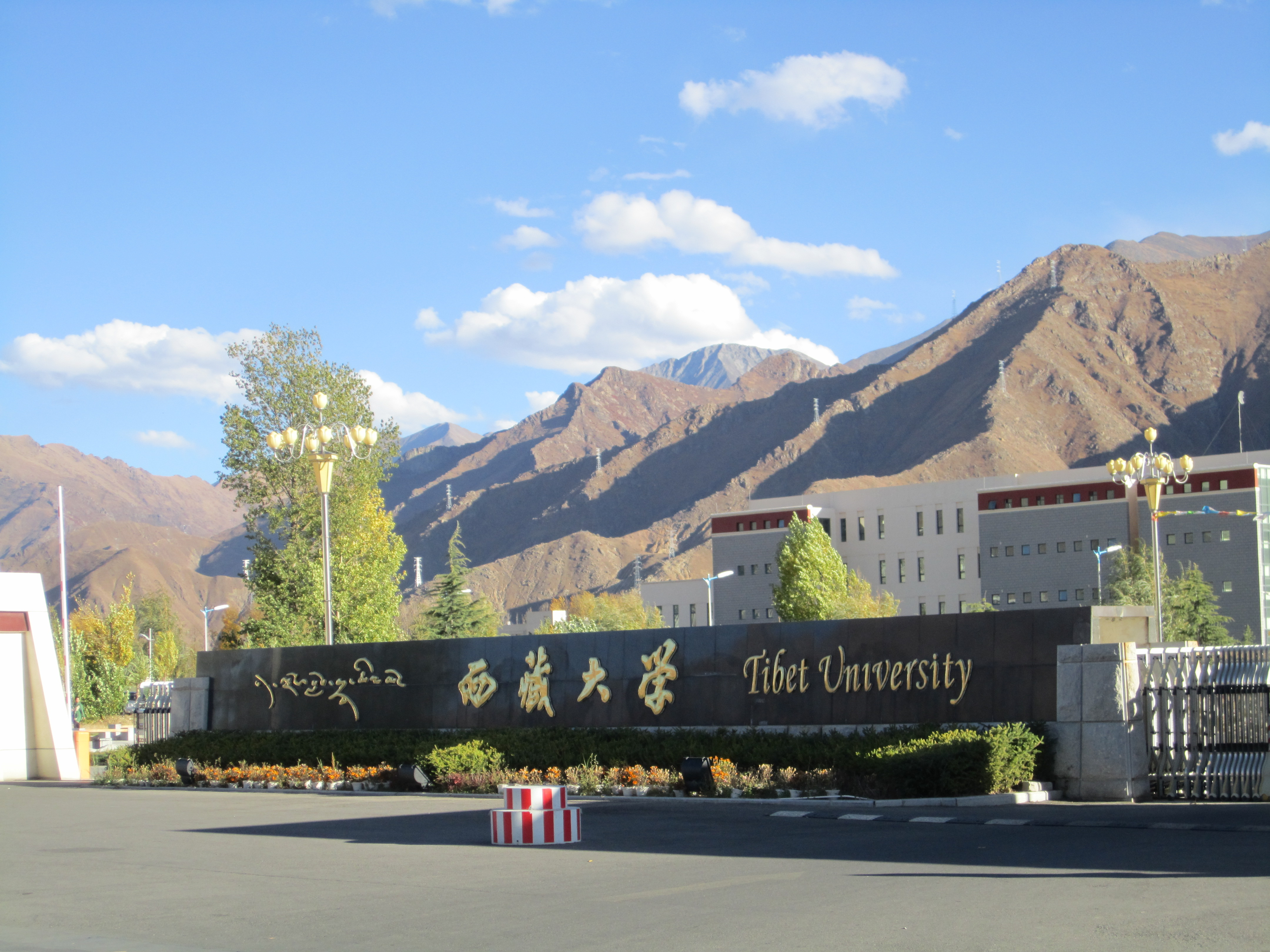
Gateway of Tibet University (2011)

The precursors to Tibet University were informal classes established by Tibet Military District Cadre School in 1951. In 1956, the school was renamed the Tibet Local Cadre School. In 1961, the Tibetan Administrative Cadre School was established on the basis of the former Tibetan Local Cadre School, with Ngapoi Ngawang Jigme as its principal, and in October 1965, the school was renamed the Tibetan Teacher Training School, with 755 children of farmers and herdsmen enrolled in the following year. In 1975, the school was transformed into the Tibetan Teacher Training College, with departments of political science and language, mathematics and physics, and arts and physical education. In 1982, the Department of Tibetan Language was merged to the school.

In May 1983, the State Council of the People's Republic of China officially approved the creation of the University of Tibet on the basis of the existing Teachers College in Lhasa. Tibet University was formally established on 20 July 1985, as one of 43 Aid Projects to Tibet. By 1989, it had eight departments of Tibetan language and literature, language, political history, art, Tibetan medicine, mathematics and science, chemistry, biology, economics and management, as well as a Tibetan language training department.

Since 1999, various institutions of higher education, including the art school of the Tibet Autonomous Region, the Tibet Medical College, the Medical Department of the Tibet Institute for Nationalities and the Tibet Autonomous Region Finance School have all been incorporated into Tibet University, giving it a more rounded profile of academic departments. In March 2001, with the approval of the Ministry of Education, Tibet University and Tibet College of Agriculture and Animal Husbandry merged to form a new Tibet University.

In December 2008, Tibet University was selected as a beneficiary of the national Project 211. In 2017, the university was included by the central government of China in the Double First Class University Plan, with Double First Class University identity.

== Student life ==
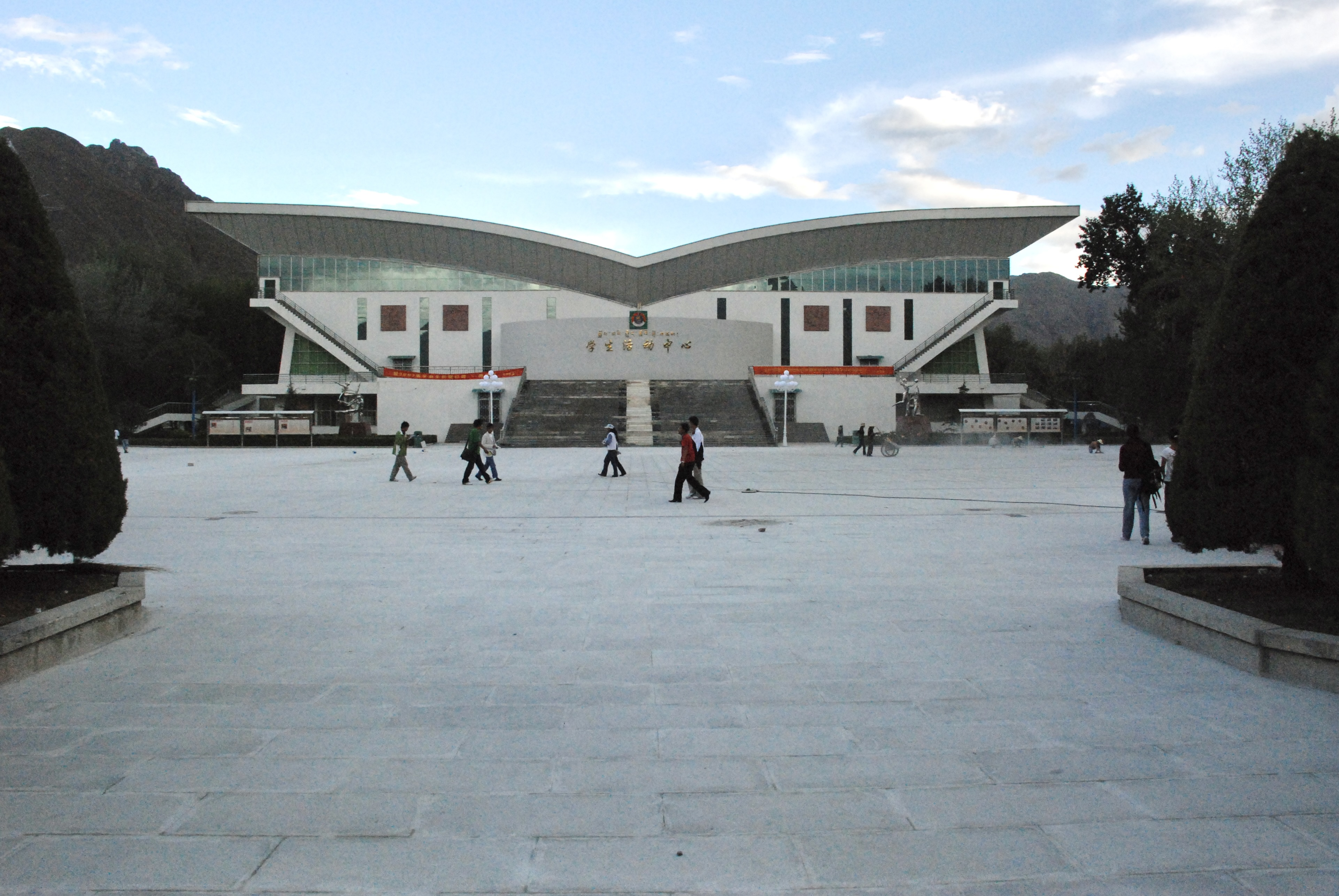
Tibet University Auditorium (2007)

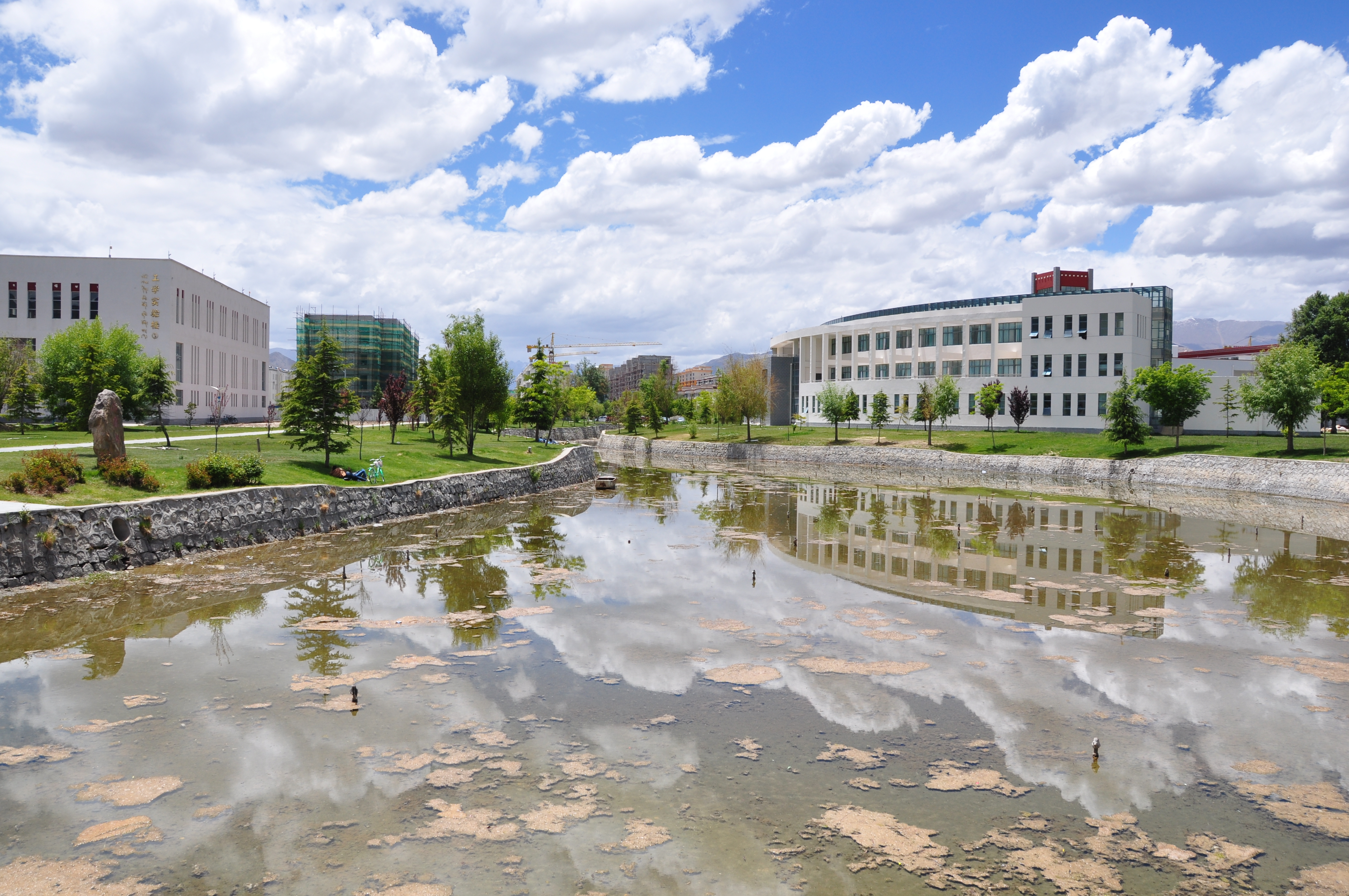
Tibet University Campus (2016)

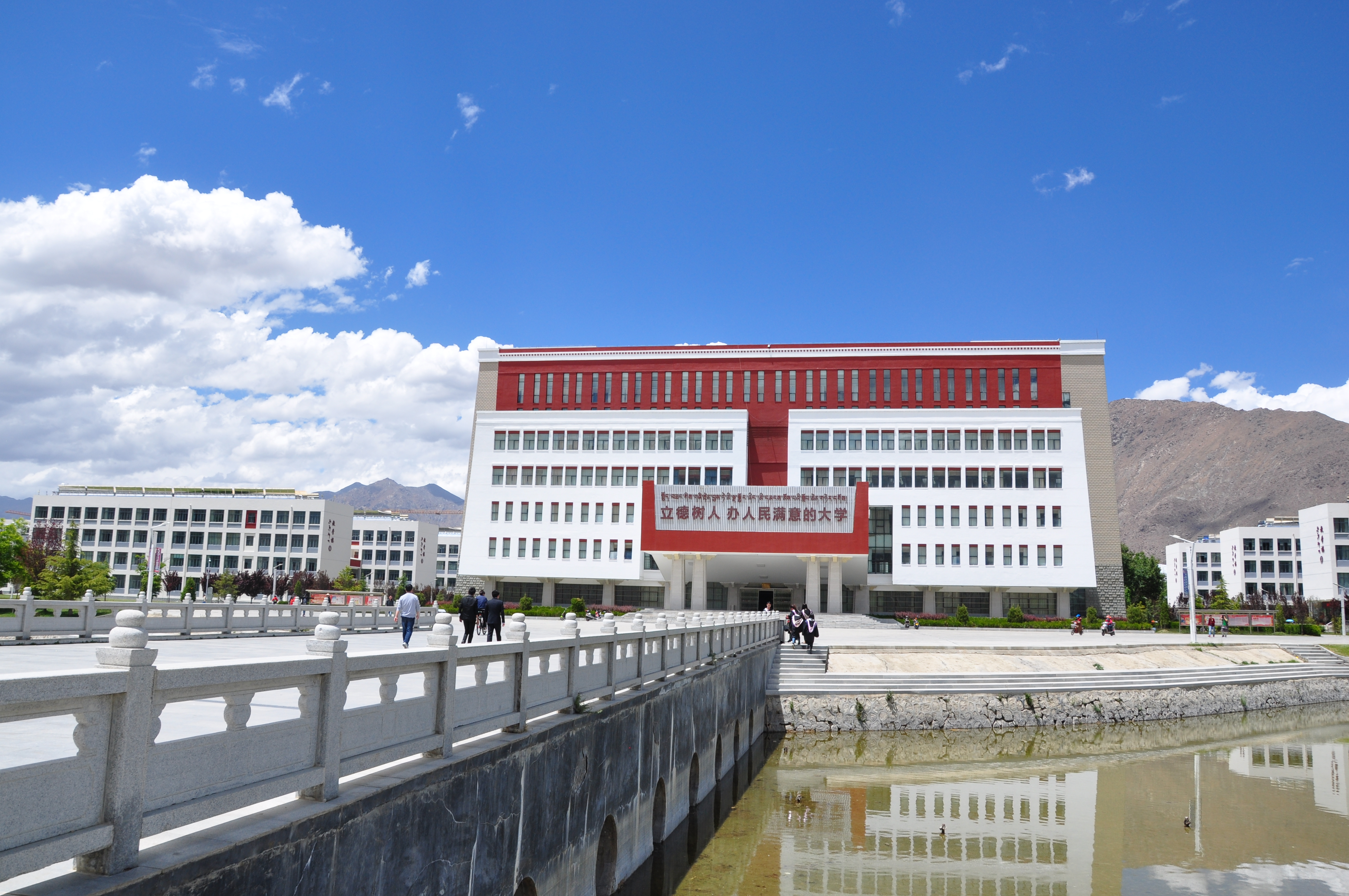
Tibet University's library on the new Lhasa campus

About 7,500 students are enrolled at the university. Nearly 20% of students study in the renowned Department of Tibetan Studies, which draws international students as well as locals, although the majority of instruction is delivered in Chinese. The university requires all students to pass a Tibetan language examination before graduation.

TU started accepting foreign students in 1993. They can learn Tibetan as a foreign language and enroll in specific courses such as Tibetan music and fine arts.

== Ranking and reputation ==
Tibet University is consistently ranked the best in Tibet Autonomous Region and since 2020, it has been ranked among the top 300 nationwide by the Best Chinese Universities Ranking. As of 2022, the Best Chinese Universities Ranking, also known as the "Shanghai Ranking", placed Tibet University 189th in China.

Tibet University was ranked # 2023 in the world by the University Rankings by Academic Performance 2024–2025.

== Administration ==
The university has 14 colleges: College of Letters, College of Science, College of Engineering, College of Medicine, College of Arts, College of Economics and Management, College of Foreign Languages, College of Political Science and Law, College of Education, College of Finance and Economics, College of Information Science and Technology, College of Marxism, College of Ecology and Environment, and Institute of Chinese National Community.
