= Richard Taylor (filmmaker) =

New Zealand filmmaker

Sir Richard Taylor KNZM
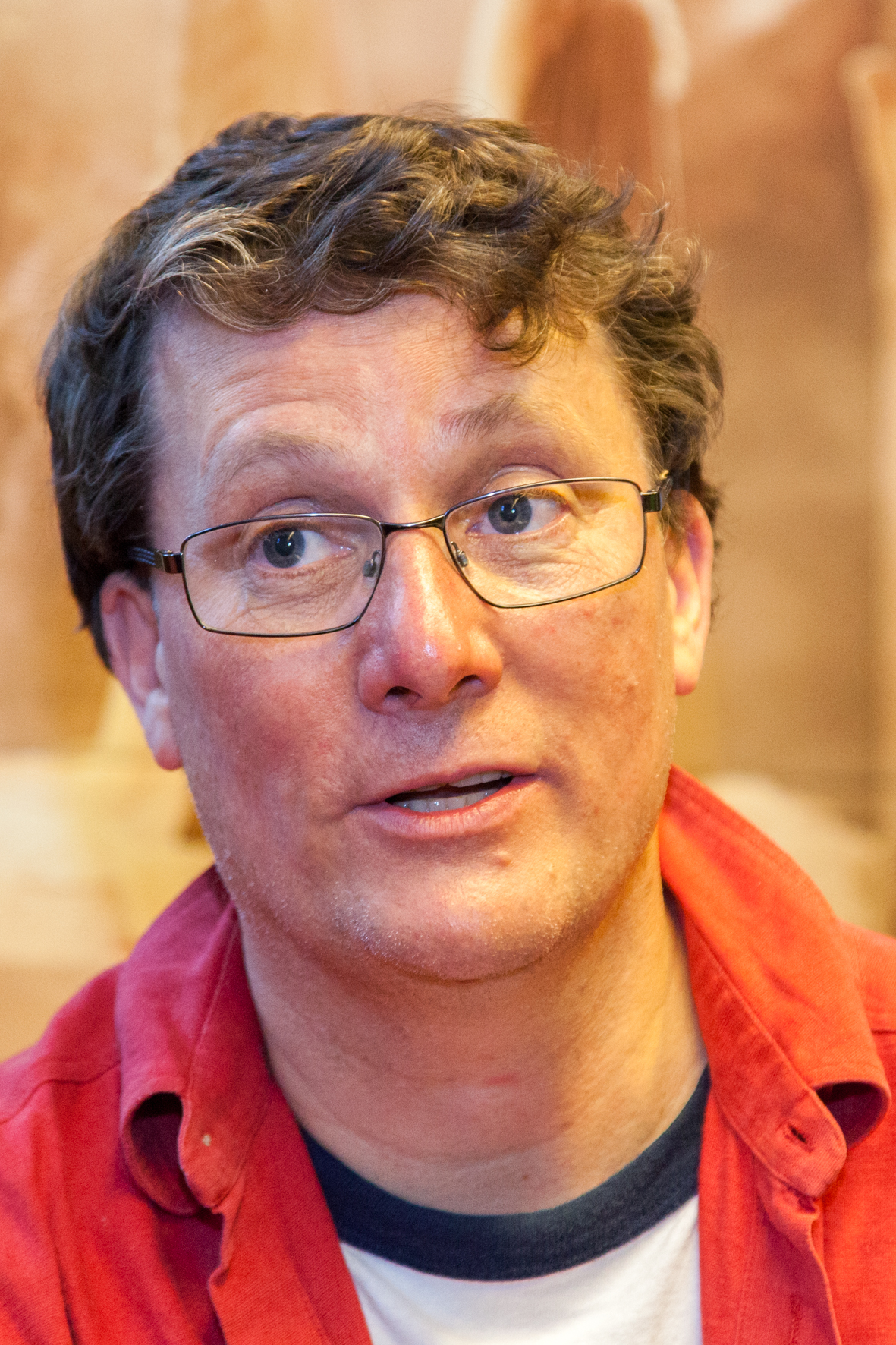
- Taylor in 2014
- Born: Richard Leslie Taylor; 8 February 1965 (age 61); Cheadle, Cheshire, England
- Occupation: Filmmaker
- Partner: Tania Taylor

Sir Richard Leslie Taylor KNZM (born 8 February 1965) is the founder, creative director and head of New Zealand film prop and special effects company Wētā Workshop.

Richard Taylor is best known for his work on both of Peter Jackson's Middle-earth film trilogies, The Lord of the Rings (2001–2003) and The Hobbit (2012–2014).

== Early life ==
Taylor was born in Cheadle, Cheshire, England, on 8 February 1965, and emigrated as a child to New Zealand, where his family lived at Te Hihi, and later the Auckland suburb of Patumahoe. He was naturalised as a New Zealand citizen in 1974. Taylor studied at Wesley College, Paerata, and then became a graduate of the former Wellington Polytechnic.

== Career ==
Peter Jackson, Taylor and his company created all of the props, costumes, prosthetics, miniatures and weaponry for Jackson's epic The Lord of the Rings film trilogy. For his work on the three films, he shared in winning four Academy Awards. This included two for The Lord of the Rings: The Fellowship of the Ring in Make Up and Visual Effects, and two for The Lord of the Rings: The Return of the King in Costume Design and Make Up. He was nominated for Costume Design for The Fellowship of the Ring.

Taylor can be seen and heard on all of The Lord of the Rings DVDs, in behind-the-scenes documentaries and on the audio commentaries on the extended edition DVDs. He also appeared on set to give direction to actors and stunt personnel in several fight scenes.

Both Richard Taylor and Wētā Workshop appear in the documentary film Reclaiming the Blade, where they discussed the creative and technical process of how movie props (specifically swords) are created at Wētā Workshop. Swords created by Wētā for films such as The Lord of the Rings and The Chronicles of Narnia are featured in the film as well.

In the 2004 New Year Honours, Taylor was appointed an Officer of the New Zealand Order of Merit, for services to design and the film industry. In the 2010 Queen's Birthday Honours, Taylor was promoted to Knight Companion of the New Zealand Order of Merit, for services to film.

Wētā Workshop has also worked on The Chronicles of Narnia: The Lion, the Witch and the Wardrobe. Richard Taylor and his crew designed and built all the armor, weapons and special props for the film. The company were also heavily involved in the making of Peter Jackson's interpretation of King Kong for which he won his fifth Academy Award, in Visual Effects.

In April 2009, Richard Taylor won the supreme award at the World Class New Zealand Awards. The awards honour New Zealand's tall poppies who are successful on an international level.

In February 2012 Taylor was named New Zealander of the year, beating finalists World of Wearable Art founder Suzie Moncrieff and Auckland plastic surgeon Sharad P. Paul, nominated for his work on skin cancer.

By 2014, Taylor's company, Wētā Workshop, was involved with Magic Leap, a startup company reported to be working on projects relating to augmented reality and computer vision that received over US$4.5 billion of venture funding by 2024.

In May 2020, due to economic fallout resulting from the COVID-19 pandemic, the relationship between Taylor's Weta Workshop and Magic Leap came to an end, when the latter company laid off about 1,000 staff members worldwide. All of the Magic Leap employees in New Zealand were laid off, and the partnership with Weta Workshop was dissolved.

== Awards and nominations ==
- Nominated: Best Costume Design, The Lord of the Rings: The Fellowship of the Ring (2001)
- Won: Best Makeup, The Lord of the Rings: The Fellowship of the Ring (2001)
- Won: Best Visual Effects, The Lord of the Rings: The Fellowship of the Ring (2001)
- Won: Best Makeup, The Lord of the Rings: The Return of the King (2003)
- Won: Best Costume Design, The Lord of the Rings: The Return of the King (2003)
- Won: Best Visual Effects, King Kong (2005)
