= I Am Not Madame Bovary =

- Theatrical release poster

Chinese name
- Traditional Chinese: 我不是潘金蓮
- Simplified Chinese: 我不是潘金莲
Transcriptions
Standard Mandarin
- Hanyu Pinyin: Wǒ Búshì Pān Jīnlián
- Directed by: Feng Xiaogang
- Written by: Liu Zhenyun
- Based on: I Did Not Kill My Husband by Liu Zhenyun
- Produced by: Hu Xiao Feng (also written Hu Xiaofeng)
- Starring: Fan Bingbing
- Narrated by: Feng Xiaogang
- Cinematography: Luo Pan
- Edited by: William Chang
- Music by: Du Wei
- Production companies: Beijing Sparkle Roll Media; Huayi Brothers Media; Beijing Skywheel Entertainment; Huayi Brothers Pictures; Zhejiang Dongyang Mayla Media
- Distributed by: Huayi Brothers; Soda Pictures (United Kingdom, Ireland)
- Release dates: 8 September 2016 (TIFF); 18 November 2016 (China)
- Running time: 137 minutes
- Country: China
- Language: Mandarin
- Box office: US$70.8 million

I Am Not Pan Jinlian (Chinese: 我不是潘金莲), known in English as I Am Not Madame Bovary, is a 2016 Chinese comedy drama film directed by Feng Xiaogang and written by Liu Zhenyun, based on Liu's 2012 novel I Did Not Kill My Husband. Starring Fan Bingbing in the lead role, it was selected to be screened in the Special Presentations section at the 2016 Toronto International Film Festival. and won the award for Best Achievement in Directing (Feng Xiaogang) at the Asia Pacific Screen Awards. It was released in China on 18 November 2016.

== Synopsis ==
The main protagonist, Li Xuelian, is a woman who divorces her husband in order to side-step Chinese law, which states that married couples can only own one property. In order to purchase another property, Li and her husband concoct a plan to divorce so that they can buy a second property. However, in the process of this, her now ex-husband marries another woman and denies ever agreeing to such a deal with Li. To further outrage and distance himself, he accuses Li of sleeping with other men (prostitution/being Madame Bovary). Li, outraged by this, goes to the local authorities to nullify the divorce so that she may legitimately divorce her husband. Authorities are puzzled by this as Li is already divorced. Li explains her principled approach, first to the local police that she and her husband agreed to divorce under the guise of buying property, but now she wishes to undertake a legitimate divorce. Li crusades for her cause, escalating her issue through each bureaucratic step in the system, from the local police, to local judiciary, to local magistrate, then to the Provincial authorities.

During Li's journey, she tries to hire her friends as hitmen to kill her ex-husband, is accused by her ex-husband of fooling around with other men, is arrested and sent to re-education camps, falsely led into an intimate relationship with a man in an effort by local authorities of ceasing her crusade, goes all the way to Beijing to protest her principled stance on nullifying her divorce. During her persistent crusade, her ex-husband dies, leading Li to lament over her, now, inability to seek retribution for her ex-husband's illicit affair and branding her a prostitute.

The movie concludes with Li settling alone in Beijing, running a noodle restaurant where she encounters one of the local officials who impeded her during her early crusade. She recounts her tale with the official (who was fired as a result of her crusade) and reveals that she initially divorced not to buy property, but so they could have two children. Li was pregnant at the time of the divorce and a divorce would mean she and her ex could "re"-marry and have another child. However, during her divorce and crusade, she had a miscarriage and lost the baby. The movie concludes with Li accepting her fate and life for what it is and lets go of her angst and hate.

== Cast ==
- Fan Bingbing as Li Xuelian, a village woman
- Da Peng as Wang Gongdao, the judge
- Yin Yuanzhang as Gu Daxing
- Feng Enhe as retired Chief Justice
- Liu Xin as Justice Xun
- Zhao Yi as Police Chief
- Zhao Lixin as County Chief Shi Weimin
- Jiang Yongbo as Mayor Cai
- Zhang Yi as Jia Congming
- Liu Hua as Lao Hu
- Li Zonghan as Qin Yuhe
- Guo Tao as Zhao Datou, Xuelian's classmate
- Huang Jianxin as Governor Chu
- Gao Ming as leader
- Yu Hewei as Zheng Zhong
- Zhang Jiayi as the magistrate
- Tian Xiaojie as Secretary of Mayor
- Li Chen as Police officer
- Hu Ming as Hospital driver
- Fan Wei as Guo Nong, orchard owner
- Feng Xiaogang (uncredited) as narrator

== Production ==
I Am Not Madame Bovary is Feng Xiaogang, Liu Zhenyun and Fan Bingbing's second collaboration, twelve years after their first, Cell Phone.

On 14 March 2016, a trailer was released via the film's producers.

== Release ==
The film was released theatrically on 18 November 2016.

=== Box office ===
The film has grossed CN¥483.2 million in China. It has grossed US$70 million worldwide.

== Reception ==
=== Critical reception ===
On review aggregator website Rotten Tomatoes, the film holds an approval rating of 86% based on 49 reviews, and an average rating of 6.7/10. The website's critical consensus reads, "I Am Not Madame Bovary's sly social commentary and well-constructed story anchor director Feng Xiaogang's visually experimental approach." On Metacritic, the film has a weighted average score of 65 out of 100, based on 13 critics, indicating "generally favorable reviews".

=== Accolades ===
Date	Award	Category	Recipient(s) and nominee(s)	Result	Notes
2016	64th San Sebastian Film Festival	Silver Shell for Best Actress	Fan Bingbing	Won	
2016	64th San Sebastian Film Festival	Golden Shell for Best Film	I Am Not Madame Bovary	Won	
2016	41st Toronto International Film Festival	FIPRESCI Special Presentations	Feng Xiaogang	Won	
2016	53rd Golden Horse Awards	Best Feature Film	I Am Not Madame Bovary	Nominated	
2016	53rd Golden Horse Awards	Best Director	Feng Xiaogang	Won	
2016	53rd Golden Horse Awards	Best Adapted Screenplay	Liu Zhenyun	Nominated	
2016	53rd Golden Horse Awards	Best Actress	Fan Bingbing	Nominated	
2016	53rd Golden Horse Awards	Best Original Film Score	Du Wei	Nominated	
2016	53rd Golden Horse Awards	Audience Choice Award	Beijing Sparkle Roll Media Corporation, Huayi Brothers Media Corporation, Beijing Skywheel Entertainment Co., Ltd., Huayi Brothers Pictures Ltd., Zhejiang Dongyang Mayla Media Co., Ltd.	Won	
2017	11th Asian Film Awards	Best Actress	Fan Bingbing	Won	
2017	11th Asian Film Awards	Best Film	I Am Not Madame Bovary	Won	
2017	11th Asian Film Awards	Best Director	Feng Xiaogang	Nominated	
2017	11th Asian Film Awards	Best Supporting Actor	Dong Chengpeng	Nominated	
2017	11th Asian Film Awards	Best Cinematographer	Luo Pan	Won	
2017	24th Beijing College Student Film Festival	Best Film	I Am Not Madame Bovary	Nominated	
2017	24th Beijing College Student Film Festival	Best Director	Feng Xiaogang	Won	
2017	24th Beijing College Student Film Festival	Best Screenplay	Liu Zhenyun	Nominated	
2017	24th Beijing College Student Film Festival	Artistic Exploration Award	—N/a	Nominated	
2017	31st Golden Rooster Awards	Best Picture	I Am Not Madame Bovary	Nominated	
2017	31st Golden Rooster Awards	Best Director	Feng Xiaogang	Won	
2017	31st Golden Rooster Awards	Best Actress	Fan Bingbing	Won	
2017	31st Golden Rooster Awards	Best Supporting Actor	Yu Hewei	Won	
2017	31st Golden Rooster Awards	Best Writing	Liu Zhenyun	Nominated	
2017	31st Golden Rooster Awards	Best Sound	Wu Jiang	Nominated	
2017	17th Chinese Film Media Awards	Best Screenwriter	Liu Zhenyun	Nominated	
