= Fan Wei (actor) =

Chinese actor

- 范伟
- Born: 2 September 1962 (age 63); Dadong District, Shenyang, Liaoning, China
- Occupation: Actor
- Years active: 2002–present
- Spouse: Yang Baoling (m. 1990)
- Children: 1
- Awards: Full list

Chinese name
- Traditional Chinese: 范偉
- Simplified Chinese: 范伟
Transcriptions
Standard Mandarin
- Hanyu Pinyin: Fàn Wěi

Fan Wei (born 2 September 1962) is a Chinese actor. He gained fame through his collaboration with Zhao Benshan in comedy sketches at CCTV New Year's Galas since 1995. He is also known for his roles in television series, Liu Gaogen (2002; 2020; 2021), Ma Dashuai (2003-2006) and The Long Season (2023), as well as in films Cell Phone (2003), A World Without Thieves (2004), If You Are the One (2008), City of Life and Death (2009), Back to 1942 (2012), Personal Tailor (2013), Mr. No Problem (2017), for which he won the Best Leading Actor at the 53rd Golden Horse Awards, and One Second (2020).

== Early life ==
Fan was born in Dadong District of Shenyang, Liaoning, on 2 September 1962. His father was a publicity officer in a factory and his mother was a salesperson. He has an elder sister and a younger brother. In 1978, by age 16, Fan studied xiangsheng under mentor Chen Lianzhong (陈连仲), a xiangsheng actor of Shenyang Ballad Singers Troupe, which Fan officially joined five years later. In 1986, he participated in the National Xiangsheng Competition, which led to widespread recognition among audiences in northeast China.

== Acting career ==
In 1999, Fan made his film debut with a minor role in Male Sorority Director. His first main role in a movie came with the Spring Subway, alongside Xu Jinglei, Geng Le, Zhang Yang and Wang Ning.

In 2003, Fan's performance in the comedy film The Parking Attendant in July which earned him Best Actor at the 28th Montreal World Film Festival and 11th Beijing College Student Film Festival and was nominated for Best Actor at the Golden Rooster Awards. That same year, he got a small role in Feng Xiaogang's comedy-drama film Cell Phone.

Fan had key supporting role in the 2004 A World Without Thieves, an action drama film starring Andy Lau, Rene Liu, Ge You, Li Bingbing, and Wang Baoqiang.

In 2007, he appeared in the comedy film Lucky Dog, which earned hi a Best Actor at the 9th Chinese Film Media Awards and received nomination at the 23rd Golden Rooster Awards. That same year, he co-starred with Liu Ye, Gao Yuanyuan, and Qin Lan in Lu Chuan's drama film City of Life and Death.

In 2008, Fan was cast in romantic comedy film If You Are the One, opposite Ge You, Shu Qi, Alex Fong Chung-Sun, Feng Yuanzheng and Vivian Hsu. He won the Students' Choice Award for Favorite Actor at the 16th Beijing College Student Film Festival for his performance in Set Off.

Fan had a small role in the 2009 historical drama The Founding of a Republic.

In 2010, for his role in Brothers' Happiness, Fan won the Audience Favorite TV Actor at the 25th Golden Eagle Awards and Most Charismatic Actor at the 16th Magnolia Awards.

In 2011, Fan portrayed politician Li Yuanhong in the propaganda film The Founding of a Party. He played the title role in the comedy film Crazy Dinner Party, co-starring Huang Bo, Monica Mok, and Liu Hua. He played a lead role as Priest in the comedy film Guns and Roses, alongside Lei Jiayin, Guo Tao and Tao Hong. He played the role of Kong Lingxue in Tracks Kong Lingxue, for which he earned Most Brilliant Actor at the 3rd China Image Film Festival in London.

In 2012, he played Lao Ma, the lead role in Feng Xiaogang's Back to 1942.

In 2013, Fan was cast as a lead role in the Huayi Brothers's production Personal Tailor, costarring Ge You, Bai Baihe, Li Xiaolu and Zheng Kai.

Fan was cast in the fantasy-adventure-comedy film Monk Comes Down the Mountain (2014), playing the teacher of Wang Baoqiang's character.

In 2016, he landed a guest starring role in the comedy film I Am Not Madame Bovary, a film adaptation based on the novel I Did Not Kill My Husband by novelist Liu Zhenyun. He took the lead role in the drama film Someone to Talk To, which also adapted from Liu Zhenyun's novel.

In 2017, Fan earned critical acclaim for his performance in the black-and-white film Mr. No Problem, for which he earned Best Leading Actor at the 53rd Golden Horse Awards, Best Actor at the 7th Beijing International Film Festival, and received Best Actor nominations at the 11th Asian Film Awards, 25th Beijing College Student Film Festival, and 9th China Film Director's Guild Awards.

In 2019, he was cast in the crime film Hunt Down, playing the father of Jiao Junyan's and husband of Chen Shu's characters. He was nominated for Best Supporting Actor at the 12th Macau International Movie Festival.

Fan starred opposite Liu Haocun and Zhang Yi in Zhang Yimou's drama film One Second. He also appeared in Love You Forever, opposite Li Yitong and Lee Hong-chi.

In 2021, he starred in the war film Railway Heroes with Zhang Hanyu, Vision Wei, Zhou Ye and Yu Haoming.

In 2023, Fan starred in The Long Season, which earned him the International Competition: Best Actor at the 18th Seoul International Drama Awards and Best Actor at the 32nd China Television Golden Eagle Awards.

== Personal life ==
In 1988, Fan was introduced by a friend to Yang Baoling (杨宝玲), a nurse of Shenyang Children's Hospital. They got married on 10 April 1990. Their son Fan Xiwen (范曦文) was born at the end of 1992.

== Filmography ==
=== Film ===
Year	English title	Chinese title	Role	Notes	Ref.
1999	Male Sorority Director	男妇女主任	Secretary		
2000		称心如意	Gao Yuhang		
2001	Spring Subway	开往春天的地铁	Wang Yao		
2003	The Parking Attendant in July	看车人的七月	Du Hongjun		
2003	Cell Phone	手机	Zhuantou		
2004		求求你表扬我	Yang Hongqi		
2004	A World Without Thieves	天下无贼	A robber		
2005	The Road	芳香之旅	Lao Cui		
2006	Cars	赛车总动员	Mater	dub	
2007	City of Life and Death	南京！南京！	Tang Tian		
2007	Ticket	车票	Father Ding		
2007	Lucky Dog	耳朵大有福	Wang Kangmei		
2008	Set Off	即日启程	Lao Cui		
2008	Fit Lover	爱情呼叫转移2	Fan Zhongju		
2008	If You Are the One	非诚勿扰	Mr. Fan		
2009	The Founding of a Republic	建国大业	Guo Bencai		
2011	Crazy Dinner Party	饭局也疯狂	Master Tan		
2011	Tracks Kong Lingxue	跟踪孔令学	Kong Lingxue		
2011	Guns and Roses	黄金大劫案	Priest		
2011	The Founding of a Party	建党伟业	Li Yuanhong		
2011	Angry Kid	愤怒的小孩	Sun Zhongmou		
2011	Legend of A Rabbit	兔侠传奇	Rabbit	dub	
2011	Cars 2	赛车总动员2	Mater	dub	
2012	Back to 1942	一九四二	Lao Ma		
2013	Personal Tailor	私人订制	Driver		
2014	Monk Comes Down the Mountain	道士下山	Cui Daoning		
2016	I Am Not Madame Bovary	我不是潘金莲	Guo Nong		
2016	Someone to Talk To	一句顶一万句	Song Jiefang		
2017	Mr. No Problem	不成问题的问题	Ding Wuyuan		
2017	The One	绝世高手	Huang Jierui		
2017	What A Day !	有完没完	Lao Fan		
2017	Father and Son	父子雄兵	Fan Yingxiong		
2017	City of Rock	缝纫机乐队	Chairman Fan		
2019	Hunt Down	长安道	Wan Zhenggang		
2019	Two Tigers	两只老虎	Fan Zhigang		
2020	Love You Forever	我在时间尽头等你	Lin Liguo		
2020	One Second	一秒钟	Fan Dianying		
2020	My People, My Homeland	我和我的家乡	Lao Fan	Last Lesson	
2021		勇敢的你	Fu Yangyue		
2021	Knock Knock	不速来客	Lao Li		
2021	Railway Heroes	铁道英雄	Lao Wang		
2021	Love After Love	第一炉香	Situ Xie		
2021		来锻炼了			
2021	The Fallen Bridge	断桥			
2023	If You are the One 3	非诚勿扰3	Lao Fan		
2024	Strangers when We Meet	朝云暮雨	Lao Qin		

=== Television ===
Year	English title	Chinese title	Role	Notes
1992	Head of a Village	一村之长		
1996		夜深人不静	Miser	
2002	Liu Laogen	刘老根	Li Baoku	
2003	Ma Dashuai	马大帅	Fan Debiao	
2003		将装修进行到底	Yang Xiaodong	
2003		讨个媳妇过新年	Businessman Wu	
2003	Jade Guanyin	玉观音	Prisoner	
2004		压岁钱		
2004		快乐能活100年	Wu Ahren	
2005	The Criminal Officer of the Song Dynasty	大宋提刑官	Tan Lizheng	
2006	Country Love	乡村爱情	Wang Musheng	
2008		关东大先生	Han Tingyu	
2008	Seven Days Shaking the world	震撼世界的七日	Zhuang Xiwei	
2010		雷哥老范	Fan Chunlei	
2010	Brothers' Happiness	老大的幸福	Fu Jixiang	
2011	Married Love First	先结婚后恋爱	Teng Fei	
2013		上阵父子兵	Qiao Richeng	
2013		老家门口唱大戏	Sunda Mingbai	
2014	Xiaobao and Laocai	小宝和老财	Zhou Laocai	
2017	Star-spangled	星光灿烂	Geng Xingguang	
2019	Villagers love	乡亲乡爱	Zhuang Xingyuan	
2019	New Fortress Besieged	热爱	Mei Ranguang	
2020	Liu Laogen 3	刘老根3	Li Baoku	
2021	Liu Laogen 4	刘老根4	Li Baoku	
2023	The Long Season	漫长的季节	Wang Xiang	

== CCTV New Year's Gala ==
Year	English title	Chinese title	Cast	Notes
1995		牛大叔"提干	Zhao Benshan, Zhang Yuping	
1996		三鞭子	Zhao Benshan, Li Hai	
1997	Red Sorghum Model Team	红高粱模特队	Zhao Benshan	
1998	New Year Greetings	拜年	Zhao Benshan, Gao Xiumin	
1999	Feel for Others	将心比心	Gao Xiumin, Heimei	
2001	Selling a Cane	卖拐	Zhao Benshan, Gao Xiumin	
2002	Selling a Bike	卖车	Zhao Benshan, Gao Xiumin	
2003	Anxiety	心病	Zhao Benshan, Gao Xiumin	
2004	Water Delivery Worker	送水工	Zhao Benshan, Gao Xiumin	
2005	Kungfu	功夫	Zhao Benshan, Cai Weili, Wang Xiaohu	

== Awards and nominations ==
=== Film awards ===
Year	Nominated work	Award	Result	Notes
Montreal World Film Festival
2004 (28th)	The Parking Attendant in July	Best Actor	Won	
Cairo International Film Festival
2006 (30th)	The Road	Special Mention Award	Won	
China Image Film Festival
2011 (3rd)	Tracks Kong Lingxue	Most Brilliant Actor	Won	
Beijing International Film Festival
2017 (7th)	Mr. No Problem	Best Actor	Won	
2024 (14th)	Strangers When We Meet	Best Actor	Won	
Golden Rooster Awards
2003 (23rd)	The Parking Attendant in July	Best Actor	Nominated	
2009 (27th)	Lucky Dog	Best Actor	Nominated	
2021 (34th)	One Second	Best Supporting Actor	Won	
Golden Horse Film Festival and Awards
2016 (53rd)	Mr. No Problem	Best Actor	Won	
Asian Film Awards
2017 (11th)	Mr. No Problem	Best Actor	Nominated	
Beijing College Student Film Festival
2004 (11th)	The Parking Attendant in July	Best Actor	Won	
2009 (16th)	Set Off	Favorite Actor	Won	
2018 (25th)	Mr. No Problem	Best Actor	Nominated	
Chinese Film Media Awards
2009 (9th)	Lucky Dog	Best Actor	Won	
Chinese Film Media Awards
2017 (8th)	Someone to Talk To	Actor of the Year	Nominated	
2018 (9th)	Mr. No Problem	Actor of the Year	Nominated	
Macau International Movie Festival
2019 (11th)	Hunt Down	Best Actor	Nominated	
2020 (12th)	Two Tigers	Best Supporting Actor	Nominated	
Huading Awards
2021 (31st)	One Second	Best Supporting Actor	Won	
Golden Phoenix Awards
2005 (10th)	The Parking Attendant in July		Won	

=== Television series awards ===
Year	Nominated work	Award	Result	Notes
Asia Contents Awards & Global OTT Awards
2023 (5th)	The Long Season	Best Lead Actor	Nominated	
Seoul International Drama Awards
2023 (18th)	The Long Season	Best Actor	Won	
Magnolia Awards
2010 (16th)	Brothers' Happiness	Best Actor	Nominated	
2010 (16th)	Brothers' Happiness	Most Charismatic Actor	Won	
2024 (29th)	The Long Season	Best Actor	Nominated	
Golden Eagle Awards
2003 (21st)	Liu Laogen 2	Audience's Choice for Actor	Nominated	
2010 (25th)	Brothers' Happiness	Audience's Choice for Actor	Won	
2024 (32nd)	The Long Season	Best Actor	Won	
Flying Apsaras Awards
2003 (23rd)	Liu Laogen 2	Outstanding Actor	Nominated	
