= Asian Film Award for Best Actor =

Asian Film Awards

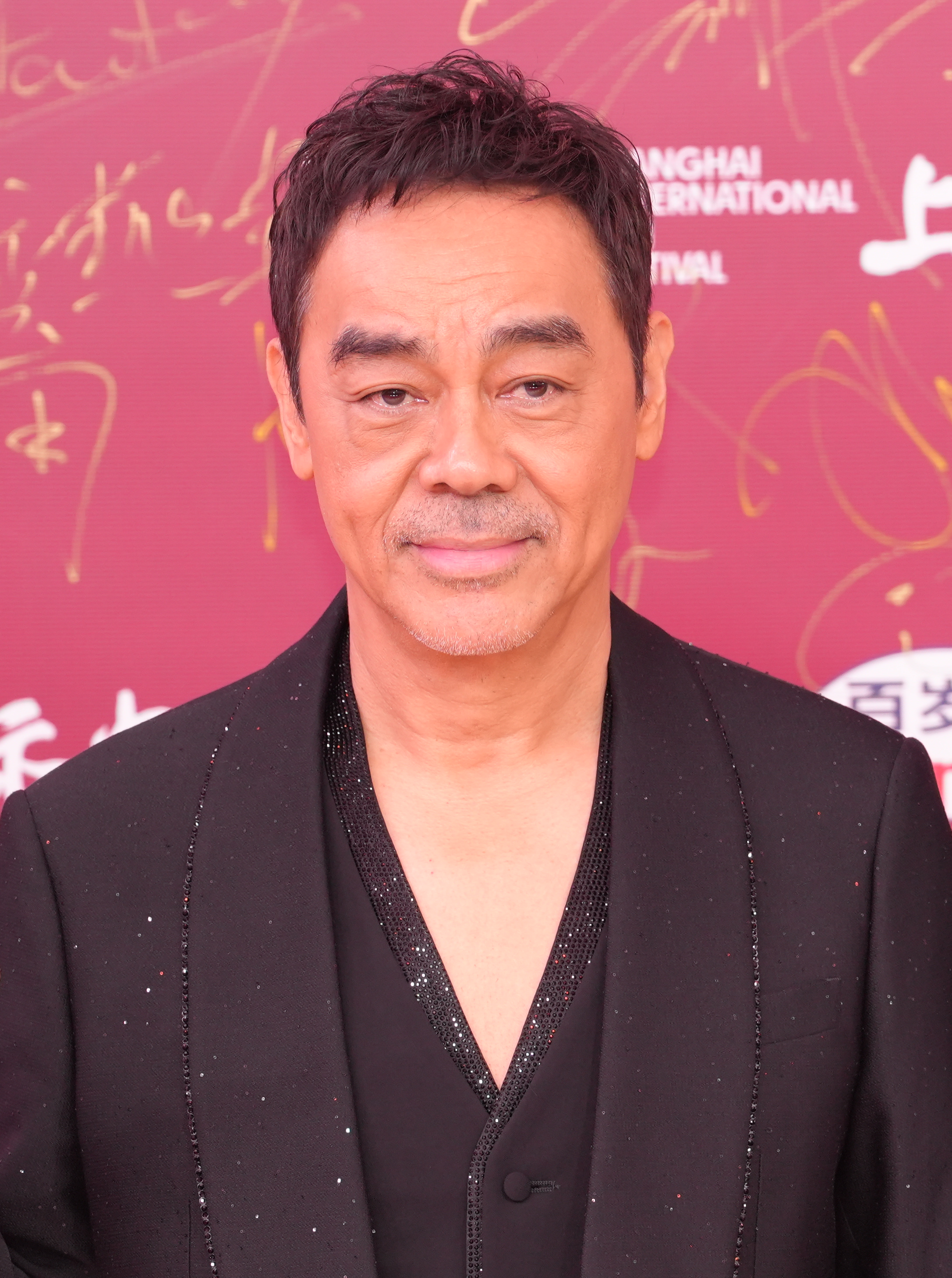
- The 2025 recipient: Sean Lau
- Awarded for: Best Performance by an Actor in a Leading Role in Asian Cinema
- Presented by: Asian Film Awards Academy
- First award: 2007
- Most recent winner: Sean Lau for Papa (2025)
- Website: afa-academy.com

The Asian Film Award for Best Actor is presented annually by the Asian Film Awards Academy (AFAA), a non-profit organization founded by Busan International Film Festival, Hong Kong International Film Festival and Tokyo International Film Festival with the shared goal of celebrating excellence in Asian cinema.

It was first presented in 2007 during the first edition of the awards. South Korean actor Song Kang-ho was the first recipient of the award for his role in The Host. Hong Kong actor Tony Leung Chiu-wai, South Korean actor Lee Byung-hun, and Japanese actor Koji Yakusho are the only actors who have received this award more than once with two wins each.

== Winners and nominees ==
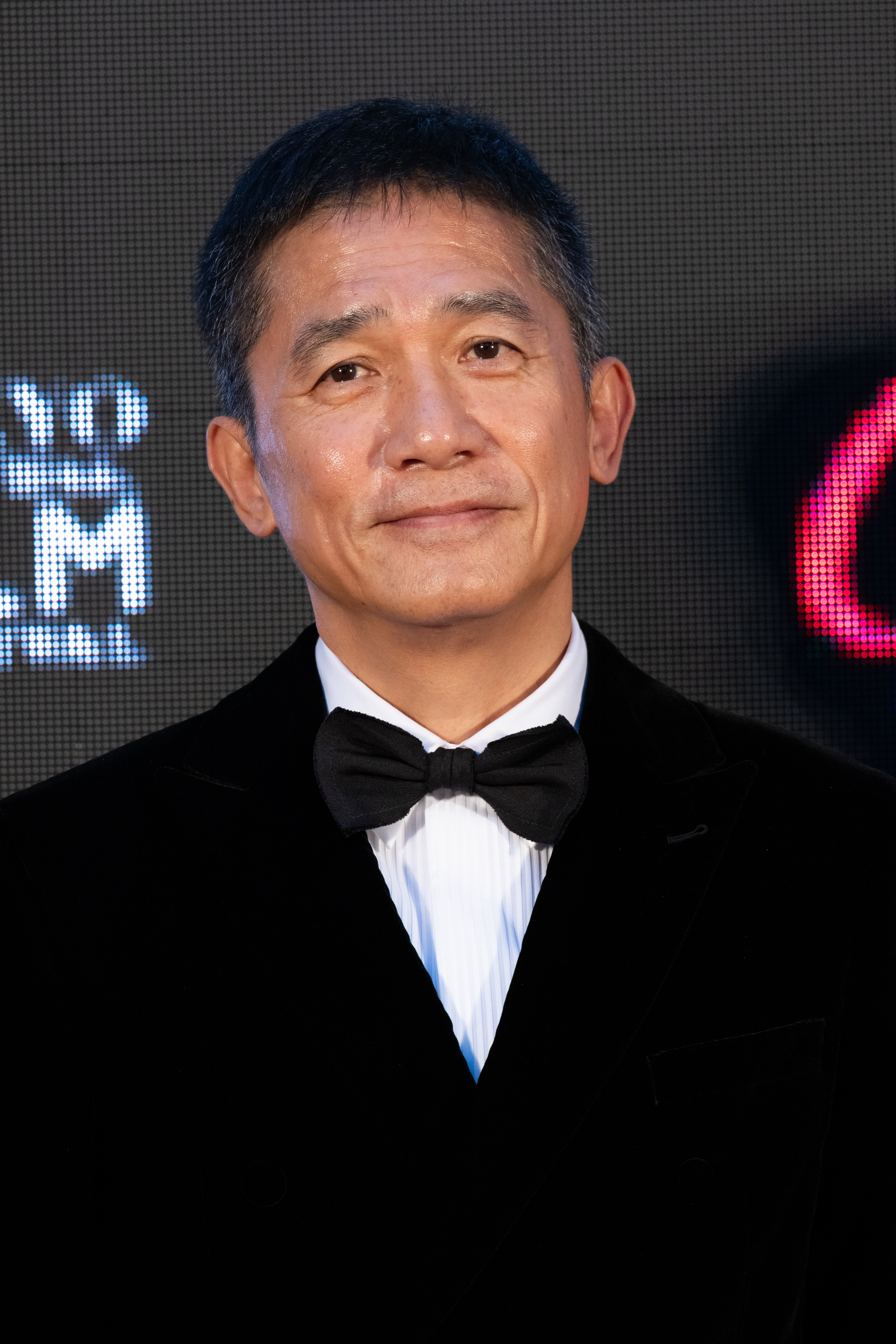
Tony Leung Chiu-wai won twice, in 2007 for Lust, Caution and in 2023 for Where the Wind Blows.

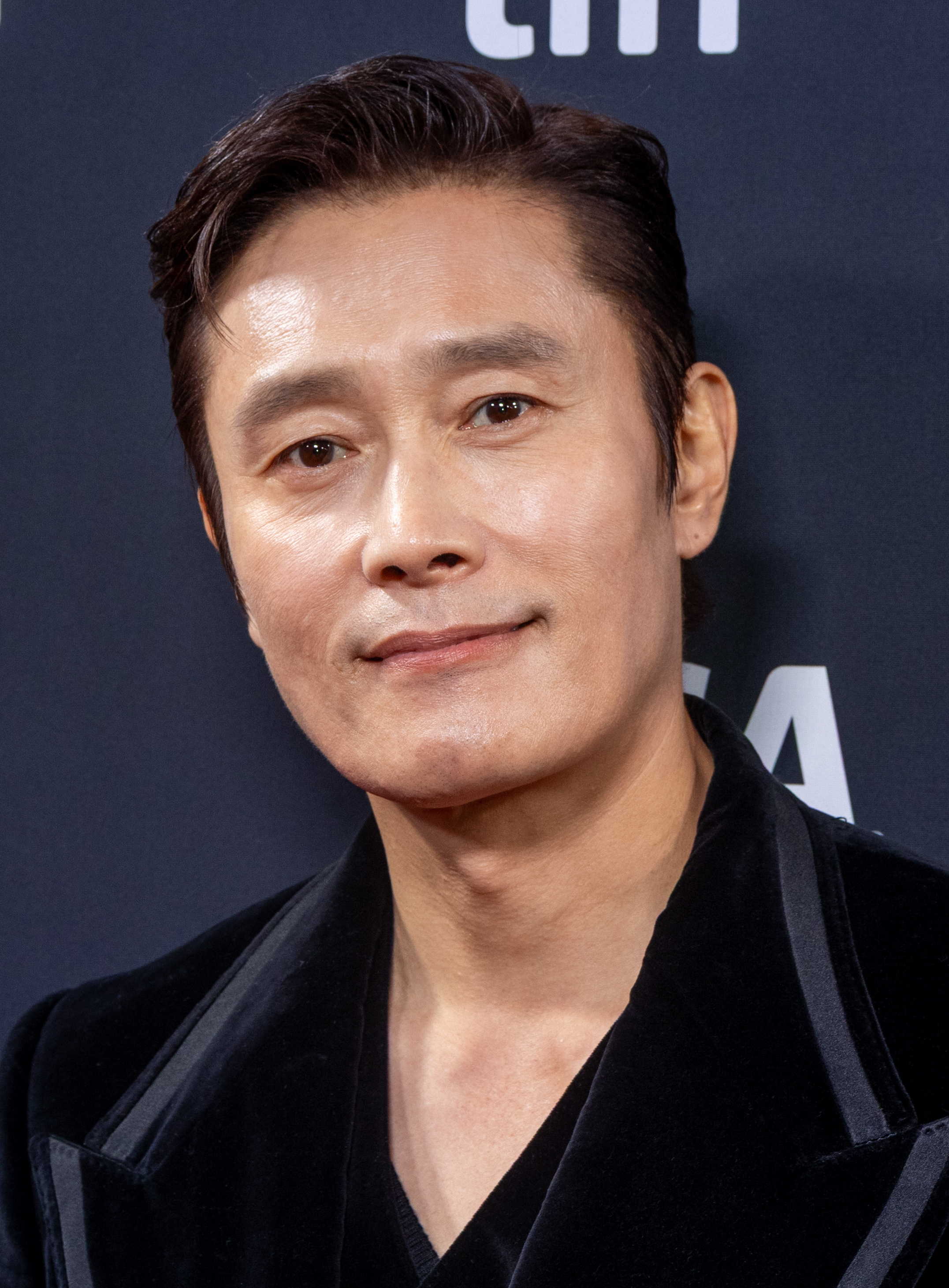
Lee Byung-hun won twice, in 2016 for Inside Men and in 2020 for The Man Standing Next.

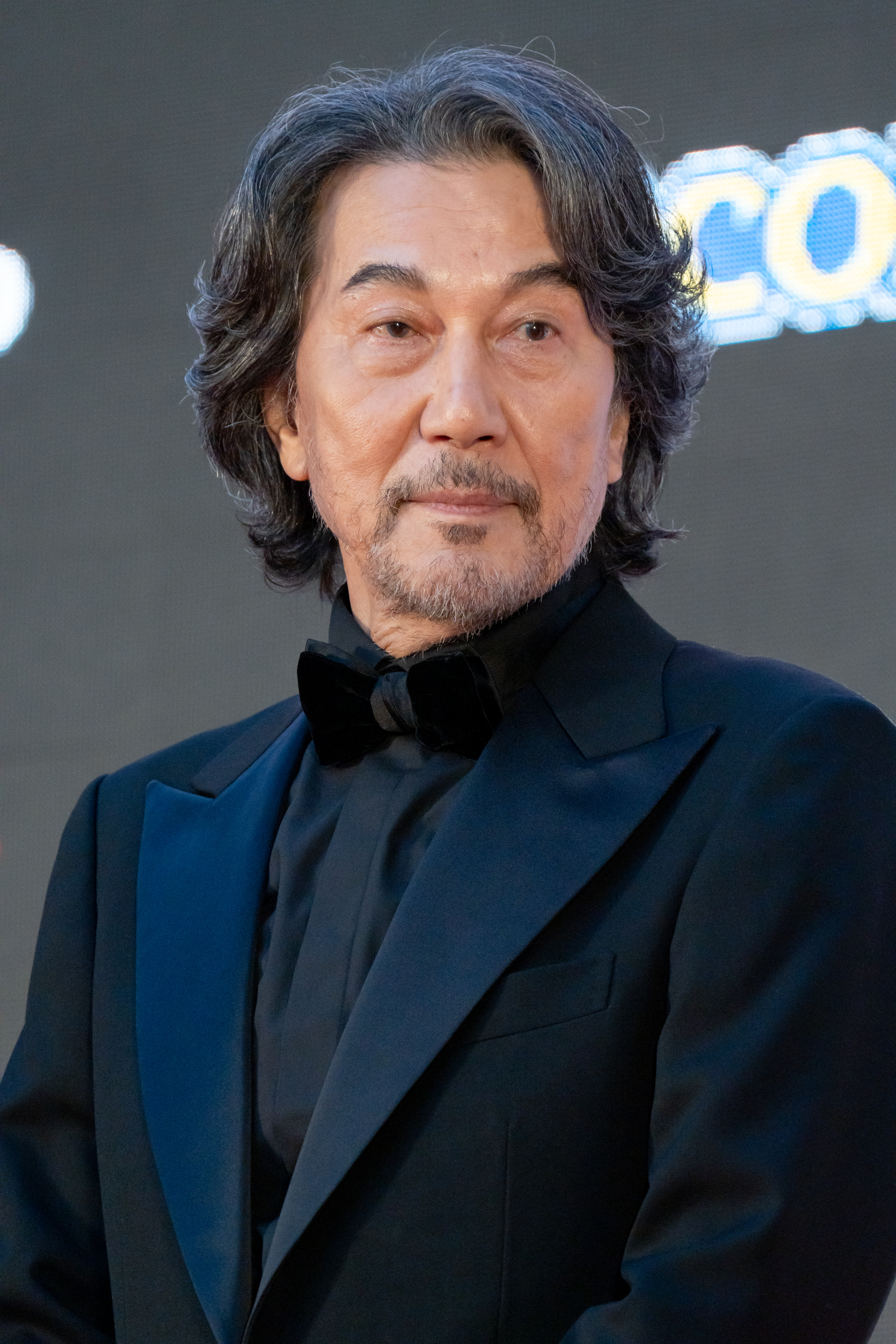
Koji Yakusho won twice, in 2019 for The Blood of Wolves and in 2024 for Perfect Days.

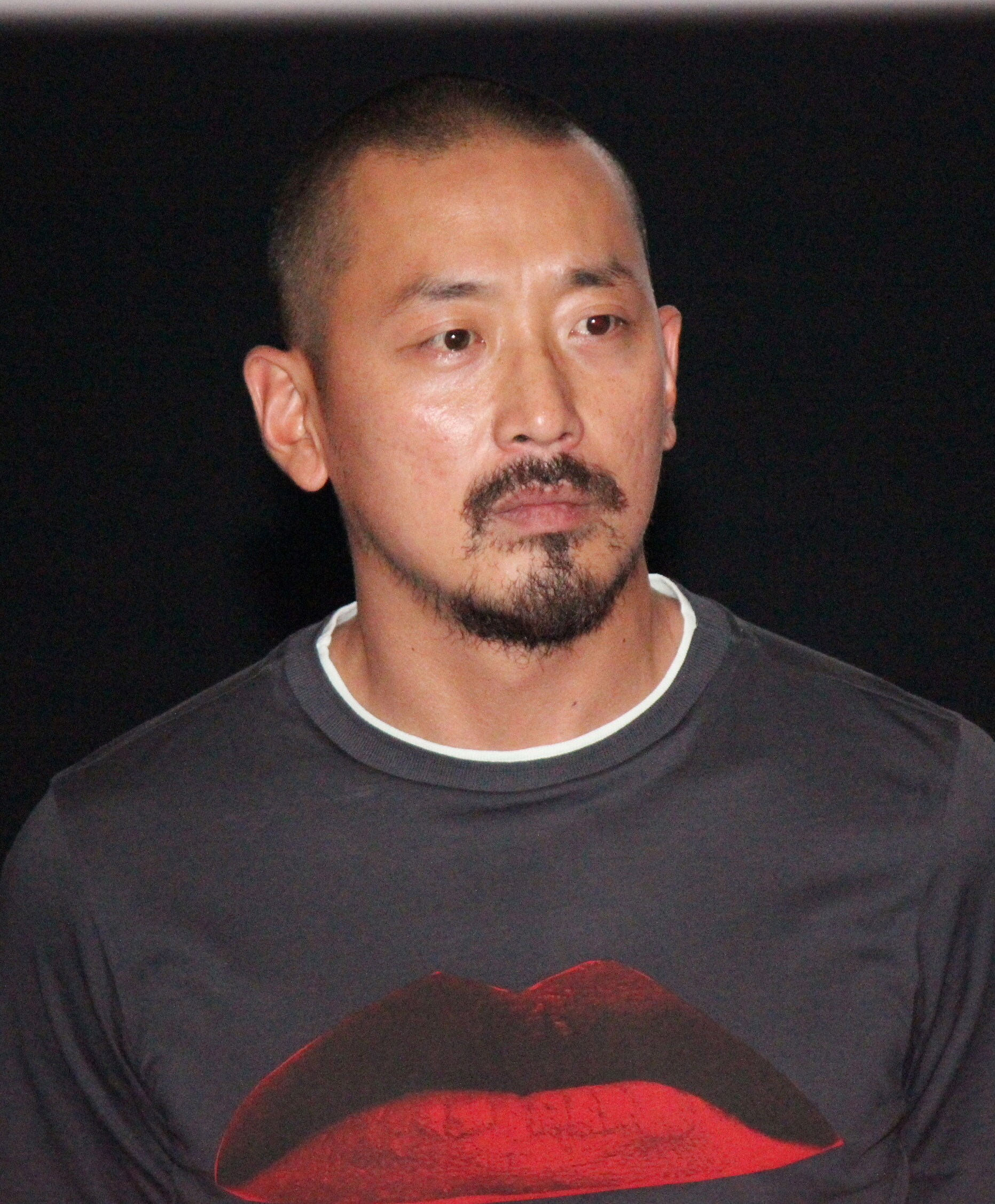
Ha Jung-woo won in 2011 for The Yellow Sea.

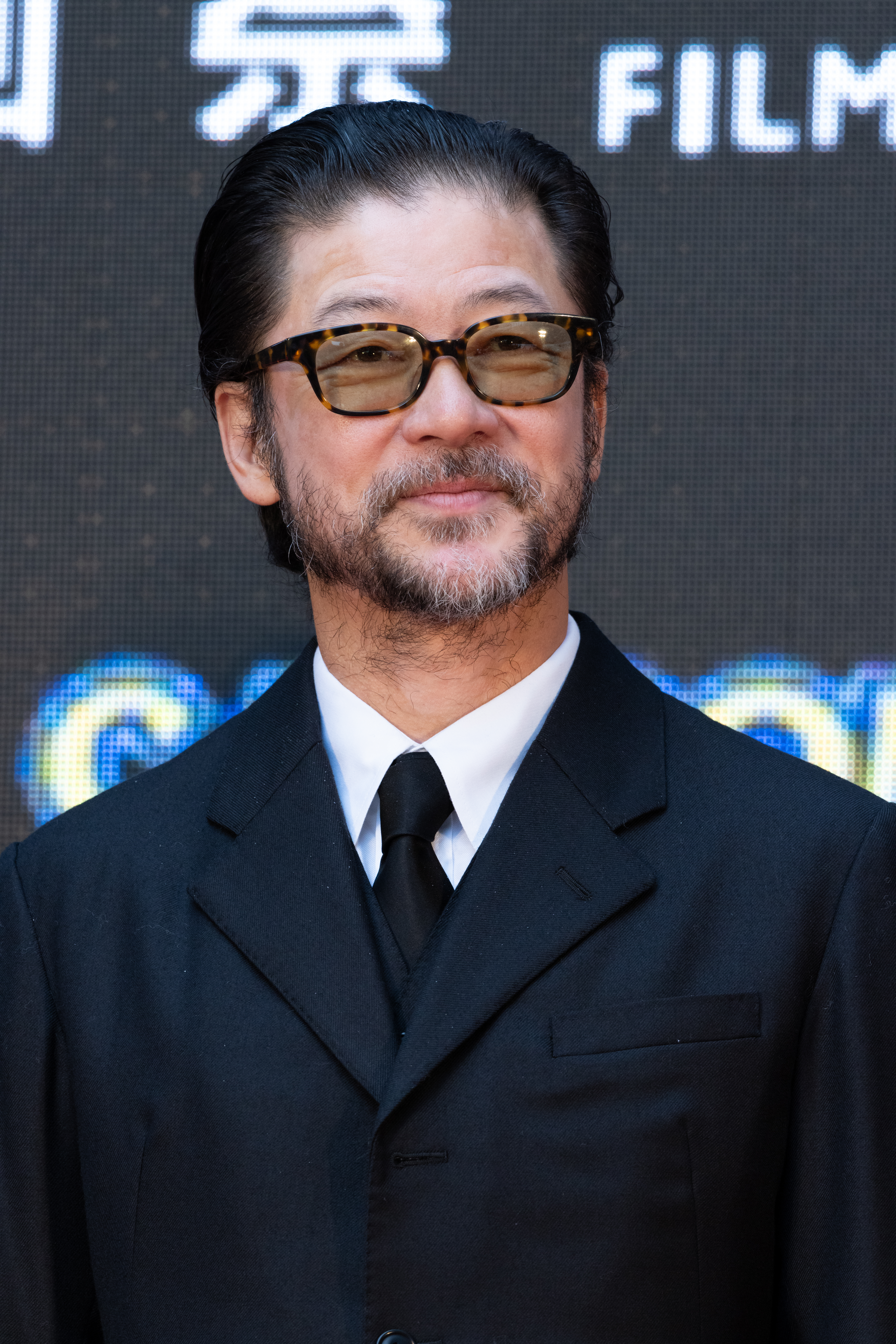
Tadanobu Asano won in 2017 for Harmonium.

Louis Koo won in 2018 for Paradox.

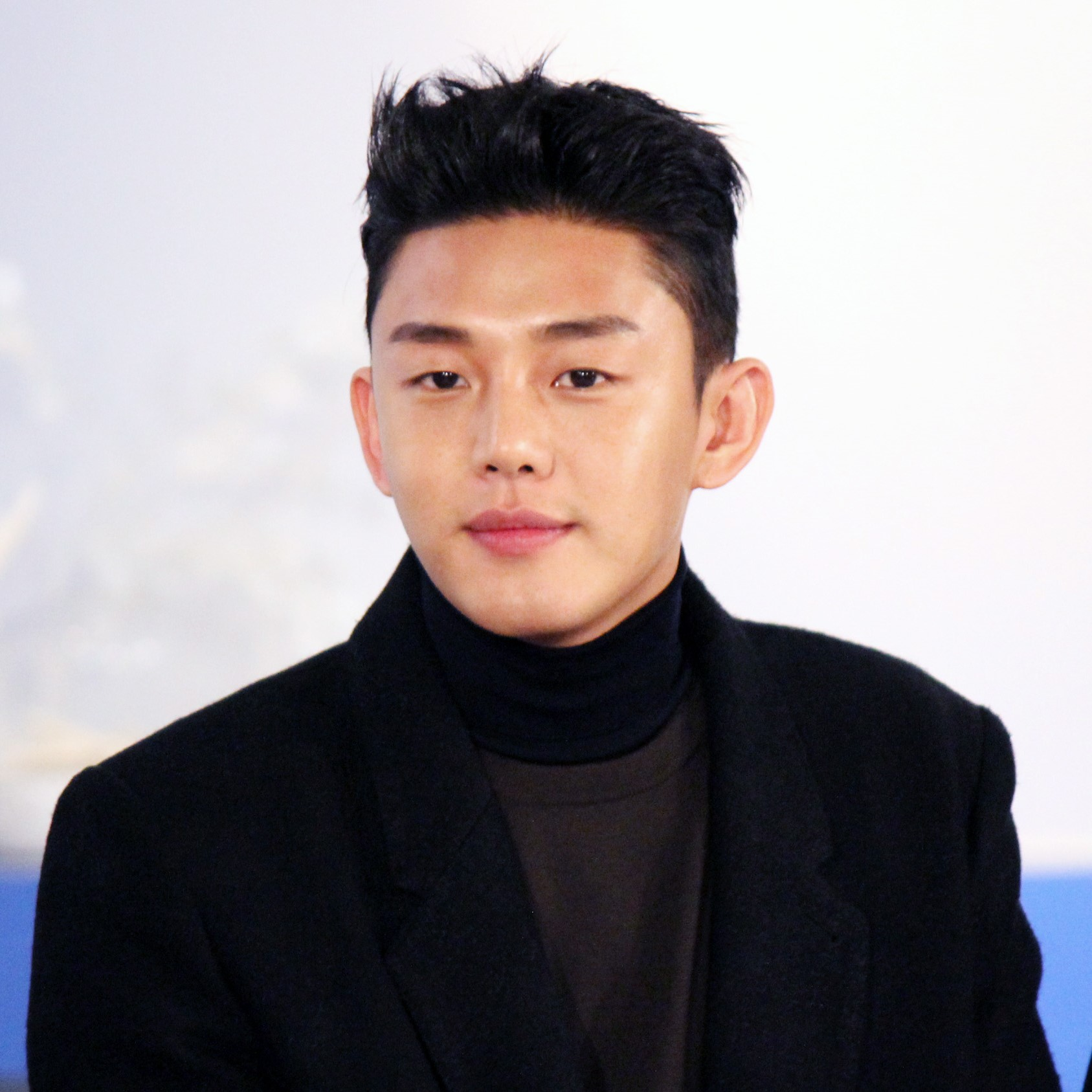
Yoo Ah-in won in 2021 for Voice of Silence.

=== 2000s ===
| Year | Actor | English title | Original title | Ref. |
|---|---|---|---|---|
| 2007 | (South Korea) Song Kang-ho | The Host | 괴물, Goemul | |
| 2007 | (Taiwan) Chang Chen | The Go Master | 吴清源 Wú Qīngyuán | |
| 2007 | (India) Shah Rukh Khan | Don | | |
| 2007 | (Hong Kong) Andy Lau | A Battle of Wits | | |
| 2007 | (South Korea) Rain | I'm a Cyborg, But That's OK | 싸이보그지만 괜찮아 Ssaibogeujiman Gwaenchanha | |
| 2007 | (Japan) Ken Watanabe | Memories of Tomorrow | 明日の記憶 Ashita no Kioku | |
| 2008 | (Hong Kong) Tony Leung Chiu-Wai | Lust, Caution | 色，戒 | |
| 2008 | (Taiwan) Jack Kao | Good Man Dog | | |
| 2008 | (Japan) Ryō Kase | I Just Didn't Do It | それでもボクはやってない | |
| 2008 | (China) Jet Li | The Warlords | | |
| 2008 | (Japan) Joe Odagiri | Tokyo Tower | 東京タワー 〜オカンとボクと、時々、オトン〜 | |
| 2008 | (South Korea) Song Kang-ho | Secret Sunshine | 밀양 Milyang | |
| 2009 | (Japan) Masahiro Motoki | Departures | おくりびと, Okuribito | |
| 2009 | (China) Ge You | If You Are the One | 非诚勿扰 Fēichéng Wùrǎo | |
| 2009 | (South Korea) Ha Jung-woo | The Chaser | 추격자 Chugyeogja | |
| 2009 | (India) Akshay Kumar | Singh Is Kinng | सिंह इज़ किंग | |
| 2009 | (Japan) Kenichi Matsuyama | Detroit Metal City | デトロイト・メタル・シティ | |
| 2009 | (South Korea) Song Kang-ho | The Good, the Bad, the Weird | 좋은 놈, 나쁜 놈, 이상한 놈, Joheun nom nabbeun nom isanghan nom | |

=== 2010s ===
| Year | Actor | English title | Original title | Ref. |
|---|---|---|---|---|
| 2010 | (China) Wang Xueqi | Bodyguards and Assassins | 十月圍城 | |
| 2010 | (Japan) Tadanobu Asano | Villon's Wife | ヴィヨンの妻 〜桜桃とタンポポ〜 | |
| 2010 | (China) Huang Bo | Cow | 斗牛 | |
| 2010 | (South Korea) Song Kang-ho | Thirst | 박쥐 Bakjwi | |
| 2010 | (Japan) Hitoshi Matsumoto | Symbol | しんぼる | |
| 2011 | (South Korea) Ha Jung-woo | The Yellow Sea | 황해, Hwang hae | |
| 2011 | (Hong Kong) Chow Yun-fat | Let the Bullets Fly | 让子弹飞, Ràng Zǐ Dàn Fēi | |
| 2011 | (China) Ge You | Sacrifice | 赵氏孤儿 Zhào Shì Gū Ér | |
| 2011 | (Taiwan) Ethan Juan | Monga | 艋舺 Báng-kah | |
| 2011 | (Japan) Koji Yakusho | 13 Assassins | 十三人の刺客 Jūsannin no Shikaku | |
| 2012 | (Indonesia) Donny Damara | Lovely Man | | |
| 2012 | (China) Chen Kun | Flying Swords of Dragon Gate | 龙门飞甲 | |
| 2012 | (Hong Kong) Andy Lau | A Simple Life | 桃姐 Táo Jiě | |
| 2012 | (South Korea) Park Hae-il | War of the Arrows | 최종병기 활 Choechongp'yŏngki Hwal | |
| 2012 | (Japan) Koji Yakusho | Chronicle of My Mother | わが母の記 Waga Haha no Ki | |
| 2013 | (Philippines) Eddie Garcia | Bwakaw | | |
| 2013 | (Taiwan) Joseph Chang | Girlfriend, Boyfriend | 女朋友。男朋友 | |
| 2013 | (South Korea) Choi Min-sik | Nameless Gangster: Rules of the Time | 범죄와의 전쟁 Bumchoiwaui Junjaeng | |
| 2013 | (Hong Kong) Tony Leung Ka-fai | Cold War | 寒戰 | |
| 2013 | (China) Liu Ye | The Last Supper | 王的盛宴 | |
| 2014 | (India) Irrfan Khan | The Lunchbox | | |
| 2014 | (Japan) Masaharu Fukuyama | Like Father, Like Son | そして父になる Soshite Chichi ni Naru | |
| 2014 | (Taiwan) Lee Kang-sheng | Stray Dogs | | |
| 2014 | (Hong Kong) Tony Leung Chiu-Wai | The Grandmaster | 一代宗師 | |
| 2014 | (South Korea) Song Kang-ho | The Attorney | 변호인 Byeonhoin | |
| 2015 | (China) Liao Fan | Black Coal, Thin Ice | 白日焰火 | |
| 2015 | (South Korea) Choi Min-sik | The Admiral: Roaring Currents | 명량 | |
| 2015 | (Japan) Ryo Kase | Hill of Freedom | 자유의 언덕 | |
| 2015 | (Hong Kong) Sean Lau Ching-wan | Overheard 3 | 竊聽風雲3 | |
| 2015 | (Taiwan) Ethan Ruan | Paradise in Service | 軍中樂園 | |
| 2015 | (Japan) Takeru Satoh | Rurouni Kenshin: The Legend Ends | るろうに剣心 伝説の最期編 | |
| 2016 | (South Korea) Lee Byung-hun | Inside Men | 내부자들 | |
| 2016 | (Philippines) John Arcilla | Heneral Luna | | |
| 2016 | (Japan) Masatoshi Nagase | Sweet Bean | あん | |
| 2016 | (China) Feng Xiaogang | Mr. Six | 老炮兒 | |
| 2016 | (Hong Kong) Donnie Yen | Ip Man 3 | 葉問3 | |
| 2017 | (Japan) Tadanobu Asano | Harmonium | 淵に立つ | |
| 2017 | (Hong Kong) Michael Hui | Godspeed | 一路顺风 | |
| 2017 | (South Korea) Gong Yoo | Train to Busan | 부산행 | |
| 2017 | (China) Fan Wei | Mr. No Problem | 不成问题的问题 | |
| 2017 | (Taiwan) Richie Jen | Trivisa | 树大招风 | |
| 2018 | (Hong Kong) Louis Koo | Paradox | 杀破狼・贪狼 | |
| 2018 | (South Korea) Kim Yoon-seok | 1987: When the Day Comes | 1987 | |
| 2018 | (Thailand) Sukollawat Kanarot | Malila: The Farewell Flower | | |
| 2018 | (India) Rajkummar Rao | Newton | | |
| 2018 | (China) Duan Yihong | The Looming Storm | 暴雪将至 | |
| 2019 | (Japan) Koji Yakusho | The Blood of Wolves | 孤狼の血 | |
| 2019 | (South Korea) Yoo Ah-in | Burning | 버닝 | |
| 2019 | (China) Xu Zheng | Dying to Survive | 我不是藥神 | |
| 2019 | (Hong Kong) (China) Aaron Kwok | Project Gutenberg | 無雙 | |
| 2019 | (India) Ranbir Kapoor | Sanju | | |

=== 2020s ===
| Year | Actor | English title | Original title | Ref. |
|---|---|---|---|---|
| 2020 | (South Korea) Lee Byung-hun | The Man Standing Next | 남산의 부장들 | |
| 2020 | (Iran) Hamed Behdad | Castle of Dreams | قصر شیرین | |
| 2020 | (Taiwan) Chen Yi-wen | A Sun | 陽光普照 | |
| 2020 | (Japan) Masataka Kubota | First Love | 初恋 | |
| 2020 | (Hong Kong) (Taiwan) Tai Bo | Twilight's Kiss | 叔．叔 | |
| 2020 | (China) Wang Jingchun | So Long, My Son | 地久天长 | |
| 2021 | (South Korea) Yoo Ah-in | Voice of Silence | 소리도 없이 | |
| 2021 | (Japan) Koji Yakusho | Under the Open Sky | すばらしき世界 | |
| 2021 | (Taiwan) Mo Tzu-yi | Dear Tenant | 親愛的房客 | |
| 2021 | (China) Zhang Yi | One Second | 一秒钟 | |
| 2021 | (Hong Kong) Lam Ka Tung | Limbo | 智齒 | |
| 2023 | (Hong Kong) Tony Leung Chiu-wai | Where the Wind Blows | 風再起時 | |
| 2023 | (China) Zhang Yi | Home Coming | 萬里歸途 | |
| 2023 | (South Korea) Park Hae-il | Decision to Leave | 헤어질 결심 | |
| 2023 | (Japan) Hidetoshi Nishijima | Drive My Car | ドライブ・マイ・カー | |
| 2023 | (Iran) Mohsen Tanabandeh | World War III | جنگ جهانی سوم | |
| 2023 | (Japan) Ryohei Suzuki | Egoists | エゴイスト | |
| 2024 | (Japan) Koji Yakusho | Perfect Days | | |
| 2024 | (South Korea) Hwang Jung-min | 12.12: The Day | 서울의 봄 | |
| 2024 | (Taiwan) Wu Kang-ren | Abang Adik | | |
| 2024 | (Hong Kong) Tony Leung Chiu-wai | The Goldfinger | 金手指 | |
| 2024 | (China) Shen Teng | Full River Red | 满江红 | |
| 2025 | (Hong Kong) Sean Lau | Papa | 爸爸 | |
| 2025 | (China) Eddie Peng | Black Dog | 狗阵 | |
| 2025 | (South Korea) Choi Min-sik | Exhuma | 파묘 | |
| 2025 | (Japan) Kyōzō Nagatsuka | Teki Cometh | 敵 | |
| 2025 | (Hong Kong) Michael Hui | The Last Dance | 破·地獄 | |
| 2026 | No award given | | | |

== See also ==
- Academy Award for Best Actor
- Blue Dragon Film Award for Best Actor
- European Film Award for Best Actor
- Golden Horse Award for Best Leading Actor
- Hong Kong Film Award for Best Actor
- Japan Academy Film Prize for Outstanding Performance by an Actor in a Leading Role
