= Why Try to Change Me Now =

Chinese crime TV series

- 平原上的摩西
- Genre: suspense, crime
- Based on: Moses on the Plain by Shuang Xuetao
- Directed by: Zhang Dalei
- Starring: Dong Zijian; Hai Qing; Qiu Tian; Dong Baoshi
- Country of origin: China
- Original language: Mandarin
- No. of episodes: 6

Production
- Executive producer: Diao Yinan
- Production location: China
- Running time: 70 minutes
- Production company: iQIYI

Original release
- Network: iQIYI
- Release: January 16 – January 19, 2023

Related
- Fire on the Plain

Why Try to Change Me Now is a Chinese suspense crime TV series directed by Zhang Dalei. The series is an adaptation of the novel Moses on the Plain by Shuang Xuetao. It stars Dong Zijian, Hai Qing, Qiu Tian and Dong Baoshi. The series aired on iQIYI from January 16 to January 19, 2023. It is the first Chinese language TV series nominated in Berlinale Series section.

== Cast and characters ==
- Dong Zijian as Zhuang Shu

A rookie police officer, the son of Dongxin Fu and Dezeng Zhuang

- Hai Qing as Fu Dongxin

The mother of Zhuang Shu. Her father, a professor, was beaten to deaf in Cultural Revolution. She loves art and doesn't share the similar interests with her husband Zhuang Dezeng.

- Qiu Tian as Li Fei

A childhood friend of Zhuang Shu. She shares the similar interests in art with Fu Dongxin. She lost one leg on Christmas Eve, 1996.

- Dong Baoshi as Zhuang Dezeng

The father of Zhuang Shu. He was a factory colleague of Li Shoulian and became a rich businessman in late 1990s.

- Zhang Chen as Zhao Xiaodong

A police office, the mentor of Zhuang Shu in police.

- Liang Jingdong as Li Shoulian

The father of Li Fei. He lost job in 1996.

- Wang Zheng as Jiang Bufan

A police captain, the mentor of Zhao Xiaodong. He was dead on Christmas Eve, 1996.

- Zhang Ninghao as Sun Tianfu

A doctor who runs a small clinic in Chinese medicine, the boyfriend of Li Fei

== Episodes ==
No.	Storyline background change	Key case(s)	Original release date
1	1980s→1996	The murder of a brewery couple, The burning of a taxi driver	16 January 2023
In 1980s, Fu dongxin was introduced to a factory worker Zhuang Dezeng. They got married and have a son - Zhuang Shu. In the element school, a girl Li Fei was interested in art and learnt from Fu Dongxin. On the graduation day of element school, 1996, a murder happened in the city. The owner of a brewery and his wife were found dead in their apartment. On another night, a taxi was set on fire in the wild.
2	1996	The murder of Captain Jiang	16 January 2023
The police found a dead taxi driver in the burnt taxi. After investigation, the police found that all 3 victims were stabbed to death by a thin-bladed knife. The state-owned factory laid-off workers. As consequence, Zhuang's father went to South China for business, while Li Fei's family moved to another place. One day in middle school, Li Fei met Zhuang Shu again. She promised to set off fireworks for Zhuang Shu on Christmas Eve, saying it is a gift for him. In order to catch the murderer, police officers pretended as taxi drivers and hanged around in street. On Christmas Eve, 1996, the police captain Jiang Bufan conducted the "taxi driver" duty alone. Li Fei and Li Shoulian got in the Jiang's taxi. In the halfway, Jiang suspected Li Shoulian as the murderer. Captain Jiang ordered Li Shoulian to step out of car, leaving Li Fei alone in car. Captain Jiang and Li Shoulian fought outside the car. Suddenly, a truck hit and turned over the car. And the same time, a gunshot was fired, and captain Jiang was dead.
3	1999→2003	The murder of a Chengguan officer	16 January 2023
In 1999, Zhuang Shu was caught due to street fight and criticized by a police officer. Later on, Zhuang Shu learned that this police officer got killed. Zhuang Shu was changed by this incident and decided to become a police officer. In 2003, Zhuang Shu graduated from a police school and joined the local police station. His mentor Zhao Xiaodong was still investigating the murder of Captain Jiang that happened 7 years ago. One day in 2003, a Chengguan officer was murdered by knife.
4	2003	The murder of the second Chengguan officer	17 January 2023
Li Fei lost one leg since 1996 and lived with her boy friend, Doctor Sun Tianfu. Another Chengguan officer was shot to death. The police found it was from the same gun that Captain Jiang lost in 1996. Zhao Xiaodong and Zhuang Shu kept investigating the murder of Captain Jiang.
5	2003	The violent struggle against Fu Dongxin's father	18 January 2023
Zhao Xiaodong and Zhuang Shu went to Doctor Sun's clinic for investigation but found nobody. Doctor Sun and Li Fei prepared to flee to Mongolia. Zhao and Zhuang reached out ex-mother of Doctor Sun. Years ago, she took all money away and abandoned Sun's family. She told police the sponsor of Sun's clinic was a person name "Li Shouwang" and has a daughter called "Little Fei". Zhuang immediately realized that it was Li Fei. Zhao urged to arrest Li Shoulian and Li Fei, but Zhuang considered his past with Fei and strongly objected. Doctor Sun's clinic was sold out and under re-construction; Zhuang found a bloody pillow there and discovered Li Fei's Diary inside. After reading her diary, Zhuang knew the hidden past the families of Zhuang and Li. Zhuang Dezeng once joined beating to Fu's father in Cultural Revolution. Inside the diary, Zhuang found an unfold cigarette carton. The brand of the cigarette matches the one found in Captain Jiang's jacket.
6	2003	The suicide of Li Fei	19 January 2023
Zhao Xiaodong finally caught a murder name Zhao Qingge. Zhao Qingge pleaded guilty to The murder of a brewery couple and the burning of a taxi driver, but denied the murder of Captain Jiang. Zhuang's family gather together to celebrate Fu Dongxin's birthday. Fu Dongxin asked Zhuang Dezeng to sign the divorce agreement and then left the city. Li Fei was about to fleeing way but saw a missing person notice issued by "Lille Shu". Li Fei suspend plan and decided to meet Zhuang Shu. In the park, Li Fei and Zhuang Shu each rowed a boat on the pond. Li told all truth of 1996 Christmas Eve. She questioned Zhuang whether he went to their firework dating on that Christmas Eve. Zhuang hid his truth but told Li that he totally forget their dating. Li laughed desperately and shot herself to death. At the end, Zhao Qingge and Li Shoulian were sentenced to death.

== Production ==
In December 2021, the series announced the cast crew.

The series was shot in Hohhot, Inner Mongolia. A number of landmarks were involved, such as Hohhot People's Stadium and Qingcheng Park. The filming took more than 70 days.

== Release ==
On December 18, 2022, the series was officially announced as a part of iQIYI Mist Theater (迷雾剧场). A teaser trailer mixing 5 Mist Theater series was released on the same day.

On January 10, 2023, its web-distributed license was issued by China National Radio and Television Administration. On January 16, 2023, the series released the first trailer. On the same day, the streaming started on iQIYI .

== Awards and nominations ==
Year	Award	Category	Nominee	Result	Ref.
2023	73rd Berlin International Film Festival	Berlinale Series	Why Try to Change Me Now	Nominated	
