= Ning Hao =

Chinese film director (born 1977)

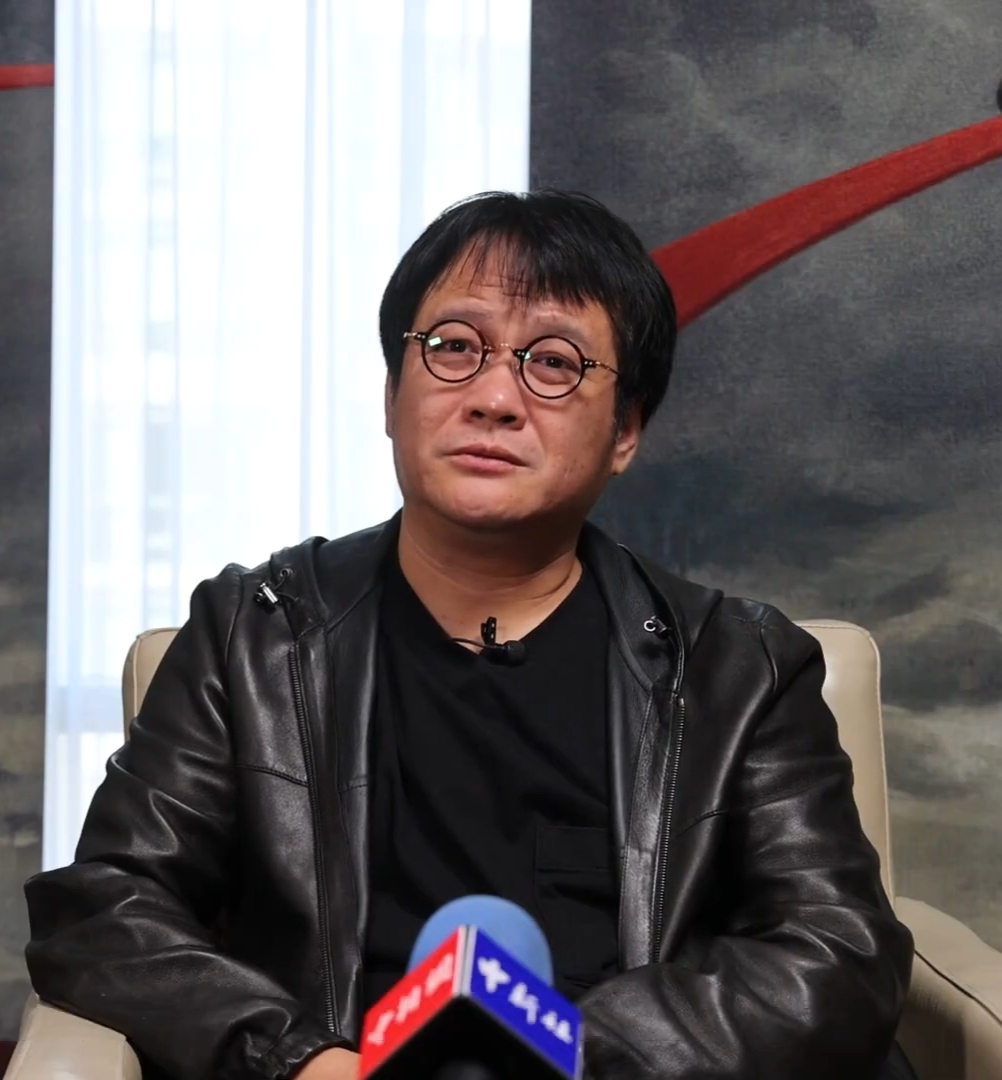
- Ning in 2023
- Born: 9 September 1977 (age 48); Taiyuan, Shanxi, China
- Occupation: Film director
- Spouse: Xing Aina
- Children: 1 son (born 2009)
- Awards: Huabiao Award for Outstanding New Director; 2007 Crazy Stone

Chinese name
- Traditional Chinese: 甯浩
- Simplified Chinese: 宁浩
Transcriptions
Standard Mandarin
- Hanyu Pinyin: Nìng Hào

Ning Hao (Chinese: 宁浩; born 9 September 1977) is a Chinese film director. Ning studied at the Taiyuan Film School, where he majored in scenic design. He later transferred to the Art Department of Peking University. Ning eventually graduated from the Beijing Film Academy in 2003 with a degree from the Photography Department.

== Filmography ==
Year	English Title	Chinese Title	Notes/Ref.
2001	Thursday, Wednesday	星期四，星期三	
2003	Incense	香火	Graduation film for the Beijing Film Academy
2004	Mongolian Ping Pong	绿草地	
2006	Crazy Stone	疯狂的石头	
2009	Crazy Racer	疯狂的赛车	Also known as Silver Medalist
2012	Guns and Roses	黄金大劫案	
2013	No Man's Land	无人区	Also known as Western Sunshine, filmed in 2010
2014	Breakup Buddies	心花路放	
2019	Crazy Alien	疯狂的外星人	
2019	My People, My Country	我和我的祖国	Co-director
2023	The Movie Emperor	紅毯先生	
2024	The Hutong Cowboy	爆款好人	Produced and Co-director
2026	Once Upon a Time in the Middle East	欢迎来龙餐馆	Producer

=== Casting ===
Since his breakout in 2006, Ning frequently re-casts actors who he has worked with, especially Huang Bo and Xu Zheng (as well as himself in cameo roles):

Actor	Crazy Stone	Crazy Racer	Guns and Roses	No Man's Land	Breakup Buddies	Crazy Alien
himself	X mark	X mark	X mark	X mark	X mark	
Huang Bo	X mark	X mark	X mark	X mark	X mark	X mark
Xu Zheng	X mark	X mark		X mark	X mark	X mark
Guo Tao	X mark		X mark		X mark	
Yue Xiaojun	X mark		X mark		X mark	
Wang Xun	X mark	X mark				
Liu Gang	X mark	X mark				
Liu Hua	X mark		X mark			X mark
Dong Lifan		X mark	X mark			
Wang Shuangbao		X mark		X mark		
Ba Duo		X mark		X mark		
Tao Hong			X mark	X mark		
Yang Xinming			X mark	X mark		
Lei Jiayin			X mark		X mark	X mark
Shen Teng					X mark	X mark

== Controversy ==
In March 2018, a video surfaced showing a dog being abused on the set of the Hao-directed movie Crazy Alien. In the video, the dog was shown being spun around in a cage and dumped into cold water. The video was taped by a member of the movie crew. A whistleblower claimed that between shots, the dog was worked into a frenzy so he would bark as loudly as possible, and that this had been done on several takes. The director did not give a statement, but Crazy Alien actor Matthew Morrison said he was heartbroken about the abuse.

== Personal life ==
Ning Hao is married to Xing Aina, who is credited as a screenwriter in all his films since Guns and Roses and No Man's Land. They have a son together.
