= Crazy Dinner Party =

- Film poster
- Traditional Chinese: 飯局也瘋狂
- Simplified Chinese: 饭局也疯狂
- Hanyu Pinyin: Fànjuú Yě Fēngkuáng
- Directed by: Shang Jing
- Written by: Yu Baimei
- Produced by: Shang Min; Zhao Chao; Peng Mingyu
- Starring: Fan Wei; Huang Bo; Liu Hua; Monica Mok; Liang Guanhua; Han Tongsheng
- Cinematography: Wang Yu
- Edited by: Zhang Yifan
- Music by: Tao Jing
- Production companies: China Film Group Corporation; China Vision Media Group
- Distributed by: China Film Group Corporation
- Release date: 23 January 2012 (China)
- Running time: 100 minutes
- Country: China
- Language: Mandarin

Crazy Dinner Party (Chinese: 饭局也疯狂) is a 2012 Chinese comedy film written by Yu Baimei and directed by Shang Jing. The film stars Fan Wei, Huang Bo, Liu Hua, Monica Mok, Liang Guanhua, and Han Tongsheng. Crazy Dinner Party is produced jointly by China Film Group Corporation and China Vision Media Group. The film premiered in China on January 23, 2012, during the Chinese New Year.

== Cast ==
- Fan Wei as Master Tan
- Huang Bo as Jia Ming
- Liu Hua as Businessman Feng
- Monica Mok as Monica
- Liang Guanhua as Lao Mei
- Han Tongsheng
- Liu Yajin as Cai Jinya
- Baduo as Lao Xiami
- Feng Li as Gou Gou
- Dai Lele as Xiao Hudie
- Chen Yuemo as Xiao Ke
- Zhang Yiluan as Xiao Mei
- Shen Junyi
- Liu Yiwei

== Release ==
The film was released on January 23, 2012, in China.
