= Xianghuo =

Xianghuo (Chinese: 香火) may refer to:

- Incense (film), a 2003 Chinese film
- The Descendant, a 2012 Malaysian TV series
