= Mad World (film) =

2016 Hong Kong film by Wong Chun

- Theatrical release poster
- Chinese: 一念無明
- Directed by: Wong Chun
- Written by: Florence Chan
- Produced by: Derek Chiu; Heiward Mak
- Starring: Shawn Yue; Eric Tsang; Elaine Jin; Charmaine Fong
- Cinematography: Zhang Ying
- Edited by: Wong Chun
- Music by: Yusuke Hatano
- Production company: Mad World Limited
- Distributed by: Golden Scene
- Release dates: 8 September 2016 (TIFF); 30 March 2017 (Hong Kong)
- Running time: 101 minutes
- Country: Hong Kong
- Language: Cantonese
- Budget: US$258,000
- Box office: US$1.8 million

Mad World (Cantonese: 一念無明 /niːm²¹mou²¹miŋ²¹/) is a 2016 Hong Kong drama film directed by Wong Chun and starring Shawn Yue, Eric Tsang, Elaine Jin and Charmaine Fong. It is Wong's directorial debut after winning the First Feature Film Initiative. It was selected as the Hong Kong entry for the Best Foreign Language Film at the 90th Academy Awards, but it was not nominated.

== Premise ==
Tung, a former financial analyst who is struggling with bipolar disorder, is placed in the custody of his truck-driver father after being discharged from a mental health institution.

== Cast ==
- Shawn Yue as Tung—a mentally ill stockbroker
- Eric Tsang as Tung's father—a cross-town trucker who takes in his son
- Elaine Jin as Tung's mother—mentally ill woman who was killed by her son
- Charmaine Fong as Jenny—Tung's former fiancée
- Wong Chun as Tung's younger brother (voice)

== Development ==
Wong and Chan cited Cageman (1992), about an impoverished community living in cage homes, as a major influence.

== Production ==
The film was shot in 16 days, mostly on location in subdivided flats, and with a budget of around US$257,000. As the film was selected by the First Feature Film Initiative (along with Weeds on Fire and Opus 1), they were unable to procure outside investments. Actors Eric Tsang and Shawn Yue both waived their salaries when they joined the cast.

== Release ==
The film premiered at the 2016 Toronto International Film Festival. It opened in Hong Kong cinemas on 30 March 2017. The film grossed almost 10x its budget in theaters. A fraction of the profits were used to compensate actors Eric Tsang and Shawn Yue, who waived their salaries, and the few crew members who worked for free.

== Reception ==
Clarence Tsui for The Hollywood Reporter wrote, "While not exactly a full-fledged success, Mad World offers an intimate showcase of a promising director, an actor who can do much more than he’s usually asked to, and a kind of non-manic storytelling that pays for those who are patient enough to pay attention." Edmund Lee of the South China Morning Post gave the film 3.5/5 stars. He wrote, "Mad World is not quite the profound reflection of reality its makers intended it to be, but despite its flaws this is a brave film."

The film was selected as the Hong Kong entry for the Best Foreign Language Film at the 90th Academy Awards, but it was not nominated.

== Awards and nominations ==
Award ceremony	Category	Recipients	Result	Notes
53rd Golden Horse Awards	Best Supporting Actress	Elaine Jin	Won	
53rd Golden Horse Awards	Best Supporting Actor	Eric Tsang	Nominated	
53rd Golden Horse Awards	Best New Director	Wong Chun	Won	
12th Hong Kong Film Directors' Guild Awards	Best New Director	Wong Chun	Won	
1st Malaysia Golden Global Awards	Best Film	Mad World	Nominated	
1st Malaysia Golden Global Awards	Best Actor	Eric Tsang	Won	
1st Malaysia Golden Global Awards	Best Screenplay	Florence Chan	Nominated	
1st Malaysia Golden Global Awards	Best Cinematography	Zhang Ying	Nominated	
23rd Hong Kong Film Critics Society Award	Best Film	Mad World	Nominated	
23rd Hong Kong Film Critics Society Award	Best Director	Wong Chun	Won	
23rd Hong Kong Film Critics Society Award	Best Screenplay	Florence Chan	Won	
23rd Hong Kong Film Critics Society Award	Best Actor	Shawn Yue	Nominated	
23rd Hong Kong Film Critics Society Award	Best Actor	Eric Tsang	Nominated	
23rd Hong Kong Film Critics Society Award	Best Actress	Elaine Jin	Nominated	
23rd Hong Kong Film Critics Society Award	Best Actress	Charmaine Fong	Nominated	
23rd Hong Kong Film Critics Society Award	Film of Merit	Mad World	Won	
12th Osaka Asian Film Festival	Grand Prix	Mad World	Won	
11th Asian Film Awards	Best Supporting Actress	Elaine Jin	Nominated	
Youth Film Handbook Awards	Award for Excellence	Mad World	Won	
Youth Film Handbook Awards	Best Supporting Actress	Elaine Jin	Won	
36th Hong Kong Film Awards	Best Director	Wong Chun	Nominated	
36th Hong Kong Film Awards	Best Screenplay	Florence Chan	Nominated	
36th Hong Kong Film Awards	Best Actor	Shawn Yue	Nominated	
36th Hong Kong Film Awards	Best Supporting Actor	Eric Tsang	Won	
36th Hong Kong Film Awards	Best Supporting Actress	Charmaine Fong	Nominated	
36th Hong Kong Film Awards	Best Supporting Actress	Elaine Jin	Won	
36th Hong Kong Film Awards	Best Original Film Score	Yusuke Hatano	Nominated	
36th Hong Kong Film Awards	Best New Director	Wong Chun	Won	
17th Chinese Film Media Awards	Best Actor	Shawn Yue	Nominated	
17th Chinese Film Media Awards	Best Screenplay	Florence Chan	Nominated	
17th Chinese Film Media Awards	Best New Director	Wong Chun	Nominated	
17th Chinese Film Media Awards	Best Supporting Actor	Eric Tsang	Nominated	
17th Chinese Film Media Awards	Best Supporting Actress	Elaine Jin	Nominated	
17th Chinese Film Media Awards	Best Supporting Actress	Charmaine Fong	Nominated	

== See also ==
- List of submissions to the 90th Academy Awards for Best Foreign Language Film
- List of Hong Kong submissions for the Academy Award for Best Foreign Language Film
