= Mr. No Problem =

2016 film

- Film poster
- Directed by: Mei Feng
- Screenplay by: Huang Shi; Mei Feng
- Based on: 1943 novella by Lao She
- Produced by: Alexandra Lebret; Xin Zheng; Chow Keung; Ning Sun
- Starring: Fan Wei; Yin Tao; Zhang Chao; Shi Yihong
- Cinematography: Zhu Jinjing
- Edited by: Liao Ching-Sung
- Production companies: China Movie Channel; Youth Film Studio; Beijing Jingxi Culture & Tourism Co., Ltd.
- Release dates: 2016 (Tokyo International Film Festival); November 21, 2017 (China)
- Running time: 144 minutes
- Country: China
- Language: Chinese

Mr. No Problem (Chinese: 不成问题的问题), is a 2016 Chinese black-and-white film directed by screenwriter Mei Feng in his directorial debut, based on a 1943 novella by Lao She. Starring Fan Wei, Yin Tao, Zhang Chao and Shi Yihong, Mr. No Problem was screened first at the 2016 Tokyo International Film Festival, and on 21 November 2017 in China.

== Cast ==
- Fan Wei as Ding Wuyuan (丁务源), the third and fifth director of Shuhua farm (树华农场)
- Zhang Chao as Qin Miaozhai (秦妙斋)
- Wang Hanbang as You Daxing (尤大兴), the fourth director of Shuhua farm
- Yin Tao as Mingxia (明霞), wife of You Daxing
- Jiang Zhongwei as Li Sanming (李三明), accountant of Shuhua farm
- Shi Yihong

== Awards and nominations ==
Year	#	Award	Category	Individual	Result
2016	29th	Tokyo International Film Festival	Grand Prix		Nominated
2016	29th	Tokyo International Film Festival	Best Artistic Contribution Award	Mei Feng	Won
2016	53rd	Golden Horse Awards	Best Leading Actor	Fan Wei	Won
2016	53rd	Golden Horse Awards	Best Adapted Screenplay	Mei Feng, Huang Shi	Won
2017	14th	China Movie Channel Media Awards	Best Film		Nominated
2017	14th	China Movie Channel Media Awards	Best Supporting Actor	Zhang Chao	Won
2017	11th	Asian Film Awards	Best Actor	Fan Wei	Nominated
2017	11th	Asian Film Awards	Best Cinematographer	Zhu Jinjing	Nominated
2017	7th	Beijing International Film Festival	Best Feature Film		Nominated
2017	7th	Beijing International Film Festival	Best Actor	Fan Wei	Won
2017	7th	Beijing International Film Festival	Best Screenwriter	Mei Feng, Huang Shi	Won
2018	25th	Beijing College Student Film Festival	Best Art Exploration		Won
2018	25th	Beijing College Student Film Festival	Best Actor	Fan Wei	Nominated
2018	25th	Beijing College Student Film Festival	Best Screenwriter	Mei Feng, Huang Shi	Nominated
2018	9th	China Film Director's Guild Awards	Best Actor	Fan Wei	Nominated
2018	9th	China Film Director's Guild Awards	Best Screenwriter	Mei Feng, Huang Shi	Nominated
2018	27th	Shanghai Film Critics Awards	Best New Director	Mei Feng	Won
