= 11th Asian Film Awards =

2017 edition of award ceremony

- Date: March 21, 2017
- Site: Hong Kong Cultural Centre
- Hosted by: Cyrus Chow, Yoyo Mung

Highlights
- Best Film: I Am Not Madame Bovary
- Most awards: The Handmaiden (4)
- Most nominations: The Handmaiden (6)

Television coverage
- Network: TVB J2

The 11th Asian Film Awards are the 2017 edition of the Asian Film Awards. The ceremony was held on March 21, 2017, at the Cultural Centre in Hong Kong.

== Winners and nominees ==
Best Film	Best Director
I Am Not Madame Bovary (China); The Wailing (South Korea); The Age of Shadows (South Korea); Harmonium (Japan); Godspeed (Taiwan)	Na Hong-jin – The Wailing (South Korea); Kōji Fukada – Harmonium (Japan); Derek Tsang – Soul Mate (Hong Kong); Feng Xiaogang – I Am Not Madame Bovary (China); Lav Diaz – The Woman Who Left (Philippines)
Best Actor	Best Actress
Asano Tadanobu – Harmonium (Japan); Michael Hui – Godspeed (Hong Kong); Gong Yoo – Train to Busan (South Korea); Fan Wei – Mr. No Problem (China); Richie Jen – Trivisa (Taiwan)	Fan Bingbing – I Am Not Madame Bovary (China); Son Ye-jin – The Last Princess (South Korea); Haru Kuroki – A Bride for Rip Van Winkle (Japan); Kara Hui – Happiness (Hong Kong); Charo Santos-Concio – The Woman Who Left (Philippines)
Best Supporting Actor	Best Supporting Actress
Lam Suet – Trivisa (Hong Kong); Jun Kunimura – The Wailing (Japan); Ma Dong-seok – Train to Busan (South Korea); Gō Ayano – Rage (Japan); Dong Chengpeng – I Am Not Madame Bovary (China)	Moon So-ri – The Handmaiden (South Korea); Elaine Jin – Mad World (Hong Kong); Atsuko Maeda – The Mohican Comes Home (Japan); Shabana Azmi – Neerja (India); Lynn Hung – See You Tomorrow (China)
Best Newcomer	Best Screenplay
Kim Tae-ri – The Handmaiden (South Korea); Takara Sakumoto – Rage (Japan); Fir Rahman – Apprentice (Singapore); Tony Wu – Weeds on Fire (Hong Kong); Lin Yun – The Mermaid (China)	Asghar Farhadi – The Salesman (Iran); Lav Diaz – The Woman Who Left (Philippines); Makoto Shinkai – Your Name (Japan); Park Chan-wook, Chung Seo-kyung – The Handmaiden (South Korea); Mak Tin-shu, Loong Man-hong, Thomas Ng – Trivisa (Hong Kong)
Best Cinematographer	Best Production Designer
Luo Pan – I Am Not Madame Bovary (China); Yutaka Yamazaki – After the Storm (Japan); Kim Ji-yong – The Age of Shadows (South Korea); Zhu Jinjing – Mr. No Problem (China); Du Jie – The Wasted Times (China)	Ryu Seong-hui – The Handmaiden (South Korea); Kang Seung-yong – Pandora (South Korea); Kyôko Heya – A Bride for Rip Van Winkle (Japan); Alfred Yau – See You Tomorrow (Hong Kong); Feng Ligang – Railroad Tigers (China)
Best Composer	Best Editor
Mowg – The Age of Shadows (South Korea); Ryuichi Sakamoto – Rage (Japan); Yusuke Hatano, Peter Kam – Soul Mate (Hong Kong) / (China); Xavier Jamaux – Three (Hong Kong); Tseng Si-ming – Godspeed (Taiwan)	Lee Chatametikool, Natalie Soh – Apprentice (Singapore) / (Germany) / (France) / (Hong Kong) / (Qatar); David Richardson – Operation Mekong (Hong Kong) / (China); Kim Jae-bum, Kim Sang-bum – The Handmaiden (South Korea); Tsuyoshi Imai – Rage (Japan); Yang Jin-mo – Train to Busan (South Korea)
Best Visual Effects	Best Costume Designer
Tetsuo Ohya – Shin Godzilla (Japan); Jung Hwang-su – Train to Busan (South Korea); Sun Li, Sheng Yong, Sam Wang, Sun Jing – Railroad Tigers (China); Perry Kain, Johnny Lin, Thomas Reppen – See You Tomorrow (China) / (Hong Kong)	Jo Sang-gyeong – The Handmaiden (South Korea); Yee Chung-Man – The Wasted Times (China); Kazuko Kurosawa – The Sanada Ten Braves (Japan); Kwon Yoo-jin, Rim Seung-hee – Train to Busan (South Korea); William Chang, Cheung Siu-hong – See You Tomorrow (China) / (Hong Kong)
Best Sound	Rising Star of Asia Award
Fang Tao, Hao Zhiyu – Crosscurrent (China); Kim Dong-han – The Wailing (South Korea); Jun Nakamura – Shin Godzilla (Japan); Kinson Tsang, George Lee – Cold War 2 (Hong Kong) / (China)	Lin Yun (China)
Lifetime Achievement Award	Excellence in Asian Cinema Award
Tsui Hark (Hong Kong)	Sammi Cheng (Hong Kong)
