= Guns and Roses (2012 film) =

- Film poster
- Directed by: Ning Hao
- Written by: Xing Aina; He Ruirui; Zheng Xiaoyang; Yue Xiaojun; Wang Hongwei; Ruan Shisheng
- Produced by: Ning Hao
- Starring: Lei Jiayin; Tao Hong; Cheng Yuanyuan; Keiichi Yamasaki; Guo Tao; Fan Wei; Sun Chun; Liu Hua
- Cinematography: Zhao Fei
- Edited by: Li Dianshi; Yin Zhe; Qiao Aiyu
- Music by: Nathan Wang; Jiang Yongjun
- Release date: 24 April 2012 (China)
- Running time: 108 minutes
- Country: China
- Language: Mandarin
- Box office: ¥153 million (US$24.06 million)

Guns and Roses (Chinese: 黄金大劫案; pinyin: Huángjīn Dà Jié'àn) is a 2012 Chinese film directed by Ning Hao.

== Plot ==
The film is set in the 1930s in Changchun, capital of Manchukuo. A thief, Xiao Dongbei (Lei Jiayin) goes into a cathedral and robs the priest (Fan Wei), claiming that he is a member of the underground revolution. As he is running away, the police capture him. Meanwhile, two rebels go to a cinema to exchange messages, but a witty Japanese colonel, Kōnosuke Toriyama (Keiichi Yamasaki), kills one and captures the other. Xiao Dongbei is given leniency and spends only two days in jail. Sharing a cell with him is the captured rebel, who gives him his clothes as a gift.

Xiao Dongbei goes back to his destitute home where he lives with his old and ailing father (Guo Tao), a veteran of the Boxer Rebellion. He has difficulty paying the rent. He cuts open the shoe and finds a hidden message saying that a shipment of gold is bound for the central bank. The rebels kidnap him and bring him to their base, which is a film studio, since the rebel group is composed of people in the film industry. Dongbei is promised a share of the gold and relays the message. As they are going home, they are chased by Japanese soldiers coming out of a bar, but with the help of the thief, who hides them in the earlier cathedral, they evade the soldiers.

To find out the convoy route, one rebel (Tao Hong), a well known actress, uses her fame to attend a party at the central-bank president's house. She goes to the president's study and tries to copy the map, but her plan is ruined after Xiao Dongbei's father causes a disturbance. Now shunned by the rebels, Xiao Dongbei tries to beg for money. By luck, he runs into Gu Xixi (Cheng Yuanyuan), the daughter of the bank's president. He saves her from an air raid while being injured himself. In gratitude, Gu Xixi takes him into the bank president's home and nurses him, where he is able to draw a copy of that map, leading to his re-acceptance into the rebel group. The rebels buy weapons from country-side bandits, but they mysteriously go missing. Nonetheless, the rebels manage to capture the convoy using deception.

Xiao Dongbei goes home with his own share of the gold, but gets reported by his land-lord. When he flees, Colonel Toriyama captures his father and prepares to execute him, forcing Xiao Dongbei to surrender himself. However, as Colonel Toriyama captures the other rebels, the thief's father overcomes his senility and regains the fighting skills from his youth, overpowering the soldiers and buying the rebels and Xiao Dongbei time to escape. However, he is killed by a stray bullet.

The rebels and Xiao Dongbei attend another party to murder both Colonel Toriyama and the Italian Minister of Finance. The shootout fails and all the rebels are killed, with Xiao Dongbei being captured. The police captain decides to execute Xiao Dongbei informally by shooting him and throwing him into a river, but he ends up being rescued by the priest. He feels immense guilt over the rebels' deaths and refuses an offer by Gu Xixi to flee the city and marry her. Xiao Dongbei does a final operation, this time consisting of charging into the bank in a truck while shooting a sub-machine gun at the Italian Minister of Finance, and then pouring a container of acid into the vault to force the gold to dissolve. The earlier bandits assist him in killing the soldiers sent to stop him, inspired by his suicidal courage. Unfortunately, Colonel Toriyama kills Gu Xixi in retribution before being Xiao Dongbei kills him and throws his body into the acid. The police arrive but could not find Xiao Dongbei, and call off operations.

Heavily changed by all of these events, Xiao Dongbei goes on to give up crime. As he watches a movie in a theater, he grieves over Gu Xixi's death. A butterfly flies out of the theater, and lands on the bouquet of stolen spoons that Xiao Dongbei had made for Gu Xixi, causing it to transform into real roses.

== Cast ==
- Lei Jiayin as Xiao Dongbei (小东北), the thief.
- Cheng Yuanyuan as Gu Xixi (顾茜茜), the daughter of the bank president.
- Tao Hong as Fang Die (芳蝶), a famous actress who works for a group of rebels.
- Guo Tao as Xiao Dongbei's elderly father who loves throwing knives. He was a member of the Boxer Rebellion.
- Keiichi Yamazaki as Colonel Kōnosuke Toriyama (鸟山幸之助), the witty Japanese general who is the antagonist of the film.
- Fan Wei as Priest
- Huang Bo as Jietou Xiongdi (接头兄弟), a rebel.
- Sun Chun as Bai Rongmu (白容慕), a rebel.
- Liu Hua as Wu Ge (五哥), the police chief.
- Yue Xiaojun as Shu Laobian (术老编), a rebel.
- Fu Heng as Guang Jiaozheng (广角郑), a rebel.
- Wang Wen as Da Dao Mu (大导木), a rebel.
- Li Cantian as Producer Wu (制片武), a film-maker who works for a group of rebels.
- Nie Mao as Cha Shui Shu (茶水萧), a rebel.
- Yang Xinming as Gu Xianming (顾宪明), the bank president.
- Dong Lifan as Jin Jie (金姐), the landlady.
- Hisataka Kitaoka as Commander Emon Shin'yū (新右卫门)
- Shin'ichi Takashima as Drunk Soldier
- Kōsei Hata as Commander Yokomichi (横路司令)
- Ning Hao
- Chen Siqin as Drunk Soldier
