= 53rd Golden Horse Awards =

2016 Taiwanese film awards ceremony

- Poster
- Date: November 26, 2016
- Site: Sun Yat-sen Memorial Hall, Taipei, Taiwan
- Hosted by: Matilda Tao
- Preshow hosts: Yang Chien-pei; Calvin Chen
- Organized by: Taipei Golden Horse Film Festival Executive Committee

Highlights
- Best Feature Film: The Summer Is Gone
- Best Director: Feng Xiaogang; I Am Not Madame Bovary
- Best Actor: Fan Wei; Mr. No Problem
- Best Actress: Zhou Dongyu and Ma Sichun; Soul Mate
- Most nominations: Godspeed (8)

Television in Taiwan
- Network: TTV

The 53rd Golden Horse Awards (Mandarin:第53屆金馬獎) took place on November 26, 2016, at the Sun Yat-sen Memorial Hall in Taipei, Taiwan. Organized by the Taipei Golden Horse Film Festival Executive Committee, the awards honored the best films of 2015–16. The ceremony was televised in Taiwan by TTV. Matilda Tao was the host of the ceremony.

== Winners and nominees ==
Winners are listed first, highlighted in boldface.

**Best Feature Film**: **The Summer Is Gone**; Godspeed; Trivisa; I Am Not Madame Bovary; The Road to Mandalay	**Best Documentary**: **Le Moulin**; Small Talk; The Road; Yellowing; City of Jade
**Best Animation Feature** —	**Best Live Action Short Film**: **A Sunny Day**; Fu and Li; Crash; Arnie; Island
**Best Animated Short Film**: **Wander in the Dark**; Baumu; White Tunnel; Löss; Bart	**Best Director**: **Feng Xiaogang — I Am Not Madame Bovary**; Chung Mong-hong — Godspeed; Johnnie To — Three; Derek Tsang — Soul Mate; Midi Z — The Road to Mandalay
**Best Leading Actor**: **Fan Wei — Mr. No Problem**; Tony Leung Ka-fai — Cold War 2; Michael Hui — Godspeed; Jacky Cheung — Heaven in the Dark; Kai Ko — The Road to Mandalay	**Best Leading Actress**: **Zhou Dongyu — Soul Mate**; **Ma Sichun — Soul Mate**; Hsu Wei-ning — The Tag-Along; Fan Bingbing — I Am Not Madame Bovary; Wu Ke-xi — The Road to Mandalay
**Best Supporting Actor**: **Austin Lin — At Cafe 6**; Paul Chun — Book of Love; Nadow Lin — Godspeed; Eric Tsang — Mad World; Lam Suet — Robbery	**Best Supporting Actress**: **Elaine Jin — Mad World**; Wu Yanshu — Book of Love; Liu Bei — Someone to Talk To; Li Xing — The Tenants Downstairs; Lu Yi-ching — Forêt Debussy
**Best New Director**: **Wong Chun — Mad World**; Frank Hui, Jevons Au and Vicky Wong — Trivisa; Cheng Wei-hao — The Tag-Along; Chu Hsien-che — White Ant; Zhang Dalei — The Summer Is Gone	**Best New Performer**: **Kong Weiyi — The Summer Is Gone**; Tony Wu — Weeds on Fire; Buya Watan — Hang in There, Kids!; Annie Chen — White Lies, Black Lies; Kimba — Soul on a String
**Best Original Screenplay**: **Lung Man-hong, Thomas Ng and Mak Tin-shu — Trivisa**; Midi Z — The Road to Mandalay; Laha Mebow — Hang in There, Kids!; Xue Xiaolu and Jiao Huajing — Book of Love; Zhang Dalei — The Summer Is Gone	**Best Adapted Screenplay**: **Mei Feng and Huang Shi — Mr. No Problem**; Fire Lee, He Xin and Frankie Tam — Robbery; Liu Zhenyun — I Am Not Madame Bovary; Lam Wing-sum, Li Yuan, Xu Yi-meng and Wu Nan — Soul Mate; Tashi Dawa and Zhang Yang — Soul on a String
**Best Cinematography**: **Mark Lee Ping Bin — Crosscurrent**; Du Jie — Detective Chinatown; Nagao Nakashima — Godspeed; Guo Daming — Soul on a String; Lu Songye — The Summer Is Gone	**Best Visual Effects**: **Douglas Smith, Sam Wang, Sam Khorshid and Strilen Liu — Mojin: The Lost Legend**; Charles Lee and Chishan Liu — The Tag-Along; Yee Kwok-leung and Raymond Leung — Cold War 2; Zuo Zhi Zhong, Han Ho, Aeolian Yang and Jack Yu — The Tenants Downstairs; Raymond Leung, Yee Kwok-leung and Garrett K. Lam — Ip Man 3
**Best Art Direction**: **Chao Shih-hao — Godspeed**; Li Miao — Detective Chinatown; Kenneth Mak — Ip Man 3; Lo Shun-fu and Premo Fang — One Night Only; Akekarat Homlaor — The Road to Mandalay	**Best Makeup & Costume Design**: **Stanley Cheung — Detective Chinatown**; Hsu Li-wen — Godspeed; Sukie Yip — Trivisa; Dora Ng — Soul Mate; Lei Jing — Soul on a String
**Best Action Choreography**: **Wu Gang — Detective Chinatown**; Shim Jae-won and Yang Kil-yong — Mojin: The Lost Legend; Chin Ka-lok — Cold War 2; Yuen Woo-ping — Ip Man 3; Adam Chan — Mrs K	**Best Original Film Score**: **Lim Giong — City of Jade**; Tseng Si-ming — Godspeed; Xavier Jamaux — Three; Du Wei — I Am Not Madame Bovary; Zhang Jian — Soul on a String
**Best Original Film Song**: **"Arena Cahaya" — Ola Bola**; Composer： Zee Avi and Rendra Zawawi; Lyrics: Zee Avi and Rendra Zawawi; Performer： Zee Avi; "(It's Not A Crime) It's Just What We Do" — Soul Mate; Composer： Leah Dou; Lyrics： Leah Dou; Performer：Leah Dou; "Love Without Words" — Hang in There, Kids!; Composer： Baobu Badulu; Lyrics： Laha Mebow, Yinguyu Yatauyungana; Performer： Lin Yi-han; "Sawadika" — Detective Chinatown; Composer： Hu Tingyang; Lyrics： Zhao Chenlong; Performer: Nan Zheng Bei Zhan; "It's Cold Without Your Love" — Big Fish & Begonia; Composer： Kiyoshi Yoshida; Lyrics： Liang Xuan; Performer： Lala Hsu	**Best Film Editing**: **Allen Leung and David Richardson — Trivisa**; Lin Wan-yu — Small Talk; Kao Ming-sheng and Wang Ching-Yannick Dauby— The Tag-Along; Cheung Ka-fai — Ip Man 3; Derek Hui, Li Dianshi, Zhou Xiaolin and Tan Xiang-yuan — Soul Mate
**Best Sound Effects**: **Fang Tao and Hao Zhiyu — Crosscurrent**; Huang Ya-li and Yannick Dauby — Le Moulin; Joe Huang — Mountain Cry; Xu Chen, Li Xiaodan, Gao Qiuhui and Ren Dong — The Summer Is Gone; Yang Jiang and Zhao Nan — Soul on a String	**Outstanding Taiwanese Filmmaker of the Year**: **Midi Z**
**Audience Choice Award**: **I Am Not Madame Bovary**	**FIPRESCI Prize**: **The Summer Is Gone**
**Piaget Award**: **The Road to Mandalay**	**Lifetime Achievement Award**: **Chang Yung-hsiang**
