= Godspeed (film) =

- Film poster
- Traditional Chinese: 一路順風
- Simplified Chinese: 一路顺风
- Hanyu Pinyin: Yī Lù Shùn Fēng
- Jyutping: Jaat1 Lou6 Syun6 Fung1
- Directed by: Chung Mong-hong
- Screenplay by: Chung Mong-hong
- Produced by: Yeh Ju-feng; Tseng Shao-chien
- Starring: Michael Hui; Nadow; Leon Dai; Tou Chung-hwa; Matt Wu; Vincent Liang; Chen Yi Wen; Vithaya Pansringarm
- Cinematography: Chung Mong-hong
- Edited by: Lai Hsiu-hsiong
- Music by: Tseng Si-ming
- Production companies: 3 NG Film; Taipei Postproduction Corporation; Arrow Cinematic Group; Huace Pictures
- Distributed by: Applause Entertainment
- Release date: 18 November 2016 (Taiwan)
- Running time: 111 minutes
- Country: Taiwan
- Languages: Mandarin; Taiwanese; Cantonese; Thai
- Box office: NT$5.4 million

Godspeed (Chinese: 一路順風) is a 2016 Taiwanese black comedy road caper film written and directed by Chung Mong-hong and starring Michael Hui and Nadow. The film had its world premiere at the 2016 Toronto International Film Festival on 14 September 2016 and was theatrically released in Taiwan on 18 November.

== Plot ==
Nadow (Nadow) is a jobless punk who often engages in stealing and cheating. One day, when he decides to find a stable job, he accidentally becomes a drug trafficker. On one occasion while transporting drugs, Nadow gets onto a taxi driven by Old Hui (Michael Hui), a Hong Konger married to a Taiwanese woman. A failed businessman in the past, Hui's only financial support is his old taxi which not many passengers are willing to ride. Old Hui and Nadow, two people of different backgrounds and personalities, ride down south together.

What begins as an ordinary delivery trip entangles the duo to be entangled in an extortion scheme and a murder involving rival gangs. As their journey takes increasingly dangerous turns, their newfound friendship and mutual trust are put to the test—until they realise, at the height of mortal danger, that the entire ordeal may have been orchestrated from the start.

== Cast ==
=== Starring ===
- Michael Hui as Old Hui (老許)
- Nadow Lin as Nadow (納豆)
- Leon Dai as 大宝
- Tou Chung-hua as Brother Tou (庹哥)
- Matt Wu as Hsiao-wu
- Vicent Liang as Little Liang (小梁)
- Chen Yi Wen as Wen (阿文)
- Vithaya Pansringarm

=== Cameo ===
- Jag Huang as Mourner
- Chung Yi-tseng
- Lin Mei-hsiu as Hui's wife
- Chen Yu-hsun

== Accolades ==
Ceremony	Category	Recipient	Result	Citation(s)
53rd Golden Horse Awards	Best Feature Film	Godspeed	Nominated	
53rd Golden Horse Awards	Best Director	Chung Mong-hong	Nominated	
53rd Golden Horse Awards	Best Actor	Michael Hui	Nominated	
53rd Golden Horse Awards	Best Supporting Actor	Na Dow	Nominated	
53rd Golden Horse Awards	Best Cinematography	Nagao Nakashima	Nominated	
53rd Golden Horse Awards	Best Art Direction	Chao Shih-hao	Won	
53rd Golden Horse Awards	Best Makeup & Costume Design	Hsu Li-wen	Nominated	
53rd Golden Horse Awards	Best Original Film Score	Tseng Si-ming	Nominated	
11th Asian Film Awards	Best Film	Godspeed	Nominated	
11th Asian Film Awards	Best Actor	Michael Hui	Nominated	
11th Asian Film Awards	Best Composer	Tseng Si-ming	Nominated	
36th Hong Kong Film Awards	Best Film from Mainland and Taiwan	Godspeed	Won	
21st Bucheon International Fantastic Film Festival	EFFFF Asian Award	Godspeed	Won	
17th Chinese Film Media Awards	Best Actor	Michael Hui	Nominated	
17th Chinese Film Media Awards	Best Supporting Actor	Na Dow	Nominated	
