= The Summer Is Gone =

The Summer is Gone
- Theatrical release poster
- Traditional Chinese: 八月
- Hanyu Pinyin: bāyuè
- Jyutping: baat3 jyut6
- Directed by: Zhang Dalei
- Written by: Zhang Dalei
- Produced by: Mai Lisi; Zhao Yanming; Suo Yiluo
- Starring: Kong Weiyi; Zhang Chen; Guo Yanyun
- Cinematography: Lü Songye
- Edited by: Zhang Dalei
- Production company: Beijing Mailis Pictures
- Release dates: 23 July 2016; 24 March 2017 (China)
- Running time: 106 minutes
- Country: China
- Language: Mandarin

The Summer is Gone is a 2016 Chinese drama film written and directed by Zhang Dalei. At the 2016 Golden Horse Awards the film won 3 awards for Best Feature Film, Best New Performer and the FIPRESCI Prize. It was released in China on 24 March 2017. The film won the Grand Prix award at the 24th Beijing College Student Film Festival.

== Plot ==
In the early 1990s, in a small western town, Zhang Xiaolei, who had just finished his entrance exam for junior high school, finally welcomed the long-awaited summer vacation without homework. However, this free and hot summer was not as lively as imagined. Instead, it was filled with repetitive family life and plenty of free time. Coincidentally, that year, the country began to implement the transformation of state-owned enterprises, breaking the iron rice bowl. Zhang Xiaolei's father's unit was also impacted by the reform, affecting the lives of every family in their residential compound.

Children were bored all day long, while seemingly calm adults' hearts were as hot as the scorching sun due to the changes. Zhang Xiaolei quietly endured, sensing the subtle changes happening around him. It wasn't until his father, in pursuit of a better life, left for a distant place, leaving only his mother and him behind, that Zhang Xiaolei truly felt the passage of time and the transformation of life.

On the night of the beginning of autumn, the night-blooming cereus in Zhang Xiaolei's yard quietly bloomed, as if implying something....

== Cast ==
- Kong Weiyi as Zhang Xiaolei
- Zhang Chen as Dad
- Guo Yanyuan as Mom

== Awards and nominations ==
Award ceremony	Category	Recipients	Result
53rd Golden Horse Awards	Best Feature Film	The Summer Is Gone	Won
53rd Golden Horse Awards	Best New Director	Zhang Dalei	Nominated
53rd Golden Horse Awards	Best New Performer	Kong Weiyi	Won
53rd Golden Horse Awards	Best Original Screenplay	Zhang Dalei	Nominated
53rd Golden Horse Awards	Best Cinematography	Songye Lü	Nominated
53rd Golden Horse Awards	Best Sound Effects	Chen Xu Xiaodan Li Qiuhui Gao Dong Ren	Nominated
17th Chinese Film Media Awards	Best Director	Zhang Dalei	Nominated
17th Chinese Film Media Awards	Best New Director	Zhang Dalei	Nominated
24th Beijing College Student Film Festival	Best Film	The Summer Is Gone	Nominated
24th Beijing College Student Film Festival	Jury Award	Zhang Dalei	Won
24th Beijing College Student Film Festival	Best Director	Zhang Dalei	Nominated
24th Beijing College Student Film Festival	Best Newcomer	Kong Weiyi	Nominated
24th Beijing College Student Film Festival	Artistic Exploration Award	The Summer Is Gone	Nominated
