= Liu Hua (actor) =

Chinese actor

- 刘桦
- Born: June 1, 1961 (age 65); Beijing, China
- Education: Central Academy of Drama
- Occupation: Actor
- Years active: 1994-present
- Spouse: Jun Du
- Children: 1

Chinese name
- Traditional Chinese: 劉樺
- Simplified Chinese: 刘桦
Transcriptions
Standard Mandarin
- Hanyu Pinyin: Liú Huà

Liu Hua (Chinese: 刘桦; born 1 June 1961) is a Chinese actor. He is noted for his roles as Zhen Chengzong in Under The Temptation, for which he received Best Supporting Actor Award nomination at the 4th Macau International Movie Festival.

== Life ==
=== Early life ===
Liu Hua was born and raised in Beijing. He graduated from Central Academy of Drama, majoring in acting despite not attending Highschool.

=== Acting career ===
Liu made his acting debut in Romance of the Three Kingdoms, playing Pan Feng, a general under Han Fu.

In 1996, he acted in the historical television series Eastern Zhou Dynasty Various Nations directed by Shen Haofang, playing the role of Yi Ya.

Liu Hua's first film role as Brother Dao in Ning Hao's film Crazy Stone (2006). At the same year, he had a supporting role in the film Big Movie, which starred Huang Bo and Yao Chen.

In 2008, he had a cameo appearance in Almost Perfect. He was cast in the film Lost and Found, playing Lao Xing, a policeman. He co-starred with Fan Wei and Ju Wenpei in Set Off as Qun Tou.

In 2009, he appeared in The Founding of a Republic, Panda Express, and Gasp. That same year, he had a minor role in The Eloquent Ji Xiaolan, a historical television series starring Zhang Guoli, Zhang Tielin and Wang Gang.

In 2010, he was cast in the lead role of Linghu Youwei in the Filmko Pictures Beijing and Shenzhen Golden Shores Films's Don Quixote, directed by Ah Gan. He participated in Love Tactics, alongside Chie Tanaka, Qin Hailu, and Chen Xiaodong.

In 2011, he filmed in Wuershan's The Butcher, the Chef and the Swordsman, opposite Masanobu Andō, Zhang Yuqi, and You Benchang. He appeared in Wong Jing's Treasure Hunt, a comedy film starring Cecilia Cheung and Ronald Cheng. He had a minor role as Cheng Ziqing in Huang Jianxin and Han Sanping's The Founding of a Party.

In 2012, he acted with Tao Hong, Guo Tao, Lei Jiayin, and Cheng Yuanyuan in Ning Hao's Guns and Roses. He was cast in the romantic comedy film Dinner Party with Liang Guanhua, Mo Xiaoqi, and Han Tongsheng. He earned his nominated for Best Supporting Actor Award at the 4th Macau International Movie Festival for his performance in Under The Temptation. He played the lead role with Vitas and Eva Huang in One Night To Be Star. He appeared in Happiness Me Too, a romantic comedy film starring Sha Yi, Joe Chen, and Aya Liu.

In 2013, he starred in a television series called Hello 30s with Du Chun and Ma Su. He participated in the romantic comedy television series Wedding Strings, alongside Gao Yuanyuan and Huang Haibo. He co-starred with Xu Fan and Wang Baoqiang in the comedy film I am Director.

In 2014, he had a supporting role as Dragon King of the East Sea in the shenmo film The Monkey King, which starred Donnie Yen, Chow Yun-fat, Aaron Kwok, Joe Chen, and Peter Ho.

== Personal life ==
Liu Hua and his wife have a daughter.

== Filmography ==
=== Film ===
Year	English Title	Chinese Title	Notes
2006	Crazy Stone	疯狂的石头	Brother Dao
2006	Big Movie	大电影之数百亿	The Creditor
2007	Call for Love	爱情呼叫转移	The thief
2008	Lost and Found	我叫刘跃进	The policeman Lao Xing
2008		疯狂的婚礼	
2008	Almost Perfect	十全九美	Hong Gaitian
2008	Set Off	即日启程	Qun Tou
2008	Marriage Trap	婚礼2008	Uncle Guang
2009	The Founding of a Republic	建国大业	Police captain
2009	Owe Me 105000	欠我十万零五千	Brother Xi
2009	Gasp	气喘吁吁	
2009	Royal Tattoo	皇家刺青	
2009	Panda Express	熊猫大侠	Wang Laoji
2009	Glittering Days	万家灯火	
2009	Da You Cun Bright Future	大有前途	Liu Yifeng
2009		冬天不冷	
2010	Love Tactics	爱情三十六计	Shisandou
2010	Don Quixote	魔侠传之唐吉可德	Linghu Youwei
2010	Truth or Dare?	真心话大冒险	
2010	The Island	绝命岛	Boss Long
2010	In a Tangle	一不留神	Hou Mugui
2010	Piratic Love	盗版爱情	
2011	The Butcher, the Chef and the Swordsman	刀见笑	
2011	Treasure Hunt	冠军宝贝之无价之宝	Brother She
2011	The Founding of a Party	建党伟业	Cheng Ziqing
2012	Guns and Roses	黄金大劫案	The Sheriff
2012	Under The Temptation	四戒	Zhen Chengzong
2012	Dinner Party	饭局也疯狂	Businessman
2012		换心迷局	
2012	Happiness Me Too	幸福迷途	Song Anbang
2012	One Night To Be Star	一夜成名	Fan Yule
2012	The Next 11 Days	冰雪11天	Lao Ma
2014	The Monkey King	大闹天宫	Dragon King of the East Sea
2014	The Suspicious	最佳嫌疑人	
2014	Mr. Lucky	好命先生	
2015	Fight Against Landlords	斗地主	
2015	Mr. Six	老炮儿	
2019	Crazy Alien		
2019	Savage		
2023	Never Say Never	八角笼中	

=== Television ===
Year	English Title	Chinese Title	Role	Notes
1994	Romance of the Three Kingdoms	三国演义	Pan Feng	
1996	Eastern Zhou Dynasty Various Nations	东周列国春秋篇	Yi Ya	
2000		贫嘴张大民的幸福生活	Gu Saner	
2001		冬天不冷		
2001		贻笑大方	Pang Xie	
2001		筒子楼	Li Shoucai	
2002		高老头奇遇记		
2003		立案侦查	Zhang Yi	
2003		走过幸福	Liu Ming	
2004		居家男人	The manny	
2004		前门楼子九丈九		
2006	Family Together, Everything Prosper	家和万事兴之抬头见喜		
2008	Love Ensure This Life	情证今生		
2008		迷失洛杉矶		
2009		皇家刺青		
2009		万家灯火		
2009		谍影重重之上海	Du Yuesheng	
2009		本色		
2009	The Eloquent Ji Xiaolan	铁齿铜牙纪晓岚第四部	A businessman	
2010		老牛家的战争	Fu Xiaoning	
2010	County Head Lao Ye	知县叶光明		
2010		岳父也是爹		
2010		高山流水		
2010		疯狂的骗局		
2010		大元奇事		
2011		二号交通站		
2011		青春期撞上更年期	Bai Xiao'ou	
2012	Legend of Pi Wu	义者无敌	Pan Yugui	
2012		迷失的情感		
2012	Standing Year	而立之年		
2013	Hello 30s	30岁，你好		
2013	Wedding Strings	咱们结婚吧		
2014	The Story of Furong	芙蓉诀		
2019	Joy of Life	庆余年	Fei Jie	

== Awards ==
Year	Work	Award	Category	Result	Notes
2012	Under The Temptation	4th Macau International Movie Festival	Best Supporting Actor	Nominated	
