= The Long Season =

- Genre: Drama; Crime
- Based on: Ling Dong Zhi Ren by Yu Xiaoqian
- Written by: Yu Xiaoqian; Pan Yiran; Chen Ji
- Directed by: Xin Shuang
- Starring: Fan Wei; Qin Hao; Chen Minghao
- Theme music composer: Ding Ke
- Country of origin: China
- Original languages: Putonghua; Dongbei dialect
- No. of episodes: 12

Production
- Producer: Zhang Na
- Running time: 41–107 minutes
- Production company: Tencent Penguin Pictures

Original release
- Network: Tencent Video
- Release: April 22 – May 8, 2023

The Long Season (Chinese: 漫长的季节; pinyin: Màncháng de jìjié) is a Chinese television drama produced by Tencent Penguin Pictures. Directed by Xin Shuang, the 12-episode mystery suspense series starred Fan Wei, Qin Hao, and Chen Minghao, Li Gengxi, Liu Yitie, and Jiang Qiming. It tells a story spanning nearly 20 years about multiple characters involved in a dismemberment case at Hualin, a fictional factory town in Northeast China modeled on Anshan. It premiered on Tencent Video on 22 April 2023, and on Jiangsu TV on 11 February 2024.

== Title ==
The screenplay Ling Dong Zhi Ren (lit. 'Blade of the Cold Winter') was written by screenwriter Yu Xiaoqian. The screenwriter and director made substantial modifications to the original screenplay, including changes to Shen Mo's character, the deaths of Wang Yang and Gong Biao, and the conflicts between Wang Xiang and Shen Mo.

The title of the television series, The Long Season, is drawn from the short story of the same name by the production's literary planner Ban Yu. Additionally, the poem "The Long Season" written by the character Wang Yang in the show is also Ban Yu's work. Director Xin Shuang explained in an interview that he chose this title because the character Wang Xiang has been trapped in the autumn following his son Wang Yang's departure. The four seasons represent the cyclical nature of life, akin to the passage of time and the human experience. He aims to use the passage of time, experienced through the character of Wang Xiang, to reflect on the multitude of living beings.

== Synopsis ==
The series is set in the fictional northeastern Chinese city of Hualin (桦林) and revolves around a dismemberment case occurring near the Hualin Steel Plant (桦林钢铁厂), the city's principal heavy industrial enterprise which was undergoing financial difficulties and mass lay-offs (widely remembered in Chinese history as xiagang: "下岗") during the market reforms. Hualin and the steel plant are inspired by the real-life city Anshan (鞍山) and the state-owned enterprise Angang (鞍钢).

The story spans nearly 20 years and employs a three-line narrative structure with interwoven timelines from 1997, 1998, and 2016, using both flashbacks and inserts. The series consists of 12 episodes divided into four chapters. The titles of the first three chapters appear sequentially in the first episode, while the title of the fourth chapter appears only in the final episode. The third chapter extends for nearly 11 episodes, corresponding with the series title and illustrating how the protagonist, Wang Xiang, emerges from the autumn that trapped him.

== Cast and characters ==
Character	Cast	Description
Wang Xiang	Fan Wei	Wang Xiang, once a respected model worker at Huagang Factory, now works as a taxi driver after being laid off. He lives a modest life with his adopted son, Wang Bei. While investigating rogue taxis with fake car plates with his brother-in-law, Gong Biao, Wang Xiang unexpectedly discovers a person closely linked to a murder case from years ago, embarking on a pursuit that spans 18 years.
Gong Biao	Qin Hao	Wang Xiang's wife's cousin-in-law. A rare university graduate in the 1990s assigned to work in the factory office. Once a favored and promising figure, years later he became a down-and-out taxi driver, struggling with obesity due to diabetes.
Ma Desheng	Chen Minghao	A retired detective who was the captain of the criminal investigation team during the dismemberment case. He tirelessly pursued the truth of the case but was disciplined after assaulting Shen Dongliang upon discovering that he had sexually assaulted Shen Mo. Dissatisfied with the police department's handling of the matter, he voluntarily resigned. After retirement, he became a dance king at a senior university. At Wang Xiang's request, he helped investigate the rogue taxi case.
Shen Mo	Li Gengxi	Female college student with a friendly and cheerful personality. Her parents died when she was young. She was adopted by Shen Dongliang.
Shen Mo	Zhang Jingchu	Female college student with a friendly and cheerful personality. Her parents died when she was young. She was adopted by Shen Dongliang.
Wang Yang	Liu Yitie	Wang Xiang's son, Wang Yang, failed the college entrance exam but did not want to repeat his studies. He unexpectedly met Shen Mo, a female college student, at Hualin Medical College and started working as a waiter at the club to pursue her.
Fu Weijun	Jiang Qiming	Shen Mo's younger brother who was deaf and mute. After being refused adoption by Shen Dongliang, he was taken in by a family with the surname Fu. As an adult, he opened a video rental store in Hualin.
Sui Dong	Wang Xiaoyu	Shen Mo and Fu Weijun's friend. After growing up, he and Fu Weijun opened a video rental store in Hualin. He was later injured and hospitalized after being attacked due to old grudges.
Li Qiaoyun	Liu Lin	A female worker at Huagang who worked in the factory's weighing room. With a son suffering from leukemia, a disabled husband, and four elderly parents to care for,, she had no choice but to work as a hostess in a dance hall after being laid off. Following the deaths of her son and husband, she opened a massage parlor and developed feelings for Wang Xiang.
Wang Bei	Shi Pengyuan	Wang Xiang's adopted son
Shen Dongliang	Hou Yansong	Shen Mo's uncle and adoptive father.
Lu Wenzhong	Peng Ziheng	A native of Zhanjiang, Guangdong who posed as a Hong Kong businessman. He conspired with factory director Song Yukun to commit economic crimes.
Yin Hong	Wang Yidi	A hostess.
Luo Meisu	Lin Xiaojie	Wang Xiang's wife and Wang Yang's mother, she was frail and often ill.
Huang Liru	Wang Jiajia	A nurse at Huagang Factory Hospital who had an affair with factory director Song Yukun, resulting in pregnancy. After a miscarriage during a factory meeting, she was left infertile. She married Gong Biao and opened a home-based beauty salon.
Xing Jianchun	Yang Yiwei	The head of the Security Department at Huagang Factory, he was dismissed for selling factory equipment. Later, he developed uremia and survived by selling license plates.
Li Qun	Tang Zeng	A former subordinate of Ma Desheng when he was the captain of the criminal investigation team, he later parted ways with Ma Desheng due to differences in how they approached the case. By 2016, he was the head of the Hualin City Public Security Bureau.
Song Yukun	Zhang Fan	The former factory director of Huagang. He colluded with the fake Hong Kong businessman and was investigated by the disciplinary committee after being reported.
Miss Xu	Ren Suxi	The owner of a cold noodle shop near Huagang.
Miss Xu	Wang Yuyue	The owner of a cold noodle shop near Huagang.

== Release ==
The Long Season premiered on Tencent Video on 22 April 2023. It aired on Jiangsu Satellite TV in February 2024.

== Reception ==
The Long Season received positive critical reviews in both the Chinese domestic market and in secondary market overseas. After the miniseries premiered, it received a score of 9 on Chinese entertainment media database and social media site Douban. Following the finale, interest in the show increased, and the score briefly surged to 9.5 before stabilizing at 9.4, making it one of the highest-rated Chinese series of all time on the site. Beyond its quality in script, acting, and production values, the show's portrayal of the lives of ordinary people in Northeast China's rust belt during the 1990s xiagang (下岗: industrial layoffs) crisis due to institutional reforms of state-owned enterprises was a significant factor in its high ratings. The series' heavy socio-political metaphors have distinguished itself from other Chinese suspence dramas.

=== Awards ===
Award	Category	Nominee	Results	Ref.
18th Seoul International Drama Awards	International Competition: Best Actor	Fan Wei	Won	
18th Seoul International Drama Awards	Best Mini-series	The Long Season	Won	
29th Shanghai Television Festival	Best Director	Xin Shuang	Won	
