= Wong Chun =

Hong Kong filmmaker

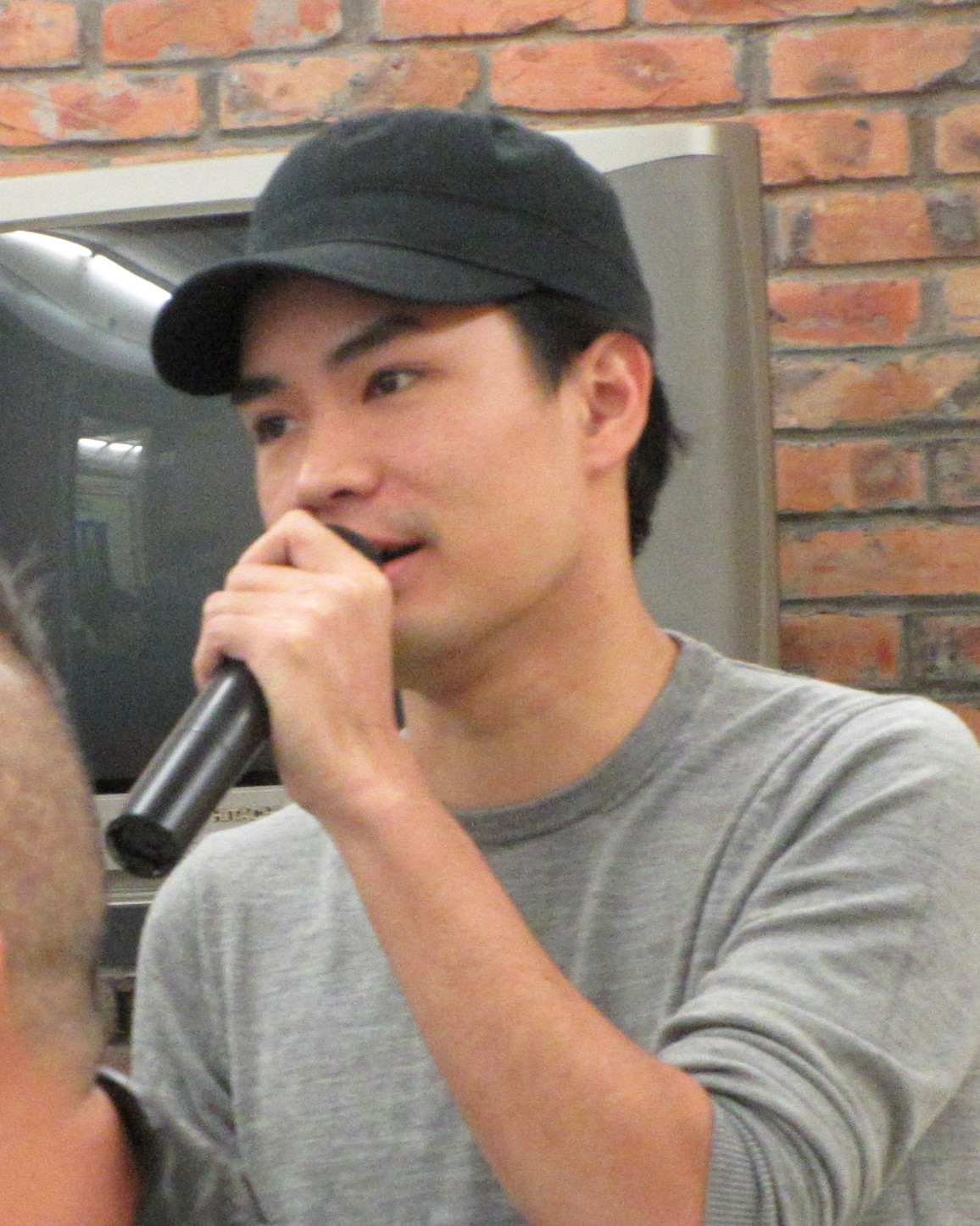
- Wong in 2017
- Born: (37–38)
- Education: City University of Hong Kong
- Notable work: Mad World (2016)

Wong Chun (Chinese: 黃進) is a Hong Kong director and screenwriter. His feature film debut Mad World (2016) was nominated for eights awards at the 36th Hong Kong Film Awards. For the film, Wong won Best New Director at the 53rd Golden Horse Awards and 36th Hong Kong Film Awards.

== Early life ==
Wong studied at City University of Hong Kong. He was inspired to pursue cinema after taking a class by director Patrick Tam. He graduated from the university's School of Creative Media in 2011 with a major in film.

== Career ==
After graduation, he entered his short film "6th March" into the 2011 Fresh Wave Short Film Competition, where he won the "Best Script" award. The film was subsequently nominated for Best Short Film award at the 49th Golden Horse Awards in 2012.

Wong and his feature film debut Mad World (2016) was one of two winners in the Higher Education Institution Group at the inaugural First Feature Film Initiative in 2013. The other winner was Steve Chan Chi-fat's Weeds on Fire (2016). Winners were given HK$2,000,000 for the budget. but weren't allowed to obtain outside funding. Wong credits CreateHK, who organized the First Feature Film Initiative, for lining up distributors for the film. Mad World, written by Florence Chan, is about a bipolar stockbroker (Shawn Yue) who is placed in the care of his father (Eric Tsang). Wong voiced the younger brother of Shawn Yue's character. The film was nominated for numerous awards, including Best New Director wins for Wong at the 53rd Golden Horse Awards and 36th Hong Kong Film Awards.

== Filmography ==
| Year | Title | Original title | Director | Writer | Notes/Ref. |
|---|---|---|---|---|---|
| 2011 | 6th March | 三月六日 | Yes | Yes | co-writer with Florence Chan; short film |
| 2013 | Good Take | | Yes | Yes | co-writer with Florence Chan; part of Streets of Macao short film anthology |
| 2016 | Mad World | 念無明 | Yes | No | |

== Awards and nominations ==
| Year | Award | Category | Work | Result | Ref. |
|---|---|---|---|---|---|
| 2016 | 53rd Golden Horse Awards | Best New Director | Mad World | Won | |
| 2016 | Hong Kong Film Directors Guild Awards | Best New Director | Mad World | Won | |
| 2016 | 23rd Hong Kong Film Critics Society Award | Best Director | Mad World | Won | |
| 2017 | 36th Hong Kong Film Awards | Best Director | Mad World | Nominated | |
| 2017 | 36th Hong Kong Film Awards | Best New Director | Mad World | Won | |
| 2017 | 17th Chinese Film Media Awards | Best New Director | Mad World | Nominated | |

== See also ==
- Heiward Mak—Hong Kong director and fellow City University alumni who got her start in the industry working with Eric Tsang
