= Crazy Stone (film) =

2006 Chinese black comedy film

- Crazy Stone film poster
- Directed by: Ning Hao
- Written by: Ning Hao; Zhang Cheng; Yue Xiaojun
- Produced by: Bao Shihong
- Starring: Guo Tao; Liu Hua; Teddy Lin; Liu Gang; Huang Bo; Xu Zheng
- Cinematography: Du Jie
- Edited by: Du Yuan
- Music by: Funky Sueyoshi
- Release date: 30 June 2006
- Running time: 98 minutes
- Languages: Standard Mandarin; Sichuanese
- Budget: $400,000
- Box office: over $1,500,000

Crazy Stone (simplified Chinese: 疯狂的石头; traditional Chinese: 瘋狂的石頭; pinyin: Fēngkúang de shítou) is a 2006 Chinese black comedy film directed by Ning Hao and produced by Andy Lau. It was immensely popular, earning 6 million RMB in its first week and more than 23 million RMB (US$3 million) in total box office in mainland China, despite its low budget (3 million HKD/US$400,000) and cast of unknowns. The movie was shot digitally on HD cameras and produced as part of Andy Lau's "FOCUS: First Cuts" series.

== Plot ==
When a precious jade stone is discovered in an old outhouse, the owner of said outhouse and the surrounding buildings suddenly finds himself with the financial clout to withstand the buy-out pressure of an unethical developer who wishes to build a large building on his plot. The owner, intending to display the stone to the public, puts his dedicated chief of security in charge of keeping it safe. But with the stakes running high, this is easier said than done. The developer hires a high-tech cat burglar from Hong Kong to steal the stone, the owner's wayward son sees the jewel as the perfect symbol of wealth and hatches a plan to use it to increase his chances at getting laid, and a gang of three con-men who hear about the jewel see it as their ticket to the big time. These three groups find themselves in direct competition and, finding their attempts foiled as often by the security guard as by each other, become more and more desperate as the film progresses.

== Style ==
Crazy Stone is uncommon in that the entire movie is spoken in a mishmash of varieties of Chinese, with Chongqing and Henan dialects, as well as various Hong Kongese (Cantonese) idioms used to great comedic effect. As is relatively common in Chinese humor, many jokes are puns or other plays on the language: for example, after one of the main characters crashes into a BMW, the angry owner shouts that his car is a "Bié Mō Wǒ" (别摸我, which means "Don't touch me"), a deliberate play on the actual initialism.

The film also pays homage to or is influenced by a number of films, both foreign and domestic. The scene in which a black suited thief tries to steal the coveted jade stone by descending from the ceiling attached to a rope is a reference to the American television series Mission: Impossible, for example. Similarly, one of the final scenes, which features a fight in an elevator, is a reference to the ending of the famous Hong Kong movie Infernal Affairs.
