= Zhang Dalei =

- 张大磊
- Born: 1985 (age 40–41); Inner Mongolia, China
- Education: Saint Petersburg State Institute of Film and Television
- Occupations: Actor, Film director, Screenwriter
- Years active: 2011–present
- Notable work: The Summer Is Gone
- Awards: Best Feature Film, 53rd Golden Horse Awards

Zhang Dalei (Chinese: 张大磊) is a Chinese film director and screenwriter, best known for his debut feature film The Summer Is Gone (2016), which won the Best Feature Film award at the 53rd Golden Horse Awards.

== Early life and education ==
Zhang was born in Inner Mongolia, China. He studied film directing at the Saint Petersburg State Institute of Film and Television in Russia.
