= Monica Mok =

Chinese-born Australian model and film actress

- Born: Wang Mengmeng; September 6, 1981 (age 45); Beijing, China
- Education: Macquarie University
- Occupation: Actress
- Years active: 2004–present
- Agent: Filmko Film (2007–2017)

Chinese name
- Chinese: 王萌萌
Transcriptions
Standard Mandarin
- Hanyu Pinyin: Wáng Méngméng

Mo Xiaoqi
- Chinese: 莫小奇
Transcriptions
Standard Mandarin
- Hanyu Pinyin: Mò Xiǎoqí

Mo Xiaoqi
- Chinese: 莫小棋
Transcriptions
Standard Mandarin
- Hanyu Pinyin: Mò Xiǎoqí

Mo Lin
- Chinese: 莫麒
Transcriptions
Standard Mandarin
- Hanyu Pinyin: Mò Lín

Monica Mok (Chinese: 莫小棋; pinyin: Mò Xiǎoqí) is a Chinese-born Australian model and film actress. She was nominated for the Best New Performer award at the 28th Hong Kong Film Awards for her role in the film Ocean Flame.

== Partial filmography ==
=== Film ===
Year	English title	Chinese title	Role	Notes
2004	Koma	救命	The Hypnotist	
2007	Invisible Target	红美丽	Monica	
2008	Ocean Flame	一半海水，一半火焰	Li Chuan	
2009	Accident	意外	Wife of Ho Kwok-fai, the Brain	
2009	To Live and Die in Mongkok	旺角监狱	Pamela	
2010	Apart Together	团圆	Na Na	
2010	Don Quixote	魔侠传之唐吉可德	Peasant woman	
2010	Color Me Love	爱出色	Ke Min	
2010		危意外情直播	Xin Xin	
2011	Under the Influence	戒烟不戒酒	Staff member	
2011	Mr. & Mrs. Single	隐婚男女	Amanda	
2011	Mural	画壁	Ding Xiang	
2012	Crazy Dinner Party	饭局也疯狂	Monica	
2012	Harpoon	惊魂游戏	Mei Qi	
2012	Happiness Me Too	幸福迷途	Mei Sinuo	
2012	The Next Magic	下一个奇迹	May	
2012	Blood Stained Shoes	绣花鞋	Xu Shi	
2012	Diaries of the Cheating Hearts	擒爱记	Jia Lan	
2012	The Last Tycoon	大上海	Ah Bao	
2014	The House That Never Dies	京城81号	Liu Li	
2015	Let's Get Married	咱们结婚吧	Wang Ke'er	
2015	Blind Spot	探灵档案	Jin Lili	
2016	The Insanity	你好，疯子！	Li Li	
2018	Live Broadcast	现场直播		Internet movie
2019	Triple Threat	三重威胁之跨国大营救	Su Feng	

=== Television ===
Year	English title	Chinese title	Role	Notes
2003		出水芙蓉	Tan Tan	
2004	Through Passion	穿越激情	Charles young	
2005	The Gate of the Sea	海之门	Tai Tai	
2006	Sad Mother and Son	悲情母子	Li Minna	
2007	The Legend of the Banner Hero	大旗英雄传	Leng Qingshuang	
2007	We Have Nowhere To Place Youth	我们无处安放的青春	Liu Yi	
2007	Struggle	挣扎	Ru Fei	
2007	Tough Love	艰难爱情	Tan Xi	
2007	The Golden Triangle	金三角夺宝	Lola	
2008		盗墓鬼吹灯	Qin Liangyu	
2011	International Rescue	国际大营救	Dano	
2011	Unbeatable 2	无懈可击之高手如林		
2011	Mantis	螳螂	Dai Wei	
2011	Goddess of Mercy	新玉观音	Zhong Ning	
2011	Beijing Love Story	北京爱情故事	Wu Mei	
2012	Athena	雅典娜女神	Yu Xia	
2012	The Old Ferry	老渡口	Yu Qian	
2013	Longmen Express	龙门镖局	The Empress Dowager	
2014	Three Unusual Detectives	长安三怪探	Bi Lian	
2014	Second Pregnancy	二胎	Ye Qing	
2014	The Lady in Cubicle	格子间女人	Mini	
2015	The Merchants of Qing Dynasty	大清盐商	Yao Mengmeng/ Ying Zi	
2015	Master of Destiny	风云天地	Kimberly	
2015		映山红	Cai Fu	
2017	With Elites	我不是精英	Liao Mei	
2014	Woman In Love	海上嫁女记	Fan Jiaoyan	
2014		防水逆联盟	Xue Fei	
2014	Beautiful Trainee	美丽见习生	Lin Da	
2014	Pudong	大浦东	Zheng Xinman	
2019	Spy Hunter	天衣无缝	Su Mei	
2021	The Legend of Xiao Chuo	燕云台	Yilelan	

== Awards and nominations ==
=== Film and television ===
Year	Nominated work	Award	Category	Result	Ref.
2008	Ocean Flame	45th Golden Horse Awards	Best Leading Actress	Nominated	
2008	Ocean Flame	28th Hong Kong Film Awards	Best New Performer	Nominated	
