= Don Quixote (2010 film) =

2010 Chinese-Hong Kong film by Ah Gan

- Directed by: Ah Gan
- Written by: Ah Gan; Yu Baimei; Jackie Poon
- Produced by: Ah Gan; Dominic Yip
- Starring: Guo Tao; Wang Gang; Karena Lam
- Cinematography: Parkie Chan
- Edited by: T.K. Tang
- Music by: Zhao Zhao
- Production companies: Filmko Pictures Beijing; Shenzhen Golden Shores Films
- Release dates: October 15, 2010 (China); October 28, 2010 (Hong Kong)
- Running time: 106 minutes
- Countries: China; Hong Kong
- Language: Mandarin

Don Quixote (Chinese: 魔俠傳之唐吉可德; pinyin: Móxiáchuán zhī Tángjíkědé) is a 2010 fantasy film directed by Ah Gan based on Miguel de Cervantes' 17th-century novel. A Chinese-Hong Kong co-production, it was promoted as China's first fully 3D film.

== Cast ==
- Guo Tao as Tang Fanghai (Don Quixote)
- Wang Gang as Sang Qiu (Sancho Panza)
- Karena Lam as Sang Cuihua (Dulcinea)
- Miao Pu as Jin Xiang Tong
- Liu Hua as Linghu
- Paul Chun as Dongfang
- Hai Yi Tian as Ximen
- Ying Zhuang as Sima Wan, the Taoist

== Production ==
Director Ah Gan stated that nearly 60 percent of the film is made up of special effects. To create these special effect shots, he tried several special effects companies before taking his film to England, where he used the equipment and technology from the hit film Ice Age. The film was promoted as China's first wholly 3D movie as only the action sequences in Yuen Woo-ping's True Legend (2010) were shot in 3D.

== Release ==
Don Quixote was released on October 15, 2010 in China. In its opening week, the film grossed a total of $1,809,682 and was the third highest film in the Chinese box office. The film grossed a total of $5,115,844 in China. The film was released on October 28 in Hong Kong where it grossed a total of $16,246.

== Reception ==
Derek Elley of Film Business Asia gave the film a five out of ten rating, calling it a stating that "after about half-an-hour — around the time the film leaves behind the novel and embarks on its own invented story — it becomes clear that it isn't developing any dramatic momentum of its own."
