= Incense (film) =

- Film poster
- Chinese: 香火
- Hanyu Pinyin: Xiāng Huǒ
- Directed by: Ning Hao
- Written by: Ning Hao
- Produced by: Zhang Yu; Liu Qingmiao
- Starring: Li Qiang
- Cinematography: Ning Hao
- Edited by: Liu Xin; Lao Wu
- Production company: Beijing Frontline Production
- Release date: 2003
- Running time: 98 minutes
- Country: China
- Language: Jin Chinese
- Budget: ¥9000

Incense is a 2003 Chinese indie/underground film written and directed by Ning Hao, then a Beijing Film Academy film major, on a ¥9000 budget. The film tells a somewhat humorous and tragic story about a Buddhist monk in a remote Shanxi village trying to repair the statue in his dilapidated temple. After encountering bureaucratic government employees, crooked policemen, and thugs who lie to him or rob him, he finally decides to bamboozle superstitious believers to raise the money.

The film was never released in Chinese theaters but rather shown at international film festivals and a few "art houses" in the west.
