= Guo Tao (actor) =

Chinese actor

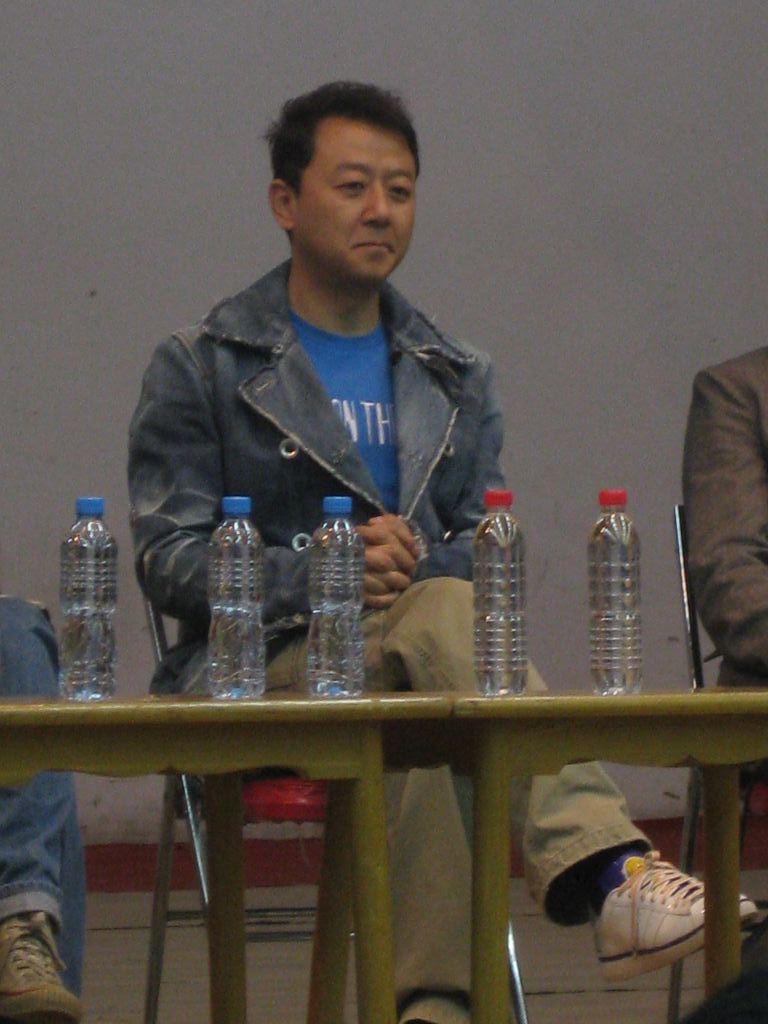
- Guo in 2009
- Born: December 17, 1969 (age 56); Xi'an, Shaanxi, China
- Occupation: Actor
- Years active: 1991–present
- Spouse: Li Ran - Raina Lee (李燃) (m. 2006)
- Children: 2 (Patrick Guo in 2007 and Isabella in 2011)

Guo Tao (Chinese: 郭涛; pinyin: Guō Tāo; born December 17, 1969) is a Chinese actor.

Guo was born in Xi'an. He graduated from Central Academy of Drama in 1992. He appeared as main cast of Chinese version TV show Where Are We Going, Dad? and its film Where Are We Going, Dad? with his son.

== Filmography ==
- 1991 Three brothers
- 1993 Fang Shiyu
- 1994 To Live
- 1997 Spicy Love Soup
- 1998 So Close to Paradise
- 2002 No Lonely Angels
- 2004 Green Hat
- 2006 Crazy Stone
- 2006 2 Become 1
- 2007 Phoenix
- 2007 Getting Home
- 2007 Kidnap
- 2007 Two Stupid Eggs
- 2008 Marriage Trap
- 2008 Desires of the Heart (桃花运)
- 2008 Out of Control
- 2009 Gao Xing (高兴)
- 2009 All's Well, Ends Well 2009
- 2009 Weaving Girl
- 2009 Chengdu, I Love You
- 2010 Once Upon a Chinese Classic
- 2010 Don Quixote
- 2011 Deadly Will
- 2011 The Law of Attraction
- 2012 Guns and Roses
- 2012 White Deer Plain
- 2012 Croczilla
- 2013 Drug War
- 2013 7 Assassins
- 2013 Blind Detective
- 2013 Flash Play
- 2014 Where Are We Going, Dad?
- 2014 Coming Home.
- 2014 When a Peking Family Meets Aupair
- 2014 Breakup Buddies
- 2015 Emperor's Holidays
- 2015 The Dead End
- 2016 Mr. Nian
- 2019 Desire Game

== Television dramas ==
- Zhanguo (戰國) (1997) -- as Qin Shi Huang
- Love Like the Galaxy (星汉灿烂) (2022) -- as Cheng Shi
