= Tokyo Filmex =

International film festival in Tokyo

- Location: Tokyo, Japan
- Founded: 2000
- Language: International
- Website: http://filmex.jp/

Tokyo Filmex (東京フィルメックス; stylized as "TOKYO FILMeX") is an international film festival established in 2000.

== History ==
The film festival was launched by Office Kitano, the agency and production company co-founded by leading actor-filmmaker Takeshi Kitano. Tokyo Filmex especially focuses on new and independent feature films from Asia. A large number of films selected for competition program come from China, Japan, Korea, Iran, and other Asian countries.

The festival's main events have been held annually at Yurakucho, Tokyo in late November. These events consist of the Competition Program, Special screening Program and Filmmakers in focus Program. Alongside the competition program for young emerging Asian filmmakers and other screening programs, stage appearances by actors and symposiums are also planned to discover the masterworks of independent filmmakers from around the world.

In 2018, Office Kitano was restructured after Kitano announced in March that he was quitting to go independent. As representing Kitano brought in a large proportion of Office Kitano's revenue, the company has now scaled back production and is no longer in a position to fund Tokyo Filmex. Kinoshita Group has stepped in to take over the management role and part-finance the event, which also receives funding from government and sponsorship deals.

== 27th edition (2026) ==
The 27th Tokyo Filmex is scheduled for November 20-29, 2026, at Yurakucho, Tokyo, with ten titles in competition, among them Thailand's Oscar submission 9 Temples to Heaven and Nepal's Elephants in the Fog. Taiwanese actor Lee Kang-sheng sits on the three-member international jury. Chinese director Michelle Zhou's debut Big Little Things, set in Harbin, competes after screening in the Horizons section of the Venice Film Festival and receiving four Golden Horse Awards nominations. Special screenings include the M+ 4K restoration of Ann Hui's 1981 The Story of Woo Viet and a short film by Jia Zhangke.

== Winners ==
=== Competition Grand Prize ===
| Year | Film | Director | Nationality of Director (at time of film's release) |
|---|---|---|---|
| 2000 | Suzhou River | Lou Ye | China |
| 2001 | Flower Island | Song Il-gon | Korea |
| 2002 | Blissfully Yours | Apichatpong Weerasethakul | Thailand |
| 2003 | Incense | Ning Hao | China |
| 2004 | Tropical Malady | Apichatpong Weerasethakul | Thailand |
| 2005 | Bashing | Masahiro Kobayashi | Japan |
| 2006 | To Get to Heaven, First You Have to Die | Jamshed Usmonov | Tajikistan |
| 2007 | Tehilim | Raphaël Nadjari | Israel |
| 2008 | Waltz with Bashir | Ari Folman | Israel |
| 2009 | Breathless | Yang Ik-june | Korea |
| 2010 | Love Addiction | Shinki Uchida | Japan |
| 2011 | Old Dog | Pema Tseden | China |
| 2012 | Epilogue | Amir Manor | Israel |
| 2013 | In Bloom | Nana Ekvtimishvili and Simon Groß | Georgia |
| 2014 | Cyclo D' Or | Francis Pasion | Philippines |
| 2015 | Tharlo | Pema Tseden | China |
| 2016 | Life after life | Zhang Hanyi | China |
| 2017 | Marlina the Murderer in Four Acts | Mouly Surya | Indonesia |
| 2017 | The Seen and Unseen | Kamila Andini | Indonesia |
| 2018 | Ayka | Sergei Dvortsevoy | Russia |
| 2019 | Ballon | Pema Tseden | China |
| 2020 | In Between Dying | Hilal Baydarov | Azerbaijan |
| 2021 | What Do We See When We Look at the Sky? | Alexandre Koberidze | Georgia |
| 2021 | Anatomy of Time | Jakrawal Nilthamrong | Thailand |
| 2022 | Autobiography | Makbul Mubarak | Indonesia |
| 2023 | Inside the Yellow Cocoon Shell | Phạm Thiên Ân | Vietnam |
