= Golden Goblet Jury Grand Prix =

Chinese film award

The Golden Goblet Jury Grand Prix (Chinese: 金爵奖评委会大奖) is a special jury prize awarded to films in the main category of competition at the Shanghai International Film Festival.

== Award winners ==
Year	Film	Country
1993	Cageman	(Hong Kong) Jacob Cheung
1995	House Of Fire	(Argentina) Juan Bautista Stagnaro
1995	American Daughter	(Russia) Karen Shakhnazarov
1997	Live at Peace	(China) Hu Bingliu
1997	Mendel	(Norway) Alexander Røsler
1999	The Lunatics' Ball	(New Zealand) Michael Thorp
2001	no award this year	
2002	All About Lily Chou-Chou	(Japan) Shunji Iwai
2003	no award this year	
2004	Jasmine Women	(China) Hou Yong
2005	Gimme Kudos	(China) Huang Jianxin
2006	The Forest Gang	(China) Qi Jian
2007	The New Man	(Sweden) Klaus Haro
2008	Old Fish	(China) Gao Qunshu
2009	The Search	(China) Pema Tseden
2010	Deep in the Clouds	(China) Liu Jie
2011	Mr. Tree	(China) Han Jie
2012	For the Love of God	(Canada) Micheline Lanctôt
2013	Reliance	(Sweden) William Olsson
2014	Uncle Victory	(China) Zhang Meng
2015	Carte Blanche	(Poland) Jacek Lusinski
2016	See You in Texas	(Italy) Vito Palmieri
2017	Yellow	(Iran) Mostafa Taghizad’h
2018	Ala Changso	(China) Sonthar Gyal
2019	Inhale-Exhale	(Georgia (country)) Dito Tsintsadze
2020		
2021	Barbarian Invasion	(Malaysia) Tan Chui Mui
2023	Muyeres	(Spain) Marta Lallana
2024	Adult	(Argentina) Mariano Gonzalez
