= 23rd Beijing College Student Film Festival =

2016 film festival in Beijing, China

The 23rd annual Beijing College Student Film Festival (simplified Chinese: 第二十三届北京大学生电影节; traditional Chinese: 第二十三屆北京大學生電影節) took place in Beijing, China between April 9 and May 10. Miss Partners was selected as the festival's opening night film.

== Winners and nominees ==
Best Film: The Master – Xu Haofeng; A Fool – Chen Jianbin; Tharlo – Pema Tseden; Goodbye'' – Degena; Mr. Six – Guan Hu	Best Director: Jia Zhangke – Mountains May Depart; Chen Sicheng – Detective Chinatown; Pema Tseden – Tharlo; Guan Hu – Mr. Six; Cao Baoping – The Dead End
Best Screenplay: Detective Chinatown – Chen Sicheng; Young Love Lost – Chen Jianzhong, Lu Nei; The Master – Xu Haofeng; A Fool – Chen Jianbin; Mojin: The Lost Legend – Zhang Jialu	Jury Award: A Fool
Best Actor: Feng Xiaogang – Mr. Six; Wang Qianyuan – Saving Mr. Wu; Duan Yihong – The Dead End; Chen Jianbin – A Fool; Liao Fan – The Master	Best Actress: Bai Baihe – Go Away Mr. Tumor; Xu Qing – Mr. Six; Jiang Qinqin – A Fool; Li Meng – Young Love Lost; Song Jia – The Master
Best Newcomer: River, Gtsngbo, Fluss – Yangjin Lamu; Tharlo – Xidenima; Out in the Silence – Lang Yueting	Best Directorial Debut: Young Love Lost – Xiang Guoqiang; A Fool – Chen Jianbin; Goodbye – Degena; Jian Bing Man – Da Peng; Goodbye Mr. Loser – Yan Fei, Peng Damo
Best Visual Effects: Mojin: The Lost Legend; The Master; Monster Hunt; Detective Chinatown; The Love in 1980s	Artistic Exploration Award: Tharlo – Pema Tseden; River, Gtsngbo, Fluss – Sonthar Gyal; The Master – Xu Haofeng
Students' Choice Award for Favorite Director: Alec Su	Students' Choice Award for Favorite Actor: Li Chen
Students' Choice Award for Favorite Actress: Miriam Yeung	Organizing Committee Award: Mr. Six
