= 2002 Cannes Film Festival =

- Official poster of the 55th Cannes Film Festival.
- Opening film: Hollywood Ending
- Closing film: And Now... Ladies and Gentlemen
- Location: Cannes, France
- Founded: 1946
- Awards: Palme d'Or: The Pianist
- Hosted by: Virginie Ledoyen
- No. of films: 22 (Main Competition)
- Festival date: 15 May 2002 – 26 May 2002
- Website: festival-cannes.com/en

Cannes Film Festival
- 2003 2001

The 55th Cannes Film Festival took place from 15 to 26 May 2002. American filmmaker David Lynch served as jury president for the main competition. Virginie Ledoyen hosted the opening and closing ceremonies.

French-Polish filmmaker Roman Polanski won the Palme d'Or, the festival's top prize, for the drama film The Pianist. American filmmaker Woody Allen was awarded with the inaugural Honorary Palme d'Or, given to a director who had achieved a notable body of work but who had never won the regular Palme d'Or.

The festival opened with Hollywood Ending by Woody Allen, and closed with Claude Lelouch's And Now... Ladies and Gentlemen.

2002 Un Certain Regard poster.

== Juries ==
=== Main Competition ===
- David Lynch, American filmmaker - Jury President
- Bille August, Danish filmmaker
- Christine Hakim, Indonesian actress
- Claude Miller, French filmmaker
- Raúl Ruiz, Chilean filmmaker
- Walter Salles, Brazilian filmmaker
- Sharon Stone, American actress
- Régis Wargnier, French filmmaker
- Michelle Yeoh, Malaysian actress

=== Un Certain Regard ===
- Anne Fontaine, Luxembourger filmmaker - Jury President
- Fabienne Bradfer, film critic
- Jean-Sébastien Chauvin, film critic
- Louis Guichard, film critic
- Fabrice Pliskin, film critic
- David Tran, film critic
- Pierre Vavasseur, critic

=== Cinéfondation and Short Film Competition ===
- Martin Scorsese, American filmmaker - Jury President
- Judith Godrèche, French actress
- Abbas Kiarostami, Iranian filmmaker
- Jan Schütte, German filmmaker
- Tilda Swinton, British actress

=== Camera d'Or ===
- Geraldine Chaplin, International actress - Jury President
- Bahman Ghobadi, Iranian filmmaker
- Romain Goupil, French filmmaker
- Marthe Keller, Swiss actress
- Murali Nair, Indian director

== Official Selection ==
=== In Competition ===
The following feature films competed for the Palme d'Or:

English title	Original title	Director(s)	Production country
24 Hour Party People		Michael Winterbottom	United Kingdom
About Schmidt		Alexander Payne	United States
The Adversary	L'Adversaire	Nicole Garcia	France
All or Nothing		Mike Leigh	United Kingdom
Bowling for Columbine		Michael Moore	United States, Canada, Germany
Chi-hwa-seon	취화선	Im Kwon-taek	South Korea
Demonlover		Olivier Assayas	France
Divine Intervention	يد إلهية	Elia Suleiman	Palestine, France, Morocco, Germany
Irréversible		Gaspar Noé	France
Kedma		Amos Gitai	Israel
Marie-Jo and Her Two Lovers	Marie-Jo et ses deux amours	Robert Guédiguian	France
The Man Without a Past	Mies vailla menneisyyttä	Aki Kaurismäki	Finland
My Mother's Smile	L'ora di religione (Il sorriso di mia madre)	Marco Bellocchio	Italy
The Pianist		Roman Polanski	France, Germany, Poland, United Kingdom
Punch-Drunk Love		Paul Thomas Anderson	United States
Russian Ark	Русский ковчег	Alexander Sokurov	Russia, Germany, Canada, Finland
The Son	Le Fils	Jean-Pierre and Luc Dardenne	Belgium, France
Spider		David Cronenberg	Canada, United Kingdom
Sweet Sixteen		Ken Loach	United Kingdom, Germany, Spain
Ten	ده	Abbas Kiarostami	Iran
The Uncertainty Principle	O Princípio da Incerteza	Manoel de Oliveira	Portugal
Unknown Pleasures	任逍遥	Jia Zhangke	China

=== Un Certain Regard ===
The following films were selected for the competition of Un Certain Regard:

English title	Original title	Director(s)	Production country
Angel on the Right	Фариштаи китфи рост	Jamshed Usmonov	Tajikistan
Balzac and the Little Chinese Seamstress	巴尔扎克与小裁缝	Dai Sijie	China, France
Blissfully Yours	สุดเสน่หา	Apichatpong Weerasethakul	Thailand
The Box of Life	صندوق الدنيا	Ossama Mohammed	Syria, France
El bonaerense		Pablo Trapero	Argentina, France, Chile, Netherlands
Carnage	Carnages	Delphine Gleize	France
The Confession	İtiraf	Zeki Demirkubuz	Turkey
Cry Woman	哭泣的女人	Liu Bingjian	China
Double Vision	雙瞳	Chen Kuo-fu	Taiwan, Hong Kong
Fate	Yazgı	Zeki Demirkubuz	Turkey
Glowing Eyes	La chatte à deux têtes	Jacques Nolot	France
Madame Satã		Karim Aïnouz	Brazil, France
Marooned in Iraq	گم‌گشته‌ای در عراق	Bahman Ghobadi	Iran
A Piece of Sky	Une part du ciel	Bénédicte Liénard	France, Belgium
Rachida		Yamina Bachir	Algeria
Raising Victor Vargas		Peter Sollett	United States
Seventeen Times Cecile Cassard	17 fois Cécile Cassard	Christophe Honoré	France
Ten Minutes Older		Spike Lee, Aki Kaurismäki, Chen Kaige, Jim Jarmusch, Werner Herzog, Víctor Erice, Wim Wenders	China, Finland, France, Germany, Netherlands, Spain, United Kingdom, United States
Terra incognita		Ghassan Salhab	Lebanon, France
To Stay Alive	بمانی	Dariush Mehrjui	Iran
Tomorrow La Scala!		Francesca Joseph	United Kingdom
Waiting for Happiness	في انتظار السعادة	Abderrahmane Sissako	Mauritania, France

=== Out of Competition ===
The following films were selected to be screened out of competition:

English title	Original title	Director(s)	Production country
16 December		Mani Shankar	India
And Now... Ladies and Gentlemen (closing film)		Claude Lelouch	France, United Kingdom
Ararat		Atom Egoyan	Canada, France
Carlo Giuliani, Boy	Carlo Giuliani, ragazzo	Francesca Comencini	Italy
City of God	Cidade de Deus	Fernando Meirelles and Kátia Lund	Brazil, France, Germany, United States
Devdas		Sanjay Leela Bhansali	India
Femme Fatale		Brian De Palma	France, Germany, United States
From the Other Side	De l'autre côté	Chantal Akerman	Finland, France
Histoires de festival		Gilles Jacob	France
Hollywood Ending (opening film)		Woody Allen	United States
The Kid Stays in the Picture		Brett Morgen and Nanette Burstein	United States
The Last Letter	La dernière lettre	Frederick Wiseman	United States, France
Murder by Numbers		Barbet Schroeder	United States
Searching for Debra Winger		Rosanna Arquette	United States
Spirit: Stallion of the Cimarron		Kelly Asbury and Lorna Cook	United States
Star Wars: Episode II – Attack of the Clones		George Lucas	United States
To Be and to Have	Être et avoir	Nicolas Philibert	France
Women in the Mirror	鏡の女たち	Yoshishige Yoshida	Japan

=== Cinéfondation ===
The following short films were selected for the competition of Cinéfondation:

- 17 minute intarziere by Catalin Mitulescu (Romania)
- Chogyeoul Jumshim by Byung-Hwa Kang (South Korea)
- Honey Moon by Sung-Jin Park (South Korea)
- K-G I Nod Och Lust by Jens Jonsson (Sweden)
- Khoj by Tridib Poddar (India)
- La derniere journee d'Alfred Maassen by David Lammers (Netherlands)
- La mort en exil by Ayten Mutlu Saray (Switzerland)
- P.S. by Arni Asgeirsson (Poland)
- Um Sol Alaranjado by Eduardo Valente (Brazil)
- Questions d'un ouvrier mort by Aya Somech (Israel)
- Request by Jinoh Park (South Korea)
- Seule maman a les yeux bleus by Eric Forestier (France)
- Shearing by Eicke Bettinga (United Kingdom)
- Soshuu no neko by Masaaki Uchida (Japan)
- The Look Of Happiness by Marianela Maldonado (United Kingdom)
- Vals by Edgar Bartenev (Russia)

=== Short film competition ===
The following short films competed for the Short Film Palme d'Or:

- A Very Very Silent Film by Manish Jha
- After Rain (Esö után) by Péter Mészáros
- Daughter by Eduardo Rodríguez
- Le chaperon noir by Yannis Yapanis
- Retenir son souffle by Anthony Lucas
- Speel Met Me by Esther Rots
- Tai Tai by Nicholas Chin
- Tango de l'oubli by Alexis Mital Toledo
- The Stone of Folly by Jesse Rosensweet
- Vol 404 by Bruce Terris
- Yoake a Chewing-Gum Story by Roland Zumbühl

== Parallel sections ==
=== International Critics' Week ===
The following films were screened for the 41st International Critics' Week (41e Semaine de la Critique):

Feature film competition

- Respiro by Emanuele Crialese (Italy)
- Filles perdues, cheveux gras by Claude Duty (France)
- Rana’s Wedding by Hany Abu-Assad (Palestine)
- Too Young To Die (Jukeodo joha) by Park Jin-pyo (South Korea)
- Les Fils de Marie by Carole Laure (Canada - France)
- Kabala by Assane Kouyaté (Mali/France)
- Chicken Heart by Hiroshi Shimizu (Japan)

Short film competition

- Le Jour où je suis né by Kunitoshi Manda (Japan)
- Lettre au fils by Philippe Welsh (France)
- Malcom by Baker Karim (Sweden)
- Meeting Evil (Möte med ondskan) by Reza Parsa (Sweden)
- 2 Minutes (2 Minutter) by Jacob Tschernia (Denmark)
- Le Vigile by Frédéric Pelle (France)
- From Mesmer, with Love or Tea for Two (De Mesmer, con amor o Té para dos) by Salvador Lubezki & Alejandro Lubezki (Mexico)

Special screenings

- Intacto by Juan Carlos Fresnadillo (Spain) (opening film)
- More by Barbet Schroeder (Luxembourg) (La séance du Parrain)
- Bella Ciao by Roberto Torelli, Marco Giusti (Italy) (Documentary)
- Intimisto by Licia Eminenti (France) (Prix de la Critique)
- Anxiety by Christoffer Boe (Denmark) (Prix de la Critique)
- Da Zero a Dieci (From Zero to Ten) by Luciano Ligabue (Italy) (closing film)

=== Directors' Fortnight ===
The following films were screened for the 2002 Directors' Fortnight (Quinzaine des Réalizateurs):

- Abouna by Mahamat-Saleh Haroun (Chad, France)
- Angela by Roberta Torre (Italy)
- Apartment 5C by Raphaël Nadjari (France, Israel, United States)
- Blue Gate Crossing by Chih-yen Yee (Taiwan, France)
- Bord de mer by Julie Lopes-Curval (France)
- The Embalmer (L'imbalsamatore) by Matteo Garrone (Italy)
- Ingmar Bergman: Intermezzo (doc.) by Gunnar Bergdahl (Sweden)
- István Bibó, fragments by Péter Forgács (Hungary)
- Japón by Carlos Reygadas (Mexico, Spain, Germany)
- Laurel Canyon by Lisa Cholodenko (United States)
- Matir Moina (The Clay Bird) by Tareque Masud (France, Bangladesh)
- Monrak Transistor by Pen-ek Ratanaruang (Thailand)
- Morvern Callar by Lynne Ramsay (United Kingdom)
- Nada+ by Juan Carlos Cremata Malberti (Cuba, France, Spain, Italy)
- Occident by Cristian Mungiu (Romania)
- Once Upon a Time in the Midlands by Shane Meadows (United Kingdom, Germany)
- Only the Strong Survive (doc.) by D.A. Pennebaker, Chris Hegedus (United States)
- Un oso rojo by Israel Adrián Caetano (Argentina, France, Spain)
- Otello di Carmelo Bene by Carmelo Bene (Italy)
- Le pays du chien qui chante by Yann Dedet (France)
- Une pure coïncidence by Romain Goupil (France)
- Sex Is Comedy by Catherine Breillat (France)
- Two (Deux) by Werner Schroeter (France, Germany)
- Welcome to Collinwood by Joseph and Anthony Russo (United States)

Short films

- A-20 by Geoff Hughes, Brad Warren (United States)
- Après l’enfance by Thomas Lilti (France)
- Bang Nhau... Egaux by Stéfan Sao Nélet (France)
- Bob the slob by Nate Theis (United States)
- Bus 44 by Dayyan Eng (Hong Kong, United States)
- L’Arrivée by Peter Tscherkassky (Austria)
- Comme ça j’entends la mer by Hélène Milano (France)
- Comme un seul homme by Jean-Louis Gonnet (France)
- Deux cents dirham by Laila Marrakchi (France, Morocco)
- Entering indifference by Vincent Dieutre (France)
- Fish in the Sea is Not Thirsty by Soopum Sohn (South Korea, United States)
- Insomniac by Matt Woo], Vanja Varasac (United States)
- La Vie sur un fil by Steven Lippman (United States)
- Mémoires incertaines by Michale Boganim (France, United Kingdom)
- Mexicano by Toby McDonald (United Kingdom)
- Muno by Bouli Lanners (Belgium)
- Next Door by Jeff Rich (United States)
- Présent inachevé by Johan Van der Keuken (Netherlands)
- Phantom by Matthias Müller (Germany)
- Portraits filmés 2002 by Valérie Mréjen (France)
- Samson by Graham Dubose (United States)
- The Girl in the Red Dress by Aletta Collins (United Kingdom)

== 1939 Palme d'Or ==
The inaugural Cannes Film Festival was to have been held in 1939, but was cancelled by the outbreak of the Second World War. The organizers of the 2002 festival assembled a jury of six members, including Dieter Kosslick and Alberto Barbera, to watch seven of the twelve features which had been entered in the 1939 competition, namely: Goodbye, Mr. Chips, La piste du nord, Lenin in 1918, The Four Feathers, The Wizard of Oz, Union Pacific, and Boefje. Union Pacific was retrospectively voted the winner of the 1939 Palme d'Or.

== Official Awards ==
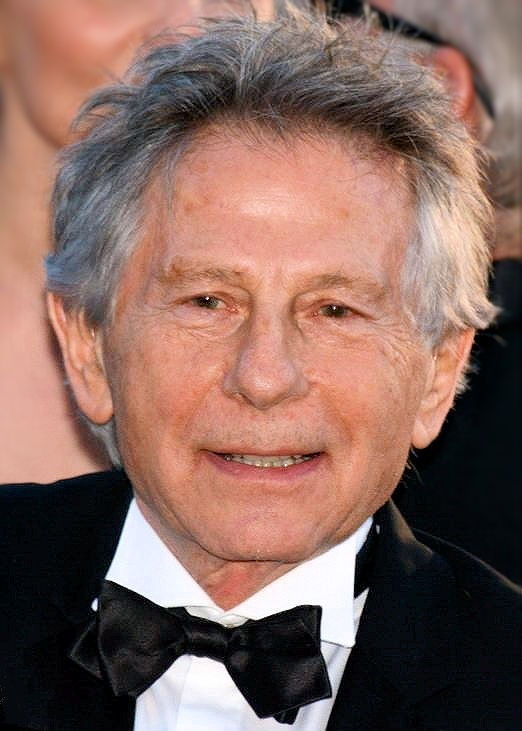
Roman Polanski, Palme d'Or winner

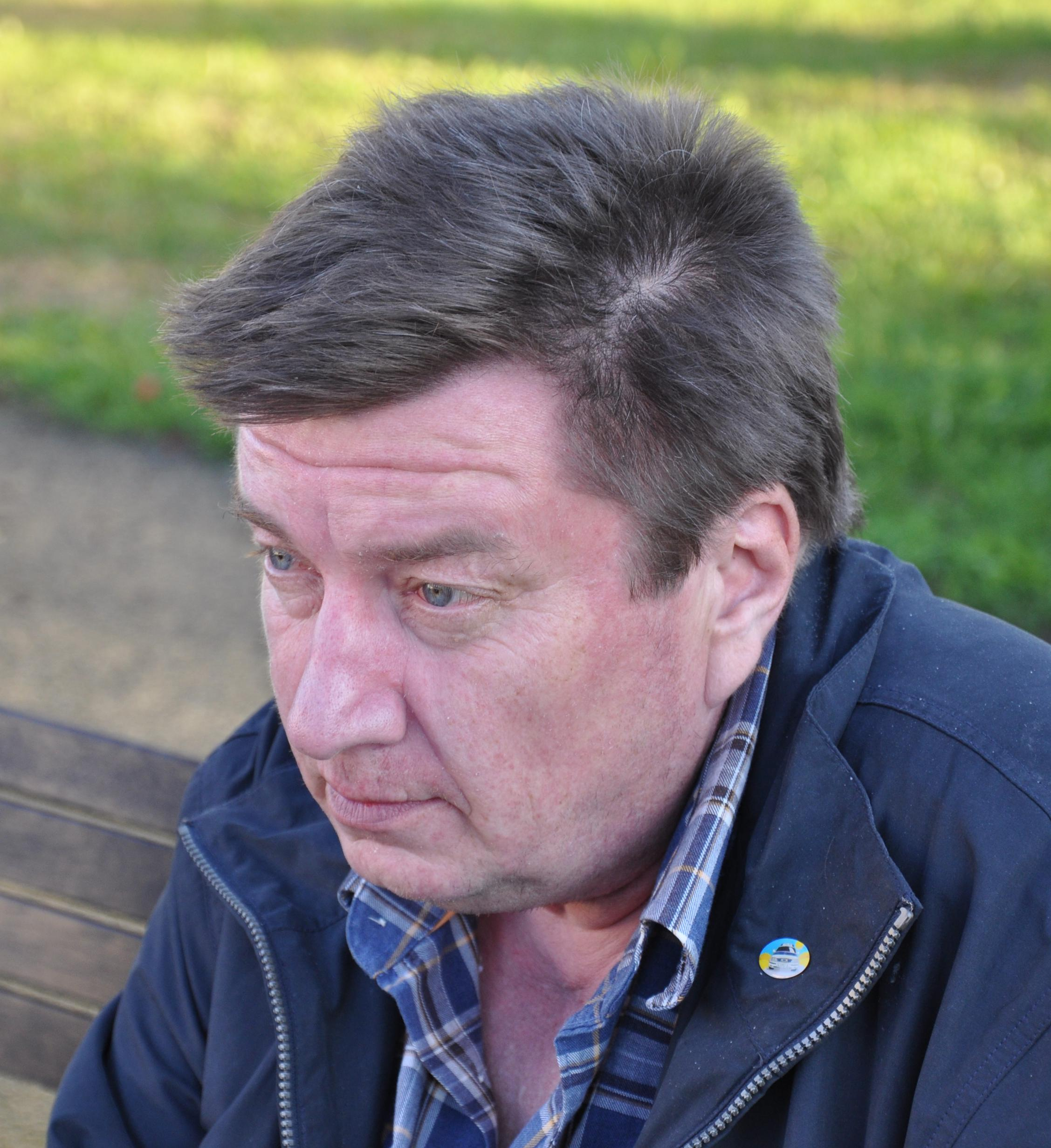
Aki Kaurismäki, Grand Prix winner

The following films and people received the 2002 Official selection awards:

=== Main Competition ===
- Palme d'Or: The Pianist by Roman Polanski
- Grand Prix: The Man Without a Past by Aki Kaurismäki
- Best Director:
  - Im Kwon-taek for Chi-hwa-seon
  - Paul Thomas Anderson for Punch-Drunk Love
- Best Screenplay: Sweet Sixteen by Paul Laverty
- Best Actress: Kati Outinen for The Man Without a Past
- Best Actor: Olivier Gourmet for The Son
- Jury Prize: Divine Intervention by Elia Suleiman
- 55th Anniversary Prize: Bowling for Columbine by Michael Moore

=== Honorary Palme d'Or ===
- Woody Allen

=== Un Certain Regard ===
- Blissfully Yours by Apichatpong Weerasethakul

=== Cinéfondation ===
- First Prize: Um Sol Alaranjado by Eduardo Valente
- Second Prize: Seule maman a les yeux bleus by Eric Forestier
- Third Prize: Questions d'un ouvrier mort by Aya Somech

=== Caméra d'Or ===
- Seaside by Julie Lopes-Curval
  - Special Mention: Japón by Carlos Reygadas

=== Short Films Competition ===
- Short Film Palme d'Or: After Rain by Péter Mészáros
- Short Film Jury Prize:
  - A Very Very Silent Film by Manish Jha
  - The Stone of Folly by Jesse Rosensweet

== Independent Awards ==
=== FIPRESCI Prizes ===
- Divine Intervention by Elia Suleiman (Main Competition)
- Waiting for Happiness by Abderrahmane Sissako (Un Certain Regard)
- The Clay Bird by Tareque Masud (Directors' Fortnight)

=== Prize of the Ecumenical Jury ===
- The Man Without a Past by Aki Kaurismäki
  - Special Mention:
    - My Mother's Smile by Marco Bellocchio
    - The Son by Luc and Jean-Pierre Dardenner

=== Award of the Youth ===
- Foreign Film: Morvern Callar by Lynne Ramsay
- French Film: Carnages by Delphine Gleize

=== International Critics' Week ===
- International Critics' Week Grand Prize: Respiro by Emanuele Crialese
- Grand Golden Rail: Hypnotized and Hysterical (Hairstylist Wanted) by Claude Duty
- Small Golden Rail: From Mesmer, with Love or Tea for Two by Salvador Aguirre, Alejandro Lubezki
- Canal+ Award: From Mesmer, with Love or Tea for Two by Salvador Aguirre, Alejandro Lubezki
- Young Critics Award - Best Short: Meeting Evil by Reza Parsa
- Young Critics Award - Best Feature: Respiro by Emanuele Crialese
- Kodak Short Film Award: From Mesmer, with Love or Tea for Two by Salvador Aguirre, Alejandro Lubezki

=== Directors' Fortnight ===
- C.I.C.A.E. Award: Morvern Callar by Lynne Ramsay
- Gras Savoye Award: Mémoires incertaines by Michale Boganim

=== François Chalais Award ===
- Marooned in Iraq by Bahman Ghobadi

== Media ==
- INA: Woody Allen opens the 2002 Festival (commentary in French)
- INA: Closing ceremony and prize-giving of the 2002 Festival (commentary in French)
