= Kova Tilavpur =

Football agent

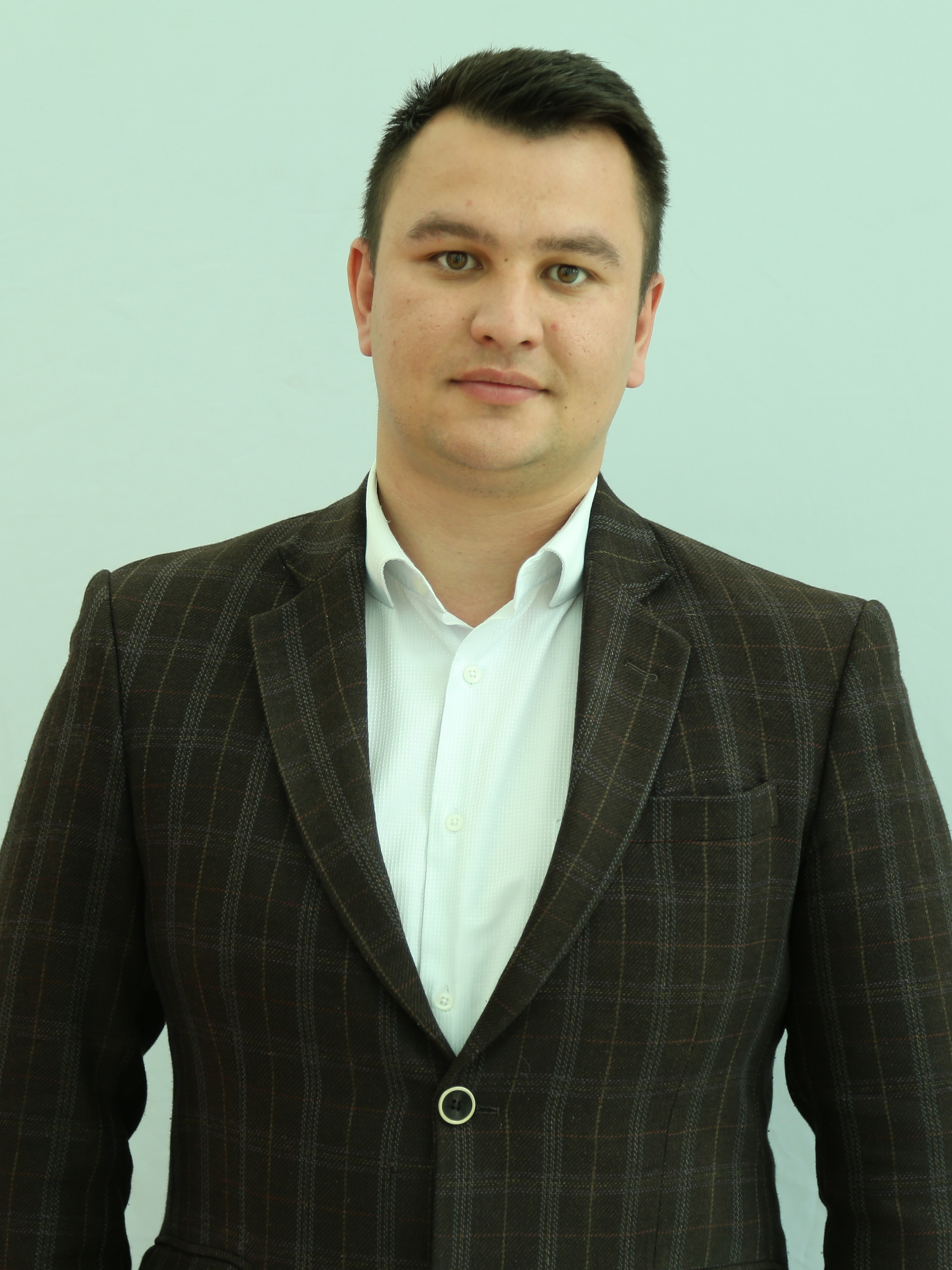
- Born: 16 August 1993 (age 33); Asht District, Sughd Region, Tajikistan
- Occupations: Sports agent, Musical artist, Film actor, Journalist
- Years active: 2001–present

Kova Tilavpur (Tajik: Кова Тилавпур; born 13 August 1993, Asht District, Sughd Region, Tajikistan), is a Tajik football agent, musical artist, journalist, and film actor. He is a member of the Tajik Union of Journalists.

Kova works as a football agent and has worked in the transfers of players Omid Ebrahimi, Nuriddin Davronov, Ahtam Nazarov, Jahongir Ergashev, Shahrom Samiev, Ehson Panjshanbe, Fathullo Fathulloev and others.

== Early life ==
Kova Tilavpur was born on August 16, 1993, in Asht District in the family of Tajik journalist Tilav Rasulzoda. Graduated from secondary school No. 8 in Khujand, Khujand State University, Tajik State Institute of Languages, Imam Khomeini International University and Allameh Tabataba'i University.

== Filmography ==
In 2001, he played the role of Yatim in the film Angel on the Right directed by Jamshed Usmonov.

== Music ==
Since 2011 Tilavpur has been engaged in professional music, in the genre of rap and hip hop. In 2016 he released the album "Hands of Hands".

1. Даст ба даст “Hands of hands”
2. Vaqte yodam meoi
3. Mother
4. Bas Nakard
5. Giriftori tu hastam
6. Nolai be sado
7. Modare man & Baraka 2015, together with the Baraka group, performs the duet song "Modareman"
