= Carnage (2002 film) =

2002 film

- Film poster
- Directed by: Delphine Gleize
- Written by: Delphine Gleize
- Produced by: Antonio Bazaga; Denis Delcampe; Jérôme Dopffer
- Starring: Chiara Mastroianni
- Cinematography: Crystel Fournier
- Edited by: François Quiqueré
- Music by: Éric Neveux; Jérôme Rebotier; David Hadjadj
- Distributed by: Diaphana Films
- Release dates: 17 May 2002 (Cannes); 13 November 2002 (France)
- Running time: 130 minutes
- Country: France
- Language: French
- Budget: €3.4 million
- Box office: $60,158

Carnage (French: Carnages) is a 2002 French drama film directed by Delphine Gleize. It was screened in the Un Certain Regard section at the 2002 Cannes Film Festival.

== Cast ==
- Chiara Mastroianni as Carlotta
- Ángela Molina as Alicia
- Lio as Betty
- Lucia Sanchez as Jeanne
- Esther Gorintin as Rosie
- Marilyne Even as Lucie
- Clovis Cornillac as Alexis
- Jacques Gamblin as Jacques
- Féodor Atkine as Paco
- Juliette Noureddine as Monica
- Pascal Bongard as Henri
- Bernard Sens as Luc
- Raphaëlle Molinier as Winnie
- Julien Lescarret as Victor
- Pascal N'Zonzi as The Cow Man
- Luc Delhumeau as The Deaf Man

== Critical response ==
On Rotten Tomatoes, the film holds an approval rating of 78%, based on 36 reviews, with an average rating of 6.9/10. On Metacritic the film has a score of 71 out of 100, based on 19 critics, indicating "generally favorable reviews".

== Accolades ==
Award / Film Festival	Category	Recipients and nominees	Result
Avignon Film Festival	Prix SACD		Won
Cannes Film Festival	Prix Un certain regard		Nominated
Cannes Film Festival	Award of the Youth - French Film		Won
César Awards	Best First Feature Film		Nominated
BFI London Film Festival	Sutherland Trophy		Won
Molodist International Film Festival	Best Full-Length Fiction Film		Won
Stockholm International Film Festival	Best Screenplay	Delphine Gleize	Won
