= Tharlo =

- Directed by: Pema Tseden
- Written by: Pema Tseden
- Produced by: Wu Leilei; Wang Xuebo; Zhang Xianmin
- Starring: Shide Nyima
- Cinematography: Lu Songye
- Edited by: Song Bing
- Music by: Wang Jue
- Production companies: Heaven Pictures (Beijing) Culture & Media Co., Ltd. Beijing YiHe Star Film Production Ltd. Beijing Ocean & Time Culture Communication Co, Ltd
- Distributed by: Beijing Herui Film Icarus Films
- Release dates: September 5, 2015 (Venice); December 9, 2016 (China)
- Running time: 123 minutes
- Country: China
- Language: Tibetan
- Box office: CN¥949,000

Tharlo (Chinese: 塔洛) is a 2015 Chinese Tibetan-language comedy-drama film written and directed by Pema Tseden. It premiered in the Horizons section at the 72nd edition of the Venice Film Festival. It was released in China on December 9, 2016, and on DVD by Icarus Films on February 14, 2017.

== Plot ==
Sheep herder Tharlo (Shide Nyima), commonly known as "Ponytail" for his trademark hairstyle, goes to town to get an ID card photo as ordered by police chief Dorje (Tashi). Having lived all his life alone in the mountains, he is shocked to meet a modern young hairdresser Yangtso (Yang Shik Tso), who not only sports short hair but smokes. Yangtso flirts and even suggests travelling with him. He gets drunk at a karaoke bar and ends up spending the night at her home.

Tharlo returns to the mountains but not for long. One day, he gets drunk again and a number of the sheep he tends are killed by wolves, which angers the sheep owner, who scolds and slaps him repeatedly. Soon, Tharlo returns to town with a large stack of cash from selling the sheep, places the money in front of Yangtso, and tells her to keep it. She asks to shave his head so that he won't be recognized and he agrees. But his desire for a new life with her is dashed when he wakes up the next morning to find her missing.

After failing to find her, Tharlo calls on chief Dorje at the police station. However, before he can reveal the purpose of his visit, the chief orders him to go to town again and get another ID card photo because the bald Tharlo looks different from his new ID card photo. Speechless, Tharlo walks out of the police station and heads back into the mountains. After his motorbike runs out of gas, he begins drinking again, then lights a firecracker in his hand. Just before it explodes, the screen goes black.

== Cast ==
- Shide Nyima as Tharlo
- Yang Shik Tso as Yangtso
- Tashi as Police chief Dorje
- Jinpa as Sheep owner
- Dekyi Tserang as singer (Special appearance)

== Reception ==
=== Box office ===
The film grossed CN¥949,000 at the Chinese box office.

=== Accolades ===
| Date | Award | Category | Nominee | Result | Notes |
|---|---|---|---|---|---|
| 2015 | 72nd Venice International Film Festival | Venice Horizons Award | Tharlo | Nominated | |
| 2015 | 52nd Golden Horse Film Festival and Awards | Best Director | Pema Tseden | Nominated | |
| 2015 | 52nd Golden Horse Film Festival and Awards | Best Adapted Screenplay | Tharlo | Won | |
| 2015 | 52nd Golden Horse Film Festival and Awards | Best Feature Film | Tharlo | Nominated | |
| 2015 | 16th International Film Festival Tokyo Filmex | Grand Prize | Tharlo | Won | |
| 2015 | 16th International Film Festival Tokyo Filmex | Student Jury Prize | Tharlo | Won | |
| 2016 | 23rd Beijing College Student Film Festival | Artistic Exploration Award | Tharlo | Won | |
| 2016 | 23rd Beijing College Student Film Festival | Best Picture | Tharlo | Nominated | |
| 2016 | 23rd Beijing College Student Film Festival | Best Director | Pema Tseden | Nominated | |
| 2017 | 17th Chinese Film Media Awards | Best Film | Tharlo | Nominated | |
| 2017 | 17th Chinese Film Media Awards | Best Director | Pema Tseden | Nominated | |
| 2017 | 17th Chinese Film Media Awards | Best Actor | Shide Nyima | Nominated | |
| 2017 | 17th Chinese Film Media Awards | Best Screenplay | Pema Tseden | Nominated | |
| 2017 | 17th Chinese Film Media Awards | Best New Performer | Shide Nyima | Nominated | |
| 2017 | 31st Golden Rooster Awards | Best Low Budget Feature | Tharlo | Won | |
| 2017 | 31st Golden Rooster Awards | Best Cinematography | Lu Yesong | Nominated | |
| 2017 | 31st Golden Rooster Awards | Best Editing | Liang Chi-song, Song Bing | Nominated | |
