= Mr. Six (film) =

- Poster

Chinese name
- Traditional Chinese: 老炮兒
- Simplified Chinese: 老炮儿
Transcriptions
Standard Mandarin
- Hanyu Pinyin: Lǎopào'ér
- Directed by: Guan Hu
- Written by: Dong Runnian
- Produced by: Wang Zhonglei
- Starring: Feng Xiaogang; Zhang Hanyu; Xu Qing; Li Yifeng; Kris Wu
- Cinematography: Pan Lou
- Edited by: Wen Zhang
- Music by: Peng Dou
- Production company: Huayi Brothers & Taihe Film Investment
- Release dates: 12 September 2015 (Venice); 24 December 2015 (China)
- Running time: 136 minutes
- Country: China
- Language: Mandarin
- Box office: US$139 million

Mr. Six (Chinese: 老炮儿) (previously known as Fading Wave) is a 2015 Chinese crime drama film directed by Guan Hu and written by Dong Runnian. It stars Feng Xiaogang, Zhang Hanyu, Xu Qing, Li Yifeng and Kris Wu. The film closed the 72nd Venice International Film Festival in an out-of-competition screening and was screened in the Special Presentations section of the 2015 Toronto International Film Festival. Feng won the Best Actor Award at the 52nd Golden Horse Awards for his performance in the film. Mr. Six was released on 24 December 2015 in China.

== Plot ==
Mr. Six tells of a 50-or-so-year-old street punk called "Mr. Six" who has reigned over the Beijing streets as the neighbourhood kingpin for many years. One day, he learns his son Xiaobo ("Little Bo") is in dispute with a well-connected young street-racing gang leader, Xiaofei. Mr. Six steps up to help defend him. He attempts to settle the debts of his son by relying on his old school rules and by the help of his old friends. Though things do not go as expected, Mr. Six and his son are in deep trouble. Meanwhile, he is diagnosed with coronary artery disease. In his attempt to stand by his principle, he wages war against the opposing group. Mr. Six's old gang members who are in different places come to join with him where Mr. Six were unfortunately die in the midst of the fight due to his terminal diseases. In the end, the son is shown well and running an open-bar as he promised. His gang members are bailed out from jail by their own group influence. The opposing gang members' leader were arrested after the news about his corrupted family is exposed.

== Cast ==
- Feng Xiaogang as Mr. Six, formal name Zhang Xuejun
- Zhang Hanyu as Mensan'er (Scrapper)
- Xu Qing as Hua Xiazi (Ms. Chatterbox)
- Li Yifeng as Xiaobo/Bobby (Mr. Six's son)
- Kris Wu as Xiaofei (Kris)
- Liu Hua as Dengzhao'er (Lampshade)
- Liang Jing as Dengzhao'er's wife
- Wu Jinyan as Zheng Hong
- Congo Pax
- Yu Hewei
- Lian Yiming
- Shang Yuxian
- Zhang Yi
- Zhang Yishan
- Ning Hao
- TFBoys

== Production ==
Principal photography commenced in late November 2014 in Beijing and ended in February 2015. On 12 December 2014, Feng Xiaogang, Liu Hua, Zhang Hanyu, Wang Zhonglei, Guan Hu, Li Yifeng, Xu Qing, Liang Jing, and Kris Wu attended the opening ceremony.

== Reception ==
=== Box office ===
The film grossed US$27 million on its opening weekend in China and went on to take the top spot during the Holiday period. It grossed $139 million overall.

=== Accolades ===
Award	Category	Recipient(s) and nominee(s)	Result	Notes
7th Macau International Movie Festival	Best Picture	Mr. Six	Nominated	
7th Macau International Movie Festival	Best Director	Guan Hu	Nominated	
7th Macau International Movie Festival	Best Actor	Feng Xiaogang	Nominated	
7th Macau International Movie Festival	Best Supporting Actor	Zhang Hanyu	Nominated	
7th Macau International Movie Festival	Best Supporting Actress	Xu Qing	Nominated	
7th Macau International Movie Festival	Best Cinematography	Luo Pan	Nominated	
52nd Golden Horse Film Awards	Best Original Screenplay	Guan Hu, Dong Runnian	Nominated	
52nd Golden Horse Film Awards	Best Actor	Feng Xiaogang	Won	
7th China Film Director's Guild Awards	Best Film	Mr. Six	Won	
7th China Film Director's Guild Awards	Best Director	Guan Hu	Won	
7th China Film Director's Guild Awards	Best Actor	Feng Xiaogang	Won	
23rd Beijing College Student Film Festival	Best Actor	Feng Xiaogang	Won	
23rd Beijing College Student Film Festival	Organizing Committee Award	Mr. Six	Won	
33rd Hundred Flowers Awards	Best Film	Mr. Six	Nominated	
33rd Hundred Flowers Awards	Best Director	Guan Hu	Nominated	
33rd Hundred Flowers Awards	Best Actor	Feng Xiaogang	Nominated	
33rd Hundred Flowers Awards	Best Actress	Xu Qing	Won	
33rd Hundred Flowers Awards	Best Supporting Actor	Li Yifeng	Won	
33rd Hundred Flowers Awards	Best Supporting Actress	Liang Jing	Nominated	
20th Huading Awards	Best Film	Mr. Six	Won	
20th Huading Awards	Best Director	Guan Hu	Won	
12th Chinese American Film Festival	Golden Angel Award Film	Mr. Six	Won	
12th Chinese American Film Festival	Best Actress	Xu Qing	Won	
10th Asian Film Awards	Best Film	Mr. Six	Nominated	
10th Asian Film Awards	Best Director	Guan Hu	Nominated	
10th Asian Film Awards	Best Actor	Feng Xiaogang	Nominated	
10th Asian Film Awards	Best Cinematographer	Luo Pan	Nominated	
31st Golden Rooster Awards	Best Picture	Mr. Six	Nominated	
31st Golden Rooster Awards	Best Director	Guan Hu	Nominated	
31st Golden Rooster Awards	Best Actor	Feng Xiaogang	Nominated	
31st Golden Rooster Awards	Best Writing	Guan Hu, Dong Runnian	Won	
31st Golden Rooster Awards	Best Original Music Score	Dou Peng	Nominated	
36th Hong Kong Film Awards	Best Film from Mainland and Taiwan	Mr. Six	Nominated	
