= The Sun Beaten Path =

The Sun-Beaten Path is a 2011 Tibetan film directed by Sonthar Gyal. The film won the Dragons & Tigers Award at the 2011 Vancouver International Film Festival. The film narrates the life of a grieving and guilt-ridden young farmer returning from a pilgrimage to Lhasa, after causing his mother's death in a tragic road accident.
