= Peng Sanyuan =

Chinese film director

- 彭三源
- Born: Peng Mingyan
- Education: Capital Normal University, Beijing Film Academy
- Occupations: Screenwriter, film director
- Years active: 2000 - present

Peng Sanyuan (Chinese: 彭三源), born Peng Mingyan (Chinese: 彭名燕), is a Chinese female film director, a writer from mainland China, a screenwriter of film and television works, and a member of the China Writers Association.

== Biography ==
=== Early life and education ===
As a child born in the countryside, Peng Sanyuan's family was poor. Her mother had to go over the mountains to relatives' homes to "borrow food". Peng's childhood did not reveal her talent for writing, and she did not receive a prize from the school for writing a runaway essay in a joint examination. After that, she wrote her first essay "My Mother in the North".

Peng Sanyuan graduated from the Department of Educational Psychology, Capital Normal University in 1992. In 2002, she graduated from the director training class of Beijing Film Academy.

=== Writing ===
Peng is the author of a collection of essays Bitter Water Roses (Chinese: 苦水玫瑰, Sichuan Literature and Art Publishing House, 1996) and the novel Beijing Life (Chinese: 北京生活, Writers Publishing House, 1996). In August 2000, Peng cooperated with Wong Liankwai on This is family life (Chinese: 今生是亲人, 2000).

== Career ==
After Peng graduated from the director training class of Beijing Film Academy, she was assigned to teach in a middle school with her main occupation and her secondary occupation being writing.

In March 2011, she signed a contract with Huayi Brothers and set up her own film production studio, officially becoming a film and television producer.

=== Film and television work ===
In 1999, her screenwriting and producing credits include TV series I'm a Relative in This Life (Chinese: 今生是亲人, 2000). In 2000, she was the scriptwriter of the period romance Nine Nine Return to One (Chinese: 九九归一, 2000), which tells the life of a pair of half-brothers who walk with the century, one master and one servant, through a century of changes and sorrow. In 2001, she co-wrote the screenplay for the urban romance Urban Beauty (Chinese: 都市丽人行, 2001), directed by Li Jiaqi. And in 2002, Peng wrote the screenplay for the TV series Back of the Palm (Chinese: 手心手背, 2002), which co-starred Zhuang Xin, Fang Bin and Liu Chang. In the same year, she wrote the screenplay for the plot film Bonus, directed by He Jianjun.

In 2004, he was the scriptwriter of the urban romantic drama Blue Bird Sky (Chinese: 青鸟的天空, 2004), which is about the seemingly mundane emotional entanglements between several young men and women in a modern city. In the same year, she was the scriptwriter of the TV series Begonia Still (Chinese: 海棠依旧, 2016), which was based on the book My Uncle Zhou Enlai written by Zhou Bingde. In 2005, she was the scriptwriter of the family drama Halfway Couples (Chinese: 半路夫妻, 2004), directed by Liu Huining, for which she was shortlisted for the Best Screenplay Award at the 13th Shanghai TV Festival. In 2006, she was the scriptwriter of the urban emotional drama Close to You & Make Me Warm (Chinese: 靠近你，温暖我, 2006), which is about three women in an abnormal emotional state, how they step by step get out of their psychological difficulties, find their emotions again and transcend themselves. On 18 December 2006, she was the scriptwriter of the military suspense spy drama The Guest on the Iceberg (Chinese: 冰山上的来客，2006), which was adapted from the 1963 film of the same name.

On 1 March 2007, she co-wrote the drama Brothers (Chinese: 亲兄热弟, 2007), starring Zhang Guo and Chen Jianbin. In 2009, she co-wrote the drama You'll Never Walk Alone (Chinese: 你永远不会孤行, 2009), starring Zhao Ziqi, Liu Yun and Niu Qingfeng. In 2010, on 19 October, she co-wrote the drama You Are My Brother (Chinese: 你是我兄弟, 2009), directed by Liu Huining.

On 11 December 2011, she was the scriptwriter of the family drama People to Forty (Chinese:人到四十, 2011), directed by Pang Hao. On 23 July 2012, she was the producer of the school youth drama Youth Code (Chinese: 青春守则, 2012), which started production in Xiamen. In the same year, she was the scriptwriter of the urban police drama No Thief (Chinese: 无贼, 2012) with Geng Xuhong and Zhu Yan, which tells the story of a tangled couple of thieves and the family of the police station chief. In 2014, she was the scriptwriter of the love family drama Love in the Left and Right Hand (Chinese: 左手亲情右手爱, 2014), which tells the story of two families in the 1970s and their "misplaced" emotions for more than 30 years.

After learning about the large numbers of missing children lost to human trafficking in China, she wrote and directed her first film Lost and Love (Lost Orphan in the original Chinese title) a Mandarin-language film produced by Huayi Brothers. The film starred award-winning Hong Kong actor Andy Lau and portrayed a farmer's search for his missing son. Sandra Ng had a cameo appearance as a child trafficker. The film was based on the story of Guo Gangtang, a farmer in Shandong province who traveled 400,000 kilometers across China to look for his son. It was released in China on 20 March 2015. Her novel Lost Orphans was also published in March 2015. The film won the 16th Huabiao Award for Outstanding Film, and she received the Best Screenplay Award at the 13th Changchun Film Festival.

In 2017, she served as a screenwriter for the urban emotional drama "The Many Years You're Late" (Chinese: 你迟到的许多年, 2017), which was adapted from Yan Geling's novel "Mending Jade Mountain House", for which she was shortlisted for the Best Screenplay (Adaptation) Award at the 25th Shanghai TV Festival - White Magnolia Awards.

In August 2020, she was the director and scriptwriter of the unit "My Name is Dalian" (Chinese: 我叫大连, 2020) in the anti-epidemic drama "Together" (Chinese: 在一起, 2020).

=== Filmography ===
Film
Year	Title
2015	Lost and Love

Television series
Year	Title
2020	My name is Dalian
2017	The Many Years You're Late
2014	Love in the Left and Right Hand
2013	No Thief
2013	Youth Code
2011	People to Forty
2010	You Are My Brother
2009	You'll Never Walk Alone
2007	Brothers
2006	Close to You & Make Me Warm
2006	The Guest on the Iceberg
2005	Halfway Couples
2004	Begonia Still
2004	Blue Bird Sky
2002	Back of the Palm
2002	Bouns
2001	Urban Beauty
2000	Nine Nine Return to One
1999	This is family life

=== Awards and nominations ===
Year	Awards	Category	Nominated work	Result
2019	25th Shanghai TV Festival	White Magnolia Award for Best Screenplay (Adaptation) Award	The Many Years You're Late	Nominated
2016	13th Changchun Film Festival	Best Screenplay	Lost and Love	Won
2016	13th Changchun Film Festival	Best Chinese Feature Film	Lost and Love	Nominated
2015	16th Huabiao Award	Outstanding Film	Lost and Love	Won
2015	30th Golden Rooster Awards	Best Directorial Debut	Lost and Love	Nominated
2007	13th Shanghai TV Festival	White Magnolia Award for Best Screenplay	Halfway Couples	Nominated
