= Balloon (2019 Chinese film) =

2019 Chinese drama film

- Film poster

Chinese name
- Traditional Chinese: 氣球
- Simplified Chinese: 气球
Transcriptions
Standard Mandarin
- Hanyu Pinyin: Qìqiú
- Directed by: Pema Tseden
- Written by: Pema Tseden
- Based on: Balloon by Pema Tseden
- Starring: Tso Yangshik
- Cinematography: Lǚ Songye
- Edited by: Liao Qingsong; Jin Di
- Music by: Peyman Yazdanian
- Production companies: Beijing Shengtang Times Culture Communication Co., Ltd. Factory Gate (Tianjin) Film Co., Ltd. Qinghai Manishi Film Co., Ltd. China Film Stellar Theater Chain iQiyi
- Release date: 30 August 2019 (Venice)
- Running time: 102 minutes
- Country: China
- Languages: Chinese; Tibetan

Balloon (Chinese: 气球) is a 2019 Chinese drama film written and directed by Pema Tseden. It was screened in the Horizons section at the 76th Venice International Film Festival.

== Synopsis ==
The film evokes a Tibetan family's struggle between religious conservatism and sexual emancipation. Drolkar and her husband have three sons and are sheep farmers. In order to comply with the one-child policy implemented by the Chinese authorities, Drolkar uses condoms as a means of contraception, a practice that is not very widespread in this traditional society.

== Cast ==
- Tso Yangshik
- Wangmo Sonam
- Kalsang Jinpa

== Accolades ==
| Date | Award | Category | Recipient(s) and nominee(s) | Result | Notes |
|---|---|---|---|---|---|
| 2019 | 5th Chicago International Film Festival | Best Screenplay | Pema Tseden | Won | |
| 2019 | 76th Venice International Film Festival | | Balloon | Nominated | |
| 2019 | 2019 Toronto International Film Festival | Contemporary World Cinema | Balloon | Nominated | |
| 2019 | 24th Busan International Film Festival | A Window on Asian Cinema | Balloon | Nominated | |
| 2019 | 20th Tokyo Filmex | | Balloon | Won | |
| 2019 | Asia-Pacific Film Festival | Best Film | Balloon | Nominated | |
| 2019 | 2nd Hainan Island International Film Festival | Best Film | Balloon | Won | |
