= Angel on the Right =

2002 film

- Directed by: Jamshed Usmonov
- Written by: Jamshed Usmonov
- Produced by: Jamshed Usmonov
- Starring: Uktamoi Miyasarova
- Cinematography: Pascal Lagriffoul
- Edited by: Jacques Comets
- Music by: Michael Galasso
- Release date: 24 May 2002
- Running time: 91 minutes
- Country: Tajikistan
- Language: Tajik

Angel on the Right (Tajik: Фариштаи китфи рост, Farishtai kitfi rost; Persian: فرشته کتف راست) is a 2002 Tajik comedy-drama film directed by Jamshed Usmonov. It was screened in the Un Certain Regard section at the 2002 Cannes Film Festival.

== Plot ==
This dark comedy, the third feature film for Jamshed Usmonov, is set, and filmed on location, in the Tajik town of Asht. After serving a long prison sentence, a remorseless man returns to his home village. While trying to help his mother die with dignity, the man endures multiple run-ins with the unyielding villagers who expect to collect on his myriad overdue debts. The cast of this film is the real-life population of the town of Asht itself. Usmonov cast his own mother and brother for the lead roles in the film.

== Cast ==
- Uktamoi Miyasarova as Halima
- Maruf Pulodzoda as Hamro
- Kova Tilavpur as Yatim
- Mardonkul Kulbobo as Mayor
- Malohat Maqsumova as Savri
- Furkat Burlev as The Barman
- Orzuqui Kholikov as Young man with goat
- Hokim Rakhmonov as Dervish
- Tolib Temuraliev as The Millionaire
- Davras Azimov as The Doormaker
