= Terra incognita (2002 film) =

- Directed by: Ghassan Salhab
- Written by: Ghassan Salhab
- Produced by: Nicolas Blanc
- Starring: Carol Abboud
- Cinematography: Jacques Bouquin
- Edited by: Gladys Joujou
- Release date: 18 May 2002
- Running time: 120 minutes
- Countries: Lebanon; France
- Languages: French; Arabic

Terra incognita is a 2002 Lebanese-French drama film directed by Ghassan Salhab. It was screened in the Un Certain Regard section at the 2002 Cannes Film Festival.

== Cast ==
- Carol Abboud - Soraya
- Abla Khoury - Leila
- Walid Sadek - Nadim
- Rabih Mroué - Tarek
- Carlos Chahine - Haidar
