= Golden Rooster Award for Best Directorial Debut =

Chinese Film Awards

Golden Rooster Awards for Best Directorial Debut
- Awarded for: Best Directorial Debut of the year
- Country: China
- Presented by: China Film Association; China Federation of Literary and Art Circles; Xiamen Municipal People's Government; 1905.com
- First award: 1981
- Final award: 2023
- Winner (2023): Liu Xiaoshi for Born to Fly
- Website: Golden Rooster Awards

Golden Rooster for Best Directorial Debut (中国电影金鸡奖最佳导演处女作) is the main category of Competition of Golden Rooster Awards, awarding to new director who directed the first feature film.

== 1980s ==
Year	Winner and nominees (English)	Winner and nominees (Chinese)	English title	Original title
1989	N/A			
1989	Tu Gongyi	吐贡依	Family of Bachelors	光棍之家

== 1990s ==
Year	Winner and nominees (English)	Winner and nominees (Chinese)	English title	Original title
1990	Huang Jun	黄军	Childhood in Ruijin	童年在瑞金
1991	Gu Rong	古榕	Peking Duck Restaurant	老店
1992	N/A			
1992	Hu Xueyang	胡雪杨	Grass Widow	留守女士
1996	Huo Jianqi	霍建起	Winner	赢家
1997	Zhou Bo	周波	Wolf Life	捕狼人生
1997	Lu Wei	芦苇	Ways to Xixia	西夏路迢迢
1998	Zhang Yang	张扬	Spicy Love Soup	爱情麻辣烫
1998	Shi Xuehai	石雪海	White Camel	白骆驼
1999	Jin Chen	金琛	Love in the Internet Age	网络时代的爱情
1999	Li Hong	李虹	The Charila	遥望查理拉
1999	Wang Xiaolie	王小列	Fly Away Home	伴你高飞

== 2000s ==
Year	Winner and nominees (English)	Winner and nominees (Chinese)	English title	Original title
2000	N/A			
2001	Qi Xing	齐星	Escort	押解的故事
2002	Huang Hong	黄宏	25 Kids and a Dad	二十五个孩子一个爹
2002	Wu Bing	吴兵	Tea	苦茶香
2003	Xu Jinglei	徐静蕾	My Father and I	我和爸爸
2003	Wulan Tana	乌兰塔娜	Warm Spring	暖春
2004	Fang Gangliang	方刚亮	On the Way to School	上学路上
2004	Xiao Jiang	小江	Electric Shadows	电影往事
2004	Xie Dong	谢东	The Winter Solstice	冬至
2005	Pema Tseden	万玛才旦	The Silent Holy Stones	静静的嘛呢石
2005	Liu Hao	刘浩	Two Great Sheep	好大一对羊
2005	Gu Changwei	顾长卫	Peacock	孔雀
2006-2007	An Lan	安澜	Night Attack	夜袭
2006-2007	Yin Lichuan	尹丽川	The Park	公园
2006-2007	Zhuang Yuxin	庄宇新	Teeth of Love	爱情的牙齿
2006-2007	Zou Yalin	邹亚林	Red Jacket	红棉袄
2006-2007	He Xiaojiang	和小江	Being A Son and Comrade	儿子同志
2006-2007	Hu Yaozhi	扈耀之	Cong Fei	丛飞
2008-2009	Li Dawei	李大为	A Tale of Two Donkeys	走着瞧
2008-2009	Xierzhati Yahepu	西尔扎堤·牙合甫	2008 of Maimaiti	买买提的2008
2008-2009	Huang He	黄河	Deng Pingshou	我是花下肥泥巴
2008-2009	Peng Jiahuang/Peng Chen	彭家煌、彭臣	Walk to School	走路上学

== 2010s ==
Year	Winner and nominees (English)	Winner and nominees (Chinese)	English title	Original title
2010-2011	Lu Yang	路阳	The Spectacular Theatre	盲人电影院
2010-2011	Deng Ke	邓科	Autumn of Bad Boys	坏孩子的秋天
2010-2011	Du Bo/Guo Zhirong	杜波、郭志荣	Blue School	蓝学校
2010-2011	Gao Feng	高峰	An Eternal Lamb	永生羊
2010-2011	Jiang Wenli	蒋雯丽	Lan	我们天上见
2012-2013	Zhao Wei	赵薇	So Young	致我们终将逝去的青春
2012-2013	Qu Jiangtao	曲江涛	A Grandson From America	孙子从美国来
2012-2013	De Gena/Du Liang	德格娜、杜粮	Latitude 52	老哨卡
2012-2013	Du Jiayi	杜家毅	Kora	转山
2012-2013	Liu Haodong	刘浩东	Cobble	鹅卵石
2014-2015	Chen Jianbin	陈建斌	A Fool	一个勺子
2014-2015	Xu Ang	徐昂	12 Citizens	十二公民
2014-2015	Peng Sanyuan	彭三源	Lost and Love	失孤
2014-2015	Xie You	谢悠	Qing se ri ji	青涩日记
2016-2017	Wen Zhang	文章	When Larry Met Mary	陆垚知马俐
2016-2017	Song Haolin	宋灏霖	Mr. Zhu's Summer	猪太狼的夏天
2016-2017	Derek Tsang	曾国祥	Soul Mate	七月与安生
2018-2019	Wen Muye	文牧野	Dying to Survive	我不是药神
2018-2019	Wang Lina	王丽娜	A First Farewell	第一次的离别
2018-2019	Rene Liu	刘若英	Us and Them	后来的我们
2018-2019	Peng Li	彭力	Find My Way Home	小狗奶瓶
2018-2019	Teng Congcong	滕丛丛	Send Me to the Clouds	送我上青云

== 2020s ==
Year	Winner and nominees	English title	Original title
2020	Shen Ao	My Dear Liar	受益人
2020	Li Ji	A Road To Spring	通往春天的列车
2020	Zhou Sun	Becoming Li Jiahe	少女佳禾
2020	Dong Run-nian	Gone with the Light	被光抓走的人
2021	Jia Ling	Hi, Mom	你好，李焕英
2021	Yu Fei	Little Canned Men	皮皮鲁与鲁西西之罐头小人
2021	Dadren Wanggyal	Gone with the Wind	随风飘散
2021	Boyanhkeshig	Harhuu	哈日夫
2022	Liu Jiangjiang	Lighting Up the Stars	人生大事
2022	Li Gen	Before Next Spring	如果有一天我将会离开你
2022	Liu Xunzimo	Be Somebody	扬名立万
2022	Xing Wenxiong	Too Cool to Kill	这个杀手不太冷静
2022	Yang Chengcheng	Goodbye the Groundhog	再见土拨鼠
2023	Liu Xiaoshi	Born to Fly	长空之王
2023	Dashan Kong	Journey to the West	宇宙探索编辑部
2023	Bai Zhiqiang	Like Father and Son	拨浪鼓咚咚响
2023	Jack Ng	A Guilty Conscience	毒舌大狀
2024	Zhang Yudi	The Midsummer's Voice	倒仓
2024	Fei Yu	Football on the Roof	屋顶足球
2024	Liu Taifeng	Another Day of Hope	又是充满希望的一天
2024	Chen Xiaoyu	Gone with the Boat	乘船而去
2024	Jia Shengfeng	Lost Love	流水落花
2025	Gao Peng	A Long Shot	老枪
2025	Dajie Dingzeng	The Boy in the Moonlight	月光里的男孩
2025	Li Ji	Big Scene	大场面
2025	Qin Tian	Fate of the Moonlight	但愿人长久
2025	Huang Tingting	Lucky Pavilion	幸运阁
