= Madeleine Péloquin =

Canadian actress from Quebec

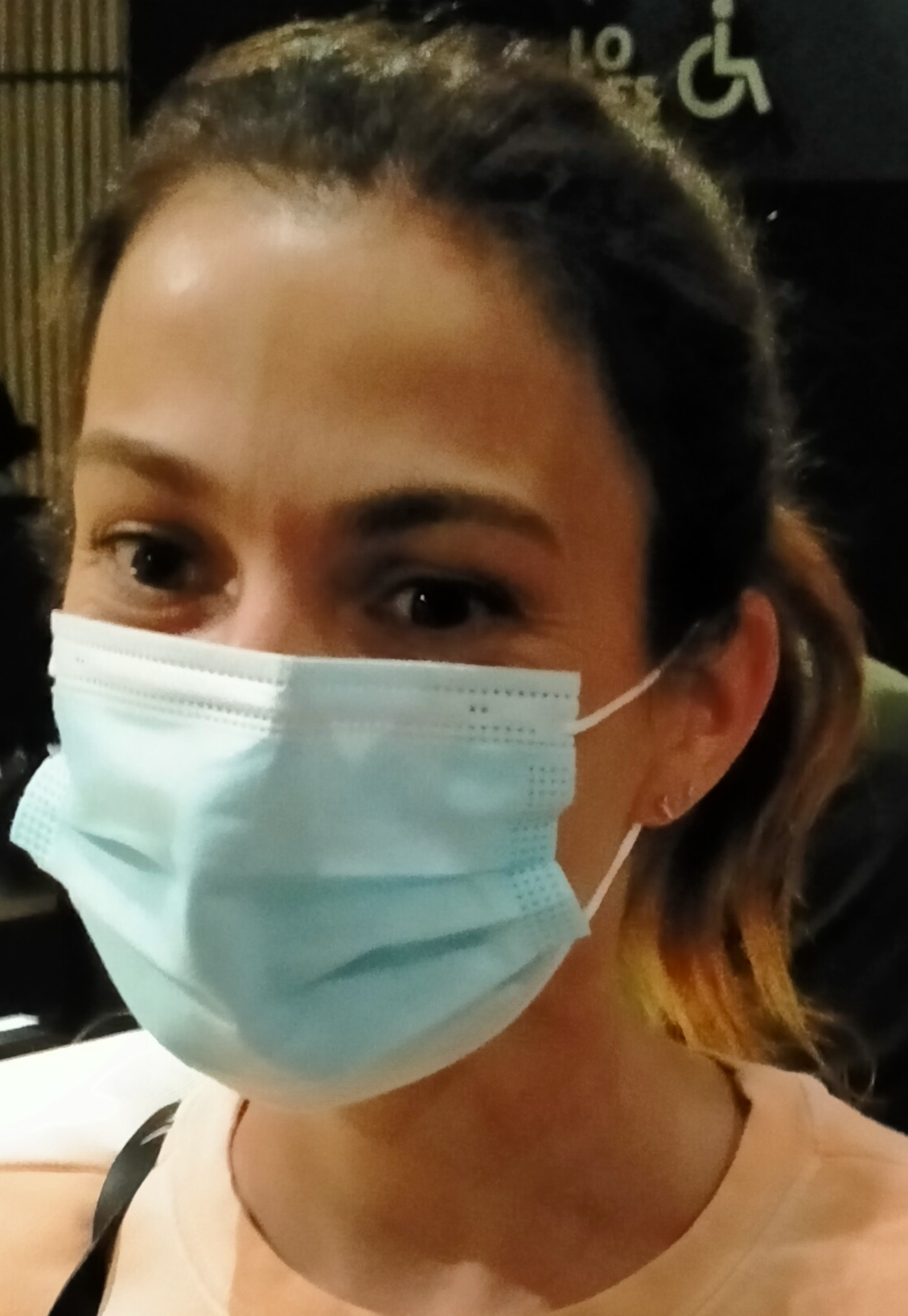
Madeleine Péloquin

Madeleine Péloquin is a Canadian actress from Quebec. She is most noted for her performance in the 2011 film For the Love of God (Pour l'amour de Dieu), for which she received a Jutra Award nomination for Best Actress at the 14th Jutra Awards in 2012.

== Filmography ==
=== Film ===
- Continental, a Film Without Guns (Continental, un film sans fusil) - 2007
- L'amour m… ou autres adjectifs - 2007
- Avant-goût de printemps - 2008
- For the Love of God (Pour l'amour de Dieu) - 2011
- Gerry - 2011
- Nitro Rush - 2016
- Major Junior (Junior Majeur) - 2017
- Humanist Vampire Seeking Consenting Suicidal Person (Vampire humaniste cherche suicidaire consentant) - 2023
- Victoire (La Cordonnière) - 2023

=== Television ===
- Chartrand et Simonne : Lysiane Gagnon - 2003
- Casting... à l'école de la vie! : Vinny Fitzpatrick - 2005
- C.A. : Mado - 2006-10
- Octobre 70 : Suzanne Lanctôt - 2007
- Les Lavigueur, la vraie histoire : animatrice télé - 2008
- Stan et ses stars : Stefka - 2008-09
- Grande fille : Maude - 2008-09
- Trauma : Martine Laliberté - 2010-14
- Rock et Rolland : Vinny - 2010-13
- 30 vies : Patricia Fillion - 2013
- La Galère : Marianne - 2013
- Au secours de Béatrice : Julie Lachapelle - 2014-18
- Ces gars-là : Audrey Hétu - 2015
- [Pour Sarah : Sophie - 2015
- Mirador : Patricia Desjardins - 2016
- Les Pays d'en haut : Angélique Pothier - 2016
- Web Thérapie : Monique Morin - 2017
- Béliveau : Élise Béliveau, jeune - 2017
- Alerte Amber : Valérie Sénéchal - 2019
