= Lost and Love =

2015 Chinese-Hong Kong film by Peng Sanyuan

- Chinese film poster
- Traditional Chinese: 失孤
- Simplified Chinese: 失孤
- Hanyu Pinyin: Shī Gū
- Jyutping: Sat1 Gu1
- Directed by: Peng Sanyuan
- Written by: Peng Sanyuan
- Produced by: Wang Zhonglei; Chan Pui-wah; Zhang Dajun
- Starring: Andy Lau; Jing Boran
- Cinematography: Mark Lee Ping Bin
- Edited by: Angie Lam
- Music by: Zbigniew Preisner
- Production companies: Huayi Brothers Media Group; Focus Films; Beijing Yuanhesheng Entertainment; Chongqing Film Group; Xiamen Navigation Media; Good Friends Entertainment; Huayi Brothers International
- Distributed by: Huayi Brothers (China); Edko Films (Hong Kong)
- Release dates: 19 March 2015 (Australia, New Zealand); 20 March 2015 (China); 26 March 2015 (Hong Kong)
- Running time: 108 minutes
- Countries: China; Hong Kong
- Languages: Standard Mandarin Chinese; Sichuanese
- Box office: US$34.9 million

Lost and Love is a 2015 road drama film written and directed by novelist and television screenwriter Peng Sanyuan in her directorial debut and starring Andy Lau and Jing Boran. A Chinese-Hong Kong co-production, the film is inspired by an actual abduction case in 2010 when a Hubei resident was reunited with his son, who had been missing for 3 years, when a university student recognized the child after seeing a post on Sina Weibo.

== Plot ==
One day in 1999 when his two-year-old son Lei Da went missing, Anhui farmer Lei Zekuan (Lau) begins his fifteen-year-long journey of hardship searching for his lost son. On his way he meets Zeng Shuai, a young car mechanic who was abducted as a child himself and is also searching for his parents.

== Cast ==
- Andy Lau as Lei Zekuan (雷澤寬), an Anhui farmer
- Jing Boran as Zeng Shuai (曾帥), a bike mechanic
- Ni Jingyang as Su Qin
- He Tao as Zhou Tianyi
- Tony Leung Ka-fai as a Chongqing Highway Patrolman (cameo)
- Sandra Ng as a Female Trafficker (cameo)
- Sun Haiying as Zeng Shuai's Birth Father
- Xu Di as Zeng Shuai's Birth Mother
- Ma Ge as an unspecified volunteer

== Production ==
Director Peng Sanyuan revealed that the role of Lei Zekuan was tailor-made for Lau.

Filming began on 10 March 2014 in Quanzhou, Fujian. Besides Quanzhou, filming also shift to many different provinces including in rural southwestern mountains where conditions are difficult. The shoot in Quanzhou attracted many onlookers in the streets as Lau's fans were eager to see their idol in his new look for the film and take pictures. This resulted in a major traffic jam and some fans even climbed a tree just to catch a glimpse of Lau.

On 14 April, the crew was spotted in Nanchang, Jiangxi where Lau was shooting a scene at the Nanchang bus station where he was pasting missing people notice on the pillars before being chased by uniformed security officers. Although the scene caught the attention of the public, nobody was able to recognize Lau.

Filming was shifted to Chongqing on 29 April. During the shoot in Chongqing, an incident happened where a female reporter was injured while running away from crew members who discovered her secretly photographing them Another incident occurred on 17 May during the shoot in Chengdu where a crew member quarreled with a female onlooker. The crew member was seen pushing the onlooker to the floor and struggling with her. Afterwards, Lau, who witnessed everything, was seen scolding the crew member for his mistakes.

After two and a half months of shooting throughout China, the filming of Lost and Love concluded on 23 May in Chengdu. As Lau was leaving Chengdu two days afterwards, he arranged a meetup with his fans.

== Release ==
On 8 May 2014, Huayi Brothers unveiled 32 films slated for production and distribution, with Lost and Love slated to be released in September 2014. On 15 January 2015, it was announced that the film would be set for release on 20 March 2015.

== Reception ==
=== Critical ===
Lost and Love received generally positive reviews from critics. Maggie Lee of Variety Film Reviews gave the film a positive review and writes "Notwithstanding some sentimental beats, Peng achieves a delicate balance between bleak realities and a life-affirming attitude, capped by a predictable but necessary catharsis." In Clarence Tsui's review for The Hollywood Reporter, he mainly praised Mark Lee Ping Bin's cinematography and writes "These lush depictions of city and country fill in the dots between the film's dramatic plot points, gently driving the story forward while hinting at the social climate of the day." Joe Bendel of Libertas Film Magazine gave the film a score of B+ and praises the performances of stars Andy Lau and Jing Boran, director Peng's direction and Lee's cinematography and concludes his review by writing "Despite some conspicuous loose ends, Lost and Love is a refreshingly mature and accessible drama, recommended for mainstream audiences." Tom Keogh of The Seattle Times rated the film 3 out of 4 stars and writes "Writer-director Peng Sanyuan gracefully cycles through ever-changing shifts in mood and tone, a reflection of the understandably mercurial emotions of the film's two lead characters, the middle-aged Lei (Hong Kong superstar Andy Lau) and the 20-ish Ceng (Jing Boran)." James Verniere of Boston Herald gave the film a score of A− praising Lau as "the reason to see China Lion’s Lost and Love, a powerful Chinese drama about the widespread problem of abducted children" and refers it as "a film that will appeal to and move everyone."

=== Box office ===
Lost and Love grossed US$18.17 million during its opening weekend, finishing in second place at the Chinese box office behind Hollywood film Cinderella. During its second week, the film dropped to third place, earning US$5.31 million between 27 and 29 March. After ten days of release, the film has earned US$32 million to date.

During the opening weekend of its limited release in North America, Lost and Love earned an estimated US$85,000 from 24 locations.

As of May 2015, the film have grossed a total US$34,180,000 in China, US$345,228 in Hong Kong, US$118,792 in Malaysia, US$14,787 in New Zealand, US$82,553 and US$188,817 in North America.

== Accolades ==
Accolades
Ceremony	Category	Recipient	Outcome
35th Hong Kong Film Awards	Best Actor	Andy Lau	Nominated
30th Golden Rooster Awards	Best Directorial Debut	Peng Sanyuan	Nominated
30th Golden Rooster Awards	Best Actor	Andy Lau	Nominated
30th Golden Rooster Awards	Best Supporting Actor	Jing Boran	Nominated
30th Golden Rooster Awards	Best Cinematography	Mark Lee Ping Bin	Nominated
16th Huabiao Awards	Best Actor	Andy Lau	Won

== Story of character prototype ==
The character prototype of this film is Guo Gangtang. On September 21, 1997, his 2-year-old son was abducted by a woman surnamed Tang while playing alone outside in Liaocheng. After that, he spent all his time searching for his son. He rode a motorcycle to search for clues all over China. And in 2012 he founded a website to collect information of missing children. In 2015, this adaptation of his story was released. Guo Gangtang hoped to let his son know that he is being sought through this film.

On July 11, 2021, Guo Gangtang informed the media that his son was found in Henan Province. After that, the police reported that they had cracked a case of kidnapping children, and after comparing the DNA information of the kidnapped child with the information of the missing child, it was confirmed that Guo Gangtang's son was found. After 24 years, the two finally met again. Some production staff, including Andy Lau, congratulated this.

== See also ==
- Andy Lau filmography
- Dearest (2014 film) — another film on child kidnapping in China
