= River (2015 Tibetan film) =

- Directed by: Sonthar Gyal
- Release date: February 11, 2015 (Berlin International Film Festival)
- Country: China
- Language: Tibetan

River is a 2015 drama film directed Sonthar Gyal. The film was shown to a great fanfare during 19th Shanghai International Film Festival in China.
