= Tibet Cheezheng Tibetan Medicine =

Tibet Cheezheng Tibetan Medicine (Chinese: 西藏奇正藏药股份有限公司), or Tibet Qizheng Tibetan Medicine Co., Ltd (abbreviated as Qizheng Tibetan Medicine, Chinese: 奇正藏药, SZSE: 002287) is a prominent firm in the Tibetan medicine sector in China, primarily focused on the research, development, manufacture, and sales of Tibetan medicinal products.

== History ==
In 1994, Yangjin Lamu encountered Lei Jufang (Chinese: 雷菊芳) during their collegiate years at Northwest Minzu University, and together they established Qizheng Tibetan Medicine in Nyingchi, Tibet in 1995. The company was listed on the Shenzhen Stock Exchange in 2009. The company currently possesses 22 wholly owned and holding subsidiaries, including GMP pharmaceutical factories and GSP marketing firms, employing 3,091 people. It offers 25 exclusive varieties and holds 141 drug approval numbers, with its products encompassing the musculoskeletal, nervous, digestive, cardio-cerebral, respiratory, urinary, gynecological, dermatological, and pediatric fields, among others.

In the 2016 Forbes list of China's 400 Richest, the company's founder Lei Jufang was considered the wealthiest Chinese woman in medicine. She was worth US$1.85 billion ranking No. 146 in the list.

== Products ==
Qingpeng ointment and Xiaotong paste are produced by the company. The Qingpeng ointment manufactured by the company has active ingredients such as Herba Oxytropis Falcatae (Jidou), Rhei Spiciforme Randix (Yadahuang), Radix Aconiti Flavi Et Penduli (Tiebangchui), Chebulae Fructus (Hezi), Phyllanthi Fructus (Yuganzi), and artificial Moschus (Shexiang).

The company also produce the Guijiu 25 pill (aolse nyer Lang in Tibetan).
