= For the Love of God (2011 film) =

2011 Canadian drama film

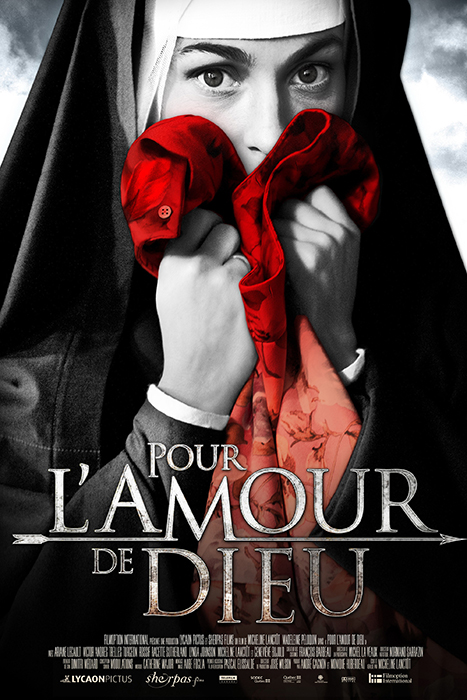
- French film poster
- French: Pour l'amour de Dieu
- Directed by: Micheline Lanctôt
- Written by: Micheline Lanctôt
- Produced by: André Gagnon; Monique Huberdeau
- Starring: Ariane Legault; Victor Andrés Trelles Turgeon; Madeleine Péloquin; Geneviève Bujold
- Cinematography: Michel La Veaux
- Edited by: Aube Foglia
- Music by: Catherine Major
- Production companies: Lycaon Pictures; Sherpa Films
- Distributed by: Métropole Films
- Release date: August 24, 2011 (Angoulême)
- Running time: 113 minutes
- Country: Canada
- Language: French

For the Love of God (French: Pour l'amour de Dieu) is a Canadian drama film, directed by Micheline Lanctôt and released in 2011. Based in part on a personal experience from Lanctôt's own childhood, the film centres on the sexual awakening of Léonie (Ariane Legault), a young girl attending convent school in 1959 who falls in love with Father Malachy (Victor Andrés Trelles Turgeon), the new school priest, and becomes jealous when she realizes that her teacher, Sister Cécile (Madeleine Péloquin), is also in love with him. The film also explores the effect of the experience on the three into the present day, with Lanctôt herself playing the role of the adult Léonie, Geneviève Bujold as the senior Sister Cécile and Nelson Villagra as the senior Fr. Malachy.

Rossif Sutherland also has a small role in the film as Jesus.

The film premiered on August 24, 2011, at the Angoulême Francophone Film Festival, where it won awards for Best Actress (Péloquin) and Best Film. It opened commercially in Quebec on September 2.

The film received six Jutra Award nominations at the 14th Jutra Awards, for Best Director (Lanctôt), Best Actress (Péloquin), Best Art Direction (Normand Sarazin), Best Cinematography (Michel La Veaux), Best Costume Design (François Barbeau) and Best Original Music (Catherine Major). Barbeau won the award for costume design.

At the Shanghai International Film Festival in 2012, the film won the Golden Goblet Jury Grand Prix.

== Cast ==
- Ariane Legault as Léonie (age 11)
- Madeleine Peloquin as Sister Cécile Eugenie
- Victor Andres Turgeon-Trelles as Father Malachy (credited as Victor Andres Trelles Turgeon)
- Genevieve Bujold as Sister Cecile (age 72)
- Micheline Lanctot as Léonie (age 62)
- Rossif Sutherland as Jesus (credited as Rossif Racette Sutherland)
- Nelson Villagra as Father Malachy (age 76)
- Lynda Johnson as Pauline (mother of Léonie)
- Lawrence Arcouette as Jacques (brother of Pauline)
- Marc Paquet as Gerard (father of Léonie)
- Suzanne Garceau as Mother Superior
