= Delphine Gleize =

French film director

- Born: 5 May 1973 (age 53); Saint-Quentin, Aisne, France
- Occupations: Film director, screenwriter
- Years active: 1998-present

Delphine Gleize (born 5 May 1973) is a French film director and screenwriter. She has directed ten films since 1998. Her film Carnages was screened in the Un Certain Regard section at the 2002 Cannes Film Festival.

== Filmography ==
- Sale battars (1998)
- Un château en Espagne (1999)
- Le piranha andalou (1999)
- Le légume en question (2000)
- Les méduses (2000)
- Carnages (2002)
- L'homme qui rêvait d'un enfant (2006)
- Instants fragiles (2008)
- Cavaliers seuls (documentary, 2010)
- La permission de minuit (2011)
