= Yangjin Lamu =

- Born: Tianzhu (Pari) Tibetan Autonomous County, Gansu Province, China
- Education: Northwest Minzu University
- Occupations: Musician; Author; Teacher of Buddhist practices
- Spouse: Mark Yuting Chen (陳宇廷) (m. 2002)
- Awards: The album Miho: Journey to the Mountain won the 53rd Grammy Award for Best New Age Album, "National Spirit Builder" award from, Life, a mainland Chinese magazine.

Yangjin Lamu is a spiritual musician, author, modern practitioner of Buddhism, and creator of Zen of Yangjinma. In 2011, Miho: Journey to the Mountain, an album that includes Yangjin's song Words of Wish Fulfillment won the 53rd Grammy Award for Best New Age Album. Yangjin accepted the award on behalf of the Paul Winter Consort and became the first Chinese singer to win a Grammy Award. Yangjin Lamu has produced and published four albums.

== Biography ==
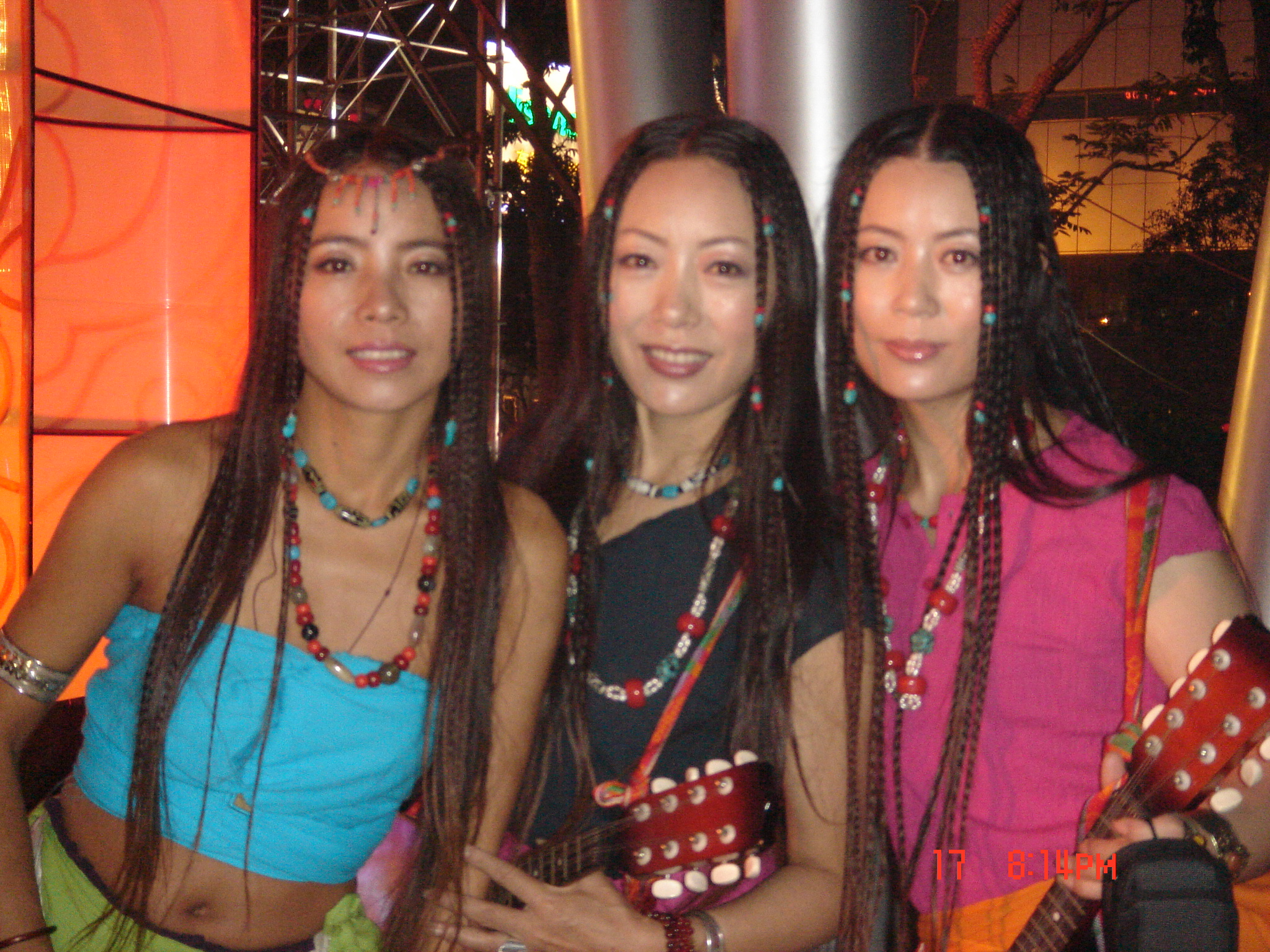
The Yangjiema Triad

Yangjin Lamu was born in Tianzhu (Pari) Tibetan Autonomous County in Gansu Province of China. She was admitted to the Art Department of Northwest Minzu University in 1993.

She founded Qizheng Tibetan Medicine Group with her friends Lei Jufang (Chinese: 雷菊芳), and family. In 1996, Yangjin Lamu dropped out and returned to the Tibetan region to develop Tibetan medicine.

In 1999, Yangjin Lamu formed a Tibetan vocal group - the Yangjiema Triad with her sisters Daizang Zhuoma and Lamucuo. The Triad performed at China Central Television's Spring Festival Gala in 2000.

In 2002, Yangjin Lamu and Mark Yuting Chen 陳宇廷 got married in Beijing.

In 2010. Yangjin Lamu and Mark Yuting Chen 陳宇廷 joined the "Global Philanthropist Circle (GPC)". Afterwards, Yangjin Lamu, Peggy Dulany, Jennifer Buffett, Zainab Salbi, and other female charity leaders launched "Women for Humanity".

Since 2013, Yangjin Lamu and Mark Yuting Chen 陳宇廷 have been promoting "Science of Advanced Consciousness and Zen of Yangjinma".

Yangjin Lamu gave birth to her eldest daughter Mingle Chen at the age of 46. At 51, she was pregnant again and delivered triplets - Changle Chen, Yongle Chen and Mile Chen. Yangjin and Mark now have two sons and two daughters.

== Creation and spiritual music performances ==
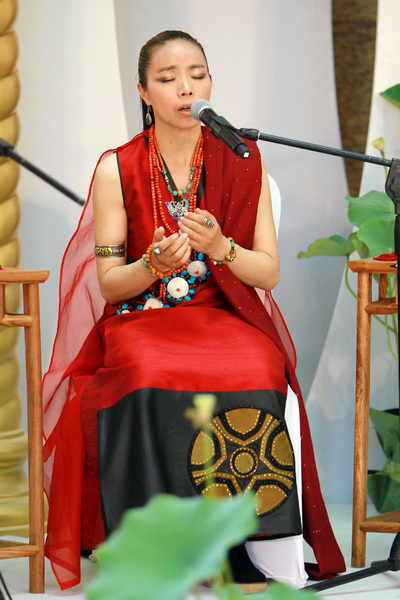
In July 2012, Yangjin Lamu held the "Perfection and Beauty" Concert.

Yangjin Lamu retired from the world of business after she got married and devoted herself to Buddhist practice and music.

She has produced and published four music albums, among which Dharma Flower was nominated for the Best Religious Music Album of the 19th Taiwan Golden Melody Awards.

In 2008, Yangjin Lamu was invited by Paul Winter to sing at the Summer Solstice Concert at St. John's Cathedral in New York, USA [14].

On February 13, 2011, Miho: Journey to the Mountain, the album that includes Yangjin's song Words of Wish Fulfillment, won the 53rd Grammy Award for Best New Age Album. As one of the contributors and the only vocalist in the album, Yangjin Lamu accepted the Grammy Award on behalf of Paul Winter Consort and became the first Chinese singer to win a Grammy Award.

In May 2011, Yangjin Lamu and Peter Buffett held the "Prayers for World Peace Concert" at Zhongshan Concert Hall in Beijing".

In June 2011, Yangijn Lamu performed her Grammy-winning song again at St. John's Cathedral in New York [12].

In May 2012, Yangjin Lamu and Paul Winter Consort performed in Shumei, Japan.

In July 2012, Yangjin Lamu held the Perfection and Beauty concert in Beijing.

In 2013, Yangjin Lamu, together with Grammy winners Steve Gorn, Eugene Friesen, Glen Velez, held A Night of Grammy Masters· Yangjin Lamu Spiritual Concert in Shanghai. Since then, Yangjin Lamu has also represented Tibetans in international performances in Russia, New York, Los Angeles, Colorado, New Mexico, Turkey, and dozens of large-scale TV shows and performances such as the Spring Festival Gala of China Central Television.

In June 2017, Yangjin Lamu, Dhruba Ghosh, and many other Grammy winners held the "Jue Zhao 2017-Yangjin Song and Dance Collection" Concert in Shanghai.

== Publications ==
=== Books ===
- Enlightened Female Warrior (Traditional Taiwanese Version). Fangzhi Publishing House, 2013.
- Age of Feminine Energy (Mainland Simplified Chinese Version). Tianjin People's Publishing House, 2014.
- Mother Zen: Nine Keys to Happy Mother's Awakening (Traditional Taiwanese version). Fangzhi Publishing House, 2019.

== Discography ==
=== Music albums ===
- Tears of Yangjinma. 2005
- Yangjin – the Tibetan Voice. Wind Music 2006.
- Dharma Flower Wind Music 2007
- Miho: Journey to the Mountain (The 53rd Grammy Awards "Best New Age Album", produced and published by the Paul Winter Consort in 2011, with Yangjin Lamu as the vocalist of the album)
- Heavenly Music (Opening Concert of 2009 Taipei Traditional Art Season). Taipei Chinese Orchestra. 2009
- Words of Wish Fulfillment 2014

== Awards ==
- Miho: Journey to the Mountain won the 53rd Grammy Award for Best New Age Album
- 2013 "National Spirit Builder" awarded by mainland Chinese magazine Life
- Dharma Flower was nominated for the Best Religious Music Album of the 19th Taiwan Golden Melody Awards in the Communication Art category
