= The Silent Holy Stones =

- Traditional Chinese: 靜靜的瑪呢石
- Simplified Chinese: 静静的嘛呢石
- Hanyu Pinyin: Jìngjìngdě Máníshí
- Directed by: Pema Tseden
- Written by: Pema Tseden
- Produced by: Pan Peicong; Li An
- Starring: Luosang Danpai; Living Buddha Juhuancang
- Cinematography: Sonthar Gyal; Du Jie
- Edited by: Li Fang; Zhou Yifu
- Music by: Dege Cairang
- Production company: Youth Film Studio of Beijing Film Academy
- Distributed by: Himalaya Audio & Visual Culture Communication Co, Ltd
- Release date: 1 June 2006
- Running time: 102 minutes
- Country: China
- Language: Tibetan

The Silent Holy Stones (Chinese: 静静的嘛呢石) is a 2006 Tibetan feature film written and directed by Pema Tseden. The Silent Holy Stones is about the tale of a young Lama who comes from a remote monastery is enthusiastic about life, eager to learn, and curious about everything. The film won the Best Directorial Debut at the 25th Golden Rooster Awards, Asian New Talent Award for Best Director at the 8th Changchun Film Festival, and Best First Feature at the 13th Beijing College Student Film Festival. The film was released on June 1, 2006, in China.

== Cast ==
- Luosang Danpai as the young Lama, a ten-year-old Tibetan boy.
- Living Buddha Juhuancang as himself.

== Production ==
This film was shot in Guwa Monastery, northwest China's Qinghai province.

== Accolades ==
Date	Award	Category	Result	Notes
2005	25th Golden Rooster Awards	Best Directorial Debut	Won	
2005	10th Busan International Film Festival	New Currents Award	Nominated	
2006	9th Shanghai International Film Festival	Asian New Talent Award for Best Director	Won	
2006	8th Changchun Film Festival	Best Director	Nominated	
2006	8th Changchun Film Festival	Special Jury Award	Won	
2006	13th Beijing College Student Film Festival	Best First Feature	Won	
2007	7th Chinese Film Media Award	Best New Director	Nominated	
