= To Get to Heaven, First You Have to Die =

- Directed by: Jamshed Usmonov
- Written by: Jamshed Usmonov
- Produced by: Denis Carot
- Starring: Khurshed Golibekov
- Cinematography: Pascal Lagriffoul
- Edited by: Jacques Comets
- Music by: Pierre Aviat
- Distributed by: Elzévir Films, Rézo Films
- Release date: 4 October 2006
- Running time: 95 minutes
- Country: Tajikistan
- Languages: Tajik, Russian

To Get to Heaven, First You Have to Die (Russian: Чтобы Добраться до Небес Сначала, Вы должны Умереть; Tajik: Биҳишт фақат барои мурдагон, Bihisht faqat baroi murdagon; Persian: بهشت فقط برای مردگان) is a 2006 Tajik film directed by Jamshed Usmonov.

== Plot ==
Kamal, a young man, is trapped into a loveless marriage in a rural village. He moves to a big city to seek his fortune and falls in love with Vera, a beautiful woman who, alas, is married. However, having got involved with organised crime, he finds that her husband is one of the mafiosi for whom he works. He uses this to his advantage, seeing Vera more and more often.

== Cast ==
- Khurshed Golibekov: Kamal
- Dinara Drukarova: Vera
- Maraf Pulodzoda: Vera's husband

== Release ==
The film débuted at the 2006 Cannes Film Festival on 23 May. It was released properly in France on 4 October of the same year, as well as being released in Poland, Estonia, Serbia, Mexico, Argentina and Hong Kong.

== International titles ==
- Original Tajik: Bihisht faqat baroi murdagon – Биҳишт фақат барои мурдагон
- English: To Get to Heaven, First You Have to Die
- German: Um in den Himmel zu kommen muss man zuerst sterben
- French: Pour aller au ciel, il faut mourir
- Spanish: Para llegar al cielo primero hay que morir
