= Sonthar Gyal =

Tibetan film director

- Born: 1974 (age 51–52); Tongde County, Qinghai, China
- Education: Qinghai Normal University; Beijing Film Academy
- Occupations: filmmaker, cinematographer
- Years active: 2004–present

Chinese name
- Chinese: 松太加
Transcriptions
Standard Mandarin
- Hanyu Pinyin: Sōng tài jiā

Tibetan name
- Tibetan: ཟོན་ཐར་རྒྱལ།
Transcriptions
- Wylie: Zon thar rgyal

Sonthar Gyal (born 1974) is a Tibetan film director in People's Republic of China. His films include The Sun Beaten Path (2011) and River (2015).

== Biography ==
Sonthar Gyal was born in Tongde County, Hainan Tibetan Autonomous Prefecture, Qinghai. His father was a primary school teacher who was the first person to graduate from college in the region. Sonthar Gyal studied at the Tsolho Nationalities Teacher Training College in Hainan (Tsolho) Prefecture and taught in the nomadic community for four years. Afterwards he received a scholarship to study fine arts at the Qinghai Normal University in Xining. After graduating in 2003 with a B.A. in Fine Arts, he worked as an art teacher and a curator at the Tongde Cultural Museum.

Although he grew up on the grassland with very few opportunities to watch films (and the ones he watched were in Chinese) he became so fascinated by films that he began to collect scraps of films after each open-air showing. Later, encouraged by his friend Pema Tseden who also hails from Hainan Prefecture, Sonthar Gyal followed him to the prestigious Beijing Film Academy, where he studied cinematography for 2 years with the support of Trace Foundation. Upon graduation, he worked as a cinematographer and artistic director for a series of films and documentaries, many directed by Pema Tseden. He made his directorial debut in 2011 with The Sun Beaten Path.

== Filmography ==
Year	English title	Tibetan title	Notes
2005	The Silent Holy Stones	ལྷིང་འཇགས་ཀྱི་མ་ཎི་རྡོ་འབུམ།	cinematographer, artistic director
2009	The Search	འཚོལ།	cinematographer, artistic director
2011	Old Dog	ཁྱི་རྒན།	cinematographer, artistic director
2011	The Sun Beaten Path	དབུས་ལམ་གྱི་ཉི་མ།	director, screenwriter
2015	River	གཙང་པོ།	director, screenwriter
2018	Ala Changso		director, screenwriter, producer

== Awards and nominations ==
Year	#	Award	Category	Work	Result
2011	5th	Asia Pacific Screen Award	Achievement in Cinematography	Old Dog	Nominated
2011		Vancouver International Film Festival	Dragons & Tigers Award for Young Cinema	The Sun Beaten Path	Won
2011		Locarno Festival	Golden Leopard: Filmmakers of the Present	The Sun Beaten Path	Nominated
2011		Hong Kong International Film Festival	Golden DV Award	The Sun Beaten Path	Nominated
2011		Hong Kong International Film Festival	FIPRESCI Prize	The Sun Beaten Path	Nominated
2011		Cinemanila International Film Festival	Lino Brocka Award	The Sun Beaten Path	Nominated
2012		Deauville Asian Film Festival	Lotus: Best Film	The Sun Beaten Path	Nominated
2015		Berlin International Film Festival	Crystal Bear, Generation Kplus: Best Film	River	Nominated
2018		Shanghai International Film Festival	Golden Goblet: Grand Jury Prize	Ala Changso	Won
2018		Shanghai International Film Festival	Golden Goblet: Best Screenplay	Ala Changso	Won
