= Xu Haofeng =

Chinese association football player

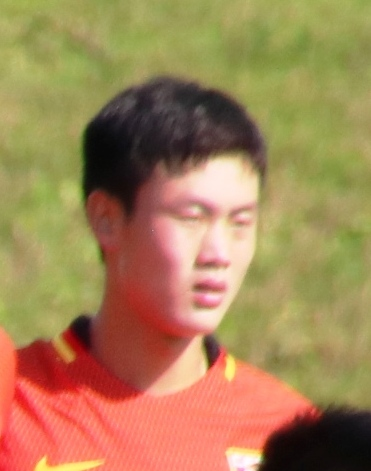

Personal information
- Date of birth: 27 January 1999 (age 27)
- Place of birth: Chengdu, Sichuan, China
- Height: 1.82 m (6 ft 0 in)
- Position: Right-back

Team information
- Current team: Wuhan Three Towns (on loan from Henan FC)
- Number: 4

Youth career
- 2018–2019: Tianjin Tianhai

Senior career*
Years	Team	Apps	(Gls)
2020–2023	Shenzhen FC	58	(1)
2024–	Henan FC	20	(0)
2025	→ Changchun Yatai (loan)	22	(0)
2026–	→ Wuhan Three Towns (loan)	14	(0)

International career^{‡}
2018	China U19	5	(0)
2022	China U23	1	(0)
2022–	China	4	(0)
Medal record
Representing China
Men's football
EAFF Championship
Bronze medal – third place	2022 Japan	Team
- * Club domestic league appearances and goals as of 22 November 2026 ‡ National team caps and goals as of 27 July 2022

Xu Haofeng (Chinese: 徐浩峰; born 27 January 1999) is a Chinese professional footballer who plays as a right-back for Chinese Super League club Wuhan Three Towns, on loan from Henan FC and the China national team.

== Club career ==
=== Shenzhen FC ===
In July 2020, Xu was one of eight former Tianjin Tianhai players to sign with Chinese Super League club Shenzhen F.C. He would go on to make his senior debut on 26 July 2020 in a 3–0 win against Guangzhou R&F in the opening game of the 2020 Chinese Super League season. On 21 July 2023, Xu scored his first Chinese Super League goal in a 3–3 away draw at Tianjin Jinmen Tiger.

=== Henan FC ===
On 9 February 2024, Xu joined fellow Chinese Super League club Henan FC following the relegation and subsequent dissolution of Shenzhen FC

On 28 January 2025, Xu was loaned out to Changchun Yatai for 2025 Chinese Super League season.

On 19 June 2026, Xu was loaned out to Chinese Super League club Wuhan Three Towns for the rest of 2026 season.

== International career ==
On 20 July 2022, Xu made his international debut for China in a 3–0 defeat against South Korea in the 2022 EAFF E-1 Football Championship, as the Chinese FA decided to field the U-23 national team for this senior competition.

On 12 December 2023, Xu was named in China's squad for the 2023 AFC Asian Cup in Qatar.

== Career statistics ==
As of 23 May 2026

Club	Season	League			Cup		Continental		Other		Total	
Club	Season	Division	Apps	Goals	Apps	Goals	Apps	Goals	Apps	Goals	Apps	Goals
Shenzhen FC	2020	Chinese Super League	12	0	0	0	–		–		12	0
Shenzhen FC	2021	Chinese Super League	8	0	1	1	–		–		9	1
Shenzhen FC	2022	Chinese Super League	14	0	1	0	–		–		15	0
Shenzhen FC	2023	Chinese Super League	24	1	1	0	–		–		25	1
Shenzhen FC	Total		58	1	3	1	0	0	0	0	61	2
Henan FC	2024	Chinese Super League	15	0	0	0	–		–		15	0
Henan FC	2026	Chinese Super League	5	0	0	0	–		–		5	0
Henan FC	Total		20	0	0	0	0	0	0	0	20	0
Changchun Yatai (loan)	2025	Chinese Super League	22	0	1	0	–		–		23	0
Career total			100	1	4	1	0	0	0	0	104	2
