= Steven Lippman =

American photographer

- Born: Steven Lippman; 1964 (age 61–62); United States
- Known for: Photography

Steven Lippman is a former competitive surfer and skateboarder turned commercial photographer and director who has been called "one of the most explosive and diverse photographers around today." Specializing in lifestyle, fashion, and beach/rock & roll culture, he has shot advertising campaigns for clients such as Harley-Davidson, Patrón, Paul Mitchell, Sony, Coors Light, Verizon, James Perse, and Billabong.

Since first exploring filmmaking in 1995, Lippman has directed many commercials and groundbreaking viral videos. In 2011, he directed a nearly-seven-minute-long viral video for JVC Mobile Entertainment's "TURN ME ON 4: Decades" that featured Lita Ford (an original member of the Runaways), Puddle of Mudd, Candlebox, and Rev Theory that was broadcast on the JVC billboard in Times Square and online.

In addition to commercial lifestyle photography, Lippman also photographs celebrities. Over the years, he has made portraits of Ryan Reynolds, Jeremy Piven, Pierce Brosnan, Jared Leto, Taylor Kitsch, and Jordana Brewster, among many others, and photographed musical acts such as the All American Rejects, Ben Harper, and Incubus.

An avid environmentalist, Lippman is the director of the Blue Project, which works to protect the Earth's oceans by teaming with other marine-oriented charitable organizations. In 2010, Ron Herman's men's store in Malibu, California, hosted an exhibition of Lippman's work, titled "Waves," to raise money for Save the Waves. The event featured eight signature images that Lippman crafted using photos from his archives along with treatments consisting of metal, wood, plants, and melted Polaroids. He also collaborated with Herman on a limited-edition clothing line that was sold at the event, also benefiting Save the Waves.

Lippman, who in 2010 was honored by SurfAid International, a nonprofit humanitarian organization whose aim is to improve the health, well-being, and self-reliance of people living in isolated communities, also he volunteers his time to Surfers Healing, which provides autistic children with the opportunity to experience the thrill of surfing.

Lippman lives with his wife and two children in Malibu. He is represented by Stockland Martel.
