= The Search (2009 film) =

The Search Soul Searching
- Traditional Chinese: 尋找智美更登
- Simplified Chinese: 寻找智美更登
- Hanyu Pinyin: Xénzhǎo Zhìmeĭ Gēngdēng
- Directed by: Pema Tseden
- Written by: Pema Tseden
- Produced by: Sangye Gyantso; Pema Tseden
- Starring: Zong Zhi; Manla Jiepu; Dobe Dorje; Drolma Gyab; Lumo Tso
- Cinematography: Sonthar Gyal
- Edited by: Hai-ling Chen; Benjamin Illos; Xing Zhou
- Music by: Dege Cairang
- Production companies: Himalaya Audio & Visual Culture Communication
- Release date: 11 August 2009 (Locarno International Film Festival)
- Running time: 112 minutes
- Country: China
- Language: Tibetan

The Search or Soul Searching (Chinese: 寻找智美更登) is a 2009 Tibetan romance film written and directed by Pema Tseden. The Search is the first-ever film made in Western China's Tibet Autonomous Region to have been shot entirely with a Tibetan crew and in the Tibetan language. The film picks up the story of a photographer and a director travels from village to village looking for actors to star in a film based on the Tibetan opera Drimé Kunden, a legendary account of a prince who selflessly gives away his children and his own eyes to those in need. The film premiered at Locarno International Film Festival on August 11, 2009. The Search won Special Jury Award at the 12th Shanghai International Film Festival and was nominated for Golden Goblet.

== Plot ==
A boss leads a director and a photographer to Tibet to look for an actor to star in a film based on the Tibetan opera Drimé Kunden, a legendary account of a prince who selflessly gives away his children and his own eyes to those in need. In order to find a suitable actor, they visits many Tibetan villages, towns and Townships, and monasteries. In a Tibetan village, director chose a girl who played Drimé Kunden's concubine, but the girl has covered her face, and she doesn't want anyone to see her face. The girl asks to follow them to find her former boyfriend, the director answers her request. Along the way, the boss tells the story of his first love. At last, the girl leaves her former boyfriend. The film crew continues to search for a suitable actor.

== Cast ==
- Zong Zhi
- Manla Jiepu
- Dobe Dorje
- Drolma Gyab
- Lumo Tso

== Production ==
This film was shot in Qinghai-Tibet Plateau.

== Accolades ==
Date	Award	Category	Result	Notes
2009	12th Shanghai International Film Festival	Golden Goblet	Soul Searching	Nominated
2009	12th Shanghai International Film Festival	Special Jury Award	Soul Searching	Won
2009	7th Bangkok International Film Festival	Grand Jury Prize	Soul Searching	Won
2009	62nd Locarno International Film Festival	Best Film	Soul Searching	Nominated
2009	25th Warsaw International Film Festival	Best Film	Soul Searching	Nominated
2009	3rd Seoul Digital Film Festival	Best Film	Soul Searching	Nominated
2009	53rd London International Film Festival	Best Film	Soul Searching	Nominated
2009	Nantes Three Continents Film Festival	Best Film	Soul Searching	Nominated
2009	16th Beijing University Film Festival	Best Film	Soul Searching	Nominated
