= Old Dog =

- Film poster
- Traditional Chinese: 老狗
- Simplified Chinese: 老狗
- Hanyu Pinyin: Lǎogǒu
- Directed by: Pema Tseden
- Written by: Pema Tseden
- Produced by: Zhang Xianmin
- Starring: Yanbum Gyal; Drolma Kyab; Lochey Lochey; Tamdrin Tso
- Cinematography: Sonthar Gyal
- Edited by: Sangye Bhum
- Production companies: Himalaya Audio & Visual Culture Communication Co, Ltd
- Release date: 27 March 2011 (Hong Kong)
- Running time: 93 minutes
- Country: China
- Language: Tibetan

Old Dog (Chinese: 老狗) is a 2011 Tibetan feature film written and directed by Pema Tseden, and starring Yanbum Gyal, Drolma Kyab, Lochey Lochey, Tamdrin Tso. Old Dog picks up the story of a father and son against the backdrop of China's escalating trade in Tibetan mastiffs. The film won Best Narrative Feature at the 2012 Brooklyn Film Festival and Best Picture at the 12th Tokyo Future International Film Festival. The film premiered at the 2011 Hong Kong International Film Festival, and was released in China in 2011.

== Plot ==
In the late 1990s, somewhere in China's Tibet Autonomous Region, a motorcycle-riding Tibetan named Gonpo sells his father's prized Tibetan mastiff to a dog dealer without his father's permission. Mastiffs are in demand by Chinese businessmen, and they are becoming rare. When his father finds out, he immediately goes to the dog dealer to return the money and retrieve his dog. At first, the dealer refuses but eventually agrees when police officer Dorje (who happens to be the old man's son-in-law) explains the nature of the family conflict. The old man states that the dog has been a good animal in herding the family's sheep. Since the dog has been in his care for 13 years, he wants to ensure a good life for the animal.

After recovering his mastiff, the old sheep herder joins Dorje for a tea and meat snack at a local eatery. Eventually the topic of conversation evolves around the police officer's young son who just turned 3. At that point, the old man states that the sooner one has children, the sooner one is happy, and there is nothing else like it. He then asks Dorje for advice about Gonpo, his hooligan son who tried to sell the dog. Gonpo and his wife Rikso have been together for 3 years without having children. Concerned, the old man asks where in the city can Gonpo and Rikso get help for this, and Dorje suggests they go to the city hospital.

With some hesitation in obeying his father, Gonpo agrees to go to the hospital with Rikso but upon arriving, he changes his mind in accompanying Rikso and asks her to get her sister instead. After the appointment, Gonpo is informed that there is no problem in Rikso that prevents her from having children. There is a meaningful pause as Gonpo quietly absorbs this news.

In the middle of the night, a scuffle is heard around the house, and noises indicate an attempted theft of the mastiff. Thinking of what is best for the animal, the old man decides to release him to the mountains in the hope that he can live the rest of his life in freedom. Unfortunately, the old dog is captured by the same dealer from before, and news of this reaches the old man to his chagrin. The surprise comes when the old man learns that Gonpo is in jail for going to the dealer and punching him out in order to retrieve the dog. Dorje eventually returns the dog to his owner.

At the jail, the old man visits with Gonpo and shares a cigarette with him. The two men share a quiet moment during which time Gonpo reveals that Rikso had gone to the hospital and was determined to have no problems in conceiving children. Tenderly, the old man offers to bring Gonpo a beer (secretly) while he serves his time in jail.

While tending his sheep with his faithful mastiff and gazing upon a scenic landscape of Tibetan mountains and tundra, the old man is badgered by 2 men who offer to buy the dog. Exasperated, the old man repeats several times that he is not interested in selling, and eventually the men leave him alone. In the final poignant scenes, the old man decides to end his dog's life by strangling him on his chain, and in minutes his mastiff is dead. Slowly and with a heaviness in his step, the old man walks away (from the camera).

== Cast ==
- Yanbum Gyal
- Drolma Kyab
- Lochey Lochey
- Tamdrin Tso

== Accolades ==
Date	Award	Category	Recipient(s) and nominee(s)	Result	Notes
2011	12th Tokyo Future International Film Festival	Best Picture	Old Dog	Won	
2012	Brooklyn Film Festival	Best Narrative Feature	Old Dog	Won	
