= Local Chronicles Publishing House =

Chinese state publisher

Local Chronicles Publishing House (Chinese: 方志出版社), also known as Fangzhi Publishing House and Local Chronicles Press, is a state publisher in Beijing, China, that specializes in local gazetteers. It was founded in May 1995 and is overseen by the Chinese Academy of Social Sciences.
