= Pema Tseden =

Tibetan film director and screenwriter (1969–2023)

- པད་མ་ཚེ་བརྟན།
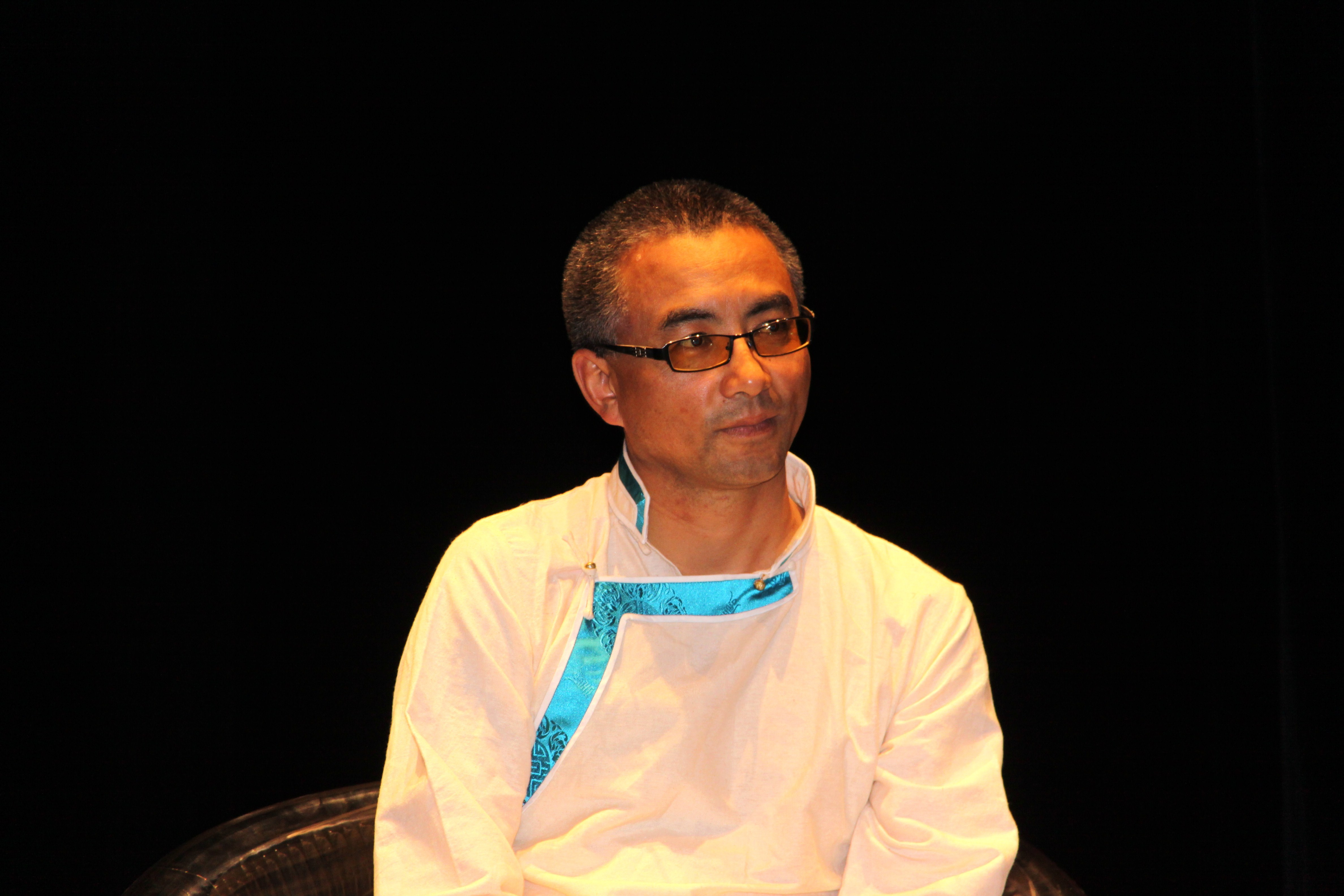
- Tseden in 2012
- Born: December 1969; Guide County, Qinghai, China
- Died: 8 May 2023 (aged 53); Lhasa, Tibet Autonomous Region, China
- Education: Northwest University for Nationalities; Beijing Film Academy
- Occupations: Director, screenwriter
- Years active: 1991–2023
- Organization(s): China Film Directors' Guild; China Film Association; Chinese Film Literature Association
- Notable work: The Silent Holy Stones; Tharlo

Pema Tseden (Tibetan: པད་མ་ཚེ་བརྟན།, Wylie: pad ma tshe brtan), also called Wanma Caidan (simplified Chinese: 万玛才旦; traditional Chinese: 萬瑪才旦; pinyin: Wàn mǎ cái dàn; December 1969 – 8 May 2023) was a Tibetan film director and screenwriter. He was a professor at the China Academy of Art in Hangzhou and a member of the Film Directors Guild of China, China Film Association, and Chinese Film Literature Association. He is known for making many films entirely in Tibetan language and presenting a more realistic depiction of Tibetan life as opposed to the exoticism often associated with the region.

== Biography ==
=== Early life and education ===
Pema Tseden was born into a pastoral family, in Guide County, Qinghai, in December 1969, during the Cultural Revolution. He was raised by his grandfather, a monk, who also paid for Pema Tseden's education. In an interview he mentioned that his grandfather believed him to be the reincarnation of his uncle, who was a person of knowledge. He was the only one of three siblings to have finished school. He graduated from Northwest University for Nationalities, where he majored in Tibetan Language and Literature. After graduation, he worked as a primary school teacher and a civil servant. Then he pursued advanced studies at China's most prestigious film school, Beijing Film Academy, where he became the Academy's first-ever Tibetan student.

=== Career ===
Pema Tseden's debut work, The Silent Holy Stones, won the Best Directorial Debut at the 25th Golden Rooster Awards, Asian New Talent Award for Best Director at the 9th Shanghai International Film Festival, Special Jury Award at the 8th Changchun Film Festival, and Best First Feature at the 13th Beijing College Student Film Festival.

In 2009, Soul Searching won the Special Jury Award at the 12th Shanghai International Film Festival and was nominated for Golden Goblet Award.

Tharlo, a film adaptation based on the novel of the same name by himself, won the Best Adapted Screenplay at the 52nd Golden Horse Film Festival and Awards, also prizes in the 23rd Beijing College Student Film Festival, and the film was nominated for Golden Lion at the 72nd Venice International Film Festival.

In June 2016, Pema Tseden was detained by police after attempting to re-enter the baggage claim area at Xining airport to retrieve one of his luggage. The police said he refused to cooperate and suffered three cuts where the handcuff dug into his skin. His colleagues reported that during the scuffle, he was grabbed by the hair and suffered many bruises, after which he was interrogated all night. On Saturday, he was ordered to serve administrative detention but was hospitalized the following Monday after experiencing headaches, chest pains, and high blood sugar. Wang Lei, media director for Tharlo, said Pema Tseden had diabetes and was not able to medicate normally during detention. The Film Directors Guild of China issued a statement calling for an investigation into whether the police had used excessive force.

Pema Tseden was the first filmmaker in greater China to make films entirely in Tibetan language. He was known for his realistic portrayal of modern Tibetans, compared to the more mystical depictions often associated with the region.

Filmmakers are starting to more accurately capture the essence of life in Tibet. They are starting to let go of the old stereotypes.

— Pema Tseden, The New York Times

=== Death ===
Pema Tseden died from heart failure in Lhasa on 8 May 2023, at the age of 53. He was about to finish the ninth film that would have been both written and directed by himself. He had a son.

== Filmography ==
=== Film ===
Year	English title	Tibetan title	Chinese title	Director
2002	The Silent Holy Stones	ལྷང་འཇགས་ཀྱི་མ་ཎི་རྡོ་འབུམ།	静静的嘛呢石	Director
2004	The Grassland	རྩྭ་ཐང་།	草原	Director
2004	The Weatherman's Legacy		最后的防雹师	Director
2005	The Last Hail Suppresso		末代防雹师	Director
2007	Soul Searching (or The Search)	འཚོལ།	寻找智美更登	Director
2007			嘎陀大法会	Director
2007			桑耶寺	Director
2011	Old Dog	ཁྱི་རྒན།	老狗	Director
2009	Flares Wafting in 1983		喇叭裤飘荡在1983	Director
2014	The Sacred Arrow	གཡང་མདའ།	五彩神箭	Director
2015	Tharlo	ཐར་ལོ།	塔洛	Director
2017	My Little Lama	ངའི་བཙུན་ཆུང་།།	我的小喇嘛	Director
2018	Jinpa	ལག་དམར།	撞死了一只羊	Director
2019	Balloon	དབུགས་ལྒང་།	气球	Director
2020	Cordyceps		冬虫夏草	Director
2020	Singer	གླུ་པ།		Screen writer
2022	Eternal Day		永恒的一天	Director
2022	Strangers			Director
2023	Seventeen Mile		十七英里	Director
2023	Snow Leopard	གངས་གཟིག	雪豹	Director
2024	Have a nice trip	འགྲུལ་ལམ་བདེ་མོ།	祝你旅途愉快	Director

== Bibliography ==
- Enticement: Stories of Tibet, translated by Patricia Schiaffini-Vedani and Michael Monhart, Albany, NY: State University of New York Press ISBN 9781438474267

== Awards ==
Year	Award	Category	Work	Result	Notes
2005	25th Golden Rooster Awards	Best Directorial Debut	The Silent Holy Stones	Won	
2005	10th Busan International Film Festival	New Currents Award	The Silent Holy Stones	Nominated	
2006	9th Shanghai International Film Festival	Asian New Talent Award for Best Director	The Silent Holy Stones	Won	
2006	8th Changchun Film Festival	Best Director	The Silent Holy Stones	Nominated	
2006	8th Changchun Film Festival	Special Jury Award	The Silent Holy Stones	Won	
2006	13th Beijing College Student Film Festival	Best First Feature	The Silent Holy Stones	Won	
2007	7th Chinese Film Media Award	Best New Director	The Silent Holy Stones	Nominated	
2009	12th Shanghai International Film Festival	Golden Goblet	Soul Searching	Nominated	
2009	12th Shanghai International Film Festival	Special Jury Award	Soul Searching	Won	
2009	7th Bangkok International Film Festival	Grand Jury Prize	Soul Searching	Won	
2009	62nd Locarno International Film Festival	Best Film	Soul Searching	Nominated	
2009	25th Warsaw International Film Festival	Best Film	Soul Searching	Nominated	
2009	3rd Seoul Digital Film Festival	Best Film	Soul Searching	Nominated	
2009	53rd London International Film Festival	Best Film	Soul Searching	Nominated	
2009	Nantes Three Continents Film Festival	Best Film	Soul Searching	Nominated	
2009	16th Beijing University Film Festival	Best Film	Soul Searching	Nominated	
2011	12th Tokyo Future International Film Festival	Best Picture	Old Dog	Won	
2012	Brooklyn Film Festival	Best Native Feature	Old Dog	Won	
2014	17th Shanghai International Film Festival	Golden Goblet	The Sacred Arrow	Nominated	
2015	Chinese Film Directors Association	Screenwriter of the Year	The Sacred Arrow	Nominated	
2015	72nd Venice International Film Festival	Golden Lion	Tharlo	Nominated	
2015	52nd Golden Horse Film Festival and Awards	Best Director	Tharlo	Nominated	
2015	52nd Golden Horse Film Festival and Awards	Best Adapted Screenplay	Tharlo	Won	
2015	52nd Golden Horse Film Festival and Awards	Best Feature Film	Tharlo	Nominated	
2016	23rd Beijing College Student Film Festival	Artistic Exploration Award	Tharlo	Won	
2016	23rd Beijing College Student Film Festival	Best Picture	Tharlo	Nominated	
2016	23rd Beijing College Student Film Festival	Best Director	Tharlo	Nominated	
2016	22nd Visul Asia International Film Festival	Golden Tricycle Award	Tharlo	Won	
2016	22nd Visul Asia International Film Festival	Paris Oriental Language Award	Tharlo	Won	
2016	16th Tokyo Filmex	Best Film	Tharlo	Won	
2016	16th Tokyo Filmex	Student Jury Award	Tharlo	Won	
2016	12th China Independent Film Exhibition	Best Film of the Year	Tharlo	Won	
2016	17th Chinese Film Media Awards	Best Film	Tharlo	Nominated	
2016	17th Chinese Film Media Awards	Best Director	Tharlo	Nominated	
2016	17th Chinese Film Media Awards	Best Screenplay	Tharlo	Nominated	
2017	31st Golden Rooster Awards	Best Low-budget Feature	Tharlo	Won	
2018	75th Venice International Film Festival	Best Screenplay	Jinpa	Won	
2018	55th Golden Horse Awards	Best Director	Jinpa	Nominated	
2018	55th Golden Horse Awards	Best	Jinpa	Nominated	
2018	3rd Lizhi International Film Festival	Best Film	Jinpa	Won	
2019	76th Venice International Film Festival		Balloon	Nominated	
2019	2019 Toronto International Film Festival	Contemporary World Cinema	Balloon	Nominated	
2019	24th Busan International Film Festival	A Window on Asian Cinema	Balloon	Nominated	
2019	20th Tokyo Filmex		Balloon	Won	
2019	Asia-Pacific Film Festival	Best Film	Balloon	Nominated	
2019	5th Chicago International Film Festival	Best Screenplay	Balloon	Won	
2019	2nd Hainan Island International Film Festival	Best Film	Balloon	Won	
