= Jamshed Usmonov =

Tajikistani film director (born 1965)

- Born: 13 January 1965 (age 60); Asht, Tajikistan
- Occupations: Film director, screenwriter, producer
- Years active: 1998–present

Jamshed Usmonov (Tajik: Ҷамшед Усмонов, Persian: جمشید عثمانف; born 13 January 1965), also credited as Djamshed Usmonov, is a Tajik film director, producer, scriptwriter and one of the most notable figures of contemporary Persian cinema.

He studied at the Dushanbe Fine Arts School in Dushanbe and Director's School in Moscow. His film To Get to Heaven, First You Have to Die, was screened in the Un Certain Regard section at the 2006 Cannes Film Festival.

== Filmography ==
- 1998: Flight of the Bee
- 2002: Angel on the Right
- 2006: To Get to Heaven, First You Have to Die (Tajik: Bihisht faqat baroi murdagon)
- 2011: My Wife's Romance

== Awards and honors ==
The Flight of the Bee

Torino Film Festival 1998 : Grand Prix, Audience Award, Fipresci Prize

Thessaloniki Film Festival 1998 : Silver Alexander.

Cottbus Film Festival 1999: Don Quijote Award

Angel on the Right

Official Selection Cannes Film Festival 2002, “Un Certain Regard”

Special Jury Prize Angers 2003,

Special Jury Prize Tokyo Filmex 2003,

Grand Prix Tromso 2003,

Grand Prix Barcelona Asian Film Festival,

FIPRESCI Prize at the 2002 London Film Festival.

To Get to Heaven, First You Have to Die

Official Selection Cannes Film Festival 2006, “Un Certain Regard”

Grand Prix Tokyo Filmex 2006

== See also ==
- Iranian cinema
- Tajikistan
