= The Tag-Along: The Devil Fish =

- Film poster
- Chinese: 人面魚: 紅衣小女孩外傳
- Hanyu Pinyin: rén mìan yú: hóng yī xǐao nǔhái wàizhùan
- Directed by: David Chuang
- Written by: Chien Shih-keng; Hsu Ling-Fang
- Produced by: Chen Shin-chi; Hank Tseng; Jacky Chen; Hao Po-hsiang; Phil Tang; Jade Tsai; Dennis Wu
- Starring: Vivian Hsu; Cheng Jen-shuo
- Cinematography: Chen Chi-wen
- Edited by: Shieh Meng-ju
- Music by: Rockid Lee
- Production companies: Ambassador Theatres; CMC Entertainment Holding Corporation; Damou Entertainment; HIM International Music; Lots Home Entertainment; Once Upon A Story Company; Showtime International; Sky Films Entertainment
- Distributed by: Vie Vision Pictures (Taiwan); ABS-CBN Film Productions (Philippines); Access-A (Japan); China Lion Film Distribution (Canada/USA); Clover Films (Singapore); Golden Screen Cinemas (Malaysia); Golden Village Pictures (Singapore); BayView Entertainment (USA)
- Release dates: 12 November 2018 (55th Golden Horse Awards); 23 November 2018 (Taiwan)
- Running time: 114 minutes
- Country: Taiwan
- Languages: Mandarin; Taiwanese
- Box office: NT$73,070,000

The Tag-Along: The Devil Fish (Mandarin: 人面魚: 紅衣小女孩外傳) is a 2018 Taiwanese horror film directed by David Chuang. It is a prequel to The Tag-Along (2015) and The Tag-Along 2 (2017). The film stars Vivian Hsu, Cheng Jen-shuo. The film had its world premiere at the 55th Golden Horse Film Festival and Awards. It was released on 3 2November 2018.

== Plot ==
The movie is based on another famous Taiwanese urban legend, a ghost story that involved three men catching and grilling a fish in central Taiwan only to notice a face appear as they began to eat it. They then heard a voice ask them, in Taiwanese, 「魚肉好吃嗎？」 ("Is the fish meat tasty?").

The story of 人面魚 (fish with a person's face) is a well known folktale in Taiwan. Tales of a fish-like creature with a human face, similar in a way to Japanese yokai, has existed in Taiwan for decades. The film introduces the same folktale of the three men catching the fish and hearing the famous sentence at the start, then the plot then follows the efforts of a group of people, involving a temple priest, a young boy and the boy's mother as they are harassed by malicious spirits brought on by the caught fish.

After completing the Tag Along story, the creators of the film wanted to make a movie about another Taiwanese folk tale, choosing the Devil Fish, potentially starting a series in which they could cover more Taiwanese urban legends in the future. The film is also set before the events of 紅衣小女孩2 (The Tag Along 2), including the young son of the Tiger Temple priest and his grandfather who both appear in The Tag Along 2 working at the Tiger Temple, with the son being the boyfriend of a missing girl in the story.

The plot of prequel explores Lin Chun-Kai past and the origin of the demon that possessed Mei-Hua's daughter that made her the girl in red in the first place. It is turned out that the demon is born from the vengeful spirit of a disfigured son of a wealthy man, Mr Chung. Mr Chong's son was born with a rare skin disease that gives him the skin that looked like the scale of a fish. Mr Chung heavily abuses his son due to his disfigurement and accumulating in him, killing his son. His son's vengeful spirit is then harnessed by a malevolent demon to wreak havoc on the people. Lin Chun-Kai's father, a master shaman successfully fights off the demon with the help of the Tiger Lord's spirit but at the cost of his life. In the end, Lin Chun-Kai is adopted by grandfather who is also the master shaman and trains him to be his father's successor, leading to the event of Tag-Along 2.

== Cast ==
=== Main-starring ===
- Vivian Hsu as Huang Ya-Hui
- Cheng Jen-shuo as Lin Chi-Cheng
- Wu Zhi-xuan as Chia-Hao (Juvenile)
- Joe Chang as Chung
- Francesca Kao as Lin Mei-Hua
- Lung Shao-hua as Aron
- Tsai Wu-hsiung as Hung Wen-Hsiung
- Wu Hung-hsiu as Hei-Gou
- Kuan Ming-tso as Fatty
- Chen Shao-Hui as Lin Chun-Kai
- Belle Hsin as Mei Ling
- Chou Ming-yu as Chia-Hao's father
- Hsu Li-Yun as old grandma
- Wang Hsin-Jue as Ah-Di
- Mitsue Kagota as Chia-Hao's Father's girlfriend

=== Guest-starring ===
- Rainie Yang
- Hsu Wei-ning
- River Huang
- Ruby Chan

== See also ==
- Mo-sin-a
