= Get the Hell Out =

2020 Taiwanese film by Wang I-fan

- Theatrical release poster
- Directed by: Wang I-fan
- Written by: Wang I-fan; Chien Shih-keng; Yang Wan-ju
- Produced by: Hank Tseng
- Starring: Megan Lai; Bruce Hung; Wang Chung-huang; Tuo Tsung-hua; Francesca Kao; Da-her Lin
- Cinematography: Seven Tsai
- Edited by: Shih Po-han
- Music by: Jimmy Lin
- Production company: Greener Grass Production
- Distributed by: Sky Films Entertainment
- Release dates: 28 June 2020 (TFF); 14 August 2020 (Taiwan)
- Running time: 96 minutes
- Country: Taiwan
- Language: Mandarin

Get the Hell Out (Chinese: 逃出立法院) is a 2020 Taiwanese horror comedy film directed by Wang I-fan in his feature debut, co-written with Chien Shih-keng. Starring Megan Lai, Bruce Hung, Wang Chung-huang, Tuo Tsung-hua, Francesca Kao, and Da-her Lin, the film unfolds in the Legislative Yuan, the national assembly of Taiwan, where a zombie apocalypse disrupts a conference, as a former legislator (Lai) manipulates a security guard (Hung) to halt a bill for a chemical plant that caused the virus outbreak.

Conceived by screenwriter Chien Shih-keng and producer Hank Tseng after The Tag-Along (2015), the screenplay began development when director-screenwriter Wang I-Fan joined the project in 2018, marking Taiwan's second zombie film after Zombie 108 (2012). Principal photography took place in the summer of 2019, primarily at the former Kaohsiung City Council Hall in Cianjin.

The film had its world premiere at the 22nd Taipei Film Festival on 28 June 2020, followed by a theatrical release in Taiwan on 14 August. It received mixed reviews from critics, who praised its creativity and political satire, but the writing, characters, action, and unclear themes were subject to criticism. The film received two nominations in the 57th Golden Horse Awards, winning for Best Action Choreography.

== Plot ==
Hsiung, a newly elected legislator who campaigns to reject a bill for a chemical plant in her hometown that could potentially spread rabies to humans, is provoked by journalists from the pro-construction faction and attempts to punch a photographer. She is held back by security guard Wang, who is secretly in love with her and has deliberately chosen to work at the congress to be close to her. In her anger, Hsiung suplexes him. Li, the leader of the pro-construction legislators, uses this incident to publicly condemn Hsiung, leading to her forced resignation. Blaming Wang for her loss, Hsiung pressures him to run for office in her stead and reclaim her seat. Wang's popularity surges online, where he is hailed as a national hero for standing up against incompetent legislators and he successfully wins the election. However, he later announces his support for the construction bill at a press conference, planning to infiltrate Li's faction and sabotage their efforts to pass the bill.

On the day the president is scheduled to be questioned by legislators in the Legislative Yuan, Hsiung encounters her father, a handyman who intends to assassinate the president, outside the building, where she scolds him. Aimlessly wandering, Hsiung's father meets an acquaintance, Feng-hua. The two, who shared a romantic connection years ago, find a storage room inside the building to have sex. Hsiung enters the conference centre posing as Wang's assistant and communicates instructions to him through an earpiece. When the president and legislators enter, Li's faction seals the doors before the vote. As the hearing begins and the legislators start to argue and fight, the president, who has previously visited the chemical plant, becomes infected with rabies and turns into a zombie. Panic ensues as everyone inside the centre tries to flee, but the locked doors trap them, and many politicians and journalists fall victim to the zombies.

From her position on the balcony, Hsiung lowers her jacket to help Wang, along with her father and Feng-hua, who have just left the storage room. The group then encounters Li's faction, who escape from a passageway in another meeting room, where Li notices that Wang has a wound on his arm. Li attempts to kill Wang, but Hsiung defends him, claiming that those infected with rabies will have red eyes, and Wang's eyes remain unchanged. As the zombies break into the room, the crowd begins to fight back. During the struggle, Wang's blood splatters onto a zombie, causing it to burn, and he realizes his blood is immune. Ku, the security guard, tries to escort everyone out, but the entrance remains sealed. Li proposes using another passageway that leads from the conference centre to the outside, though the key is held by the legislative president. The survivors fight their way back into the centre, where Li manages to obtain the key but then assaults Wang, extracting some of his blood to sell as a vaccine before escaping through the passageway alone. To buy time for the others to break open the door, Hsiung's father sacrifices himself, allowing the rest to escape just in time. While searching for an exit, they re-encounter Li in the bathroom, who has injected himself with the vaccine and mutated. The four fight him together, ultimately killing Li. Feng-hua, having lost hope after Hsiung's father's death, volunteers to delay the zombies, buying time for Hsiung, Wang, and Ku to escape safely through a window.

With most politicians dead from the zombie outbreak, a massive reelection takes place. Wang informs Hsiung that he will not run for office again, returning her the legislative seat, but she refuses and instead confirms their romantic bond by kissing him. In the end, Wang faces another gangster-politician resembling Li, who scolds him in the Legislative Yuan.

== Cast ==
- Megan Lai as Hsiung Ying-ying, a former legislator who entered parliament to oppose a controversial factory plant
- Bruce Hung as Wang You-wei, a security guard-turned-legislator who has been in love with Ying-ying since childhood
- Wang Chung-huang as Li Kuo-chung, a crooked gangster-politician
- Tuo Tsung-hua as Ying-ying's Father, a handyman in parliament who has romantic feelings for Feng-hua
- Francesca Kao as Wang Feng-hua, a human resources staff member in parliament
- Da-her Lin as Ku Te-you, a student undergoing substitute military service as a security guard in parliament

Also featuring cameo appearances from political commentator Chen Tzu-chien, comedian Brian Tseng, and YouTuber ChuChuShoe as zombies.

== Production ==
=== Development ===
After producing The Tag-Along (2015), screenwriter Chien Shih-keng and producer Hank Tseng expressed interest in making another Taiwan-based horror film and discussed potential topics, focusing on the popularity of zombie films at the time. In the early stages of developing the story, Chien and Tseng noticed that many zombie films were set in enclosed environments, leading Chien to propose the Legislative Yuan as the backdrop, which he found it to be most iconic and representational of Taiwan. In 2018, Chien attended the screening and was impressed by director Wang I-fan's debut short film 02-06 (2018) at the Taipei Film Festival, where it won Best Short Film, and invited him to join the project. Chien described the screenwriting process as full of clashes, as Wang, who is not a fan of zombie films, often suggested incorporating elements from other genres. Wang cited the biggest creative difference as the ending, as he wanted it to be more subtle and emotional, while Tseng preferred a more uplifting and comedic conclusion. Disinterested in Hollywood zombie movie tropes, Wang did not reference them in the film, instead drawing inspiration from the works of Quentin Tarantino, Edgar Wright, and Guy Ritchie. He also brought his frequent collaborator, action choreographer Teddy Ray Huang, on board as the action director.

The project had a budget of roughly 40 million NTD, and marks Taiwan's second zombie film, following Zombie 108 (2012). Preparation for the shoot began in March 2019. To prepare for their roles, Megan Lai and Bruce Hung underwent a month of wrestling lessons and ten martial arts training sessions, respectively. The film's pre-production, filming, and post-production occurred concurrently with Temple of Devilbuster (2020), another unrelated short film by Wang I-fan. Wang performed the rough cut of the film himself but was dissatisfied and collaborated with an editor to revise it. An official trailer was released in February 2020, along with a scheduled release date of 17 April 2020, but was ultimately postponed due to the COVID-19 pandemic.

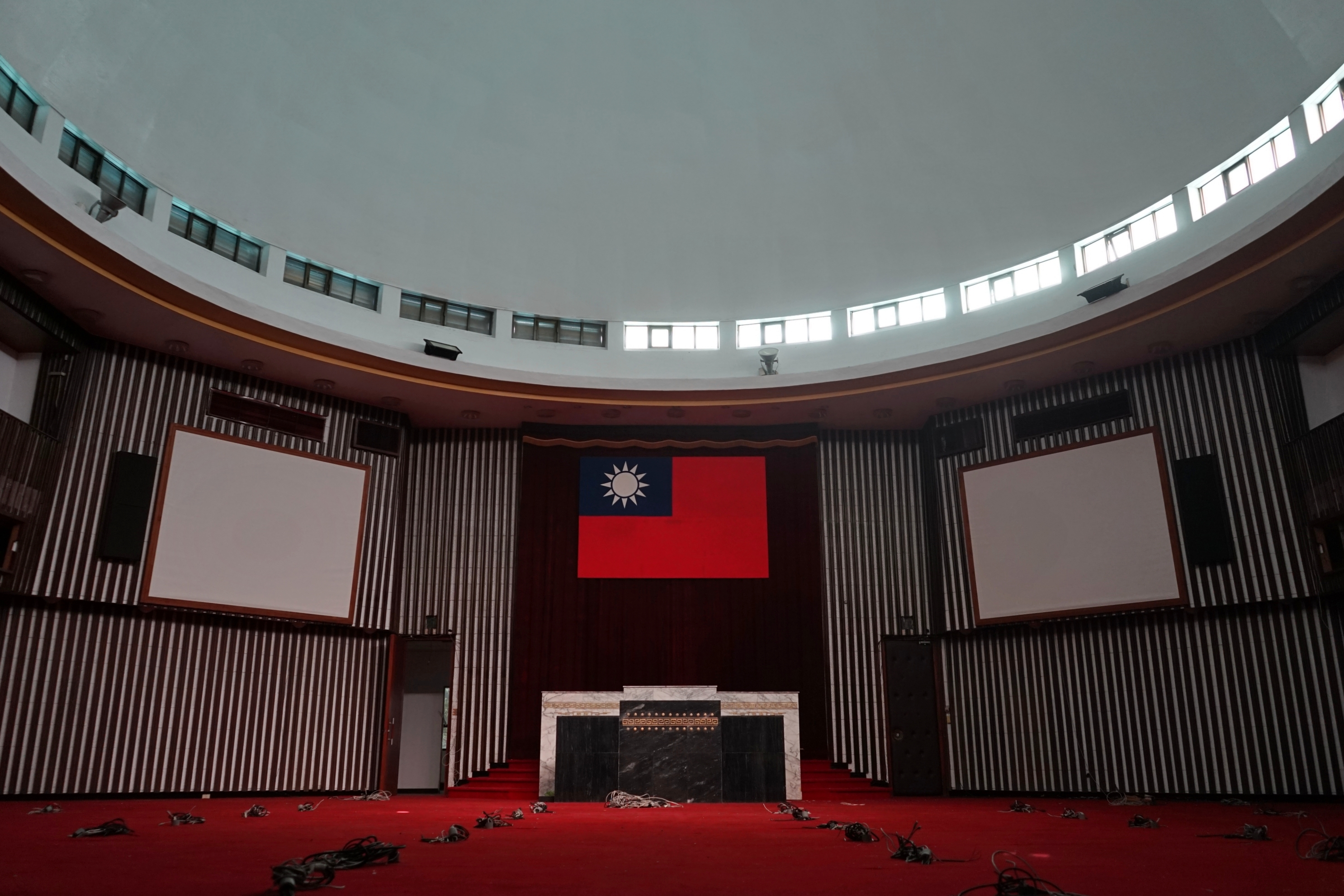
The former Kaohsiung City Council Hall, where Get the Hell Out was filmed

=== Filming ===
Principal photography began in the summer of 2019 and lasted for approximately two months. Filming primarily took place in the former Kaohsiung City Council Hall located in Cianjin District, Kaohsiung, which was used as the set for the Legislative Yuan in the film. The crew averaged ten-hour filming days, with action scenes shot using handheld cameras. The entire shoot took place inside the building without water, electricity and air-conditioning; however, since the film is set in winter, the actors had to wear thick coats during filming, which Megan Lai described as "an insane filming experience". Location shooting also occurred at Singuang Seaboard Park in Lingya District, Kaohsiung, and filming ultimately wrapped up in August 2019.

== Release ==
Get the Hell Out had its world premiere at the 22nd Taipei Film Festival on 28 June 2020, followed by an early screening held at the Legislative Yuan on 13 August, and was released theatrically in Taiwan on 14 August. The film was subsequently screened in the Midnight Madness section of the 45th Toronto International Film Festival, marking its North American premiere, followed by a screening in competition at the 7th Taoyuan Film Festival, as well as screenings at the 29th Philadelphia Film Festival, 2020 Lund International Fantastic Film Festival, 40th Hawaii International Film Festival, 47th Seattle International Film Festival, and 20th New York Asian Film Festival.

== Reception ==
=== Box office ===
Get the Hell Out grossed over 2.5 million NTD in its first week of release, and concluded its theatrical run with approximately 4 million NTD.

=== Critical response ===
On review aggregator Rotten Tomatoes, 71% of 24 critics gave the film a positive review with an average rating of 5.9/10.

Tim Grierson of Screen International described Get the Hell Out as a "sheer visual assault", noting that while it is filled with cheeky humor and suffers from poor character development, its "aesthetic brio" featuring "vibrant colours and frenetic editing" overshadows the film's faulty attempts at commentary and action. Joe Lipsett of Bloody Disgusting gave the film 4/5 marks, describing it as "an adrenaline shot of gory slapstick entertainment" and praising its thrilling action, which combines elements of Kung Fu Hustle (2004) and video game Scott Pilgrim, along with its humor, visuals, and set pieces. Chase Burns, reviewing for The Stranger, metaphorically likened watching the film to "ordering a quad espresso and injecting it straight into [one's] heart", as the story is "bloody, high-pitched, and feverishly paced".

Estella Huang, writing for Mirror Media, considered the film a "creatively fresh work" that reflects contemporary issues in the Taiwanese Legislative Yuan, finding that while its length weakens the narrative strength, the well-thought-out art direction, scoring, and performances, along with director Wang I-fan's insights on the future of Taiwanese politics, make it an interesting and worthwhile watch. Reuben Baron discussed the "complex work of political satire" in his review for Comic Book Resources, observing that the film excels as an entertaining "dumb movie" with its bloody vibes, comedy, and action, while effectively capturing a sense of "political ignorance" that echoes its themes and reflects deeper social issues particularly relevant in 2020. J. Hurtado of Screen Anarchy also lauded the film's clever satire of Taiwan's political landscape through its absurd connection between the legislature and a zombie outbreak, particularly its well-paced and inventive action sequences that combine humor, horror, and political commentary.

Barry Hertz of The Globe and Mail described Get the Hell Out as a zombie film "as interested in spilling guts as it is in skewering science-illiterate politicians", while commending its satire and political critique on issues like anti-vaccination, capitalism, and political corruption, he pointed out that the excessive energy and Mortal Kombat-like fighting sequences by the end of the film are slightly exhausting. David Crow of Den of Geek shared a similar view, while acknowledging the film's amusing premise that only could work well as "sketch comedy or a short video", he bashed on the film's clichéd script and narrative thinness, as well as the anime and video game-like action that hinders the overall pace and coherence. Jason Gorber, giving the film a 5/10 in his review for /Film, also pointed out that it suffers from a misdirection in attempting to "craft a bit of comically violent nonsense with a dash of democratic deviance thrown in", ultimately resulting in a failure on both fronts.

David Ehrlich of IndieWire gave the film a C, criticizing its lack of depth and arguing that while it addresses political issues through an absurd zombie narrative, it ultimately prioritizes flashy violence and chaos over meaningful commentary, resulting in the film's messages about real-life issues being drowned out by repetitive zombie-fighting tropes and reduced to mere afterthoughts. James Marsh of South China Morning Post gave the film 2/5 stars and shared a similar opinion, criticizing its lack of meaningful political commentary, despite its promising setup for satire in a chaotic political landscape, it focuses on frantic pacing and superficial humor over insightful critique, leaving audiences "exhausted". Katie Rife, writing for The A.V. Club, gave the film a C+ from the perspective of an international audience, remarking that while the thrilling pace and absurd premise about corruption are "great fun" for Western viewers, the political satire, culturally specific elements, and vibrant Japanese-style visuals may be "lost on Westerners".

Han Cheung of Taipei Times lamented the film for focusing too heavily on its frenetic and campy zombie genre elements, which ultimately detracts from its potential for deeper political commentary and social critique, resulting in a chaotic experience that feels lacking in substance despite its entertaining moments. Review for Hong Kong Inmedia, Ben Lam offered similar comments on the film's bold attempt to combine political satire and zombie elements, as it failed to fully utilize its potential for character and story arcs, resulting in repetitive pacing and a lack of coherence that makes the film feel "uncreative and like a one-trick pony". Sek Kei was also critical on the characters in his review for Stand News, albeit praising the heroine vibes of Megan Lai's character, he found the rest of the ensemble underdeveloped, particularly the characters portrayed by Bruce Hung and Tuo Tsung-hua, and called the film less effective and appealing to the similarly themed Detention (2019).

== Awards and nominations ==
Year	Award	Category	Nominee	Result	Ref.
2020	45th Toronto International Film Festival	People's Choice Award, Midnight Madness	—N/a	Nominated	
2020	7th Taoyuan Film Festival	Taiwan Award	—N/a	Nominated	
2020	57th Golden Horse Awards	Best Supporting Actress	Francesca Kao	Nominated	
2020	57th Golden Horse Awards	Best Action Choreography	Teddy Ray Huang, Li Shao-peng	Won	
2021	2nd Taiwan Film Critics Society Awards	Special Honour	Teddy Ray Huang, Li Shao-peng	Won	
