= Who Killed Cock Robin (film) =

- Theatrical release poster
- Directed by: Cheng Wei-hao
- Screenplay by: Cheng Wei-hao; Lily Chen; Chen Yen-Chi
- Story by: Cheng Ze-Qing; Dorothy Chen
- Produced by: David Tang; Hu Alba; He Yuwen; Hua Kai-Tien; Tung Wen-Chun
- Starring: Kaiser Chuang; Hsu Wei-ning; Ko Chia-yen; Christopher Lee; Mason Lee
- Cinematography: Chen Chi-wen
- Edited by: Kipo Lin
- Music by: Li Ming-chieh
- Production company: Rise Pictures
- Distributed by: Vie Vision Pictures
- Release date: 31 March 2017
- Running time: 118 minutes
- Country: Taiwan
- Languages: Mandarin, Taiwanese
- Budget: NT$43 million
- Box office: NT$52.4 million (Taiwan)

Who Killed Cock Robin (Mandarin: 目擊者, lit. "Eyewitness") is a 2017 Taiwanese neo-noir crime thriller film, written and directed by Cheng Wei-hao. The film follows a journalist who unravels a series of mysteries as he investigates a long-forgotten hit-and-run accident that occurred nine years ago. It also marked Cheng's second collaboration with Hsu Wei-ning, after The Tag-Along. The film also stars Kaiser Chuang, Ko Chia-yen, Christopher Lee and Mason Lee. It was released on 31 March 2017, in Taiwan.

== Premise ==
Nine years ago, journalist Hsiao-chi witnessed a hit-and-run crash on a mountain road when his vehicle broke down. In that accident which happened on a stormy night, the male driver was instantly killed, and the female passenger Hsu Ai-ting fell into a coma. In a panic, Hsiao-chi took photos of the hit-and-run vehicle registration plate. However, the pictures were too blurry to be used as evidence, and therefore facts of the accident were never established. Years later, Hsiao-chi discovers that his second-hand car is connected to that accident and he begins his search for the truth behind this long forgotten case.

== Cast ==
- Kaiser Chuang as Wang Yi-chi (Hsiao-chi), journalist
- Hsu Wei-ning as Maggie, journalist and Hsiao-chi's supervisor
- Ko Chia-yen as Hsu Ai-ting, car accident survivor
- Christopher Lee as Chiu Ching-kai (Chiu-ge), chief editor
- Mason Lee as Chou Cheng-wei (A-wei), junior police officer
- Cheng Chih-wei as A-chi, car mechanic
- Ian Chen as Liao Tzu-fan, Hsu's boyfriend
- Tang Chih-wei as Chung-wen
- Mario Pu as Wang

== Production ==
Principal photography on the film began in March 2016. Filming wrapped up one and a half months later. Much of the film was shot using a handheld camera, with the intention of conveying the realist setting. The director stated: "by using such a technique it makes the audiences feel as if they were the witnesses themselves."

== Soundtrack ==
Who Killed Cock Robin

Soundtrack album by Li Ming-chieh
- Released: 31 March 2017
- Genre: Film soundtrack
- Label: MUSDM

No.	Title	Length
1.	"Story Beginning"	01:42
2.	"Accident"	01:42
3.	"Hi Wang Sir"	02:28
4.	"Ons"	02:27
5.	"True One"	02:15
6.	"Old Memory"	03:58
7.	"Newspaper Office"	02:38
8.	"Oriental Beauty Tea"	04:40
9.	"Who Is It"	01:54
10.	"Handcuffs"	05:10
11.	"True Two"	02:18
12.	"Wei Story"	04:56
13.	"Looking For....."	02:12
14.	"True Three"	04:54
15.	"I Am Sorry (feat. Lisa Liang)"	01:58
16.	"Combet"	03:10
17.	"Kidnap"	04:24
18.	"Horror Story"	04:48
19.	"Wkcr Song"	02:30

== Awards and nominations ==
Award	Category	Recipients	Result
54th Golden Horse Awards	Best Leading Actor	Kaiser Chuang	Nominated
54th Golden Horse Awards	Best Supporting Actor	Mason Lee	Nominated
54th Golden Horse Awards	Best Visual Effects	Yeh Jen-hao and Liu Wei-yi	Nominated
54th Golden Horse Awards	Best Film Editing	Kipo Lin	Nominated
54th Golden Horse Awards	Best Sound Effects	R.T Kao, Chen Wei-liang and Forgood Sound	Nominated
