= Roy Chiu =

Taiwanese actor, singer and racing driver

- 邱澤
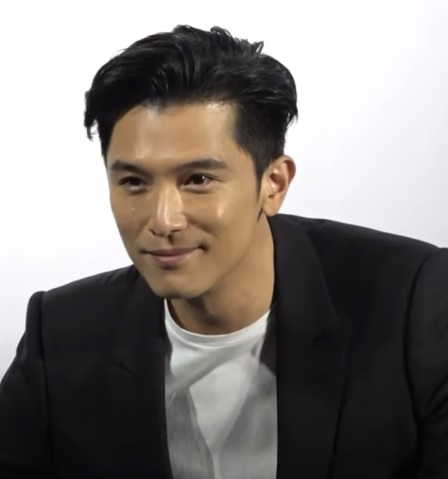
- Chiu in June 2022
- Born: 14 October 1981 (age 44); Nangang, Taipei, Taiwan
- Other names: Chiu Tse; Qiu Ze
- Education: Taipei Physical Education College
- Occupations: Actor; singer; racing driver
- Years active: 2002–present
- Spouse: Tiffany Hsu (m. 2021)
- Children: 1

Chinese name
- Traditional Chinese: 邱澤
- Simplified Chinese: 邱泽
- Hanyu Pinyin: Qiū Zé
- Jyutping: jau1 zak6
- Hokkien POJ: Khu Te̍k
- Musical career
- Genres: Mandopop
- Instruments: Vocals, guitar
- Label: EMI Music

Roy Chiu (Chinese: 邱澤; pinyin: Qiū Zé; Pe̍h-ōe-jī: Khu Te̍k; born 14 October 1981) is a Taiwanese actor, singer and racing driver. He earned two Golden Horse Award for Best Leading Actor nominations for his performances in Dear Ex (2018) and Man in Love (2021) and also received two Taipei Film Award for Best Actor for these two performances.

== Filmography ==
=== Film ===
Year	Title	Role	Notes
2004	Date		Unreleased
2007	Butterfly Love		
2008	Poetry of Summer	Xu Yujie / Summer	Short film
2009	L-O-V-E	Actor in segment "Xing yun"	
2010	Rely	A Che	
2011	Arthur Christmas	Arthur Claus (voice)	Taiwanese version
2013	Good Luck! Boy	Li Mengze	
2015	An Accidental Shot of Love	Sun Yao	
2015	Romance Out of the Blue	Hu Yingjun	
2017	Dan Ban Chu Shen	Summer	
2018	Samsara		
2018	Dear Ex	Ah Jie	
2019	The Gangs, the Oscars, and the Walking Dead	BS	
2019	The 9th Precinct	Ahao	
2021	I Missed You	Homeless man	
2021	Detective Chinatown 3	Lin Mo	
2021	Man in Love	A Cheng	
2023	An Encounter to Remember	Liu Yingjun	
2025	Girl	Father	
2026	Vanishing Point	Yan Wu	

=== Television ===
Year	Title	Role	Notes	Ref(s)
2002	Starry Starry Night	Qiu Ze		
2003	First Love	Da Fei	Cameo	
2003	Original Scent of Summer	Xia Ri		
2003	Living with Lydia	Himself		
2004	Basketball Tribe	Gao Fei		
2004	Ping Pong	Jiang Tao	Cameo	
2005	Beyond The aXis of Truth II	Kong Zhijie		
2005	Wind Warrior	Wei Tingjun		
2005	P.S...I Luv U	Lin Shouxin / Xu Nuoyan		
2006	Yours Always	Zhang Shaoqi		
2006	Parallel Lines	Xiao Jie		
2008	Woody Sambo	Zhao Weiqing		
2009	Easy Fortune Happy Life	Han Dongjie		
2009	My Youth	Beautiful man		
2009	Liao Zhai 3	Meng Longtan		
2009	The Girl in Blue	Ruan Zhengdong		
2011	My Daughters	Yan Ge		
2011	Unbeatable	Wei Xiao		
2011	Office Girls	Qin Ziqi		
2011	Waking Love Up	Xiang Tianqi		
2012	Miss Rose	Gao Chengkuan		
2012	Wine Beauty	Shen Zihao		
2013	Super Cinderella	Li Feng		
2014	Cold Love Be Passionately in Love	Liang Xiaodong		
2015	Marry Me, or Not?	Hao Meng / Justin		
2016	Golden Darling	Huang Jinfa		
2016	Luxury Era	Xie Wei		
2016	In Love – The Last Gentleness	Lee Chien-chiao		
2018	The Family	Fang Tianyi		
2018		Meng Xing		
2019	Let Me Understand Your Language	Xu Haoning		
2019	Yong-Jiu Grocery Store	Cheng En-pei		
2020–2024	Detective Chinatown	Lin Mo	Lead Role, 16 Episodes	
2021	The Arc of Life	Cheng Yi-nan		
2021	My Treasure	Gu Fei		
2022	Sub Zero 197			

=== Music video appearances ===
Year	Title	Artist
2001	"Honestly"	Joey Yung
2001	"Solemn On Stage"	Joey Yung
2001	"Thank You For Loving Me"	Joey Yung
2001	"Goodbye My First Love"	Joey Yung
2002	"Closer"	Chris Yu
2002	"I'm Here"	Siren
2006	"Flight Tribe"	F.I.R.
2006	"Deeply in Love With Him"	F.I.R.
2008	"Do You Understand"	Achau
2008	"Pàng pàng"	Achau
2009	"How Are You?"	Achau
2011	"Xiǎng fēi de zì yóu luò tǐ"	Genie Chuo
2015	"Imperfect Heartbeat"	Yu Chiu-hsin
2015	"Circling"	Yoga Lin
2015	"Love's Forever"	Joanne Tseng and Real
2016	"Love Without Fear"	Sammi Cheng

== Discography ==
=== Studio albums ===
Title	Album details	Track listing
Qiu Ze 邱澤	Released: 6 January 2002; Label: Skyhigh Entertainment; Formats: CD, digital download	Track listing: 1. 序曲~黑斗篷; 2. 祝我生日快樂; 3. 秋天的地圖 (7–11鐵道秋郊廣告曲); 4. 他們很忙Easy 4U (光陽機車告曲); 5. 愛只剩一天; 6. 冷風; 7. 我不是你的王子; 8. 遐想; 9. 夜景; 10. 20歲的界線(Bonus Track) ("大漢天子"片尾曲); 11. 你知道我愛你 ("雪地裡的星星"主題曲)
I Don't Understand 不懂	Released: 1 August 2003; Label: Skyhigh Entertainment; Formats: CD, digital download	Track listing: 1. 先生我聽不懂; 2. 赤裸; 3. 字 給文字 T 作者; 4. 圖騰; 5. 當我不在吧; 6. 別跳下去; 7. 太陽之吻; 8. 無限; 9. 新世界; 10. 旁觀者

=== Compilation albums ===
Title	Album details	Track listing
Remember 邱澤全記憶精選	Released: 2 April 2003; Label: Skyhigh Entertainment; Formats: CD, digital download	Track listing: 1. Remember; 2. 你知道我愛你; 3. Easy 4 U (他們很忙 ) 4. 20歲的界線; 5. 當我不在吧; 6. 做你的英雄; 7. 原味的夏天; 8. 秋天的地圖; 9. 無限; 10. 預約夏天; 11. 惦記這一些; 12. 愛只剩一天; 13. 是你; 14. 祝我生日快樂; 15. 先生 我聽不懂; 16. 親愛的朋友 (大合唱)

=== Soundtrack albums ===
Title	Album details	Track listing
Starry Starry Night OST 雪地里之星星电视原声带	Released: 6 January 2002; Label: Skyhigh Entertainment; Formats: CD, digital download	Track listing: 1. 你知道我愛你 ("雪地裡的星星"主題曲); 2. 是你; 3. 做妳的英雄
Original Scent of Summer OST 原味的夏天電視原聲帶	Released: 18 November 2003; Label: Skyhigh Entertainment; Formats: CD, digital download	Track listing: 1. 原味的夏天; 2. 惦記這一些; 3. 預約夏天 – 邱澤 方皓玟; 4. 蓝色爱情; 5. 一滴思念的淚; 6. 一個人; 7. 20歲的界線; 8. 慾望
Woody Sambo OST 無敵珊寶妹電視原聲帶	Released: 5 September 2008; Label: Warner Music Group; Formats: CD, digital download	Track listing: 1. 微不足道
Wine Beauty OST 紅酒俏佳人電視劇原聲帶	Released: 6 January 2015; Label: Shanghai Tan Xuan Music; Formats: digital download	Track listing: 1. 宣言

== Awards and nominations ==
Year	Award	Category	Nominated work	Result
2012	1st Sanlih Drama Awards	Best Actor	Office Girls	Won
2012	1st Sanlih Drama Awards	Popularity Award	Miss Rose	Won
2016	51st Golden Bell Awards	Best Leading Actor in a Television Series	Marry Me, or Not?	Nominated
2016	51st Golden Bell Awards	Best Leading Actor in a Miniseries or Television Film	In Love – The Last Gentleness	Nominated
2018	20th Taipei Film Awards	Best Actor	Dear Ex	Won
2018	55th Golden Horse Awards	Best Leading Actor	Dear Ex	Nominated
2019	19th Chinese Film Media Awards	Best Actor	Dear Ex	Nominated
2021	23rd Taipei Film Awards	Best Actor	Man in Love	Won
2021	58th Golden Horse Awards	Best Leading Actor	Man in Love	Nominated
