= The Hidden Sword =

- Promotional poster
- Chinese: 刀背藏身
- Hanyu Pinyin: Dāo bèi cáng shēn
- Directed by: Xu Haofeng
- Screenplay by: Xu Haofeng
- Based on: The Hidden Sword by Xu Haofeng
- Produced by: Guan Dandan; Chen Dongqiu
- Starring: Xu Qing; Jessie Li; Zhang Aoyue
- Cinematography: Shao Dan
- Edited by: Xu Haofeng; He Sisi
- Music by: An Wei
- Production company: Poly Film
- Distributed by: Poly Film
- Release date: August 27, 2017 (WFF)
- Running time: 136 minutes
- Country: China
- Language: Mandarin
- Budget: CN¥80 million

The Hidden Sword is a 2017 Chinese martial arts film written and directed by Xu Haofeng and adapted from Xu's novel of the same name. The film stars Xu Qing, Jessie Li and Zhang Aoyue.

== Cast ==
- Xu Qing as Zhihui
- Jessie Li as Qingqing
- Zhang Aoyue as Kong Dingyi
- Huang Jue as Imposter of Shen Feixue
- Geng Le as Er Bao
- Chen Kuan-tai as Master Kong
- Li Guangjie as Shen Feixue
- Li Bo
- Hung Yan-yan

== Awards and nominations ==
Award	Category	Recipients	Result	Ref.
41st Montreal World Film Festival	Best Artistic Contribution	The Hidden Sword	Won	
54th Golden Horse Awards	Best New Performer	Zhang Aoyue	Nominated	
54th Golden Horse Awards	Best Adapted Screenplay	Xu Haofeng	Nominated	
54th Golden Horse Awards	Best Action Choreography	Xu Haofeng	Nominated	
54th Golden Horse Awards	Best Original Film Score	An Wei	Nominated	
