= Man in Love (2021 film) =

- Theatrical release poster
- Traditional Chinese: 當男人戀愛時
- Simplified Chinese: 当男人恋爱时
- Hanyu Pinyin: Dāng nánrén liàn'ài shí
- Hokkien POJ: Tong lâm-jîn loân-ài sî
- Directed by: Yin Chen-hao
- Written by: Fu Kai-ling; Chien Chieh-chung
- Based on: Man in Love by Han Dong-wook and Yu Gap-yeol
- Produced by: Cheng Wei-hao; Veronica Jin
- Starring: Roy Chiu; Tiffany Hsu
- Cinematography: Chen Chi-wen
- Edited by: Chen Chun-hung
- Production companies: Calendar Studios; Zhong Creation Film Culture Media Co. Limited
- Distributed by: Sony Pictures (Taiwan; Theatrical); Netflix (Worldwide; OTT)
- Release date: 1 April 2021 (Taiwan)
- Running time: 115 minutes
- Country: Taiwan
- Language: Taiwanese
- Box office: US$52,946,097

Man in Love (Chinese: 當男人戀愛時; Pe̍h-ōe-jī: Tong lâm-jîn loân-ài sî) is a 2021 Taiwanese romance drama film directed by Yin Chen-hao, and starring Roy Chiu and Ann Hsu. The film is a remake of Han Dong-wook's 2014 South Korean film of the same name.

== Plot ==
A debt collector strikes a deal with a debt-ridden woman struggling to care for her ailing father: he will take care of her bills if she agrees to date him.

== Cast ==
- Roy Chiu as Zhang Meng-cheng (Ah Cheng)
- Ann Hsu as Hao Ting
- Tsai Chen-nan as Ah Cheng and Dawei's father
- Tan Qing-pu as Hao Ting's father
- Chung Hsin-ling as Cai Yu'e (Sister Cai)
- Lan Wei-hsu as Zhang Da-wei, Ah Cheng's brother
- Peace Yang as Shu-ling, Dawei's wife
- Lulu Huang Lu Zi Yin as Yaya

== Box office ==
The film was number one in Taiwan for three weeks.

== Awards and nominations ==
Award	Category	Recipients	Result	Ref.
23rd Taipei Film Awards	Best Feature Film	Man in Love	Nominated	
23rd Taipei Film Awards	Best Director	Yin Chen-hao	Nominated	
23rd Taipei Film Awards	Best Leading Actor	Roy Chiu	Won	
23rd Taipei Film Awards	Best Leading Actress	Ann Hsu	Nominated	
23rd Taipei Film Awards	Best Supporting Actress	Chung Hsin-ling	Nominated	
23rd Taipei Film Awards	Best Film Editing	Chen Junhong	Nominated	
23rd Taipei Film Awards	Best Makeup & Costume Design	Lin Yuyuan, Su Tinghui	Nominated	
58th Golden Horse Awards	Best Leading Actor	Roy Chiu	Nominated	
58th Golden Horse Awards	Best Supporting Actress	Chung Hsin-ling	Nominated	
58th Golden Horse Awards	Best New Director	Yin Chen-hao	Nominated	
58th Golden Horse Awards	Best Original Film Song	"Oh Love, You Are Much Greater Than I Imagined"	Nominated	
