= Hsu Wei-ning =

Taiwanese actress and model (born 1984)

Tiffany Ann Hsu
- Hsu in 2026
- Born: Hsu Wei-ning; 7 August 1984 (age 42); Taipei City, Taiwan
- Other names: Tiffany Hsu; Ann Hsu; Xu Weining
- Education: Chinese Culture University
- Occupations: Actress; model; VJ
- Years active: 2003–present
- Spouse: Roy Chiu (m. 2021)
- Children: 1

Chinese name
- Traditional Chinese: 許瑋甯
- Simplified Chinese: 许玮甯
- Hanyu Pinyin: Xǔ Wěinìng

Hsu Wei-ning (Chinese: 許瑋甯; pinyin: Xǔ Wěinìng; born 7 August 1984), also known as Tiffany Ann Hsu, is a Taiwanese actress and model. Hsu began her career as a model, and first came to attention for her supporting roles in the Taiwanese drama series It Started with a Kiss and its sequel They Kiss Again. She also worked as a VJ for MTV Taiwan.

Her performance as Doris in the Taiwanese film Design 7 Love earned her a Golden Horse Award nomination for Best New Performer. She appeared in the drama series The Way We Were, for which she won a Golden Bell Award for Best Supporting Actress. She is also known for starring in the supernatural horror film The Tag-Along (2015) and its sequel The Tag-Along 2 (2017).

== Early life ==
Hsu's father is Italian-American and her mother is Taiwanese. Her father abandoned the family when she was two, leaving her mother to raise Hsu with the assistance of her maternal grandparents and her other family members. Hsu attended the Hwa Kang Arts School in Taipei where she was classmates with Rainie Yang and Alien Huang. She graduated from the Chinese Cultural University with a major in Drama Acting in 2007. Friends call her by her middle name, Ann, which is also the English name listed on her agency's profile webpage.

== Career ==
Hsu was first noticed by Catwalk Model Agency when she participated in a talent casting for MTV Taiwan and was then signed up to be a fashion model in 2003.

In 2004, Hsu appeared in her first TV series Jia You Fei Fei (家有菲菲) and sang the theme song "甜姐辣妹". In 2005, she starred in the series It Started with a Kiss as second female lead. In 2007, Hsu appeared in her first film Amour-Legende (松鼠自殺事件). In 2009, Hsu starred in the idol drama ToGetHer and Autumn's Concerto. In 2011, Hsu starred as the second female lead of the TV drama Love You. In 2012, Hsu appeared in the micro-film Wishing for Happiness. She also starred as the female lead for the first time in the romance-drama series, Love Me or Leave Me, as a woman who was afraid of getting married but then regretted her decision when another woman tried to steal her boyfriend. In 2014, she starred in her first film as female lead in Design 7 Love (相愛的七種設計). Hsu also starred in a Resorts World Sentosa promotional four-part micro-film series titled Cupid's World of Happiness (丘比特的幸福世界) alongside Leon Jay Williams and Xiao Xiao Bin. The 40-minute-long microfilm (four episodes of 10 minutes each) tells the story of two vacationers unexpectedly meeting and finding love with each other through a series of adventures during their stay at Resorts World Sentosa. In 2014, Hsu earned wider recognition after appearing in the TVBS series The Way We Were. Her performance won her a Golden Bell Award for Best Supporting Actress.

In 2015, Hsu starred in the horror film The Tag-Along, playing a smart and independent radio DJ who has a fear of commitment in relationships. The movie was well received by critics and did well at the box-office in Taiwan. It opened in second place with NT$8.73 million over three days, which is the best opening for a Taiwanese film since Our Times.

== Personal life ==
From 2006 to 2015, Hsu dated actor Ethan Juan.

In October 2017, Hsu and Taiwanese cinematographer Liu You-nian were confirmed to be in a relationship. They broke up at the end of 2020.

On 10 December 2021, Hsu announced her marriage to Roy Chiu, her co-star in the 2021 romance film Man in Love. She announced the birth of their first child on 14 August 2025.

== Filmography ==
=== Television series ===
Year	English title	Original title	Role	Notes/Ref.
2004	Jia You Fei Fei	家有菲菲	Fei Fei	
2005	It Started with a Kiss	惡作劇之吻	Pei Ziyu	
2007	They Kiss Again	惡作劇2吻	Pei Ziyu	
2008	Time Story	光陰的故事	Ni Ni	
2009	ToGetHer	愛就宅一起	Yan Shijia	
2009	Autumn's Concerto	下一站，幸福	He Yiqian	
2009	Roseate-Love	紫玫瑰	Mina	
2010	Qing Mi Xing Ti Yan	清蜜星体验	Virgo Wen Hsiu	
2010	Scent of Love	就是要香戀	Li Zhenzhen	
2010	Days We Stared at the Sun	他們在畢業的前一天爆炸	Policewoman	
2011	Love You	醉後決定愛上你	Avril Tang	
2012	Love Me or Leave Me	我租了一個情人	Ji Qing	
2012	The Late Night Stop	小站	Wu Yating	
2014	The Way We Were	16個夏天	Zheng Ruirui	
2015	Wake Up	麻醉風暴	Yang Wei-yu	
2016	Rock Records in Love	滾石愛情故事	Hsu Chung-hsiu	Episode: "Infatuation" ("鬼迷心竅")
2016	Fresh Off the Boat	菜鳥新移民	Margaret	Season 3, episode: "Coming from America"
2017	Wake Up 2	麻醉風暴2	Yang Wei-yu	
2018	My Dear Boy	我的男孩	Assistant	Episode 19
2020–2024	The Victims' Game	誰是被害者	Hsu Hai-yin	Netflix series
2020	Missing Persons	失蹤人口	Kuo Lan	Web series (special appearance)
2021	Dear Diary	我的巴比倫戀人	Long-nv	Web series
2022	Shards of Her	她和她的她	Lin Chen-xi	Netflix series
2022	Lesson in Love	第9節課	Chen Meng-yun	iQIYI series
2024	Imperfect Us	不夠善良的我們	Rebecca	GTV and Public Television Service

=== Film ===
Year	English title	Original title	Role	Notes
2006	Amour-Legende	松鼠自殺事件	Coco	
2009	Taipei 24H	台北異想	Boss's Woman	Segment "Save the Lover"
2010	The Bund 1848-1945	外灘佚事	Li Xianglan	Documentary film
2010	How Are You? I'm Fine	你好嗎？我很好		Samsung micro film
2012	Cupid's World of Happiness	丘比特的幸福世界		Resorts World Sentosa micro film
2012	Wishing for Happiness	想幸福的人	Girl by the river	Micro film
2014	Design 7 Love	相愛的七種設計	Doris	
2014	Dream Flight	想飛	Xie Xinyi	
2015	Inside Out	腦筋急轉彎	Sadness	Taiwanese version, voice
2015	End of A Century: Mia's Story	世紀末的華麗	Mia	Short film
2015	The Tag-Along	紅衣小女孩	Shen Yi-chun	
2015	White Lies, Black Lies	失控謊言	Hsiao-chen	
2017	Battle of Memories	記憶大師	Mysterious woman	
2017	Who Killed Cock Robin	目擊者	Maggie	
2017	A Nail Clipper Romance	指甲刀人魔	Carman	
2017	Ning	甯		Short film for Vogue Taiwan
2017	The Tag-Along 2	紅衣小女孩2	Shen Yi-chun	
2018	The Tag-Along: The Devil Fish	人面魚：紅衣小女孩外傳	Shen Yi-chun	Special appearance
2021	In Dreams, We Investigate	夢中搜查令		APUJAN AW2021 short film
2021	Home Sweet Home	秘密訪客	Mom	
2021	Man in Love	當男人戀愛時	Hao-ting	
2021	The Falls	瀑布	Doctor	Cameo
2022	The Darker the Lake	詭棋	Rebeka	
TBA	The Strangled Truth	滅相		

=== Music video appearances ===
Year	Artist	Song title
2003	Lee Wei	"666"
2003	Lin Yo Wei	"That Street"
2004	Alex To	"Love You So Much"
2004	Leehom Wang	"The Heart's Sun and Moon"
2008	Kenji Wu	"Love Hurts"
2010	Vanness Wu	"Reason"
2010	Eddie Peng	"Corner of Summer"
2012	Will Pan	"Forgetting the Hug"
2013	Hush	"Psycho Love"
2014	Eric Chou	"My Way To Love"
2017	Kenji Wu	"Haunted Call"
2017	Eric Chou	"The Way You Make Me Feel"
2019	Coco Lee	"Broken"
2021	EggPlantEgg	"Oh Love, You Are Much Greater Than I Imagined"

== Theatre ==
Year	English title	Original title	Notes	Ref.
2020	My First Wives	我的大老婆	Godot Theatre Company	

== Discography ==
=== Singles ===
Year	Song title	Notes
2004	"Tián Jiě Là Mèi" (甜姐辣妹)	Duet with Angel Yao
2017	"The Way You Make Me Feel" (黏黏)	Eric Chou feat. Hsu Wei-ning
2020	"Everyone Is A Ghost" (每個人都是鬼)	The Victims' Game promotional single
2020	"A Sound of Laughter in the Vast Sea 2020" (滄海一聲笑2020)	New Swordsman M promotional single

== Published works ==
English title	Original title	Author	Date published	Publisher
Ann's Day	Ann's Day： 關於美好的味覺記憶	Hsu Wei-ning	19 May 2012	Kate Publishing

== Awards and nominations ==
Year	Event	Category	Nominated work	Result
2014	Golden Horse Awards	Best New Performer	Design 7 Love	Nominated
2015	Chinese Film Media Awards	Best New Performer	Design 7 Love	Nominated
2015	Golden Bell Awards	Best Supporting Actress	The Way We Were	Won
2015	Macau International Movie Festival	Best Actress	Dream Flight	Nominated
2016	Taipei Film Awards	Best Actress	The Tag-Along	Won
2016	Taipei Film Awards	Best Actress	White Lies, Black Lies	Won
2016	Taipei Film Awards	Best Actress	End of A Century: Miea's Story	Won
2016	Golden Horse Awards	Best Leading Actress	The Tag-Along	Nominated
2017	Asia-Pacific Producers' Network Awards	Best Actress	—N/a	Won
2017	Golden Bell Awards	Best Leading Actress (Miniseries or TV Film)	Rock Records in Love - Infatuation	Nominated
2017	Golden Horse Awards	Best Supporting Actress	The Tag-Along 2	Nominated
2018	58th Asia Pacific Film Festival	Best Supporting Actress	The Tag-Along 2	Nominated
2021	23rd Taipei Film Awards	Best Actress	Man in Love	Nominated
2022	2021 Yahoo Asia Buzz Awards	Popular Actress	—N/a	Won
2023	58th Golden Bell Awards	Best Leading Actress in a Miniseries or TV Film	Shards of Her	Won
2023	28th Asian Television Awards	Best Actress in a Leading Role	Lesson in Love	Nominated
2024	59th Golden Bell Awards	Best Leading Actress in a Miniseries or TV Film	Imperfect Us	Won
