= Yvonne Yao =

Taiwanese actress (born 1981)

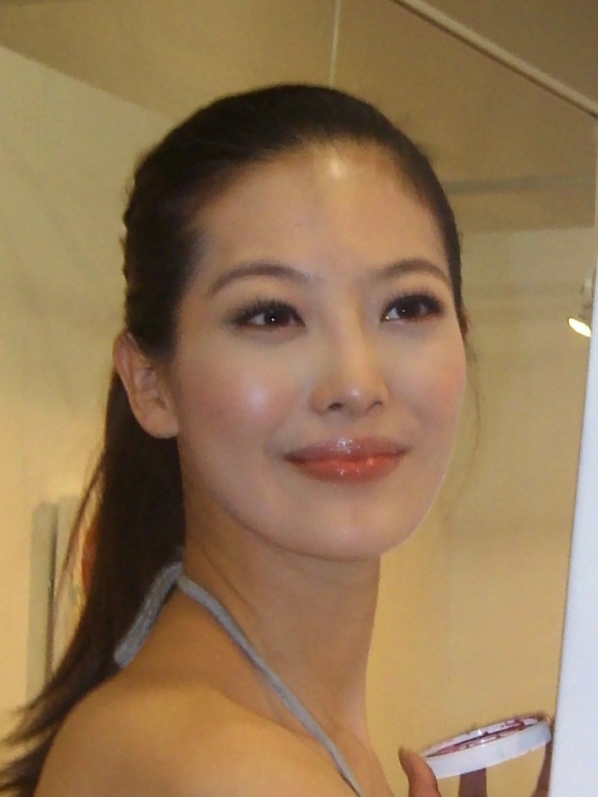
- Yao in 2008
- Born: November 16, 1981 (age 44); Taipei, Taiwan
- Occupation: Actress

Chinese name
- Traditional Chinese: 姚采穎
- Simplified Chinese: 姚采颖
Transcriptions
Standard Mandarin
- Hanyu Pinyin: Yáo Cǎiyǐng

Yvonne Yao (Chinese: 姚采穎; pinyin: Yáo Cǎiyǐng) is a Taiwanese actress.

== Filmography ==
=== Film ===
Year	English title	Original title	Role	Notes
2012	Zombie 108	棄城Z-108	Linda	
2016	22nd Catch	22個男人		

=== Television series ===
Year	English title	Original title	Role	Notes
2012	Mulan on the Run	木蘭花	Wang Yulian	
