= Back to Home =

2019 Taiwanese television series

- Promotional poster
- 月村歡迎你
- Genre: Romantic comedy
- Written by: Yaya Chang 張綺恩 (Screenwriter coordinator); Lian Kai Hong 連凱鴻; Li Jie Yu 李婕瑀; Lu Xin Ci 陸昕慈
- Directed by: Ker Choon Hooi 郭春暉
- Starring: Hsieh Kunda; Cosmos Lin; Wu Nien-hsuan; Li Jia-yu; Yang Kuei-mei
- Opening theme: Self-complacement 愛情怎麼了嗎 by Crowd Lu
- Ending theme: Vulnerability 如果我沒有傷口 by Jolin Tsai
- Country of origin: Taiwan
- Original language: Mandarin
- No. of seasons: 1
- No. of episodes: 18

Production
- Producers: Huang Yu Tang 黃毓棠; Wu Can Qi 吳璨琦
- Production location: Taiwan
- Running time: 90 minutes
- Production companies: Sanlih E-Television 三立電視; Enjoy Entertainment 怡佳娛樂經紀股份有限公司

Original release
- Network: TTV; SET Metro
- Release: 5 May – 1 September 2019

Back to Home (Chinese: 月村歡迎你; pinyin: Yuè cūn huān yíng nǐ, Also Called - Welcome To Moon Village) is a 2019 Taiwanese television series created and produced by SETTV. It stars Hsieh Kunda, Cosmos Lin, Wu Nien-hsuan, Li Jia-yu and Yang Kuei-mei. Filming began on 20 January 2019 and ended on 11 July 2019. It was first broadcast on 5 May 2019 on TTV and aired every Sunday from 10 pm to 11.30 pm.

== Cast ==
=== Main cast ===
- Hsieh Kunda as Bi Guo-jian 畢國建
  - Ruan Bai-hao as child Guo-jian
- Cosmos Lin as Nan Yue-li 南月禮
  - Song Ting-yi as child Yue-li
- Yang Kuei-mei as Zhou Hui-min 周慧敏
- Wu Nien-hsuan as Ma Wei-hai 馬威海
- Li Jia-yu s Xia Ou 夏鷗
- Akio Chen as Xia Shou-fu 夏守富
- Judy Liu as 4th sister Ma 馬四姐
- Alice Huang as Xu Feng-yin 徐鳳音

=== Supporting cast ===
- Cheng Ping-Chun as Bi Yong-wang 畢永望
- Liu Han-qiang as Uncle Wu 午叔
- Wu Xin-yun as Ma Yu-shan 馬玉姍
- Liao Wei-bo as Xia Zhi 夏志
- Yu Cheng-hsin as Ah Jiong 阿冏
- Chris Chen as Kang You-di 康又迪
  - Chen Yu-xiang as young You-di
- Wu Chia-Shan as Grandma Kang 康奶奶
- Kuo Tzu-chien as Guo Fu-cheng 郭富城
- Angel Hong as Zhuo Zi-mei 卓子玫
- Jack Lee as Mai Qing-zhe 麥青哲
- Ray Fan as Lu Yan-qin 呂燕琴

=== Guest actors ===
- Michael Tao as Director Tang 唐董
- Josh Lin as Master Da Long 大隆師傅
- Jason Chan as Guo-jian's assistant
- Leo Lee as Allen (Yue-li's ex-boyfriend)
- Claire Yen as Amy (Allen's fiancé)
- Eunice Han as Ah Ru 阿如
- Chiu Yi-Feng as manager
- Mu Qi as shop assistant
- Joyce Godenzi as Hui-min's friend
- Yen Yung Lie as Mr. Wu 吳先生
- Crowd Lu as Guo Xue-fu 郭學福 (Fu-cheng's son)

== Soundtrack ==
- Self-complacement 愛情怎麼了嗎 by Crowd Lu
- Vulnerability 如果我沒有傷口 by Jolin Tsai
- Song of Summer 夏天的歌 by Crowd Lu
- Imperfect Rainbow 殘缺的彩虹 by Cheer Chen
- Bromance 華生 by Cheer Chen
- Perfect Time 下次見 by Vast & Hazy
- Happiness Awaits 預告幸福 by Alina Cheng
- You Make the Sun Shine 陽光燦爛的原因 by Alina Cheng

== Broadcast ==
Network	Country	Airing Date	Timeslot
TTV Main Channel	Taiwan	5 May 2019	Sunday 22:00-23:30
Vidol	Taiwan	5 May 2019	Sunday 23:30
iQiyi	Taiwan	6 May 2019	Sunday 00:00
Line TV	Taiwan	6 May 2019	Sunday 00:00
SET Metro	Taiwan	11 May 2019	Saturday 22:00-23:30
Jia Le Channel	Singapore	28 October 2019	Monday to Thursday 22:00 - 23:00
Mediacorp Channel 8	Singapore	19 August 2020	Monday to Friday 23:00 - 00:00
UNTV	Philippines	This 2021	TBA

== Ratings ==
Taiwan TTV Main Channel First Broadcast Rating (Nielsen Corporation)
Air Date	Episode	Episode Title	Average Ratings	Rank
5 May 2019	1	If life can repeat itself, if it really snows in the southern lands 如果人生可以打掉重練，如果南國真的下了雪	1.58	1
12 May 2019	2	Return to the original place 回到最初的地方	1.41	1
19 May 2019	3	Stay or leave 留下還是離去	1.39	1
26 May 2019	4	A marriage with a time limit 有期限的婚姻	1.20	1
2 June 2019	5	Waiting for hope 等待的希望	1.42	1
9 June 2019	6	The familiar feeling 曾經的熟悉	1.47	1
16 June 2019	7	Forgive yourself 原諒自己	1.48	1
23 June 2019	8	The promise to give you happiness 保證給妳幸福	1.31	1
30 June 2019	9	Follow your heart 跟隨自己的心	1.03	1
7 July 2019	10	Marriage as the premise of starting a relationship 以結婚為前提交往	1.49	1
14 July 2019	11	辛苦付諸東流	1.38	1
21 July 2019	12	日益加深的在意	1.13	1
28 July 2019	13	將壓力放在心裡	1.25	1
4 August 2019	14	找回笑容	1.31	1
11 August 2019	15	努力終得結果	1.49	1
18 August 2019	16	不同世界的人	1.25	1
25 August 2019	17	埋藏多年的驚人秘密	1.65	1
1 September 2019	18	最後的承諾	1.50	2
Average ratings			1.37	

Notes:
1. Competing dramas on rival channels airing at the same time slot were:
  - CTS - Best Interest
  - CTV - The Next Season 2, Golden Melody
  - FTV - Music of Taiwan
  - EBC - Hot Door Night, Half and Half
2. The data was investigated by AGB Nielsen, and the audience surveyed was viewers over four years old watching TV.
