= Golden Horse Award for Best New Performer =

Taiwanese film award

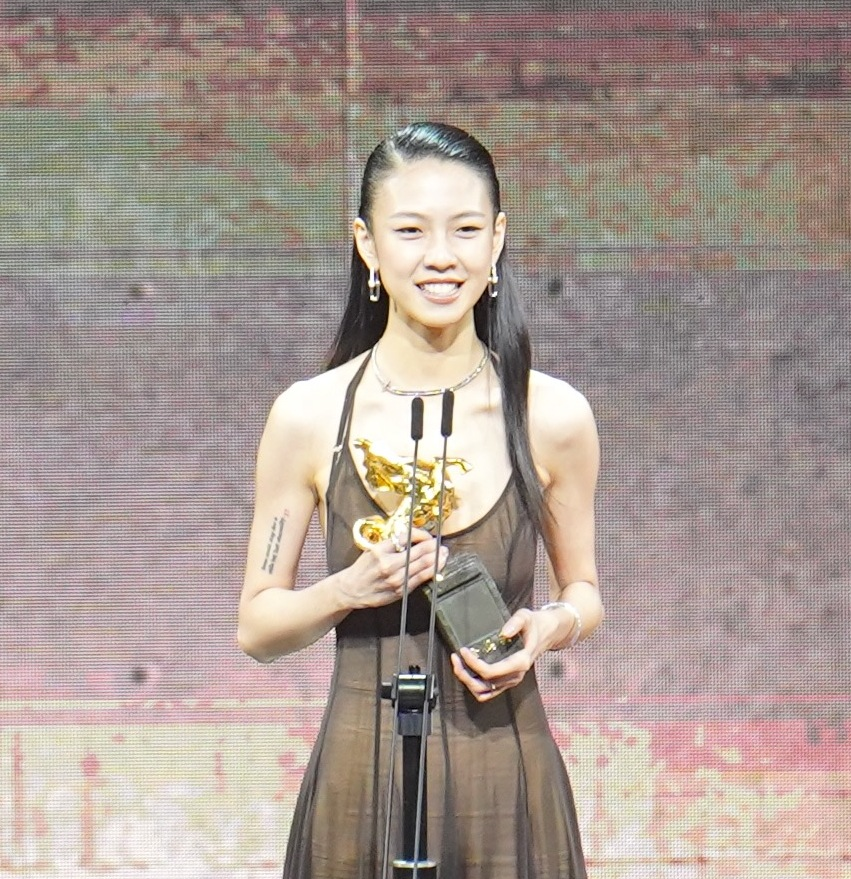
- The 2025 recipient: Ma Shih-Yuan
- Awarded for: Best New Performer in a Motion Picture
- Country: Taiwan
- Presented by: Taipei Golden Horse Film Festival Executive Committee
- First award: 2000
- Currently held by: Ma Shih-yuan for Left-Handed Girl (2025)
- Website: goldenhorse.org.tw

The Golden Horse Award for Best New Performer (Chinese: 金馬獎最佳新演員) has been presented annually at Taiwan's Golden Horse Film Awards since 2000.

== Winners and nominees ==
indicates the winner

=== 2000s ===
Year	Recipient(s)	Film	Original title
2000 (37th)	Yiu Yuet-ming	Little Cheung	細路祥
2000 (37th)	Huang Yao-nung	Lament of The Sand River	沙河悲歌
2000 (37th)	Debbie Tam	Moving on Without a Man	無人駕駛
2000 (37th)	Yen Mu-tsuen	Bundled	我叫阿銘啦
2001 (38th)	Qin Hailu	Durian Durian	榴槤飄飄
2001 (38th)	Li Bin	Beijing Bicycle	十七歲的單車
2001 (38th)	Lo Wai-ying	Gimme Gimme	愛上我吧
2001 (38th)	Zeny Kwok	Merry-Go-Round	初戀拿喳麵
2002 (39th)	Karena Lam	July Rhapsody	男人四十
2002 (39th)	Kao Meng-chieh	The Best of Times	美麗時光
2002 (39th)	Wong You-nam	Hollywood Hong Kong	香港有個荷里活
2002 (39th)	Erica Lam	How's Life	好郁
2003 (40th)	Megan Zheng	Homerun	跑吧！孩子
2003 (40th)	Wang Baoqiang	Blind Shaft	盲井
2003 (40th)	Chang Chieh	The Missing	不見
2004 (41st)	Hung Hao-hsuan	Bear Hug	擁抱大白熊
2004 (41st)	Tony Yang	Formula 17	十七歲的天空
2004 (41st)	James Chen	Splendid Float	豔光四射歌舞團
2004 (41st)	Tian Yuan	Butterfly	蝴蝶
2005 (42nd)	Jay Chou	Initial D	頭文字D
2005 (42nd)	Isabella Leong	Bug Me Not!	蟲不知
2005 (42nd)	Race Wong	Ab-normal Beauty	死亡寫真
2005 (42nd)	Megan Lai	How's Life	生命狂想曲
2006 (43rd)	Ray Chang	Eternal Summer	盛夏光年
2006 (43rd)	Matt Wu	The Touch of Fate	指尖的重量
2006 (43rd)	Ian Gouw	After This Our Exile	父子
2006 (43rd)	Joseph Chang	Eternal Summer	盛夏光年
2007 (44th)	Tang Wei	Lust, Caution	色，戒
2007 (44th)	Eddie Peng	My DNA Says I Love You	基因決定我愛你
2007 (44th)	Enno Cheng	Summer's Tail	夏天的尾巴
2007 (44th)	Joel Lok	The Home Song Stories	意
2008 (45th)	Suming	Hopscotch	跳格子
2008 (45th)	Lin Chung-jen	Cape No. 7	海角七號
2008 (45th)	Chie Tanaka	Cape No. 7	海角七號
2008 (45th)	Pan Chin-yu	Orz Boyz!	囧男孩
2009 (46th)	Yu Shaoqun	Forever Enthralled	梅蘭芳
2009 (46th)	Chen Wen-pin	Cannot Live Without You	不能沒有你
2009 (46th)	Her Sy-huoy	Yang Yang	陽陽
2009 (46th)	Michelle Chen	Hear Me	聽說

=== 2010s ===
Year	Recipient(s)	Film	Original title
2010 (47th)	Lee Chien-na	Juliets	茱麗葉
2010 (47th)	Winnie Chang	7 Days in Heaven	父後七日
2010 (47th)	Lee Yi-chieh	When Love Comes	當愛來的時候
2010 (47th)	Bi Xiao-hai	The Fourth Portrait	第四張畫
2011 (48th)	Kai Ko	You Are the Apple of My Eye	那些年，我們一起追的女孩
2011 (48th)	Nolay Piho	Warriors of the Rainbow: Seediq Bale	賽德克·巴萊
2011 (48th)	Bokeh Kosang	Warriors of the Rainbow: Seediq Bale	賽德克·巴萊
2011 (48th)	Lin Yuan-jie	Warriors of the Rainbow: Seediq Bale	賽德克·巴萊
2012 (49th)	Qi Xi	Mystery	浮城謎事
2012 (49th)	Huang Pei-jia	Cha Cha for Twins	寶米恰恰
2012 (49th)	Kuo Chun-mei	Flying Dragon, Dancing Phoenix	龍飛鳳舞
2012 (49th)	Zhang Zixuan	Love Is Not Blind	失戀33天
2012 (49th)	Lin Hui-min	Starry Starry Night	星空
2013 (50th)	Kuo Shu-yao	Step Back to Glory	志氣
2013 (50th)	Koh Jia Ler	Ilo Ilo	爸媽不在家
2013 (50th)	Yang Liang-yu	A Time in Quchi	暑假作業
2013 (50th)	Huang Shao-yang	Together	甜·秘密
2013 (50th)	Dong Zijian	Young Style	青春派
2014 (51st)	Zhang Lei	Blind Massage	推拿
2014 (51st)	Hsu Wei-ning	Design 7 Love	相愛的七種設計
2014 (51st)	Zhang Huiwen	Coming Home	歸來
2014 (51st)	Tsao Yu-ning	Kano	
2014 (51st)	Wei Han-ting	Meeting Dr. Sun	行動代號：孫中山
2015 (52nd)	Lee Hong-chi	Thanatos, Drunk	醉.生夢死
2015 (52nd)	Jessie Li	Port of Call	踏血尋梅
2015 (52nd)	Michael Ning	Port of Call	踏血尋梅
2015 (52nd)	Cecilia So	She Remembers, He Forgets	哪一天我們會飛
2015 (52nd)	Ado' Kaliting Pacidal	Panay	太陽的孩子
2016 (53rd)	Kong Weiyi	The Summer Is Gone	八月
2016 (53rd)	Tony Wu	Weeds on Fire	點五步
2016 (53rd)	Buya Watan	Hang in There, Kids!	只要我長大
2016 (53rd)	Annie Chen	White Lies, Black Lies	失控謊言
2016 (53rd)	Kalsang Jinpa	Soul on a String	皮繩上的魂
2017 (54th)	Rima Zeidan	Missing Johnny	強尼．凱克
2017 (54th)	Kent Tsai	All Because of Love	痴情男子漢
2017 (54th)	Elane Zhong	Youth	芳華
2017 (54th)	Zhang Aoyue	The Hidden Sword	刀背藏身
2017 (54th)	Wu Nien-hsuan	The Tag-Along 2	紅衣小女孩 2
2018 (55th)	Si Pangoyod	Long Time No Sea	只有大海知道
2018 (55th)	Huang Sheng-chiu	Dear Ex	誰先愛上他的
2018 (55th)	Hsieh Chang-ying	Cities of Last Things	幸福城市
2018 (55th)	Chang Tsai-hsing	Gatao 2: Rise of the King	角頭2：王者再起
2018 (55th)	Fu Meng-po	Father to Son	范保德
2019 (56th)	Fandy Fan	We Are Champions	下半場
2019 (56th)	Yuan Teng	The Paradise	樂園
2019 (56th)	Money Cai	Heavy Craving	大餓
2019 (56th)	Oscar Chiu	The Teacher	我的靈魂是愛做的
2019 (56th)	Tseng Jing-hua	Detention	返校

=== 2020s ===
Year	Recipient(s)	Film	Original title	Ref.
2020 (57th)	Buffy Chen	The Silent Forest	無聲	
2020 (57th)	Wu Yi-chung	Dear Orange	大吉大利 闔家平安	
2020 (57th)	Terrance Lau	Beyond the Dream	幻愛	
2020 (57th)	Heyo	The Way We Keep Dancing	狂舞派3	
2020 (57th)	Chen Hao-sen	Your Name Engraved Herein	刻在你心底的名字	
2021 (58th)	Caitlin Fang	American Girl	美国女孩	
2021 (58th)	Eve Ai	I Missed You	我没有谈的那场恋爱	
2021 (58th)	Lin Ju	Raydio	兜兜风	
2021 (58th)	Moon Lee	Terrorizers	青春弑恋	
2021 (58th)	Devin Pan	Goddamned Asura	该死的阿修罗	
2022 (59th)	Hu Jhih-ciang	Coo-Coo 043	一家子儿咕咕叫	
2022 (59th)	Huang Sin-ting	Incantation	咒	
2022 (59th)	Yukan Losing	Gaga	哈勇家	
2022 (59th)	Eric Chou	My Best Friend's Breakfast	我吃了那男孩一整年的早餐	
2022 (59th)	Sahal Zaman	The Sunny Side of the Street	白日青春	
2023 (60th)	Yoyo Tse	Fly Me to the Moon	但願人長久	
2023 (60th)	Tan Kim-wang	Abang Adik	富都青年	
2023 (60th)	Daniel Hong	Miss Shampoo	請問，還有哪裡需要加強	
2023 (60th)	Travis Hu	A Boy and a Girl	少男少女	
2023 (60th)	Yeh Hsiao-fei	Who'll Stop the Rain	青春並不溫柔	
2024 (61st)	Feifei Cheng	BIG		
2024 (61st)	Yu Aier	Some Rain Must Fall	空房間裡的女人	
2024 (61st)	Tang Yung-hsu	Salli	莎莉	
2024 (61st)	Lin Cheng-hsun	Intimate Encounter	優雅的相遇	
2024 (61st)	Alisia Liang	The Chronicles of Libidoists	破浪男女	
2025 (62nd)	Ma Shih-Yuan	Left-Handed Girl	左撇子女孩	
2025 (62nd)	Rosen	Marching Boys	進行曲	
2025 (62nd)	Jimmy Liu	Blind Love	失明	
2025 (62nd)	Jayden Cheung	Queerpanorama	眾生相	
2025 (62nd)	Lin Yi-ting	A Dance With Rainbows	恨女的逆襲	

== See also ==
- Blue Dragon Film Award for Best New Actor
- Blue Dragon Film Award for Best New Actress
- César Award for Best Female Revelation
- César Award for Best Male Revelation
- Gotham Independent Film Award for Breakthrough Performer
- Goya Award for Best New Actor
- Goya Award for Best New Actress
- Independent Spirit Award for Best Breakthrough Performance
