= Wu Nien-hsuan =

Taiwanese actor and television host

- 吳念軒
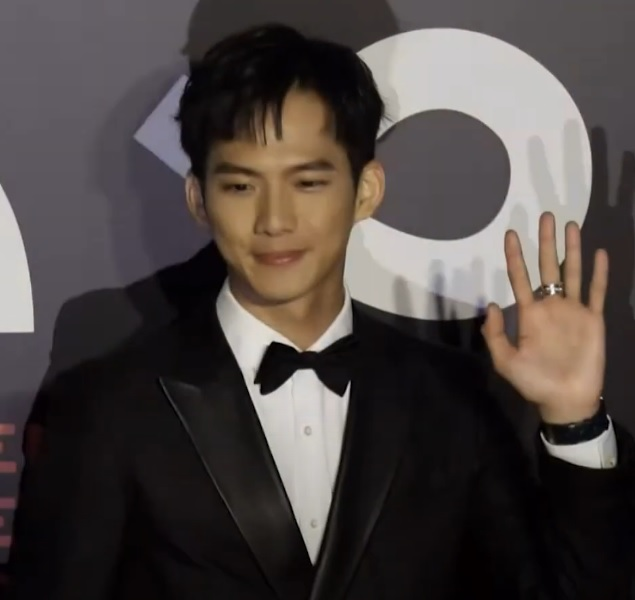
- Wu at the 59th Golden Horse Awards in November 2022
- Born: 10 May 1995 (age 31); Taoyuan, Taiwan
- Education: Tamkang University (BS)
- Occupations: Actor; television host
- Years active: 2016–present

Chinese name
- Traditional Chinese: 吳念軒
- Simplified Chinese: 吴念轩
- Hanyu Pinyin: Wú Niànxuān
- Hokkien POJ: Ngô͘ Liām-hian

Wu Nien-hsuan (Chinese: 吳念軒; Pe̍h-ōe-jī: Ngô͘ Liām-hian; born 10 May 1995) is a Taiwanese actor and television host. He was nominated for a Golden Horse Award and a Golden Bell Award for his roles in the film The Tag-Along 2 (2017) and the television series Age of Rebellion (2018), respectively.

== Life and career ==
Wu was born on 10 May 1995. He studied statistics at Tamkang University, and in 2014 he was chosen as one of twenty contestants for the Top Star project organized by Enjoy Entertainment Company. After near to two years of training, Wu debuted as the host of travel adventure show, The Burning Youth Tours, which airs weekly on SET Taiwan.

In 2016, Wu was selected out of 100 hopefuls to play the role of a spirit medium for the Tiger Lord in horror film The Tag-Along 2. The film was released on August 25, 2017. The film was a commercial success, and the performances of the cast were well received. On August 26, 2017, it was announced that Wu will appear in Age Of Rebellion, a television series directed and produced by Peter Ho, with filming beginning in September 2017.

== Filmography ==
=== Film ===
Year	English title	Original title	Role	Notes
2017	The Tag-Along 2	紅衣小女孩2	Lin Chun-kai (Tiger Lord)	

=== Television series ===
Year	English title	Original title	Role	Notes
2017	Age Of Rebellion	翻牆的記憶	K Wang Wei-chieh	
2019	Back to Home	月村歡迎你	Ma Wei-hai	

=== Variety show ===
Year	English title	Original title	Network	Notes
2016–present	The Burning Youth Tours	青春好7淘	SET Taiwan	Host

=== Music video appearances ===
Year	Artist	Song title
2017	Janice Yan	"Grim Reaper"

== Awards and nominations ==
Year	Award	Category	Nominated work	Result
2017	54th Golden Horse Awards	Best New Performer	The Tag-Along 2	Nominated
2018	53rd Golden Bell Awards	Best Supporting Actor	Age of Rebellion	Nominated
2019	23rd Asian Television Awards	Best Supporting Actor	Age of Rebellion	Nominated
2020	22nd Taipei Film Awards	Best Actor	Boluomi	Nominated
