= The Tenants Downstairs =

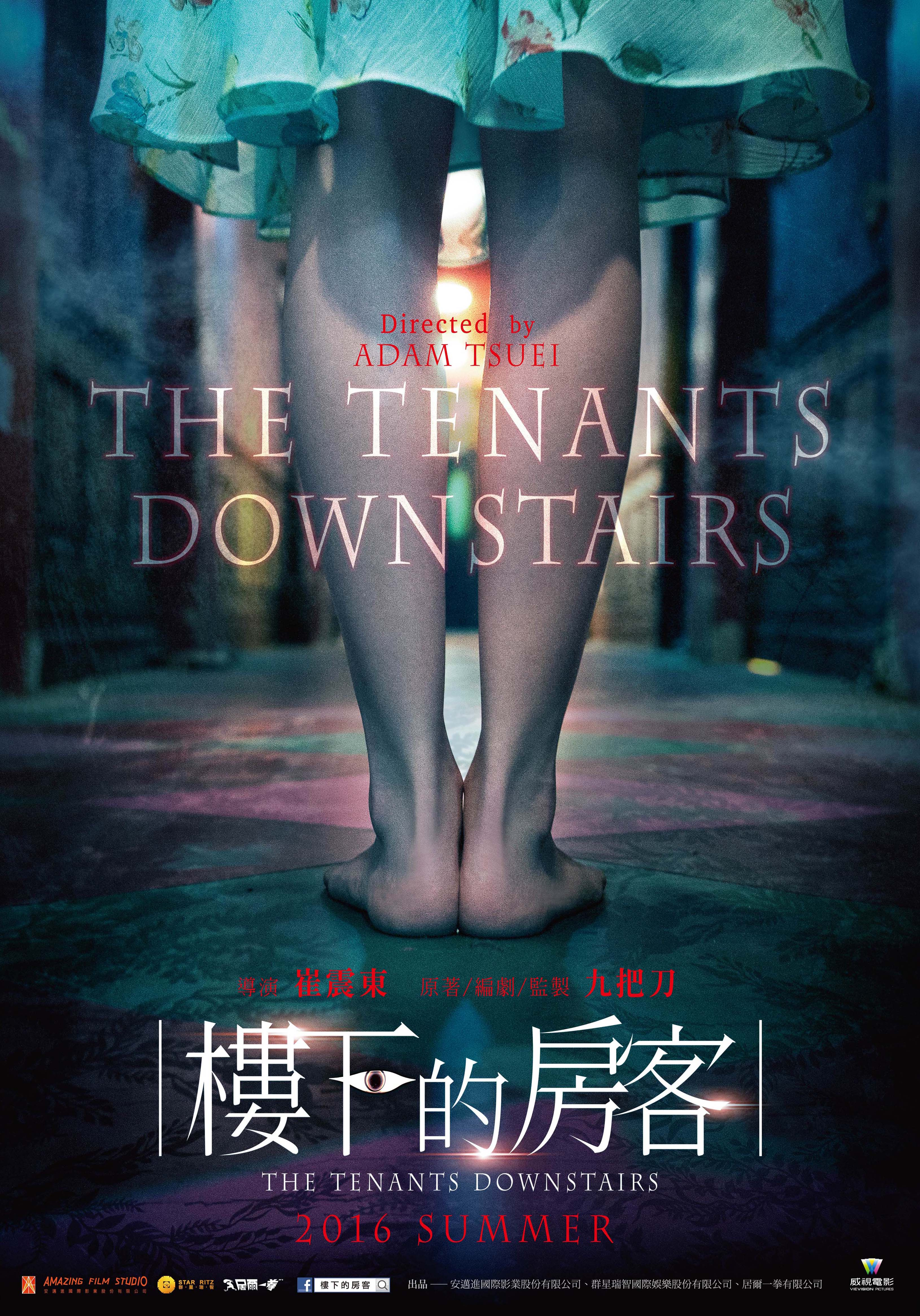
- Hong Kong film poster
- Traditional Chinese: 樓下的房客
- Simplified Chinese: 楼下的房客
- Hanyu Pinyin: Lóu Xià De Fáng Kè
- Jyutping: Lau4 Haa6 Dik1 Fong4 Haak3
- Directed by: Adam Tsuei
- Written by: Giddens Ko
- Based on: The Tenants Downstairs by Giddens Ko
- Produced by: Angie Chai; Liao Chin-feng
- Starring: Simon Yam; Lee Kang-sheng; Kaiser Chuang; Ivy Shao; Sophia Li; Yu An-shun; Hou Yan-xi; Bernard; Angel Ho
- Cinematography: Jimmy Yu
- Edited by: Ian Lin
- Music by: Chris Hou; Ivan Linn
- Production companies: Amazing Film Studio; Star Ritz International Entertainment; Edko Films; CMC Entertainment; Vie Vision Pictures; Mm2 Entertainment
- Release date: 12 August 2016 (Taiwan)
- Running time: 120 minutes
- Country: Taiwan
- Language: Mandarin
- Budget: NT$150 million

The Tenants Downstairs is a 2016 Taiwanese black comedy-horror film based on Taiwanese writer Giddens Ko's novel of the same name. The film is written by Ko and also presented, produced and directed by Adam Tsuei and stars Simon Yam, Lee Kang-sheng, Kaiser Chuang, Ivy Shao and Sophia Li. Filming for The Tenants Downstairs began in October 2015 and ended in November 2015 and was released on 12 August 2016.

== Plot ==
A police interrogator questions a man inside an interrogation room. The man claims that he inherited a building with studio apartments from a distant relative, so he became the landlord of the building, renting the apartments out to tenants. The Landlord's penthouse apartment is equipped with screens that allow the Landlord to see inside each apartment, which all have hidden cameras. His tenants include divorcee Mr. Wang Ming-kai and his fourth-grade daughter; Ms. Chen Min-hui, an office worker who uses her body for financial gain and advantages in the workplace; Mr. Chang Kuo-sheng, a physical education teacher who enjoys peeping on his neighbors and is infatuated with Ms. Chen; Bo-yan, a geeky college student obsessed with the idea of having superpowers; and a gay couple, Kuo Li and Ling Hu. The Landlord also claims that a mysterious woman named Ying-ru lives in the apartment directly under his penthouse; however, the police interrogator states that there is no record of anyone named Ying-ru having lived there.

The Landlord spies on his tenants closely, and figures out everyone's routine. However, he finds that Ying-ru has no discernible routine. He lets himself into Ying-ru's apartment to investigate while she is out, but Ying-ru returns unexpectedly, with a man. The Landlord hides, and watches as Ying-ru drugs the man with poisoned tea, then ties him up in the bathtub. However, the Landlord does not alert the authorities, and over the course of several days, Ying-ru tortures the man to death. A few days later, Ying-ru drags a bound woman back to her apartment in a suitcase, and also tortures her to death in her bathtub. The Landlord confronts Ying-ru, who says that she cannot accept a life without change or possibility. Therefore, she is determined to avoid a mundane life, and will shatter whatever boundaries are in her way. The Landlord takes her words to heart, and decides to shatter his tenants' routine lives.

The Landlord tricks Bo-yan into thinking he has teleportation powers, manipulates Kuo Li and Ling Hu into believing the other is being unfaithful, allows Mr. Chang to break into Ms. Chen's room and have sex with her, and adds an aphrodisiac to Mr. Wang's mosquito coil to give him lustful feelings towards his daughter. The Landlord's antics eventually result in the deaths of Mr. Wang and Ling Hu.

The police interrogator points out places where the Landlord's story does not match the facts. Ms. Chen is actually married to Mr. Wang; Kuo Li and Ling Hu are uncle and nephew, not lovers; Mr. Chang is a gay university professor and thus could not be infatuated with Ms. Chen; and Bo-yan is a model student and is not obsessed with superpowers.

The Landlord's interrogation is then interrupted by a police officer, who has found the Landlord's true identity. The Landlord used to be a police officer named Chang Chia-chun, and had participated in an investigation against Huang Si-lang, a man who had abducted and tortured schoolgirls to death—including Chang's daughter Chang Ying-ru. Huang had avoided serious punishment by claiming insanity. Chang had volunteered to go undercover in the asylum where Huang was being kept, in order to extract a confession, but Chang's superior officer died unexpectedly, which meant no one knew Chang was undercover in the asylum. Chang underwent forced treatments and tortures, which broke his mind. In the asylum, Huang gave Chang the keys to the building where he had killed the schoolgirls, including Chang's daughter, and then committed suicide. After Chang was released, he left the police force, went to the building, and began accepting tenants there. He also imagined his daughter Ying-ru as one of the tenants, and himself as Ying-ru, he tracked down the people who had forcibly treated him in the asylum, and tortured them to death one by one.

== Cast ==
- Simon Yam as Chang Chia-chun (張家俊), a landlord who likes spying his tenants. Chang was an undercover police officer who entered an asylum to arrest serial killer Huang Si-lang but was tortured as his superior officer became a vegetable, unable to prove his identity as a police officer. Chang was released from the asylum after his wife found his diary, but his personality have become twisted and seeks revenge on those who have abused him.
- Lee Kang-sheng as Kuo Li (郭力), a homosexual tenant as described by Chang, while in actuality, Kuo is a cancer sufferer.
- Kaiser Chuang as Chang Kuo-sheng (張國生), a tenant who is a lusty gymnastics teacher with a criminal record of domestic violence and enjoys spying on others and drinking expired milk as described by Chang, while in actuality, Chang is a college professor who is homosexual.
- Ivy Shao as Chang Ying-ru (張穎如), Chang's daughter who was murdered by serial killer Huang Si-lang. The Ying-ru in the story as Chang described to the police interrogator is actually himself.
- Sophia Li as Chen Min-hui (陳敏慧), one of the tenants who is an office lady often engaging in infidelity as described by Chang, while in actuality, Chen is the wife of Wang Ming-kai and mother of Wang Yun-ko.
- Yu An-shun as Wang Ming-kai (王名凱), a divorced tenants who has sexual fantasies about his daughter as described by Chang, while in actuality, Wang is married to Chen Min-hui and the father of Wang Yun-ko in a happy family of three.
- Hou Yan-xi as Bo-yan (柏彥), one of the tenants who is a useless college student who believes the existence of teleportation when Chang puts him unconscious with sleeping pills and moves him to a different location as described by Chang. In actuality, Bo-yan is a hard-working medical student who is also homosexual.
- Bernard Sen as Ling Hu (令狐), a homosexual tenant who is Kuo Li's boyfriend as described by Chang, while in actuality, Ling is Kuo's nephew who would occasionally visit his uncle and take care of him.
- Angel Ho as Wang Yun-ko (王芸可), one of the tenants who is Wang Ming-kai's daughter as described by Chang, while in actuality, Wang is indeed Wang Min-kai's daughter but is also Chen Min-hui's daughter.
- Akio Chen as Huang Si-lang (黃四郎), the previous owner of the apartment as described by Chang, while in actuality, Huang is a serial killer who Chang was determined to arrest in the past. Huang rescued Chang from the asylum and hanged himself afterwards.
- Feng Kai as a police officer who interrogates the landlord.
- Kurt Chou as a doctor in the asylum who once raped Chang Chia-chun. He was later tortured to death by Chang and became his first victim.
- Kitamura Toyoharu as Min-hui's superior who has a relationship with her.
- Alex Ko as a police officer.
- Don Wong as Officer Chen (陳警官)
- Chang Chiong-chi as Officer Chen's wife.
- Shen Meng-sheng as an old man.
- Ryan Kuo as a police officer.
- Tu Shih-mei as an asylum staff who forced Chang to eat. She was later abducted by Chang to the apartment where he forced her to drink detergent the same way she forced him to eat and dies as a result, becoming Chang's second victim.

== Production ==
The cast of the film was announced on 18 September 2015. Simon Yam plays Chang Chia-chun, the landlord, Lee Kang-sheng plays Kuo Li, the professor, and Shao Yu-wei plays Ying-ru, the lead actress. On 7 October, additional cast members were announced, Kaiser Chuang plays Chang Kuo-sheng, Sophia Li plays Chen, Yu An-shun plays Wang Ming-kai, Hou Yan-xi plays Bo-yan, Angel Ho plays the daughter of Wang, Bernard Sen plays Ling Hu and Kurt Chou plays the visitor of Ying-ru.

== Reception ==
On the review aggregator website Rotten Tomatoes, 56% of 9 critics' reviews are positive.

== See also ==
- Sliver, 1993 American film with a similar premise
