= Suburban Birds =

- Chinese: 郊区的鸟
- Directed by: Qiu Sheng
- Written by: Qiu Sheng
- Starring: Mason Lee; Gong Zihan; Huang Lu
- Cinematography: Xu Ranjun
- Edited by: Liao Qiangsong; Jin Di
- Music by: Xiaohe
- Production companies: A Beijing Transcend Pictures Entertainment; Quasar Films; Cforce Pictures; Beijing Yoshow Films; Three Monkeys Films Shanghai; Beijing Chase Pictures; Kiframe Studio
- Distributed by: Luxbox (international); Flash Forward Entertainment (international); Cinema Guild (U.S.)
- Release dates: April 2018 (Locarno); April 6, 2019
- Running time: 118 minutes
- Country: China
- Languages: Mandarin; Hangzhou dialect

Suburban Birds (Chinese: 郊区的鸟; pinyin: Jiāo qū de niǎo) is a 2018 Chinese drama film by Qiu Sheng.

== Plot ==
The film tells two separate but related stories. Both are set in Hangzhou, and both center on a character named Xia Hao, but whether these are the same character is left ambiguous. The first is about a group of engineers who survey the elevation in a suburb, and the second is about a group of child friends and ends in the disappearance of most of the children. While investigating the collapse of an apartment building, the older Xia Hao meets and later begins a relationship with a woman named Swallow. Following a dream by one engineer, a water leak in a tunnel is investigated as a possible cause of subsidence. The group of children look for birds and discuss who they like, after which Fang Tin and Foxy compete for the younger Xia Hao's attention. After Fatty stops attending school, the children search for him, leading many of them to disappear.

== Cast ==
- Mason Lee as Xia Hao
- Gong Zihan as Xia Hao
- Huang Lu as Swallow
- Qian Xuanyi as Foxy
- Xu Shuo as Fang Tin
- Chen Zhihao as Coal
- Chen Yihao as Fatty
- Xu Chenghui as Old Timer
- Xiao Xiao as Han
- Deng Jing as Ant
- Wang Xinyu as Officer Jiang

== Production ==
Suburban Birds was written and directed by Qiu Sheng, produced by Patrick Mao Huang, Chen Jingsu, and Zhang Zhaowei, and co-produced by Wuyi, Liu Xiang, and Han Tian, with director of photography Xu Ranjun, art direction by Yu Ziyang, music by Xiaohe, and cinematography by Xu Ranjun.

The production companies for Suburban Birds are A Beijing Transcend Pictures Entertainment, Quasar Films, Cforce Pictures, Beijing Yoshow Films, Three Monkeys Films, Shanghai, Beijing Chase Pictures, Kiframe Studio, and Chan Pictures. It is distributed internationally by Flash Forward Entertainment and Luxbox, and in North America by Cinema Guild.

=== Development ===
Qiu has states that the film was a representation of Hangzhou's rapid development, which led it to become unrecognizable, along with the central theme of memory and how land and physical space become reflections of memory. The film was influenced by the collapse of Xinjian Primary School in the 2008 Sichuan earthquake.

The film is in Mandarin and the Hangzhou dialect.

== Release ==
Suburban Birds was approved by the Chinese government and shown at Locarno Film Festival in April 2018. However, a new law came into effect soon after the film's release which required filmmakers to get a certificate to be able to show their films abroad, delaying its American premiere until April 6, 2019.

== Reception ==
Suburban Birds has received generally positive reviews, holding a rating of 83% based on 19 critics on Rotten Tomatoes and a score of 72 out of 100 based on 7 critics on Metacritic. Critics largely described the film as defying easy understanding, visually striking, with compelling storytelling. Some criticism of the film characterized it as unclear or overly self-conscious.

The film had a gross revenue of CN¥ 490,000 in China and $10,997 internationally.
