= Mason Lee =

Taiwanese-American actor

- 李淳
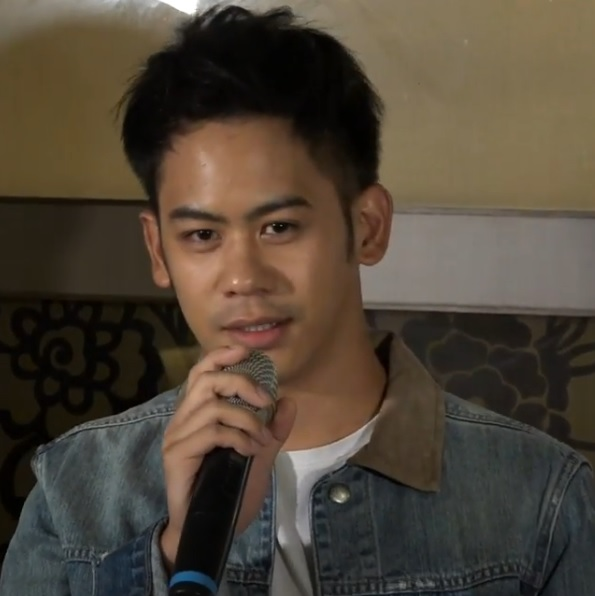
- Lee in 2018
- Born: May 30, 1990 (age 35); United States
- Other names: Lee Chun; Li Chun
- Education: New York University (BFA)
- Occupation: Actor
- Years active: 1993–present
- Spouse: Silver Chiu (m. 2022)
- Parent(s): Ang Lee; Jane Lin

Chinese name
- Chinese: 李淳
- Hanyu Pinyin: Lǐ Chún

Mason Lee (Chinese: 李淳; born May 30, 1990) is a Taiwanese-American actor. He is the son of director Ang Lee. Outside of Asia, he is best known for playing the role of Teddy in The Hangover Part II.

== Early life and education ==
Lee was born in the United States in 1990. He went to college at New York University, where he graduated with a bachelor's degree in drama and theater.

== Filmography ==
=== Film ===
Year	English title	Mandarin title	Role	Notes
1993	The Wedding Banquet	囍宴	Baby	
2001	Chosen	聖子	Passenger holy child	
2011	The Hangover Part II	醉後大丈夫2	Teddy	
2014	Lucy	露西	Hotel Doorman	
2014	Dream Flight	想飛	Division Leader	
2015	Where the Wind Settles	風中家族	Sheng Feng-hsien	
2015	Made in Taiwan	台灣製造	Guido	
2016	Billy Lynn's Long Halftime Walk	比利·林恩的中場戰事	Foo	
2016	Super Express	超級快遞	Ryan	
2017	Duckweed	乘风破浪	Thief	
2017	The Missing	绑架者	Xiao K	
2017	Who Killed Cock Robin	目擊者	Chou Cheng-wei (A-wei)	
2017	Legend of the Demon Cat	妖猫传	The Chamberlain	
2017	Dead Pigs	多樂路	Wang Zhen	
2018	Carpool	搭便車	Passenger	
2018	Suburban Birds	郊区的鸟	Xiahao	
2019	Dead Pigs	海上浮城	Wang Zhen	
2019	Addicts	獸	Zhao Zhen	
2019	Stand by Me	陪你很久很久	Jiu Bing	
2021	Limbo	智齒	Yam Hoi	
2021	Keep in mind: Father’s Cinema	父親的電影院	son	
2021	The Opera House	武動天地	Tien Yo	
2022	Reclaim	一家之主	Lee Guanting	
2023	Love in Taipei	台北愛船		

=== Television series ===
Year	English title	Mandarin title	Role	Network	Notes
2015	The End Of Love	公視人生劇展 — 愛情的盡頭	Kao Shao-wei	PTS	
2016	Fresh Off the Boat	菜鳥新移民 — 返鄉探親記	Director	ABC	1 Episode
2022	The Moon In The Cave	洞裡的月亮	季蔚然	CTV	
2022	On Marriage	你的婚姻不是你的婚姻－恭請光臨曾賈府喜事		PTS	
TBA	Would You Like a Cup of Coffee?	歡迎光臨 二代咖啡			

=== Music video appearances ===
Year	Vocal	English title	Mandarin title	Notes
2018	Lala Hsu	From Now On	到此為止	
2019	Ivy Shao	Drizzle	微雨	
2020	Eric Chou	I’m Happy	我很快樂	

== Theater ==
Year	English title	Mandarin title	Role	Network	Notes
2018	2923	2923	Prisoner	Dear Loneliness	

== Awards and nominations ==
Year	Award	Category	Nominated work	Result
2015	50th Golden Bell Awards	Best Supporting Actor in a Miniseries or Television Film	The End Of Love	Nominated
2017	54th Golden Horse Awards	Best Supporting Actor	Who Killed Cock Robin	Nominated
2022	59th Golden Horse Awards	Best Supporting Actor	Limbo	Nominated
