= 54th Golden Horse Awards =

2017 Taiwanese film awards ceremony

- Poster
- Date: November 25, 2017
- Site: Sun Yat-sen Memorial Hall, Taipei, Taiwan
- Hosted by: Matilda Tao
- Preshow hosts: Yang Chien-pei; Ethan Liu
- Organized by: Taipei Golden Horse Film Festival Executive Committee

Highlights
- Best Feature Film: The Bold, the Corrupt, and the Beautiful
- Best Director: Vivian Qu; Angels Wear White
- Best Actor: Tu Men; Old Beast
- Best Actress: Kara Hui; The Bold, the Corrupt, and the Beautiful
- Most awards: The Great Buddha + (5)
- Most nominations: The Great Buddha + (10)

Television in Taiwan
- Network: TTV

The 54th Golden Horse Awards (Chinese: 第54屆金馬獎) took place on November 25, 2017 at the Sun Yat-sen Memorial Hall in Taipei, Taiwan. Organized by the Taipei Golden Horse Film Festival Executive Committee, the awards honored the best in Chinese-language films of 2016 and 2017. The ceremony was televised by TTV.

== Winners and nominees ==
Winners are listed first, highlighted in boldface.

**Best Feature Film**: **The Bold, the Corrupt, and the Beautiful**; Free and Easy; The Great Buddha +; Love Education; Angels Wear White	**Best Documentary**: **Inmates**; Mama; Plastic China; Condemned Practice Mode; Looking For?
**Best Animation Feature**: **Have a Nice Day**; The Guardian; Barkley	**Best Live Action Short Film**: **Babes’ Not Alone**; The Night of Arzu; Blind Mouth; Love After Time; The Dress on Her
**Best Animated Short Film**: **Losing Sight of a Longed Place**; Fundamental; St(r)ay; Revelation – The City of Haze; Stories About Him	**Best Director**: **Vivian Qu — Angels Wear White**; Geng Jun — Free and Easy; Sylvia Chang — Love Education; Ann Hui — Our Time Will Come; Yang Ya-che — The Bold, the Corrupt, and the Beautiful
**Best Leading Actor**: **Tu Men — Old Beast**; Kaiser Chuang — Who Killed Cock Robin; Huang Bo — The Conformist; Takeshi Kaneshiro — See You Tomorrow; Tian Zhuangzhuang — Love Education	**Best Leading Actress**: **Kara Hui — The Bold, the Corrupt, and the Beautiful**; Shu Qi — The Village of No Return; Sylvia Chang — Love Education; Vicky Chen — Angels Wear White; Ivy Yin — The Island That All Flow By
**Best Supporting Actor**: **Bamboo Chen — Alifu, the Prince/ss**; Mason Lee — Who Killed Cock Robin; Lei Jiayin — Brotherhood of Blades II: The Infernal Battlefield; Leon Dai — The Great Buddha +; Tony Leung Ka-fai — Our Time Will Come	**Best Supporting Actress**: **Vicky Chen — The Bold, the Corrupt, and the Beautiful**; Wu Yanshu — Love Education; Chen Shiang-chyi — The Receptionist; Deanie Ip — Our Time Will Come; Hsu Wei-ning — The Tag-Along 2
**Best New Director**: **Huang Hsin-yao — The Great Buddha +**; Huang Xi — Missing Johnny; Tan Seng Kiat — Shuttle Life; Zhou Ziyang — Old Beast; Chan Ching-lin — The Island That All Flow By	**Best New Performer**: **Rima Zeidan — Missing Johnny**; Kent Tsai — All Because of Love; Elane Zhong — Youth; Zhang Aoyue — The Hidden Sword; Wu Nien-hsuan — The Tag-Along 2
**Best Original Screenplay**: **Zhou Ziyang — Old Beast**; Liu Jian — Have a Nice Day; Sylvia Chang and You Xiaoying — Love Education; Wang Yu-lin, Hsu Hua-chien, Hua Bai-rong, Juliana Hsu and Chen Hui-ling— Alifu, the Prince/ss; Yang Ya-che — The Bold, the Corrupt, and the Beautiful	**Best Adapted Screenplay**: **Huang Hsin-yao — The Great Buddha +**; Li Baoluo — Bangzi Melody; Wong Kar-wai and Zhang Jiajia — See You Tomorrow; Geling Yan — Youth; Xu Haofeng — The Hidden Sword
**Best Cinematography**: **Nagao Nakashima — The Great Buddha +**; Wang Weihua — Free and Easy; Chen Ko-chin — Shuttle Life; Matthias Delvaux — Old Beast; Peter Pau and Cao Yu — See You Tomorrow	**Best Visual Effects**: **Johnny Lin, Perry Kain and Thomas Reppen — See You Tomorrow**; Yeh Jen-hao and Liu Wei-yi — Who Killed Cock Robin; Quan Hongkun, Yung Kwok-yin and Chan Tik-hoi — This Is Not What I Expected; Pao Cheng-hsun and Huang Mei-cing — Mon Mon Mon Monsters; Henri Wong and Eric Xu — Wu Kong
**Best Art Direction**: **Alfred Yau — See You Tomorrow**; Huang Mei-ching — The Village of No Return; Chao Shih-hao — The Great Buddha +; Shi Haiying — Youth; Penny Tsai — The Bold, the Corrupt, and the Beautiful	**Best Makeup & Costume Design**: **William Chang and Cheung Siu-hong — See You Tomorrow**; Liang Tingting — Brotherhood of Blades II: The Infernal Battlefield; Dora Ng — The Village of No Return; Liu Xiaoli — Youth; Wang Chia-hui — The Bold, the Corrupt, and the Beautiful
**Best Action Choreography**: **Sang Lin — Brotherhood of Blades II: The Infernal Battlefield**; Ku Huen-chiu — Wu Kong; An Wande — Explosion; Xu Haofeng — The Hidden Sword; Sammo Hung — Paradox	**Best Original Film Score**: **Lin Sheng Xiang — The Great Buddha +**; Lim Giong and Point Hsu — Missing Johnny; Kenji Kawai — Brotherhood of Blades II: The Infernal Battlefield; Joe Hisaishi — Our Time Will Come; An Wei — The Hidden Sword
**Best Original Film Song**: **"To Have, or Not To Have" — The Great Buddha +**; Composer： Lin Sheng-xiang; Lyrics： Ong Chiau-hoa; Performer: Lin Sheng-xiang; "I Love Shangri-La" — Have a Nice Day; Composer： Wang Da; Lyrics： Liu Jian; Performer：Wang Da and Zhu Hong; "Lullaby" — Free and Easy; Composer： Second Hand Rose; Lyrics： Liang Long; Performer： Liang Long; "Keep Me By Your Side" — See You Tomorrow; Composer： Tang Hanxiao; Lyrics： Tang Hanxiao; Performer： Eason Chan; "Flowers in Blossom" — Love Education; Composer： Kay Huang; Lyrics： Lam Kwun-fan; Performer： Sitar Tan	**Best Film Editing**: **Jean Tsien and Bob Lee — Plastic China**; Kipo Lin — Who Killed Cock Robin; Lai Hsiu-hsiung — The Great Buddha +; Liao Ching-song — The Foolish Bird; Mary Stephen and Kong Chi-leung — Our Time Will Come
**Best Sound Effects**: **Tu Duu-chih, Patrick Tu and Wu Shu-yao — Mon Mon Mon Monsters**; R.T Kao, Chen Wei-liang and Forgood Sound — Who Killed Cock Robin; Wen Bo — The Conformist; Tu Duu-chih and Wu Shu-yao — The Great Buddha +; Rockid Lee, Yang Che-chin, Warren Santiago and Richard Hocks — The Tag-Along 2	**Outstanding Taiwanese Filmmaker of the Year**: **Hu Ding-yi**
**Audience Choice Award**: **The Bold, the Corrupt, and the Beautiful**	**FIPRESCI Prize**: **Old Beast**
**Piaget Award**: **Love Education**	**Lifetime Achievement Award**: **Hsu Feng**
