= Angel Ho =

Taiwanese actress

- Born: 30 May 2007 (age 18); Taipei, Taiwan
- Occupation: actress

Chinese name
- Traditional Chinese: 何潔柔
- Simplified Chinese: 何洁柔
Transcriptions
Standard Mandarin
- Hanyu Pinyin: Hé Jiéróu

Angel Ho (traditional Chinese: 何潔柔; simplified Chinese: 何洁柔; pinyin: Hé Jiéróu) is a Taiwanese actress.

== Filmography ==
=== Film ===
Year	English title	Original title	Role	Notes
2014	Angel 'n' Devil			
2016	The Tenants Downstairs	樓下的房客	Wang Yun-ko	
2018	Tail End of the Year			
2020	Amensalism			
