= Cheng Wei-hao =

Taiwanese film director and screenwriter

- 程偉豪
- Cheng in 2026
- Born: 16 May 1984 (age 42); Kaohsiung, Taiwan
- Education: Fu Jen Catholic University (BA); National Taiwan University of Arts (MFA)
- Occupations: Film director; screenwriter
- Years active: 2008–present

Cheng Wei-hao (Chinese: 程偉豪; pinyin: Chéng Wěiháo; born 16 May 1984) is a Taiwanese film director and screenwriter.

== Career ==
Born in Kaohsiung, Cheng enrolled at Fu Jen Catholic University and graduated with a bachelor's degree in Advertising and Public Relations. Following graduation, Cheng attended National Taiwan University of Arts, where he obtained a master's degree in film studies. Cheng's interest in filmmaking began in his junior high school period. In 2008, he won a Beijing Film Academy Outstanding Asian Student Film award and an award for Best New Director at the South Taiwan Film Festival for the short film, You Are Not Alone (2008). Then, he directed the crime thriller Real Sniper (2009), followed by the mockumentary, The Death of a Security Guard (2015), which won the Best Short Film at the 52nd Golden Horse Awards. Aside from directing shorts, Cheng also had work experience in the visual design sector.

In 2015, Cheng made his feature film debut with The Tag-Along, a horror film based on an urban legend about a mysterious young girl in red following a group of hikers; the young girl is believed to be a mountain ghost who curses people. The Tag-Along played at several festivals and received four nominations at the 53rd Golden Horse Awards. The film was a box office success, with earning NT$85 million to become the highest grossing Taiwanese horror film to date. In 2017, Cheng's second feature film was released, a suspense film about a series of mysteries revolving around a nine-year-old car accident, titled Who Killed Cock Robin.

== Filmography ==
=== Films ===
Year	English title	Chinese title	Credit	Notes/Ref.
2008	You Are Not Alone	搞什麼鬼	Director	Short film
2009	Real Sniper	狙擊手	Director	Short film
2015	The Death of a Security Guard	保全員之死	Director	Short film, mockumentary
2015	The Tag-Along	紅衣小女孩	Director	
2017	Who Killed Cock Robin	目擊者	Director, co-writer	
2017	The Tag-Along 2	紅衣小女孩2	Director	
2019	"Lady In Red"	紅衣女孩	Director	Music video
2019	"Romance"	愛的羅曼死	Director, screenwriter, editor	Music video
2021	The Soul	缉魂	Director, co-writer	
2021	Man in Love	當男人戀愛時	Producer	
2021	The Pond	池塘怪談	Director, co-writer	Miniseries
2021	"I’m Weird"	我就奇怪	Director	Music video
2021	"Sorry for Youth"	Sorry 青春	Director	Music video
2022	Marry My Dead Body	關於我和鬼變成家人的那件事	Director, co-writer	Working title: Last Memory
2026	Vanishing Point	消失的人	Director, screenwriter	

=== Television series ===
Year	English title	Chinese title	Credit	Notes/Ref.
2021	The Pond	池塘怪談	Director, co-writer	
2024	GG Precinct	正港分局	Co-director, co-writer	

== Songwriting credits ==
Year	English title	Chinese title	Artist	Notes
2021	"Not Bitter"	不苦	Wu Qing-feng	Lyrics
2021	"Honey Ginseng"	蜂蜜人蔘	Oaeen	Lyrics
2021	"Sorry for Youth"	Sorry 青春	Oaeen	Lyrics
2021	"Weak Brain Waves"	腦波弱	Oaeen	Lyrics

== Awards and nominations ==
Year	Award	Category	Nominated work	Result
2008	Beijing Film Academy International Student Film and Video Festival	Outstanding Asian Student Film	You Are Not Alone	Won
2008	South Taiwan Film Festival	Best New Director	You Are Not Alone	Won
2010	Taipei Film Festival	Film Industry Award	Real Sniper	Won
2010	Asia-Pacific Film Festival	Best Short Film	Real Sniper	Nominated
2015	Kaohsiung International Short Film Competition	Taiwan Award	The Death of a Security Guard	Won
2015	Taipei Film Festival	Best Short Film	The Death of a Security Guard	Won
2015	Golden Harvest Awards	Award For Excellence (general category)	The Death of a Security Guard	Won
2015	Golden Horse Awards	Best Short Film	The Death of a Security Guard	Won
2016	Taipei Film Festival	Best Narrative Feature	The Tag-Along	Nominated
2016	Golden Horse Awards	Best New Director	The Tag-Along	Nominated
2016	Golden Horse Film Project Promotion Awards	Heaven Pictures Award	Last Memory	Won
2016	Golden Horse Film Project Promotion Awards	Malaysia Award	Last Memory	Won
2021	Taipei Film Festival	Best Narrative Feature	The Soul	Nominated
2021	Golden Horse Awards	Best Director	The Soul	Nominated
2021	Golden Horse Awards	Best Adapted Screenplay	The Soul	Nominated
2021	Golden Horse Awards	Best Visual Effects	The Soul	Won
2022	Taiwan Film Critics Society Awards	Best Narrative Feature	The Soul	Nominated
2022	Taiwan Film Critics Society Awards	Best Director	The Soul	Nominated
2022	Taiwan Film Critics Society Awards	Best Screenplay	The Soul	Nominated
2022	Golden Bell Awards	Best Directing for a Miniseries or Television Film	The Pond	Nominated
