= The Tag-Along 2 =

- Theatrical release poster
- Chinese: 紅衣小女孩2
- Hanyu Pinyin: Hóng yī xiǎo nǚ hái 2
- Directed by: Cheng Wei-hao
- Written by: Chien Shih-keng; Yang Wan-ju
- Produced by: Hank Tseng
- Starring: Rainie Yang; Hsu Wei-ning; Francesca Kao; Lung Shao-hua; River Huang
- Cinematography: Chen Chi-wen
- Edited by: Shieh Meng-ju
- Music by: Rockid Lee
- Production company: Greener Grass Production
- Distributed by: Vie Vision Pictures
- Release date: 25 August 2017
- Running time: 108 minutes
- Country: Taiwan
- Languages: Mandarin; Taiwanese
- Budget: NT$45,000,000
- Box office: NT$105,700,000 (Taiwan)

The Tag-Along 2 is a 2017 Taiwanese horror film directed by Cheng Wei-hao. It is a sequel to The Tag-Along (2015), which is adapted from the well-known Taiwanese urban legend, "The Little Girl in Red". The film stars Rainie Yang, Hsu Wei-ning, Francesca Kao, Lung Shao-hua and River Huang. It was released on 25 August 2017.

The film was a commercial success, grossing NT$105 million domestically against its NT$45 million budget.

== Synopsis ==
When social worker Li Shu-fen discovers that her pregnant teenage daughter Ya-ting has disappeared, her search for Ya-ting ends her with many horrifying mysteries. She blames Ya-ting's boyfriend Lin Chun-kai, who works as a shaman-in-training and vessel for a benevolent spirit called the "Tiger Lord", for Ya-ting's pregnancy.

Meeting the mysterious Lin Mei-hua, who imprisons her own daughter inside her house covered with papers written with spells, encounters the missing and pregnant Shen Yi-chun in an abandoned hospital. It is revealed that the girl in red is Mei-hua's daughter who died in a roller coaster accident. Mei-hua, a master of Feng Shui magic, used black magic to resurrect her but only for a demon to possess her daughter, making her the infamous girl in red. After the red girl wreaked havoc on the mountain by killing an unsuspecting hiker, Mei-hua decided to trap her using a big talisman cloth to cover her body and bury her in the mountain. However, a group of illegal loggers accidentally untombs her and enabled her to wreak havoc once again.

Shu-fen, Mei and Yi-chun decide to end the curse permanently and fight the red girl. Mei-hua is killed but Shu-fen manages to reach her daughter and saves her. Mei-hua's youngest daughter confronts her deceased older sister and reveals her mother's love for her, causing the red girl to banish the demon inside her, with her soul finally passing on to the afterlife to rest in peace. As her soul is finally put to rest, the curse in the mountain vanishes.

After properly burying Mei-Hua and her daughter, Yi-chun adopts the red girl's sister and Shu-fen attends her daughter's delivery, warmly welcoming her grandchild.

== Cast ==
- Rainie Yang as Li Shu-fen
- Hsu Wei-ning as Shen Yi-chun
- Francesca Kao as Lin Mei-hua
- Lung Shao-hua as Master Long
- River Huang as Ho Chih-wei
- Wu Nien-hsuan as Lin Chun-kai (Tiger Lord)
- Ruby Chan as Li Ya-ting
- Frankie Huang as Chang Ming-hao

== Soundtrack ==
No.	Title	Writer(s)	Performer	Length
1.	""Light Pollution""	Misi Ke	Misi Ke	07:02

== Release ==
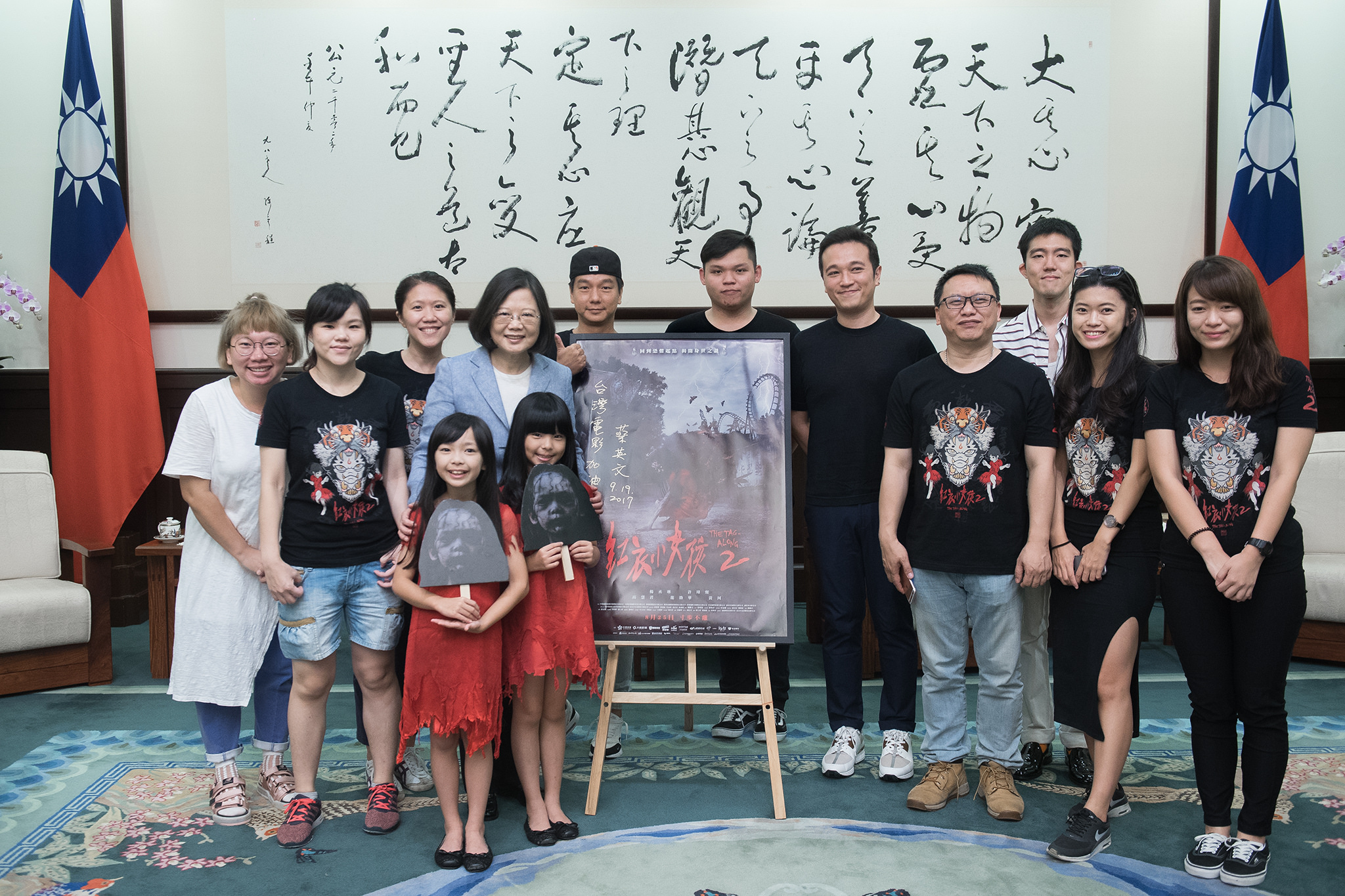
Taiwan President Tsai Ing-wen and the film crew

The film released its promotional poster and stills at the 2017 Hong Kong International Film & TV Market (Filmart) held during the Hong Kong International Film Festival. At Filmart, the film sold distribution rights to more than 19 regions, which is triple the number for the original The Tag-Along.

The film was released in the U.S. and Canada on 22 September 2017. It was screened at the Sitges Film Festival in Spain in October 2017.

== Box office ==
Three weeks after its release in Taiwan on 25 August 2017, The Tag-Along 2 became the top domestic box office hit in 2017.

By 11 September 2017, the film earned NT$92 million, out-grossing its predecessor (NT$85 million) in domestic takings to become the highest-grossing local horror film of the past decade. As of 3 October 2017, The Tag-Along 2 has grossed NT$104 million in Taiwan.

== Awards and nominations ==
Award	Category	Recipients	Result
54th Golden Horse Awards	Best Supporting Actress	Hsu Wei-ning	Nominated
54th Golden Horse Awards	Best New Performer	Wu Nien-hsuan	Nominated
54th Golden Horse Awards	Best Sound Effects	Rockid Lee, Yang Che-chin, Warren Santiago and Richard Hocks	Nominated

== See also ==
- Mo-sin-a
