= Yin Chen-hao =

Taiwanese music video director

Yin Chen-hao (Chinese: 殷振豪; born 10 March 1985) is a Taiwanese director of music videos. His debut feature film is Man in Love (2021).

During his graduate studies in chemistry at National Tsing Hua University, Yin cofounded Spacebar Studio in February 2012 with five other NTHU students. Spacebar Studio's early videos were low budget projects directed by Yin that were posted online, then subsequently went viral. He directed the music video for "LOVE", a song from the 2019 album Somewhere in Time, I Love You by Accusefive, which won the Golden Melody Award for Best Music Video at the 31st Golden Melody Awards ceremony in 2020. He directed the 2021 romantic drama Man in Love, his first feature-length film, and an adaption of the 2014 South Korean film of the same name.
