= Kaiser Chuang =

Taiwanese actor

- 莊凱勛
- Born: 22 March 1981 (age 45); Changhua, Taiwan
- Other names: Zhuang Kaixun; Cash Chuang
- Education: Taipei National University of the Arts (BFA)
- Occupation: Actor
- Years active: 2001—present
- Spouse: Liao Yi-an (m. 2016)
- Children: 2

Chinese name
- Traditional Chinese: 莊凱勛
- Hanyu Pinyin: Zhuāng Kǎixūn
- Jyutping: Zong1 Hoi2 Fan1
- Hokkien POJ: Chng Khái-hun

Kaiser Chuang or Chuang Kai-hsun (Chinese: 莊凱勛; pinyin: Zhuāng Kǎixūn; Pe̍h-ōe-jī: Chng Khái-hun; born 22 March 1981) is a Taiwanese actor.

== Early life and career ==
Born in Changhua County, Chuang graduated from the department of drama of Taipei National University of the Arts.

He has appeared in the films Step Back to Glory (2013), Who Is Undercover (2014) and The Tenants Downstairs (2016) and several plays and television series such as Breaking Free (2011) and Happy 300 Days (2013).

In 2015, Chuang received double nominations for the Golden Bell Award for Best Actor in a Miniseries or Television Film at the 50th Golden Bell Awards and won the award for his performance in The Road Home. The following year he won the Best Supporting Actor award at the 18th Taipei Film Festival for Maverick (2015).

He participated in the HBO Asia TV series “Trinity of Shadows” which consists of 15 one-hour episodes, as up-and-coming public official. The first two will launch on June 13, 2021 and be followed every subsequent Sunday with further installments. The series will play on HBO Go and HBO in Asia.

== Personal life ==
On August 2, 2016 Chuang married his girlfriend of two years, Liao Yi-an (Xiao An), who works in the fashion industry and who is nine years younger than Chuang. Their wedding reception was held on September 3, 2016 in Taipei.

== Filmography ==
=== Television ===
Year	English title	Original title	Role	Network	Notes
2005	Love On Old Mountain Railway	戀戀舊山線	Liu Yinghui	Hakka TV	
2005	Ben Chi's Line	奔馳的縱貫線	A-ching	PTS	Miniseries
2006	Happiness Station	幸福派出所	Kao Tsan-wei	Hakka TV	
2007	Going Home	回家	Wang Hsiao-ming	GTV	
2009	Origin	源	Chiu Kou	Hakka TV	
2010	Ju Dao Yi Shi Qing	菊島醫師情	Hou Wu-chung	DaAi TV	
2010	The Taste of Papaya	秋宜的婚事		PTS	Film
2011	17th Exit	十七號出入口	Lao Fu	PTS	Film
2011	Where Are You Now	你現在在哪？	A-liang	PTS	Film
2011	Sensory Crime	感官犯罪	Chiang Yen-te	PTS	Film
2011	Jiong Ien Sen	醬園生	Wu Cheng-hua	Hakka TV	
2011	Breaking Free	破浪而出	A-hsiu	DaAi TV	
2011	My Son	我兒阿輝	Hu Kuo-ping	DaAi TV	
2012	Ban Ni Tong Xing	伴你同行	Ni Kuo-chun	DaAi TV	
2012	Jump! Cheerleader	飆！企鵝里德	A-chuan	Hakka TV	
2013	The Music Class Never Ends	大雄的音樂教室	Ta Hsiung	PTS	Film
2013	Happy 300 Days	遇見幸福300天	Ting Hao-chuan	TTV	
2013	The Pursuit of Happiness	愛的生存之道	Ho Wei-ting	GTV	
2014	Go, A-wen!	加油喔！阿文	A-wen	PTS	Film
2015	The Road Home	回家路上	A-min	PTS	Film
2015	An Outing	出遊	A-chao	PTS	Film
2015	Spring Beauty	降生十二星座	Drinker	PTS	Film
2015	The Lunch Break	午休時間	Teacher	PTS	Film
2016	La Grande Chaumière Violette	紫色大稻埕	Chiang Wei-shui	SET Taiwan	
2016	Mysterious Equation	我家的方程式	Hsu Jung-yuan	DaAi TV	
2017	She's Family	媽媽不見了	Chou Wen-ping	Formosa TV	Miniseries
2017	The Galaxy Fighter Bushiban	銀河戰士特訓班	Chan Shih-hao	PTS	Film
2017	Wake Up 2	麻醉風暴2	Wan Ta-chi	PTS	Miniseries
2017	Fang Duo Chong De Ji Yi	紡綞蟲的記憶	Huang Yu-yen	PTS	
	Forward Sisters	姊妹們，上	Joseph		
2019	The Driver	伺机	Jian Yi 建一	Toggle Original Series / Mediacorp Channel U / Mediacorp Channel 8	1st Male Lead; Pairs up with Jesseca Liu; Toggle Original Series
2024	A Fight for Justice	無罪推定	Lee Jheng-swoh	PTS Taigi	Miniseries
2025	Zero Day	零日攻擊			

=== Film ===
Year	English title	Original title	Role	Notes
2006	Do Over	一年之初	Traffic police	
2006	Désincarnation	肉身蛾		
2006	The Song of Cha-Tian Mountain	插天山之歌	Lu Chih-hsiang	
2008	Never Give Up	不能回家的小孩	Wang	
2010	Tears	眼淚	Ah Ming	
2010	Thief	小偷	Luke	Short film
2011	Prison	牢		Short film
2011	Falling Edge	墜落邊緣	Jay	Short film
2011	Everlasting Moments	靈魂的旅程	Jay	
2012	Gravity Zero	無重力	Ben	Short film
2012	My Dear Stilt	候鳥來的季節	Lin Chia-hsiung	
2013	Step Back to Glory	志氣	Mr. Kao	
2014	Who Is Undercover	王牌	Secretary Kao	
2014	Taipei Factory II – Luca	台北工廠2-盧卡	Chen Guo-xing	
2015	Maverick	菜鳥	Yang Ming-cheng	
2015	Taste of Life	百味人生	Chen Lei	
2015	Elena	愛琳娜	Liao Chun-ming	
2016	The Tenants Downstairs	樓下的房客	Chang Kuo-sheng	
2016	Packages from Daddy	心靈時鐘	Mr. Chou	
2017	Who Killed Cock Robin	目擊者	Wang Yi-chi (Hsiao-chi)	
2017	Iphigenia's Night	伊菲基妮亞之夜	Jie	Short film
2017	Father to Son	在一個死亡之後	Fan Pao-te (young)	
2019	Deep Evil			
2019	Paradise Next			
2021	American Girl	美國女孩	Liang Chong-hui	

=== Music video appearances ===
Year	Artist	Song title
2011	Mayday	"Noah's Ark"
2012	Christine Fan	"Bounce"
2015	LTK Commune	"Nylon's Last Words"

== Theater ==
Year	English title	Mandarin title
2001	An Official Storm	一官風波
2003	Room 118	成人娛樂
2004	Staying Focused	越來越難集中精神
2006	Sweet Time	旋律,在愛情交界處
2007	Madame Bovary Is Me	包法利夫人們
2009	Design For Living	華麗上班族之生活與生存
2013	Nice To Hear From You	收信快樂
2015	I Hate Therefore I Marry	恨嫁家族
2016	For Youth	我記得...

== Awards and nominations ==
Year	Award	Category	Nominated work	Result
2010	45th Golden Bell Awards	Best Supporting Actor in a Miniseries or Television Film	Breaking Free	Nominated
2010	15th Asian Television Awards	Best Supporting Actor	Breaking Free	Nominated
2012	49th Golden Horse Awards	Best Supporting Actor	My Dear Stilt	Nominated
2015	50th Golden Bell Awards	Best Actor in a Miniseries or Television Film	The Road Home	Won
2015	50th Golden Bell Awards	Best Actor in a Miniseries or Television Film	An Outing	Nominated
2016	18th Taipei Film Festival	Best Supporting Actor	Maverick	Won
2017	54th Golden Horse Awards	Best Leading Actor	Who Killed Cock Robin	Nominated
2023	58th Golden Bell Awards	Best Leading Actor in a Miniseries or Television Film	Bonus Trip	Nominated
