= Amazing Film Studio =

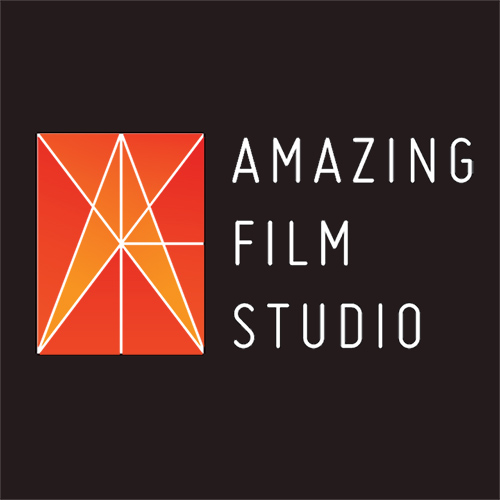
- Industry: Film
- Founded: 2012
- Founder: Adam Tsuei
- Headquarters: Taipei, Taiwan
- Website: www.facebook.com/amazingfilmstudio

Amazing Film Studio is a film production company founded by Adam Tsuei in 2012.

== Filmography ==
- Tiny Times (2013)
- Tiny Times 2 (2013)
- Café. Waiting. Love (2014)
- The Tenants Downstairs (2016)
