= Francesca Kao =

Taiwanese actress (born 1972)

- 高慧君
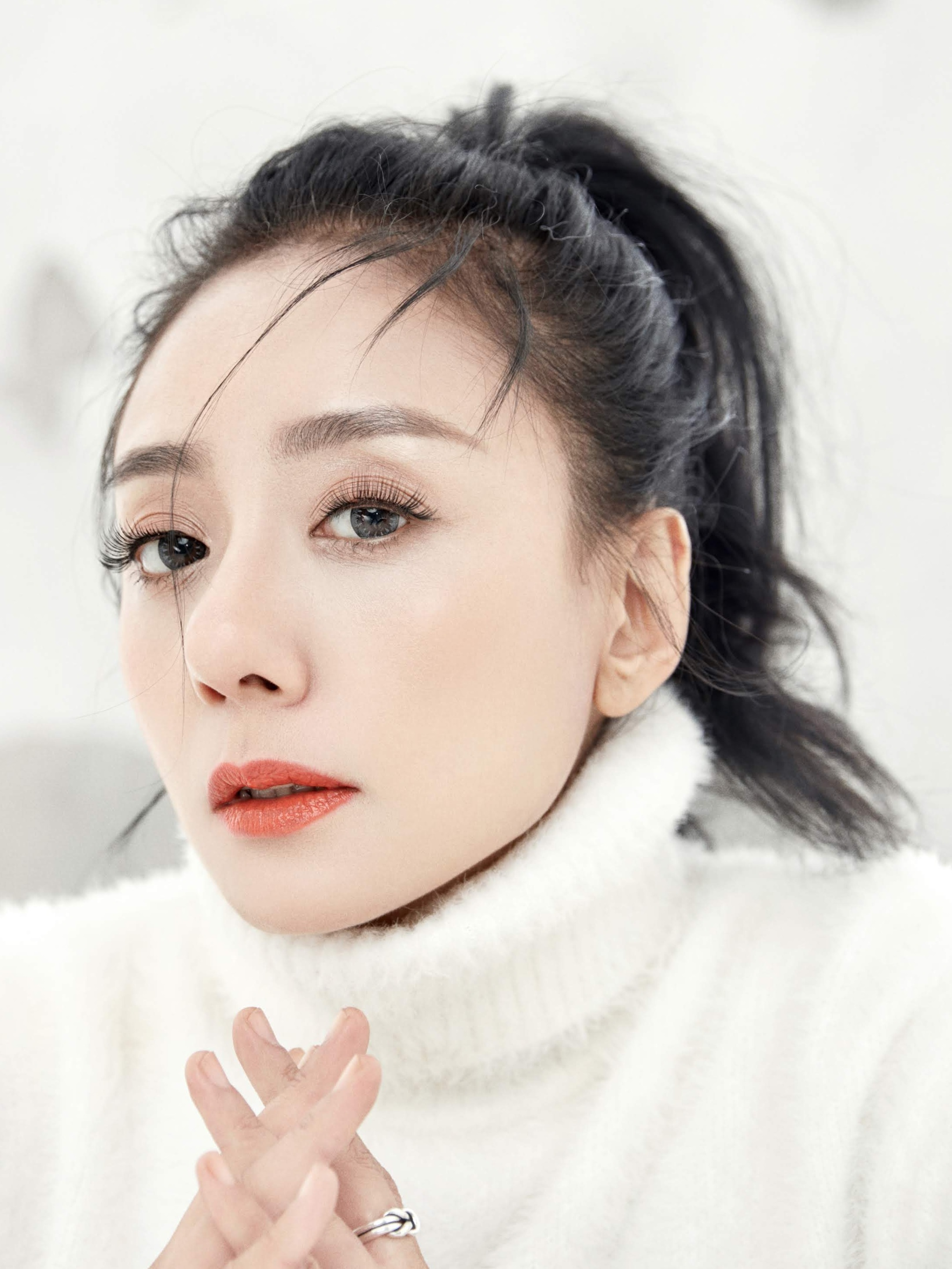
- Kao in 2018
- Born: Paicʉ Yatauyungana; 24 August 1972 (age 54); Dabang Village, Alishan, Chiayi County, Taiwan
- Occupations: Actress; singer; television host
- Years active: 1998–present
- Family: Lea Kao (sister)
- Musical career
- Also known as: Kao Hui-chun; Gao Huijun; Francesca Gao; Paicx Yatauyungana
- Genre: Mandopop
- Instrument: Vocals

Francesca Kao (Chinese: 高慧君, Tsou: Tanivu Yata'uyungana; born 24 August 1972) is a Taiwanese Tsou actress, singer and television host, known for her duet, "You're the Most Precious" with Hong Kong singer Jacky Cheung.

Since 2003, Kao has acted in numerous television series and films. She has won two Golden Bell Awards, one in 2007 and another in 2010, for her roles in the Da Ai dramas Beautiful Dawn and Green Lawn. She is the granddaughter of Uyongʉ Yata'uyungana.

== Filmography ==
=== Television series ===
Year	English title	Original title	Role	Notes
2003	Friends	名揚四海	Chen's mother	
2003	Love Train	心動列車		
2004	Dana Sakura	風中緋櫻	Chang Hsiu-mei	
2004	Taiwan Lilies	台灣百合	Kao Bai-he	
2005	Detective Story A.S.T.	偵探物語		
2006	Hunter	獵人		
2007	Beautiful Dawn	關山系列(二)-美麗晨曦	Hu Yu-pei	
2007	Totem	圖騰轉呀轉		
2007	Stars Know My Heart 2007	星星知我心2007	Music café singer	Cameo
2008	Golden Line	撿稻穗系列－黃金線	Li-hsueh	
2008	Yi Nuo Zhi Ge	依諾之歌	Ching-ho	
2009	Game Winning Hit	比賽開始	Ticket seller	Alternative title: Play Ball; Cameo
2009	Green Lawn	芳草碧連天	Wei Hsing-fen	
2009	Light	大愛長情劇展－曙光	Lin Chin-hua	
2009	Shining Days	閃亮的日子	Su Man	
2009	Yi Shih Cing	醫世情	Chang Yao-chen	
2010	Summer's Desire	泡沫之夏	Luna Yin	
2010	Going Home	關懷系列迷你劇－回家		
2012	Bai Wan Tuo Cai Gong	人間渡系列－百萬拖菜工	Shih Chin-chih	
2013	Spring in the Heart	水返腳的春天	Chou Ching-fen	
2013	The Cursed Mere	陂塘	Shen Chun-lan	
2013	White Magnolia	孤戀花	Chen Chun-mei (Bai Mei)	
2014	Hold Your Hands and Go On the Way of Love	牽你的手 走愛的路	Chang Feng-chu	
2015	To the Dearest Intruder	致，第三者	Lo's mother	
2015	Tomorrow Is Another Day	明日天晴	Wu Pen	
2016	Brides Married Here	新娘嫁到	Class teacher	Cameo
2016	Thirty Something	我的30定律	Ms. Lin	Cameo
2016	All in 700	700歲旅程	Tan Li-chen	Episode 2

=== Film ===
Year	English title	Original title	Role	Notes/Ref.
2009	The Calling	鄒 召喚	—N/a	Short film; As director and screenwriter
2011	Pick the Youth	皮克青春	Mother	
2012	No Way Home	公視學生劇展－離家的女人	Chun-mei	Short film
2013	Moonlight Forest	月光森林	Chun-mei	Television
2013	The Losers	廢物	Mei-hsia	
2015	Lonely Memory	孤單的豌豆	Scar	
2015	Single for 10 Days	十日單身	Shen Hui-liang	Television
2017	The Tag-Along 2	紅衣小女孩 2	Lin Mei-hua	
2018	The Tag-Along: The Devil Fish	人面魚: 紅衣小女孩外傳	Lin Mei-hua	
2020	Get the Hell Out	逃出立法院	Wang Feng-hua	

=== Television show ===
Year	English title	Original title	Notes
2007	Rock Ancestors	搖滾祖靈	Host
2008	Indigenous TV Festival	原視影展	Host
2010	The Blazing Sun	火中的太陽	Host
2010	Waterfall Legends of Taiwan	台灣的瀑布傳奇	Host, writer
2011	Justice and Rightfulness	映像公與義	Host

=== Music video appearances ===
Year	Artist	Song title
2014	Mary See the Future	"Cheer"

== Discography ==
=== Studio albums ===
Title	Album details	Track listing
The Beautiful Sincere Women 認真的女人最美麗	Released: 11 March 1999; Label: PolyGram Taiwan; Formats: CD, digital download	Track listing: 1. 認真的女人最美麗; 2. 管我快不快樂; 3. 你是不愛我的，對嗎？; 4. 雨季過後; 5. Asking for the Moon; 6. 報應; 7. 愛色; 8. You & I 9. 都是寂寞惹的禍; 10. Please Don't Go; 11. 你最珍貴（with Jacky Cheung）
Turn Around 轉身	Released: 22 October 1999; Label: Universal Music Taiwan; Formats: CD, digital download	Track listing: 1. 轉身; 2. 我不覺得; 3. 笑不出來; 4. 愛與願違; 5. 傷心女人唱歌; 6. 失眠; 7. 弄丟（with Dick and Cowboy）; 8. 插翅難飛; 9. 高興就好（with Shirley Yee）; 10. 若即若離; 11. 有愛快講; 12. 不必再拖
Forgotten 忘了	Released: 7 December 2001; Label: Universal Music Taiwan; Formats: CD, digital download	Track listing: 1. 忘了; 2. 愛上你是我的罪; 3. 給我個說法; 4. 魔力搖滾; 5. Na Na Na; 6. 聰明一點; 7. 最後的情人節; 8. 老天！我不愛了; 9. 愛情釀的酒; 10. Let's Go Party Now
A Woman's Heart 點播女人心	Released: 11 June 2002; Label: Universal Music Taiwan; Formats: CD, digital download	Track listing: 1. 世界末日; 2. 我學不會; 3. 認真的女人最美麗; 4. 笑不出來; 5. 我不覺得; 6. 愛與願違; 7. 忘了; 8. 愛上你是我的罪; 9. 老天！我不愛了; 10. 你是不愛我的,對嗎？; 11. 報應; 12. You & I 13. 弄丟（with Dick and Cowboy）; 14. 你最珍貴（with Jacky Cheung）

=== Compilation albums ===
Title	Album details	Track listing
The River of Life 大愛人間1 – 生命的河流	Released: 1 September 2008; Label: Great Music Publishing; Formats: CD, digital download	Track listing: 1. 美麗晨曦; 2. 日出的聲音
Pasunaino Ci Mamispingi No Cou 鄒女在唱歌	Released: 26 December 2008; Label: Himalaya Records; Formats: CD, digital download	Track listing: 1. 取笑 (with Lea Kao, Yangui Yasiungu, Yangui Luhiacana and Kuadu Yasiungu); 2. 也不錯; 3. 指尖髮間
Voice of the Heart 大愛人間11 – 有愛的心世界	Released: 1 October 2012; Label: Great Music Publishing; Formats: CD, digital download	Track listing: 1. 心中的陽光

== Theater ==
Year	English title	Original title
2008	Wonderful World	我要成名音樂劇-美好世界
2011	Chen Cheng Po's Life	我是油彩的化身
2015	Reunion	同學會
2015–2017	Beauty is in the Eye of the Beholder	情人哏裡出西施

== Awards and nominations ==
Year	Award	Category	Nominated work	Result
2006	41st Golden Bell Awards	Best Actress in a Miniseries or Television Film	Totem	Nominated
2007	42nd Golden Bell Awards	Best Leading Actress in a Television Series	Beautiful Dawn	Won
2010	45th Golden Bell Awards	Best Supporting Actress in a Television Series	Green Lawn	Won
2010	45th Golden Bell Awards	Best Leading Actress in a Television Series	Light	Nominated
2023	58th Golden Bell Awards	Best Leading Actress in a Television Series	The Amazing Grace of Σ	Nominated
