= Zombie 108 =

- Directed by: Joe Chien
- Written by: Joe Chien
- Produced by: Morris Rong
- Starring: Yvonne Yao; Morris Rong; Tai Bo; Jack Kao; Dennis To; Chu Mu-yen
- Cinematography: Lin Yu Tang
- Edited by: Elizabeth Mok
- Music by: Chen Wei Chun
- Production company: Heyshine International Co.
- Release dates: 6 April 2012 (Brussels International Fantastic Film Festival); 29 September 2012 (Japan)
- Running time: 87 minutes
- Country: Taiwan
- Languages: Mandarin; English; Japanese

Zombie 108 (Chinese: 棄城Z-108) is a 2012 Taiwanese horror film directed by Joe Chien, starring Yvonne Yao, Morris Rong, Tai Bo, Jack Kao, Dennis To and Chu Mu-yen.

== Cast ==
- Yvonne Yao as Linda
- Morris Rong as Gangster Boss
- Tai Bo as Swat Captain
- Jack Kao as Swat Commander
- Dennis To as Swat
- Chu Mu-yen as Swat

== Reception ==
Ho Yi of the Taipei Times wrote that "With a more than adequate beginning that recalls many blockbusters of its kind, the self-proclaimed horror B-movie gets off to a good start. Yet the momentum soon dissipates as the movie struggles to flesh out its story." Elizabeth Kerr of The Hollywood Reporter wrote that "Joe Chien fails to bring anything new to the table with this Asian take on the zombie-horror phenomenon; horror aficionados may still give the dying film a chance."

Mark Adams of Screen Daily wrote that while "The film starts well enough with the zombies (of the slow-moving variety) enthusiastic in their munching techniques and the cop’n’crooks liberal in their gunfire", the "action is only adequately staged" and the script is "pretty poor". Adrian Halen of HorrorNews.net wrote that "There are far too many ideas in the last segment that you tend to not care about any of them."

Pierce Conran of ScreenAnarchy wrote that "The film makes almost no sense and doesn't really seem to begin or end. It veers from one poorly thought out vignette to the next, with little rhyme or reason. It lacks a cohesive story, characters, scares, production values and just about anything that you consider important in a film. The only thing that marks it at all is its attitude: it is misogynist, apathetic and clearly demonstrates that the filmmakers couldn't give a damn about their audience."
