= Chien Shih-keng =

Chien Shih-keng (Chinese: 簡士耕; born 1980) is a Taiwanese screenwriter.

Chien was credited in All You Need Is Love (2015), then worked on The Tag-Along (2015) and The Tag-Along 2 (2017). He shared the Golden Horse Award for Best Adapted Screenplay with John Hsu and Fu Kai-ling for Detention (2019). Chien later worked on Get the Hell Out (2020).
