= The Tag-Along =

- Theatrical release poster
- 紅衣小女孩
- Directed by: Cheng Wei-hao
- Written by: Chien Shih-keng
- Produced by: Hank Tseng
- Starring: Hsu Wei-ning; River Huang; Liu Yin-shang
- Cinematography: Chen Ko-chin
- Edited by: Kao Ming-sheng
- Music by: Rockid Lee
- Production company: Greener Grass Production
- Distributed by: Vie Vision Pictures
- Release dates: 19 November 2015 (Golden Horse Film Festival); 27 November 2015 (Taiwan)
- Running time: 91 minutes
- Country: Taiwan
- Language: Mandarin
- Box office: US$1.8 million

The Tag-Along (紅衣小女孩) is a 2015 Taiwanese horror film directed by Cheng Wei-hao and adapted from a well-known Taiwanese urban legend, "The Little Girl in Red". The film received funding from Taiwan's Bureau of Audiovisual and Music Industry Development and stars Hsu Wei-ning, River Huang and Liu Yin-shang. The film was released in Taiwan on 27 November 2015, and was screened at the Bucheon International Fantastic Film Festival and the 2015 Golden Horse Film Festival as the closing film. It received four nominations at the 53rd Golden Horse Awards.

== Plot ==
Property agent Wei (River Huang) lives with his grandmother (Liu Yin-shang), but one day she suddenly disappears when she is apparently abducted by someone or something. One night, Wei brings Yi-Chun (Hsu Wei-ning), his girlfriend, home after her shift (she works as a radio DJ), with the intent to mortgage his grandmother's house, marry Yi-Chun, and start a family. Yi-Chun reveals that marriage wasn't her plan.

When Wei brings Yi-Chun to his grandmother's home, he notices that food has been prepared, but his grandmother is going out with a friend. The next morning, Wei receives a package at his workplace, which contains a camera. On it is a video of his grandmother and some friends hiking. Things seem fine until he notices a little girl in a red dress following the group. Wei visits his Uncle Kun (Po-Chou Chang) and finds out that the camera that was mailed to him belonged to his Aunt Shui. While searching the premises with his uncle, a loud crash is heard and a stereo system starts playing music before a door is slammed shut. The two manage to escape the building. Uncle Kun shows Wei and Yi-Chun video footage of the day his grandmother went missing. Yi-Chun realizes that his grandmother wasn't home that morning, as they did not return until the evening. After rewinding the footage, Wei notices a little girl in a red dress leading her down the street. The footage also reveals a similar little girl chasing them out of the building the previous night.

The next morning, Wei has a flashback of him and his grandmother eating at the table. He appears to hear whispers which seem to guide him around the house, and he follows a trail of blood back to the kitchen. He encounters a demonic entity which seems to take over him, but he wakes up from the nightmare. Oddly enough, Wei's grandmother finally returns.

One night during her shift, Yi-chun takes a mysterious call, and the caller quietly repeats, "He doesn't love me anymore," before hanging up. Wei shows up out of the blue, inviting her to have dinner with his grandma. But, Yi-Chun is hesitant to accept his invitation, as Wei appears sweaty and sick. She brings him to a doctor. When she is given the forms, Yi-Chun finds that Wei is missing. She goes to look for him, and finds him staring into a nursery, looking at the babies. He expresses his sadness over Yi-Chun not wanting to marry him or have children. Wei leaves abruptly, and Yi-Chun follows him. She looks into the nursery, but does not see any babies inside. Wei brings Yi-Chun home with him, and he goes into the kitchen to eat dinner, and Yi-Chun is shocked to find him eating bugs and worms, as if he is unaware. She runs to fetch Uncle Kun to bring him to Wei, but he goes missing.

Wei's grandmother is seen walking down the highway, with a police cruiser seemingly coming to a stop. Meanwhile, at the house, Uncle Kun and Yi-Chun perform what seems to be a blessing over the home, shouting at the ghosts to go back where they came from. Yi-Chun goes to the hospital, where Wei's grandmother is currently resting uncomfortably, her mental condition declared "unstable." Later that night, Yi-Chun does research involving the mountain, and stumbles across a video, explaining that 'mosiens' cause people to lose their minds. The video also explains that setting off firecrackers and other explosives, can remove the evil, making a home habitable once more. At the same time, Yi-Chun reads several articles about the urban legend, the Little Girl in Red.

Uncle Kun goes over security footage when his name is heard over his walkie-talkie. He investigates, but finds nothing. When he sits down again, he sees a little girl in a red dress running through the streets before she jumps into a tree. His booth door opens behind him, and he closes it again. The little girl appears, and he flees his booth. As he attempts to light a firecracker, he is attacked by the little girl.

Yi-Chun receives an update from the hospital doctor. The staff suspected that Wei's grandmother may have had food poisoning. After running tests on her vomit, they discovered a living moth chrysalis. The Toxicology department identified the very rare insect as "death's-head hawk-moth." They remained perplexed as to how it got there. While doing research on the insect, Yi-Chun realizes that the face pictured on the moth bears a striking resemblance to that of the Little Girl in Red. That night, Yi-Chun struggles to get sleep, and she notices blood on her arms, soon becoming enveloped in a pool of blood before seeing the Little Girl. She then awakes from the nightmare, frightened.

As Yi-Chun leaves for work, Wei's grandmother tells her that when Wei returns, she will leave the house to him. She goes on to tell that the family was well off but they lost their fortune, which is why Wei works so hard. Yi-Chun asks Uncle Kun to keep on eye on grandma before leaving for work. She makes a public radio announcement, asking for more information about the strange species of moth. Yi-Chun gets a strange phone call, and hangs up abruptly to jot something down. Outside, police interrogate a man who claims that he is going to the mountains to find "her." Yi-Chun returns home after wandering through the forest around the mountains and looks at picture of her and Wei.

Yi-Chun joins a local rescue group on a mission to find Wei and his grandmother. While exploring the mountains, Yi-Chun spots Wei's grandmother, who is taken away, both frightened, telling them to "go back!" Later in the evening, Yi-Chun tells the group that a retired mountain guide, by the name of Wang Tien-Tze told her the location of her boyfriend. However, a group member tells her that he died a long time ago. In the morning, the team splits up to investigate three different paths. During the trek, she becomes lost in the woods. The area begins to fog immensely, and Yi-Chun ties red tape around some trees, blowing her whistle hoping to be found. She lights a flare after being grabbed by a mysterious hand. Just then, the strange moth in a tree opens its wings, releasing several more in Yi-Chun's direction.

When she awakens, she lights another flare, while hearing a girl call out for her mother. She then encounters a multitude of dead bodies in the trees. She then looks down to see that she is pregnant and begins to bleed uncontrollably as she apparently gives birth to a child. The child asks why Yi-Chun didn't want it. As Yi-Chun embraces the bloody newborn, she wakes up from the seemingly treacherous nightmare.

In the morning, Yi-Chun wakes to find Wei in his home. She finds out that his grandmother has been in a nursing home for two years now. She attempts to leave to see her, but Wei stops her. She then grabs a flare to scare away the demonic creature, revealing that it was an illusion, and she is still in the woods. Several of the other creatures appear, and Yi-Chun finds Wei barely clinging to life and tied to a tree. As they attempt to escape, she trips and falls, as the Little Girl in the Red Dress bounds her with tree branches. The girl transforms into a hideous creature and begins to choke Yi-Chun, as she recalls memories of her and Wei. She manages to grab a flare and burn the creature to set herself free. A beam of light wards off the evil creatures, and she returns to Wei, before she is carried away by the other members of the rescue team.

In the future, Yi-Chun and Wei are married, and Yi-Chun is pregnant with his child. As the movie is coming to an end, Yi-chun, Wei and Wei's grandmother are eating happily together, everything seeming to have come back to normal. A death's-head hawk-moth flies over to a wall hinting that Yi-Chun never escaped the forest and is still trapped there in an illusion.

== Cast ==
- Hsu Wei-ning as Shen Yi-chun, a radio DJ and Wei's girlfriend
- River Huang as Ho Chih-wei, a property agent who lives with his grandmother. Yi-chun's boyfriend of five years.
- Liu Yin-shang as Ho Wen Shu-fang, Wei's grandmother
- Chang Po-Chou as Uncle Kun, security officer of the apartment building
- Lin Yi-zhen, Yang Jia-yun, Chen Liang-tong and Chen Ling-fan as "The Little Girl in Red"
- Yumi Wong as Bei-bei's mother
- Mario Pu as Property agent manager, Wei's manager
- Pai Ming-hua as Aunty A-shui
- Jin Mei-an as Aunty A-li
- Basang Yawei as Captain of Search and Rescue Team

== Production ==
Filming locations include the Fuzhoushan Park in Daan District, Taipei City.

== Soundtrack ==
Title	Performer	Writer
"The Tag-Along"	Kuo Shu-yao	Hsu Wen

== Reception ==
The Tag-Along premiered on a Friday and within the first weekend, earned a Taipei box office of NT$8,670,000, and a Taiwan box office of more than NT$30 million. It overtook Hollywood film The Conjuring and local film Silk's opening weekend box office gross, and also broke the ten year record of the best-selling horror film in Taiwan.

== Sequel ==
The sequel was released on 25 August 2017. Hsu Wei-ning and River Huang reprised their roles, with Rainie Yang, Francesca Kao and Lung Shao-hua joining the cast.

The prequel was released on 23 November 2018. Vivian Hsu plays leading role.

== Awards and nominations ==
Awards	Category	Recipient	Result
2016 Taipei Film Awards	Best Actor	River Huang	Won
2016 Taipei Film Awards	Best Actress	Hsu Wei-ning	Won
53rd Golden Horse Awards	Best New Director	Cheng Wei-hao	Nominated
53rd Golden Horse Awards	Best Actress	Hsu Wei-ning	Nominated
53rd Golden Horse Awards	Best Visual Effects	Charles Lee, Liu Chi-shan	Nominated
53rd Golden Horse Awards	Best Film Editing	Kao Ming-sheng, Wang Ching-chiao	Nominated

== See also ==
- Mo-sin-a
