= Mo-sin-a =

Creature in Taiwanese folklore

The Mo-sin-a (Chinese: 魔神仔; Pe̍h-ōe-jī: Mô͘-sîn-á) is a monstrous creature in Taiwanese folklore. They are typically depicted as human-like beings and their bodies are short and furry.

== Legend ==
The mo-sin-a are considered a type of demon who lives in mountain forests. They are said to lure people away to remote spots like mountain forests or caves. Japanese-era newspapers mention it several times, and the demon was featured in the horror movie series, The Tag-Along.

== See also ==
- Lists of legendary creatures
- Spirit away
