= Mo Tzu-yi =

Taiwanese actor (born 1981)

- 莫子儀
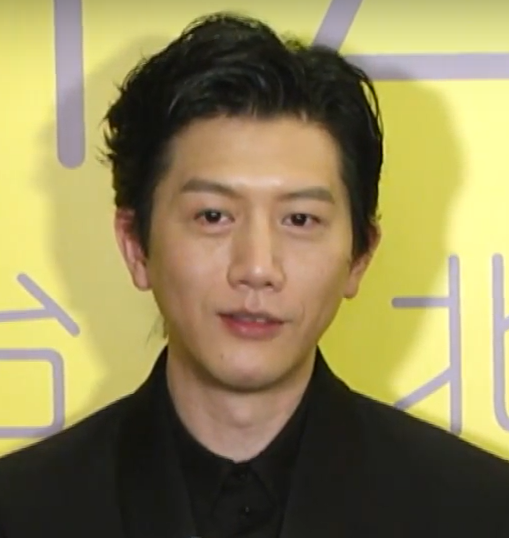
- Mo in July 2022
- Born: Mo Tzu-yi; 23 June 1981 (age 45); Wanli District, New Taipei, Taiwan
- Education: Taipei National University of the Arts (BFA)
- Occupation: Actor
- Years active: 1996–present

Morning Mo Tzu-yi (Chinese: 莫子儀; born 23 June 1981) is a Taiwanese actor. He debuted as a stage actor and began his on-screen career in 2005, starring in the films The Most Distant Course (2007) and A Place of One's Own (2009). He expanded his career internationally with the multinational film Snowfall in Taipei (2010) and the Australian-Singaporean film Canopy (2013), and also co-wrote and starred as Lu Ho-jo in the autobiographical drama Roseki 1914 (2018), winning Best Writing and receiving a nomination for Best Male Lead in the 53rd Golden Bell Awards.

Mo delivered his breakout performance with Cheng Yu-chieh's Dear Tenant (2020), for which he won a Golden Horse Award and a Taipei Film Award. Following the critical recognition, Mo also starred in Goddamned Asura (2021) and The Embers (2024), for which he received another nomination for Best Supporting Actor in the 61st Golden Horse Awards with the latter.

== Early life and education ==
Mo was born on 23 June 1981, in Wanli District, New Taipei. His father worked as a taxi driver and in private security, while his mother was a hawker. He spent his childhood in the mountainous regions of Wanli, and later moved to Yonghe District, New Taipei City, living near the Fuhe Grand Theater. His father took him to watch movies there in his youth, sparking his interest in film, and he often skipped classes in the future to watch films at that theater. Mo attended the National Overseas Chinese Experimental Senior High School, where he described his school years as "rebellious" and was nearly expelled after failing eight subjects in his first year. However, he was invited to join the school's drama club in the second semester, which ignited his passion for acting, and he cited the "sense of freedom" he felt on stage as a key reason for his newfound interest. He began participating in stage performances at the age of 15, and starred in the 1997 short film Wild Sparrow written by Yang Ya-che. After discovering his passion for acting, Mo dedicated himself to studying and was admitted to Taipei National University of the Arts to pursue a degree in performing arts. He was mentored by stage director Ma Tin-ni, and pursued an intensive course load, graduating after five years. During his university years, he developed an appreciation for literature, and worked part-time at Eslite Bookstore on Dunhua South Road in Taipei, often reading books there even when he was off duty.

== Career ==
=== Early ventures (1996–2009) ===
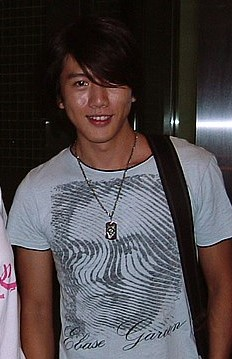
Mo shooting the variety program The Million Dollars Primary School in August 2009

Mo began his stage acting career in 1996, starring in One Hundred Years of Solitude, Water Margin, Dream of the Red Chamber, Tangut Inn, and Crystal Boys. He also appeared in Public Television Service television films, receiving nominations for Best Male Lead in a Television Series in the 35th Golden Bell Awards and Best Supporting Actor in a Miniseries or Television Film in the 37th Golden Bell Awards for his roles in The Pact of Choshui River and Watan's Wine Bottle respectively. Mo was cast in a supporting role as a journalist in the 2002 drama film Somewhere Over The Dreamland, but returned to stage acting after that performance. In 2005, after completing his mandatory military service, he began his on-screen acting career. He described his on-screen career as "unproductive", as he typically took on only one role at a time and often requested extensions of several months for pre-production to prepare for his characters, which led him to reject many offers. Before turning 30, he worked part-time at various restaurants to make a living, including nearly a year as a dishwasher. Mo, having been acquainted with Cheng Yu-chieh since 18 years old, debuted in Cheng's 2006 drama film Do Over, portraying Lixiang, an "indecisive" young director.

In 2007, Mo starred as Xiao Tang, a touring sound recordist, in the romance film The Most Distant Course alongside Gwei Lun-mei. His character was inspired by director Lin Jing-jie's friend and sound designer Tang Shiang-chu. Although Mo had a different appearance and physique than Tang, Lin decided to cast him because he felt that Mo's "focus and delicate" gaze during his audition resembled the qualities of a sound designer. In 2008, Mo appeared in the television film Artemisia, earning a nomination for Best Leading Actor in a Miniseries or Television Film in the 43rd Golden Bell Awards, and had a minor role in the drama film Candy Rain. The following year, he played a washed-up punk rocker Mozi, who is overshadowed by the success of his folk musician girlfriend (played by Lu Chia-hsin) in Lou Yi-an's feature debut A Place of One's Own. Mo was initially cast as the son of a zhizha artisan played by Jack Kao, but switched roles at the request of the film's music director Hsu Chien-hsiu after hearing his singing. (Note: The role of the zhizha artisan's son was filled by Tang Zhen-gang.) Unfamiliar with the guitar, Mo spent three months learning the instrument before filming for the role.

=== Multinational career (2010–2017) ===
In 2010, Mo appeared in the Singaporean romance film Forever as Gin, a Taiwanese expat who enters into a relationship with a filmmaker played by Joanna Dong, and made a brief appearance in Cheng Wen-tang's film Tears. He also took on a leading role as Jack, a journalist searching for a missing singer played by Tong Yao, in the Chinese-Hong Kong-Taiwanese-Japanese co-production Snowfall in Taipei. The following year, Mo starred as the romantic interest of Herb Hsu's character in the Hakka TV historical series Jiong Ien Sen, and as Hsiao Tzu-chien, a university student who becomes a vegetative state survivor after a car accident, in the Da Ai Television series Son, My Love Forever. In 2012, he participated in another international project, the Hong Kong film Cross. He also secured a main role in the Taiwan Television family drama An Innocent Mistake, playing Cheng Yu-en, the estranged son of Wang Shih-hsien's character, which earned him his second nomination for Best Male Lead in the 48th Golden Bell Awards. In 2013, Mo starred as Seng, a Singaporean-Chinese resistance fighter, in the Australian-Singaporean war film Canopy, with Todd Brown of Screen Anarchy commending his performance as "stellar" and "engaging", noting that it kept the audience captivated. He was approached by the Australian director Aaron Wilson, who had watched a previous work of Mo, at the Hong Kong Film Market and invited him to join the project.

Mo made a cameo appearance alongside Blue Lan in the 2014 TTV series Apple in Your Eye, another project of An Innocent Mistake's writer Mag Hsu, as lead actress Amber An's colleagues. He also landed a leading role as Bazi, the head of a design company in a romantic relationship with Tiffany Ann Hsu's character, in the romance film Design 7 Love. Director Chen Hung-i, who had previously collaborated with Mo on Candy Rain, cast him for his ability to "easily embody characters" and arranged for him to complete internships at a design firm to fully immerse himself in his character. After starring in Designer 7 Love, Mo returned to stage acting and participated in Edward Lam's Dream of the Red Chamber, which was performed in Taiwan that same year and continued its run in Hong Kong the following year. In 2015, he starred in another romance film Elena, which features a love triangle involving Tammy Chen and Kaiser Chuang. He also made a cameo appearance alongside Shih Ming-shuai as special agents from the 1980s in the period drama The Best of Youth. In 2016, Mo received another main role in the CTV series Nie Xiaoqian, a modernized version of the folktale of the same name, where he played an emergency physician who falls in love with the reincarnation of Nie Xiaoqian (played by Annie Chen). After the airing of Nie Xiaoqian, Mo took a six-month hiatus from acting to travel, including attending the Edinburgh International Festival.

=== Breakthrough and critical recognition (2018–present) ===
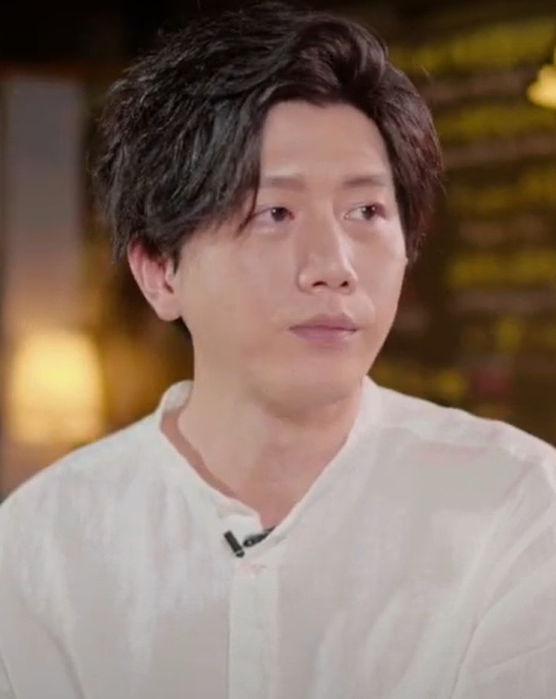
Mo interviewed by Elle Taiwan in September 2020

In 2018, Mo starred as playwright Lu Ho-jo in the autobiographical drama Roseki 1914, which he co-wrote with Lou Yi-an. However, in an interview with The News Lens, Mo noted that most of the screenplay was completed by Lou and that he "only played a small part". Mo described the preparation for playing Lu Huo-jo as "complex", immersing himself in the character by reading his novels and diaries while learning Japanese and Hokkien, languages in which Lu was proficient. He also took singing lessons and learned to play the piano, starting from scratch and dedicating six months to it. He won Best Writing and received a nomination for Best Male Lead in the 53rd Golden Bell Awards with the series. In the same year, he was approached by Cheng Yu-chieh at fellow actor Matt Wu's wedding and offered the chance to collaborate on a project that Cheng and Yang Ya-che were developing, which Mo accepted before the screenplay was finished. This project evolved into the drama film Dear Tenant, which premiered in 2020. In it, Mo played Lin, a tenant suspected of murdering the landlord (played by Chen Shu-fang) to take over the property. He took a six-month hiatus from all work before filming, immersing himself in Lin's lifestyle and learning Lin's hobby mountaineering. Tay Yek Keak of Today found Mo "practically carries" the film with his "greatly restrained, sensitive, and highly nuanced" performance; while Han Cheung at Taipei Times described his performance as "delicate, nuanced", and "hitting just the right notes for his role". His performance also won him both Best Actor in the 22nd Taipei Film Awards and Best Leading Actor in the 57th Golden Horse Awards. Also in 2020, he took on the lead role of Kuo Wei-chiang, a police detective, in the mystery thriller web series Kill for Love, which earned him another nomination for Best Leading Actor in the 55th Golden Bell Awards. He learned acupuncture from a friend who is a Chinese medicine practitioner for the role and performed all the acupuncture scenes on set himself.

In 2021, Mo appeared as Mold, an investigative journalist and one of the six ensemble cast members, in Lou Yi-an's crime film Goddamned Asura. He was nominated for Best Supporting Actor in the 24th Taipei Film Awards with the role, where Lu Hao-ping of Global Views Monthly particularly praised his portrayal among the ensemble, highlighting his "exquisite performance" and acknowledging that he adequately captured the character's complexity. He was then cast as Cheng-hsiu, an astronomer experiencing a midlife crisis, in the drama film Murmur of Memories, which premiered in 2023. In 2024, Mo co-starred in Chung Mong-hong's historical film The Embers alongside Chang Chen, playing a dual role as Mo Hsin-yuan, a victim of the White Terror, and Mo Tzu-fan, Hsin-yuan's son and a factory owner determined to uncover the truth behind his father's murder. To prepare for his role, Mo researched the period of White Terror by reading memoirs and watching documentaries, aiming to interpret and portray the event similarly to South Korea's Gwangju uprising. He received a nomination for Best Supporting Actor in the 61st Golden Horse Awards, with Okapi's Ma Hsin calling it a "standout performance in his career". He announced that he would join the production of the eight-hour stage play A Dream Like A Dream, directed by Stan Lai, in the same year. Mo also co-led Lou Yi-an's drama series Our Bar with Janel Tsai and Yang Kuei-mei, which premiered at the 2024 Golden Horse Film Festival and made available for streaming in May 2025. He portrayed an award-winning bartender Jung who loses his sense of taste, with Chien Ying-jou of United Daily News described his performance as "relaxed" and "reminiscent of his work in stage comedies". Prior to production, he spent a year interning at a bar and contributed advice on the set design.

== Personal life ==
Mo has been dubbed by the media as leading a "low-profile life". He has expressed disdain for capitalism in the film industry, rejecting all commercial films, advertisements, and promotional activities, and he has never attended premieres. He also does not use social media. Mo has voiced his aversion to the press, refusing interviews during the early years of his career, but he began to be more open to interviews starting in the 2020s, considering it a way to "attract greater exposure" for his work.

Mo began suffering from insomnia due to academic pressure during his university years, and he has struggled with it for over 15 years. On 8 November 2017, he published a prose anthology The Person with Insomnia, featuring 41 essays he wrote during sleepless nights. He cited the works of playwright Chen Ming-chai as his inspiration for the book. In July 2018, he adapted it into a stage play, in which he starred alongside Huang Yu-siang, and the play continued its run until May 2022. Mo married a woman outside the entertainment industry on 8 July 2022. They did not hold a wedding ceremony.

== Filmography ==
=== Film ===
Year	Title	Role	Notes/Ref.
1999	Spring Cactus	Cheng-chen (承真)	
2002	Somewhere Over The Dreamland	Hsiao-mo (小莫)	
2006	Do Over	Lixiang (立翔)	
2007	The Most Distant Course	Xiao Tang (小湯)	
2008	Candy Rain	Summer's husband	
2009	A Place of One's Own	Mozi (莫子)	
2009	Pinoy Sunday	Husband in apartment	Cameo
2010	Tears	Black Eyes (黑目)	
2010	Forever	Gin Lee	
2010	Snowfall in Taipei	Jack	
2012	Cross	Woo (葉永禾)	
2013	Canopy	Seng (阿盛)	
2013	The Losers	Hsiang (阿祥)	Cameo
2014	Design 7 Love	Bazi (霸子)	
2015	Elena	Kevin	
2020	Dear Tenant	Lin Jian-yi (林健一)	
2021	Goddamned Asura	Mold (黴菌)	
2023	Murmur of Memories	Cheng-hsiu (葉承修)	
2023	Totto-Chan: The Little Girl at the Window	Moritsuna Kuroyanagi (黒柳守綱)	Mandarin voice dub
2024	The Embers	Mo Hsin-yuan / Mo Tzu-fan (莫聲遠 / 莫子凡)	

=== Television ===
Year	Title	Role	Notes/Ref.
1999	The Pact of Choshui River	Li Ming-nan (李明南)	Main role; television film
2002	Watan's Wine Bottle	Hsiao-mo (小莫)	Main role; television film
2003	Wintry Night II	Liu Ming-ji (劉明基)	Main role
2006	Mico, Go!	Shih Yuan (石原)	Main role
2008	Artemisia	Sung Hai (宋海)	Main role; television film
2011	Jiong Ien Sen	Wan Tsun-pin (萬俊斌)	Main role
2011	Son, My Love Forever	Hsiao Chi-chien (蕭智謙)	Main role
2012	An Innocent Mistake	Cheng Yu-en (鄭予恩)	Main role
2014	Apple in Your Eye	Chang Chi-hsun (張志勳)	Cameo
2015	The Best of Youth	1980s special agent	Cameo
2016	Nie Xiaoqian	Ling Cheng-hsi (凌承熙)	Main role
2018	Roseki 1914	Lu Ho-jo	Main role; also as writer
2020	Kill for Love	Kuo Wei-chiang (郭偉強)	Main role
2024	Our Bar	Jung (阿榮)	Main role

== Awards and nominations ==
Year	Award	Category	Work	Result	Ref.
2000	35th Golden Bell Awards	Best Male Lead in a Television Series	The Pact of Choshui River	Nominated	
2002	37th Golden Bell Awards	Best Supporting Actor in a Miniseries or Television Film	Watan's Wine Bottle	Nominated	
2008	43rd Golden Bell Awards	Best Leading Actor in a Miniseries or Television Film	Artemisia	Nominated	
2013	48th Golden Bell Awards	Best Male Lead in a Television Series	An Innocent Mistake	Nominated	
2018	53rd Golden Bell Awards	Best Male Lead in a Television Series	Roseki 1914	Nominated	
2018	53rd Golden Bell Awards	Best Writing for a Television Series	Roseki 1914	Won	
2020	22nd Taipei Film Awards	Best Actor	Dear Tenant	Won	
2020	55th Golden Bell Awards	Best Leading Actor in a Miniseries or Television Film	Kill for Love	Nominated	
2020	57th Golden Horse Awards	Best Leading Actor	Dear Tenant	Won	
2021	2nd Taiwan Film Critics Society Awards	Best Actor	Dear Tenant	Won	
2021	15th Asian Film Awards	Best Actor	Dear Tenant	Nominated	
2022	24th Taipei Film Awards	Best Supporting Actor	Goddamned Asura	Nominated	
2024	61st Golden Horse Awards	Best Supporting Actor	The Embers	Nominated	
