= The King of Blaze =

The King of Blaze may refer to:

- The King of Blaze (manhua), a Taiwanese comic book series
  - The King of Blaze (TV series), a 2018 Chinese television series based on the manhua
