= Melancholic Princess =

- Cover of the second original edition volume 1 published by Da Ran Culture, featuring the main character Li Ying.

古鏡奇譚第一章：傾國怨伶 Chʻing-kuo Yüen-ling; Qīng guó yuàn líng
- Genre: Action; Adventure; Contemporary fantasy Historical fantasy Romance; Supernatural
- Author: You Su-lan
- Illustrator: You Su-lan
- Publisher: (Taiwan) Hua Shang Culture (1990); Da Ran Culture (1991); Kung Long Int. (2001); Rye Field Publishing (2012, box set)
- Other publishers: (Hong Kong) Fun-Lok Publishing (Singapore) Chuang Yi (Vietnam) Tre Publishing House (South Korea) Bluebird Book Publishing, Seoul Media Land
- Magazine: (Taiwan) Weekend Comics
- Original run: 1989
- Collected volumes: 4 (first edition); 5 (new edition)

Melancholic Princess (Chinese: 傾國怨伶; pinyin: Qīng guó yuàn líng; Wade–Giles: Ching^{1}-kuo^{2} Yüen^{4}-ling^{2}; Zhuyin Fuhao: ㄑㄧㄥ ㄍㄨㄛˊ ㄩㄢˋ ㄌㄧㄥˊ; lit. 'Melancholic Beauty in the Han-ling Palace Hall') is a Taiwanese comic book series (called manhua in Taiwan) written and illustrated by the comic artist You Su-lan, serialized in Weekend Comics since 1989 and published by Da Ran Culture in 1991. The series is the 1st installment of The Seven Mirrors' Stories collection, followed by The King of Blaze.

== Plot summary ==
Ling-ling Mausoleum (唐靈陵), an untouched Tʻang dynasty (7th century) tomb is discovered by Robert, an American journalist and a close friend of Wei Yung-chʻien's father, who is a Taiwanese-American archaeologist living in New York City. Joined by another friend, the four travel to mainland China to inspect the mausoleum. The occupant is a mysterious princess whose name has never been recorded in any historical documents, and who appears in Yung-chʻien's recurring dreams. The resurrection of the princess leads to a series of other startling revelations which put Yung-chʻien in unpredictable danger.

== Main characters ==
Hua Chʻêng (嫿琤)

Goddess of Water, the love of Shang Hsüan. She is the only female among the seven gods.

Li Ying (李盈)

Hua Chêng's first reincarnation in the Tang dynasty, princess of Kuang-yü (廣玉公主), fictional daughter of Emperor Kao-tsung and Empress Wu Tsê-tʻien, who falls in love with Hao Yüeh. She has supernatural abilities such as making flowers or other objects fly in the air, also she herself can fly, walk on water, go through walls, etc.

Wei Yung-chʻien (蔚詠倩)

Hua Chêng's second reincarnation (Li Ying's reincarnation) in present day, a 16-year-old Taiwanese-American girl living in New York City, falls in love with Shang Hsüan.

Hao Yüeh (昊玥)

God of Thunder, reincarnated in the Tʻang dynasty as an imperial general and bodyguard of princess Li Ying, the two fall in love with each other.

Shang Hsüan (尙軒)

God of Creation and Universe, the leader of the seven gods. He has a romantic relationship with Hua Chêng.

Robert (勞勃特)

An American journalist and a good friend of Wei Yung-chien's father, who discovered the mausoleum of princess Li Ying.

== List of volumes ==
Second original edition

No.	Original title	(Taiwan) Da Ran Culture	
No.	Original title	Publication date	ISBN
Volume 1	傾國怨伶1	25 September 1991	ISBN 957-25-0910-1
Volume 2	傾國怨伶2	5 October 1991	ISBN 957-25-0911-X
Volume 3	傾國怨伶3	15 October 1991	ISBN 957-25-0912-8
Volume 4	傾國怨伶4	25 July 1991	ISBN 957-25-0913-6

New edition

No.	Original title	Chapter	(Taiwan) Kung Long International Publishing Co.	
No.	Original title	Chapter	Publication date	ISBN
Volume 1	傾國怨伶1	1.Dark Underground Palace; 2.Silhouette in Moon Lights; 3.Surprising Attack; 4.Prophet Shang Hsüan; 5.Confusion	1 January 2001	ISBN 957-0498-15-3
Volume 2	傾國怨伶2	6.A Light Sign; 7.Crying Blue Lotus; 8.The Underground Palace; 9.Dancing with Flowers; 10.The General with a Sword; 10.5.Extra: Be Your Vanguard	1 February 2001	ISBN 957-0498-16-1
Volume 3	傾國怨伶3	11.Anguish Roar; 12.Intermingling; 13.Palace Romance; 14.The Bodyguard; 15.Magic Axes; 15.5.Extra: Look Back Somewhere Quiet	1 March 2001	ISBN 957-0498-17-X
Volume 4	傾國怨伶4	16.Feeling; 17.Love and Death; 18.Waiting Fate; 19.Past; 20.A Broken Dream; 20.5.Extra: Kids Never Lie	1 April 2001	ISBN 957-0498-18-8
Volume 5	傾國怨伶5	21.Dust in Wind; 22.An Ancient Tune; 23.Morning Tide; 24.Long Come and Gone; 25.The Last Chapter: Far and Away+Extra [End]	1 May 2001	ISBN 957-0498-19-6

== Sidequel ==
Cover of Dream of the Tʻang Dynasty Palace, published by Da Ran Culture, featuring Hao Yüeh and Li Ying.

A sidequel of Melancholic Princess titled Dream of the Tʻang Dynasty Palace (Chinese: 唐宮夢) which written and illustrated by the same comic artist and published by Da Ran Culture in 1994, printed in colour. This is a short side story that tells the lonely princess Li Ying felt bored in the palace, so she sneaked out and encountered the shih-kan-tang. The latter thought she is a demoness and ready to kill her, but the general Hao Yüeh saved her just in time.

== Adaptations ==
TV series adaptation

The main characters and portions of Melancholic Princess were used and loosely interpreted, in the 2018 television series adaptation of The King of Blaze. The adaptation is seen to be unsuccessful, and disappointed a number of viewers. It has been questioned by the audience if the series is anything like the manhua except the names of some main characters.

Novel

A novel of the same name written and adapted by Taiwanese author Nalan Chên (納蘭真), was published in 1992.

Original title	Translation	Story	Novel	(Taiwan) Da Ran Culture	
Original title	Translation	Story	Novel	Publication date	ISBN
小說傾國怨伶 上	'Novel Version of Melancholic Princess, vol. 1'	You Su-lan	Nalan Chên	1 November 1992	ISBN 957-72-5187-0
小說傾國怨伶 下	'Novel Version of Melancholic Princess, vol. 2'	You Su-lan	Nalan Chên	1 May 1993	ISBN 957-72-5188-9
