= Candy Rain (film) =

- Directed by: Chen Hung-I
- Written by: Lin Yan-ru; Chen Hung-i; Lin A.D.
- Produced by: Wei Ying-chuan; Chen Hung-i; Zhang Mei-ling
- Starring: Karena Lam; Cyndi Wang; Josephine Hsu; Lu Chia-Hsin; Grace Chen; Belle Hsin; Sandrine Pinna; Waa Wei; Niki Wu; Kao I-Ling; Flora Sun
- Cinematography: Fisher Yu
- Edited by: Chen Hung-i; Liu Chun-Hsiu
- Music by: Chen Chien-Ci
- Production companies: Red Society Films; Quidam Studios
- Distributed by: Three Dots Entertainment
- Release date: 12 September 2008
- Running time: 106 minutes
- Country: Taiwan
- Language: Mandarin

Candy Rain (Chinese: 花吃了那女孩; Wade–Giles: Huā Chīle Nā Nǚhái), also known as 愛情糖果雨 (Chinese: Àiqíng Tángguǒ Yǔ), is a 2008 Taiwanese film directed by Chen Hung-I (陳宏一).

== Plot ==
Candy Rain is a romantic drama which combines four intimate, lyrical tales exploring lesbian relationship in contemporary Taiwan. In the first episode, a young girl escapes a broken love for the uncertainties of friendship (and more) in Taipei. In the second, another girl, seeking her ideal, finds herself involved with a wealthy woman instead. The third story follows a heroine trying to find a balance between marriage and separation from her true love. The final story portrays a volatile foursome anchored by singer-actress Karena Lam. A rich, bittersweet spectrum of love and loss, based on true stories.

== Cast ==
- Karena Lam (林嘉欣) ... Ricky
- Cyndi Wang (王心凌) ... Ricky's girlfriend
- Josephine Hsu (許安安) ... Ricky's ex-girlfriend
- Chia-Hsin Lu (路嘉欣) ... Ricky's ex-girlfriend
- Grace Chen (陳泱瑾) ... Pon
- Belle Hsin (辛佳穎) ... Jessie
- Sandrine Pinna (張榕容) ... U
- Waa Wei (魏如萱) ... Lin
- Niki Wu (吳立琪) ... Spancer
- Kao I-ling (高伊玲) ... Summer
- Mo Tzu-yi (莫子儀) ... Summer's husband
- Flora Sun (孫正華)

== Reception ==
Critical response to the film has been mixed. Kozo of the Love HK Film website called Candy Rain "a light, lesbian-themed art film that's uneven and obvious in execution," but Russell Edwards of Variety gave the film mild praise for its "charming" performances and "gracefully shot" cinematography.
