= Little Tornadoes =

- Directed by: Aaron Wilson
- Written by: Aaron Wilson; Christos Tsiolkas
- Produced by: Aaron Wilson, Susan Schmidt, Ian Anderson, Katrina Fleming
- Starring: Mark Leonard Winter; Silvia Colloca; Robert Menzies; Fabio Motta
- Cinematography: Stefan Duscio
- Edited by: Cindy Clarkson
- Music by: Robert Mackenzie
- Production companies: Left-Handed Productions; Avenue Road Productions
- Distributed by: Umbrella Entertainment (Australia)
- Release dates: 20 August 2021 (Melbourne International Film Festival); 12 May 2022 (Australia)
- Running time: 91 minutes
- Country: Australia
- Languages: English, Italian, Sicilian

Little Tornadoes is a 2021 Australian period drama directed by Aaron Wilson and co-written by Christos Tsiolkas. It stars Mark Leonard Winter and Silvia Colloca, and was filmed along the Murray River in and around the towns of Tocumwal, Cobram, and Mulwala.

== Logline ==
A newly single father's efforts to weather the turbulence of change – in his life and in the world around him – while a new immigrant endeavours to find her place in a foreign land.

== Synopsis ==
Introverted Leo is a metalworker at his small town's local plant. After his wife vanishes, leaving him to care for their two young children, he is bereft – barely able to cook a decent meal or keep the household running. So when a recently arrived Italian colleague suggests that his sister, Maria, act as surrogate homemaker, Leo reluctantly accepts. But can one woman's warm, nurturing presence fill the void left by another, and can Leo yield to the winds of change?

The film distils the many upheavals of 1970s Australia – from immigration and post-war resettlement, to anti–Vietnam War protests and the women's liberation movement – into a narrative about one man's struggle to adapt and a new immigrant endeavouring to find her place in a foreign land. Little Tornadoes is a portrait of a country at a turning point and the human desire for connection.

== Cast ==
- Mark Leonard Winter as Leo
- Silvia Colloca as Maria
- Robert Menzies as Jim
- Fabio Motta as Tony
- Anya Beyersdorf as Camille
- Minnie Liszukiewicz as Maudey
- Freddy Liszukiewicz as Jack
- Julie McGregor as Mrs Baker
- Edwina Wren as Betty
- Brian Simpson as Howard
- Khan Chittenden as Younger Jim

== Production ==
The film was shot over a number of years, with principal photography commencing in late 2009 and additional filming carried out in 2017, 2019, 2020 and 2021. Its story follows on from 2013's Canopy (the director's first feature), set 30 years after that film. Robert Menzies plays the elder Jim in both films.

== Background ==
Wilson has described it as second film in his regional PTSD trilogy. The film, set in 1971 rural Australia, deals with the impact of post-traumatic stress disorder on a family.

Wilson said that he explores themes of masculinity, vulnerability and isolation (physical and emotional) in both Canopy and Little Tornadoes. His paternal grandmother, who lived on the family farm during his childhood, became a strong influence in Wilson's life and his storytelling.

== Release ==
Little Tornadoes had its world premiere at the 2021 Melbourne International Film Festival (albeit online only due to Melbourne's COVID-19 pandemic lockdown), and went on to screen at Brisbane International Film Festival, CinefestOZ and the Antipodean Film Festival in St Tropez.

The film was released in Australian cinemas on 12 May 2022.

== Reception ==
On Rotten Tomatoes, a review aggregator, the film has a score of 71% based on 7 reviews.

The Guardian's Luke Buckmaster gave the film 4-stars, saying “Wilson builds an intensely thoughtful space to contemplate mental health among Australian men, particularly those living in rural communities where there are higher rates of anxiety, depression and suicide. Absorbing period drama.”

The ABC Screen Show's Larissa Behrendt called the film “One of my favourites of the year. I love this depiction of a small town swept up in change.” The Today Show's Richard Wilkins calls Little Tornadoes “a fabulous film. A film that pushes a lot of buttons.”

Annika Morling writes in Metro Magazine: “In its portrayal of two women who choose to vanish from a town, Little Tornadoes offers a subtle inversion of the colonial myth of the bush as treacherous labyrinth and the town as sanctuary.” While Screenhub's Stephen A Russell says the "emotionally complex feature explores the long shadow of war in 1970s Australia.”

It received an honourable mention as one of ACMI's Best Films of 2021, and was selected as one of The Guardian’s “Top 10 Australian Films of 2022”.

== Accolades ==
- Best Direction in a Feature Film < $1M (2022 Australian Directors' Guild Awards)

== Soundtrack ==
The film's soundtrack features a mix of Original Score by composer Robert Mackenzie and period Australian and Italian songs. Prominent tracks include Love Song by Olivia Newton-John, A World of Our Own by The Seekers, The Olive Tree by Judith Durham, Vitti 'na Crozza by Amalia Rodrigues, Santa Lucia by Robertino Loreti, and new track Little Tornadoes by Sal Kimber and Simon Lewis.
