= A Big Deal =

- Film poster
- Traditional Chinese: 巨額交易
- Simplified Chinese: 巨额交易
- Hanyu Pinyin: Jù'é Jiāoyì
- Directed by: Ma Liwen
- Written by: Ma Liwen
- Produced by: Wang Dawei
- Starring: Qiao Renliang; Lan Cheng-lung; Han Chae-young; Chapman To
- Cinematography: Huang Lian
- Edited by: Zhang Jia
- Music by: An Wei
- Production companies: Beijing Radio and Television Media Co., Ltd. Dadu Group; Le Vision Pictures; New Film Association
- Distributed by: Le Vision Pictures; New Golden Age Entertainment
- Release date: 2 December 2011
- Running time: 100 minutes
- Country: China
- Language: Mandarin

A Big Deal (Chinese: 巨额交易) is a 2011 Chinese adventure comedy film written and directed by Ma Liwen and starring Qiao Renliang, Lan Cheng-lung, Han Chae-young, and Chapman To. The film tells the story of three young people who went to Dubai for a gold rush. The film premiered in China on 2 December 2011.

== Cast ==
- Qiao Renliang as Liu Yijun
- Lan Cheng-lung as Zhang Ze
- Han Chae-young as Zhou Yun
- Chapman To as Wang Yunpeng
- Andy Hui as Yang Yi
- Huang Ling as Xiao Ai
- Tong Yao as Chen Shu
- Ying Zhuang as Sun Fan
- Ye Daying as President Huang
- Xia Fan
- Gong Xinliang
- He Tiehong as Qian Duoduo
- Hu Shufang

== Production ==
Most of the film was shot on location in Beijing, Seoul and Dubai.

== Release ==
A Big Deal was released on December 2, 2011 in China.

== Reception ==
Douban gave the drama 4.7 out of 10.
