= Silvia Colloca =

Singer, actress, author and TV cooking personality

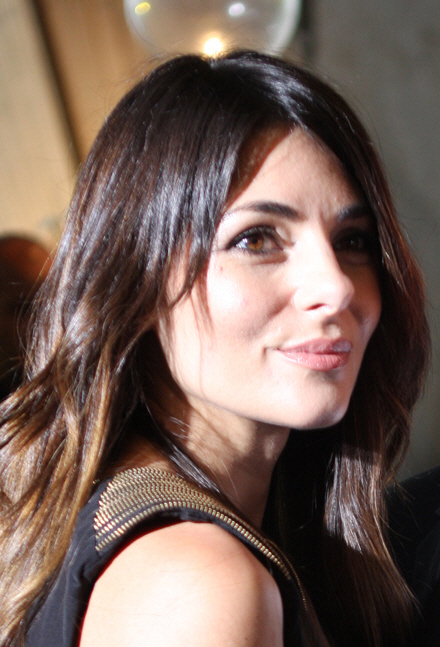
- Colloca in 2012
- Born: 23 July 1977 (age 49); Milan, Italy
- Education: Centro Teatro Attivo, Milan (1997–2000); Étoile Ballet Theatre (1999–2001); Scuola Musicale, Milan (2000–2004)
- Occupations: Actress; producer; opera singer; author; television host; blogger
- Years active: 2002–present
- Spouse: Richard Roxburgh (m. 2004)
- Children: 3

Silvia Colloca (born 23 July 1977) is an Italian-Australian actress, opera singer, cookbook author, and television series presenter. She played Verona in the action horror film Van Helsing (2004), where she met her husband, Australian actor Richard Roxburgh. She is known in Australia for hosting the cookery show Silvia's Italian Table.

== Early life and education ==
Silvia Colloca was born on 23 July 1977 in Milan, Italy, to Loredana and Mario Colloca. Her first job was at a bar in Milan, making cocktails and panini.

From 1997 to 2000, Colloca studied acting at Centro Teatro Attivo in Milan. From 1999 to 2001 she studied dance at Étoile Ballet Theatre. She then trained as an actress and opera singer at Scuola Musicale in Milan for four years, from 2000 to 2004. She has also studied a Science of Education degree.

== Career ==
A mezzo-soprano singer, Colloca began her stage and musical theatre career in Milan, also performing at London Palladium, Berlin’s Tempodrom and Milan’s Teatro Nazionale. She later moved into English language films. Her first major film role was in 2004 American vampire film Van Helsing, alongside Hugh Jackman, Kate Beckinsale and Richard Roxburgh, in which she played Verona, one of Dracula's brides.

In 2006, Colloca starred opposite Wesley Snipes in action film The Detonator and the following year she appeared with Hayden Christensen, Tim Roth and Mischa Barton in romantic comedy Virgin Territory. She then appeared in 2009 British horror-comedy Lesbian Vampire Killers opposite James Corden. From 2009 to 2010, she had guest roles in Australian television series including Packed to the Rafters, Cops L.A.C. and Rake, the latter starring Roxburgh. Then in 2013 she had a role in Australian psychological thriller feature Nerve.

After Colloca's creative projects dried up, she began writing a family recipe blog. The blog, 'Silvia’s Cucina' gained a loyal following, which led to her cookbook Silvia’s Cucina being published in 2013. The following year, her second book Made in Italy was released, closely followed by the 10-part SBS TV series Made in Italy with Silvia Colloca, which saw Colloca take a film crew home to meet her Italian family, showcasing Abruzzo (where her family is from), Marche, and Molise and using her mother's kitchen to present cucina povera (Italian for 'cuisine of the poor'). The series earned her a Logie Award nomination for Most Outstanding Newcomer in 2015.

In 2015, Colloca appeared as Orfeo in Gluck's Orfeo ed Euridice in Sydney, and the following year, she played The Queen in Lindy Hume's production of Snow White for Opera Queensland and La Boite.

Colloca then co-wrote, co-produced, and hosted Silvia's Italian Table, an eight-part reality and cooking series, which debuted on ABC in October 2016. Each episode involved her inviting a group of celebrities to cook and eat with her and engage in entertaining and intelligent conversation. Guests featured were Kathy Lette, Lisa McCune, Tom Gleeson, Magda Szubanski, Matt Moran, Ken Done, Sarah Ferguson, Merrick Watts, Claire Hooper, Amanda Vanstone, Pia Miranda, and Ian Thorpe.

In 2017, Colloca played the recurring role of Lucy Berger in ABC medical drama series Pulse.

In November 2020, Colloca began presenting another 10-part TV series, Cook Like an Italian, which premiered on SBS Food. A second season went to air in April 2021 and then a third in May 2022. During this time, Colloca also co-starred with Mark Leonard Winter in 2021 period drama film Little Tornadoes.

Colloca's debut album Sing Like an Italian, was released by Decca Records in October 2022. She performs four numbers alongside arias and art songs by international singers. The album made its debut at number one on the ARIA Core Classical and Classical/Crossover charts. and was the second biggest album in that genre in Australia in 2022, topping the Classical Charts for over 20 weeks. That same year, she was invited to perform with Italian tenor Andrea Bocelli at his Sydney concert, and her cookbook, The Italian Home Cook, was published.

That same year, Colloca was also cast in the first season of drama series The Twelve, playing Sonia Spears, alongside Sam Neill, Marta Dusseldorp, and Brendan Cowell. This was followed in 2023, by guest roles in two comedy series – Wellmania opposite Celeste Barber and C*A*U*G*H*T with Matthew Fox and Kick Gurry. She then appeared in 2024 sci-fi supernatural horror film, Sting which featured Ryan Corr, Robyn Nevin and Noni Hazelhurst.

In 2024, Colloca's series Silvia's Italian Masterclass, premiered on Network 10. A third season began airing in October 2025.

Colloca launched her own cookware line Per Silvia, in collaboration with Essteele Cookware. She has also been an Ambassador for the Italian Film Festival for several years.

== Personal life ==
Colloca met husband, actor Richard Roxburgh in 2003, at the first script reading for 2004 feature film Van Helsing, in which he played Dracula and she played one of his wives. Colloca recalls: "I was totally enamoured the second I saw him." On 25 September 2004, they were married at the medieval castle of Montalto in Tuscany, Italy.

The couple have two sons and a daughter, the latter of whom was born in 2017. Their boys attended school in Italy for a few months in 2017 and are bilingual.

Colloca became an Australian citizen in July 2013.

== Awards and nominations ==
Year	Work	Award	Category	Result	Ref.
2015	Made In Italy	Logie Awards	Most Outstanding Newcomer	Nominated	
2021	Simple Italian	Booktopia FAB Awards	—N/a	Top 50 Finalist	

== Filmography ==
=== Film ===
Year	Title	Role	Notes	Ref.
2002	Casomai	Cannes award hostess	Uncredited	
2004	Van Helsing	Verona		
2004	L'apocalisse delle scimmie	Tossica		
2006	The Detonator	Nadia Cominski	Direct-to-video film	
2007	Virgin Territory	Sister Lisabetta		
2009	Lesbian Vampire Killers	Carmilla		
2013	Nerve	Elena		
2013	La Finca	The Woman	Short film	
2015	The Tender Dark	Mother	Short film	
2015	Ariadne	Rie Lazic	Short film	
2015	Dante's Hell Animated (aka Inferno Dantesco Animato)	Beatrice (voice)	Animated short film (Italian version)	
2021	Little Tornadoes	Maria		
2023	The Italian Vacation	Dilvia Kolloca	Short film	
2024	Sting	Maria		
2026	Dante's Inferni – The Descent into the Underworld	Beatrice (voice)	Post-production	
TBA	L'Inferno (Remastered)	Beatrice (voice)	Post-production	

=== Television ===
Year	Title	Role	Notes	Ref.
2003	L'avvocato	Tania	6 episodes	
2009	Packed to the Rafters	Verna	2 episodes	
2010	Cops L.A.C.	Gabriella Harrison	1 episode	
2010	Rake	Sonia Dana	1 episode	
2014	Made in Italy with Silvia Colloca	Presenter	10 episodes	
2016	Silvia's Italian Table	Presenter	8 episodes	
2017	Pulse	Lucy Berger	3 episodes	
2020–2022	Cook Like an Italian	Presenter	Seasons 1-3, 20 episodes	
2022	The Twelve	Sonia Spears	Season 1, 9 episodes	
2023	Wellmania	Gianna	1 episode	
2023	C*A*U*G*H*T	Princess Depinder	2 episodes	
2024–2025	Silvia's Italian Masterclass	Presenter	Seasons 1-3, 27 episodes	

== Stage ==
Year	Title	Role	Notes	Ref.
2012	Blood Wedding	The Bride	Malthouse Theatre, Melbourne	
2013	The Bull, The Moon and the Coronet of Stars	Marion	Stables Theatre, Sydney, Butter Factory Theatre, Wodonga with Griffin Theatre Co, Merrigong Theatre Co & HotHouse Theatre	
2015	Orfeo ed Euridice	Orfeo	Art Gallery of NSW, Sydney	
2016	Snow White	The Queen	Roundhouse Theatre, Brisbane with Opera Queensland / La Boite for Brisbane Festival	

== Albums ==
Release	Title	Label	Ref.
2022	Sing Like An Italian	Decca Records (4845420)	

== Books ==
Year	Title	Publisher	Ref.
2013	Silvia's Cucina	Penguin Books	
2014	Made in Italy	Penguin Books	
2016	La Dolce Vita	Penguin Books	
2018	Love, Laugh, Bake!	Pan Macmillan	
2021	Simple Italian: The essentials of Italian home cooking	Pan Macmillan	
2022	The Italian Home Cook	Pan Macmillan	
2024	Italian Family Food: Simple Italian food to feed your loved ones	Pan Macmillan	
