= Give Love =

2009 Hong Kong film by Lee Ka-wing and Joe Ma

- Film poster
- Directed by: Lee Ka Wing; Joe Ma
- Written by: Tong Yiu-leung
- Produced by: Leong Tak-Sam; Catherine Hun
- Starring: Gigi Leung; Bolin Chen
- Cinematography: Chan Chor Keung
- Edited by: Matthew Hui
- Music by: Mak Chun Hung
- Production company: BIG Pictures
- Distributed by: Mei Ah Entertainment
- Release date: 14 February 2009
- Running time: 90 minutes
- Country: Hong Kong
- Language: Cantonese

Give Love (simplified Chinese: 爱得起; traditional Chinese: 愛得起) is a 2009 Hong Kong romantic comedy film directed by Lee Ka Wing and Joe Ma.

== Plot ==
Yat-tong (Bolin Chen) has got a new flatmate named Leslie (Gigi Leung). Unfortunately Leslie soon gets divorced by her husband and is deeply immersed in sorrow. With Yat-tong's company, she breaks away from the past and starts her new life. They get along so well that they start turning into something more than friends, everyone around expects they will fall in love sooner or later. Maybe in just a matter of time. However, they have a large barrier. Leslie's ex-husband is the elder brother of Yat-tong. That means, they are ex-in-laws.

== Cast ==
- Gigi Leung as Leslie Chan
- Bolin Chen as Yat-tong
- Shao Bing
- Shaun Tam
- Fan Siu-Wong
- Crystal Cheung, Regen Cheung and Winkie Lai
- Hui Siu-Hung
- Emily Kwan
