= Canopy (film) =

2013 film directed by Aaron Wilson

- Directed by: Aaron Wilson
- Written by: Aaron Wilson
- Produced by: Katrina Fleming, Aaron Wilson
- Starring: Khan Chittenden; Mo Tzu-yi
- Cinematography: Stefan Duscio
- Edited by: Cindy Clarkson
- Music by: Nic Buchanan; Rodney Lowe
- Production companies: Finer Films; Chuan Pictures
- Distributed by: Odin's Eye Entertainment (Australia) monterey media (USA)
- Release dates: 10 September 2013 (Toronto International Film Festival); 24 April 2014 (Australia); 29 August 2014 (United States)
- Running time: 84 minutes
- Country: Australia/Singapore
- Languages: Mandarin, Hokkien, Japanese. English

Canopy is a 2013 Australian/Singaporean psychological suspense war film, written and directed by Aaron Wilson and starring Khan Chittenden and Mo Tzu-yi. Set against the backdrop of the Battle of Singapore in World War II, the film is nearly wordless.

== Plot ==
In 1942, during war between the Allies and the Japanese rages in the jungles of Singapore. Jim (Khan Chittenden), a Flight Lieutenant in the Royal Australian Air Force, awakens to find himself hanging from a tree by his parachute, after having been shot down. Disentangling himself he realises that he has lost his pistol, his only form of defence but manages to salvage his survival gear and sets off into the jungle, narrowly avoiding a Japanese patrol.

Making his way through mud, swamp and a field full of Japanese propaganda leaflets, he eventually runs into Chinese Dalforce guerrilla fighter Seng (Mo Tzu-yi), who had been separated from his unit behind enemy lines. They have another close encounter with a Japanese patrol and elect to set off together to aid each other in reaching friendly territory, despite not being able to speak the other's language.

Early on in their travels Seng is aggrieved to find the body of a comrade he was close to. They are briefly separated when Jim is left to contemplate the scene but he is alerted to Seng's location by the sound of gunfire. Jim is forced to rush to Seng's aid as the guerrilla collapses from a gunshot sustained to the abdomen, the Australian being forced to perform emergency surgery to retrieve the bullet with only bare hands and his sparse survival kit while simultaneously having to keep Seng silent to avoid the attention of the Japanese patrol. Jim rips off part of his pants and wraps it around Seng's waist and wound.

Later in the night, flashbacks of his hours in the jungle are interrupted as Seng wakes Jim to alert him to another Japanese patrol walking right by them, before the pair are briefly forced to fight off venomous insects from the tree which they had been sleeping under. As they settle back under the tree for the night, Seng pulls out an item from Jim's pant leg pocket tied around his waist. It's a photo of Jim's family, causing him to drift into a reverie remembering his wife back home. Jim awakens from his memories to find it is the next morning. He and Seng share a moment together in which they finally learn each other's names before Japanese soldiers find and separate them. As Seng is killed in cold blood by the patrol's officer, the Japanese drag Jim away to a truck and he is driven off to the Japanese base. He watches helplessly out of the back of the truck, knowing that his bid for freedom has finally failed. A time skip then shows Jim back home in Australia, standing motionless in a field of wheat, as the sounds of the Singapore creep back in again.

== Cast ==
- Khan Chittenden as Jim
- Mo Tzu-yi as Seng
- Robert Menzies as older Jim
- Edwina Wren as Betty

== Production ==
Director Aaron Wilson developed the script while he was undertaking a filmmaker residency program with Objectifs Centre for Filmmaking and Photography in Singapore.

Filming took place over a period of two weeks in Singapore, in and around locations where actual fighting took place during the Japanese invasion of February 1942. These areas included Sungei Buloh wetlands, Bukit Brown Chinese Cemetery and MacRitchie Reservoir. Additional filming was carried out in Australia in New South Wales, close to the township of Tocumwal.

Post-production of the film was partly financed using crowdfunding through Pozible.

== Release ==
Canopy had its world premiere at the 2013 Toronto International Film Festival, and was selected for screening at other major film festivals, including Busan International Film Festival, Shanghai International Film Festival and International Film Festival Rotterdam.

== Reception ==
On Rotten Tomatoes, a review aggregator, the film has a score of 75% based on 33 reviews.

== Accolades ==
- Jury Grand Prix, Best feature film – 2014 Antipodes Film Festival Saint Tropez
- Best Director – Festival International de Cinéma en Champagne-Ardenne 2014
- Special Jury Mention – Abu Dhabi Film Festival 2013

== Soundtrack ==
A soundtrack album was released comprising atmospheric music from and inspired by the film and its tropical jungle setting, composed by Melbourne musical artist Auromaya.

== Sequel ==
Aaron Wilson's second film, Little Tornadoes (2021) is a narrative continuation of Canopy, with Robert Menzies reprising the role of the elder Jim.
