= Snowfall in Taipei =

2010 film by Huo Jianqi

- Film poster
- Traditional Chinese: 台北飄雪
- Simplified Chinese: 台北飘雪
- Hanyu Pinyin: Táiběi Piāoxuě
- Directed by: Huo Jianqi
- Written by: Chikayo Tashiro; Su Xiaowei
- Based on: Snowfall in Taipei by Chikayo Tashiro
- Produced by: Tomoko Fushimi; Jeffrey Chan; Michelle Yeh; Yu Dong; Hideki Kawamura; Shironori Kawasaki; Tomoharu Kusunoki; Liu Jing; Zhang Hao
- Starring: Chen Bolin; Tong Yao; Mo Tzu-yi; Tony Yang
- Cinematography: Sun Ming; Li Dahai
- Edited by: Yan Tao
- Music by: An Wei
- Production companies: Go! Cinema; Polybona Films
- Distributed by: Polybona Films; Distribution Workshop; Three Dots Entertainment Company; Innoform Media
- Release dates: 20 February 2010 (Japan); 15 September 2011 (Taiwan); 1 April 2012 (China); 3 May 2012 (Hong Kong)
- Running time: 106 minutes
- Countries: China; Japan; Hong Kong; Taiwan
- Languages: Mandarin; English

Snowfall in Taipei (Chinese: 台北飘雪) is a 2010 romance film directed by Huo Jianqi and starring Chen Bolin, Tong Yao, Mo Tzu-yi, and Tony Yang. A Chinese-Hong Kong-Taiwanese-Japanese co-production, the film is based on the Japanese novel of the same name by Chikayo Tashiro. The film premiered in Japan on February 20, 2010.

== Plot ==
Xiao Mo (Chen Bolin) is a young man living in Jingtong, an ancient town in Pingxi District, New Taipei City, Taiwan. One day, a Shandongese pop singer May (Tong Yao) is announced missing in Taipei, but soon appears in Xiao Mo's town. With a voice problem and desperate to hide herself, she seeks help from Xiao Mo, who offers her a place to stay, a job in a local restaurant, and takes her to a doctor for treatment. As time passes by, Xiao Mo finds himself in love with May, however, May loves Ah Lei, who is her producer.

== Cast ==
- Chen Bolin as Xiao Mo
  - Yue-Tang Tommy Wang as young Xiao Mo
- Tong Yao as May, a singer from Qingdao, Shandong
- Mo Tzu-yi as Jack
- Tony Yang as Ah Lei, May's love interest and producer.
- Teresa Daley as Wen Wen
- Janel Tsai as Lisa
- Wang Juan as Restaurant Proprietress
- Fan Zhuhua as the landlady
- Shih-Chieh King as Master Ma
- Chen Yiting as Xiao Mo's mother

== Soundtrack ==
No.	Title	Lyrics	Music	Singer(s)	Length
1.	"Hand Prophecy (手的预言)" (Opening theme)	Cheer Chen	Cheer Chen	Cheer Chen	01:36
2.	"View the Rain of Taipei in Winter (冬季到台北来看雨)" (Interlude)	Li Ziheng/ Wu Ruoquan	Jin Tiezhang	Meng Tingwei	05:04
3.	"The Meaning of Travel (旅行的意义)" (Interlude)	Cheer Chen	Cheer Chen	Cheer Chen	04:04
4.	"Good Night, Baby (晚安宝贝)" (Interlude)			Wang Qianting
5.	"Too Much (太多)" (Interlude)	Hong Hong	Cheer Chen	Cheer Chen

== Production ==
This film was shot entirely on location in Taipei and Jingtong.

== Release ==
Snowfall in Taipei was released in Japan on February 20, 2010, in Taiwan on September 15, 2011, and in mainland China on April 1, 2012.

== Reception ==
Douban gave the film 5.5 out of 10.

== Box office ==
Snowfall in Taipei grossed 2.07 million yuan in Chinese box office.

== Accolades ==
Date	Award	Category	Recipient(s) and nominee(s)	Result	Notes
2009	22nd Tokyo International Film Festival		Huo Jianqi	Nominated	
2013	13th Chinese Film Media Awards	Most Prominent Performance Award	Chen Bolin	Won	
