= Cross (2012 film) =

2012 Hong Kong film by Daniel Chan, Steve Woo, Lau Kin-ping and Hui Shu-ning

- Film poster
- Traditional Chinese: 第6誡
- Simplified Chinese: 第6诫
- Hanyu Pinyin: Dì Liù Jiè
- Jyutping: Dai6 Leok6 Gaai3
- Directed by: Daniel Chan; Steve Woo; Lau Kin-ping; Hui Shu-ning
- Written by: Daniel Chan; Steve Woo; Lau Kin-ping; Hui Shu-ning
- Produced by: Ramy Choi
- Starring: Simon Yam; Kenny Wong; Liu Kai-chi; Nick Cheung
- Cinematography: Wade Muller
- Music by: Paul Wong
- Distributed by: Fame Universal Entertainment
- Release date: 4 October 2012
- Country: Hong Kong
- Language: Cantonese

Cross (also known as Smile For Me) is a 2012 Hong Kong horror thriller film written and directed by Daniel Chan, Steve Woo, Lau Kin-ping, Hui Shu-ing and starring Simon Yam, Kenny Wong, Liu Kai-chi and Nick Cheung. The film revolves around a Catholic serial killer played by Yam, who after witnessing his wife's death, believes he is given the duty to kill suicidal people to bring them peace and thereby allow them to enter heaven.

== Plot ==
One day, a man brings luggage to a police report room. From the luggage, he takes out some files, a plastic wrapped scalpel and a half-filled vial, one by one, and methodically places them in front of the police while confessing that he killed a man and wants to surrender. He has actually been involved in many murder cases during the past few months.

The man's name is Lee Leung, who claims he is not a serial killer but an angel of God. This is God's test for him, first to have his wife commit suicide to end the pain of leukemia, and then to have him suffer from the pain of losing his wife; if suffering people want to end their lives themselves, they would have to suffer in hell; life and death is a tragedy, and there is no way out.

Lee Leung begins to pay attention to online news stories about suicides and incidentally finds a discussion site about suicide, where people share various methods of committing it, and some would also talk about their reasons for committing it, including some for their family, and others because they have lost the meaning of life. He understands the suffering of people wanting to commit suicide, and believes his mission is to help those people escape from pain. He asked God to give him strength to redeem these suffering people: since they choose to die, he will perform the duty of murder, so the victim can be murdered instead of committing suicide and that they may enter heaven after they die. He meets four suicidal people online and communicates to them one by one and fulfils their wishes. When Lee Leung opines that he is executing for God's will, he finds that his faith and plan of salvation suffers from an impact he is unable to withstand.

== Cast ==
- Simon Yam as Lee Leung
- Kenny Wong as Professor Cheung
- Liu Kai-chi as Mr. Yip
- Mimi Kung as Mrs. Yip / Chan Wai-fong
- Evelyn Choi as Mabel Wong
- Chen Ran as Ai
- Nick Cheung as Mr. Wong
- Pal Sinn as Convicted killer
- Océane Zhu as Lee Leung's wife
- Kageyama Yukihiko as Louis
- Au Hin-wai as Sergeant Wong
- Jason Cheung as Yip Wing-hong/ Jason Chan
- Mo Tzu-yi as Woo
