= The Most Distant Course =

- The Most Distant Course
- Directed by: Lin Jing-jie
- Written by: Lin Jing-jie
- Produced by: Chen Hsiao-tung
- Starring: Gwei Lun-mei; Mo Tzu-yi; Chia Hsiao-kuo
- Release date: November 2, 2007
- Running time: 118 minutes
- Language: Mandarin

The Most Distant Course (Chinese: 最遙遠的距離) is a Taiwanese film written and directed by Taiwanese director Lin Jing-jie, and was released in 2007. It has won the Critics' Week Award in Venice Film Festival in 2007, and was selected as the opening film for 2007 Taipei Film Festival.

== Synopsis ==
Tang (Mo) goes on a trip to Taitung to record the sounds of nature, hoping the tape may save his relationship with his girlfriend who is leaving him. What he does not know, is that she has already moved away and another girl, Yun (Gwei), has moved into that apartment. Yun is trapped in a hopeless love triangle, and troubled by all the issues she faces in life. After listening to the tape that Tang sent, she feels as if the kindness of nature is calling her, and travels to Taitung to find the mysterious man who sends her the tape.

On the other hand, Tsai (Chia), a psychiatrist struggling in a failed marriage, suddenly realizes that he needs to let things go after helping a patient with extramarital affairs. He leaves everything behind and goes to Taitung to search for his ex-lover. The three young souls, with different purposes, comes to the coast and search for the meaning of their life, a journey considerably longer than any of them has taken before.

== See also ==
- Cinema of Taiwan
