= Nothing But Thirty =

2020 Chinese drama television series

- Promotional poster
- Chinese: 三十而已
- Hanyu Pinyin: Sān Shí Ér Yǐ
- Genre: Drama
- Written by: Zhang Yiji
- Directed by: Zhang Xiaobo
- Starring: Jiang Shuying; Tong Yao; Mao Xiaotong
- Country of origin: China
- Original language: Mandarin
- No. of seasons: 1
- No. of episodes: 43

Production
- Executive producer: Xu Xiao'ou
- Production location: Shanghai
- Production companies: Linmon Pictures (Shanghai Ningmeng Film & TV Media Co., Ltd.)

Original release
- Network: Dragon Television; Tencent Video; Anhui Television
- Release: July 17, 2020

Nothing But Thirty (Chinese: 三十而已; pinyin: Sān Shí Ér Yǐ) is a 2020 Chinese drama television series directed by Zhang Xiaobo and starring Jiang Shuying, Tong Yao, and Mao Xiaotong. The series follows the story of three completely different urban women who have reached their thirties while facing challenges at a crucial stage in their lives, as they leave behind their youthful, carefree 20s to embrace the life of a 30-year-old adult, and eventually decide to take matters into their own hands. The series began airing on Dragon Television and Tencent Video on July 17, 2020.

== Plot ==
The series tells about the life of three women with different backgrounds and personalities.

Gu Jia is a strong-willed a housewife and businesswoman that helped her husband become the CEO of a fireworks company, and fought rich housewives who bullied her son. Wang Manni is rebellious and confident at both her workplace as well as home. Zhong Xiaoqin is content with her average life, a normal job, and a husband who likes fish.

However, their lives are suddenly disrupted by external factors. Gu Jia begins to suspect her husband Xu Huanshan of having a young mistress, Wang Manni faces difficulties with sales and relationships, and Zhong Xiaoqin's idea of a perfect marriage is destroyed.

== Cast ==
=== Main ===
- Jiang Shuying as Wang Manni (王漫妮), a senior saleswoman at Mishil.
- Tong Yao as Gu Jia (顾佳), Xu Huanshan's determined and intelligent wife.
- Mao Xiaotong as Zhong Xiaoqin (钟晓芹), Chen Yu's wife who works as an employee at a property management company.

=== Supporting ===
- Yang Le as Chen Yu (陈屿), Zhong Xiaoqin's husband who works as an executive editor of the Breaking News Department of a TV station.
- Li Zefeng as Xu Huanshan (许幻山), a nerdy designer and then the CEO of a fireworks company, husband of Gu Jia.
- Yang Lixin as Gu Jinghong (顾景鸿), Gu Jia's father.
- Yan Zidong as Zhong Xiaoyang (钟晓阳), Zhong Xiaoqin's boyfriend.
- Edward Ma as Liang Zhengxian (梁正贤), an Asian-American businessman and playboy who is the boyfriend of Wang Manni.
- Zhang Yue as Lin Youyou (林有有), an amusement park employee and Xu Huanshan's mistress.
- Mao Yi as Jiang Chen (姜辰), Wang Manni's ex-boyfriend who owns a café.
- Wang Zijian as Zhang Zhi (张志), Wang Manni's boyfriend who serves as director of Quzhou's local government.
- Samantha Ko as Zhao Jingyu (赵静语), Liang Zhengxian's fiancée.
- Dai Jiaoqian as Miss Lu (陆姐), Chen Yu's superior.
- Yang Xinming as Uncle Yu (于伯), a barber in Quzhou.
- Yang Yuting as Mrs. Wang (王太太), a wealthy woman who is friends with Gu Jia.
- Cai Die as Xiao Bai (小白)
- Fu Miao as Boss
- Walley Wei as Zoe
- Wiyona Yeung Lau Ching as Amanda, a Hong Kong salesperson at Mishil.
- Tian Yitong as Daisy, the assistant head salesperson at Mishil.
- Wang Renjun as father of Shen Jie (沈杰), Xu Huanshan's friend who owns a fireworks company.

== Production ==
The name "Sān Shí Ér Yǐ" (三十而已) based on a sentence "As thirty, I stood firm" (三十而立) comes from Analects.

== Reception ==
Nothing But Thirty received mainly positive reviews. Douban gave the drama 6.6 out of 10.

=== Ratings ===
- Highest ratings are marked in red, lowest ratings are marked in blue

Episode #	Broadcast date	Dragon TV CSM59 city network ratings		
Episode #	Broadcast date	Ratings (%)	Audience share (%)	Rank
1-2	July 17, 2020	0.875	3.115	5
3	July 18, 2020	1.219	4.643	4
4-5	July 19, 2020	1.492	5.289	4
6-7	July 20, 2020	1.474	5.585	3
8-9	July 21, 2020	1.454	5.355	3
10-11	July 22, 2020	1.56	5.735	3
12-13	July 23, 2020	1.516	5.592	3
14-15	July 24, 2020	1.131	4.084	4
16	July 25, 2020	1.173	4.501	4
17-18	July 26, 2020	1.469	5.327	3
19-20	July 27, 2020	1.682	6.128	2
21-22	July 28, 2020	1.719	6.428	2
23-24	July 29, 2020	1.668	6.183	2
25-26	July 30, 2020	1.816	6.618	2
27-28	July 31, 2020	1.867	6.517	1
29	August 1, 2020	1.726	6.374	2
30-31	August 2, 2020	1.894	6.941	1
32-33	August 3, 2020	1.837	6.685	2
34-35	August 4, 2020	1.921	6.945	2
36-37	August 5, 2020	1.176	4.265	4
38-39	August 6, 2020	1.676	6.064	2
40	August 7, 2020	1.467	5.448	2
41	August 8, 2020	1.387	5.266	2
42-43	August 9, 2020	1.643	5.924	1
Average ratings		1.535	5.625	—N/a

== Awards and nominations ==
Award	Category	Nominated work	Result	Ref.
27th Shanghai Television Festival	Best Television Series	Nothing But Thirty	Nominated	
27th Shanghai Television Festival	International Communication Award	Nothing But Thirty	Won	
27th Shanghai Television Festival	Best Director	Zhang Xiaobo	Nominated	
27th Shanghai Television Festival	Best Original Screenplay	Zhang Yingji	Nominated	
27th Shanghai Television Festival	Best Actress	Tong Yao	Won	
27th Shanghai Television Festival	Best Supporting Actress	Mao Xiaotong	Nominated	
27th Shanghai Television Festival	Best Supporting Actor	Li Zefeng	Nominated	
