= To Love Somebody (2014 film) =

- Directed by: Francis Sung
- Starring: Tong Yao; Shen Lin; Qiao Zhenyu; Michael Tong
- Release date: May 16, 2014
- Running time: 103 minutes
- Country: China
- Language: Mandarin
- Box office: US$0.58 million

To Love Somebody (Chinese: 求爱嫁期) is a 2014 Chinese romance film directed by Francis Sung.

== Cast ==
- Tong Yao
- Shen Lin
- Qiao Zhenyu
- Michael Tong
- Tong Lei
- Fang Zibin
- Zhao Siyuan
- Li Chengyuan
- Wang Yi
- Ma Xiaocan
- Liang Dawei
- Gilbert Lam
- Zhang Xiaojue
- Liu Yizhou
- Qi Ji
- Francis Sung

== Reception ==
The film has grossed US$0.58 million at the Chinese box office.
