= The King of Blaze (manhua) =

Taiwanese comic book series

- Cover of the original traditional Chinese edition volume 7 published by Da Ran Culture, featuring the two main characters Chung Tien and Ssŭ-tu Fêng-chien.

古鏡奇譚之二：火王 Huo^{3}-Wang^{2}; Huǒ wáng
- Genre: Action, contemporary fantasy, historical fantasy, romance, supernatural
- Author: You Su-lan
- Illustrator: You Su-lan
- Publisher: Da Ran Culture, Taiwan (1992); Kung-Long Int. (2001; 2019, e-book)
- Other publishers: Chuang Yi, Singapore Burapat Comics. Thailand Seoul Media Land, South Korea Tre Publishing House, Vietnam
- Magazine: Gong Juu Comics, Taiwan
- Original run: 1991
- Collected volumes: 13 (first edition); 14 (new edition)

The King of Blaze, also known as Fire King (Chinese: 火王; pinyin: Huǒwáng; Wade–Giles: Huo^{3}-Wang^{2}; Zhuyin Fuhao: ㄏㄨㄛˇ ㄨㄤˊ; lit. 'Fire King' or 'The King of Fire'; Dutch: De Brand Koning (Note: De Brand Koning means 'The Fire King', appearing on the cover of each volume of the first edition published by Da Ran Culture. The reason for using a Dutch title is unknown.)), is a Taiwanese comic book series (called manhua in Taiwan) written and illustrated by the comic artist You Su-lan, serialized in Gong Juu Comics (Princess Comic Magazine) since 1991 and published in tankōbon format by Da Ran Culture from 1992 to 1998. The series is the 2nd installment of The Seven Mirrors' Stories collection, and is considered to be one of Taiwan's first danmei comics.

== Plot summary ==
The story takes place three years after the disappearance of the mausoleum of Li Ying, a fictional Tang dynasty imperial princess (see Melancholic Princess) who is the past life of Wei Yung-chien. Yung-chien meets Teles Connelly Downey, a Dutch-American entrepreneur and CEO based in New York City who is the reincarnation of Chung Tien, the god of fire (king of blaze), and they both share a familiar feeling with each other.

Yung-chien continues her search for the seven bronze mirrors that represent the seven gods, with the hope to find Shang Hsüan again. Meanwhile, Downey's memories of his past life in the Tang dynasty (7th century) begin to surface, in that life when he met his twin flame Ssŭ-tu Fêng-chien, an elegant and exquisite fortune teller who is the reincarnation of Chien Mei, the god of wind. Initially, Chung Tien didn't recognise that he has been one of the seven gods in their first past lives due to his cross-dressing and stunning feminine look.

Fêng-chien was wounded by the gold phoenix hairpin made by Chung Tien, as no one can survive being wounded by his metalwork... Will Chung Tien find him again no matter how many centuries pass? How does Downey fit into this never-ending wheel of fate?

== Characters ==
=== Main characters ===
Chung Tʻien (仲天)

God of Fire, the King of Blaze with red hair, despite this, he has been known as a cold-hearted one among all the seven gods. His first reincarnation in the Tʻang dynasty is a red-haired and blue-eyed Caucasian blacksmith from the Western Regions, he meets his twin flame Ssŭ-tʻu Fêng-chien in this life. Teles (Terlirice) Connelly Downey is his second reincarnation in contemporary era, a Dutch-American CEO based in New York City. According to the author, the physical appearance of this character was inspired by the Dutch-Swedish model Marcus Schenkenberg.

Chʻien Mei (千湄)

God of Wind, a beautiful child with blond hair, he is blind, but can see the threads of fate. First time reincarnated as Ssŭ-tʻu Fêng-chien (司徒奉劍), a famous fortune teller in the Tʻang dynasty, cross-dressed himself as a young lady for keeping a secret that he no longer grew up since the age of 13. Reincarnated in contemporary era as an American teenage psychic named Shannon Arden. He is Chung Tien's soulmate.

Wei Yung-chʻien (蔚詠倩)

A 19-year-old Taiwanese-American girl living in New York City, who falls in love with Shang Hsüan. She is the reincarnation of the imperial princess Li Ying, a fictional character portrayed as the daughter of Emperor Kao-tsung and Empress Wu Tsê-tʻien, who, in turn is the reincarnation of Hua Chêng, the Goddess of Water.

=== Other characters ===
You Hê (優河)

God of Lakes, Chung Tien's love rival. He is mortally wounded by Chung Tien during a fierce confrontation in Tang dynasty because of Chien Mei's reincarnation Ssŭ-tu Fêng-chien. He is the protagonist of the 3rd installment of The Seven Mirrors' Stories series — The Story of Tan Yü (丹聿記).

Hao Yüeh (昊玥)

God of Thunder, reincarnated in the Tʻang dynasty as an imperial general and bodyguard of princess Li Ying, the two fall in love with each other.

Shang Hsüan (尙軒)

God of Creation and Universe, the leader of the seven gods. He has a romantic relationship with Hua Chêng, the Goddess of Water.

Ti Yün (帝昀)

God of Mountains, the only one that has healing ability apart from Shang Hsüan among the seven gods, and the most loyal one to Shang Hsüan.

Flora Orr de Castel (佛羅納·奧爾·德卡斯爾)

A princess of a certain Central European principality (originally an Arab princess of English-Arab descent named Flora Whitall in the first edition), Teles Connelly Downey's fiancée. She is the incarnation of the Mirror of Water.

Olive Contan (歐琳·康特)

Teles Connelly Downey's secretary, has a crush on Teles, but Teles sees her as an elder sister. She was killed by Dore.

Cygnus (西奈)

Originally a reporter, later becomes Teles Connelly Downey's new secretary after the death of Olive Contan.

Robert Fos (勞勃特·佛斯)

An American journalist and a close friend of Wei Yung-chien's father, who discovered the mausoleum of Li Ying in Melancholic Princess.

Frederic Don (費迪沙·唐)

Known as the most expensive killer, works for Teles Connelly Downey.

Chüeh Wên (爵文)

Wei Yung-chʻien's childhood friend, he has a cheerful personality.

Dore (多雷)

Princess Flora's bodyguard, he made a promise that will kill anyone who hurts Flora.

== List of volumes ==
First edition

No.	Title	Literal translation	Da Ran Culture, Taiwan	
No.	Title	Literal translation	Publication date	ISBN
Volume 1	火王再現	The Reappearance of the King of Blaze	1 June 1992	ISBN 957-72-5641-4
Volume 2	赫爾拉娜	Herlana, the Water Mirror	1 December 1992	ISBN 957-72-5128-5
Volume 3	獵謀隱獸	Hunt for the Hidden Beast	1 June 1993	ISBN 957-72-5642-2
Volume 4	曙光前世	Dawn of the Memories of the Past Lives	1 December 1993	ISBN 957-25-0352-9
Volume 5	記憶唐時	The Memories of Tang Dynasty	1 April 1994	ISBN 957-25-0845-8
Volume 6	羽韻蒼飛	The Flying Feathers	1 October 1994	ISBN 957-25-1250-1
Volume 7	如夢隔世	A Dream Between Two Worlds	1 February 1995	ISBN 957-25-1514-4
Volume 8	昭誓今生	A Lifetime Pledge	1 July 1995	ISBN 957-25-1687-6
Volume 9	火焰血誓	The Fiery Blood Vow	1 February 1996	ISBN 957-25-1887-9
Volume 10	浩渺之鷹	The Celestial Hawk	1 December 1996	ISBN 957-25-2601-4
Volume 11	日升月恆	The Eternity	1 July 1997	ISBN 957-25-2864-5
Volume 12	雨過天涯	Rain Over the End of Horizon	1 December 1997	ISBN 957-25-3267-7
Volume 13	永恆的起點	The Eternal Starting Point	1 February 1998	ISBN 957-25-3381-9

New edition

No.	Title	Literal translation	Kung-Long International Publishing Co., Taiwan	
No.	Title	Literal translation	Publication date	ISBN
1	重生之章	The Chapter of Rebirth	1 November 2001	ISBN 957-0498-36-6
2	今塵照命	The Reflection of Destiny	1 December 2001	ISBN 957-0498-39-0
3	曙光前世	Dawn of the Memories of the Past Lives	1 February 2002	ISBN 957-0498-43-9
4	記憶唐時	The Memories of Tang Dynasty	1 March 2002	ISBN 957-0498-49-8
5	羽韻蒼飛	The Flying Feathers	1 April 2002	ISBN 957-0498-50-1
6	凝眸曾經	Eyes on the Past	1 May 2002	ISBN 957-0498-52-8
7	如夢隔世	A Dream Between Two Worlds	1 June 2002	ISBN 957-0498-55-2
8	昭誓今生	A Lifetime Pledge	1 July 2002	ISBN 957-0498-56-0
9	遠颺蒼鷹	The Flying Hawk	1 August 2002	ISBN 957-0498-61-7
10	相會神陵	Reunion in the Divine Mausoleum	1 September 2002	ISBN 957-0498-60-9
11	浩渺來生	Remote Vision of the Afterlife	1 October 2002	ISBN 957-0498-67-6
12	昂首寂寥	No Fear of Loneliness	1 December 2002	ISBN 957-0498-68-4
13	日升月恆	The Eternity	1 January 2003	ISBN 957-0498-74-9
14	終章	The Final Chapter	1 March 2003	ISBN 957-0498-80-3

== Illustrated books ==
Yesterday Once More (TW edition), featuring Chung Tien.

Hold Me to the Dream (TW edition), featuring Chung Tien and Ssŭ-tu Fêng-chien.

Two illustrated books by the same artist derived from The King of Blaze, which contain most of the pictures of the two main characters Chung Tien and Ssŭ-tu Fêng-chien (Chien Mei).

- Yesterday Once More (Chinese: 往日重現; Japanese: 忘れていた夢をもう一度振り返し) is the first picture collection illustrated book, published by Sharp Point Press in 1998. The first edition contains additional products: a collector's box, a large folio poster of Chien Mei and bookplate.
- Hold Me to the Dream (Chinese: 擁我入夢; Japanese: 永遠に私を抱しめて夢の中へ) is the second picture collection illustrated book, published in Taiwan by Sharp Point Press in 1999, and in China by Xinjiang Juvenile Publishing House in 2001. A 40-page hardcover picture book with collector's box.

== TV series adaptation ==
The King of Blaze is adapted into a television series of the same name by Mango TV, which aired on Hunan TV in 2018.

The series received generally negative responses from both critics and audience due to the huge differences between the manhua and its adaptation, and turning the BL (Boys' Love) manhua into a BG (Boy & Girl) drama. Douban gave it a 3.8 out of 10 rating, based on 5141 reviews, indicating "negative reviews". It has been questioned by the audience if the series is anything like the book except the names of some main characters. And the casting and special effects have been criticised for being inappropriate and horrible, respectively.

== Reception ==
The King of Blaze sold 70 thousand each tankōbon volume in Taiwan, and over 30 million collected tankōbon volumes of pirated edition in China, and reprinted 62 times. It was selected as the most popular manhua among Asian comics published in Taiwan (including Hong Kong manhua, Japanese manga, and Korean manhwa) by the Reader's Choice Vote held by the Taiwanese newspaper China Times, in 1997.

In The Application of Comics on General Education: A Study of the Body Implication in the Comics titled "Chingguo-Yuanling" and "Huo-Wang" by Su-Lan Yu, an article published in an academic journal of National Chung Hsing University, the author concludes after a detailed analysis:

The books called Chingguo-Yuanling (Melancholic Princess) and Huo-Wang (The King of Blaze) [...] offered such questions about life as what the importance of the mode of the universal creation is, what the gods are, how the relation of human being with fate and transmigration revolves in time, how we can awake really, how we can work out our individuality effectively, what the relation of human being with nature and the universe is, how we temper with the joy and sorrow of affection, time and space is just what it is now, or it will be in the other way. When the questions being discussed in general education class, no matter what major the student is in, the topics are related with everyone's existence, offering us to think of life, the time and space we are in, and the indefinite possibility. In addition to train the professional knowledge, general education courses aim to educate the students how to enlarge the heart and soul, to enrich our culture, to express ourselves exquisitely, and to find our way in the depressing and confusing world. In a word, the two books use the concept of body to discuss such questions as human being / gods (Nature), fate / transmigration, and breakthrough / awakening, etc. In the seemingly fanciful meditation leading to the mental state, those which are related with the heart and the life may be the way to the universe.
