= The White Haired Witch of Lunar Kingdom =

2014 Chinese-Hong Kong film by Jacob Cheung

- Theatrical poster
- 白发魔女传之明月天国
- Directed by: Jacob Cheung
- Screenplay by: Kang Qiao; Wang Bing; Zhu Yali; Shi He'an; Guo Junli
- Based on: Baifa Monü Zhuan by Liang Yusheng
- Produced by: Huang Jianxin
- Starring: Fan Bingbing; Huang Xiaoming; Vincent Zhao
- Cinematography: Andy Lam
- Edited by: Eric Kwong
- Music by: Peter Kam
- Production company: Bona Film Group
- Distributed by: Bona Film Group
- Release date: 31 July 2014
- Running time: 103 minutes
- Countries: China; Hong Kong
- Language: Mandarin
- Budget: 100 million yuan (US$16 million)
- Box office: US$64.2 million

The White Haired Witch of Lunar Kingdom (白发魔女传之明月天国) is a 2014 wuxia-fantasy film loosely adapted from the wuxia novel Baifa Monü Zhuan by Liang Yusheng. Directed by Jacob Cheung and co-produced by Bona Film Group and Huang Jianxin with Tsui Hark as the creative consultant, the film is a Chinese-Hong Kong co-production and stars Fan Bingbing, Huang Xiaoming, Vincent Zhao, and others in the supporting cast. Originally scheduled for release on 25 April 2014, the film was moved to 1 August 2014, then moved a day earlier to 31 July 2014.

== Synopsis ==
The film is set in 17th-century China during the Ming dynasty. Zhuo Yihang, the newly elected leader of the Wudang Sect, has been tasked with delivering the Red Pill to Beijing as tribute to the Wanli Emperor.

Along the way, Zhuo Yihang meets Lian Nichang, a fierce vigilante who leads an outlaw band. The two, who are initially strangers to each other, end up falling in love and promise to spend the rest of their lives together in her outlaw stronghold.

Later, the jinyiwei attack the outlaw stronghold and point out that Lian Nichang is the one who killed Zhuo Yihang's father Zhuo Zhonglian, who was the governor of Sichuan and Shaanxi.

Zhuo Yihang heads to Beijing alone to find out the truth. Soon after, he pledges allegiance to the Ming government and marries another woman.

Upon learning of Zhuo Yihang's betrayal, Lian Nishang is so filled with grief and anger that her hair turns white overnight.

== Cast ==
- Fan Bingbing as Lian Nichang
- Huang Xiaoming as Zhuo Yihang
- Vincent Zhao as Jin Duyi
- Wang Xuebing as Murong Chong
- Ni Dahong as Wei Zhongxian
- Tong Yao as Ke Pingting
- Li Xinru as Tie Shanhu
- Cecilia Yip as Ling Yunfeng
- Yan Yikuan as Huangtaiji

== Production ==
The White Haired Witch of Lunar Kingdom was produced at a budget of 100 million yuan. Shooting started in November 2012 and ended in March 2013. During filming, Huang Xiaoming had a three-metre fall after a wire accident on the set and he fractured two toes on his left foot. He had to sit in a wheelchair for weeks, but resumed filming even though he had yet to fully recover. On 2 April 2013, Huang and Fan Bingbing attended a press conference in Beijing to talk about their experiences in filming White Haired Witch.

== Reception ==
=== Box office ===
The film grossed US$61,900,000 in mainland China and a total of US$64.2 million internationally.

=== Critical response ===
The film received negative reviews from audiences. The review aggregator Rotten Tomatoes reports a 0 approval rating from critics, with an average score of 4.3/10, based on 6 reviews. The Hollywood Reporter said, "it's a shame that Cheung's first film in seven years is eventually weighed down by this rushed, uneven sprawl of a story credited to five screenwriters, each of whom possibly bringing their own references (ranging from political-parable historical dramas like last year's Life of Ming, to the contemporary dramas like Infernal Affairs) and their perspective in how to make The White Haired Witch connect with a new generation of viewers. Their attempt in reinventing this tale sits uncomfortably with the one central element that couldn't be moved—that is, the troubled (and sloppily presented) romance involving the title character."

On Chinese movie review site Douban, the film has a rating of 3.8/10, based on 51590 viewers. On Mtime.com, it has a score of 5.5 out of 10, based on 13137 viewers.
