= Tong Yao =

Chinese actress (born 1985)

- 童瑶
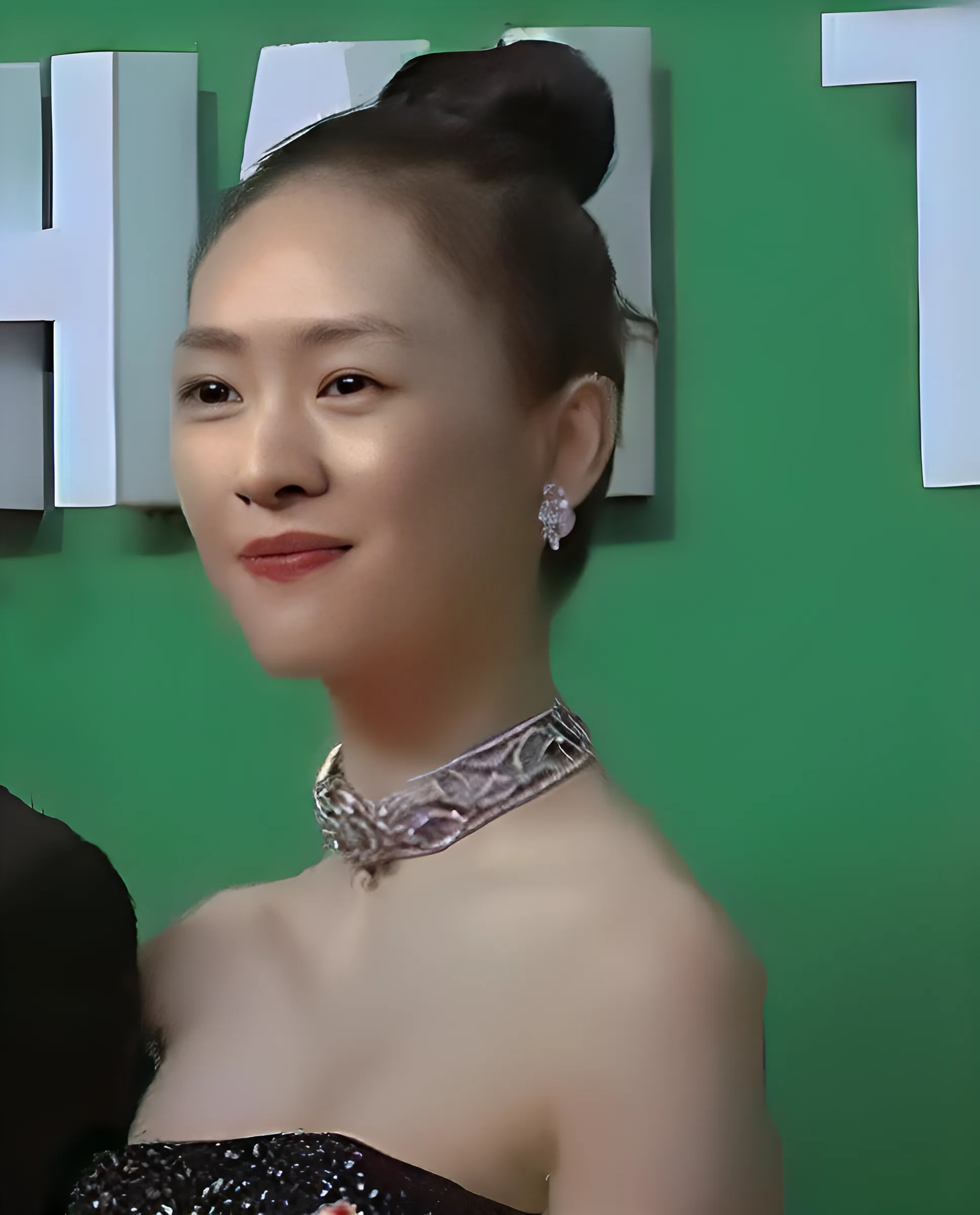
- Tong at the 25th Shanghai Television Festival in June 2019
- Born: August 11, 1985 (age 41); Kunming, Yunnan, China
- Other names: Tanya Tong, Yao Tong
- Education: Central Academy of Drama
- Occupation: Actress
- Years active: 2002–present
- Spouse: Wang Ran (m. 2019)
- Musical career
- Instrument: Hulusi

Chinese name
- Traditional Chinese: 童瑤
- Simplified Chinese: 童瑶
Transcriptions
Standard Mandarin
- Hanyu Pinyin: Tóng Yáo

Tong Yao (Chinese: 童瑶; born 11 August 1985), also known as Tanya Tong, is a Chinese actress, best known in film for portraying Chen Shu in A Big Deal (2011), May in Snowfall in Taipei (2012) and Annie Yang in To Love Somebody (2014), and has received critical acclaim for her television work, particularly as Meng Xizi in Militia Ge Erdan (2012), Zhou Xiaobei in Three Bosom Girls (2014), Song Renping in Like a Flowing River (2018) and Gu Jia in Nothing But Thirty (2020).

== Early life and education ==
On August 11, 1985, Tong was born in Kunming, Yunnan. In 1996, she attended the Chinese Song and Dance Art School in Beijing. She returned to Kunming in the following year, when she was accepted to Kunming Art School. She spent a year studying Hulusi, which is a free reed wind instrument from China and the Shan State. She entered the Central Academy of Drama in 2002, majoring in acting.

== Career ==
In 2002, Tong made her television debut in Tracks In The Snowy Forest, playing a health worker in the Northeast Democratic United Army named Bai Ru.

In 2006, Tong amassed a member of television credits namely My Sun, Walking Duster, and Life of Dragon and Tiger. She had a minor role as Pan Ying in The Young Warriors, a historical television series.

Tong had a cameo appearance in Moonlight Lady (2007), a historical television series based on the real life on Song dynasty poet Li Qingzhao. That same year, she also appeared in Repeat an Error and I Want to Understand You.

In 2008, she co-starred with Lin Shen in the romantic comedy film Afraid to Say Love You, which is her film debut. In the following year, Tong appeared in the film Nine Dragon Jade, in which she played You Erjie.

Her 2010 work includes Simple Dish, Lei Feng, Military Honour, Wind Up the First Pass and Qiao Longbiao. That same year, she starred with Xu Shaoyang in the thriller horror film Snapper.

In 2011, Tong was cast in comedy film A Big Deal.

As lead actress, she co-starred Liu Wei and Ni Ping in the romantic comedy film Wings (2012). And she starred as May, reuniting her with co-star Chen Bolin, who played her romantic interest, in Snowfall in Taipei, a film adaptation based on the Japanese novel of the same name. That same year, she was cast in war drama Militia Ge Erdan, playing the wife of Huang Bo's character.

In 2013, Tong played the female lead role in a business-themed romantic drama film Day of Redemption.

Tong played Annie Yang, the lead role in Francis Sung's directed film To Love Somebody. She had a supporting role in The White Haired Witch of Lunar Kingdom, a fantasy wuxia film. She co-starred with Zhang Xinyi and Jiang Xin in the television series Three Bosom Girls.

In 2015, she played the love interest of Li Chen's character in the television series Boys to Men.

In 2016, three television work she headlined, Stepmother Xu Duoduo, My Spicy Girlfriend and Customize Happiness premiered.

In 2018, Tong starred as a key supporting role in the historical drama Ruyi's Royal Love in the Palace, alongside Wallace Huo and Zhou Xun. She gained popularity for her portrayal of the role as Gao Xiyue. The same year, she starred in the period drama Like a Flowing River. Her performance garnered her the Best Supporting Actress at the Magnolia Awards.

In 2019, Tong was cast in the female-centric modern drama Nothing But Thirty.

In 2020, Tong began filming the spy drama The Rebel.

== Endorsements ==
In September 2020, Tong became the Chinese ambassador for Estée Lauder. From April 2021, she selected as a Giorgio Armani Crossroads brand ambassador, and become brand ambassador for Giorgio Armani in China since August 2022.

On September 21, 2020, lingerie and lifestyle brand NEIWAI officially announced that Tong Yao would become its brand ambassador.

On November 30, 2021, she was announced as a brand ambassador for American luxury jewelry brand Tiffany & Co.

On February 21, 2021, she has been announced as the Giorgio Armani Beauty ambassador in China.

In May 2024, Swiss luxury watchmaker and jeweller Piaget SA announced that Tong has officially joined the Piaget family and become Piaget's brand ambassador in China.

== Personal life ==
On October 1, 2019, Tong and Wang Ran, CEO of private investment bank CEC Capital, married in an ancient castle in Italy.

== Filmography ==
=== Film ===
Year	English title	Chinese title	Role	Notes/Ref.
2008	Afraid to Say Love You	不敢说爱你	Lan Xin	
2009	Nine Dragon Jade	九龙佩	You Erjie	
2009	Snowfall in Taipei	台北飘雪	May	
2010	Snapper	食人草	Xiao Bai	
2011	A Big Deal	巨额交易	Chen Shu	
2012	Wings	最长的拥抱	Xiao Bei	
2013	Day of Redemption	早见，晚爱	Zhou Ting	
2014	To Love Somebody	求爱嫁期	Annie Yang	
2014	The White Haired Witch of Lunar Kingdom	白发魔女传之明月天国	Ke Pingting	
2016	The New Year's Eve of Old Lee	过年好		Cameo
2022	Face's A Verb	对立面		

=== Television series ===
Year	English title	Chinese title	Role	Notes/Ref.
2004	Tracks in the Snowy Forest	林海雪原	Bai Ru	
2006	My Sun	我的太阳		
2006	Walking Duster	行走的鸡毛掸子	Xiu Yu	
2006	Life of Dragon and Tiger	龙虎人生2	Fang Shuqing	
2006	The Young Warriors	少年杨家将	Pan Ying	
2007	Repeat an Error	一错再错	Fang Xiaorui	
2008	Wounded Love	伤情	Zhang Zixuan	
2010	Simple Dish	家常菜	Wen Yuan	
2010	Military Honor	军人荣誉	Wu Xiaoli	
2010	Wind Up the First Pass	风起第一关	Chen Yuanyuan	not broadcast
2011	Qiao Longbiao	桥隆飙	Xiao Bailong	
2011	Lei Feng	雷锋	Ning Xiaohui	
2012	A Unique Militiman	民兵葛二蛋	Meng Xizi	
2013	Single Child's Grandmother and Mother	独生子女的婆婆妈妈	Li Xiaoman	
2013	New Year Picture	大掌门	Shen Fang	
2014	Three Bosom Girls	新闺蜜时代	Zhou Xiaobei	
2015	Boys to Men	爸爸快长大	Wang Shanshan	
2016	Stepmother Xu Duoduo	后妈许多多	Xu Duoduo	
2016	My Spicy Girlfriend	转身遇到你	Wan Xinxin	
2016	Customize Happiness	定制幸福	Tiao Xiaoni	
2016	Hero Dog 2	神犬小七2	Lu Xin	Cameo
2018	Ruyi's Royal Love in the Palace	如懿传	Gao Xiyue	
2018	Qiao's Grand Courtyard 2	乔家大院之光明之路	Lian Hua	
2018	Like a Flowing River	大江大河	Song Renping	
2018	Ever Night	将夜	Li Yu	
2020	Imperfect Love	不完美的她	Gao Shan	
2020	Moonlight Lady	清风明月佳人	Cai Chuchu	
2020	Get Married or Not	我不是结不了婚	Cheng Lu	
2020	Nothing But Thirty	三十而已	Gu Jia	
2021	The Rebel	叛逆者	Zhu Yizhen	
2022	Life Is a Long Quiet River	心居	Gu Qingyu	
2022	Beyond	超越	Li Min	
2022	The Heart of Genius	天才基本法	Yao Yao	
2024	Simple Days	小日子	Gu Moli	
2024	Tender Light	微暗之火	Nan Ya	
2025	Footprints of Change	足迹	Yi Yi	
2025	Those Days	四喜	Shen Mingzhu	
TBA	Amazing Them	了不起的她们		
TBA		实习律师		

== Awards and nominations ==
Year	Award	Category	Nominated work	Results	Ref.
2018	10th China TV Drama Awards	Media Recommended Actor	Ruyi's Royal Love in the Palace	Won	
2019	4th China Quality Television Drama Ceremony	Outstanding Performance Quality Star	—N/a	Won	
2019	25th Shanghai Television Festival	Best Supporting Actress	Like a Flowing River	Won	
2019	7th WenRong TV Awards	Best Supporting Actress	Like a Flowing River	Nominated	
2019	6th The Actors of China Awards Ceremony	Best Actress (Emerald Category)	Like a Flowing River	Nominated	
2019	Golden Bud - The Fourth Network Film And Television Festival	Best Actress	Like a Flowing River	Nominated	
2020	32nd Flying Apsaras Award	Outstanding Actress	Like a Flowing River	Nominated	
2020	30th China TV Golden Eagle Award	Best Actress	Like a Flowing River	Won	
2020	7th The Actors of China Awards Ceremony	Best Actress (Emerald)	—N/a	Nominated	
2020	12th China TV Drama Awards	Outstanding Actress of the Year	Nothing But Thirty; Get Married or Not	Won	
2020	3rd Sir Movie Cultural And Entertainment Industry Awards	Best Actress	Nothing But Thirty	Nominated	
2020	29th Huading Awards	Best Actress	Nothing But Thirty	Nominated	
2020	5th Tencent Video TV And Movie Awards	Quality TV Actor of the Year	Nothing But Thirty	Won	
2020	1st iFeng Film and TV Awards	Best Actress (TV)	Nothing But Thirty	Nominated	
2021	27th Shanghai Television Festival	Best Actress	Nothing But Thirty	Won	
2022	33rd Flying Apsaras Award	Outstanding Actress	The Rebel	Nominated	
2023	6th Television Series of China Quality Ceremony	Quality Charismatic Actor	Life Is a Long Quiet River; Beyond	Won	
