= The Continent (film) =

- Theatrical release poster
- Directed by: Han Han
- Written by: Han Han
- Starring: Feng Shaofeng; Chen Bolin; Wallace Chung; Wang Luodan; Yuan Quan; Joe Chen
- Cinematography: Liao Ni
- Edited by: Xiao Yang; Zhang Weili
- Music by: Takeshi Kobayashi
- Production companies: Beijing Lorry Ltd. Hangzhou Guomai Media Ltd. Bona Film Group
- Release date: July 24, 2014 (China)
- Running time: 100 minutes
- Country: China
- Language: Mandarin
- Box office: US$100.1 million

The Continent (simplified Chinese: 后会无期; traditional Chinese: 後會無期) is a 2014 Chinese road comedy film written and directed by Han Han. It stars Feng Shaofeng and Chen Bolin as inexperienced young men living on an island in the East China Sea as they journey across mainland China. The film was released in China on July 24, 2014.

== Synopsis ==
Three young men, Ma Haohan, Jiang He, and Hu Sheng, live on a small island in eastern China. Facing significant life changes and driven by different motivations, they leave the island, embark on a road trip across the mainland, and set off on an unknown journey of self-discovery.

The journey is both humorous and melancholic. Along the way, they navigate the challenges of friendship, family, and love, encountering a childhood friend still chasing his dreams, a longtime pen pal whose decade-long romance takes an unexpected turn, and a trusting individual who loses everything.

Through these experiences, they undergo profound self-reflection, ultimately altering the course of their lives. While Haohan and Jiang He persist to the journey's end, they each choose vastly different paths forward.

== Cast ==
- Feng Shaofeng as Ma Haohan
- Chen Bolin as Jiang He
- Wallace Chung as A Lu
- Wang Luodan as Su Mi
- Yuan Quan as Liu Yingying
- Joe Chen as Zhou Mo
- Jia Zhangke as San Shu
- Bai Ke
- Kong Lianshun
- Gao Huayang as Hu Sheng

== Production ==
Production began on February 14, 2014, and wrapped on May 26, 2014. The production team scouted from five locations for filming, which included Shanghai, Xichang, Chifeng, Mount Putuo in Zhoushan, and Dongji Island. One of the leads, Feng Shaofeng, was injured when the filming process was nearly finished.

== Release ==
The Continent was produced by Beijing Lorry Ltd, Hangzhou Guomai Media Ltd, and Bona Film Group Ltd. It was released in China on July 24, 2014.
