= Dante's Hell Animated =

- Directed by: Boris Acosta
- Based on: Inferno by Dante Alighieri
- Produced by: Boris Acosta
- Starring: Eric Roberts; Jeff Conaway; Nia Peeples; Vincent Spano; Franco Nero; Riccardo Pratesi; Silvia Colloca; Vittorio Matteucci; Vittorio Gassman
- Edited by: Angelo Acosta
- Music by: Aldo De Tata
- Production company: Gotimna Productions
- Distributed by: Global Film Sales
- Release date: November 24, 2013
- Running time: 39 minutes
- Country: United States
- Languages: English; Italian

Dante's Hell Animated is a 2013 American animated short film produced and directed by Boris Acosta.

The story is based on the first part of Dante Alighieri's Divine Comedy – Inferno.

== Plot ==
This film has two versions, narrated in English and recited in Italian. The Italian version is recited in primitive Italian and Dante Alighieri's own words as he wrote the poem.

Dante gets lost in a dark wood, his way is blocked and he is threatened by three beasts: a lion, a lynx and a she-wolf. Beatrice descends from Heaven into Limbo to ask the poet Virgil to go to Dante's rescue and guide him through Inferno and Purgatorio. The film depicts a chronological descent to the nine circles of hell by Dante and Virgil through the exit into Purgatorio.

== Voice cast – English version ==
- Armand Mastroianni – Introduced by
- Eric Roberts – Dante
- Vincent Spano – Virgil
- Nia Peeples – Beatrice
- Shirly Brener – Entrance Encryption
- Jeff Conaway – Circles Introduction
- Helene Cardona – Francesca
- Sheena Colette – Fury Megaera
- Vanna Bonta – Fury Tisiphone
- Bonnie Morgan – Fury Alecto
- Eve Mauro – Female Demon
- Rico Simonini – Centaur Chiron
- Adrian Paul – Ulysses
- Jose Rosete – Count Ugolino

== Voice cast – Italian version ==
- Dino Di Durante – Introduced by
- Vittorio Gassman – Dante
- Silvia Colloca – Beatrice
- Vittorio Matteucci – Virgil
- Franco Nero – Circles Introduction
- Simona Caparrini – Francesca
- Veronica De Laurentiis – Fury – Tisiphone
- Maude Bonanni – Fury- Megaera
- Susanna Cappellaro – Fury- Alecto
- Gabriel Bologna – Demons
- Arnoldo Foà – Ulysses
- Marco Bonini – Guido da Montefeltro
- Mario Opinato – Count Ugolino
