= Mao Xiaotong =

Chinese actress (born 1988)

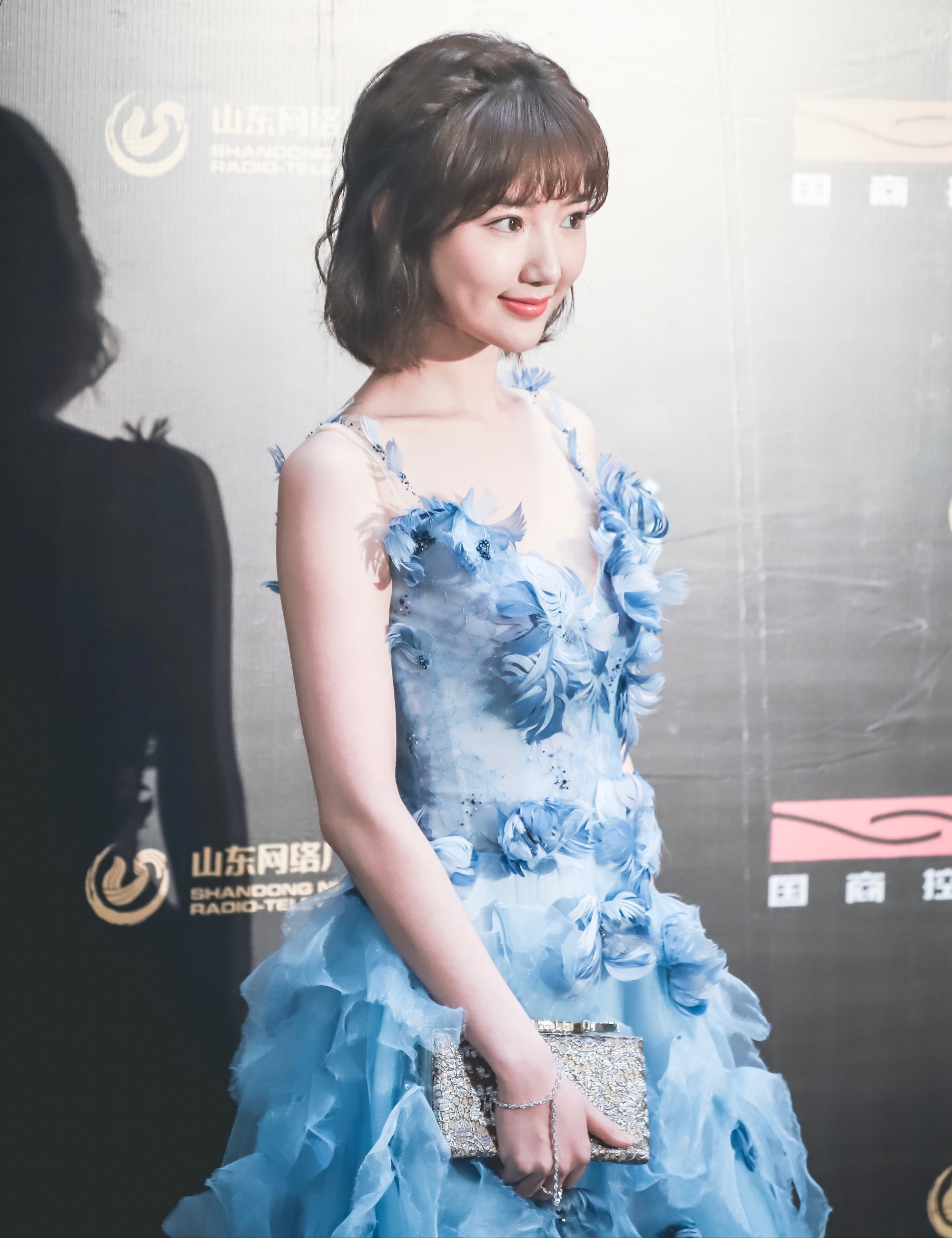
- Mao in 2018
- Born: 16 February 1988 (age 38); Tianjin, China
- Other name: Rachel Momo
- Education: Central Academy of Drama
- Occupation: Actress
- Years active: 2010–present

Chinese name
- Traditional Chinese: 毛曉彤
- Simplified Chinese: 毛晓彤
Transcriptions
Standard Mandarin
- Hanyu Pinyin: Máo Xiǎotóng

Mao Xiaotong (Chinese: 毛晓彤, born 16 February 1988), also known as Rachel Momo, is a Chinese actress. She is best known for her supporting roles in Empresses in the Palace (2012), Love O2O (2016), and The Princess Weiyoung (2016).

== Early life and education ==
Mao was born on 16 February 1988, in Tianjin, China. She was raised in a single-parent household. She shared that due to among other problems with her alcoholic father, he openly showed disdain towards her as a child due to her not being a boy. Which led her parents to divorce when she was two years old.

Mao took keyboard and vocal lessons since youth, and has gone on to learn competitive ballroom dancing such as Latin dance and dancesport. She studied performing arts at Central Academy of Drama.

== Career ==
Mao Xiaotong started to get recognition after appearing as a supporting role in Empresses in the Palace (2013), a critically acclaimed historical drama starring Sun Li. In 2012, she starred in wuxia drama The Magic Blade and was nominated at the LeTV Awards for Best New Actress for her performance.

Mao subsequently gained more recognition for her role as Zhong Ling in The Demi-Gods and Semi-Devils (2013). Thereafter Mao also starred in Sword Family Women (2014), The Romance of the Condor Heroes (2014), and Love Yunge from the Desert (2015).

In 2016, Mao gained more popularity for playing notable supporting roles in popular dramas Love O2O and The Princess Weiyoung.

In 2017, Mao played her first leading role in Hunan TV's romantic comedy drama Delicious Destiny.

In 2019, Mao starred in the science fiction romance drama My Robot Boyfriend, and modern workplace drama Who's not Rebellious Youth.

In 2020, Mao starred in the tomb-raiding web series Reunion: The Sound of the Providence, adapted from the Daomu Biji series. The same year, she starred in the female-centric modern drama Nothing But Thirty.

== Filmography ==
=== Film ===
Year	English title	Chinese title	Role	Notes/Ref.
2014	Dive In Love: 2014	这一刻爱吧2014	Wang Yu Xin	
2015	Fighting Youth	我是奋青	Su Shi	Main Role
2019	Zui + Pai Dang	醉+拍档	Female police	Main Role
2021	Mohist Mechanism	墨家机关术		
2021	Lost and Found	以年为单位的恋爱	Lu Lu Shan	Main Role

=== Television series ===
Year	English title	Chinese title	Role	Notes	Ref.
2010	Detective	女神捕	Liu'er		
2011	Silly Youth	傻春	young Zhao Subu		
2011	Night Falls in Chang'an	叶落长安	Bai Mudan		
2012	Empresses in the Palace	甄嬛传	Noble Lady Ying		
2012	The Magic Blade	天涯明月刀	Nangong Ling		
2013	The Demi-Gods and Semi-Devils	天龙八部	Zhong Ling		
2014	The Home of Lady	淑女之家	Zeng Linggan		
2014	Sword Family Women	刀客家族的女人	Yang Wenjun		
2014	Love is Back	爱情回来了	Bao Niannian		
2014	New Snow Leopard	雪豹坚强岁月	Xiao Ya		
2014	The Romance of the Condor Heroes	神雕侠侣	Guo Fu		
2015	Love Yunge from the Desert	大汉情缘之云中歌	Empress Shang Guan		
2015	Miss Unlucky	乌鸦嘴妙女郎	Bei Lili		
2015	The Gold Matchmaker 2	金牌红娘2	Jin Linglong		
2016	Love O2O	微微一笑很倾城	Er Xi		
2016	The Princess Weiyoung	锦绣未央	Li Changru		
2017	Be With You	不得不爱	Yao Yao		
2017	Delicious Destiny	美味奇缘	Song Jiaming		
2019	My Robot Boyfriend	我的机器人男友	Jiang Mengyan		
2019	Who's not Rebellious Youth	谁的青春不叛逆	Tang Shi		
2020	Reunion: The Sound of the Providence	重启之极海听雷	Bai Haotian		
2020	Nothing But Thirty	三十而已	Zhong Xiaoqin		
2021	The Bond	乔家的儿女	Qiao Sanli		
2021	Ebola Fighters	大国担当之埃博拉前线	He Huan		
2023	The Ingenious One	云襄传	Shu Yanan		
2023	The Heart	问心	Fang Xiaoran		
2023	May All Your Wishes Come True	心想事成	Sun Xiang		
TBA	The Fated General	大漠驃騎—霍去病	Wu Cai		
TBA	The Legend of Sealed Book	平妖传之天书奇谭	Hu Yong'er		

== Discography ==
Year	English title	Chinese title	Album	Notes/Ref.
2020	"Adventure"	冒险	Reunion: The Sound of the Providence OST	

== Awards and nominations ==
Year	Award	Category	Nominated work	Result	Ref.
2016	8th China TV Drama Awards	Most Charismatic Actor on the Screen	The Princess Weiyoung	Won	
2017	4th The Actors of China Awards	Best Actress (Web Series)	Love O2O	Nominated	
2020	7th The Actors of China Awards	Best Actress (Emerald)	Nothing But Thirty	Nominated	
2020	7th The Actors of China Awards	Outstanding Actress (Top 24)	Nothing But Thirty	Won	
2020	5th Tencent Video TV And Movie Award	Breakthrough TV Actor of the Year	Nothing But Thirty	Won	
2020	12th China TV Drama Awards	Creativity Actress of the Year	Nothing But Thirty	Won	
2020	29th Huading Awards	Best Actress (Modern Drama)	Nothing But Thirty	Won	
2020	29th Huading Awards	Audience's Favorite TV Actress	Nothing But Thirty	Won	
2021	27th Shanghai Television Festival	Best Supporting Actress	Nothing But Thirty	Nominated	
2021	32nd Huading Awards	Best Actress (Contemporary Drama)	The Bond	Nominated	
