= Chen Bolin =

Taiwanese actor (born 1983)

- 陳柏霖
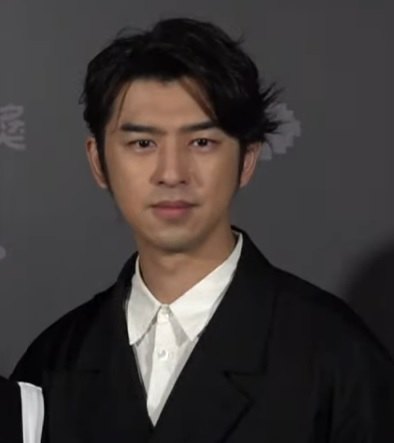
- Chen in June 2022
- Born: 27 August 1983 (age 43); Taipei, Taiwan
- Other name: Wilson Chen
- Education: Jinwen University of Science and Technology
- Occupation: Actor
- Years active: 1999–present
- Agent: BM+ Entertainment

Chinese name
- Traditional Chinese: 陳柏霖
- Simplified Chinese: 陈柏霖
- Hanyu Pinyin: Chén Bólín
- Jyutping: Can4 Paak3 Lam4
- Hokkien POJ: Tân Peh-lîm

Chen Bolin (Chinese: 陳柏霖; pinyin: Chén Bólín; Pe̍h-ōe-jī: Tân Peh-lîm; born 27 August 1983), also known as Wilson Chen, is a Taiwanese actor. He is known for the films Blue Gate Crossing (2002), Buddha Mountain (2010), The Continent (2014), and 20 Once Again (2015), as well as the television series In Time with You (2011).

== Early life and education ==
Chen was born on 27 August 1983. While in high school, Chen participated in the Taiwanese variety show Red Versus White due to his similarity to Takeshi Kaneshiro. He attended Jinwen University of Science and Technology.

== Career ==
Chen first gained attention with his debut film Blue Gate Crossing, which was screened at the Cannes Film Festival and received positive reviews. His supporting roles in Hong Kong films, such as The Twins Effect II, A Chinese Tall Story and Kung Fu Dunk pushed his stardom to regions beyond Taiwan.

Chen rose to prominence in 2011. He was nominated for the Best Actor award at the Deauville Asian Film Festival for his performance in the independent drama film Buddha Mountain. The same year, he won the Golden Bell Award for Best Actor with his memorable performance in the hit drama In Time with You. On January 6, 2012, Chen appeared in a Taiwanese game show, All Pass (based on FOX's game show Are You Smarter than a 5th Grader?) and became the only person to win the NT$100,000 (about US$3,300) grand prize; Chen faced the question during the taping, "Name the person who said the phrase: "There are three ups, on a pillow, a saddle, and the toilet.", to which he gave the correct answer Ouyang Xiu. When host Chang Hsiao-yen questioned Chen on how he got the answer, he recalled reading one of Xiu's books despite being unsure on what to give for the answer.

Chen won the "Outstanding Performance" award at the 2013 Chinese Film Media Awards for the romance film Snowfall in Taipei. The following year, he starred in the road trip comedy The Continent, directed by Han Han.

In 2015, Chen signed with BM+ Entertainment, for his foray into the Korean entertainment industry. The same year, he starred in 20 Once Again, the Chinese remake of the hit Korean film Miss Granny. The film grossed 32,350,000 USD and set the box office record for Korean-Chinese co-produced films.

Chen then starred in two Chinese-Korean co-productions - black comedy film Bad Guys Always Die opposite Son Ye-jin, and romantic comedy film Life Risking Romance with Ha Ji-won.

In 2016, Chen paired up with Song Ji-hyo in the Chinese version of We Got Married, a virtual reality program which pairs celebrities together as a couple. The same year, he joined the cast of Korean drama Monster.

In 2017, Chen starred in The Dreaming Man, a romantic comedy film produced by Disney.

== Filmography ==
=== Film ===
| Year | English title | Chinese (T) title | Role | Notes |
|---|---|---|---|---|
| 2002 | Blue Gate Crossing | 藍色大門 | Zhang Shihao | |
| 2004 | Love of May | 五月之戀 | Ah Lei | |
| 2004 | 20 30 40 | | rock musician | Cameo |
| 2004 | The Twins Effect II | 千機變II花都大戰 | Blockhead | |
| 2004 | Last Love First Love | 最後的愛，最初的愛 | Ah De | |
| 2005 | A Chinese Tall Story | 情癲大聖 | Sun Wukong | |
| 2005 | Bug Me Not! | 蟲不知 | Hyland | |
| 2005 | About Love | 戀愛地圖 | Yao | |
| 2005 | See Ghost 10 | 見鬼10 | Tak Zai | |
| 2006 | Sugar & spice: Fûmi zekka | 蜜糖與調味：風味絕佳 | Mike | |
| 2006 | Tripping | 神游情人 | Ah Ming / Hai Sheng | |
| 2006 | Silk | 詭絲 | Shou Ren | |
| 2006 | McDull, the Alumni | 春田花花同學會 | Xiao Bailing's boyfriend | |
| 2006 | Waiting in the Dark | 在黑暗中等待相遇 | Akihiro Oishi | |
| 2008 | Kung Fu Dunk | 大灌籃 | Ding Wei | |
| 2008 | PK.COM.CN | 誰說青春不能錯 | Ji Yinchuan | |
| 2008 | Give Love | 愛得起 | Yat-tong | |
| 2009 | Snowfall in Taipei | 台北飄雪 | Xiao Mo | |
| 2009 | My Airhostess Roommate | 戀愛前規則 | Liu Fei | |
| 2009 | Gasp | 氣喘吁籲 | Li Xinhong | |
| 2009 | L-O-V-E | 愛到底 | Waiter | Cameo |
| 2010 | Buddha Mountain | 觀音山 | Ding Bo | |
| 2010 | Kung Fu Hip-Hop 2 | 精舞門2 | Le Tian | |
| 2011 | Lovesick | 戀愛恐慌症 | Lu Zhehan | |
| 2012 | Silent Code | BBS鄉民的正義 | Yan Zhengyu | |
| 2012 | CZ12 | 十二生肖 | Wu Qing | Cameo |
| 2013 | Machi Action | 邊身 | Tie Nan / Superhero Fly | |
| 2013 | Campus Confidential | 追愛大佈局 | Wu Quanshun | |
| 2014 | Lock Me Up, Tie Him Down | 完美假妻168 | | Cameo |
| 2014 | The Continent | 後會無期 | Jiang He | |
| 2014 | Dive in 2014 | 這一刻，愛吧! 2014 | | |
| 2015 | 20 Once Again | 重返20歲 | Tan Ziming | |
| 2015 | Bad Guys Always Die | 壞蛋必須死 | Qiang Zi | |
| 2015 | Go Lala Go 2 | 杜拉拉追婚記 | Chen Feng | |
| 2015 | Surprise | 萬萬沒想到 | Tang Sen | |
| 2016 | Distance | 再見，在也不見 | Chen Mingde / Chen Zhibin / Manager Chen | |
| 2016 | Life Risking Romance | 致命戀愛 | Jason Chen | |
| 2017 | The Dreaming Man | 假如王子睡着了 | Zheng Tianchou | |
| 2024 | Breaking and Re-entering | 張博駿 | Chang Po-chun | |
| 2024 | Dead Talents Society | 鬼才之道 | Makoto | |

=== Television series ===
| Year | English title | Chinese (T) title | Role | Notes |
|---|---|---|---|---|
| 1999 | Robbers and Angels | 強盜與天使 | | |
| 2002 | Speed Youth | 極速青春 | Bo Lin | |
| 2003 | Crystal Boys | 孽子 | Youth in Bar | Cameo |
| 2007 | Tokyo Tower | 東京塔 | Leo | |
| 2007 | Tatta ichido no Yuki: Sapporo 1972 | 一度の雪SAPPORO・1972 | Sun Taisheng / Sun Weizhong | |
| 2009 | Marriage of Women with Different Blood Groups | 4大血型女結婚秘訣之O型 | Zhang Aidi | |
| 2010 | Modern People | 摩登新人類 | Ling Jie | |
| 2011 | In Time with You | 我可能不會愛你 | Li Daren | |
| 2012 | All Pass | 百萬小學堂 | Contestant | Contestant, won NT$100,000 top prize. |
| 2016 | Monster | 몬스터 | Michael Chang | Guest appearance |
| 2018 | The King of Blaze | 火王 | Chung Tʻien | |
| 2019 | Crocodile and Plover Bird | 鱷魚與牙籤鳥 | Zhou Erwen | |
| 2020 | Jian Ai Nan Nu | 鑑愛男女 | | Cameo |
| 2022 | Small and Mighty | 正義的演算法 | Liu Lang | |
| 2024 | Breeze by the Sea | 不如海邊吹吹風 | Bai Yin-mo | |

=== Variety show ===
| Year | English title | Chinese (S) title | Role | Notes |
|---|---|---|---|---|
| 2016 | We Are in Love | 我们相爱吧 | Cast member | with Song Ji-hyo |
| 2017 | Divas Hit the Road | 花儿与少年 | Cast member | Season 3 |

== Discography ==
| Year | English title | Chinese (S) title | Album | Notes |
|---|---|---|---|---|
| 2010 | "If It Can Be Earlier" | 如果可以早一点 | Kung Fu Hip-Hop 2 OST | |
| 2011 | "I Will Not Like You" | 我不会喜欢你 | In Time with You OST | |

== Awards and nominations ==
| Year | Award | Category | Nominated work | Result |
|---|---|---|---|---|
| 2012 | 47th Golden Bell Awards | Best Actor | In Time with You | Won |
| 2013 | 15th Chinese Film Media Awards | Outstanding Performance | Snowfall in Taipei | Won |
| 2015 | 10th Seoul International Drama Awards | Asia Star Grand Award | —N/a | Won |
