= Lu Ho-jo =

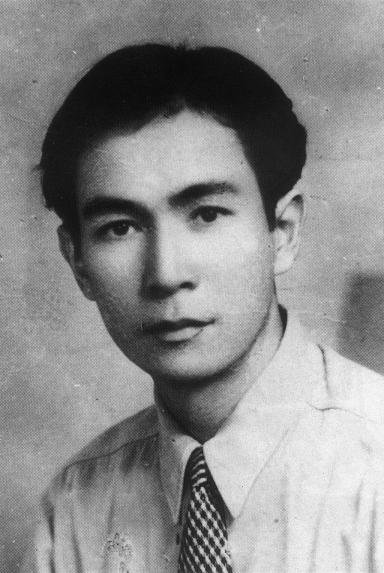
Portrait of Lu Ho-jo.

Lu Ho-jo (Chinese: 呂赫若; August 25, 1914 – September 3, 1950), real name Lu Shih-tui (呂石堆), and known by the pen name Lu Ho-jo (呂赫若), was a Taiwanese writer, vocalist, and playwright, earning the title "First Literary Genius of Taiwan". According to his relatives, the pen name Ho-jo is derived from Japanese and means "an eminent young man". There is another account suggesting that he combined the names of two left-wing writers he admired, the Korean writer Jang Hyukjoo (張赫宙) and the Chinese writer Kuo Mo-jo (郭沫若), selecting one character from each ("Hyuk" and "Jo") to form his pen name.

== Biography ==
Lu Ho-jo was born in Tantzu District, Taichung City, Taiwan. In 1935, he published his first novel, Oxcart, in the Japanese literary magazine Literary Review (Bungaku Hyoron). This marked his debut in the literary world and garnered significant attention in the Taiwanese literary scene, earning him the title of "literary genius". His novels primarily depict the lives of the lower strata of society.

In 1939, Lu Ho-jo enrolled in the Department of Vocal Performance at Musashino Academia Musicae and took part in the Toho Theatrical Troupe for over a year. In 1942, he returned to Taiwan and became an editor for Taiwan Literature, a publication overseen by Chang Wen-huan. He continued to contribute to literary works and later assumed the role of a journalist for Hsingnan News.

In the wake of the 228 Incident in Taiwan, he shifted towards socialism and joined the Chinese Communist Party, contributing to the publication Kuangming News. In August 1949, several individuals associated with Kuangming News were gradually arrested and sentenced. In turn, Lu Ho-jo went on the run, shortly thereafter seeking refuge in bases like Luku in Shiding Township, Taipei County, an incident later known as the Luku Base Incident. After 1950, Lu Ho-jo mysteriously disappeared. Historical records suggest that he died from a snakebite on the Luku Mountain.
