= Grace Chen =

Chinese fashion designer

- Occupations: dressmaker; fashion designer
- Website: www.gracechen.com

Grace Chen is a Chinese fashion designer. She is best known for designing dresses for Chinese business and political elite, and in America for celebrities including Oprah Winfrey and Helen Mirren.

Chen is the first mainland Chinese graduate from Fashion Institute of Technology in New York City.

== Early life and education ==
Chen was born in Beijing, China. Chen attended Fashion Institute of Technology.

== Career ==
After graduating Fashion Institute of Technology, Chen worked for Halston in New York and Tadashi Shoji in Los Angeles. She established her couture brand in Shanghai in 2009.

At the 2021 Beijing Fashion Week Chen received the Fashion Brand Award. In 2022, Chen launched her Grace of China show in Beijing.

In November 2024, Chen presented Children of the Sun bringing together influential women from Mexico and around the world.
