= Antipodean Film Festival =

Film festival of Australasian films held in St Tropez, France

The Antipodean Film Festival (French: Rencontres internationales du cinéma des Antipodes), variously referred to as Festival des Antipodes, Antipodes International Film Festival, Antipodes Film Festival Saint Tropez, Saint Tropez Film Festival and other variations, is a film festival showcasing New Zealand and Australian films, held annually in St Tropez in France since 1999.

Most of the events take place at the Renaissance Cinema on Place des Lices in Saint Tropez. The event, which runs for three days, includes a Junior Antipodes section and a feature film competition.

The 2021 edition was given the label "Australia Now France 2021-2022", making it part of a celebration of many aspects of Australia in France which includes projects and collaborations throughout the country.

== Awards ==
Many prizes have been awarded since the second edition of the event in 2000. There were no awards given in 2001 or 2020. Former jury members include Bryan Brown, Stéphane Audran, Anthony La Paglia, Tina Arena, Phillip Noyce, Jean-Loup Dabadie, Bruce Beresford, Julie Ferrier, Greta Scacchi, Fred Schepisi, Miranda Otto, Nadia Tass, and many others.

=== Grand Prix Best Feature Film ===
The Jury Grand Prix, Best Feature film (Le Grand Prix du Jury, Meilleur Long Métrage) was awarded in 2000, 2006–2019, and from 2021. The following films won the award:

- 2000: Innocence by Paul Cox – AUS; & Ça ira mieux demain by Jeanne Labrune - FR
  - Mention: The Price of Milk by Harry Sinclair – NZ
- 2006: 10 Canoes by Rolf De Heer – AUS
- 2007: Lucky Miles by Michael James Rowland – AUS
  - Mention: Noise by Matthew Saville - AUS
- 2008: The Bet by Mark Lee – AUS
- 2009: Samson and Delilah by Warwick Thornton – AUS
- 2010: Beautiful Kate by Rachel Ward – AUS
- 2011: Lou by Belinda Chayko – AUS
- 2012: The King Is Dead! by Rolf De Heer – AUS
- 2013: How to Meet Girls from a Distance by Dean Hewison – NZ
  - Mention: Mystery Road by Ivan Sen – AUS
- 2014: Canopy by Aaron Wilson - AUS
- 2015: The Dark Horse by James Napier Robertson - NZ
- 2016: Pawno by Paul Ireland - AUS
- 2017: Jasper Jones by Rachel Perkins - AUS
  - Mention: The Pā Boys by Himiona Grace - NZ
- 2018:West of Sunshine by Jason Raftopoulos - AUS
- 2019: Waru by Ainsley Gardiner, Casey Kaa, Renae Maihi, Awanui Simich-Pene, Briar Grace-Smith, Paula Whetu Jones, Chelsea Winstanley, Katie Wolfe - NZ
  - Mention: Brothers' Nest by Clayton Jacobson
- 2020: No jury
- 2021: Bellbird by Hamish Bennett - NZ
- 2022: The Drover's Wife by Leah Purcell - AUS
- 2023: Limbo by Ivan Sen - AUS & Millie Lies Low by Michelle Savill - NZ

=== Best Actor ===
Best Actor (Meilleur Acteur) was created in 2001.

=== Best Actress ===
Best Actress (Meilleur Actrice) was created in 2001.

=== Audience Award ===
The Audience Award for Best Feature Film (Prix du Public, du Meilleur Long Métrage) has been awarded since 2000. The winners of this prize include:

- 2000 : The Monkey's Mask by Samantha Lang - AUS
- 2001 : No award
- 2002 : Beneath Clouds by Ivan Sen - AUS
- 2003 : Horseplay by Stavros Kazantzidis - AUS
- 2004 : Fracture by Larry Parr - NZ
- 2005 : Oyster Farmer by Anna Reeves & The Climb by Bob Swaim – AUS / NZ
- 2006 : Number 2 by Toa Frazer - NZ
- 2007 : Clubland by Cherie Nowland - AUS
- 2008 : Black Balloon by Elissa Down - AUS
- 2009 : The Strength of Water by Armağan Ballantyne - NZ
- 2010 : The Waiting City by Claire McCarthy - AUS
- 2011 : Face to Face by Michael Rymer – AUS
- 2012 : Red Dog by Kriv Stenders – AUS
- 2013 : Last Dance by David Pulbrook – AUS
- 2014 : Healing by Craig Monahan – AUS
- 2015 : Paper Planes by Robert Connolly - AUS
- 2016 : Last Cab to Darwin by Jeremy Sims - AUS
- 2017 : Jasper Jones by Rachel Perkins - AUS
  - Mention : The Pā Boys by Himiona Grace - NZ
- 2018 : Three Wise Cousins by Stallone Vaiaoga-Ioasa - NZ
- 2019 : Ladies in Black by Bruce Beresford - AUS
- 2020 : No award
- 2021 : High Ground by Stephen M. Johnson - AUS
- 2022 : How to Please a Woman by Renée Webster - AUS
- 2023 : Sweet As by Jub Clerc - AUS

=== Nicholas Baudin Award, Best Short Film ===
Best Short Film (Prix du Meilleur Court Métrage) was awarded in 2000. There was no award for a short film in 2001. The Nicholas Baudin Award/ Nicholas Baudin Prize, (Prix Nicolas Baudin, Meilleur Court Métrage) has been awarded each year since 2002, named in honour of French explorer Nicholas Baudin. As of 2024 it is supported by the Woodside Valley Foundation.

=== 20th Anniversary Award ===
The 20th Anniversary Award for Best Antipodes' Short Film (Prix du 20ème anniversaire pour le meilleur court métrage des Antipodes) was awarded to The Virgin, made by Jack Yabsley.

=== Audience Award, Short Film ===
The Audience Award, Australian Short Film Today (Prix du Public, Australian Short Film Today) has been awarded since 2020, but there was no award in 2023.
