= Aaron Wilson (director) =

Australian filmmaker

- Born: 16 February 1976 (age 50); Tocumwal, New South Wales, Australia
- Education: Monash University (Bachelor of Electrical Engineering)
- Occupations: Film director, screenwriter
- Years active: 2004–present

Aaron Wilson (born 16 February 1976) is an Australian film director and screenwriter, known for the 2013 suspense war drama Canopy and the 2021 period drama Little Tornadoes.

== Early life ==
Wilson was born in rural Australia and grew up on a farm along the Murray River. The world of his childhood serves as inspiration for much of his work.

== Career ==
=== Films ===
Wilson has made several short films, which have screened at numerous festivals, with some gaining international sales and garnering awards. These include Ten Feet Tall (based on the song Ten Ft Tall by Australian singer-songwriter Pete Murray), Feng (Wind), Leap Year, My Name is Martin, and Ahmad’s Garden, which premiered at the 2008 Melbourne International Film Festival (MIFF).

Wilson developed the script for his first feature film Canopy, while he was undertaking a filmmaker residency program with Objectifs Centre for Filmmaking and Photography in Singapore. The film deals with war and its impact on people, and has very little dialogue.

Canopy was filmed in Singapore in 2010 and premiered in competition at the 2013 Toronto International Film Festival, and went on to screen at dozens of film festivals including Busan International Film Festival, International Film Festival Rotterdam, New Horizons Film Festival, Shanghai International Film Festival, Seattle International Film Festival and Taipei Film Festival. It was awarded the Grand Prix Award for Best Film at the 2014 Antipodean Film Festival, Best Director at the 2014 International Film Festival War on Screen (WoS), and Special Jury Mention at the 2013 Abu Dhabi Film Festival.

His second feature film, Little Tornadoes, was co-written by Australian author Christos Tsiolkas, who was brought onto the project in 2020. It was shot on a tiny budget across a number of years commencing in 2009 (back to back with Canopy), and final pickup filming taking place in early 2021. Wilson has described it as second film in his regional PTSD trilogy. The film, set in 1971 rural Australia, deals with the impact of post-traumatic stress disorder on a family. It had its world premiere at the 2021 Melbourne International Film Festival (online only due to Melbourne's COVID-19 pandemic lockdown), and went on to screen at Brisbane International Film Festival, CinefestOZ, and the Antipodean Film Festival in St Tropez.

The film was released in Australian cinemas on 12 May 2022. It received an honourable mention as one of ACMI's Best Films of 2021, and was selected as one of The Guardian’s “Top 10 Australian Films of 2022”.

Wilson said that he explores themes of masculinity, vulnerability and isolation (physical and emotional) in both Canopy and Little Tornadoes. His paternal grandmother, who lived on the family farm during his childhood, became a strong influence in Wilson's life and his storytelling.

Wilson's 2021 short VR film, Iopu is about a queer Samoan-Australian performer, and was co-directed by Iopu Auva'a. The film was developed with the assistance of "Cinemart" (hosted by International Film Festival Rotterdam) and premiered at MIFF in 2021, and Wilson won the 2021 ADG Award for Best Direction in an Interactive or Immersive Title for the film.

As of May 2024, Wilson is again working with Tsiolkas on a film set in rural Australia that is "perhaps a little more action-packed".

=== Commercials ===
In addition to his films, Wilson has directed numerous TV commercials, commissioned films and multi-platform projects across Australia and South-East Asia.

In 2012, he directed the Impossible Orchestra project, which saw an orchestra perform continuously for 24 hours at Melbourne's Hamer Hall to raise awareness of the round-the-clock role of Australia's 2.6 million unpaid carers in our community. The multi-camera event was live-streamed, and comprised short documentary films (directed by Wilson in the lead-up to the event) featuring Melbourne carers. The project, conceived by McCann Worldgroup (Melbourne), received numerous awards including a Bronze Lion at the 2013 Cannes Lions.

He also directed the 2018 "Passion Kitchens" project for Singapore Tourism Board, which celebrates four different and distinct Singaporean cuisines through an immersive VR experience.

== Filmography ==
Short film

- Rendezvous (2004)
- Ten Feet Tall (2005)
- Hotel Vladivostok (2005)
- Feng (Wind) (2007)
- Leap Year (2008)
- Ahmad’s Garden (2009)
- The Living Memorial (2010)
- My Name is Martin (2012)
- Impossible Orchestra (TV documentary) (2014)
- Passion Kitchens (VR) (2018)
- Alone Together (installation & films) (2021)
- Iopu (VR) (2021)

Feature film

- Canopy (2013)
- Little Tornadoes (2021)

Music video

- Let Me Grow My Wings (2021)
