= The King of Blaze (TV series) =

- Genre: Fantasy; Romance; Historical; Science fiction
- Based on: The King of Blaze; You Su-lan
- Written by: Rao Jun
- Directed by: Hu Yijuan
- Starring: Chen Bolin; Jing Tian; Zhang Yijie; Lai Yumeng
- Country of origin: China
- Original language: Mandarin
- No. of seasons: 2
- No. of episodes: 28 (part 1); 33 (part 2)

Production
- Executive producer: Peng Dan
- Producer: Feng Xiaogang
- Production companies: Mango TV; Beijing Jetsen Technology Development; Zhejiang Dongyang Mayla Media; Beijing Xinliliang Entertainment; EE-Media; Shanghai Artrendwave Productions

Original release
- Network: Hunan TV
- Release: November 26, 2018

The King of Blaze (Chinese: 火王; pinyin: Huǒwáng; lit. 'Fire King') is a 2018 Chinese television series based on the Taiwanese manhua of the same name. It stars Chen Bolin and Jing Tian with Zhang Yijie and Lai Yumeng.

The series is separated into two different parts; the first part (火王之破晓之战) is set in the ancient era and Tang dynasty while the second part (火王之千里同风) is set in the modern era. It aired on Hunan TV on November 26, 2018.

== Synopsis ==
=== Part one ===
Thousands of years ago, there was a beautiful planet amongst the stars protected by six different deities of different elements. During a battle with dark forces, the deities suffer a huge blow and Qian Mei sacrificed herself to save her lover, Zhong Tian. In order to save their homeland, Zhong Tian travels to the glorious age of the Tang dynasty where he meets an astronomer named Feng Jian who looks exactly like his long-lost love. Feng Jian is revealed to be Qian Mei, and the couple eventually reunites. However, they face even bigger danger as the dark forces follow them to the mortal realm. It was discovered that the mastermind behind the dark forces is Di Yun, Zhong Tian's former close friend. Zhong Tian must contend against the countervailing forces of kinship, friendship and love to save his planet.

=== Part two ===
Lin Ye is Zhong Tian after 1,300 years. He gathered a group of young entrepreneurs and established an eco green group to research more about environmental protection and new energy sources. He meets Tong Feng, a female reporter, through an interview; and they work together to promote environmental conservation. However, Lin Ye's old friend Di Yun appears and uses underhanded means to interfere and steal his fruit of labors. Lin Ye and Tong Feng must work together to recover their efforts.

== Cast (Part 1) ==
=== Main ===
Actor	Character	Introduction
Chen Bolin	Zhong Tian	King of Blaze, God of Fire . Shang Xuan sent him to earth to find new source of energy to restore the Immortal Realm from the brink of collapse/destruction after the war against the wing clan. He arrived in Western Regions which he travel from to China, Tang dynasty. Along the journey he meet friends and foes with familiar faces to him.
Jing Tian	Qian Mei / Situ Feng Jian	Goddess of Wind. She is reincarnated in the Tang dynasty after she died in the war against the Wing clan as Feng Jian, an imperial astronomer. Soulmate of Zhong Tian
Zhang Yijie	Hao Yue	God of Thunder. He is reincarnated in the Tang dynasty after he died in the war against the Wing clan as a bandit who later became a Tang imperial general and princess Li Ying's bodyguard, who he fell in love later on.
Lai Yumeng	Hua Cheng / Li Ying	Goddess of Water. She is reincarnated in the Tang dynasty after she died in the war against the Wing Clan as Princess Li Ying, a fictional character portrayed as the daughter of Emperor Gaozong of Tang and Empress Wu Ze-tian. She had a brief crush on Zhong Tian and later on she fell in love with Hao Yue

=== Supporting ===
==== Tang dynasty ====
Actor	Character	Introduction
Zhang Weina	Xing Qiu	Feng Jian's attendant.
Fan Shiqi	Li Hong	Crown prince of the Tang dynasty. He in love with Situ Feng Jian which is one sided love
Liu Hailan	Princess Zhaoping	Daughter of Emperor Gaozong of Tang and a Concubine. Sent to Western Region for political arrange marriage.
Wang Dancang	Pei Luoqing	An imperial astronomer who deeply loves the crown prince, and views Feng Jian as a rival.
Zhang Hanjun	General Zha Ke	
Wang Maolei	Li Chunfeng	Feng Jian's adoptive/god-father. A legendary astronomer .
Peng Ling	Zhu Yuanzhi	Magistrate at Court of Judicial.
Su Hang	Li Jinzhong	A general who protects the Crown Prince.
Nan Sheng	Qian Qian	A young girl from the Caravan, who is skilled in medicine. Later revealed to be a spy working for Wuyi Sect that secretly controls by the wing clan that has been trying to invade earth
Sui Keming	Qi Le	Son of Shopkeeper Qi. He loves Qian Qian and protects her.
Tong Fan	Shopkeeper Qi	merchant Leader of a traveling nomad . Ally of Zhong Tian
Yi Chendi	Pei Zhong	
Liu Min	Empress Wu Zetian	Mother of Li Ying & Li Hong.
Cai Gang	Emperor Gaozong of Tang	Ruler of China. Father of Li Ying, Li Hong & Li Zhaoping
Hong Tuya	Hu You	
Li Zhenqi	Pei Judao	
Tan Zao	Xin'er	
Li Ruoning	Xian Min	
Zhang Han	Kyrgyz	
Liu Chuang	Baleimeng	
Zhu Xiaojun	Wang Jingzhi	
Wang Zikuan	Guo Yu	
Lu Jun		
Lv Haiting	Xiao Lv	
Wang Chengyun	Xiao Liu	
Zhang Miao'er	Hu Zuo	
Tan Tianming	Gao Chen	
Su Chen	Xiao Mengzi	
Xuan Ke	Cun Zheng	
Fu Caizhi	Minister Song	
Ren Xuehai	Eunuch Du	

==== Deities ====
Actor	Character	Introduction
Du Junze	You He / Chief of Wuyi Sect	God of Lakes. He is Zhong Tian's love rival. He has a one side love for Qian Mei. He is reincarnated in the Tang dynasty after he died in the war against the Wing clan as Chief of Wuyi Sect who is memory is erased and control by Tian Heng to go against Zhong Tian and help the wing clan invade earth..
Sun Shaolong	Di Yun	God of Mountains. Adoptive son of Shang Xuan who he has an obsession with. Biological son of Tian Heng. He joined force with wing clan to go against Zhong Tian to find a way to save Shang Xuan even in the cost of earth and innocent lives.
Huang Youming	Shang Xuan	Leader of the seven Gods. He sent Zhong Tian to earth to find new source of energy to restore the Immortal Realm from the brink of collapse/destruction after the war against the wing clan. At same time he froze the Immortal Realm and put himself into a deep sleep while waiting for Zhong Tian to return with a new source of energy to save the Immortal Realm. Beside he sent the souls/spirit of decreased god to be reincarnated at earth to aide Zhong Tian in his journey.
Du Yuming	Tian Heng	Leader of wing clan. Biological father of Di Yun; Archenemy of the gods who was seal away by them long time ago until the seal broken after it grew weak as time past.

== Cast (Part 2) ==
=== Part two ===
Actor	Character	Introduction
Chen Bolin	Lin Ye	A young CEO and scientist who is ambitious and talented. He is focused on finding the journey back to the heavenly sanctuary.
Jing Tian	Tong Feng	An experienced and passionate news reporter.
Zhang Yijie	Lei Hao	An aspiring environmentalist and scientist . Good friend of Lin Ye. Boyfriend of Wei Yongqian.
Lai Yumeng	Wei Yongqian	A famous celebrity with a quirky personality. Girlfriend of Lei Hao.
Zhang Weina	Xiao Yu	Editor of a fashion magazine.
Sui Keming	Qi Le	
Du Junze	Li Juewen	
Sun Shaolong	Di Yun	
Liu Hailan	Ou Lin	
Zhang Hanjun	Li Yunlong	A policeman.
Fan Yixuan	Jiang Haoming	
Bo An	Pei Mingshun	

== Production ==
Part 1 of the series was filmed from June to August 2017 in Iceland, Xiangshan and Yinchuan.

Part 2 of the series was filmed from August to November in Hangzhou and Iceland.

== Broadcast ==
=== Ratings ===
Hunan TV Premiere ratings
Air date	Episode	CSM52 city network ratings			CSM National Network-ratings		
Air date	Episode	Ratings (%)	Audience share (%)	Rank	Ratings (%)	Audience share (%)	Rank
November 26, 2018	1-2	0.330	2.943	2	0.17	2.12	2
November 27, 2018	3-4	0.418	3.582	2	0.26	2.98	2
November 28, 2018	5-6	0.419	3.502	2	0.23	2.49	1
November 29, 2018	7-8	0.645	5.822	2	0.31	3.80	1
December 3, 2018	9-10	0.624	5.424	1	0.24	2.88	1
December 4, 2018	11-12	0.631	5.282	2	0.28	3.22	1
December 5, 2018	13-14	0.629	5.299	1	0.29	3.26	1
December 6, 2018	15-16	0.639	5.636	2	0.34	4.14	1
December 10, 2018	17-18	0.532	4.795	2	0.29	3.34	1
December 11, 2018	19-20	0.803	6.536	1	0.34	3.78	1
December 12, 2018	21-22	0.676	6.395	1	0.25	3.14	1
December 13, 2018	23-24	0.750	6.317	1	0.32	3.51	1
December 17, 2018	25-26	0.613	5.506	2	0.33	3.58	1
December 18, 2018	27-28	0.688	4.556	2	0.32	2.67	1

=== Premiere ===
Channel	Country	Broadcast Date	Broadcast Time
dimsum	Malaysia	26 November 2018	Until Ep 28

== Soundtrack ==
=== Part 1 ===
No.	Title	Lyrics	Music	Singers	Length
1.	"Sear (烙印)" (Theme song)	Yuan Liyuan	Dan Yulong	Li Qi	4:42
2.	"Heartstrings (心弦)" (Ending theme song)	Yi Jie	Tan Xuan	Juno Su	4:09
3.	"Water Immortal (水仙)"	Huang Bo	Liu Chang	He Jie & Allen Su	4:40
