= The Seven Mirrors' Stories =

- The seven gods, from left to right: Ti Yün, Hua Chêng, Hao Yüeh, Shang Hsüan, Chung Tien, Chien Mei, You Hê.

古鏡奇譚 Ku-ching Chʻi-tʻan; Gǔ jìng qí tán
- Genre: Action; Adventure; Contemporary fantasy Historical fantasy Romance; Supernatural
- Author: You Su-lan
- Illustrator: You Su-lan
- Publisher: (Taiwan) Da Ran Culture (1991); Kung-Long Int. (2001); Rye Field Publishing (2012)
- Other publishers: (Singapore) Chuang Yi (Thailand) Burapat Comics (Hong Kong) Fun-Lok Publishing (Vietnam) Tre Publishing House (South Korea) Bluebird Book Publishing, Seoul Media Land
- Magazine: (Taiwan) Weekend Comics & Princess Comic Magazine; China Cartoon
- Original run: 1989
- Collected volumes: 17 (first edition); 19 (new edition)

The Seven Mirrors' Stories (Chinese: 古鏡奇譚; pinyin: Gǔ jìng qí tán; Wade–Giles: Ku^{3}-ching^{4} Chi^{2}-tan^{2}; Zhuyin Fuhao: ㄍㄨˇ ㄐㄧㄥˋ ㄑㄧˊ ㄊㄢˊ; lit. 'Legendary Tales of the Ancient Mirrors') is the title of a collection of two Taiwanese comic book series and one comic strip, written and illustrated by the comic artist You Su-lan. The story centers on the fate of seven ancient gods who are reincarnated in the human world at different epochs, each one of them has a mirror to represent their own powers, therefore "The Seven Mirrors".

== Installments ==
=== Melancholic Princess ===
Melancholic Princess (Chinese: 傾國怨伶) is the 1st installment of The Seven Mirrors' Stories, serialized in the Taiwanese magazine Weekend Comics since 1989 and published by Da Ran Culture in traditional Chinese tankōbon format in 1991. The story mainly focuses on the Goddess of Water Hua Chêng's two reincarnations Li Ying (in Tang dynasty) and Wei Yung-chien (in present day), and her relationship with God of Creation Shang Hsüan and God of Thunder Hao Yüeh.

=== The King of Blaze ===
The King of Blaze (Chinese: 火王) is the 2nd installment of The Seven Mirrors' Stories, serialized in the Taiwanese magazine Princess Comic Magazine since 1991 and published by Da Ran Culture in traditional Chinese tankōbon format from 1992 to 1998. The story mainly focuses on the God of Fire (King of Blaze) Chung Tien and Ssŭ-tu Fêng-chien (God of Wind Chien Mei's reincarnation in the Tʻang dynasty), their love, fate and final destination.

=== The Story of Tan Yü ===
The Story of Tan Yü (Chinese: 丹聿記) is the 3rd installment of The Seven Mirrors' Stories, currently serialized to episode 12 (February 2016) in the Chinese magazine China Cartoon since 2015. The protagonist Tan Yü is the reincarnation of God of Lakes You Hê in an unknown epoch during the Imperial China.

== The Seven Gods ==
King Wên of Chou's Manifested "Later Heaven" bagua arrangement. The elements and their corresponding gods: 火 Fire (Chung Tien), 風 Wind (Chien Mei), 雷 Thunder (Hao Yüeh), 山 Mountain (Ti Yün), 水 Water (Hua Chêng), 澤 Lake (You Hê), 天 Heaven and 地 Earth (Shang Hsüan).

The Seven Gods were originally created by the author based on the natural elements represented within the bagua, a cosmological symbol in Taoism.

Ti Yün (帝昀)

God of Mountains, the only one that has healing ability apart from Shang Hsüan among the seven gods, and the most loyal one to Shang Hsüan.

Hua Chʻêng (嫿琤)

Goddess of Water, the love of Shang Hsüan. The only female among the seven gods. First time reincarnated as princess Li Ying in the Tʻang dynasty, a fictional character portrayed as the daughter of Emperor Kao-tsung and Empress Wu Tsê-tʻien, who has a romantic relationship with Hao Yüeh. Reincarnated in contemporary era as a 16-year-old Taiwanese-American girl called Wei Yung-chʻien, falls in love with Shang Hsüan. She is the protagonist of Melancholic Princess, the 1st installment of this series.

Hao Yüeh (昊玥)

God of Thunder, reincarnated in the Tʻang dynasty as an imperial general and bodyguard of Princess Li Ying, the two fall in love with each other. He is one of the main characters of Melancholic Princess, the 1st installment of this series.

Shang Hsüan (尙軒)

God of Creation and Universe, the leader of the seven gods. He has a romantic relationship with Hua Chêng, the Goddess of Water. He is one of the main characters of Melancholic Princess, the 1st installment of this series.

Chung Tʻien (仲天)

God of Fire, the King of Blaze with red hair, despite this, he had been known as a cold-hearted one among all the seven gods since the remote antiquity. His first reincarnation in the Tʻang dynasty is a red-haired and blue-eyed Caucasian blacksmith from the Western Regions, he meets his soulmate Ssŭ-tʻu Fêng-chien in this life. Teles Connelly Downey is the present-day reincarnation, an American CEO based in New York City. He is the protagonist of The King of Blaze, the 2nd installment of this series.

Chʻien Mei (千湄)

God of Wind, a beautiful child with blond hair, he is blind, but can see the threads of fate. He is reincarnated as Ssŭ-tʻu Fêng-chien in the second life, a famous fortune teller in the Tʻang dynasty, being cross-dressed as a young lady for keeping a secret that he no longer grows up since the age of 13. His present-day third life is an American teenage psychic named Shannon Arden. He is the twin flame of Chung Tien and one of the protagonists of The King of Blaze, the 2nd installment of this series.

You Hê (優河)

God of Lakes, Chung Tien's love rival. He frequently approaches Chien Mei with a playful attitude, occasionally flirtatious, but deep down, he is seriously in love with him. During a fierce confrontation with Chung Tien in their second life (Tang dynasty), the two are engaged in a fight over Chien Mei's reincarnation Ssŭ-tu Fêng-chien, resulting in You Hê's death. He appears in the short sidequel The Lost Moments, being reincarnated in the present-day Taiwan as Wên Hsi-hua. He is also the protagonist of The Story of Tan Yü, the 3rd installment of this series.
