= 2017 Sundance Film Festival =

Film festival in Utah, US

- Festival poster
- Location: Park City, Salt Lake City, and Sundance Resort in Utah
- Hosted by: Sundance Institute
- Festival date: January 19 to January 29, 2017
- Language: English
- Website: sundance.org/festival
- 2018 Sundance Film Festival 2016 Sundance Film Festival

The 2017 Sundance Film Festival took place from January 19 to January 29, 2017. The first lineup of competition films was announced November 30, 2016.

== Awards ==
The following awards were presented:

- Grand Jury Prize: Dramatic – I Don't Feel at Home in This World Anymore by Macon Blair
- Audience Award: Dramatic – Crown Heights by Matt Ruskin
- Directing Award: Dramatic – Eliza Hittman for Beach Rats
- Waldo Salt Screenwriting Award – David Branson Smith and Matt Spicer for Ingrid Goes West
- U.S. Dramatic Special Jury Award for Breakthrough Performance – Chanté Adams for Roxanne Roxanne
- U.S. Dramatic Special Jury Award for Breakthrough Director – Maggie Betts for Novitiate
- U.S. Dramatic Special Jury Award for Cinematography – Daniel Landin for The Yellow Birds
- Grand Jury Prize: Documentary – Dina by Dan Sickles and Antonio Santini
- Directing Award: Documentary – Peter Nicks for The Force
- U.S. Documentary Orwell Award - Icarus by Bryan Fogel
- U.S. Documentary Special Jury Award for Editing – Kim Roberts and Emiliano Battista for Unrest
- U.S. Documentary Special Jury Award for Storytelling – Yance Ford for Strong Island
- U.S. Documentary Special Jury Award for Inspirational Filmmaking – Amanda Lipitz for Step
- World Cinema Grand Jury Prize: Dramatic – The Nile Hilton Incident by Tarik Saleh
- World Cinema Directing Award: Dramatic – Francis Lee for God's Own Country
- World Cinema Dramatic Special Jury Award for Screenwriting – Kirsten Tan for Pop Aye
- World Cinema Dramatic Special Jury Award for Cinematic Visions – Geng Jun for Free and Easy
- World Cinema Dramatic Special Jury Award for Cinematography – Manuel Dacosse for Axolotl Overkill
- World Cinema Jury Prize: Documentary – Last Men in Aleppo by Feras Fayyad
- World Cinema Directing Award: Documentary – Pascale Lamche for Winnie
- World Cinema Documentary Special Jury Award for Masterful Storytelling – Catherine Bainbridge and Alfonso Maiorana for Rumble: The Indians Who Rocked the World
- World Cinema Documentary Special Jury Award for Best Cinematography – Rodrigo Trejo Villanueva for Machines
- World Cinema Documentary Special Jury Award for Editing – Ramona S. Diaz for Motherland
- Audience Award: Documentary – Chasing Coral by Jeff Orlowski
- World Cinema Audience Award: Dramatic – I Dream in Another Language by Ernesto Contreras
- World Cinema Audience Award: Documentary – Joshua: Teenager vs. Superpower by Joe Piscatella
- Best of NEXT Audience Award – Gook by Justin Chon
- Alfred P. Sloan Prize – Marjorie Prime by Michael Almereyda

== Films ==
=== U.S. Dramatic Competition ===
- Band Aid by Zoe Lister-Jones
- Beach Rats by Eliza Hittman
- Brigsby Bear by Dave McCary
- Burning Sands by Gerard McMurray
- Crown Heights by Matt Ruskin
- Golden Exits by Alex Ross Perry
- The Hero by Brett Haley
- I Don't Feel at Home in This World Anymore by Macon Blair
- Ingrid Goes West by Matt Spicer
- Landline by Gillian Robespierre
- Novitiate by Maggie Betts
- Patti Cake$ by Geremy Jasper
- Roxanne Roxanne by Michael Larnell
- To the Bone by Marti Noxon
- Walking Out by Alex & Andrew Smith
- The Yellow Birds by Alexandre Moors

=== U.S. Documentary Competition ===
- Casting JonBenet by Kitty Green
- Chasing Coral by Jeff Orlowski
- City of Ghosts by Matthew Heineman
- Dina by Dan Sickles & Antonio Santini
- Dolores by Peter Bratt
- The Force by Pete Nicks
- ICARUS by Bryan Fogel
- The New Radical by Adam Bhala Lough
- Nobody Speak: Trials of the Free Press (originally titled NOBODY SPEAK: Hulk Hogan, Gawker and Trials of a Free Press but the title was changed after publication of the Sundance catalogue and before the world premiere of the film) by Brian Knappenberger
- Quest by Jonathan Olshefski
- STEP by Amanda Lipitz
- Strong Island by Yance Ford
- Trophy by Shaul Schwarz & Christina Clusiau
- Unrest by Jennifer Brea
- Water & Power: A California Heist by Marina Zenovich
- Whose Streets? by Sabaah Folayan & Damon Davis

=== Premieres ===
- Beatriz at Dinner by Miguel Arteta
- Before I Fall by Ry Russo-Young
- The Big Sick by Michael Showalter
- Call Me by Your Name by Luca Guadagnino
- The Discovery by Charlie McDowell
- Fun Mom Dinner by Alethea Jones
- Get Out by Jordan Peele
- The Incredible Jessica James by Jim Strouse
- The Last Word by Mark Pellington
- Manifesto by Julian Rosefeldt
- Marjorie Prime by Michael Almereyda
- Mudbound by Dee Rees
- Newness by Drake Doremus
- The Polka King by Maya Forbes
- Rebel in the Rye by Danny Strong
- Rememory by Mark Palansky
- The Vanishing of Sidney Hall (originally titled "Sidney Hall"; changed before theatrical release) by Shawn Christensen
- Where Is Kyra? by Andrew Dosunmu
- Wilson by Craig Johnson
- Wind River by Taylor Sheridan

=== Next ===
- Columbus by Kogonada
- Dayveon by Amman Abbasi
- A Ghost Story by David Lowery
- Gook by Justin Chon
- Lemon by Janicza Bravo
- Menashe by Joshua Z Weinstein
- Person to Person by Dustin Guy Defa
- Thoroughbreds by Cory Finley

=== Spotlight ===
- Colossal by Nacho Vigalondo
- Frantz by François Ozon
- Lady Macbeth by William Oldroyd
- Raw by Julia Ducournau

=== Midnight ===
- 78/52 by Alexandre O. Philippe
- Bad Day for the Cut by Chris Baugh
- Bitch by Marianna Palka
- Bushwick by Cary Murnion & Jonathan Milott
- Killing Ground by Damien Power
- Kuso by Steve
- The Little Hours by Jeff Baena
- XX by Annie Clark, Karyn Kusama, Roxanne Benjamin & Jordana Vuckovic

=== World Cinema Dramatic Competition ===
- Axolotl Overkill by Helene Hegemann
- Berlin Syndrome by Cate Shortland
- Carpinteros by José María Cabral
- Don't Swallow My Heart, Alligator Girl! by Felipe Bragança
- Family Life by Alicia Scherson & Cristián Jiménez
- Free and Easy by Geng Jun
- My Happy Family by Nana Ekvtimishvili & Simon Gross
- God's Own Country by Francis Lee
- The Nile Hilton Incident by Tarik Saleh
- Pop Aye by Kirsten Tan
- I Dream in Another Language by Ernesto Contreras
- The Wound by John Trengove

=== World Cinema Documentary Competition ===
- The Good Postman by Tonislav Hristov
- In Loco Parentis by Neasa Ní Chianáin & David Rane
- It's Not Yet Dark by Frankie Fenton
- Joshua: Teenager vs. Superpower by Joe Piscatella
- Last Men in Aleppo by Feras Fayyad
- Machines by Rahul Jain
- Motherland by Ramona Diaz
- Plastic China by Jiu-liang Wang
- RUMBLE: The Indians Who Rocked the World by Catherine Bainbridge
- Tokyo Idols by Kyoko Miyake
- WINNIE by Pascale Lamche
- The Workers Cup by Adam Sobel

=== New Frontier ===
- 18 Black Girls / Boys Ages 1-18 Who Have Arrived at the Singularity and Are Thus Spiritual Machines: $X in an Edition of $97 Quadrillion by Terence Nance
- Did You Wonder Who Fired the Gun? by Travis Wilkerson
- World Without End (No Reported Incidents) by Jem Cohen
- NeuroSpeculative AfroFeminism by Carmen Aguilar y Wedge, Ashley Baccus-Clark, Ece Tankal and Nitzan Bartov

=== Other ===
- Shots Fired

== Juries ==
Jury members, for each program of the festival, including the Alfred P. Sloan Jury were announced on January 11, 2017.

U.S. Documentary Jury

- Diego Buñuel
- Julie Goldman
- Robert Greene
- Susan Lacy
- Larry Wilmore

U.S. Dramatic Jury

- Gael García Bernal
- Peter Dinklage
- Jody Hill
- Jacqueline Lyanga
- Jeannine Oppewall

World Documentary Jury

- Carl Spence
- Marina Stavenhagen
- Lynette Wallworth

World Dramatic Jury

- Nai An
- Sonia Braga
- Athina Rachel Tsangari

Alfred P. Sloan Jury

- Heather Berlin
- Tracy Drain
- Nell Greenfieldboyce
- Nicole Perlman
- Jennifer Phang

Short Film Jury

- Shirley Kurata
- David Lowery
- Patton Oswalt
