= Piers Pigou =

Piers Pigou is a British conflict analyst, human rights practitioner and consultant who has lived and worked in South Africa since 1992. Born in the United Kingdom and raised in Zambia, he has spent more than three decades working across Africa on issues of political violence, transitional justice, peacebuilding and governance, with a particular focus on Southern Africa's fragile and conflict-affected states. He is based in Johannesburg.

== Early life and education ==
Pigou was born in the United Kingdom to Elinor Pigou and Michael Alan Pigou, and grew up in the Republic of Zambia with his older brother Justin. He studied at Portsmouth Polytechnic — now the University of Portsmouth — between 1985 and 1989, graduating with a BA (Honours) in Politics, and went on to complete an MA in Southern African Studies at the University of York in 1991.

== Career ==
=== South Africa: early years (1992–2005) ===
Pigou moved to South Africa in July 1992 as a volunteer with Quaker Peace & Service, working at the Black Sash advice office in Johannesburg. The following year he joined Peace Action, a violence-monitoring NGO, as a caseworker, and subsequently moved to the Independent Board of Inquiry (IBI), where he researched and monitored political violence on the Reef during the transition period leading up to South Africa's first democratic elections.

In May 1994, Pigou led a significant investigation into torture allegations against the South African Police in the Vaal Triangle and Johannesburg. He later ran a human rights legal aid project in the Vaal funded by the Royal Dutch Embassy.

In April 1996, Pigou joined the Johannesburg office of the South African Truth and Reconciliation Commission (TRC) as an investigator, working across a range of gross human rights violation cases with a particular focus on the covert operations of the apartheid state and its security forces. He served as the lead TRC investigator into the Boipatong massacre and related violence in the Vaal Triangle, and subsequently wrote critically on the TRC's handling of those investigations. After leaving the TRC's full-time staff in May 1997, he was brought back on contract as the lead investigator in the Winnie Mandela hearings, which examined Winnie Madikizela-Mandela's role in the activities of the Mandela United Football Club and associated human rights violations. His academic analysis of the TRC's treatment of state violence was published in the journal Politikon in 2001, and has since been cited in peer-reviewed scholarship on the period.

In 1998, Pigou joined the Community Agency for Social Enquiry (CASE), an applied research NGO in Johannesburg, where his work included human rights knowledge assessments for the European Union Foundation for Human Rights, refugee rights research for the UNHCR, and public participation studies in South Africa's provincial legislatures. From 2000 he also worked part-time for the Centre for the Study of Violence and Reconciliation (CSVR), coordinating the Violence and Transition Project, before joining the organisation full-time in November 2001.

Between 2003 and 2004 his work took him to East Timor, where he served as an international adviser to the Truth Seeking Division of the Commission for Reception, Truth and Reconciliation (CAVR) and completed a detailed assessment of the Commission's Community Reconciliation Process. The resulting publication, Crying Without Tears: In Pursuit of Justice and Reconciliation in Timor-Leste (2003), examined community expectations of the transitional justice process and has been widely cited in the field. During the same period he reviewed Human Rights Defender initiatives across Southern Africa for the Netherlands Institute of Southern Africa and assessed transitional justice options in Zimbabwe. In 2005 he was instrumental in establishing the Zimbabwe Torture Victims Project, which provided medical, psychosocial and legal support to primary victims of organised violence and torture.

=== South African History Archive (2006–2009) ===
Pigou took up the directorship of the South African History Archive (SAHA) in January 2006, leading an institution committed to documenting past and contemporary struggles for justice in South Africa and promoting public access to records through litigation and outreach. His work at SAHA included access-to-information litigation under the Promotion of Access to Information Act and efforts to improve public access to TRC records. He served on SAHA's board of trustees both before and after his directorship.

=== International Centre for Transitional Justice (2009–2010) ===
From June 2009 to October 2010, Pigou was Senior Associate for Southern Africa at the International Center for Transitional Justice (ICTJ), with Zimbabwe as his primary focus. Working in the aftermath of the 2008 post-election violence, he designed and implemented transitional justice programmes aimed at accountability and reconciliation.

=== International Crisis Group (2011–2023) ===
Pigou spent more than a decade at the International Crisis Group (ICG), first as Project Director for Southern Africa and later as Senior Consultant. His field research and policy reporting covered Zimbabwe, Mozambique and eSwatini, and his advocacy work in Washington, D.C., Brussels and London contributed to shifts in international policy on sanctions regimes and peace negotiations in the region. He wrote regularly for the Mail & Guardian on Zimbabwe and Southern African politics, and was quoted by international outlets including the Washington Post, Bloomberg, Al Jazeera and the Daily News on Zimbabwean affairs. He co-authored a Daily Maverick opinion piece with advocate Howard Varney in 2020 in support of South African human rights campaigner Yasmin Sooka, who had been targeted by the Sri Lankan government over her work with the International Truth and Justice Project — an organisation for which Pigou also undertook investigative work.

From 2020, Pigou contributed weekly and monthly incident analysis on the insurgency in northern Mozambique for the Armed Conflict Location and Event Data Project (ACLED), producing detailed reports on the conflict in Cabo Delgado province. He also advised The Elders, the independent global leaders' group founded by Nelson Mandela.

=== Institute for Security Studies (2023–2025) ===
Between 2023 and 2025, Pigou served as Southern Africa Programme Head at the Institute for Security Studies (ISS) in Pretoria, directing a multimillion-dollar regional security programme across ten countries and leading a twelve-member multidisciplinary team. He established the ISS's Climate Security Programme and engaged extensively with the African Union, SADC and member-state governments on peace and security architecture. He wrote and commented publicly on the democratic deficit in eSwatini and the failure of SADC mediation to produce meaningful political reform, and provided expert commentary following Al Jazeera's gold smuggling investigation implicating senior Zimbabwean officials. During the post-election unrest in Mozambique following the October 2024 elections, he was widely quoted in international media on the SADC response and its regional implications. He also remained a go-to source on unresolved questions around the Boipatong massacre, consulted by journalists investigating the case as recently as 2025.

=== Independent consultancy ===
Throughout his career, Pigou has advised a range of international organisations and NGOs, including the African Development Bank, and bodies working on access to justice, criminal justice reform and torture rehabilitation across Kenya, Zimbabwe, Liberia, Northern Ireland, Canada, Lebanon and Cyprus. Since 2018 he has taken on private sector consultancies including work for Control Risks, Focus Group and Sibanye-Stillwater, among others.

== Film and media appearances ==
Pigou appeared as a contributor in the documentary Winnie (2017), directed by Pascale Lamche. The film examines the life and political legacy of Winnie Madikizela-Mandela and had its world premiere at the Sundance Film Festival in January 2017, where Lamche won the World Cinema Documentary Directing Award. It went on to screen at Hot Docs, the Encounters Documentary Festival, the Sydney Film Festival, Sheffield Doc/Fest and the Durban International Film Festival, among others, featuring testimony from figures including George Bizos, Denis Goldberg, Ahmed Kathrada and Dumisa Ntsebeza.

He also appears in The Trials of Winnie Mandela (Netflix, 2026), a seven-part documentary series directed by the late two-time Emmy Award-winning filmmaker Mandy Jacobson and produced under the African Oral History Archive, an initiative of the Ichikowitz Family Foundation. The series premiered on 23 April 2026 and was developed in collaboration with Winnie Madikizela-Mandela's granddaughters, HRH Princess Zaziwe Manaway and HRH Princess Swati Mandela-Dlamini. Pigou's involvement draws directly on his role as lead TRC investigator in the Winnie Mandela case, to which he was appointed after leaving the Commission's full-time investigative staff in May 1997.

== Selected publications ==
Pigou has authored and co-authored numerous policy reports, academic articles, and media commentaries. Selected works include:

- Pigou, P. (2003). Crying Without Tears: In Pursuit of Justice and Reconciliation in Timor-Leste: Community Perspectives and Expectations. New York: International Centre for Transitional Justice.
- Pigou, P. (2004). The Community Reconciliation Process of the CAVR. Dili: UNDP Timor-Leste.
- Pigou, P. (2001). "The Apartheid State and Violence: What Has the Truth and Reconciliation Commission Found?" Politikon, 28(2), pp. 207–233.
- Pigou, P. (2015). Book review: Liberation movements in power: Party and state in southern Africa. Journal of Southern African Studies.
- Pigou, P. (2011). "Special Feature: IJTJ Interviews." International Journal of Transitional Justice.

He has also authored numerous reports for the International Crisis Group on Zimbabwe, Mozambique and eSwatini (2011–2023), ISS programme reports on Southern African peace and security architecture (2023–2025), ACLED monthly and weekly incident analysis on the northern Mozambique insurgency (2020–present), and opinion pieces for the Mail & Guardian, Daily Maverick and African Arguments.

== Board memberships ==
Pigou has served on the boards of the South African History Archive (SAHA), the GALA Queer Archive in Johannesburg, and the Southern African Centre for Survivors of Torture.

== Personal life ==
Pigou holds British citizenship and South African permanent residency. In 2022 he married Tlotlisang Pigou (née Mokoena). They have one son together. He also has a son and a daughter from a previous relationship with Venitia Govender, a South African social justice and human rights activist.

Through his marriage, Pigou is brother-in-law to actor and former Member of Parliament Fana Mokoena, a founding member of the Economic Freedom Fighters known internationally for his roles in Hotel Rwanda (2004) and World War Z (2013). His mother-in-law, Mekodi Arcillia Mokoena, is a veteran of the anti-apartheid struggle who was detained and held in solitary confinement for inciting a student protest in Kroonstad in solidarity with the 1976 Soweto Uprising.

Pigou is a great-nephew of the Cambridge economist Arthur Cecil Pigou (1877–1959), who held the chair of Political Economy at the University of Cambridge from 1908 to 1943 and is widely regarded as the founder of modern welfare economics. A.C. Pigou's best-known work, The Economics of Welfare (1920), introduced the concept of externalities and the corrective use of taxation, known as Pigovian taxation, which remains central to environmental economics. The Pigou Club, a grouping of economists advocating a carbon tax to address climate change, was named in his honour.
