= Zhang Zhiyong =

Chinese actor (born 1978)

- 张志勇
- Born: Zhang Zhiyong; 1978 (age 47–48); Hegang, Heilongjiang, China
- Education: Qufu Normal University
- Occupation: Actor
- Years active: 2002–present

Zhang Zhiyong (Chinese: 张志勇; born 1978) is a Chinese actor known for his frequent collaborations with director Geng Jun. He won Best Leading Actor in the 61st Golden Horse Awards for his role in Geng's Bel Ami (2024).

== Early life and education ==
Zhang was born in 1978 in Hegang, Heilongjiang, China. He grew up in a mining district and was childhood friends with his neighbor and future film director Geng Jun. At the age of 10, Zhang discovered a detonator while playing with Geng and their friends in the mines, and he attempted to open it with a knife out of curiosity, which resulted in an accidental explosion that injured his eyes and fingers, leaving permanent damage. Geng noted that these injuries made Zhang reluctant to face the camera while acting in films, and he only regained his confidence after receiving encouragement from Geng. Zhang later attended Qufu Normal University.

== Career ==
Zhang began acting at the age of 22 and became a recurring cast member in Geng Jun's films since Geng started his career in 2002. He acted as an amateur while holding a full-time job. In 2013, he starred as Brother Yong in Geng's short film The Hammer and Sickle Are Sleeping, which won Best Live Action Short Film in the 51st Golden Horse Awards. Geng utilized Zhang's disabilities by designing his character as an armed robber who uses a walking stick as a weapon. He then appeared as Lao Gao, the village chief, in Tong Wang's 2015 film Time to Die. In 2016, Zhang played Zhang Zhiyong, a crooked soap salesman, in Geng Jun's feature film Free and Easy. Boyd van Hoeij of The Hollywood Reporter remarked on his status as a "non-professional actor like everyone else". Zhang also starred in Xing Jian's 2019 historical drama Winter After Winter, and appeared as Ma Qianli, a indebted property developer, in Geng Jun's 2022 feature Manchurian Tiger.

In 2024, Zhang took on the male lead role in the drama film Bel Ami also directed by Geng Jun, where he portrayed a homosexual middle-aged man (also named Zhang Zhiyong) with a stable career and family who seeks to come out and pursue sexual freedom. Zhang won Best Leading Actor in the 61st Golden Horse Awards for this role, becoming the first Chinese actor to win a Golden Horse Award since China boycotted the ceremony in 2019. The Golden Horse Film Festival Executive Committee commented that Zhang's performance and decision to use his real name in the film allowed him to embody the character's honesty and sincerity, describing it as "bringing the character to life with authenticity and sincerity". He also made a cameo appearance in the 2024 Taiwanese historical drama film The Embers.

== Filmography ==
| Year | Title | Role | Notes |
|---|---|---|---|
| 2013 | The Hammer and Sickle Are Sleeping | Brother Yong (勇哥) | |
| 2015 | Time to Die | Lao Gao (老高) | |
| 2016 | Free and Easy | Zhang Zhiyong (张志勇) | |
| 2019 | Winter After Winter | Bing Ga (冰尜) | |
| 2022 | Manchurian Tiger | Ma Qianli (马千里) | |
| 2024 | Bel Ami | Zhang Zhiyong (张志勇) | |
| 2024 | The Embers | Interrogator | Cameo |

== Awards and nominations ==
| Year | Award | Category | Work | Result | Ref. |
|---|---|---|---|---|---|
| 2024 | 61st Golden Horse Awards | Best Leading Actor | Bel Ami | Won | |
