= Daughter's Daughter =

2024 Taiwanese film by Huang Xi

- Theatrical poster
- Traditional Chinese: 女兒的女兒
- Hanyu Pinyin: Nǚ'Ér De Nǚ'Ér
- Directed by: Huang Xi
- Screenplay by: Huang Xi
- Produced by: Hou Hsiao-hsien; Sylvia Chang
- Starring: Sylvia Chang; Karena Lam; Eugenie Liu
- Cinematography: Yao Hung-i
- Edited by: Liao Ching-sung
- Music by: Kay Huang; Point Hsu; Angu Liang; Mukio Chang
- Production company: Sun Lok Productions
- Distributed by: Andrews Film
- Release dates: 12 September 2024 (TIFF); 22 November 2024 (Taiwan)
- Running time: 126 minutes
- Country: Taiwan
- Language: Mandarin

Daughter's Daughter (Chinese: 女兒的女兒; pinyin: Nǚ'ér de nǚ'ér) is a 2024 Taiwanese family drama film directed and written by Huang Xi, marking her second feature after Missing Johnny (2017), and co-produced by Hou Hsiao-hsien and Sylvia Chang. Chang also stars in a lead role, alongside Karena Lam and Eugenie Liu, with the film following a recently retired mother (Chang) who loses her daughter (Liu) in an accident and has to make decisions about a frozen embryo her daughter left behind.

Pre-production for the film began in 2018, with Sylvia Chang attached to the project from the outset. The screenplay was developed over five years and greenlit in November 2023 after winning the Golden Harvest Award. Principal photography took place from December 2023 to January 2024 in Taipei and New York City, and the film was showcased in the Golden Horse Goes to Cannes section of the 77th Cannes Film Festival in May 2024.

The film had its world premiere in competition for the Platform Prize at the 49th Toronto International Film Festival on 12 September 2024, where Sylvia Chang received an honorable mention, and was theatrically released in Taiwan on 22 November. It received five nominations in the 61st Golden Horse Awards, with Huang Xi winning for Best Original Screenplay.

== Plot ==
Ai breaks her leg and is hospitalized. During her stay, her mother Shen, who has recently returned to Taipei from New York, visits her, accompanied by her estranged daughter Emma, whom she sent away to an acquaintance in Chinatown at a young age. Zuer, Ai's lesbian daughter born after she left America and returned to Taiwan with her now-divorced husband, arrives next with her girlfriend Jiayi, meeting her long-lost sister Emma for the first time.

Five years later, Zuer travels to New York with Jiayi for intrauterine insemination. Despite experiencing strong arguments with Ai, who opposes her decision to have a child, deeming her too immature to care for one, Zuer misses her mother and calls her in tears before her ovulation induction. She and Jiayi then meet up with Emma and Emma's paternal father Johnny for dinner. However, the partners become involved in a car accident on their way to New Jersey afterwards, resulting in Jiayi's death at the scene and Zuer sustaining severe injuries. Ai immediately flies to America after receiving news from Johnny, but Zuer has already succumbed to her injuries by the time Ai arrives. Heartbroken, Ai refuses to accept the news and asks Johnny to leave her alone. Eventually, she loses her way on the streets and seeks out Emma in Chinatown. They find Zuer's Airbnb, but Ai stops Emma from tidying up Zuer's belongings, claiming she is too heartbroken to do so.

The following day, Ai goes to the fertility clinic with Emma, where they learn that Zuer and Jiayi have left behind a healthy frozen embryo, of which Ai is now the legal guardian. Overwhelmed and unfamiliar with the technology, Ai initially chooses to terminate it. When they return to Zuer's Airbnb, they discover a wall covered in graffiti with various messages left behind by residents. Emma searches for what Zuer has written, but Ai insists that Zuer would not conform to the majority and write there. This familiarity with Zuer leads Emma to express that it breaks her heart. Wanting to keep Zuer's baby, Emma begins looking for suitable surrogate mothers. Upon learning this, Ai confronts Emma, arguing that she is too old for another child, especially since she still has to care for her own mother. Emma reveals her disappointment in Ai as a mother for considering giving up her daughter's child, just as Ai had abandoned her.

After the confrontation and attending Zuer's funeral, Ai changes her mind and agrees to have the child through a surrogate mother. Before leaving America, Ai has dinner with Emma again, facilitated by Johnny. While they are outside for a cigarette, Emma asks Ai what she is thinking when she abandoned her years ago. Ai replies that she is frightened and her only desire at that time is not to see Emma again, expressing gratitude that Emma is still willing to see her despite everything. Emma thanks Ai for her honesty, and they part ways after a hug. Before leaving Zuer's Airbnb, Ai remembers the graffiti and searches for Zuer's message, discovering it on the window: "Why do I not have my mother's name?" Seeing this, Ai leaves with a smile.

Two years later, Ai begins raising Zuer's daughter in Taipei, while a severely demented Shen repeatedly mistakes the present for the past, telling Ai that she is too immature for a child and advising her to abandon the daughter to a friend in Chinatown.

== Cast ==
- Sylvia Chang as Jin "Ai" Aixia, a recently retired mother of two daughters
- Karena Lam as Emma, Ai's daughter in New York whom she gave birth to and abandoned as a teenager
- Eugenie Liu as Fan Zuer, Ai's rebellious daughter whom she gave birth to in Taiwan years after Emma
- Winston Chao as Johnny, Ai's ex-boyfriend and Emma's biological father
- Alannah Ong as Shen Yan-hua, Ai's elderly mother
- Tracy Chou as Zhou Jiayi, Zuer's girlfriend
- Ma Tin-ni as Wang Lifen, Ai's best friend

== Production ==
=== Development ===
After producing the romance film Missing Johnny (2017), Huang Xi began developing her second feature film project, with pre-production starting in 2018 and Hou Hsiao-hsien attached as a producer during the early stages. Sylvia Chang, who had previously collaborated with Huang and Hou on the miniseries Twisted Strings (2022), joined the project five years prior to the start of filming. Chang was approached by Hou and immediately agreed to take on the role of lead actress and co-producer after reading the script. The screenplay took five years to develop, a duration Chang attributed to the COVID-19 pandemic, during which she was also involved in fine-tuning the script. During rewrites, Huang initially considered changing the film's setting to be entirely in Taiwan to reduce production costs, but Chang insisted on retaining the overseas scenes and filming in the United States. Huang also sought advice from filmmakers Wang Shaudi and Arthur Chu on the story. In August 2023, Alannah Ong announced that she would be joining the cast. The project eventually won the Excellent Screenplay Award at the 45th Golden Harvest Awards in November 2023, which led to the project being greenlit on the National Development Fund of Taiwan Creative Content Agency. On 5 December, Karena Lam announced that she would be collaborating with Sylvia Chang on a Taiwanese film, which was scheduled to begin shooting at Christmas. Huang was announced as the director in the same month, with Liao Ching-sung, Yao Hung-i, and Hwarng Wern-ying joining as editor, cinematographer, and production designer, respectively.

=== Filming ===
Principal photography of the film commenced on 14 December 2023, in Taipei, Taiwan, with Sylvia Chang and Karena Lam announced in lead roles, although Lam did not participate in the shoot in Taiwan. Filming then moved to New York City, United States, in early 2024, with location shooting took place at the New York City Subway. The shoot was scheduled to wrapped prior to lunar new year, and ultimately concluded within January.

=== Post-production ===
On 16 May 2024, the film was presented at the Golden Horse Goes to Cannes section of the 77th Cannes Film Festival, a new program collaborated by the Golden Horse Awards and Marché du Film with the support of Taiwan's Ministry of Culture. It was in post-production stage at the time of its showcase. Taiwan's Andrews Film secured the international distribution rights against Hong Kong's Edko Films prior to the film's world premiere.

== Release ==
Daughter's Daughter had its world premiere in the Platform Prize program at the 49th Toronto International Film Festival on 12 September 2024, where Sylvia Chang received a special award and was given an honorable mention from the jury for her performance, marking the first time an individual has been awarded this distinction since the Platform Prize was introduced in 2015. In the awards announcement statement, the jury described the film as "emotionally nuanced and masterfully assembled", and Chang's performance as "exceptional artistry" and an "extremely multilayered portrayal of a conflicted mother".

The film was also screened in competition at the 37th Tokyo International Film Festival, marking its Asian premiere, and closed the 21st Hong Kong Asian Film Festival and the 2024 Golden Horse Film Festival. It premiered in Taipei on 20 November 2024, and was released theatrically in Taiwan on 22 November.

The film is selected at the 24th New York Asian Film Festival to be held from July 11 to July 27, 2025, for its North American Premiere.

== Reception ==
Josh Slater-Williams of IndieWire gave the film a B+ and described Daughter's Daughter as "[tapping] into universal issues of regret, acceptance and hope with considerable nuance, grace and beautiful little details" through "Huang [Xi]’s patient storytelling, the rich subtleties of her stars’ performances, and the thorny nature of her central dilemma". Wendy Ide of Screen International called the film "elegant and affecting", praising Sylvia Chang's "terrific" performance which combines "steeliness and vulnerability", particularly "in a powerful scene towards the end of the film, in which Jin finally comes to terms with her guilt and perceived failures as a mother".

Alan Chu of United Daily News considers the film "a strong contender at the Golden Horse Awards", lauding the lead actresses, particularly Eugenie Liu's "subtle yet impactful" portrayal of a lesbian character and Karena Lam's "unexpectedly relaxed" performance, while also commending Chang's depiction of a grieving mother, calling it "Chang's best performance in the past decade". Alex Chung of HK01 echoed Chu's opinion, stating that all three lead actresses were "outstanding in their roles", and praised Huang Xi's script for being "careful and well-structured", employing "different narrative styles to depict the subtle dynamics among the three female characters", describing her Best Original Screenplay win as "well-deserved".

Matthew Joseph Jenner of the International Cinephile Society gave the film 4/5 stars and acknowledged the film as "complex and harrowing, but poetically beautiful", which is "driven by a genuine sense of emotional complexity that is heartfelt and meaningful without ever becoming heavy-handed" and provides "foundation for a truly compelling exploration of the human condition and its many intricate nuances". Drew Burnett Gregory of queer magazine Autostraddle, however, offered a rather negative review, criticizing the film for using "dead lesbian trope" without appropriate exploration, and finding "the craft is competent yet unremarkable" while "the writing is blunt and forced with minimal depth", concluding that while "[she understands] this isn't a movie made for queer audiences. [She] just [thinks] straight audiences also deserve better".

== Related work ==
While producing and starring as a mother in the film, Sylvia Chang collected various thoughts and reflections on parental relationships, which she plans to publish as a book. The book is currently scheduled for release, tentatively titled Daughter.

== Awards and nominations ==
Year	Award	Category	Nominee	Result	Ref.
2023	45th Golden Harvest Awards	Excellent Screenplay Award	—N/a	Won	
2024	61st Golden Horse Awards	Best Leading Actress	Sylvia Chang	Nominated	
2024	61st Golden Horse Awards	Best Supporting Actress	Eugenie Liu	Nominated	
2024	61st Golden Horse Awards	Best Original Screenplay	Huang Xi	Won	
2024	61st Golden Horse Awards	Best Original Film Song	Deserts Chang for "Listen"	Nominated	
2024	61st Golden Horse Awards	Best Makeup & Costume Design	Kao Hsien-ling	Nominated	
2025	18th Asian Film Awards	Best Actress	Sylvia Chang	Nominated	
