= Mongrel (2024 film) =

2024 Taiwanese-Singaporean-French film by Chiang Wei-liang and Yin You-qiao

- Theatrical release poster
- Traditional Chinese: 白衣蒼狗
- Hanyu Pinyin: Bái Yī Cāng Gǒu
- Directed by: Chiang Wei-liang; Yin You-qiao
- Written by: Chiang Wei-liang
- Produced by: Lai Wei-jie; Lynn Chen; Chu Yun-ting; Marie Dubas; Elizabeth Wijaya
- Starring: Wanlop Rungkumjad; Kuo Shu-wei; Daniel Hong; Lu Yi-ching; Atchara Suwan
- Cinematography: Michaël Capron
- Edited by: Dounia Sichov
- Production companies: Le Petit Jardin; E&W Films; Deuxième Ligne Films
- Release date: 20 May 2024 (Cannes)
- Running time: 128 minutes
- Countries: Taiwan; Singapore; France
- Languages: Mandarin; Thai

Mongrel (Chinese: 白衣蒼狗) is a 2024 drama film directed and written by Chiang Wei-liang, with co-direction by Yin You-qiao. Starring Wanlop Rungkumjad, Kuo Shu-wei, Daniel Hong, Lu Yi-ching, and Atchara Suwan, the film explores themes related to migrant caregivers in Taiwan, focusing on one caregiver (Rungkumjad) who develops a bond with his new patient (Kuo).

A co-production between Taiwan, Singapore, and France, Singaporean director Chiang Wei-liang envisioned creating a film centered on migrant caregivers and the South Asian diaspora in Taiwan in 2017. He began developing the screenplay in late 2018, concurrently with pre-production, and completed the first draft in early 2020 during the Cinéfondation Residence. Principal photography took place from late 2022 to early 2023, primarily in rural areas of eastern Taiwan.

The film had its world premiere at the 77th Cannes Film Festival on 20 May 2024, where it received a special mention for the Caméra d'Or. It received generally positive reviews from critics, particularly regarding the film's themes, characters, and tone, while Chiang's direction and visuals garnered both praise and criticism. It also secured seven nominations in the 61st Golden Horse Awards.

== Plot ==
Hsing, a local gangster who operates illegal migrant work as caregivers in rural Taiwan, fails to pay his workers for two months, stirring up dissatisfaction. Oom, a migrant caregiver and Hsing's right-hand man who oversees the other migrants, helps calm the crowd and promises them that payment will come soon. Just then, a caregiver in the crowd faints. Upon checking on her, Oom informs the crowd that she is merely sick. However, the migrants are more concerned about taking her shift. To prevent disputes, Oom offers to take her shift himself and splits the money with everyone.

The next day, Oom cares for Hui, a cerebral palsy patient, and his elderly mother Mei. Mei asks Oom to take Hui to a care facility and decides to leave him there, but Hui cries desperately and refuses to stay. Mei is forced to bring Hui back home, but she privately asks Oom if he could put Hui to death. That night, Hsing tells the crowd that he cannot pay them right away and allows some to resign and look for other jobs, offering six quotas. Oom tries to warn a familiar caregiver, but the caregiver ignores and takes a quota anyway. Hsing and Oom then drive them to a karaoke bar in town, revealing that they are actually selling them to a human trafficking organization led by a gang boss named Brother Te. While being paid by Te, Hsing is revealed to be deeply in debt and unable to repay it himself. Oom returns to the dormitories to find the sick caregiver dead. On Hsing's orders, he and Hsing dispose of her body in the woods, concealing it from the crowd.

A fellow Thai caregiver confronts Oom, asking about the sick caregiver and their expected salary, demanding he tell the truth since he promised they could trust him upon arriving in Taiwan. Oom only tells her not to worry. That night, the desperate caregivers decide to pack up and leave. Feeling guilty, Oom does not stop them. The next morning, Hsing arrives at the dormitory to find only Oom left. Hsing then decides to recruit new migrants from Te's trafficking operation, forcing Oom to participate in the abduction to replenish their caregiving staff.

While caring for a patient, Oom finds himself locked inside the house without the keys. The elderly patient suffers a medical emergency, and Oom calls for emergency services. However, the EMTs cannot enter the house and must inform the patient's daughter-in-law to unlock the gate. Hsing arrives at the scene, furious that Oom has alerted both the patient's family and the police, and he beats him up. Therefore, later when Oom is caring for Hui and Mei, he takes Mei directly to the hospital when she suffers a medical emergency. On the way home, Mei drives the car but nearly crashes.

Realizing Mei cannot continue caring for Hui, Oom tells Mei he has considered her suggestion and agrees to carry out the killing for her. Overhearing their conversation, Hui begins to cry loudly, prompting Mei to hug him. After putting Hui to sleep, Mei signals Oom to proceed with the job and Oom bursts into tears.

== Cast ==
- Wanlop Rungkumjad as Oom, a Taiwan-based illegal caregiver originated from Thailand
- Kuo Shu-wei as Hui, Oom's new patient
- Daniel Hong as Hsing, a gangster who oversees illegal caregivers
- Lu Yi-ching as Mei, Hui's elderly mother
- Atchara Suwan as Mhai, Oom's friend and fellow expat
- Akira Chen as Brother Te, Hsing's gangster boss

== Production ==
=== Development ===
In 2017, director-screenwriter Chiang Wei-liang envisioned creating a film centered on migrant caregivers in Taiwan, motivated by his uncle's experience of being bedridden due to a stroke caused by language barriers and a lack of cooperation between his family and their Myanmar domestic helper. Chiang, a Singaporean expat based in Taiwan, had previously shown interest in exploring the situation of the South Asian diaspora in Taiwan, producing the short film Nyi Ma Lay (2017) and the VR film Only the Mountain Remains (2018) on this topic, which he described as driven by "a sense of social responsibility" as a filmmaker due to his own similar background. The screenplay for Mongrel began development in late 2018, simultaneously with field research. The film's Chinese title is derived from Laozi's Tao Te Ching, (Note: The Chinese title "白衣蒼狗" was derived from the phrase "天地不仁，以萬物為芻狗" in Chapter Five of Tao Te Ching, which literally translates as "heaven and earth do not concern themselves with benevolence, they see every being as nothing more than straw dogs".) which Chiang found it resonating with the overall theme of the film. The plot was also inspired by Chiang's personal experiences while taking care of his mother in Singapore, as well as his societal observations and encounters with other migrant caregivers. Chiang set the story in rural Taiwan, where he observed that these communities often have inadequate healthcare and rely on illegal migrant caregivers, noting that while medical measures can be easily implemented in cities, rural areas frequently lack labor and are usually "medical deserts".

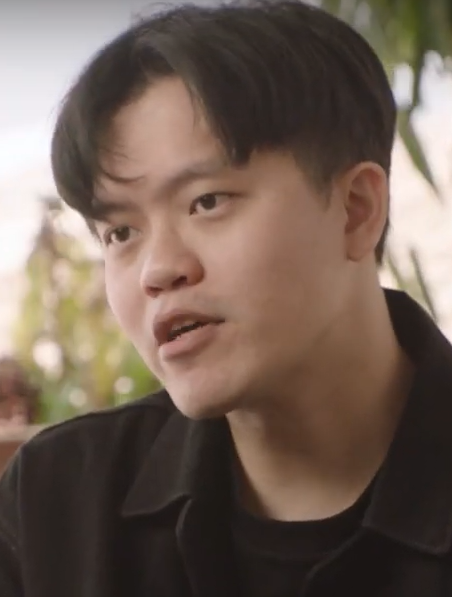
Director Chiang Wei-liang interviewed at Directors' Fortnight, Cannes Film Festival, about the film

Chiang completed the first draft during the Cinéfondation Residence from late 2019 to early 2020. In June 2020, the project was awarded funding by the Centre national du cinéma et de l'image animée, receiving a development grant of 5,000 euros. Chiang then participated in TorinoFilmLab and Talents Tokyo to refine the screenplay. The film's producers, Lai Wei-jie and Lynn Chen, were acquaintances of Chiang before the project, with Lai also offering advice on fine-tuning the script and Mongrel marked the first feature produced by Chen's production studio Le Petit Jardin. The film also received funding from the Ministry of Culture and the Taiwan Creative Content Agency, as well as from the Taipei Film Fund, Kaohsiung Film Fund, and grants from the Taichung City Government.

Hou Hsiao-hsien and Liao Ching-sung attached to the project as executive producers in early stages. It was set to be jointly produced by Taiwan, Singapore, and France, with Yin You-qiao credited as co-director. Location scouting and casting took place concurrently with the writing process, and Chiang attributed the lengthy pre-production to the COVID-19 pandemic. Thai actor Wanlop Rungkumjad and former triad member-turned-rapper Daniel Hong were offered lead roles after Chiang watched Rungkumjad's film Eternity (2010) and a short film starring Hong, deeming them suitable for their respective characters. Rungkumjad spent five months in Taiwan preparing for and shooting the film, which included learning Mandarin and communicating with illegal migrant workers.

=== Filming ===
Principal photography began in late winter 2022, primarily in rural Taiwan. Cinematographer Michaël Capron was invited by French co-producer Marie Dubas to lead the shoot while he was filming in Bogotá, and he immediately accepted the offer after reading the script, drawn to its writing and subject matter. The film was shot with Arri Alexa Mini in raw, using the rounded yet sober Zeiss GO series lens, as Capron aimed to avoid conventional digital aesthetic. To create a sense of imprisonment for the lead character Oom, the production crew used backgrounds with blank walls and small windows for interior shots; while for exterior shots, direct sunlight was also kept to a minimum, prompting the crew to choose sheer mountain ranges in eastern Taiwan for their mood-suitable weather, with scenes filmed at altitudes of 2,000 to 3,000 meters and Capron described the shooting process as "difficult". Real paramedics were hired to portray EMTs in the film, and during a shoot at Nantou County in 2023, a man in the village where they were filming suffered a cardiac arrest. Although the paramedics on set attempted to rescue him, they were ultimately unsuccessful, and the man's funeral was held at the end of the shoot. Location shooting also took place in Taichung City, including at the Ministry of Health and Welfare Taichung Hospital in February 2023, and filming wrapped in late March.

=== Post-production ===
Mongrel was presented at the project market of the International Film Festival Rotterdam in January 2024, with the film still in progress and only the first 15 minutes of footage screened. In April, the France-based Alpha Violet acquired for international sales. Post-production was initially reported to be completed by the second or third quarter of 2024, but ultimately concluded in May 2024.

== Release ==
Mongrel had its world premiere at the Directors' Fortnight during the 77th Cannes Film Festival on 20 May 2024, followed by a UK premiere at the 2024 Edinburgh International Film Festival. The film was also screened at the 2024 Melbourne International Film Festival, A Window on Asian Cinema section at the 29th Busan International Film Festival, in competition for the Grand Prize at the 25th Tokyo Filmex, and in competition for the NETPAC Award at the 2024 Golden Horse Film Festival.

== Reception ==
On review aggregator Rotten Tomatoes, 100% of 7 critics gave the film a positive review with an average rating of 7.8/10.

Peter Bradshaw of The Guardian gave Mongrel 4/5 stars and described it as a "sombre, sober movie made with impressive artistry", highlighting the "Zen state of suffering and sadness" that poignantly captures the despair and exploitation faced by illegal migrant workers, particularly through the lead character Oom. John Berra of Screen International also recognized director Chiang Wei-liang's thematic focus on illegal migrant workers, describing the film as a poignant yet powerful character study that effectively explores their challenges through an unflinching presentation marked by moral ambiguities, enhanced by Michaël Capron's careful use of cramped interiors and night-time exteriors, as well as Dounia Sichov's "docudrama feel" editing.

Stephanie Bunbury of Deadline Hollywood called the film "an absolutely brilliant piece of filmmaking", praising director Chiang Wei-liang's masterful control of pacing and visuals that evoke a sense of sci-fi dystopia, along with the rare decision to end the film with a "brief flash of optimism" amidst its harrowing subject matter. Namrata Joshi of Cinema Express described the film as "sombre, sobering, and ambiguous", noting its "rare grace amid utter despair" and highlighting challenging yet deeply humane exploration of migrant workers and emphasized the moral dilemmas reflected in the characters' struggles.

Josh Slater-Williams of IndieWire gave the film a B and offered a rather critical review, noting its similarities to Sofia Coppola's Lost in Translation (2003) and emphasizing that "the compositions, editing rhythms and pacing of Mongrel fully encourage absorbing and analyzing as much detail as possible from sometimes very little onscreen movement". David Katz of Cineuropa also observed the film's resemblance to Hou Hsiao-hsien (the film's executive producer) and Edward Yang's masterful use of craft and composition, but criticized Mongrel for its overreliance on "hermetic" storytelling and mise-en-scène, which led to an unsettling focus on the characters' suffering, while expressing uncertainty about whether adding more levity would undermine the film's overall themes and emotional impact.

== Awards and nominations ==
Year	Award	Category	Nominee	Result	Ref.
2024	77th Cannes Film Festival	Caméra d'Or	—N/a	Special Mention	
2024	2024 Golden Horse Film Festival	NETPAC Award	—N/a	Nominated	
2024	61st Golden Horse Awards	Best Leading Actor	Wanlop Rungkumjad	Nominated	
2024	61st Golden Horse Awards	Best Supporting Actor	Daniel Hong	Nominated	
2024	61st Golden Horse Awards	Best Supporting Actress	Lu Yi-ching	Nominated	
2024	61st Golden Horse Awards	Best New Director	Chiang Wei-liang, Yin You-qiao	Won	
2024	61st Golden Horse Awards	Best Cinematography	Michaël Capron	Nominated	
2024	61st Golden Horse Awards	Best Art Direction	Yeh Tzu-wei	Nominated	
2024	61st Golden Horse Awards	Best Sound Effects	R.T. Kao, Lim Ting-li, Chen Yung	Nominated	
2024	17th Asia Pacific Screen Awards	Best Cinematography	Michaël Capron	Won	
2024	25th Tokyo Filmex	Grand Prize	—N/a	Nominated	
2024	35th Singapore International Film Festival	Best Asian Feature Film	Mongrel	Won	

Wanlop Rungkumjad is the first Thai actor to be nominated for the Golden Horse Award for Best Leading Actor.
