= 61st Golden Horse Awards =

Award ceremony for Chinese-language films of 2023 and 2024

- Taipei Golden Horse Film Festival and Awards 2024 poster
- Date: November 23, 2024
- Site: Taipei Music Center, Taipei, Taiwan
- Hosted by: Liu Kuan-ting
- Preshow hosts: Pink Yang; Jake Hsu; Wang Yu-xuan
- Organized by: Taipei Golden Horse Film Festival Executive Committee

Highlights
- Best Feature Film: An Unfinished Film
- Best Director: Lou Ye; An Unfinished Film
- Best Actor: Zhang Zhiyong; Bel Ami
- Best Actress: Chung Suet Ying; The Way We Talk
- Most awards: Dead Talents Society (5)
- Most nominations: Dead Talents Society (11)

Television in Taiwan
- Network: TTV myVideo and Line Today (online streaming)

The 61st Golden Horse Awards (Chinese: 第61屆金馬獎; pinyin: Dì 61 jiè jīnmǎ jiǎng) took place on November 23, 2024, at the Taipei Music Center in Taipei, Taiwan, which marked the first time the ceremony was held at a different venue following the closure of the Sun Yat-sen Memorial Hall for major renovations.

Organized by the Taipei Golden Horse Film Festival Executive Committee, the awards honored the best works in the world of Chinese-language cinema in 2023 and 2024. Nominations were announced on October 2, 2024. Hong Kong film veteran Patrick Tam was originally slated to chair the jury, but withdrew due to the recurrence of a prior spinal injury and was subsequently replaced by Taiwanese production designer Huang Mei-ching.

Lou Ye's docufiction An Unfinished Film, set during the pandemic, won Best Narrative Feature alongside Best Director. The celebrated late actress Cheng Pei-pei and cinematographer Lin Wen-chin were honored with the Lifetime Achievement Award.

== Winners and nominees ==
Winners are listed first and highlighted in boldface.

**Best Narrative Feature**: **An Unfinished Film**; All Shall Be Well; Stranger Eyes; Dead Talents Society; Bel Ami	**Best Documentary Feature**: **From Island to Island – Lau Kek-huat**; After the Snowmelt – Lo Yi-shan; XiXi – Fan Wu; Soul of Soil – Yen Lan-chuan; Youth (Hard Times) – Wang Bing
**Best Live Action Short Film**: **Side A: A Summer Day – Wan Kin-fai**; The Burning Night – Demon Wong; 4 Sundays in September – Yong Mun-chee; Caged Dog – Yen Hao-hsuan; The Fishbowl Girl – Wu Hung-yi	**Best Documentary Short Film**: **Colour Ideology Sampling.mov – Chan Cheuk-sze, Kathy Wong**; Before Then – Xue Mengzhu; Wild Road – Chen Chiao-wei; Something About Us – Rex Ren; Letters from the Imprisoned: Chow Hang Tung – Paul Lee
**Best Animated Short Film**: **Father Figure – Shek Ka-chun**; Minus Plus Multiply – Lee Chu-chieh; Essence – Hung Wan-yu; Bad Kids – Chuang Yu-jin; Ruthless Blade – Zhang Bo	**Best Director**: **Lou Ye – An Unfinished Film**; Ray Yeung – All Shall Be Well; Yeo Siew Hua – Stranger Eyes; John Hsu – Dead Talents Society; Geng Jun – Bel Ami
**Best Leading Actor**: **Zhang Zhiyong – Bel Ami**; Jason King – A Journey in Spring; Chang Chen – The Embers; Neo Yau – The Way We Talk; Wanlop Rungkumjad – Mongrel	**Best Leading Actress**: **Chung Suet Ying – The Way We Talk**; Patra Au – All Shall Be Well; Kimi Hsia – Yen and Ai-Lee; Sylvia Chang – Daughter's Daughter; Sandra Ng – Love Lies
**Best Supporting Actor**: **Shih Ming-shuai – GATAO: Like Father Like Son**; Lee Kang-sheng – Stranger Eyes; Mo Tzu-yi – The Embers; Sam Tseng – Yen and Ai-Lee; Daniel Hong – Mongrel	**Best Supporting Actress**: **Yang Kuei-mei – Yen and Ai-Lee**; Sandrine Pinna – Dead Talents Society; Pets Tseng – BIG; Lu Yi-ching – Mongrel; Eugenie Liu – Daughter's Daughter
**Best New Director**: **Chiang Wei-liang, Yin You-qiao – Mongrel**; Qiu Yang – Some Rain Must Fall; Peng Tzu-hui, Wang Ping-wen – A Journey in Spring; Ye Xingyu – Three Castrated Goats; Ho Miu-ki – Love Lies	**Best New Performer**: **Feifei Cheng – BIG**; Yu Aier – Some Rain Must Fall; Tang Yung-hsu – Salli; Lin Cheng-hsun – Intimate Encounter; Alisia Liang – The Chronicles of Libidoists
**Best Original Screenplay**: **Daughter's Daughter – Huang Xi**; Stranger Eyes – Yeo Siew Hua; Dead Talents Society – John Hsu, Vincent Tsai; Yen and Ai-Lee – Tom Lin Shu-yu; Bel Ami – Geng Jun	**Best Adapted Screenplay**: **Above the Dust – Wang Xiaoshuai**; 18×2 Beyond Youthful Days – Michihito Fujii, Hayashida Hirokawa; GATAO: Like Father Like Son – Red Chang, Joyce Liu Lei-shuan, Chiang Hsi-wen, Shih Cheng-yu
**Best Cinematography**: **Bel Ami – Wang Weihua**; Yen and Ai-Lee – Kartik Vijay; 18×2 Beyond Youthful Days – Imamura Keisuke; Mongrel – Michaël Capron; Shambhala – Aziz Zhambakiyev	**Best Film Editing**: **Bel Ami – Chen Hoping**; XiXi – Anna Schlenker; All Shall Be Well – William Chang, Lai Kwun-tung; Yen and Ai-Lee – Tom Lin; An Unfinished Film – Tian Jiaming
**Best Original Film Score**: **Stranger Eyes – Thomas Foguenne**; Dead Talents Society – The Dead Talents; 18×2 Beyond Youthful Days – Takashi Ohmama; Locust – Yoshihiro Hanno, Meuko! Meuko!; Bel Ami – Amy Chen Xiaoshu	**Best Original Film Song**: **"Dead Talents Society" from Dead Talents Society**; **Lyricist: Chen Hong-ren**; **Composer/Performer: Joanna Wang**; "People From the North" from The Embers; Lyricist: Chung Mong-hong; Composer: Luming Lu; Performer: TMC Children's Choir; "Kiokunotabibito" from 18×2 Beyond Youthful Days; Lyricist/Composer: Kazutoshi Sakurai; Performer: Mr. Children; "Listen" from Daughter's Daughter; Lyricist/Composer/Performer: Deserts Chang; "Bel Ami" from Bel Ami; Lyricist: Geng Jun; Composer/Performer: Liang Long
**Best Makeup & Costume Design**: **Dead Talents Society – Lore Shih**; The Embers – Hsu Li-wen; Yen and Ai-Lee – Yip Kar-yan; Daughter's Daughter – Shirley Kao; Shambhala – Ramlal Khadka	**Best Art Direction**: **Dead Talents Society – Wang Chih-cheng, Liang Shuo-lin**; The Embers – Chao Shih-hao; Yen and Ai-Lee – Penny Tsai Pei-ling; Mongrel – Yeh Tzu-wei; Above the Dust – Lü Dong
**Best Sound Effects**: **From Island to Island – Chen Yi-ling, Eddie Huang, Yannick Dauby**; Stranger Eyes – Tu Duu-chih, Tu Tse-kang; Dead Talents Society – Book Chien, Tang Hsiang-chu, Chen Jia-li; The Way We Talk – Cyrus Tang Hok-lun, Mandy Kwan Wai-sum (Note: Mandy Kwan Wai-sum was not included in the initial nominations and was added retrospectively.); Mongrel – R.T Kao, Lim Ting-li, Chen Yung	**Best Action Choreography**: **Dead Talents Society – Teddy Ray Huang**; GATAO: Like Father Like Son – Hong Eui-jung; The Chronicles of Libidoists – Lin Wei-yi, Yuan Hsu-hu, Chang Ya-wei, More, Liao Hsiao-ting; Stuntman – Kong Tao-hoi, Leung Pok-yan
**Best Visual Effects**: **Dead Talents Society – Tomi Kuo, Chiu Chun-yi**; BIG – Alex Lim Hung-fung, Yee Kwok-leung, Leung Wai-kit; GATAO: Like Father Like Son – Tomotoshi Shigeharu, Gary Chen

== Honorary awards ==
Lifetime Achievement Award: Lin Wen-chin; Cheng Pei-pei (posthumous honor)	Outstanding Taiwanese Filmmaker of the Year: Li Si-jian

== Out-of-competition awards ==
Audience Choice Award: Bel Ami – Geng Jun; An Unfinished Film; Stranger Eyes; All Shall Be Well; Dead Talents Society	FIPRESCI Prize: Some Rain Must Fall – Qiu Yang; A Journey in Spring; Salli; Three Castrated Goats; Mongrel; Locust; Love Lies; Stuntman
Observation Missions for Asian Cinema Award: Happyend – Neo Sora	NETPAC Award: Montages of a Modern Motherhood – Oliver Chan; Mongrel; Some Rain Must Fall; Three Castrated Goats; Tale of the Land; MA - Cry of Silence; Regretfully at Dawn; Don't Cry, Butterfly; The Tenants; Happyend; Blossoms Under Somewhere

== Jury ==
- Huang Mei-ching, Taiwanese production designer – Convener
- Hsieh Ying-xuan, Taiwanese actress
- Giddens Ko, Taiwanese novelist and filmmaker
- Lin Chun-yang, director and cinematographer
- Toe Yuen, animation director and screenwriter
- Lien Yi-chi, director, screenwriter and producer
- Chen Ta-pu, director and cinematographer
- Wong Hin-yan, musician, singer-songwriter and actor
- Soo Mun-thye, editor
- Ho Chao-ti, producer and director
- Nicole Teoh, producer
- Fang-Yi Sheu, Taiwanese-American dancer and choreographer
- Cincin Lee, composer, arranger and music producer
- Singing Chen, Taiwanese film director and screenwriter
- Hsiao Ya-chuan, Taiwanese film director and screenwriter
- Law Chi-leung, Hong Kong film director and screenwriter
