= Wang Xuebo =

Chinese filmmaker (born 1989)

- 王学博
- Born: 4 June 1989 (age 37)
- Occupations: Film director; screenwriter; film producer
- Years active: 2015–present
- Notable work: Knife in the Clear Water

Wang Xuebo (Chinese: 王学博), born 4 June 1989) is a Chinese film director, screenwriter, and producer. He is known as the producer of the films Tharlo (2015) and Free and Easy (2016) and as the writer-director of Knife in the Clear Water (2016).

== Life and career ==
Beginning his career as a producer, Wang Xuebo made The Hammer and Sickle Are Sleeping (2013) and Free and Easy (2016), both directed by Geng Jun. Around the same time, he produced the Tibetan comedy-drama film Tharlo (2015), written and directed by Pema Tseden. Sharing Tseden's interests in slow cinema and the ethnic minorities in China, Wang wrote and directed the film Knife in the Clear Water (2016) about an elderly man in a Hui village within the mountainous region of Ningxia province.

== Filmography ==
=== Feature films ===
Year	Title	Original title	Director	Writer	Producer	Notes
2013	The Hammer and the Sickle Are Sleeping	Chui zi lian dao dou xiu xi	No	No	Yes	Mid-length film
2015	Tharlo	塔洛	No	No	Yes	Directed by Pema Tseden
2016	Knife in the Clear Water	清水里的刀子	Yes	Yes	No	Feature directorial debut
2016	Free and Easy	轻松+愉快	No	No	Yes	Directed by Geng Jun
