= Machines (film) =

- Directed by: Rahul Jain
- Cinematography: Rodrigo Trejo Villanueva
- Edited by: Yael Bitton
- Release date: 17 November 2016
- Running time: 71 minutes
- Countries: India; Germany; Finland
- Language: Hindi

Machines is a 2016 documentary by Rahul Jain. The film, Jain's debut, examines factory life at a large textile mill in Gujarat, India.

== Summary ==
The film's austere cinematography depicts a gritty factory environment where workers put in twelve hour shifts to make colorful fabrics. Interviews with the workers, interspersed with long shorts of the factory and its workers, "give the film a political edge."

== Premiers ==
The film was released on 17 November 2016 at the International Documentary Film Festival Amsterdam and played in the United States at the Sundance Film Festival on 20 January 2017.

The New York premier of the film was at the Museum of Modern Art on 16 February 2017.

== Reception and awards ==
The film has a 92% "Fresh" approval rating from Rotten Tomatoes based on 25 reviews.

Cinematographer Rodrigo Trejo Villanueva received the World Cinema Documentary Special Jury Award for Best Cinematography at the 2017 Sundance Film Festival for the film.

== See also ==
- Textile industry in India
- Indian labor law
