= The Embers (film) =

2024 Taiwanese film by Chung Mong-hong

- Theatrical poster
- Traditional Chinese: 餘燼
- Directed by: Chung Mong-hong
- Written by: Chung Mong-hong; Pierre Chu
- Produced by: Tseng Shao-chien; Arthur Chu; Tung Cheng-yu
- Starring: Chang Chen; Mo Tzu-yi; Tiffany Ann Hsu; Chin Shih-chieh; Liu Kuan-ting
- Cinematography: Chung Mong-hong
- Edited by: Lai Hsiu-hsiung
- Music by: Lu Lu-ming
- Production company: 3 NG Film
- Distributed by: Activator Co.
- Release date: 15 November 2024 (Taiwan)
- Running time: 162 minutes
- Country: Taiwan
- Language: Mandarin

The Embers (Chinese: 餘燼) is a 2024 Taiwanese crime drama film directed by Chung Mong-hong. The film features an ensemble cast led by Chang Chen and Mo Tzu-yi, along with Tiffany Ann Hsu, Chin Shih-chieh, Liu Kuan-ting, Nina Paw, Chen Yi-wen, Wang Po-chieh, and Frederick Lee. It explores Taiwan's history through the story of a police detective (Chang) and an orphaned child (Mo) investigating his father's death while uncovering mysteries from Taiwan's past.

The film premiered theatrically in Taiwan on 15 November 2024. It received five nominations in the 61st Golden Horse Awards.

== Premise ==
In 2006, a police detective begins investigating two connected murder cases that lead back to a communist spy case from 1956, where the victims' fathers are all linked to a reading club. Along the way, the detective crosses paths with a food factory owner who is also probing his father's mysterious death.

== Cast ==
- Chang Chen as Chang Chen-tze
- Mo Tzu-yi as Mo Tzu-fan
- Tiffany Ann Hsu as Ms. Hsu
- Chin Shih-chieh as Hsu Shih-chieh
- Liu Kuan-ting as Tsai Hsiao
- Nina Paw as Mrs. Chang
- Chen Yi-wen as Captain Chen
- Wang Po-chieh as Hwang Chun-sheng
- Frederick Lee as Chao Chih-liang

Also starring in the film are Esther Huang, Umin Boya, Phil Hou, and Wu Chien-ho. Zhang Zhiyong made a cameo appearance in the film.

== Production ==
After completing The Falls (2021), director Chung Mong-hong teased the development of an upcoming project focused on Taiwan's history and political situation in an interview with The Hollywood Reporter in September 2021, where he was working on the screenplay at that time and planned to begin filming in the summer or fall of 2022. As his seventh feature film, Chung described The Embers as the most challenging project he has directed, citing the lengthy filming period and the wide range of shooting locations across Taiwan.

Principal photography wrapped up in August 2023, with Chang Chen, Chen Yi-wen, Chin Shih-chieh, Liu Kuan-ting, and Mo Tzu-yi announced as part of the cast. An official trailer was released on 13 September 2024, with Tiffany Ann Hsu, Nina Paw, Wang Po-chieh, and Frederick Lee revealed to be in lead roles. Esther Huang was announced to be part of the ensemble in the same month.

== Release ==
The Embers premiered theatrically on 15 November 2024 in Taiwan.

== Critical reception ==
Estella Huang, writing for Mirror Media, found The Embers relying too heavily on dialogue, sacrificing the power of visual storytelling, which leads to a lack of depth in character development and a weakened engagement with its historical themes, despite strong performances from the cast. Wu Lao-pai of CommonWealth Magazine criticized the film for its attempt to explore Taiwan's White Terror history through a crime suspense narrative, arguing that it ultimately falls short due to "overly simplistic" dialogues, one-dimensional and "NPC-like" characters, and Chung's lack of understanding of the historical period, which he believes may lead to misunderstandings among viewers about history. Wen Wen-kai, reviewing for The News Lens, also bashed on the film, asserting that it humiliates the victims of the White Terror and their descendants by blurring the lines between perpetrators and victims, portraying the latter as new evildoers while failing to genuinely address their pain or the historical context, ultimately trivializing serious issues and misrepresenting the concept of reconciliation.

Ma Hsin of Okapi found the film falling short in its ambition, stating that it fails to explore the complexities of historical trauma or present well-rounded characters, relying too heavily on dialogue and lacking the depth needed to convey the pain and nuances of its subjects, ultimately trivializing the significance of reconciliation and leaving viewers with an incomplete narrative. Lan Tsu-wei, also writing for Mirror Media, offered a rather positive review and praised the film as a multifaceted story that "combines sensory enjoyment" with "deep emotional engagement", examining themes of truth, justice, and the complexities of father-son relationships.

== Awards and nominations ==
Year	Award	Category	Nominee	Result	Ref.
2024	61st Golden Horse Awards	Best Leading Actor	Chang Chen	Nominated	
2024	61st Golden Horse Awards	Best Supporting Actor	Mo Tzu-yi	Nominated	
2024	61st Golden Horse Awards	Best Art Direction	Chao Shih-hao	Nominated	
2024	61st Golden Horse Awards	Best Makeup & Costume Design	Hsu Li-wen	Nominated	
2024	61st Golden Horse Awards	Best Original Film Song	"People From the North"	Nominated	
