= Rima Zeidan =

Taiwanese actress

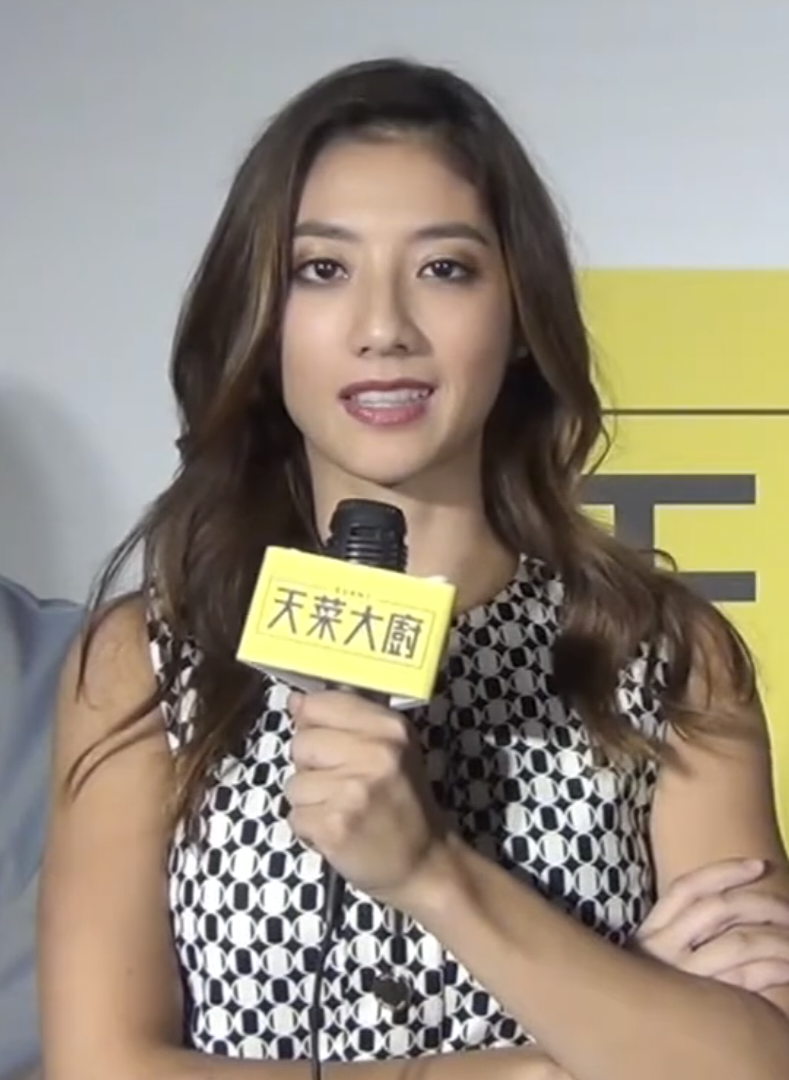
- Zeidan in 2015
- Born: May 1, 1990 (age 36); Taiwan
- Occupations: Actress; model; TV presenter

Rima Zeidan (Chinese: 瑞瑪·席丹; pinyin: ruìmǎ xídān; Arabic: ريما زيدان; born May 1, 1990) is a Taiwanese-Lebanese presenter, model and actress from Taiwan. In 2017 she appeared in the film Missing Johnny for which she was voted Best New Talent at the Taipei Film Festival and won the Golden Horse Award for Best New Performer.

== Life and career ==
Zeidan was born in 1990 in Taiwan to a Taiwanese mother and a Lebanese father. She entered showbiz at the age of sixteen, appearing in over 100 television adverts and hosting Taiwanese tourism programs. In 2009 at the age of 18, while in the United States on a study trip she was involved in a motorcycle accident which killed her boyfriend and left her with third degree burns on over 30% of her body. After recovering, she returned to the industry to become the face of skincare companies and hosted on various travel programs.

In 2017, Zeidan made her film debut in the Taiwanese movie Missing Johnny in which she played the role of a woman named Hsu Zi-qi. Zeidan's performance in the film was widely praised leading to her being nominated for best actress awards at the 54th Golden Horse Awards, the Taipei Film Awards and the Shanghai International Film Festival.

== Filmography ==
=== Film ===
Year	English title	Chinese title	Role	Notes
2017	Missing Johnny	強尼·凱克	Hsu Zi-qi	
2023	The Movie Emperor	红毯先生	Summer	
2023	Hidden Strike	狂怒沙暴	Li Yan	
