= Huang Xi =

Taiwanese filmmaker (born 1976)

- 黃熙
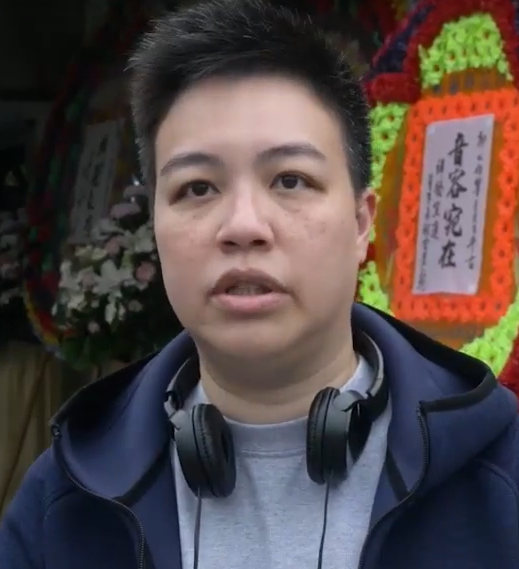
- Huang in April 2022
- Born: Huang Xi; 1976 (age 49–50); Taipei, Taiwan
- Education: New York University (BA)
- Occupations: Director; screenwriter
- Years active: 2017–present

Huang Xi (Chinese: 黃熙; pinyin: Huáng Xī; born 1976) is a Taiwanese filmmaker. She made her directorial debut with Missing Johnny (2017), for which she won Best Screenplay in the 19th Taipei Film Awards. In 2024, she won Best Original Screenplay in the 61st Golden Horse Awards for her second feature Daughter's Daughter.

== Early life ==
Huang was born in 1976 in Taipei, Taiwan, and she grew up in that city. Huang's father was a high school classmate of filmmaker Hou Hsiao-hsien and was involved in the funding of Hou's 1985 film Taipei Story. She visited Hou's production set at a young age, which sparked her interest in film. Since childhood, she has been fascinated by Hong Kong films and cites the works of Wong Kar-wai, Raymond Wong, and John Woo as major influences on her aesthetics. She completed her elementary education in Taiwan and continued her studies in Singapore and Vancouver. By high school in Vancouver, she took a filmmaking course and produced several short films, further deepening her interest in pursuing filmmaking. She enrolled at the New York University Tisch School of the Arts in 1994 and later earned a Bachelor of Arts in cinema studies.

== Career ==
Huang interned as a production assistant on Hou Hsiao-hsien's production crew for his 1996 film Goodbye South, Goodbye. After graduation, she returned to Taipei in 2000, and joined Hou's production company Sino Movie for two years. She then left the film industry due to her family's financial struggles and pursued a career in digital marketing. Eventually, she transitioned her career and opened a public relations company. In her thirties, Huang faced a serious illness that resulted in hospitalization, which prompted her to reflect on what she truly wanted to do, ultimately realizing her passion for filmmaking. She then returned to Hou's crew and worked as an assistant director on the 2015 film The Assassin.

Encouraged by Hou, Huang began writing a screenplay during the production of The Assassin. Hou served as the producer, and she invited film score composer Lim Giong, editor Liao Ching-sung, and cinematographer Yao Hung-i, the frequent collaborators of Hou whom she had met while working on his crew, to join the project. Due to her inexperience in scriptwriting, Huang wrote several prose-like short stories, which she later combined into a full screenplay that became her debut feature Missing Johnny. The film was released in 2017 when Huang was 40 years old. Richard Kuipers of Variety praised Huang's "richly layered screenplay" and "meticulous direction", calling the film "an elegantly composed mood piece"; while Wen Tien-hsiang of Mirror Media remarked that her screenplay was "expansive but challenging to wrap up effectively". Huang won Best Screenplay in the 19th Taipei Film Awards and received a nomination for Best New Director in the 54th Golden Horse Awards.

After filming Missing Johnny, Huang moved to Los Angeles. She later returned to Taiwan to work with Hou Hsiao-hsien on another project, the HBO Asia fantasy series Twisted Strings, where she served as director and Hou as producer once again. Chien Ying-jou, writing for United Daily News, praised the genre-bending narrative and called it "an experiment on the future of Taiwanese drama". Hou received nominations for both Best Directing and Best Writing in the 57th Golden Bell Awards, and Twisted Strings won Best Miniseries. During her time in Los Angeles, Huang also conceived and began writing a screenplay that eventually developed into her second feature film Daughter's Daughter, which premiered at the 49th Toronto International Film Festival in competition for the Platform Prize in 2024. Josh Slater-Williams of IndieWire commended Huang's "patient storytelling" and "riskier writing tricks", which delivered a "deeply moving" story; while Wendy Ide of Screen Daily called the film "elegant and affecting". Huang won Best Original Screenplay in the 61st Golden Horse Awards with the film.

== Filmography ==
Year	Title	Director	Screenwriter	Notes/Ref.
1996	Goodbye South, Goodbye	No	No	As production assistant
2015	The Assassin	No	No	As assistant director
2017	Missing Johnny	Yes	Yes	
2022	Twisted Strings	Yes	Yes	
2024	Daughter's Daughter	Yes	Yes	

== Awards and nominations ==
Year	Award	Category	Work	Result	Ref.
2017	54th Golden Horse Awards	Best New Director	Missing Johnny	Nominated	
2017	19th Taipei Film Awards	Best Screenplay	Missing Johnny	Won	
2022	57th Golden Bell Awards	Best Directing for a Miniseries or Television Film	Twisted Strings	Nominated	
2022	57th Golden Bell Awards	Best Writing for a Miniseries or Television Film	Twisted Strings	Nominated	
2024	61st Golden Horse Awards	Best Original Screenplay	Daughter's Daughter	Won	
