= Nine One One (band) =

Taiwanese musical group

- Born: Taichung, Taiwan
- Years active: 2009–present

Chinese name
- Traditional Chinese: 玖壹壹
Transcriptions
Standard Mandarin
- Hanyu Pinyin: Jiǔ yī yī
- Musical career
- Origin: Taichung, Taiwan
- Genres: Taiwanese hip hop, rap
- Label: Rock Records
- Members: Daniel Hong "Spring Breeze" (洪瑜鴻); Liao Chien-chih "Ken G" (廖建至); Chern Hawyeu "Onion" (陳皓宇)
- Website: www.facebook.com/JiuYiYi/

Nine One One (Chinese: 玖壹壹; Pe̍h-ōe-jī: Kiú-it-it) is a Taiwanese hip hop group from Taichung, Taiwan, composed of Daniel Hong Yu-hong (洪瑜鴻), Liao Chien-chih (廖建至), and Chern Hawyeu (陳皓宇). The group was formed on September 11, 2009, and began performing at temple festivals and night clubs. In 2016, the group was nominated for Best Group at the 27th Golden Melody Awards and was invited to perform at the venue. The music video for Nine One One's 2015 single "9453", featuring scenery from Penghu County, has been viewed over 50 million times on YouTube. They have two music videos, "Love Roses" and "Hip Hop Country" on the list of most-viewed Chinese music videos on YouTube.
