= Free and Easy (2016 film) =

2016 Hong Kong film by Geng Jun

- Film poster
- Directed by: Geng Jun
- Written by: Yuhua Feng; Jun Geng; Bing Liu
- Produced by: Wang Zijian; Wang Xuebo; Guo Dong; Wu Leilei
- Starring: Xu Gang; Zhang Zhiyong; Xue Baohe; Gu Benbin; Zhang Xun; Yuan Liguo
- Cinematography: Wang Weihua
- Edited by: Guo Xiaodong; Zhong Yijuan
- Music by: Second Hand Rose
- Production companies: Blackfin (Beijing) Culture & Media Co., Ltd.
- Release date: 5 November 2016 (UCCA, Beijing)
- Running time: 99 minutes
- Country: Hong Kong
- Language: Mandarin

Free and Easy (Chinese: 轻松+愉快; pinyin: Qīngsōng + Yúkuài) is a 2016 Hong Kong comedy film directed by Chinese filmmaker Geng Jun. It was screened at the Ullens Center for Contemporary Art (UCCA) in Beijing on 5 November 2016. It was also screened in the World Cinema Dramatic Competition section of the 2017 Sundance Film Festival. It was the recipient of the People's Jury Award at the Five Flavours Film Festival in 2017.

== Cast ==
- Xu Gang
- Zhang Zhiyong
- Xue Baohe
- Gu Benbin
- Zhang Xun
- Yuan Liguo

== Reception ==
=== Critical reception ===
On review aggregator website Rotten Tomatoes, the film holds an approval rating of 100% based on 6 reviews, and an average rating of 6.5/10.

=== Awards and nominations ===
Awards	Category	Recipient	Result	Ref.
54th Golden Horse Awards	Best Feature Film	Free and Easy	Nominated	
54th Golden Horse Awards	Best Director	Geng Jun	Nominated	
54th Golden Horse Awards	Best Cinematography	Wang Weihua	Nominated	
54th Golden Horse Awards	Best Original Film Song	"Lullaby"; Composer: Second Hand Rose; Lyrics & Performer: Liang Long	Nominated	
Pune International Film Festival	Best Film (International) 2017	Free and Easy	Won	
