= Five Flavours Film Festival =

Polish film festival

- Location: Warsaw, Poland
- Founded: 2007
- Language: Polish; English
- Website: piecsmakow.pl

Five Flavours Film Festival (Polish: Festiwal Filmowy Pięć Smaków) is an annual film festival held in Warsaw, Poland. It is focused on the cinema of Southeast and East Asia. It commenced in 2007 as a Vietnamese film review and later expanded to include films from other Asian nations, to become one of the most important events of its kind in Europe. Among its guests were many revered Asian filmmakers, including Fruit Chan, Noboru Iguchi, Miwa Nishikawa, Pen-Ek Ratanaruang, Pema Tseden and Midi Z. The festival also engages in educational projects, publishes books on Asian film and, since 2017, it has also started acting as a film distribution company, bringing selected Asian films to broader Polish audience.

== New Asian Cinema competition ==
=== People's Jury Award ===
The People's Jury is composed of non-professionals (such as bloggers and film students of all ages) interested in Asian cinema and culture. To participate, the volunteers apply by sending short essays or visual impressions on Asian film. This criterion for jury selection is quite unique among film festivals worldwide. There was no competitive section during the first five editions of the festival (2007–2011), thus, the first prize was awarded in 2012. The 2020 edition was conducted exclusively online due to the COVID-19 pandemic.

Year	Film	Original title	Director	Country
2012	P-047	แต่เพียงผู้เดียว	Kongdej Jaturanrasamee	Thailand
2013	36		Nawapol Thamrongrattanarit	Thailand
2014	Exit	迴光奏鳴曲	Chienn Hsiang	Taiwan
2015	0.5 mm	0.5ミリ	Momoko Ando	Japan
2016	Apocalypse Child		Mario Cornejo	Philippines
2017	Free and Easy	轻松+愉快	Geng Jun	Hong Kong
2018	Die Tomorrow	ดาย ทูมอร์โรว์	Nawapol Thamrongrattanarit	Thailand
2019	Balloon	气球	Pema Tseden	China
2021	Spring Tide	春潮	Yang Tian-yi	China
2022	Arnold is a Model Student	อานนเป็นนักเรียนตัวอย่าง	Sorayos Prapapan	Thailand
2023	A Wild Roomer	괴인	Lee Jeong-hong	South Korea
2024	Monisme		Riar Rizaldi	Indonesia
2025	An Errand		Dominic Bekaert	Philippines

=== Netpac Jury Award ===
Apart from the People's Jury, there was a separate jury during 2016 and 2017 editions of the festival. It was helmed by the NETPAC organization. Their awards went to Tharlo (Pema Tseden, China) in 2016 and Marlina the Murderer in Four Acts (Mouly Surya, Indonesia) in 2017.
