= Golden Horse Audience Choice Award =

Taiwanese film award

- Location: Taiwan
- Presented by: Taipei Golden Horse Film Festival Executive Committee
- First award: 1992
- Currently held by: Bel Ami (2024)
- Website: www.goldenhorse.org.tw

The Golden Horse Audience Choice Award (Chinese: 金馬獎觀眾票選最佳影片) is an out-of-competition award presented annually at the Golden Horse Awards by the Taipei Golden Horse Film Festival Executive Committee. The award is determined by votes of selected audience from the nominated films of Best Narrative Feature. The winner is announced and presented at Nominee Party on the eve of the Awards Ceremony. As of the 2024 Golden Horse Awards, Bel Ami, directed by Geng Jun, won the award.

== Winners and nominees ==
=== 2020s ===
Year	English title	Original title	Director(s)	Ref.
2020 (57th)	Classmates Minus	同學麥娜絲	Huang Hsin-yao	
2021 (58th)	American Girl	美國女孩	Fiona Roan Feng-i	
2022 (59th)	Limbo	智齒	Soi Cheang	
2023 (60th)	Time Still Turns the Pages	年少日記	Nick Cheuk	
2024 (61st)	Bel Ami	漂亮朋友	Geng Jun	
