= Daniel Hong =

Taiwanese actor and musician (born 1986)

- 洪瑜鴻
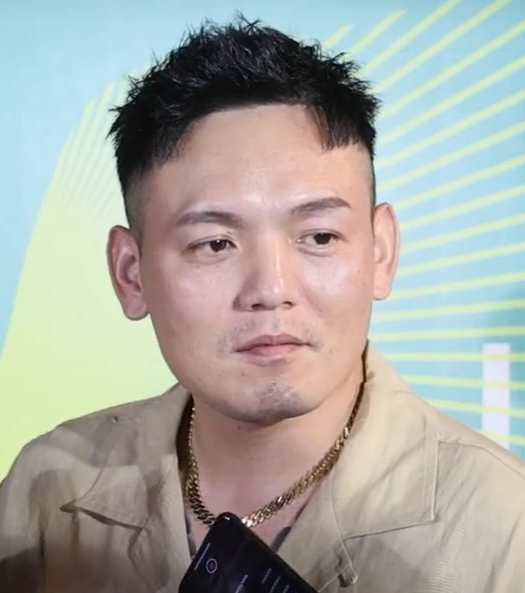
- Hong in August 2023
- Born: Hong Yu-hong; 9 October 1986 (age 40); Fangyuan, Changhua County, Taiwan
- Occupations: Actor; rapper
- Years active: 2009–present

Daniel Hong Yu-hong (Chinese: 洪瑜鴻; born 9 October 1986), also known by his stage name Spring Wind (春風), is a Taiwanese actor and rapper. Debuting as the leader and rapper of the band Nine One One in 2009, he gained prominence with the group's single "Men's Romance" in 2012 and receiving nominations for Best Group in both the 27th and 34th Golden Melody Awards. Hong made his acting debut in 2022 with the crime film Bad Education, and he starred as the male lead Tai in the romantic comedy Miss Shampoo (2023), for which he was nominated for Best New Performer in the 60th Golden Horse Awards. In 2024, Hong landed another lead role as Hsing in the multinational drama film Mongrel, earning him a nomination for Best Supporting Actor in the 61st Golden Horse Awards.

== Early life ==
Hong was born on 9 October 1986, in Fangyuan, Changhua County, Taiwan. He grew up in a financially struggling household, and at one point, his mother was abducted by debtors due to his parents' inability to repay their debts. While attending a private junior high school, he was in an elite class but became less academically motivated, recalling that he "made friends with negative influences". He decided against studying at a prestigious high school and instead attended a vocational school with his friends, where he spent eight years to complete his education. He joined a gang in Taichung around the age of 16 to 17. He originally worked at a gas station but eventually became involved in loan sharking due to his family's financial difficulties, becoming a debtor himself and primarily operating in Chiayi. He was involved in an armed conflict resulting in two deaths, and was implicated in another case that nearly led to his arrest. However, Hong left gang life after his mother died from cancer, with her last words urging him to turn his life around. He then met Chern Hawyeu and Liao Chien-chih, who were interested in forming a band, through a mutual friend and agreed to join them.

== Career ==
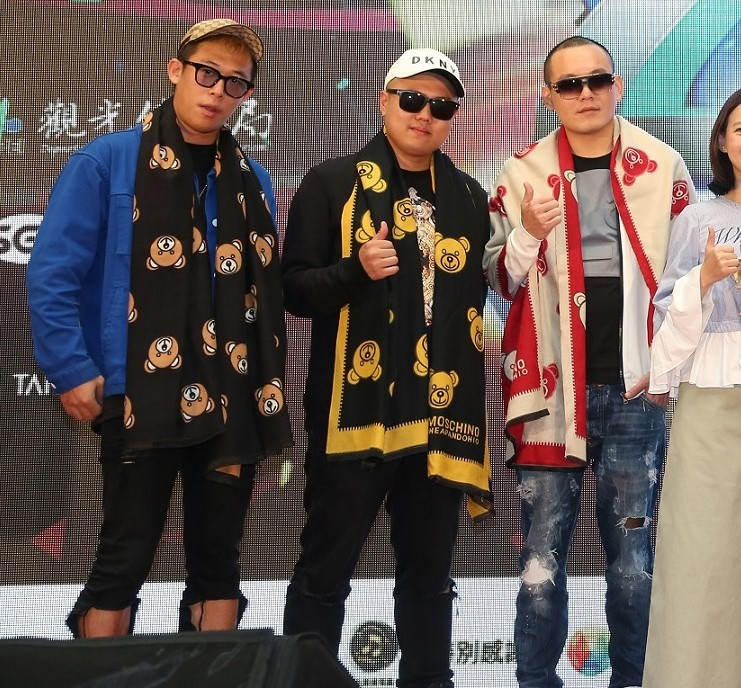
Liao Chien-chih, Chern Hawyeu, and Hong (right) at the Taipei New Year's Eve Party in December 2016

In 2009, Hong formed the band Nine One One alongside Chern Hawyeu and Liao Chien-chih in Taichung, and served as the band's leader. The band initially performed locally at nightclubs, temples, and schools. They rose to prominence in 2012 with their original single "Men's Romance", which accumulated over 27 million views online as of 2016. The band released their first album Phah Thih in 2014, which featured several songs that Chern and Liao composed before Hong joined the band. Hong and his bandmates produced a short film titled Good Friends, which documented the past lives of the three members, with Hong sharing his experiences from his gangster days. In 2016, the band was nominated for Best Group in the 27th Golden Melody Awards. In 2023, they was once again nominated for Best Group in the 34th Golden Melody Awards.

In 2010, Hong appeared as an extra in the gangster film Monga, portraying a thug under Ethan Juan's character. In 2016, he made a cameo appearance alongside his bandmates as themselves in the comedy film The Big Power. In 2022, Hong began transitioning to an acting career, a decision he described as "not part of his original plan", but he discovered a genuine interest in acting. He made his acting debut in Kai Ko's drama film Bad Education as a gangster named Tai.

Hong received his first leading role as Tai in Giddens Ko's 2023 romantic comedy film Miss Shampoo, and also composed and performed the film's theme song with his Nine One One bandmates. He was recommended to Ko by singer Jeffrey Huang, who had originally been cast as the lead but dropped out of the project. Ko, who also produced Bad Education, recognized Hong's acting potential after observing his performance on set. Alex Chung of HK01 praised Hong's debut performance as "precise", adequately capturing the essence of his character; while Estella Huang of Mirror Media described his performance as "competent" and noted his chemistry with co-star Vivian Sung. Hong was nominated for Best New Performer in the 60th Golden Horse Awards and Best New Talent in the 26th Taipei Film Awards.

In 2024, he secured another leading role as Hsing, a gangster overseeing illegal migrant caregivers, in the Taiwan-Singaporean-French drama film Mongrel. Director Chiang Wei-liang deemed him suitable for the role after watching a short film in which Hong starred, and approached him at the premiere of Bad Education. Hong received another nomination for Best Supporting Actor in the 61st Golden Horse Awards. He is set to star in another lead role as a retired gas station owner in the upcoming crime film All Journey Toward Death.

== Filmography ==
=== Film ===
Year	Title	Role	Notes/Ref.
2010	Monga	Thug	Cast extra
2016	The Big Power	Himself	Special appearance
2022	Bad Education	Tai (泰哥)	
2023	Miss Shampoo	Tai (泰哥)	
2024	Mongrel	Hsing (阿興)	
TBA	All Journey Toward Death †	TBA	

== Awards and nominations ==
Year	Award	Category	Work	Result	Ref.
2023	60th Golden Horse Awards	Best New Performer	Miss Shampoo	Nominated	
2024	26th Taipei Film Awards	Best New Talent	Miss Shampoo	Nominated	
2024	61st Golden Horse Awards	Best Supporting Actor	Mongrel	Nominated	
