= Knife in the Clear Water =

- Official release film poster
- Directed by: Wang Xuebo
- Written by: Wang Xuebo; Shi Shuqing; Ma Jinlian; Ma Yue
- Produced by: Wang Xuebo; Wang Zijian; Chen Cheng; Chen Jian
- Starring: Yang Shengcang; Yang Shengcang (Note: There are two actors with the same name); Zhou Jinhua; Yang Fan; Yang Xue
- Cinematography: Wang Weihua
- Edited by: Guo Xiaodong; Liao Ching-sung; Wang Xuebo
- Music by: Lim Giong
- Production companies: Beijing Ocean & Time Culture Communication Co., Ltd. Zhejiang Jiashang Film and Media Co., Ltd.
- Release date: 2016
- Running time: 93 minutes
- Country: China
- Language: Mandarin

Knife in the Clear Water (Chinese: 清水里的刀子, Knife in Pure Water) is a 2016 Chinese drama film written and directed by Wang Xuebo. The film follows an elderly Hui man who faces internal struggle regarding the upcoming sacrifice of his family's bull as part of his wife's funerary rituals. The film won awards at the Marrakech International Film Festival, the 21st Busan International Film Festival, and the Vancouver International Film Festival. It is Wang's directorial debut and has been compared to slow cinema.

== Plot ==
After the burial of his wife, elderly widower Ma Zishan (Yang Shengcang) must plan for the Arba'een ceremony forty days after his wife's passing. His son (Yang Shengcang; same name) asks him to sacrifice the family's only bull in order to feed the quantity of guests coming to the ceremony and to honor his wife. The bull is too old to work the fields, and yet Ma Zishan feels a sympathy for the animal. One day, the bull stops eating and becomes weak. Ma Zishan prays, consults with an Imam, and reads from the Qur'an to help work through his lingering guilt. Traditional belief says that when an animal is about to be sacrificed it sees the knife reflected in the water.

== Production ==
In 2009-2010, Wang and his team lived in the Hui village for 10 months, taking the time to write the script and understand cultural barriers. One such barrier was the Hui belief that acting was haram. Wang also made three short documentaries during his stay, titled the Xihaigu trilogy (西海固三部曲).

Despite further struggles in finding the funds for a film with non-professional Hui actors, the entire film was made in the mountainous Xihaigu area of Ningxia province and required months of pre-production. Wang chose to use the Academy aspect ratio based on his inspiration from filmmaker Andrei Tarkovsky and painters Andrew Wyeth and Jean-Francois Millet. While the area normally receives no rainfall, there were downpours and even snowfall during the shoot which required Wang to modify the script based on the weather.

== Reception ==
In Variety, the magazine's chief Asia film critic Maggie Lee wrote that while "the downbeat, sparsely-plotted yarn risks turning into an ethnographic pastoral at times ... some audiences may understandably tune out the film's sleepy rhythm," she commended the film for focusing on imagery and minimalism over dialogue-driven drama, noting that the film "[transports] audiences into a symbolic realm where the old man's inner landscape mirrors the barren, snow-blanketed exterior" of the Hui's mountainous Ningxia.
