= Tonislav Hristov =

Bulgarian filmmaker (born 1978)

Тонислав Христов Tonislav Hristov
- Born: Tonislav Hristov; 18 December 1978 (age 47); Vratza, Bulgaria
- Years active: 2001 - present

Tonislav Hristov (Bulgarian: Тонислав Христов; born 18 December 1978, in Vratza, Bulgaria) is a Bulgarian filmmaker. He moved to Finland in 2001.

- Art High school, Vratza 1993-1997
- Technical University, Rouse 1997-2002
- Media school Yle/Etno-Basaari, Helsinki 2004
- Media school Yle/MUNDO, Helsinki 2005-2007
- Metropolia University, Helsinki 2005-2007 / Film Director
- Berlinale Talent Campus, Doc Station 2009
- Documentary Campus, Masterschool 2013
- Dok. Incubator 2016
- Other courses

== Documentaries and short movies ==
- 2019 The Magic Life of V, Tonislav Hristov – director, editor
- 2016 The Good Postman, Tonislav Hristov – director, editor
- 2015 Once Upon A Dream, Tonislav Hristov – director, editor, producer
- 2014 Love & Engineering, Tonislav Hristov – director
- 2013 Soul Food Stories, Tonislav Hristov – director, editor, producer
- 2011 Rules of Single Life, Tonislav Hristov – director
- 2007/2008 Virtual Love, Tonislav Hristov – director, producer (TV Documentary)
- 2006/2007 Family Fortune, Tonislav Hristov – director
- 2006 Searching for Hapines, Tonislav Hristov – director, camera, editor, producer (TV documentary)
- 2005/ 2006 My brother Fedja, Tonislav Hristov – director, camera, editor, producer (TV documentary)
- 2005 9 shorts / Yle Mundo, Tonislav Hristov – director, producer (TV documentary)
- 2005 Helcules, Tonislav Hristov – director, camera, editor (TV documentary)
- 2004/20505 On a trip / YLE Basaari, Tonislav Hristov – director, camera, editor, producer (TV documentary)
- 2004 Kids / YLE Bassari, Tonislav Hristov – director, camera, editor (TV documentary)
- 2003 Better Life, Tonislav Hristov – director, camera, editor (TV documentary)
- 2003/2004 In the face of dead, Kiti Luostarinen – technical assistant
- 2003/2004 3 Rooms of Melancholia, Pirjo Honkasalo – technical assistant
