= The Workers Cup =

The Workers Cup is a 2017 documentary film. It depicts the migrant construction workers in Qatar preparing for the 2022 FIFA World Cup.
