= Winnie (2017 film) =

2017 South African biographical film

- Directed by: Pascale Lamche
- Produced by: Christoph Jörg; Steven Markovitz
- Cinematography: Heikki Färm; Nic Hofmeyr; Felix Meyburgh Jr. Olivier Raffet
- Edited by: Giles Gardner
- Music by: Daniel Hamburger
- Distributed by: Pumpernickel Films; Submarine Films; Big World Cinema
- Release date: 4 June 2017 (South Africa)
- Running time: 98 min.
- Country: South Africa
- Language: English

Winnie , is a 2017 South African biographical documentary film directed by Pascale Lamche and produced by Christoph Jörg and Steven Markovitz for Pumpernickel Films, Submarine Films, Big World Cinema.

The film deals with the life of Winnie Madikizela-Mandela and her tireless struggle to bring down Apartheid in South Africa. The film was screened as a part of the Human Rights Festival 2019. In the same year, Lamche won the award for the Best Director for International Documentary at Sundance Film Festival. It was also nominated at Africa Movie Academy Awards for Best Documentary.

== Cast ==
- Winnie Madikizela-Mandela as self
- Anné-Mariè Bezdrop – author of 'Winnie Mandela: A Life', as self
- Zindzi Mandela – daughter of Winnie Madikizela-Mandela and Nelson Mandela, as self
- Sophie Mokoena – political editor, South African Broadcasting Corporation, as self
- Norah Moahloli – resident of Brandfort, as self
- Anton Harber – former editor of the Weekly Mail, as self
- Dali Mpofu – lawyer, as self
- Vic McPherson – former security branch operative of South African Police, as self
- Niel Barnard – former head of South Africa's National Intelligence Service, as self
- Teboho Murdoch as self
- Nelson Mandela – (archive footage)
- George Bizos – lawyer, as self
- Henk Heslinga – former chief of police, as self
- Ishmael Semenya as self

== International screening ==
The film has screened in several international film festivals and received positive critical reviews.

- USA – 22 January 2017 at Sundance Film Festival
- USA – 31 May 2017 at Seattle International Film Festival
- South Africa – 4 June 2017 at Encounters South African International Documentary Festival
- Australia – 11 June 2017 at Sydney Film Festival
- Italy – 15 June 2017 at Biografilm Festival
- Netherlands – 22 June 2017
- Israel – 16 July 2017 at Jerusalem Film Festival
- Australia – 17 August 2017 at Melbourne International Film Festival
- Canada – 7 October 2017 at Vancouver International Film Festival
- Poland – 16 October 2017 at Warsaw Film Festival
- UK – 16 August 2018 at London Feminist Film Festival
