= Tracy Drain =

NASA flight systems engineer

- Official NASA profile photograph, 2008
- Education: Mechanical Engineering, University of Kentucky
- Occupation: Systems Engineer
- Employer: NASA
- Spouse: Ted Drain (Married 2003 - present)

Tracy Drain is a flight systems engineer at NASA's Jet Propulsion Laboratory. She is the deputy chief engineer for the JUNO mission, which arrived at Jupiter in June 2016.

== Education ==
Tracy Drain was born in Louisville, Kentucky. She was always curious about space and the formation of the Solar System, and decided to study mechanical engineering in 11th Grade while at Waggener High School. Drain was a big fan of Star Trek, Star Wars and Battlestar Galactica. Throughout high school she competed in mathematics competitions and insisted on watching Space Shuttle launches on television. Drain received a bachelor's degree Mechanical Engineering from University of Kentucky in 1998 and a master's degree in mechanical engineering from the Georgia Institute of Technology in 2000. She was the first person in her immediate family to receive a college degree. Whilst studying at university, she spent two summers as an intern for NASA Langley. She interviewed for several aerospace companies before settling on JPL, which she chose because she felt "that their mission was my mission: the robotic exploration of space".

== Career ==
Drain at Worldcon 2026

Drain joined JPL immediately after graduating in 2000, working on the Mars Reconnaissance Orbiter. After the launch in 2005, Drain was promoted to lead systems engineer. Drain joined the Kepler project in 2007 as the Missions Readiness Lead, hunting for Earth-like planets, staying until Kepler checked-out in 2009. In 2009, she joined Juno, which is studying the gravity and magnetic fields of Jupiter. She is Technical Group Supervisor for the Flight Systems Engineering group. She has worked for NASA for more than 17 years. Drain worked on the Psyche mission, studying the largest known metal asteroid in the Solar System, launching in 2022. Drain is currently the lead flight systems engineer for NASA's Europa Clipper mission, set to launch in 2024 to the Jupiter system to study one of Jupiter's moons.

== Public engagement ==
Actor and space tourist astronaut William Shatner with Drain at the Jet Propulsion Laboratory in 2016.

Tracy Drain is involved with a range of activities to communicate her enthusiasm for engineering with the public. She is an Exchange Consultant for the National Academy of Sciences, a program that connects the entertainment industry with scientists and engineers to create accurate science in both film and TV. Drain was a Jury Member for the 2017 Sundance Festival. She has spoken about women in film and engineering alongside Diane Kruger at the Sloan Film Summit. She takes every opportunity to encourage girls and young people into STEM careers. Drain was involved with the promotion of the 2016 20th Century Fox film Hidden Figures, in a series of films entitled Hidden Figures, Modern Figures, and took part in several panel discussions. In 2017 Drain gave a TEDx talk at the ArtCentre College of Design, "Beauty of the Fall".

== Awards ==
- 2007 - NASA Exceptional Achievement Medal for exceptional performance in the development of the Mars Reconnaissance Orbiter Mission's transition to Science Phase Activities
- 2009 - NASA Exceptional Achievement Medal for exceptional achievement in guiding and managing the Kepler Launch, Commissioning and Science Operations readiness effort
- 2015 - JPL Bruce Murray Award for exceptional support for the education of minority and female STEM students through community programs, distance learning and public events
- 2015 - Women in Engineering ProActive Network Women in Engineering Champion Award

== Personal ==
Tracy Drain is married to fellow JPL engineer, Ted Drain.
