= Nell Greenfieldboyce =

American journalist

- Born: May 1974 (age 51–52); Plainfield, New Jersey
- Occupation: Journalist

Nell Greenfieldboyce (née Nell Louise Boyce) is an American radio journalist. She is a former science and technology reporter for National Public Radio (NPR) and lives in Washington, DC.

== Education and career ==
Greenfieldboyce attended the Warren public schools and Watchung Hills Regional High School. She took part in summer schools run by the Center for Talented Youth at Johns Hopkins University. Graduating from high school one year early, she subsequently earned a Bachelor of Arts in social sciences (history of science with writing) and a Master of Arts in science writing from Johns Hopkins. She spent only three years as an undergraduate, while in her fourth year she received a journalism scholarship to continue on for a master's degree. As an undergraduate she interned at UPI and the Johns Hopkins University Medical School Public Relations Office, read copy for the student radio station, and was selected for Phi Beta Kappa. For her master's project, she traveled to Boston to interview Dr. Judah Folkman.

Beginning in 1995, for a decade she wrote on science and technology in print media: Clinical Laboratory News, New Scientist, and U.S. News & World Report. She also taught at her alma mater.

She received the 1998 Evert Clark/Seth Payne Award for Young Science Journalists.

Greenfieldboyce was laid off from NPR in 2026, after more than 20 years with the broadcaster.

== Works ==
- Transient and Strange. W. W. Norton. 2024-01-16. ISBN 978-0-393-88234-6.
