= Geng Jun =

Chinese independent filmmaker (born 1976)

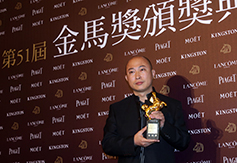
- Geng Jun in 2014
- Born: February 4, 1976 (age 49); Hegang, Heilongjiang, China
- Occupations: Film director; screenwriter; executive producer

Chinese name
- Traditional Chinese: 耿軍
- Simplified Chinese: 耿军
Transcriptions
Standard Mandarin
- Hanyu Pinyin: Gěng Jūn

Geng Jun (Chinese: 耿军; born 1976) is a Chinese independent filmmaker. He is known for several award-winning films, including The Hammer and Sickle Are Sleeping (2013), Free and Easy (2017), Manchurian Tiger (2021) and Bel Ami (2024).

== Career ==
Geng's films have been showcased at film festivals around the world. His feature directorial debut, Barbecue, was selected for the 2004 Nantes Three Continents Film Festival, as well as the 2005 International Film Festival Rotterdam. His 2009 film, Youth, was selected in the main competition at the 4th Rome Film Festival. His short film, The Hammer and Sickle Are Sleeping, won Best Short Film at the 51st Golden Horse Awards, and was featured at the 2016 Tromsø International Film Festival.

His follow-up film, Free and Easy, was selected for the World Cinema Dramatic Competition at the 2017 Sundance Film Festival. The film screened to positive notices, and won the Special Jury Award for Cinematic Vision. It went on to receive four nominations at the 54th Golden Horse Awards, including Best Director for Geng and Best Narrative Feature.

His 2021 film, Manchurian Tiger, won the Golden Goblet Award for Best Feature Film at the 24th Shanghai International Film Festival. It also screened at the 26th Bucheon International Fantastic Film Festival, the 21st New York Asian Film Festival, the Udine Far East Film Festival, and Film Festival Cologne.

His 2024 film, Bel Ami, premiered at the 2024 Taipei Golden Horse Film Festival and received 8 nominations at the 61st Golden Horse Awards, including Best Director, Best Original Screenplay and Best Original Film Song for Geng. The film ultimately won three awards, alongside the out-of-competition Audience Choice Award.

== Filmography ==
=== As filmmaker ===
Year	Title	Credited as	
Year	Title	Director	Writer
2004	Barbecue	Yes	Yes
2009	Youth	Yes	Yes
2013	The Hammer and Sickle Are Sleeping (Note: Short film)	Yes	Yes
2016	Free and Easy	Yes	Yes
2021	Manchurian Tiger	Yes	Yes
2024	Bel Ami	Yes	Yes

=== As actor ===
Year	Title	Role	Director
2021	Ripples of Life	Wang Shunfa	Wei Shujun
2022	Love Can't Be Said	Tong's father	Chia-Kai Wu

== Awards and nominations ==
Award	Year	Category	Nominated work	Result	Ref.
China Film Director's Guild Awards	2023	Screenwriter of the Year	Manchurian Tiger	Won	
Five Flavours Film Festival	2017	New Asian Cinema – Grand Prix	Free and Easy	Won	
Golden Horse Awards	2014	Best Short Film	The Hammer and Sickle Are Sleeping	Won	
Golden Horse Awards	2017	Best Director	Free and Easy	Nominated	
Golden Horse Awards	2024	Best Director	Bel Ami	Nominated	
Golden Horse Awards	2024	Best Original Screenplay	Bel Ami	Nominated	
Golden Horse Awards	2024	Best Original Film Song	Bel Ami	Nominated	
Golden Horse Awards	2024	Audience Choice Award	Bel Ami	Won	
Luxembourg City Film Festival	2018	Grand Prix	Free and Easy	Nominated	
Odesa International Film Festival	2017	Special Jury Mention	Free and Easy	Won	
Rome Film Festival	2009	Golden Marc'Aurelio Award	Youth	Nominated	
Shanghai International Film Festival	2021	Golden Goblet Award for Best Feature Film	Manchurian Tiger	Won	
Sundance Film Festival	2017	World Cinema Grand Jury Prize: Dramatic	Free and Easy	Nominated	
Sundance Film Festival	2017	World Cinema Dramatic Special Jury Award for Cinematic Vision	Free and Easy	Won	
