= The Good Postman =

- Official Poster
- Directed by: Tonislav Hristov
- Screenplay by: Tonislav Hristov; Lubomir Tsvetkov
- Produced by: Kaarle Aho; Kai Nordberg
- Starring: Ivan Fransuzov; Angela Jekova; Vangel Jekov; Ivan Halahcev; Veselina Dimova
- Cinematography: Orlin Ruevski
- Edited by: Nikolai Hartmann; Tonislav Hristov
- Music by: Petar Dundakov
- Production companies: Making Movies Oy; Soul Food
- Release date: 19 November 2016 (International Documentary Festival Amsterdam)
- Running time: 80 minutes
- Countries: Finland; Bulgaria
- Language: Bulgarian

The Good Postman is a 2016 documentary film directed by Tonislav Hristov. The film offers a tragicomic perspective on the 'refugee crisis' of 2015 from a small Bulgarian village located near the Turkish border. The village has suffered decades of economic and demographic decline. The handful of remaining residents observe refugee families from Syria and elsewhere as they cross the border, and ponder inviting them to settle in the vacant village houses. This proposal, advocated by the village postman and main protagonist Ivan, polarizes opinions and brings into focus the local people's own fears, hopes and disappointments.

Although the film uses a semi-fictionalised plot, all characters portray themselves in a narrative which closely follows real events which unfolded in Bulgaria during 2014 and 2015.

The film was largely positively received by international critics. An exception was a review by Neil Young of The Hollywood Reporter, who found the film to be "conventional in form and intermittently engaging in content." By contrast, Ștefan Dobroiu of Cineuropa called it "an amazing and complex portrait of life, politics and community."

The film premiered in November 2016 at the Amsterdam International Documentary Film Festival. The Good Postman was also the opening film at the April 2017 edition of the One World Human Rights Film Festival, held in Brussels.
