= Migrant caregivers in Taiwan =

Foreign domestic workers in Taiwan

Taiwan, with a population of 23.58 million as of 2022, is home to around 750,000 foreign workers, commonly known as "外勞" or "wailao". Among them, around 230,000 are care workers, mainly from Southeast Asia. They represent 2% of the total workforce in Taiwan.

== History ==

In 1992 the Employment Service Act was passed which widened the spectrum of jobs and industries which migrant workers could work in, including the domestic and facilitated care sector. These foreigners mostly consisted of Indonesian, Malaysian, Filipino, Thai, Vietnamese, and Mongolian workers. Most of these workers worked in "3D (dirty, dangerous, and difficult)" jobs and their legal standing as well as protection was very insufficient. At the same time, the foreign live-in caregiver program was established in 1992 to meet the growing demand for live-in domestic services in Taiwan. Between 2004 and 2010, the number of workers in this program saw a significant increase of 42%. On June 14, 1995, nursing institutions accommodating patients with chronic diseases were allowed to apply for and hire foreign nurses. Following that, foreign housemaids and guardians were included in the Labour Standard Act in 1998, however, they were again excluded from it in 1999. In 2010, the Council of Labour Affairs (CLA) created the work categorization 'social welfare foreign workers,' and their total count was 186,108. This group further breaks down into 'nursing home care-workers' in institutions, 'domestic caretakers' providing elderly care in private homes, and 'domestic helpers' handling childcare and household chores. In 2010, a large majority (93.7%) of these social welfare foreign workers worked in private homes, mainly caring for dependent elders. While there were changes in the ratio of foreign caregivers in the early 2000s, since 2006, the number of Indonesians among them has consistently risen.

Over the last decades multiple entry bans for migrant domestic workers have been enforced in Taiwan, notably the Overseas Filipino Worker entry ban in 2000, the Indonesian migrant workers entry ban from 2002 to 2004 and the Vietnamese workers entry ban from 2005 to 2015. The goal of these bans was to prevent and reduce the numbers of illegal migrants who leave their job without permission but continue their stay on the island.

Until 2015, migrant domestic workers were obligated to submit pregnancy clearance as part of their regular health examination, thus having their reproductive life being watched by the Taiwanese government.

== Social and cultural context ==
In Taiwan, it is a long-standing custom for children, especially sons to take care of their parents, due to the influence of Confucian tradition and the value it places on filial piety. When a man marries, his wife is responsible for taking care of his parents. If the son fails to fulfill this role, the daughter will take over the role. There is a kind of moral contract between parents and children for such care. Therefore, the situation varies slightly from family to family, in Taiwan, the family is primarily responsible for caring for the elderly.

Because of this cultural context, the government’s financial support for care services has also been minimal. Since the mid-1960s, rapid industrialization and urbanization have forced children to live apart from their parents, and in Taiwan, the number of large families has gradually declined, with adult children less likely to live with their parents. Nevertheless, as of 2009, about 20 percent of senior citizens aged 65 and over lived with their spouse, with less than 3 percent living in nursing homes. Furthermore, according to a survey in 2013, more than 65 percent of elderly respondents preferred to live with their children, and less than 2 percent said facility care was ideal. Thus, home care work remains in demand.

The Taiwanese government established an alternative elder care agreement (AECA) in the early 2000s. It mainly focuses on providing financial support for temporary care through local public health facilities. There are not many families that take advantage of these policies, and the facilities are not suitable for the elderly who have chronic diseases or permanent disabilities and need continuous and extensive management. Therefore, the importance and demand for home care services for the elderly are increasing.

== Demographics ==
Foreign Workers in Taiwan in Total and Foreign Social Welfare Workers
Year	Foreign Workers in Total	Foreign Social Welfare Workers
2008	365,060	168,427
2009	351,016	174,943
2010	379,653	186,108
2011	425,660	197,854
2012	445,579	202,694
2013	489,134	210,215
2014	551,596	220,011
2015	597,940	224,356
2016	624,768	237,291
2017	676,142	250,157
2018	706,850	258,097
2019	718,058	261,457
2020	709,123	251,856
2021	669,992	226,888
2022	728,081	221,858

In October 2023, 232,996 migrant workers in Taiwan were social welfare workers which is about 31% of all the migrant workers in Taiwan in total. The overwhelming majority of foreign domestic workers in Taiwan are female.

Between 2004 and 2019, the proportions of workers by nationality changed significantly. In 2004, Indonesians made up 16.4% of Social welfare foreign workers, while Vietnamese accounted for 54.8%. In 2019, Indonesians made up 77.1% of Social welfare foreign workers, while Vietnamese accounted for 10.9%. In addition, Filipinos accounted for 26.3% of the total population in 2004, while in 2019 they decreased to 11.8%. Thais also accounted for a consistently low percentage, 2.5% in 2004 and 1.6% in 2019.

== Work and pay regulations ==
Article 52 of the Employment Service Act sets that foreign workers are allowed to work in Taiwan for a period of not more than 12 accumulated years. However, the dispositions for foreign family nursing workers are different. If they received professional training or self-study and have a permitted special performance as well as being in line with the qualification and provisions of the Department, they can submit an application form and divers documents for an extension of work limited to 14 years.

The minimum age of foreign workers in Taiwan is 16 years. In the case of foreign workers engaged in family nursing job and/or household services, they must be 20 years old.

While migrant factory and industrial workers are included in the Labour Standard Act, migrant domestic workers do not share the same rights which resulted in higher risks of labor exploitation, excessive overtime working due to lack of legitimate working hours regulations as well as falling short of the minimum wage.

The Ministry of Labor, on 17 January 2023, announced the results of a survey on the management and employment of migrant caregivers. The results have been based on 4,027 samples from household employers in July and August 2022. During the month of June 2022, caregivers received an average of NT$20,209. This includes an average regular salary of NT$17,563 and overtime of NT$2,182, an increase of NT$127 and NT$107 respectively over the previous year. 98% of the household employers paid their employees overtime for working extra hours. Even if, 82,4% of the employers do not prescribe how long their caregivers have to work each day, the survey reveals that they work an average of 10 hours a day.

Under Taiwanese law, business owners who employ foreigners must be responsible for their foreign residence. They must pay the management costs of migrant workers to Taiwanese government. If migrant workers violate related laws or leave the workplace, employers have to pay a lot. To hire migrant workers regardless of their business type, employers must pay the government an amount equivalent to two months' salary as an insurance bond. In addition, employers are required to pay monthly employment stabilization fees for the employment of migrant workers. However, if a migrant worker leaves their workplace, the employer must pay the employment stabilization fee until the migrant worker returns or the contract period with the migrant worker ends.

As of 15 October 2023 Ministry of Labor (Taiwan) eased the conditions of hiring overseas caregivers to make it easier for individuals in need to hire them. The changes mostly target the conditions that government had on assessing the individuals need of full-time care and whether they can hire foreign help. Before individuals wishing to hire a foreign caregiver had to be assessed by medical professionals to measure their functional independence. Functionality test was used as a way for Taiwanese government to decide whether individuals’ family can hire a foreign caregiver. Broadening the conditions makes it easier to households in need of caregivers to employ one from overseas.

Easing of the rules applies to the article 46 of the Employment Service Act. The law now states that certain individuals, for example individuals who have employed long-term care services for at least six consecutive months or individuals with dementia, mobility impairment, rare disease, loss of swallowing function or who require respiratory support, will no longer have to undergo functionality assessment when looking to hire foreign caregiver.

== Issues and challenges ==
Migrant domestic workers have no right to naturalization and are therefore permanently temporary in Taiwan, which is justified by some politicians with ‘social problems’ that would occur when permanent labour migration is allowed. However, these 'social problems' were never clearly defined by officials and legislators except for the perceived problem of migrant women being in intimate relationships with local men. However, criticism has been recently raised that the policy restricts long-term migrant workers' right to settle.

Due to the business owners' responsibility to pay for the management of migrant workers, employers try to monitor and control migrant workers to prevent them from leaving their workplace. In particular, the monitoring of migrant workers who are employed at home will be more thorough, controlling not only their work but also their privacy. The problem is that Taiwan's Labor Standards Act does not cover workers who are employed at home. Employers sometimes seize passports or keep salaries to prevent migrant workers from leaving.

A survey from the Garden of Hope Foundation found that 38% of the migrants caregivers reported verbal abuse, physical injury, or sexual assault by their employers. However, only 46% of the workers reported the abuses or sought help. Reasons for not reporting include fear to losing their job, inability to speak Mandarin and not knowing where to go for help. In addition, 74.3% of caregivers declared not receiving any off work on weekends or holidays. A phone number has been set by the government to report abuses : the 1955. However, lot of migrant domestic workers do not call it as they are threatened by the employers to be sent back to their country.

In order to work in Taiwan, many workers call on the services of brokers. These services are expensive, costing between NT$ 1500 and NT$ 1700 a month. This a common practice, as Taiwan's government does not directly administer foreign labor programs. This practice keeps foreign workers in a state of poverty. Additionally, workers' countries of origin often charge fees and taxes on income earned in Taiwan. Migrants workers are also exploited by practises that been declared illegal by the Ministry of Labor, such as fees of NT$ 35 000 to NT$ 80 000 to change their employers or extend a contract.

== Governmental support ==
In Taiwan, administrative support for foreign workers is very extensive. The official websites of Taipei City, New Taipei City, Taoyuan City, Kaohsiung City, and other cities with large numbers of foreign workers provide a wide range of services, from hotlines with Indonesian and Vietnamese language services to free Chinese language classes, skill acquisition, recreational activities, learning advanced nursing care skills, medical examinations, awards for outstanding care workers and their employers, awards for poetry and literary works, and a consultation service for employers.

== Worker unions ==
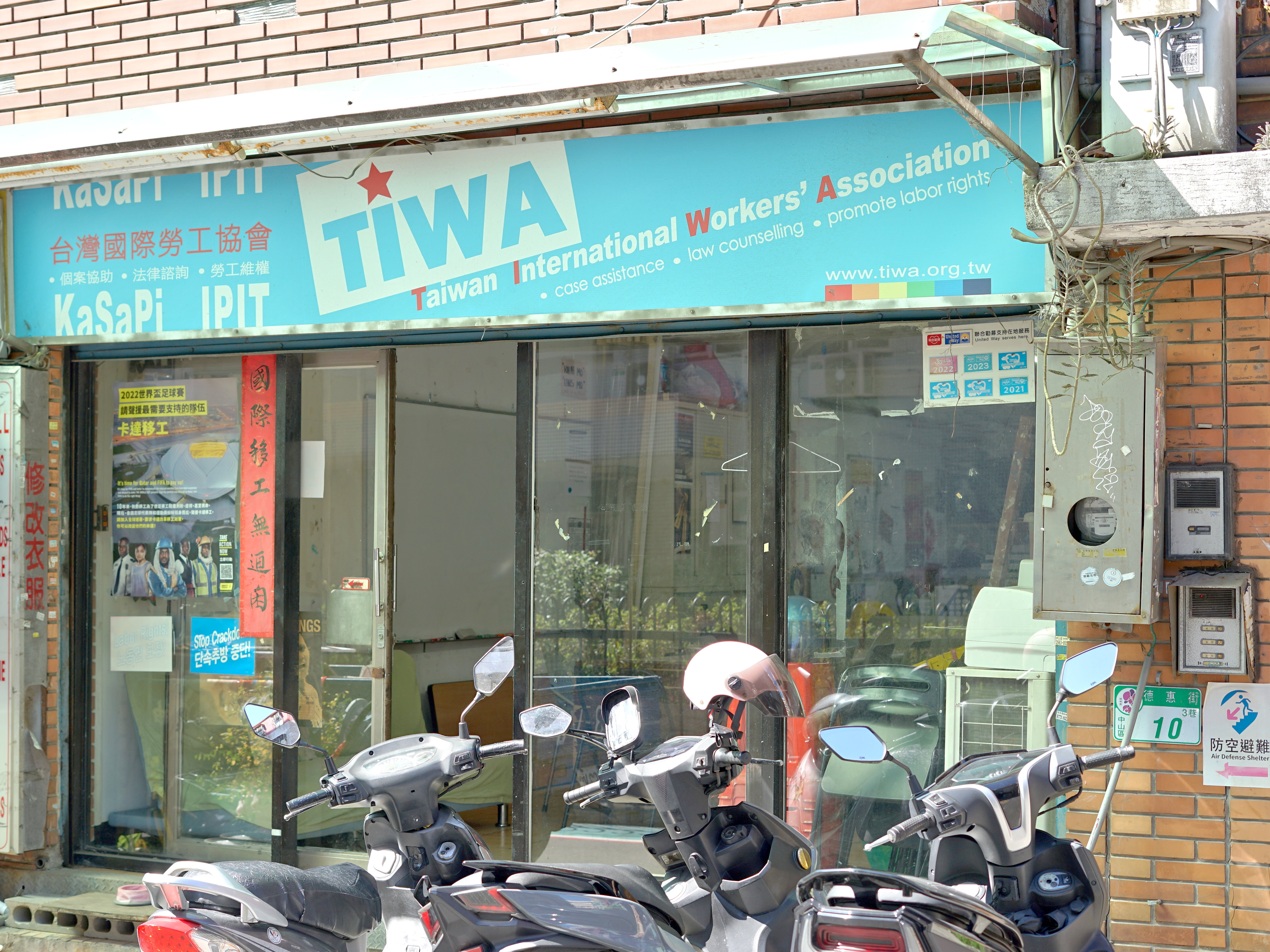

The most well-known worker unions in Taiwan who represent migrant domestic workers are the National Domestic Workers' Union and TIWA (Taiwan International Workers Association) created in October 1999. Associations and Organizations have also been created by the workers themselves such as KApulungan ng SAmahang PIlipino (KASAPI) and the Ikatan Pekerja Indonesia Taiwan (IPIT).

In 2003, some the associations taking care of migrant workers rights have been united into an bigger organization called " Promoting Alliance for the Household Service Act". In 2007, the union changed its name to "Migrant Empowerment Network in Taiwan".

Migrant workers also organized marches and protests in order to improve their condition. The latest, on December 10, 2023, asked for improving bilingual services for migrants and to get brokers out of the system.
