= Missing Johnny =

- Theatrical release poster
- Chinese: 強尼．凱克
- Literal meaning: Johnny. Caique
- Hanyu Pinyin: Qiáng ní. Kǎi kè
- Directed by: Huang Xi
- Written by: Huang Xi
- Produced by: Chang Chu-ti; Sam Yuan; Shaw Dong-xu; Kuo Chang-long
- Starring: Lawrence Ko; Rima Zeidan; Sean Huang
- Cinematography: Yao Hung-i
- Edited by: Huang Xi; Tsai Meng-hsin; Liao Ching-sung
- Music by: Lim Giong; Point Hsu
- Production company: 3H Productions
- Distributed by: Mirror Stage Films
- Release dates: 1 July 2017 (Taipei Film Festival); 15 December 2017 (Taiwan)
- Running time: 106 minutes
- Country: Taiwan
- Languages: Mandarin; English

Missing Johnny (Chinese: 強尼·凱克, romanized: Qiáng ní·kǎi kè, lit. 'Johnny Cake') is a 2017 Taiwanese drama film written and directed by Huang Xi. The film stars Lawrence Ko, Rima Zeidan and Sean Huang. Missing Johnny is Huang's debut feature. It is executive produced by Hou Hsiao-hsien.

== Premise ==
Hsu, a young woman who raises parrots and other feathered creatures in her apartment, keeps getting wrong phone calls for someone named Johnny. Lee, the autistic son of Hsu's landlady, seems to live in his own world. Chang is a shy handyman who feels disoriented whenever his beloved car breaks down. The lives of these three lonely individuals are drawn together when one of Hsu's parrots goes missing one day.

== Cast ==
- Lawrence Ko as Chang Yi-feng
- Rima Zeidan as Hsu Zi-qi
- Sean Huang as Lee Li
- Chang Kuo-chu as Chi-yuan
- Kay Huang as Mrs. Lee
- Duan Chun-hao as Hao
- Tang Zhi-ping as Zhi-wei
- Hsueh Ti-ying as Hsueh
- Pao Chen-fang
- Jack Kao

== Awards and nominations ==
| Award | Category | Recipients | Result | Ref. |
|---|---|---|---|---|
| 12th Chinese Young Generation; Film Forum Awards | Best New Actress | Rima Zeidan | Won | |
| 12th Chinese Young Generation; Film Forum Awards | Best New Producer | Chang Chu-ti | Won | |
| 54th Golden Horse Awards | Best New Director | Huang Xi | Nominated | |
| 54th Golden Horse Awards | Best New Performer | Rima Zeidan | Won | |
| 54th Golden Horse Awards | Best Original Film Score | Lim Giong and Point Hsu | Nominated | |
| 19th Taipei Film Awards | Best Screenplay | Huang Xi | Won | |
| 19th Taipei Film Awards | Best Supporting Actor | Sean Huang | Won | |
| 19th Taipei Film Awards | Best New Talent | Rima Zeidan | Won | |
| 19th Taipei Film Awards | Outstanding Artistic Contribution in Cinematography | Yao Hung-i | Won | |
