= South African History Archive =

Independent archive organisation in South Africa

South African History Archive SAHA
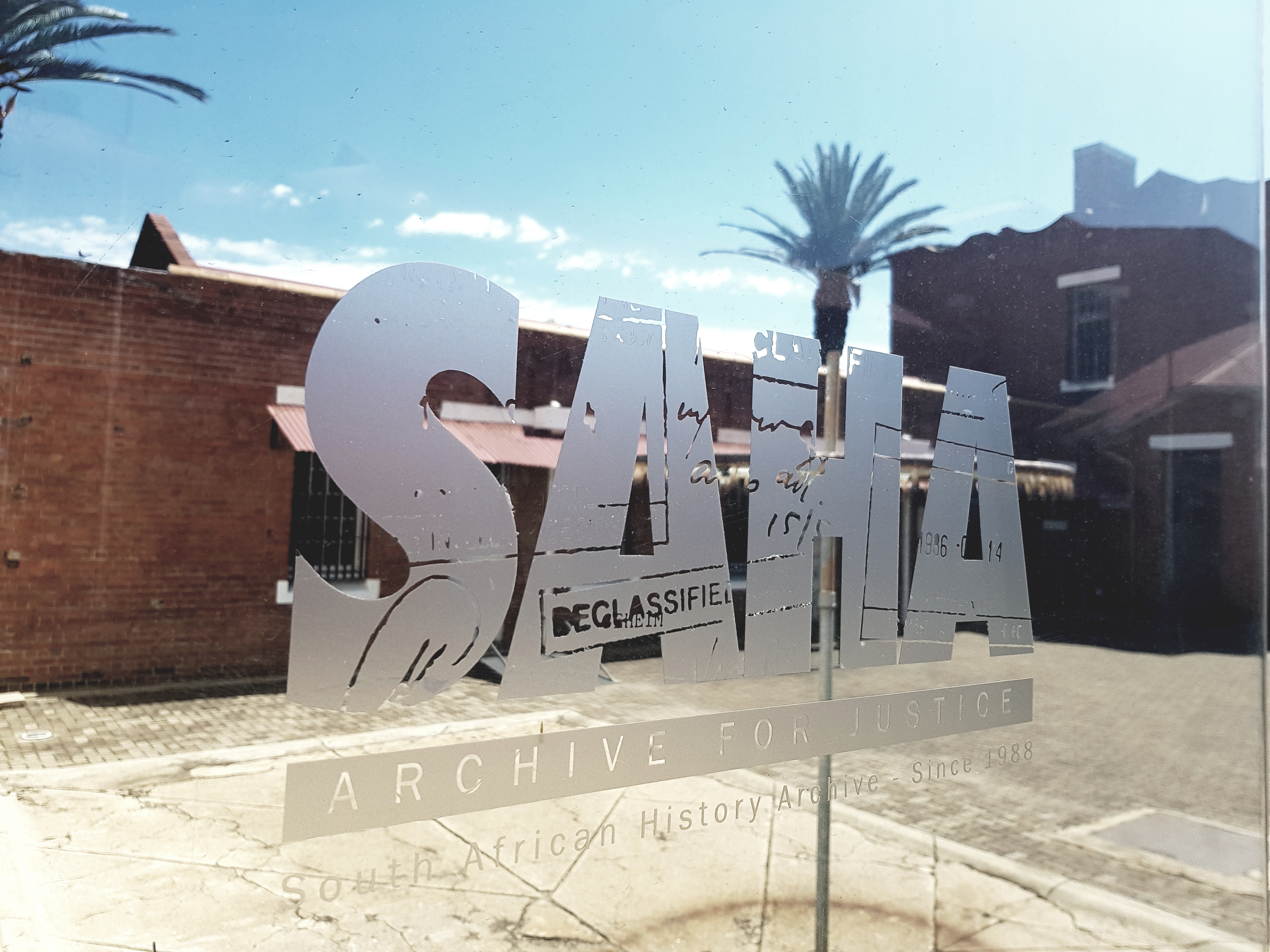
- Location: Wits History Workshop, Room 217, 2nd Floor, Robert Sobukwe Block., South Africa
- Type: Archive
- Scope: South African contemporary and apartheid struggle history
- Established: 1988

Collection
- Items collected: posters, photographs, legal documents, audio and visual recordings, other ephemera
- Size: over 800 linear meters

Access and use
- Access requirements: Open access by appointment

Other information
- Website: http://www.saha.org.za/

The South African History Archive Trust, better known as SAHA, is an independent archive dedicated to documenting, supporting and promoting greater awareness of past and contemporary struggles for justice through archival practice, outreach, and the utilisation of the Promotion of Access to Information Act, 2000 (PAIA). SAHA was founded in the 1980s as increasing state censorship in South Africa threatened to obscure the struggle against human rights violations and the oppressive political regime of apartheid. Since 2022, SAHA has been based at the Wits University after a 10-year relocation to Women's Gaol Museum, Constitution Hill where it took over responsibility for archiving the Constitution Hill Trust records in addition to its original collection.

== History ==
=== Origins ===
SAHA was founded in 1988 by representatives of the Mass Democratic Movement (MDM). The MDM was composed of a variety of anti-apartheid activist organisations including the United Democratic Front (UDF) and the Congress of South African Trade Unions (Cosatu). Organisations joining the MDM were dealing with a growing number of restrictions or had been banned by the National Party government. In a climate of censorship SAHA was formed by the MDM to keep the records of anti-apartheid organisations safe ensuring the struggles for liberation would be documented. In 1987 the Popular History Trust (PHT) in Harare, Zimbabwe, began collecting material from South African political organisations. A large quantity of the current SAHA collection was under threat resulting in it being sent to PHT to prevent its destruction by the apartheid state. PHT provided a safe location outside of South Africa where the future archival material of SAHA could be protected while remaining accessible. In the 1990s the bans on many political parties and activists were lifted making it possible for the archive to return to its country of origin. PHT dissolved as an independent organisation in Harare. At the legal forming of SAHA in 1991 PHT resources and the collections were transferred to SAHA.

=== 1990–2022 ===
During the 1990s and up until 2012, SAHA was based at the University of the Witwatersrand (Wits) in the William Cullen Library. While based at Wits, SAHA often worked with Historical Papers, sharing resources and undertaking joint projects such as the 1981 Detainees Oral History project and the Exiles Oral History Project.

During the 1980s SAHA's collection had been organised according to the needs of its founders and contributors, namely the administrative arms of political parties. Much of this bureaucratic method of organisation required re-evaluation. During the 1990s SAHA was primarily concerned with making the archive responsive to the growing number of post-apartheid researchers and with collecting documents in danger of destruction.

In 1997 SAHA created a core programme, originally called the Gay and Lesbian Archives (GALA) to help provide better access to the LGBTI records within SAHA and to assist in the organisation thereof. GALA became an independent organisation in 2007 changing its name to Gay and Lesbian Memory in Action while retaining the acronym GALA.

In 2002 SAHA started an intensive program of digitisation and organisation of the archive.

In 2012 SAHA left Wits and moved to Constitution Hill in the former Women's Jail.

In 2021 SAHA announced it would be returning to Wits University. The relocation was completed in 2022.

== Current ==
SAHA functions as a Trust and a nonprofit organization under the direction of a board of trustees.

SAHA mandate is to support struggles for justice by:

- Recording aspects of South African democracy in the making.
- Recovering lost and neglected histories.
- Bringing history out of the archives and into schools, universities and communities in new and innovative ways.
- Extending the boundaries of freedom of information in South Africa.
- Raising awareness, both nationally and internationally, of the role of archives and documentation play in promoting and defending human rights.

== Core programmes ==
SAHA organises its activities around two core programmes: the Struggle for Justice Programme (SFJP), and the Freedom of Information Programme (FOIP).

=== Struggle for Justice Programme (SFJP) ===
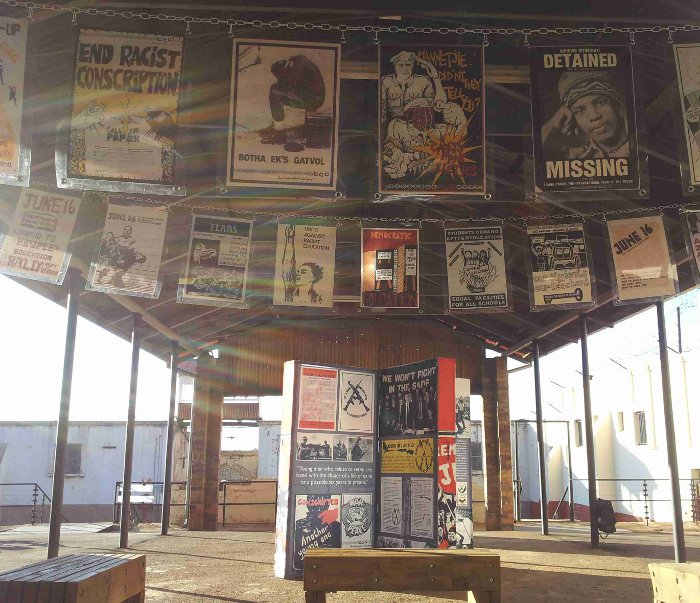
South African History Archive exhibition kit produced under SFJP

SFJP represents the original intentions of the archive at its founding in 1988. It is dedicated to preserving, creating access to, and collecting records that document struggles against the injustices of apartheid as well as contemporary struggles for social justice. In addition to fulfilling an archival role, SFJP also seeks to activate the archive. Activating the archive is a process of continually seeking to make the archive relevant to current researchers and promote its accessibility to the general public. SFJP activates the archive through publications, educational guidebooks for schools and teacher workshops, as well as through physical, traveling and online exhibitions.

=== Freedom of Information Programme (FOIP) ===
FOIP was established in 2001 following the enactment of the PAIA. PAIA has made it possible to access information held by the state or by private bodies, but in the latter case, only if needed to protect or exercise another right.

FOIP is dedicated to extending the boundaries of freedom of information in South Africa by creating awareness of the right of access to information and its power to assist in exercising and defending other human rights. FOIP provides advice and guidance to those wishing to make PAIA requests, runs workshops, and issues publications. As part of their programme, FOIP also empowers individuals and organisations to understand and utilise PAIA as a strategic advocacy tool. FOIP works to increase compliance with and the use of PAIA. Through the use of PAIA, FOIP has expanded the role of SAHA as an activist archive and helps to keep SAHA's collections relevant and responsive to researcher and community needs.

== Notable projects ==
=== Right to Truth (RTT) ===
SAHA's Right to Truth project (RTT) is focused on making the work and records of the South African Truth and Reconciliation Commission (TRC) and other records of apartheid-era human rights abuses more readily accessible. Over the course of 2014 to 2015 FOIP, through a PAIA request, gained access to the closed section 29 hearing transcripts of the TRC; making these records part of SAHA's collection. RTT is responsible for consolidating the TRC section 29 records with related TRC material held at SAHA. RTT is working towards making the S29 TRC records accessible in an online searchable format. RTT also assists in making available the transcripts and testimonies of the TRC and jointly with the South African Broadcasting Corporation (SABC) makes available the documentary Special Report.

=== PAIA Request Tracker ===
The PAIA Request Tracker is an online information management tool, developed by SAHA, to track requests made by SAHA and its civil society partners under PAIA. The tracker streamlines the request process, making it easier for civil society organisations to submit requests. It includes mechanisms to create, send and track the progress of PAIA requests and all related communication with the public and private bodies responsible for processing those requests.

In addition the Request Tracker functions as a tool for monitoring public and private bodies' compliance with the act. The Request Tracker is an information management tool that enables the public to compare compliance by various public and private bodies against prescribed timelines and other obligations in PAIA.

=== Sunday Times Heritage Project ===
To mark its 100th year of publication in 2006, the Sunday Times embarked on a project to erect a trail of memorials across South Africa to commemorate some of the remarkable people and events that made history from 1906 to 2006. It set out to commemorate remarkable people and events selected from different arenas of South Africa's past; SAHA extended the project and made accessible a range of media, such as radio, DVD, the web, as well as an oral history and heritage project for schools. Subjects include but are not limited to Happyboy Mgxaji, Mohandas Gandhi, Duma Nokwe, Tsietsi Mashinini, Brenda Fassie, Bethuel Mokgosinyana and the Orlando Pirates, Lilian Ngoyi, John Vorster Square and death in detention, Isaac Wauchope and the sinking of the SS Mendi and the Purple March.

== Collections ==
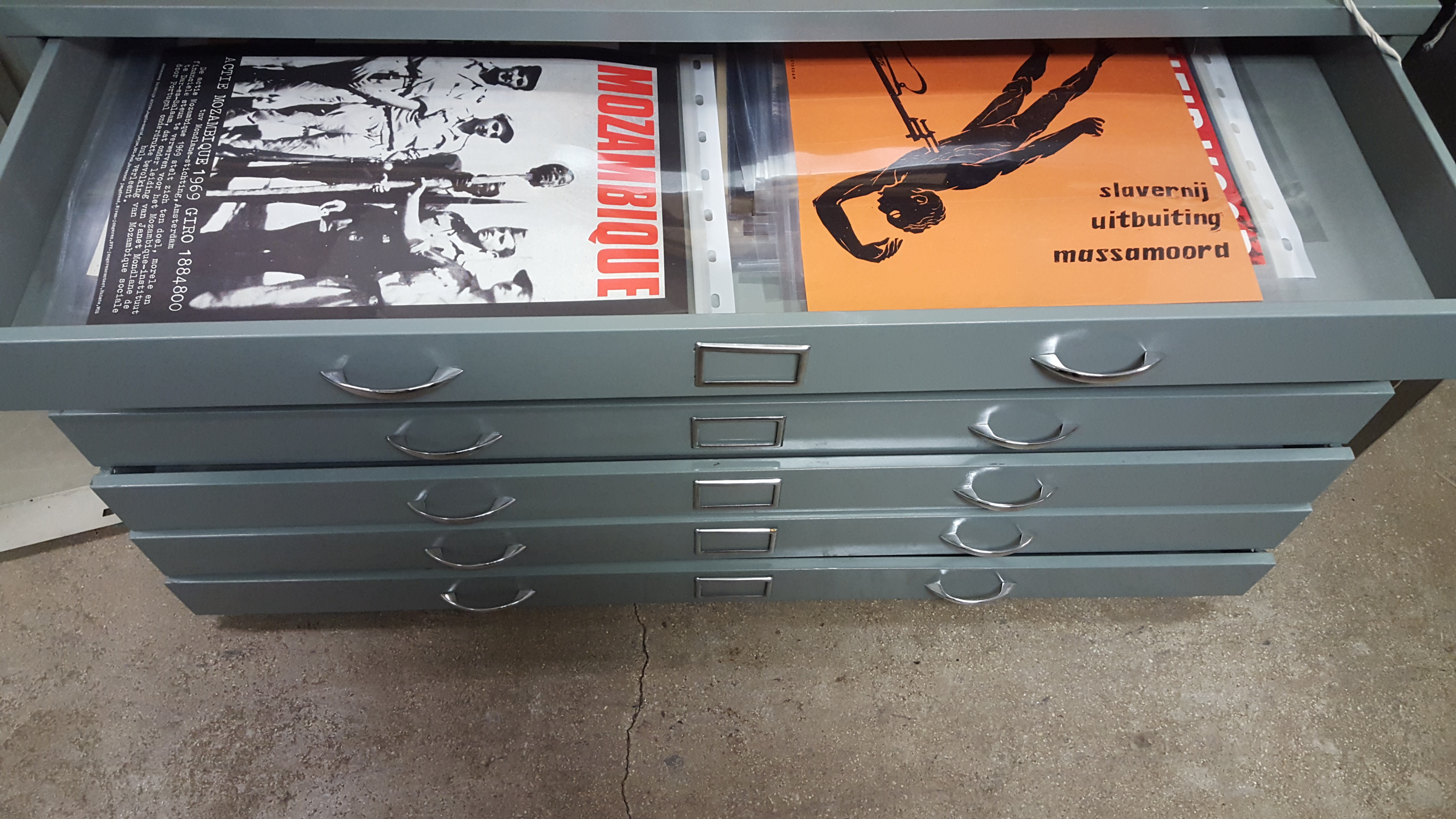
Inside SAHA

SAHA currently has over 140 collections. These include significant collections relating to the anti-apartheid struggle, the United Democratic Front (UDF) and the South African Truth and Reconciliation Commission (TRC). The collections consist of donated material from individuals and organisations, as well as materials created or collected in the course of SAHA's various oral history, education, heritage and outreach projects. FOIP is also contributing a fast growing body of information it has obtained by using PAIA. SAHA's collections consists of a variety of material including documents, posters, photographs, oral history recordings, music, and other ephemera.

== Exhibitions ==
=== Exhibition kits ===
In order to enable community-based and educational organisations to host low-cost exhibitions, in order to explore issues specific to their communities or to commemorate key moments in South African history, SAHA develops thematic exhibition kits for loan. These exhibition kits are suitable for use at short-term events (for example, conferences and civil society workshops), or for longer exhibitions at community halls and memorials sites. The kits currently relate to three themes: women, workers and youth.

== Publications ==
A list of SAHA publications

=== SFJP publications ===
- Women Hold Up Half the Sky (Exhibitions in the Classroom Booklet)
- Hlangnani Basebenzi – Commemorating South Africa's Labour Movement (Exhibitions in the Classroom Booklet)
- The Future Is Ours (Exhibitions in the Classroom Booklet)
- Between Life and Death: Stories from John Vorster Square
- The Battle Against Forgetting: Human Rights and the Unfinished Business of the TRC
- Forgotten' Voices in the Present
- Voices from Our Past
- Meeting History Face-To-Face: A Guide to Oral History
- Saha In the Classroom
- Entering Tembisa – Book and Cd
- Katorus Stories
- Mages of Defiance South African Resistance Posters of the 1980s
- Red on Black: The Story of The South African Poster Movement
- Transition's Child: The Anti-Privatisation Forum -
- History in The Making: Documents Reflecting a Changing South Africa
- Zapu Through Zenzo Nkobi's Lens
- The Unbreakable Thread – Non-Racialism in South Africa
- Guide to Archival Sources Relating to The South African Truth and Reconciliation Commission.
- Audiovisual Audit Report: The South African Liberation Struggle

=== FOIP publications ===
- Justice, Unfinished Business and Access to Information
- PAIA: Case Studies from Civil Society DVD
- PAIA Resource Kit
- PAIA Workshop Guide
- Paper Wars – Access to Information in South Africa
- Accessing Information for Better Basic Education
- Activating PAIA for Adcocacy
- PAIA Visual Framework Poster
- Accessing Information for Better Basic Education
- Accessing Information for Your Community
- Accessing Information in the LGBTI Sector
- Activating PAIA for Advocacy
- Using PAIA to Promote Housing Rights
- Accessing Information Using PAIA poster:
- PAIA poster – Structures of Government
- PAIA Unpacked: A Resource for Lawyers and Paralegals
- PAIA Visual Framework Poster
- PAIA: Case Studies from Civil Society DVD
- LGBTI and Access to Information in Africa
- The Translating PAIA Guide
- The Request Process Flowchart
- The Transparency and Local Government Guide
- The Proactively Ensuring Access Handout
- The Municipal Managers' Access to Information Sheet
- The Enabling Participation Through Access to Information Handout
