= Pascale Lamche =

French–South African filmmaker

- Born: Pascale Lamche
- Occupations: Director, producer, writer, editor
- Years active: 1997–present

Pascale Lamche (born July 1960), is a French–South African filmmaker. She is known as the director of several critically acclaimed film including Stalingrad, Black Diamond, Pakistan Zindabad, French Beauty, Accused #1: Nelson Mandela, Sophiatown and Winnie. Apart from filmmaking, she is also a producer, writer and cinematographer.

== Career ==
She obtained a first-class Honours B.A degree in Modern History from the University of Sussex and the Sorbonne. Then she started film career in London at the independent film center, Cinema Action, and worked for The European Script Fund in 1989. However, she later moved to Paris to establish ICONE, a venture for co-producing film and television. She had the chance to work in London and Paris as an independent producer and director. She accompany with production company Little Bird to make documentaries. Then she joined to 'La Cie Phares et Balises' and became the Director of International Co-Productions for Cameras Continentales.

Lamche made films with Alexander McQueen and for the Gucci group for produce several fashion advertisements. She also made feature documentaries and series both as a writer-producer and writer-director for many international broadcasters. She joined with many television serials as the producer for projects such as Bookmark, Great Performances, L'art et la manière. In 2003, she directed her maiden film Sophiatown, which gained critical acclaim.

In 2017, she made the documentary film Winnie, which deals with the life of Winnie Madikizela-Mandela and her struggle to bring down Apartheid in South Africa. The film was screened as a part of the Human Rights Festival 2019. In the same year, she won the award for the Best Director for International Documentary at Sundance Film Festival.

In April 2018, Lamche explained that former minister of safety and security Sydney Mufamadi has vindicated her during a media briefing.

== Filmography ==
Year	Film	Role	Genre	Ref.
1997	Bookmark	Producer	TV series	
1998	Undressed: Fashion in the Twentieth Century	Producer	TV movie documentary	
2001	Fashion Victim: The Killing of Gianni Versace	Producer	TV movie documentary	
2000	Waiting for Harvey: A Beginner's Guide to Cannes	Producer	Documentary	
2002	The King of Communism: The Pomp & Pageantry of Nicolae Ceausescu	Executive producer	TV movie documentary	
2002	Great Performances	Co-producer	TV series	
2003	Sophiatown	Director, producer, writer	Documentary	
2004	Accused #1: Nelson Mandela	Director	TV movie documentary	
2005	French Beauty	Director, writer, cinematographer	TV movie documentary	
2006	L'art et la manière	Director	TV series	
2007	Pakistan zindabad: Longue vie au Pakistan	Director	TV movie documentary	
2010	Black Diamond	Director	Documentary	
2015	Stalingrad: Plus un pas en arrière	Director	Documentary	
2017	Winnie	Director	Documentary	
