= Golden Horse Award for Best Live Action Short Film =

Taiwanese film award

- Awarded for: Best Live Action Short Film
- Country: Taiwan
- Presented by: Taipei Golden Horse Film Festival Executive Committee
- First award: 1996
- Currently held by: Pile On by Hu Lu (2025)
- Website: goldenhorse.org.tw

The Golden Horse Award for Best Live Action Short Film (Chinese: 金馬獎最佳劇情短片) is presented annually at Taiwan's Golden Horse Film Awards. The latest ceremony was held on November 22, 2025, with Hu Lu winning the award for Pile On.

== Winners and nominees ==
indicates the winner

Year	Recipient(s)	English title	Original title	Ref.
2025 (62nd)	Hu Lu	Pile On	疊羅漢	
2025 (62nd)	Lin Chih-wen	This Is NOT My Cow	這不是我的牛	
2025 (62nd)	Zhu Linwei	Green Lake	綠湖	
2025 (62nd)	Wang Pennram	Knee-Jerk	膝跳反應	
2025 (62nd)	Eve Liu	Nervous Energy	兩個女導演	
