= Ivan Linn =

Taiwanese-American entrepreneur, investor and music programmer

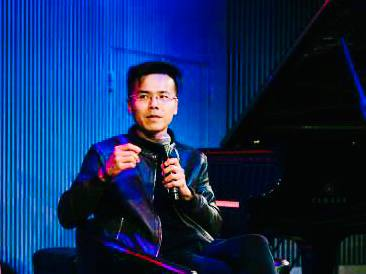
- Linn in 2022
- Education: Leibniz University Hannover; New England Conservatory of Music; Yale University
- Occupations: Entrepreneur; Composer; Pianist; Producer
- Known for: Final Fantasy, Assassin's Creed

Ivan Linn is a Taiwanese-American entrepreneur, investor, and music programmer. He is known for his work in the music production of video games in the Final Fantasy and Kingdom Hearts series. He is also appointed the music director and Chief Conductor of the Assassin's Creed Symphony World Tour. Linn is the founder of open source AI music platform Wavv. Linn is a member of the National Arts and Sciences Recording Academy and ASCAP.

== Early life and education ==
Linn started his acting career at four years old, with roles in the popular dramas Justice Pao and the TV show Dream of the Red Chamber. He was also featured in different TV advertisements for companies like McDonald's and Hunya Foods.

Linn was first exposed to music at the age of four, and made his first public piano performance in Switzerland when he was in kindergarten. However, he only started studying piano formally at the age of twelve at Yamaha Music Foundation.

Linn moved to Germany and went to the Hanover University of Music, Drama and Media, where he earned a bachelor's degree. In 2011, he moved to the United States to pursue a master's degree in piano performance at the New England Conservatory of Music with a full scholarship. Linn graduated from Yale University in 2015 with a artist diploma (A.D.).

== Career ==
=== Early career ===
In 2011, Linn managed the Video Game Orchestra, a philharmonic of symphonic rock fusion based in Boston, MA. The group brought a brand-new music genre to theater and concert hall. He later introduced the orchestra in Asia in 2012 and toured with the group. He was with the Video Game Orchestra for four years.

Linn received a gold medal at the International Edvard Grieg Piano Competition in Oslo and was invited by UNESCO to be featured at the Festival international de la diversité culturelle in Paris as a concert pianist.

He performed with composer Yoko Shimomura, and recorded as a pianist and production manager for Lightning Returns: Final Fantasy XIII and Final Fantasy XV. Linn toured with The Legend of Zelda: Symphony of the Goddesses, Eorzean Symphony Final Fantasy XIV, and Kingdom Hearts World Tour.

=== Recent projects ===
Linn is the Founder and CEO of Wavv, an open source musicAI platform founded in 2022.

Linn was appointed as the music director and Chief Conductor for Ubisoft's Assassin's Creed Symphony World Tour at the end of 2018. Assassin's Creed Symphony premiered with a live performance at E3 2019 that garnered millions of viewers.

In June 2020, Linn recorded live covers for Yoko Shimomura's "Stay at home" virtual concert series. He also produced Shimomura's music for the video game Xuan-Yuan Sword 7 released on October 6, 2020.

Linn composed the score for the Netflix TV series Futmalls.com, released in December 2020.

In 2021, Linn was the General Manager of Star Ritz International Entertainment Co., Ltd., which was founded by Angie Chai, dubbed the "Godmother of Teen Dramas."

In September 2022, Linn became an advisor of Filoli, which is also known as the Bourn-Roth Estate, a historic house and garden museum set in 16 acres of formal gardens surrounded by a 654-acre estate, located in Woodside, California.

== Discography ==
=== Video games ===
Year	Title	Developer	Role
2014	Lightning Returns: Final Fantasy XIII	Square Enix	Solo pianist/Production manager
2014	Kingdom Hearts HD 2.5 Remix	Square Enix	Production manager
2014	D4: Dark Dreams Don't Die	Access Games	Solo pianist
2015	Cytus	Rayark	Production manager
2016	Final Fantasy XV	Square Enix	Solo pianist/Production manager
2017	Xenoblade Chronicles 2	Monolith Soft	Solo pianist
2020	Xuan-Yuan Sword 7	Softstar Entertainment Inc.	Music Producer for Promotional Video

=== Film ===
Year	Title	Role
2015	Lazer Team	Production manager
2016	The Tenants Downstairs	Composer and producer
2018	Father to Son	Producer

=== TV ===
Year	Title	Role
2016	Ice Fantasy	Production manager
2020	Futmalls.com	Composer

=== Other projects ===
Year	Title	Role
2013	Live at Symphony Hall, Video Game Orchestra album.	Solo pianist
2013	World 1-2, Brave Wave Productions album.	Solo pianist
2016	Flow, Winne Hsin album.	Producer

== Tours ==
Year	Title	Role
2010	World tour as part of the Edvard Grieg competition prize	Solo Pianist
2015	Legend of Zelda Tour: Zelda Symphony of the Goddesses	Concert Pianist/Production Manager
2016	Capcom Live!	Concert Pianist/Production Manager
2017-2018	Kingdom Hearts World Tour	Concert Pianist
2018	Eorzean Symphony: Final Fantasy XIV	Concert Pianist
2019	Assassin’s Creed Symphony World Tour	Music Director/Conductor

== Awards and honours ==
Year	Title	Notes
2000	Xingtian Temple Tomorrow Star Piano Competition.	First prize
2002	Ministry of Culture of Taiwan's Talent Bank	Winner
2003	Città di Barletta Piano Competition	First prize
2004	SinoPac Philharmonic Classical Elite Award	First prize and Most Promising Newcomer
2006	Sounds of the Human World, Master Hsing Yun Buddhist Music Competition	First prize and Audience Award.
2007	NTSO Piano Concerto Competition	Third prize
2007	Ministry of Culture of Taiwan's Talent Bank	Winner
2008	Chimei Arts Award	Winner
2010	International Edvard Grieg Piano Competition	First prize and Romantic Composer.
2010	New Taipei City Government's "New Taipei City Light" Medal	Winner
2011	Sicily IBLA Music Award	Winner
2011	Taiwan's Ministry of Culture Award	Winner
2012	iChoice	Named Artistic Ambassador
2013	Fischoff Chamber Music Competition	Bronze Medal
2013	Chimei Arts Award	Winner
2014	Tanglewood Music Center Fellowship	Winner
2015	Steinway	Young Artist
2017	Questrom School of Business Zulalian Award	Winner
2017	28th Golden Melody Award for Best Instrumental Recording Album	Ice Fantasy score nominated
2018	Richmond Competition	First prize
2018	55th Golden Horse Award for Best Original Film Score	Father to Son score nominated
