= Trade War (disambiguation) =

Trade war is the practice of nations creating mutual tariffs or similar barriers to trade.

Trade War(s) may also refer to:

- Trade War, 2024 Taiwanese television series starring Fu Meng-po, Ivy Shao, Lego Lee and Hayato Ichihara
- Trade Wars, a series of video games dating back to 1984
