= An Elephant Sitting Still =

2018 Chinese film by Hu Bo

- Theatrical release poster

Chinese name
- Chinese: 大象席地而坐
- Literal meaning: an elephant sitting on the ground
Transcriptions
Standard Mandarin
- Hanyu Pinyin: Dàxiàng Xídì Erzuò
- Directed by: Hu Bo
- Screenplay by: Hu Bo
- Based on: An Elephant Sitting Still by Hu Bo
- Produced by: Fu Dongyan
- Starring: Peng Yuchang; Wang Yuwen; Zhang Yu; Liu Congxi
- Cinematography: Fan Chao
- Edited by: Hu Bo
- Music by: Hua Lun
- Production company: Dongchun Films
- Distributed by: KimStim (United States)
- Release date: February 16, 2018 (Berlinale)
- Running time: 234 minutes
- Country: China
- Language: Mandarin
- Box office: $32,556

An Elephant Sitting Still (Chinese: 大象席地而坐; pinyin: Dà Xiàng Xídì Érzuò) is a 2018 Chinese drama film written, directed and edited by Hu Bo. The first and only feature film by the novelist-turned-director Hu, who died by suicide soon after finishing his film on 12 October 2017 at the age of 29, it is based on a story with the same title from his 2017 novel Huge Crack, about four people who travel to a northern Chinese city to see the eponymous elephant. It made its world premiere in the Forum section of the 68th Berlin International Film Festival. The film has won acclaim from established directors such as Béla Tarr, Wang Bing, Ang Lee, and Gus Van Sant.

The film opened the 12th FIRST International Film Festival in Xining in late July 2018. It was released in the United Kingdom on December 14, 2018, and in the United States on March 8, 2019. The film received critical acclaim.

== Plot ==
In Shijiazhuang, gang member Yu Cheng tells a woman in bed with him of a sitting elephant in a circus in Manzhouli. Whether it is fed or provoked, it remains still. The woman's husband, one of his friends, comes home to discover Yu Cheng, and commits suicide by jumping out the window.

An old man named Wang Jin, who lives with his granddaughter, son-in-law, and daughter, is asked to move out of the apartment (which he owns) into a nursing home as raising the granddaughter has become too expensive.

A student named Wei Bu wakes up to his abusive father yelling about his filthy room. Wei meets his friend Li Kai and they worry about the school bully, Yu Shuai, who is the younger brother of Yu Cheng. Yu Shuai has accused Li Kai of stealing his cell phone. Li has stolen his father's pistol for protection.

Huang Ling, Wei's classmate, complains about a leaking toilet to her mother, with whom she has a difficult relationship.

Wei sees the school's vice-dean, who tells him that the school will be closed down. The vice-dean plans to move to a better school while Wei and his classmates will be relocated to an even worse one. Later, Wei and Li meet with Yu Shuai, who mocks Wei's father for having lost his job for accepting a bribe. Wei shoves Yu Shuai down a flight of stairs and Yu Shuai is critically injured.

When Wang encounters a lost dog, it fatally mauls his own dog. Wang tracks down the couple who own the dog, only for the man to aggressively deny the attack and refuse to pay for any bills.

Wei visits his grandmother and discovers she has died. He picks up his pool cue from a pool hall to sell. As Wang disposes of his dog's body, Wei sees him and asks him for money with the cue as collateral. The two are confronted by the owner of the lost dog who believes Wang has killed it. When Wei threatens him, he is kicked repeatedly. Wang returns to his apartment building, encountering Yu Cheng and his gang who recognize the cue and corner him. Wang escapes and beats up the goons.

Wei meets Huang and he tells her of his plans to leave for Manzhouli. He invites her to join, but she mocks him and says he is only good at kicking a jianzi shuttlecock. Wei follows Huang to a bakery where she meets with the dean secretly. Yu Cheng, not recognizing Wei, also happens to be there and tells him that he is looking for who hurt his brother. Inside the bakery, the dean tells Huang of a boy he knew who beat a cat to death with stones.

Wei meets his friend Li at a mall. Li admits he did steal Yu Shuai’s phone, as it contained a video of him urinating and one of the dean with Huang. Later, Huang discovers a video of herself and the dean together has been leaked online. Wei tries to visit Yu Shuai at the hospital. He witnesses Yu Shuai's mother shouting at and slapping Yu Cheng. Wei steals a shuttlecock from a group of elderly men, walks to a riverbank, and screams in self-disgust.

Yu Cheng speaks to his girlfriend and blames her for his friend’s suicide. He says his life is like a dumpster in which garbage keeps piling up.

Huang argues with her mom about her affair with the dean. During this, the dean and his wife show up. Huang’s mother tells them Huang is not at home, while Huang leaves through her room's window. Huang picks up a baseball bat and beats both the dean and his wife.

Wei, attempting to go to Manzhouli, purchases train tickets from a scalper. Realizing he has been scammed, he demands a refund. Wei is beaten by the scalper and his associates who later recognize him as the kid who hurt Yu Shuai and call Yu Cheng. Though Yu Cheng’s brother has since died, when he learns that Wei also wants to see the elephant, he orders his gang members to get Wei a ticket.

Li appears with his gun and shoots Yu Cheng. Li claims he is proud of himself and tells Wei that he did not post the video of Huang. Wei, disgusted, leaves. Li then shoots himself.

Wei meets Wang at the train station, who decides to take his granddaughter to see the elephant, and Huang, who also wants to leave. Huang discovers that their tickets have been canceled and they take a bus instead.

In the dark, they exit a bus near Manzhouli and kick a shuttlecock by the side of the road. The roar of an elephant is heard.

== Cast ==
- Peng Yuchang as Wei Bu
- Wang Yuwen as Huang Ling
- Zhang Yu as Yu Cheng
- Liu Congxi as Wang Jin
- Xiang Rongdong as Deputy dean
- Jing Guo as Deputy dean's wife
- Guozhang Zhaoyan as Wei Bu's father
- Li Suyun as Wei Bu's mother
- Kong Wei as Wang Jin's son-in-law
- Li Danyi as Wang Jin's daughter
- Kong Yixin as Wang Jin's granddaughter
- Ling Zhenghui as Li Kai
- Zhang Xiaolong as Yu Shuai
- Wang Ning as Huang Ling's mother

== Production ==
=== Filming ===
The film is set in the northern Chinese industrial city of Shijiazhuang in the Hebei province. Filming occurred in Shijiazhuang over the course of twenty-five days in March and April 2017. Fan Chao, the film's cinematographer, shot with a handheld camera and frequently used tracking shots. This was a result of low budget: Hu originally intended to film statically and with wide angles, but it was too expensive.

Hu Bo wrote, directed, and edited the film himself. Production began in 2016 when he took his screenplay to FIRST Film Festival in Xining for financing. The screenplay was noticed by producer Liu Xuan, who then took it to her husband Wang Xiaoshuai. He ended up producing the film. Reportedly, Hu struggled at this time with maintaining creative control over the project, as well as making enough money from it to be able to live. He described the experience as "humiliation, despair and powerlessness" online, and was berated by Wang who also posted that the film was a "mess." His relationship began deteriorating with Wang because of this.

The final straw came when Wang attempted to convince Hu to cut his film down from 230 minutes to 120 minutes. Those close to Hu reported that this pressure was a major reason Hu committed suicide after production of the film was over. Wang Xiaoshuai's name was scrubbed from the press kit credits, but his production company remained attached.

=== Distribution ===
The film was first screened on 16 February 2018 at the 68th Berlin International Film Festival in the Forum section. He was one of three young Chinese directors that were able to make it in thanks to their higher-profile Chinese producers, part of a growing trend in representation for independent films at Berlinale. In light of Hu's suicide, the Q&A section of the premiere was replaced by speeches from Hu's mother and his film school teacher Wang Hongwei. The 230 minute cut was chosen for this release and the subsequent ones worldwide. The film was then shown at the 42nd Hong Kong International Film Festival, where it won the Audience Choice Award. It ran through festivals until widely released in the United Kingdom on 14 December 2018 and in the United States on 8 March 2019.

On 18 November 2019, the film received its streaming premiere on the Criterion Channel. On 10 December 2019, the film released on Blu-ray.

== Reception ==
=== Critical reception ===
An emotional Béla Tarr, when presenting the film to an international audience, said that he felt he had done too little to prevent the suicide of his protégé, that the great film will be remembered forever, and that people should look after individuals like Hu. An Elephant Sitting Still was acclaimed by critics. On Rotten Tomatoes, the film has an approval rating of 94%, with an average rating of 8.40/10, based on 52 critics, the critic consensus says "A remarkable debut that sadly serves as its creator's epitaph, An Elephant Sitting Still offers an uncompromisingly grim yet poignant portrait of life in modern China." On Metacritic, the film has a score (using a weighted average) of 86 out of 100, indicating "universal acclaim". Justin Chang of the Los Angeles Times wrote that although the film has "a soap opera season's worth of romantic indiscretions, sudden deaths, unfortunate accidents, provoked and unprovoked attacks", the story "somehow never loses its sense of balance and modulation." Chang argued that the work had a consoling insight that the characters are all worth knowing despite their flaws, and lauded it as "a triumph of bold sociopolitical critique and intimate human portraiture, and a reminder that you rarely encounter the one without the other."

David Ehrlich, who assigned the film an "A−" rating in IndieWire, argued that An Elephant Sitting Still "has little interest in the conventional drama of cause and effect, and its fractured structure is used to emphasize the distance between these people rather than the ties that bind them together." He characterized it as a searching film that avoids "[contriving] an empty solution for the demoralized". Justine Smith, who awarded the film 3.5/4 stars, praised the film's portrayal of love in a system of inequality and oppression. She argued that Hu simultaneously suggests that love in a devastated system "means tethering yourself to people who have long been broken by mistreatment and inequality and who no longer have the capacity to return it", but also that love and beauty are "a constant source of minute, if not fleeting, pleasure." Smith referred to this as a "realistic" portrayal of love in such a system and billed the film's ending as "one of the greatest in contemporary film history", though also referred to the film as "overwhelmingly grey".

In The New Yorker, Richard Brody lauded An Elephant Sitting Still as one of the greatest recent films, writing that Hu "builds an intricate grid of conflict-riddled connections among the movie's main characters" and that the "volatile, roving long takes pursue the characters to the deepest corners of their explosive despair". Brody argued that Hu's "vision conveys a mighty, universal human despair." Matthew Thrift of Little White Lies praised the film as "without question one of the strongest debuts in recent memory", arguing that "the remarkable surety of Hu's direction provides a restless momentum. It's a film constantly in motion, tracking cat and mouse alike through the city streets. [...] Conflict is born out of character and circumstance, rather than narrative contrivance or traditional dramatic structure."

=== Best lists ===
An Elephant Sitting Still has been ranked by numerous critics and publications as one of the best films of 2018/2019.

- 1st – Cinema Scope
- 2nd – Lawrence Garcia, The A.V. Club
- 3rd – K. Austin Collins, Vanity Fair
- 6th – Philip Concannon, Gay City News
- 6th – Jordan Cronk
- 9th – Nick Linden, The Hollywood Reporter
- 9th – David Hudson
- 9th – Hyperallergic
- Top 9 (unranked)– The Quietus
- 10th – Dennis Dermody, Paper
- Top 10 (unranked)– Sheila O'Mailey, RogerEbert.com
- 12th – Justin Chang, The Los Angeles Times
- 12th – Fernando F. Croce, CinePassion
- 13th – Slant
- 13th – Film Comment
- 13th – Charles Bramesco, The A.V. Club
- 14th – Nick Schager, Esquire
- Top 20 (outside top 10, 11-20 unranked)– Ed Gonzalez, Slant
- 24th – Michael Glover Smith, White City Cinema
- 25th – Slant
- Top 26 (outside top 10, 11-26 unranked)– A.O. Scott, The New York Times
- 32nd – Film Stage
- Top 46 (unranked)– Richard Brody, The New Yorker. Brody also ranked it as one of the 27 best movies of the 2010s.

== Awards and nominations ==
Year	Award	Category	Recipient	Result
2018	68th Berlin International Film Festival	FIPRESCI Award	An Elephant Sitting Still	Won
2018	68th Berlin International Film Festival	GWFF Best First Feature Award - Special Mention	An Elephant Sitting Still	Won
2018	42nd Hong Kong International Film Festival	Audience Choice Award	An Elephant Sitting Still	Won
2018	18th New Horizons Film Festival	Audience Award	An Elephant Sitting Still	Won
2018	55th Golden Horse Awards	Best Feature Film	An Elephant Sitting Still	Won
2018	55th Golden Horse Awards	Best Leading Actor	Peng Yuchang	Nominated
2018	55th Golden Horse Awards	Best New Director	Hu Bo	Nominated
2018	55th Golden Horse Awards	Best Adapted Screenplay	Hu Bo	Won
2018	55th Golden Horse Awards	Best Cinematography	Fan Chao	Nominated
2018	55th Golden Horse Awards	Best Original Film Score	Hua Lun	Nominated
2018	55th Golden Horse Awards	Audience Choice Award	An Elephant Sitting Still	Won
2019	37th International Film Festival of Uruguay	New Filmmakers Competition - Special Mention	An Elephant Sitting Still	Won
2019	12th CinemAsia Film Festival	Audience Award	An Elephant Sitting Still	Won
2020	39th Hong Kong Film Awards	Best Asian Chinese Language Film	An Elephant Sitting Still	Won
2020	MOOOV Film Festival	MO*award	An Elephant Sitting Still	Won
