= Dear Ex =

2018 film by Mag Hsu and Hsu Chih-yen

- Theatrical release poster
- Traditional Chinese: 誰先愛上他的
- Simplified Chinese: 谁先爱上他的
- Hanyu Pinyin: Shéi Xiān Ài Shàng Tā De
- Directed by: Mag Hsu; Hsu Chih-yen
- Screenplay by: Lu Shih-yuan; Mag Hsu
- Produced by: Lu Shih-yuan
- Starring: Roy Chiu; Hsieh Ying-xuan; Spark Chen; Joseph Huang
- Cinematography: Lin Chih-peng
- Edited by: Lei Chen-ching
- Music by: DJ Didilong
- Production companies: Dear Studio; Comic Communication Studio; Ocean Entertainment; Hervoice Concept
- Distributed by: Warner Bros. Pictures (Taiwan); Medialink Entertainment (International)
- Release dates: 22 April 2018 (FEFF); 2 November 2018 (Taiwan)
- Running time: 99 minutes
- Country: Taiwan
- Language: Mandarin
- Budget: NT$35 million
- Box office: NT$65 million

Dear Ex (Chinese: 誰先愛上他的; lit. 'Who Fell in Love with Him First?') is a 2018 Taiwanese drama film directed by Mag Hsu and Hsu Chih-yen, from a screenplay by Lu Shih-yuan and Mag Hsu. It stars Roy Chiu, Hsieh Ying-xuan, Spark Chen, and Joseph Huang. It follows a teenager becoming trapped in the middle of a bitter feud between his willful mother and a free-spirited man, who is both the lover and insurance beneficiary of his recently deceased father.

The film had its world premiere at the 20th Far East Film Festival on 22 April 2018, and was theatrically released in Taiwan on 2 November 2018, by Warner Bros. It received generally positive reviews from critics and was selected as the Taiwanese entry for the Best International Feature Film at the 92nd Academy Awards, but it was not nominated. At the 55th Golden Horse Awards, it earned eight nominations, including Best Feature Film and Best Leading Actor (for Chiu), and won in three categories: Best Leading Actress (for Hsieh), Best Original Film Song (for "Bali Song"), and Best Film Editing. The film also won Best Narrative Feature, Best Actor (for Chiu), Best Actress (for Hsieh), and the Press Award at the 20th Taipei Film Awards.

== Plot ==
When San-lian's ex-husband, Zheng-yuan, passes away, she discovers he has altered his insurance policy, cutting out their son in favour of his male lover, Jay. Outraged, San-lian and her son, Cheng-xi, arrive at Jay's apartment and demand that he return the money to her, but Jay refuses to oblige.

Cheng-xi does not get on very well with his mother and believes that she only cares about the insurance money. After his mother throws away his dad's memorabilia and they get into a heated argument, he runs away and moves into Jay's apartment, and Jay has to look after him. He follows Jay around during the day, and Jay begrudgingly shows him his work as a theatre director. It is revealed in flashbacks how Jay and San-lian's ex-husband, Zheng-yuan, became lovers when they worked together in the theatre, but Zheng-yuan ultimately decided to pursue a relationship with San-lian to have a family. However, after he became ill, he left his family and spent his remaining time living with Jay before he died.

San-lian continues to visit her son to get him to go back to her house. During one visit, she bumps into Jay's mother and finds out she does not know that he is gay. She attempts to blackmail Jay to give her the insurance money or else she will reveal the truth to his mother but this is not successful and she ultimately tells his mother anyway.

Jay is ambushed by a group of men, who break his leg. Cheng-xi and his mother help rush him to the hospital. It is revealed that Jay had previously borrowed money from loan sharks to get Zheng-yuan a liver transplant. Despite his injury, Jay goes back to his theatre to attend his opening act and San-lian and Cheng-xi watch Jay's play. After the performance, Jay's mother appears and presents Jay with flowers, having accepted her son, and they tearfully embrace. Later, San-lian allows Jay to keep the insurance money and Cheng-xi moves back in with his mother.

== Cast ==
- Roy Chiu as Jay
- Hsieh Ying-xuan as Liu San-lian
- Spark Chen as Song Zheng-yuan
- Joseph Huang as Song Cheng-xi
- Wanfang as Consultant
- Allen Kao as Jay's mother
- Yang Li-yin as San-lian's sister
- Liang Cheng-chun as Stage manager
- Wu Ting-chien as Director

In addition, Chung Hsin-ling, who was originally cast as San-lian's sister, made a voice cameo as a radio host.

== Production ==
Screenwriter Mag Hsu and music video director Hsu Chih-yen both made their respective feature directorial debuts on Dear Ex. The screenplay, written by Lu Shih-yuan and Mag Hsu, was based on the true story of a friend of Hsu's who found out that her husband was having an affair with a guy.

Mag Hsu said about the film in a 2019 interview: "I truly believe that Dear Ex is not only an LGBT film; it involves more, all kinds of communities, a range of perspectives. This is why I feel that this film doesn't need to be labeled an LGBT film."

== Release ==
Dear Ex had its world premiere at the 20th Far East Film Festival on 22 April 2018, where audiences praised its heartfelt storyline and snappy graphics. It was screened as the opening film of the 22nd Toronto Reel Asian International Film Festival on 8 November 2018, marking the first time the annual event has opened with a Taiwanese production. The film was released in Taiwan on 12 November 2018, and on Netflix worldwide on 1 February 2019.

== Reception ==
=== Critical response ===
On the review aggregator website Rotten Tomatoes, 90% of 10 critics' reviews are positive, with an average rating of 6.5/10.

Karen Han of The New York Times called Dear Ex "a remarkably affecting and cogent picture" and remarked, "At points, the film threatens to tip over into melodrama, but the directors Mag Hsu and Hsu Chih-yen always right the ship, balancing oversaturated flashbacks with a nuanced portrait of love that endures both trials and time." Andrew Lapin of NPR opined, "The film may pale in comparison to The Cakemaker, which told its story with more nuance and sensory detail. But Dear Ex's narrative hiccups and tonal missteps seem less blaring by the time it enters its affecting homestretch […]. Love in this movie is expressed in odd ways, but it is still genuine." Wendy Ide of Screen Daily wrote, "This comic melodrama wrings every last drop of drama from the set up" and "The music choices and the production design compete for knowing kitsch, but there is nothing ironic about the emotional impact of the third act." Joel Keller of Decider stated, "Dear Ex has good performances and a story that should be relatable to anyone who has gone through family problems as a kid." Stephen McCarty of the South China Morning Post commented, "Dear Ex proves to be a work of redemption, reconciliation and forgiveness […]. And at its heart, it's a love story: nothing odd about that."

=== Accolades ===
Award	Category	Recipients	Result
3rd International Film Festival & Awards Macao	Best Film	Dear Ex	Nominated
Mi Ying Spirit Movie Award	Best Film	Dear Ex	Nominated
20th Taipei Film Awards	Best Feature Film	Dear Ex	Won
20th Taipei Film Awards	Best Leading Actor	Roy Chiu	Won
20th Taipei Film Awards	Best Leading Actress	Hsieh Ying-xuan	Won
20th Taipei Film Awards	Press Award	Dear Ex	Won
55th Golden Horse Awards	Best Feature Film	Dear Ex	Nominated
55th Golden Horse Awards	Best Leading Actor	Roy Chiu	Nominated
55th Golden Horse Awards	Best Leading Actress	Hsieh Ying-xuan	Won
55th Golden Horse Awards	Best New Performer	Joseph Huang	Nominated
55th Golden Horse Awards	Best New Director	Mag Hsu and Hsu Chih-yen	Nominated
55th Golden Horse Awards	Best Original Screenplay	Lu Shih-yuan and Mag Hsu	Nominated
55th Golden Horse Awards	Best Original Film Song	Lee Ying-hung (Bali Song)	Won
55th Golden Horse Awards	Best Film Editing	Lei Cheng-ching	Won
10th To Ten Chinese Films Festival	Outstanding Film	Dear Ex	Won
10th To Ten Chinese Films Festival	Best Leading Actor	Roy Chiu	Nominated
10th To Ten Chinese Films Festival	Best Leading Actress	Hsieh Ying-xuan	Nominated
19th Chinese Film Media Awards	Best Leading Actor	Roy Chiu	Nominated
19th Chinese Film Media Awards	Best Leading Actress	Hsieh Ying-xuan	Nominated
19th Chinese Film Media Awards	Best New Director	Mag Hsu and Hsu Chih-yen	Nominated

== See also ==
- List of submissions to the 92nd Academy Awards for Best International Feature Film
- List of Taiwanese submissions for the Academy Award for Best International Feature Film
