= 55th Golden Horse Awards =

2018 Taiwanese film awards ceremony

- Poster
- Date: November 17, 2018; 17:00 NST (red carpet); 19:00 NST (awards ceremony)
- Site: Sun Yat-sen Memorial Hall, Taipei, Taiwan
- Hosted by: Matilda Tao
- Organized by: Taipei Golden Horse Film Festival Executive Committee

Highlights
- Best Feature Film: An Elephant Sitting Still
- Best Director: Zhang Yimou; Shadow
- Best Actor: Xu Zheng; Dying to Survive
- Best Actress: Hsieh Ying-hsuan; Dear Ex
- Most awards: Shadow (4)
- Most nominations: Shadow (12)

Television in Taiwan
- Network: TTV

The 55th Golden Horse Awards (Chinese: 第55屆金馬獎) took place on November 17, 2018 at the Sun Yat-sen Memorial Hall in Taipei, Taiwan. Organized by the Taipei Golden Horse Film Festival Executive Committee, the awards honored the best in Chinese-language films of 2017 and 2018. The ceremony was hosted by Matilda Tao and televised by TTV.

== Winners and nominees ==
Best Feature Film: An Elephant Sitting Still; Dear Ex; Shadow; Dying to Survive; Long Day's Journey into Night	Best Documentary: Our Youth in Taiwan; Four Springs; Late Life: The Chien-Ming Wang Story; 24th Street; Umbrella Diaries: The First Umbrella
Best Animation Feature: On Happiness Road; Cats and Peachtopia; A Dog's Life	Best Live Action Short Film: A Final Reunion; 02-06; Temporary; Brotherhood; My World
Best Animated Short Film: Where Am I Going?; Si So Mi; Infidelity; Muteum; Kin's Hair	Best Director: Zhang Yimou — Shadow; Bi Gan — Long Day's Journey into Night; Jiang Wen — Hidden Man; Pema Tseden — Jinpa; Lou Ye — The Shadow Play
Best Leading Actor: Xu Zheng — Dying to Survive; Duan Yihong — The Looming Storm; Roy Chiu — Dear Ex; Deng Chao — Shadow; Peng Yuchang — An Elephant Sitting Still	Best Leading Actress: Hsieh Ying-hsuan — Dear Ex; Sun Li — Shadow; Zhao Tao — Ash Is Purest White; Zeng Meihuizi — Three Husbands; Zhou Xun — Last Letter
Best Supporting Actor: Ben Yuen — Tracey; Lee Hong-chi — Cities of Last Things; Cheng Jen-shuo — Gatao 2: Rise of the King; Zhang Yu — Dying to Survive; Tian Zhuangzhuang — Us and Them	Best Supporting Actress: Ding Ning — Cities of Last Things; Kara Hui — Tracey; Xu Qing — Hidden Man; Phoebe Huang — Dad's Suit; Zhang Zifeng — Last Letter
Best New Director: Wen Muye — Dying to Survive; Dong Yue — The Looming Storm; Mag Hsu and Hsu Chih-yen — Dear Ex; Rene Liu — Us and Them; Hu Bo — An Elephant Sitting Still	Best New Performer: Si Pangoyod — Long Time No Sea; Joseph Huang — Dear Ex; Hsieh Chang-ying — Cities of Last Things; Zhang Zaixing — Gatao 2: Rise of the King; Fu Meng-po — Father to Son
Best Original Screenplay: Han Jianü, Zhong Wei and Wen Muye — Dying to Survive; Dong Yue — The Looming Storm; Lu Shih-yuan and Mag Hsu — Dear Ex; Ho Wi Ding — Cities of Last Things; Shunji Iwai — Last Letter	Best Adapted Screenplay: Hu Bo — An Elephant Sitting Still; Sung Hsin-yin — On Happiness Road; Li Wei and Zhang Yimou — Shadow; Yuan Yuan, Ho Shing-ming, Pan Yu, An Wei and Rene Liu — Us and Them; Pema Tseden — Jinpa
Best Cinematography: Yao Hung-i, Dong Jinsong and David Chizallet — Long Day's Journey into Night; Zhao Xiaoding — Shadow; Nagao Nakashima — Xiao Mei; Fan Chao — An Elephant Sitting Still; Jake Pollock — The Shadow Play	Best Visual Effects: Samson Wong — Shadow; Ellen Poon — Monster Hunt 2; Wang Shaoshuai and Yang Yuejuan — Hidden Man; Norio Ishii — Legend of the Demon Cat; Chuck Chae, Park Young-soo, Hideaki Maegawa and Ji Myung-goo — Detective Dee: The Four Heavenly Kings
Best Art Direction: Ma Kwong-wing — Shadow; Liu Qiang — The Looming Storm; Liu Qing — Hidden Man; Tu Nan and Lu Wei — Legend of the Demon Cat; Hwarng Wern-ying and Wang Chih-cheng — Father to Son	Best Makeup & Costume Design: Chen Minzheng — Shadow; Liu Qiang and Li Hua — The Looming Storm; Li Miao — Dying to Survive; Dong Zhongmin, Uma Wang and Zhang Shuping — Hidden Man; Chen Tongxun — Legend of the Demon Cat
Best Action Choreography: He Jun, Kenji Tanigaki and Yan Hua — Hidden Man; Dee Dee — Shadow; Kenji Tanigaki — Monster Hunt 2; Yuen Shun-yi — Master Z: The Ip Man Legacy; Bruce Law and Norman Law — The Shadow Play	Best Original Film Score: Lim Giong and Point Hsu — Long Day's Journey into Night; Loudboy — Shadow; Luming Lu — Xiao Mei; Summer Lei and Chris Hou — Father to Son; Hua Lun — An Elephant Sitting Still
Best Original Film Song: "Bali Song" — Dear Ex; Composer： Lee Ying-hung; Lyrics： Lee Ying-hung; Performer： Lee Ying-hung; "Excuse You, Boss" — Gatao 2: Rise of the King; Composer： Edsion JV; Lyrics： Edsion JV; Performer： Edsion JV; "Light Echo" — Xiao Mei; Composer： Lu Luming; Lyrics： Lu Luming; Performer： Sam Yang; "Us" — Us and Them; Composer： Chen Chien-chi; Lyrics： David Ke; Performer： Eason Chan; "Keep the Heart Out of It" — Father to Son; Composer： Summer Lei; Lyrics： Summer Lei; Performer： Summer Lei	Best Film Editing: Lei Cheng-ching — Dear Ex; Lu Qingyi, Zhou Xiaolin, Gao Ziyu and Jiang Yijun — Four Springs; Fu Yue — Our Youth in Taiwan; Jolin Zhu — Dying to Survive; Liao Ching-sung and Kong Jinglei — Us and Them
Best Sound Effects: Li Danfeng and Si Zhonglin — Long Day's Journey into Night; Emma Long and Rocky Zhang — The Looming Storm; Yang Jiang and Zhao Nan — Shadow; Kuo Li-chi — Father to Son; Fu Kang — The Shadow Play	Outstanding Taiwanese Filmmaker of the Year: Saburo Liu
Special Contribution Award: Liao Ching-sung

== Fu Yue's speech ==
When Fu Yue, won the Best Documentary and took the stage to deliver her acceptance speech, she expressed, "I hope our country can be recognized as a truly independent entity. It is the greatest wish for me as a Taiwanese." The audience responded with enthusiastic applause. This statement, perceived as leaning towards Taiwanese independence, caused a public opinion storm in mainland China, Chinese artists cited the "China: not even a bit can be left behind" picture to support the China's claim over Taiwan. Xu Zheng, the Golden Horse Best Actor, Zhou Xun and Sun Li, who were nominated for Best Actress, Hu Ge and Deng Chao, who appeared at the Golden Horse Awards, as well as Fan Bingbing, Li Chen, Liu Shishi, Wu Jinyan, He Jiong, Yao Chen, Yang Mi, Zhao Wei, Zhao Liying, Li Yifeng, Lu Han, Tang Yan, Victoria Song, Feng Shaofeng, Tong Dawei, Xie Na, Gao Yuanyuan, Lu Yi, Dilraba Dilmurat, Lynn Hung, Pang Ho-cheung, Li Bingbing and other entertainment stars all expressed this position on Weibo. In addition, Hong Kong artists William Chan, Irene Wan, and Jackson Wang, a member of South Korean group GOT7, also forwarded the Weibo post.
