= Hu Bo =

Chinese novelist and film director

- Born: 20 July 1988; Jinan, Shandong, China
- Died: 12 October 2017 (aged 29); Beijing, China
- Cause of death: Suicide
- Education: Beijing Film Academy
- Occupations: Author; film director
- Years active: 2014–2017

Hu Bo (Chinese: 胡波; 20 July 1988 – 12 October 2017), also known by his pen name Hu Qian (Chinese: 胡遷), was a Chinese novelist and film director, best known for his only feature film An Elephant Sitting Still (2018), which garnered widespread praise from critics. He died by suicide on 12 October 2017 at the age of 29, soon after he finished that film.

== Early life ==
Born in 1988 in Jinan, Shandong, China, Hu Bo graduated from Beijing Film Academy with a degree in Film Directing in 2014.

== Career ==
Hu's short film Distant Father (2014) won Best Director at the 4th Golden Koala Chinese Film Festival.

His two novels, Huge Crack, and Bullfrog, were both published in 2017.

The production of his first feature An Elephant Sitting Still (2018), based on a story with the same title from his 2017 novel Huge Crack, began in July 2016. He killed himself soon after finishing the film on 12 October 2017 at the age of 29, making it his first and last feature film. According to reports, his death was due to conflicts over the film with his producers Liu Xuan and Wang Xiaoshuai.

== Novels ==
- Huge Crack (大裂) (2017)
- Bullfrog (牛蛙) (2017)
- Farewell to the Faraway (远处的拉莫) (2018)

== Filmography ==
- To Cordoba (short, 2011)
- Milk Stealer (short, 2012)
- Distant Father (short, 2014)
- Night Runner (short, 2014)
- Man in the Well (short, 2017)
- An Elephant Sitting Still (2018)

== Awards ==
- 2014 – 4th Golden Koala Chinese Film Festival: Best Director (Distant Father)
- 2018 – 55th Golden Horse Awards: Best Adapted Screenplay (An Elephant Sitting Still)
