= China: not even a bit can be left behind =

Chinese Communist Party slogan

The "China: not even a bit can be left behind" poster created by People's Daily

"China: not even a bit can be left behind" (Chinese: 中国一点都不能少; pinyin: Zhōngguó yīdiǎn dōu bùnéng shǎo) is a political slogan that emerged in China in July 2016 to protest the South China Sea Arbitration. It first appeared in an image posted on the official Weibo account of the People's Daily, the official newspaper of the Central Committee of the Chinese Communist Party.

== History ==
On 11 July 2016, as the arbitration results of the South China Sea Arbitration were about to be announced, the People's Daily's New Media Center planned and launched a special report entitled "China: not even a bit can be left behind". It expressed the attitude and position of the Chinese authorities through pictures, H5 animations, posters, articles, videos, nine-square grid diagrams, etc., and provided a detailed interpretation of the white paper "China Insists on Resolving the Relevant Disputes between China and the Philippines in the South China Sea through Negotiation" and publicized the relevant claims. The news special subsequently won the first prize of the 27th China News Award. The People's Daily also posted the picture "China: not even a bit can be left behind" on its official Weibo account, with the text "This is China, not a inch less", and launched the Weibo topic "#China: not even a bit can be left behind". The Weibo hashtag was re-blogged over 1.5 million times the evening it debuted. Numerous Chinese celebrities expressed support online for China's position, which in turn prompted a broader public response. Celebrities forwarding the message included Jiang Jinfu, Jia Nailiang, Yang Yang, and Li Chen. Lay Zhang changed his Instagram and Weibo profile picture to the picture of "China: not even a bit can be left behind". Victoria Song forwarded the People's Daily Weibo post and posted the picture of "China: not even a bit can be left behind" on her Instagram account.

After the 55th Golden Horse Awards in 2018 caused a public opinion storm in mainland China, Chinese artists cited this picture to support the China's claim over Taiwan. Xu Zheng, the Golden Horse Best Actor, Zhou Xun and Sun Li, who were nominated for Best Actress, Hu Ge and Deng Chao, who appeared at the Golden Horse Awards, as well as Fan Bingbing, Li Chen, Liu Shishi, Wu Jinyan, He Jiong, Yao Chen, Yang Mi, Zhao Wei, Zhao Liying, Li Yifeng, Lu Han, Tang Yan, Victoria Song, Feng Shaofeng, Tong Dawei, Xie Na, Gao Yuanyuan, Lu Yi, Dilraba Dilmurat, Lynn Hung, Pang Ho-cheung, Li Bingbing and other entertainment stars all expressed this position on Weibo. In addition, Hong Kong artists William Chan, Irene Wan, and Jackson Wang, a member of South Korean group GOT7, also forwarded the Weibo post.

The Chinese TV series Go Go Squid! was embroiled in a controversy in 2019 after a map was seen in episode 39 that did not include Taiwan and Hainan Island as part of China. The map colored China blue but kept Taiwan and Hainan colorless, indicating they were not part of the country. According to the Ministry of Natural Resources, it also 'incorrectly' represented the India-China border, the South China Sea and the Kashmir region. The female lead Yang Zi forwarded her studio's Weibo post denying the rumors and added the caption "National sovereignty, unity and territorial integrity are inviolable. China: not even a bit can be left behind!"
