= Fu Yue (director) =

Taiwanese film director (born 1982)

Fu Yue (Chinese: 傅榆; pinyin: Fù Yú; Wade–Giles: Fu Yü; born 20 September 1982) is a Taiwanese film director.

== Early life and education ==
Fu Yue was born to a Malaysian Chinese father and an Indonesian Chinese mother. She enrolled at National Chengchi University within the Department of Radio and Television. In 2008, Fu earned a master's degree from the Graduate Institute of Sound and Image Studies of the Tainan National University of the Arts. She completed the film Mirror!, in which her parents discussed politics in Taiwan with another couple supportive of the Democratic Progressive Party, to finish her degree.

== Career ==
In 2012, Fu produced the political documentary, Dialogue Between Blue & Green. In 2015, Fu contributed the segment A Commander Made By Accident, which covered activist Chen Wei-ting, to the anthology film Sunflower Occupation.

Fu directed the documentary film Our Youth in Taiwan, about the events of the Sunflower Student Movement. The film won the Golden Horse Award for Best Documentary at the 55th Golden Horse Awards. During Fu's acceptance speech, she said "I really hope that one day, our country can be treated as a truly independent entity ... This is my greatest wish as a Taiwanese." Following this reference to the political status of Taiwan, Chinese broadcasts of the award ceremony were censored, and Fu's work was removed from listed award winners on several Chinese film databases. Fu defended her comments in a subsequent post to Facebook: "You can’t avoid the topic by simply saying, ‘Let politics be politics; let art be art’... As a director, I had to speak up for my work... I didn't make my remarks 'on an impulse,' or 'instigated by the DPP government' as suggested by some Chinese netizens. I said what I had always wanted to say about the film. I am willing to accept whatever consequence brought to my career in the future."
