= Eímear Noone =

Irish conductor and composer

Eimear Noone
- Born: 1970s Kilconnell, County Galway, Ireland
- Occupations: composer, conductor
- Website: https://www.eimearnoonemusic.com/

Eímear Noone (born in Kilconnell, County Galway) is an Irish conductor and composer, best known for her work on video game music. She has conducted the Philadelphia Orchestra, the Royal Philharmonic, Orchestre National de Bretagne, the Sydney Symphony, and the Danish National Symphony Orchestra. Noone was the first woman to conduct at the Oscars on 9 February 2020, leading the orchestra in excerpts from the five nominated film scores. Noone was also the first woman to conduct at the National Concert Hall in Dublin, Ireland.

== Early life ==
Originally from Kilconnell, Noone is a graduate of Trinity College, Dublin who has taught conducting for UCLA Extension, Columbia College Chicago, the Society of Composers and Lyricists, and the LA Conducting Salon at the LA Ballet School. Noone co-founded the Dublin City Concert Orchestra and is co-creator of the Dublin International Game Music Festival. X3

== Work ==
Noone's composing and conducting work includes 26 film and video game titles, including Blizzard Entertainment titles Overwatch (2016), Hearthstone (2014), Diablo III (2012), Starcraft II: Wings of Liberty (2010), and World of Warcraft (2004) and its expansions., as well as The Legend of Zelda 25th Anniversary Special Orchestra CD included with The Legend of Zelda: Skyward Sword and the following Symphony of the Goddesses Tour. As a part of the 25th Anniversary celebration of the Legend of Zelda series, Eímear Noone's conducting was filmed as the first three-dimensional footage of a symphony orchestra for the Nintendo 3DS. Noone has helped bring to life BASE Hologram's new show, The Maria Callas Hologram Tour. Featuring conducting by Eímear Noone and a hologram of the iconic soprano and live, synced, classical music to match the singers performance.

In 2016 she worked with Tommy Tallarico, conducting the Video Games Live European Tour.

In 2019 she took over from Jessica Curry as the presenter of the Classic FM show High Score, which features orchestral arrangements of video games music.

In 2020, she became the first female conductor to perform at the Academy Awards.

== Awards and nominations ==
Eímear Noone's score for "World of WarCraft: Warlords of Draenor" received the "Hollywood Music in Media Award" in 2014 for "Best Video Game Score", and was nominated for five "Annual game Music Awards 2014".
