= Father to Son (film) =

2018 Taiwanese drama film directed by Hsiao Ya-chuan

- Theatrical release poster
- Directed by: Hsiao Ya-chuan
- Written by: Hsiao Ya-chuan
- Produced by: Shih-Wei Chang; Hou Hsiao-hsien; Jui-Lan Hsiao; Ivan Linn; Michael Wang
- Starring: Michael Huang; Aria Wang; Fu Meng-po; Kaiser Chuang; Jag Huang; Samuel Ku; Cheng-Ling Wen; Daniel Chen
- Cinematography: Tse-chung Lin
- Edited by: Yi-Ju Tung
- Music by: Chris Hou; Summer Lei
- Production companies: Bit Production; Pixelfly Digital Effects
- Distributed by: Ablaze Image
- Release dates: January 29, 2018 (IFFR); June 28, 2018
- Running time: 115 minutes
- Country: Taiwan
- Language: Mandarin
- Box office: NT$3.78 million

Father to Son is a 2018 Taiwanese drama film directed and written by Hsiao Ya-chuan. The production companies behind the film are Bit Production in association with Pixelfly Digital Effects.

The film was produced by Shih-Wei Chang, Hou Hsiao-hsien, Jui-Lan Hsiao and Michael Wang. The music was composed by Chris Hou and Summer Lei, and it was produced by Ivan Linn. The film was distributed by Ablaze Image.

== Plot ==
Van Pao-Te, who is now 60 years old, finds himself suffering from a serious illness. Instead of getting treatment, he decides to go to Japan to look for his father who abandoned him 50 years ago with the company of his son. At the same time, a young man from Hong Kong who is somehow related to Van Pao-Te's past comes to Taiwan. Two unknown journeys of self-reconciliation begin.

== Cast ==
- Michael Huang as Fan Pao-Te
- Aria Wang as Kuo Yu-Chin
- Fu Meng-po as Fan Ta-Chi
- Kaiser Chuang as Young Fan Pao-Te
- Jag Huang as Fan Pao-Te's Father
- Samuel Ku as Newman
- Cheng-Ling Wen as Young Kuo Yu-Chin
- Daniel Chen as Di

== Release ==
Father to Son premiered in the Netherlands at the International Film Festival Rotterdam on January 29, 2018, followed by a Spanish premiere at the Las Palmas de Gran Canaria International Film Festival on April 8, a premiere in Hungary at the Titanic International Filmpresence Festival on April 12, and a Taiwanese premiere at the Taipei Film Festival on June 28.

== Awards ==
=== The 20th Taipei Film Awards ===
Year	Award	Recipient	Result	Ref
2018	Best Director	Xiao Yaquan	Won	
2018	Best Soundtrack	Lei Guangxia, Hou Zhijian	Won	
2018	Best Art Design	Huang Wenying, Wang Zhicheng	Won	

=== The 55th Golden Horse Awards ===
Year	Award	Recipient	Result	Ref
2018	Best New Actor	Fu Meng-po	Nominated	
2018	Best Original Music	Lei Guangxia, Hou Zhijian	Nominated	
2018	Best Original Song	Lei Guangxia "deeply ruthless"	Nominated	
2018	Best Art Design	Huang Wenying, Wang Zhicheng	Nominated	
2018	Best Sound	Guo Liqi	Nominated	
