= South China Sea Arbitration =

2013–2016 international arbitration case

The Republic of the Philippines v. The People's Republic of China
- Registered with the Permanent Court of Arbitration
- Court: An arbitral tribunal constituted under Annex VII to the 1982 United Nations Convention on Law of the Sea (UNCLOS)
- Full case name: An Arbitration before an arbitral tribunal constituted under Annex VII to the 1982 United Nations Convention on Law of the Sea between the Republic of the Philippines and the People's Republic of China
- Decided: 29 October 2015 (Jurisdiction and Admissibility); 12 July 2016 (Merits)
- Citations: XXXIII RIAA 1 (Jurisdiction and Admissibility); XXXIII RIAA 153 (Merits)
- Transcript: https://pca-cpa.org/en/cases/7/

Ruling
- China's historic rights claims over maritime areas inside the "nine-dash line" have no lawful effect if they exceed what is entitled to under UNCLOS; There was no legal basis for China to claim historic rights to resources within the sea areas falling within "nine-dash line"; UNCLOS does not provide for a group of islands such as the Spratly Islands to generate maritime zones collectively as a unit; China had breached its obligations under the convention on the International Regulations for Preventing Collisions at Sea and Article 94 of UNCLOS concerning maritime safety; China violated its obligations to refrain from aggravating or extending the parties disputes during the pendency of the settlement process

Court membership
- Judges sitting: Presiding Arbitrator: Thomas A. Mensah; Members: Jean-Pierre Cot; Rüdiger Wolfrum; Alfred H. Soons; Stanisław Pawlak

The South China Sea Arbitration (Philippines v. China, PCA case number 2013–19) was an arbitration case brought by the Republic of the Philippines against the People's Republic of China (PRC) under Annex VII (subject to Part XV) of the United Nations Convention on the Law of the Sea (UNCLOS, ratified by the Philippines in 1984, by the PRC in 1996, opted out from Section 2 of Part XV by China in 2006) concerning certain issues in the South China Sea, including the nine-dash line introduced by the mainland-based Republic of China since as early as 1947. A tribunal of arbitrators appointed the Permanent Court of Arbitration (PCA) as the registry for the proceedings.

On 19 February 2013, China declared that it would not participate in the arbitration. On 7 December 2014, it published a white paper to elaborate its position that, among other points, the tribunal lacks jurisdiction. In accordance with Article 3 of Annex VII of UNCLOS, the Philippines appointed 1 of the 5 arbitrators, while China did not appoint any. (Note: PCA Award, Section II(B), p. 12.) On 29 October 2015, the tribunal concluded that it had jurisdiction to consider seven of the Philippines' submissions, subject to certain conditions, and postponed the consideration of its jurisdiction on the other eight submissions to the merits phase. (Note: PCA Award, Section IV(B)(6), p. 63.)

On 12 July 2016, the arbitral tribunal ruled in favor of the Philippines on most of its submissions. It clarified that while it would not "rule on any question of sovereignty ... and would not delimit any maritime boundary", China's historic rights claims over maritime areas (as opposed to land masses and territorial waters) within the "nine-dash line" have no lawful effect unless entitled to under UNCLOS. (Note: PCA Award, Section V(F)(d)(264, 266, 267), p. 113.) (Note: PCA Award, Section V(F)(d)(278), p. 117.) China has rejected the ruling, as has Taiwan. As of November 2023, 26 governments support the ruling, 17 issued generally positive statements noting the ruling but not called for compliance, and eight rejected it. The United Nations does not hold any position on the case or on the disputed claims.

== Background ==
Territorial claims in the South China Sea

Neither the Republic of China nor the People's Republic of China were invited to the treaty negotiations after Japan renounced all claims to the Spratly Islands and other conquered islands and territories in the Treaty of San Francisco, and the treaty did not designate successor states. On 15 August 1951, in reaction to China's exclusion from the talks, the PRC government issued the Declaration on the Draft Peace Treaty with Japan by the US and the UK and on the San Francisco Conference by the then Foreign Minister Zhou Enlai, protesting the absence of any provisions in the draft on who shall take over the South China Sea islands. It reasserted China's sovereignty over the archipelagos in the South China Sea, including the Spratly Islands, and reiterated that "the Chinese government of the day had taken over those islands" and that the PRC's rightful sovereignty "shall remain intact".

On 28 April 1952, the United States presided over the signing of the Treaty of Peace between Japan and the Republic of China. Article 2 of the document provided that "It is recognized that under Article 2 of the Treaty of Peace which Japan signed at the city of San Francisco on 8 September 1951 (hereinafter referred to as the San Francisco Treaty), Japan has renounced all right, title, and claim to Taiwan (Formosa) and Penghu (the Pescadores) as well as the Spratly Islands and the Paracel Islands."

The Philippines bases its claim on its geographical proximity to the Spratly Islands.

In May 1956, the dispute escalated after Filipino national Tomas Cloma and his followers settled on the islands and declared the territory as "Freedomland", now known as Kalayaan for himself and later requested to make the territory a protectorate of the Philippines. Tomas Cloma even stole China (ROC)'s national flag from the Taiping Island. In July 1956, he apologised officially for his act and he surrendered the flag he stole to China's embassy in Manila. On 2 October 1956, he wrote a letter and ensured he would not make further training voyages or landings in the territorial waters of China (ROC).

Philippine troops were sent to three of the islands in 1968, when the Philippines were under President Ferdinand Marcos. In the 1970s, some countries began to occupy islands and reefs in the Spratlys. In 1978, President Marcos issued a decree placing the Spratlys under the jurisdiction of the province of Palawan. The PRC claims it is entitled to the Paracel and Spratly Islands because they were allegedly regarded as integral parts of China under the Ming dynasty based on a 1947 map showing a nine-dash line.

Vietnam states that the islands have belonged to it since the 17th century, using historical documents of ownership as evidence. Hanoi began to occupy the westernmost islands during this period.

In the early 1970s, Malaysia joined the dispute by claiming the islands nearest to it.

Brunei also claims Louisa Reef and Rifleman Bank, although some sources consider that claim to be weak.

== Participants ==
The arbitration case involved the Philippines and China but only the Philippines participated in the arbitration.

1734 Carta Hydrographica y Chorographica de las Islas Filipinas

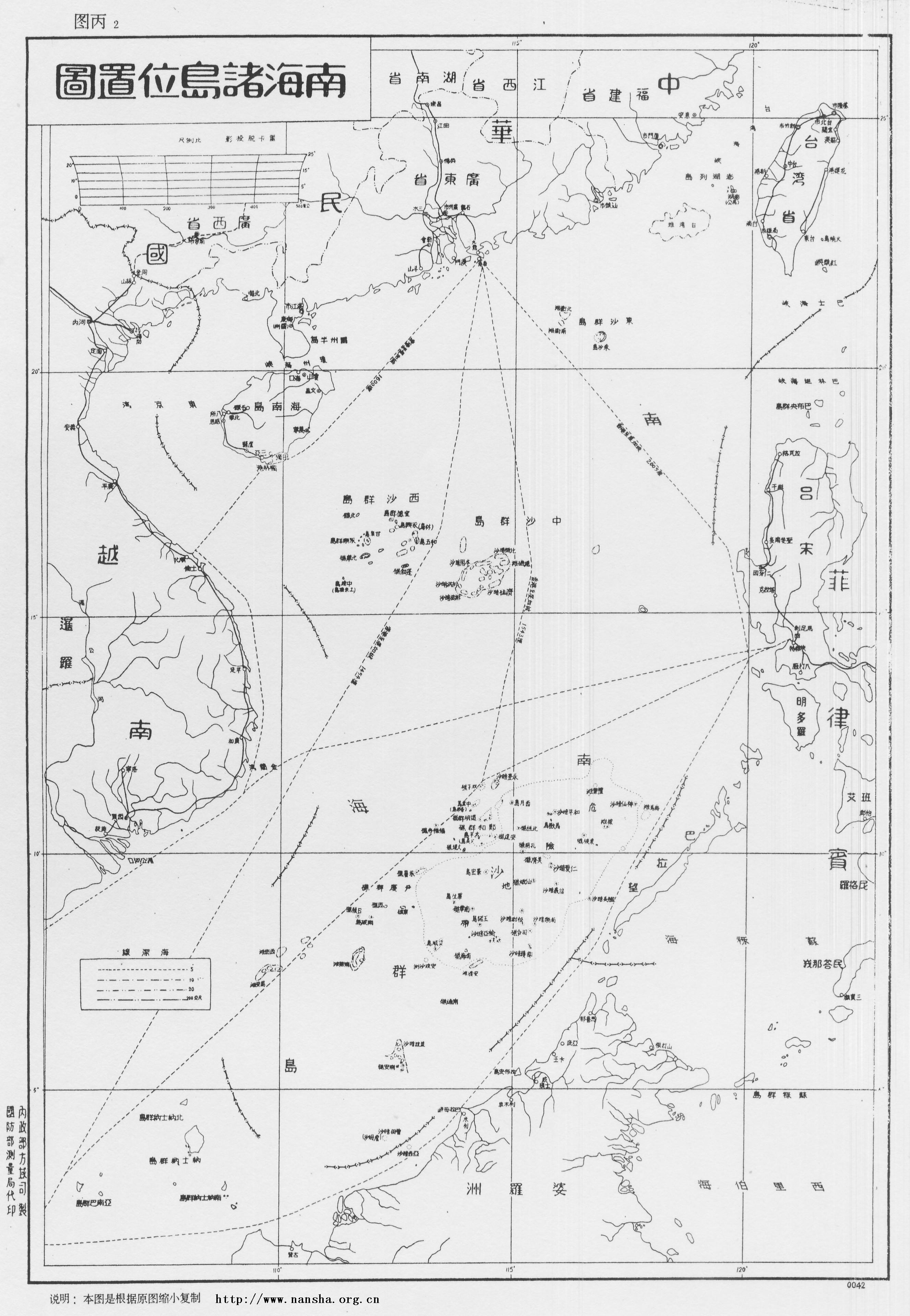
China's then eleven-dash line map of the South China Sea, circa 1947

=== Optional exceptions to applicability of compulsory procedure ===
Article 298 of Section 3 of Part XV of the Convention provides optional exceptions to the applicability of compulsory procedures provided in Section 2. China made a declaration in 2006 in accordance with this provision of the Convention purporting not to accept any of the procedures provided for in section 2 of Part XV of the convention. Many countries including the United Kingdom, Australia, Italy, France, Canada, and Spain had made similar declarations to reject any of the procedures provided for in sections 2 of Part XV of the convention with respect to the different categories of disputes. However, the Tribunal held that this dispute did not fall within the exceptions provided in Article 298, and was therefore admissible.

=== Philippine stance ===
The Philippine's decision to initiate the arbitration was prompted by the 2012 Scarborough Shoal fishing dispute and the standoff that resulted during the dispute.

In the arbitration, the Philippines contended that the "nine-dotted line" claim by China is invalid because it violates the UNCLOS agreements about exclusive economic zones and territorial seas. Its position was that because most of the features in the South China Sea, such as most of the Spratly Islands, cannot sustain life, they cannot be given their own continental shelf as defined in the convention.

In framing its contentions, the Philippines' "submissions scrupulously avoided treading on questions of territorial sovereignty and boundary delimitation, which would fall outside the tribunal's" jurisdiction.

- Agent: Office of the Solicitor General of the Philippines
- Counsel and Advocates
  - Paul S. Reichler, Lawrence H. Martin and Andrew B. Loewenstein of Foley Hoag
  - Professor Bernard H. Oxman of University of Miami School of Law
  - Professor Philippe Sands QC of Matrix Chambers
  - Professor Alan Boyle of Essex Court Chambers

=== Chinese stance ===
The Philippines' initiation of the arbitration was followed by extensive internal debates among Chinese policymakers about whether China should participate in the arbitration. Participating and losing could impact domestic sentiment and might have regional implications for China's other maritime territorial claims. The nine-dash line predated UNCLOS, and its lack of defined coordinates was a weakness under current international law. Chinese policymakers had previously sought to preserve the ambiguity of its status in an effort to preserve the status quo and manage its claims and relations with neighbors. Policymakers were also reticent because of concerns that the proceedings would not be fair, citing the fact that the president of ITLOS, Shunji Yanai, was Japanese. Some policymakers also were concerned about the procedure given that China had no precedent for using arbitration to resolve territorial disagreements. Others favored participation in order to be able to shape the proceedings, including because only by participating would China have the ability to appoint an arbitrator to the panel.

China declined to participate in the arbitration and stated that it would not accept any arbitration result. As part of its grounds for nonparticipation and nonacceptance, China cited the fact that China is a signatory to the 2006 UNCLOS exclusion clause which removes sovereignty and boundary delimitations issues from arbitration procedures.

China stated that several treaties with the Philippines stipulate that bilateral negotiations be used to resolve border disputes and that the Philippines of violating the 2002 ASEAN-China voluntary Declaration on the Conduct of Parties in the South China Sea, which also stipulated bilateral negotiations as the means of resolving border and other disputes. According to this view, the Philippines had breached the parties' mutual agreements by beginning the arbitration unilaterally.

China described the proceedings as undermining regional stability and said that the Philippines was manipulating international law to damage China's territorial claims. The arbitration did have jurisdiction over sovereignty matters; China contended that the Philippines claims were in fact sovereignty arguments by another name.

China's December 2014 white paper ("On the Matter of Jurisdiction in the South China Sea Arbitration Initiated by the Republic of the Philippines") focused on the contention that the dispute was not subject to arbitration because it was ultimately a matter of sovereignty, not exploitation rights. China also cited its signing of the 2006 UNCLOS arbitration exclusion for sovereignty and boundary limitations disputes.

== Claimants of South China Sea islands ==
=== Taiwanese stance ===
Taiwan, officially the Republic of China, stated that the South China Sea islands were first discovered, named, and used by Chinese people. It currently administers Taiping Island or Itu Aba, the largest of the Spratly Islands, but was neither consulted nor invited to the arbitration. Taipei argues that Taiping can sustain human habitation with its freshwater wells and produce, and is thus an island under UNCLOS. It had invited the Philippines and five arbitrators to visit Taiping; the Philippines rejected the invitation, and there was no response from the arbitrators. According to Ian Storey, a regional expert at the ISEAS–Yusof Ishak Institute, for decades, the common understanding among scholars was that "Itu Aba is the only island in the Spratlys". After the tribunal downgraded Itu Aba to a rock, Taiwan rejected the ruling, saying it is "not legally binding on the ROC". It pointed out that the status of Itu Aba was not a point of contention raised by the Philippines, who had brought the case, but was opened up by the tribunal on its own initiative. Lawmakers from the ruling KMT and the opposition DPP also joined in to express their disapprovals. Taiwan's Fisheries Agency declared that Taiwanese fishermen could continue to operate in the waters surrounding Taiping. The coast guard had already deployed a vessel to the area, and a naval frigate mission was pushed ahead of schedule in response to the ruling.

=== Vietnamese stance ===
On 11 December 2014, Vietnam filed a statement to the tribunal which put forward three points: 1) Vietnam supports the filing of this case by the Philippines, 2) it rejects China's "nine-dashed line", and 3) it asks the arbitral tribunal to take note of Vietnam's claims on certain islands such as the Paracels.

=== Other stances ===
Brunei sent its own UNCLOS claim through a preliminary submission prior to the arbitration. In May 2009, Malaysia and Vietnam, as well as Vietnam alone, filed claims to the International Tribunal for the Law of the Sea with regard to the islands. This was in relation to extending their claimed continental shelves and Exclusive Economic Zones. The People's Republic of China rejected the claims since those violate the nine-dash line. The Philippines challenged the Malaysian claim stating that the claims overlap with the North Borneo dispute. Indonesia made a comment asking whether China's view regarding rocks that cannot sustain human habitation or economic life of their own apply to the South China Sea islands as well as Japan's Okinotorishima.

In 2015 the Philippines offered to downgrade its claim over parts of the Malaysian state of Sabah in exchange for Malaysia to adopt a different position on maritime claims that could help strengthen Philippines' case in its arbitration against China. However, the proposed position was considered to be against Malaysia's maritime interest, and adopting it would have threatened Malaysia's ties with China.

== Arbitration process ==
The arbitration tribunal formed on 21 June 2013. The Philippines presented its petition on 30 March 2014. The contentions in its initial petition disputed the nine-dash line's validity, China's environmental impact, and the legality of China's contact with Filipino vessels in the area. In 2015, the Philippines added contentions based on China's land reclamation projects.

Following China's issuance of its December 2014 white paper on lack of jurisdiction, the tribunal decided to address jurisdictional issues first. The tribunal convened a Hearing on Jurisdiction and Admissibility on 7 to 13 July 2015, rendered an Award on Jurisdiction and Admissibility on 29 October 2015, convened a hearing on the merits from 24 to 30 November 2015, and issued a unanimous award on 12 July 2016.

The tribunal's November merits hearing proceeded without China's attendance. Because China did not participate in the arbitration, the arbitrators based their view of the Chinese position on China's 2014 white paper and letters sent to the tribunal from China's ambassador to the Netherlands.

=== Hearings ===
On 7 July 2015, case hearings began with the Philippines asking the arbitral tribunal to invalidate China's claims. The hearings were also attended by observers from Indonesia, Japan, Malaysia, Thailand and Vietnam.

On 29 October 2015, the tribunal ruled that it had the power to hear the case. It agreed to take up seven of the 15 submissions made by Manila, in particular whether Scarborough Shoal and low-tide areas like Mischief Reef can be considered islands. It set aside seven more pointed claims mainly accusing Beijing of acting unlawfully to be considered at the next hearing on the case's merits. Manila's final submission was a request that the judges order that "China shall desist from further unlawful claims and activities." The tribunal told Manila to narrow the scope of this request.

=== Award on Jurisdiction and Admissibility ===
On 29 October 2015, the PCA published the award by the arbitral tribunal on Jurisdiction and Admissibility for the case. The award favored the Philippines on most of its contentions. The tribunal found that it has jurisdiction to consider the following seven Philippines' Submissions. (Each number is the Philippines' Submissions number.) The tribunal reserved consideration of its jurisdiction to rule on Nos. 1, 2, 5, 8, 9, 12, and 14.

- No.3 Philippines' position that Scarborough Shoal is a rock under Article 121(3).
- No.4 Philippines' position that Mischief Reef, Second Thomas Shoal, and Subi Reef are low tide elevations that do not generate entitlement to maritime zones.
- No.6 Whether Gaven Reef and McKennan Reef (including Hughes Reef) are low-tide elevations "that do not generate any maritime entitlements of their own".
- No.7 Whether Johnson Reef, Cuarteron Reef, and Fiery Cross Reef do or do not generate an entitlement to an exclusive economic zone or continental shelf.
- No.10 "premised on [the] fact that China has unlawfully prevented Philippine fishermen from carrying out traditional fishing activities within the territorial sea of Scarborough Shoal."
- No.11 "China's failure to protect and preserve the marine environment at these two shoals [Scarborough Shoal and Second Thomas Shoal]."
- No.13 Philippines' protest against China's "purported law enforcement activities as violating the Convention on the International Regulations for the Prevention of Collisions at Sea and also violating UNCLOS".

The tribunal stated in the award that there are continuing disputes in all of the 15 submissions from the Philippines, but for submissions such as No.3, No.4, No.6 and No.7, no known claims from the Philippines prior to the initiation of this arbitration exist, and that China was not aware of (nor had previously opposed) such claims prior to the initiation of arbitration. For Submissions No.8 to No.14, the tribunal held the view that the lawfulness of China's maritime activities in the South China Sea is not related to sovereignty.

== Award ==
On 12 July 2016, the PCA published the award by the arbitral tribunal which it states is final and binding as set out in the convention. Conclusions expressed in the award included the following:

Regarding the "Nine-Dash Line" and China's claim in the maritime areas of the South China Sea
- The [UNCLOS] Convention defines the scope of maritime entitlements in the South China Sea, which may not extend beyond the limits imposed therein. (Note: PCA Award, Section V(F)(d)(277), p.116.)
- China's claims to historic rights, or other sovereign rights or jurisdiction, with respect to the maritime areas of the South China Sea encompassed by the relevant part of the 'nine-dash line' are contrary to the Convention and without lawful effect to the extent that they exceed the geographic and substantive limits of China's maritime entitlements under the Convention. The Convention superseded any historic rights or other sovereign rights or jurisdiction in excess of the limits imposed therein. (Note: PCA Award, Section V(F)(d)(278), p. 117.)
Regarding the status of features as above/below water at high tide (Submissions no. 4 and 6)
- High-tide features: (a) Scarborough Shoal, (b) Cuarteron Reef, (c) Fiery Cross Reef, (d) Johnson Reef, (e) McKennan Reef, and (f) Gaven Reef (North). (Note: PCA Award, Section VI(B)(5)(d)(382), p.174.)
- Low-tide elevations: (a) Hughes Reef, (b) Gaven Reef (South), (c) Subi Reef, (d) Mischief Reef, (e) Second Thomas Shoal. (Note: PCA Award, Section VI(B)(5)(d)(383), p. 174.)
- Hughes Reef lies within 12 nautical miles of the high-tide features on McKennan Reef and Sin Cowe Island, Gaven Reef (South) lies within 12 nautical miles of the high-tide features at Gaven Reef (North) and Namyit Island, and that Subi Reef lies within 12 nautical miles of the high-tide feature of Sandy Cay on the reefs to the west of Thitu. (Note: PCA Award, Section VI(B)(5)(d)(384), p. 174.)
Regarding the status of features as rocks/islands (Submissions no. 3, 5, and 7)
- Scarborough Shoal contains, within the meaning of Article 121(1) of the Convention, naturally formed areas of land, surrounded by water, which are above water at high tide. However, under Article 121(3) of the Convention, the high-tide features at Scarborough Shoal are rocks that cannot sustain human habitation or economic life of their own and accordingly shall have no exclusive economic zone or continental shelf. (Note: PCA Award, Section VI(C)(5)(f)(643), p. 259.)
- Johnson Reef, Cuarteron Reef, and Fiery Cross Reef contain, within the meaning of Article 121(1) of the Convention, naturally formed areas of land, surrounded by water, which are above water at high tide. However, for purposes of Article 121(3) of the Convention, the high-tide features at Johnson Reef, Cuarteron Reef, and Fiery Cross Reef are rocks that cannot sustain human habitation or economic life of their own and accordingly shall have no exclusive economic zone or continental shelf. (Note: PCA Award, Section VI(C)(5)(f)(644), p. 259.)
- The high-tide features at Gaven Reef (North) and McKennan Reef are rocks that cannot sustain human habitation or economic life of their own and accordingly shall have no exclusive economic zone or continental shelf. (Note: PCA Award, Section VI(C)(5)(f)(645), p.259.)
- Mischief Reef and Second Thomas Shoal are both low-tide elevations that generate no maritime zones of their own [and] that none of the high-tide features in the Spratly Islands are capable of sustaining human habitation or an economic life of their own within the meaning of those terms in Article 121(3) of the Convention. All of the high-tide features in the Spratly Islands are therefore legally rocks for purposes of Article 121(3) and do not generate entitlements to an exclusive economic zone or continental shelf. There is, accordingly, no possible entitlement by China to any maritime zone in the area of either Mischief Reef or Second Thomas Shoal and no jurisdictional obstacle to the tribunal's consideration of the Philippines' Submission No. 5. (Note: PCA Award, Section VI(C)(5)(f)(646), p.259-260.)
- Both Mischief Reef and Second Thomas Shoal are located within 200 nautical miles of the Philippines' coast on the island of Palawan and are located in an area that is not overlapped by the entitlements generated by any maritime feature claimed by China. It follows, therefore, that, as between the Philippines and China, Mischief Reef and Second Thomas Shoal form part of the exclusive economic zone and continental shelf of the Philippines. (Note: PCA Award, Section VI(C)(5)(f)(647), p. 260.)
Regarding alleged interference with the Philippines' sovereign rights in its EEZ and continental shelf (Submission no. 8)
- China has, through the operation of its marine surveillance vessels with respect to M/V Veritas Voyager on 1 to 2 March 2011 breached Article 77 of the Convention with respect to the Philippines' sovereign rights over the non-living resources of its continental shelf in the area of Reed Bank [and] that China has, by promulgating its 2012 moratorium on fishing in the South China Sea, without exception for areas of the South China Sea falling within the exclusive economic zone of the Philippines and without limiting the moratorium to Chinese flagged vessels, breached Article 56 of the Convention with respect to the Philippines' sovereign rights over the living resources of its exclusive economic zone. (Note: PCA Award, Section VII(A)(5)(c)(716), p. 286.)
Regarding alleged failure to prevent Chinese nationals from exploiting the Philippines' living resources (Submission no. 9)
- China has, through the operation of its marine surveillance vessels in tolerating and failing to exercise due diligence to prevent fishing by Chinese flagged vessels at Mischief Reef and Second Thomas Shoal in May 2013, failed to exhibit due regard for the Philippines' sovereign rights with respect to fisheries in its exclusive economic zone. Accordingly, China has breached its obligations under Article 58(3) of the Convention. (Note: PCA Award, Section VII(B)(5)(d)(757), p.297.)
Regarding China's actions in respect of traditional fishing at Scarborough Shoal (Submission no. 10)
- China has, through the operation of its official vessels at Scarborough Shoal from May 2012 onwards, unlawfully prevented Filipino fishermen from engaging in traditional fishing at Scarborough Shoal. (Note: PCA Award, Section VII(C)(5)(c)(814), p. 318.)
Regarding alleged failure to protect and preserve the marine environment (Submissions no. 11 and 12(B))
- China has, through its toleration and protection of, and failure to prevent Chinese fishing vessels engaging in harmful harvesting activities of endangered species at Scarborough Shoal, Second Thomas Shoal and other features in the Spratly Islands, breached Articles 192 and 194(5) of the Convention. (Note: PCA Award, Section VII(D)(5)(e)(992), p. 397.)
- China has, through its island-building activities at Cuarteron Reef, Fiery Cross Reef, Gaven Reef (North), Johnson Reef, Hughes Reef, Subi Reef and Mischief Reef, breached Articles 192, 194(1), 194(5), 197, 123, and 206 of the Convention. (Note: PCA Award, Section VII(D)(5)(e)(993), p. 397.)
Regarding occupation and construction activities on Mischief Reef (Submission no. 12)
- China has, through its construction of installations and artificial islands at Mischief Reef without the authorisation of the Philippines, breached Articles 60 and 80 of the Convention with respect to the Philippines' sovereign rights in its exclusive economic zone and continental shelf [and], as a low-tide elevation, Mischief Reef is not capable of appropriation. (Note: PCA Award, Section VII(E)(5)(c)(1043), p. 415.)
Regarding operation of law enforcement vessels in a dangerous manner (Submission no. 13)
- China has, by virtue of the conduct of Chinese law enforcement vessels in the vicinity of Scarborough Shoal, created serious risk of collision and danger to Philippine vessels and personnel. The tribunal finds China to have violated Rules 2, 6, 7, 8, 15, and 16 of the COLREGS and, as a consequence, to be in breach of Article 94 of the Convention. (Note: PCA Award, Section VII(F)(5)(d)(1109), p. 435.)
Regarding aggravation or extension of the dispute between the parties (Submission No. 14)
- China has in the course of these proceedings aggravated and extended the disputes between the Parties through its dredging, artificial island-building, and construction activities [in several particulars itemised in the award]. (Note: PCA Award, Section VIII(E)(4)(1181), p. 464.)
Regarding the future conduct of the parties (Submission no. 15)
- Both Parties are obliged to comply with the Convention, including its provisions regarding the resolution of disputes, and to respect the rights and freedoms of other States under the Convention. Neither Party contests this. (Note: PCA Award, Section IX(D)(1201), p. 469.)

== Tribunal's position on the award ==
The tribunal had considered the issues related to the maritime areas in South China Sea. It declared its position on the award that:

"Nothing in this Award should be understood to comment in any way on China’s historic claim to the islands of the South China Sea."

Its position reaffirms that the tribunal's rulings do not apply to China's territorial sovereignty claims over the islands and maritime features in South China Sea, and the award would not make any implication in China's sovereignty claims. (Note: PCA Award, p. 137.)

== Timeline ==
- 22 January 2013 – Philippines served China with notification and Statement of Claim
- 19 February 2013 – China rejected the Philippines' Notification
- 11 July 2013 – First meeting of the arbitral tribunal at The Hague
- 31 July 2013 – Philippines commented on draft Rules of Procedure for the Tribunal
- 1 August 2013 – China indicated that "it does not accept the arbitration initiated by the Philippines"
- 27 August 2013 – Procedural Order No 1 issued via PCA Press Release on behalf of the arbitral tribunal
- 30 March 2014 – Submission of the Philippines Memorial
- 14–15 May 2014 – Second meeting of the arbitral tribunal at The Hague
- 21 May 2014 – China comments on draft Procedural Order No 2 and observes that "it does not accept the arbitration initiated by the Philippines".
- 29 May 2014 – Philippines comments on draft Procedural Order No 2
- 2 June 2014 – Procedural Order No 2 issued via PCA Press Release on behalf of the arbitral tribunal
- 15 December 2014 – China had not filed a Counter-Memorial
- 16 December 2014 – Procedural Order No 3 issued via PCA Press Release on behalf of the arbitral tribunal
- 16 March 2015 – The Philippines made a Supplemental Written Submission to the Arbitral Tribunal
- 20–21 April 2015 – Third meeting of the arbitral tribunal at The Hague
- 21 April 2015 – Procedural Order No 4 issued via PCA Press Release on behalf of the arbitral tribunal
- 7–13 July 2015 – Hearing of the arbitral tribunal at The Hague
- 29 October 2015 – PCA issued award on jurisdiction and admissibility
- 12 July 2016 – PCA issued award on merits

== Reactions ==
=== Before the ruling ===
There are countries and multinational bodies that have expressed support or opposition to the Philippines' move to take the South China Sea dispute to the Permanent Court of Arbitration. These entities however may not necessarily support either sides when it comes to the ownership of the disputed area affected by the case.

==== National governments ====
Compiled from the Center for Strategic and International Studies, the Council of the EU and the European Council, and the Philippine Daily Inquirer

Support for the arbitration/Denial of PRC's claim (43 countries)

- Albania
- Australia
- Austria
- Belgium
- Botswana
- Bosnia and Herzegovina
- Bulgaria
- Canada
- Croatia
- Cyprus
- Czech Republic
- Denmark
- Estonia
- Fiji
- Finland
- France
- Germany
- Greece
- Indonesia
- Italy
- Japan
- Latvia
- Liechtenstein
- Lithuania
- Luxembourg
- Malaysia
- Malta
- Moldova
- Montenegro
- Netherlands
- New Zealand
- Poland
- Portugal
- Romania
- Singapore
- Slovakia
- Slovenia
- Spain
- Sweden
- Thailand
- United Kingdom
- United States
- Vietnam

Opposed to arbitration (31 countries)

- Afghanistan
- Algeria
- Bahrain
- China
- Comoros
- Djibouti
- Egypt
- Gambia
- Iraq
- Jordan
- Kenya
- Kuwait
- Lebanon
- Libya
- Mauritania
- Morocco
- Niger
- Oman
- Palestine
- Papua New Guinea
- Qatar
- Saudi Arabia
- Somalia
- Sudan
- Syria
- Taiwan
- Togo
- Tunisia
- United Arab Emirates
- Vanuatu
- Yemen

No public confirmation of stance towards the arbitration

- Belarus
- Brunei
- Laos
- Pakistan
- Russia
- South Africa
- Sri Lanka

==== ASEAN ====
Within the Association of Southeast Asian Nations (ASEAN), Malaysia and Vietnam, who have territorial claims in the South China Sea, as well as Australia, Indonesia, Japan, Singapore and Thailand, sent observers to the proceedings.

In June 2016, before the tribunal issued its ruling, Malaysia's foreign ministry released what it said was a joint statement of ASEAN expressing "serious concern" over land reclamation activities in the South China Sea. Within hours of issuing the statement, Malaysia announced that ASEAN wanted the statement retracted for "urgent amendments". Malaysian Foreign Ministry's Secretary General Othman Hashim later claimed that ASEAN's foreign ministers had "unanimously agreed" to the statement at a meeting, and that "Subsequent developments pertaining to the media statement took place after the departure of the ASEAN foreign ministers".

Cambodian Prime Minister Hun Sen later gave a speech condemning reports that Cambodia had had the statement retracted in order to please China, saying, "Cambodia will not be a puppet of anyone on the South China Sea issue." Hun Sen suggested the case was a "political conspiracy" and that the ruling "will not be fair", but also said that "Cambodia will just choose to stay neutral on this issue." A few days after Hun Sen's speech, the Cambodian People's Party, which Hun Sen heads, issued a statement backing him. According to the statement, "The CPP would like to reject unjust allegations that Cambodia has destroyed the issuing of a joint statement from ASEAN on the issue of the South China Sea both in Kunming recently and in 2012".

On 9 July, shortly before the tribunal issued its ruling, Cambodia's foreign ministry issued a statement reiterating that Cambodia would not join any ASEAN statement on the ruling.

==== Australia ====
Australia has not sought to take a public position on the matter other than to state that the ruling of the tribunal should be respected. However, Australia has recognised the right of the Philippines to seek arbitration.

==== European Union ====
European Union encourages all parties to seek peaceful solutions, through dialogue and cooperation, in accordance with international law – in particular with the UN Convention on the Law of the Sea. A foreign affairs of the EU issued a statement saying "Whilst not taking a position on claims, the EU is committed to a maritime order based upon the principles of international law, in particular as reflected in the United Nations Convention on the law of the Sea (UNCLOS)". The EU later stressed that China should respect the ruling from the Hague.

==== Group of Seven ====
The Group of 7 (Canada, France, Germany, Italy, Japan, the United Kingdom, and the United States as well as a representation from the European Union) made a statement that the bloc should issue a "clear signal" to China's overlapping claims. European Council President Donald Tusk said on the sidelines of a summit in Ise-Shima that the bloc should take a "clear and tough stance" on China's contested maritime claims.

==== India ====
In August 2015, a junior Minister of State of India, V K Singh, told that territorial disputes should be resolved through peaceful means as was done by India and Bangladesh using the mechanisms provided by the UNCLOS, and parties should abide by the Declaration of the Conduct of Parties in the South China Sea. In October 2015, the Foreign Minister of India Sushma Swaraj stated in a joint statement that India supports a peaceful settlement of the dispute. Peaceful means should be used according to the principles of international law, including the UNCLOS. In April 2016, Foreign Minister Sushma Swaraj stated in a communique that Russia, India and China agreed to maintain legal order of seas based on international law, including the UNCLOS, and all related disputes should be addressed through negotiations and agreements between the parties concerned.

==== New Zealand ====
The foreign secretary of New Zealand stated in a speech that New Zealand supports the right to seek arbitration on South China Sea disputes.

==== North Atlantic Treaty Organization ====
NATO General Petr Pavel said NATO has "no legal platform" to intervene militarily in the South China Sea territorial disputes, and NATO will not interfere in other region's issues. NATO supports any regional solutions based on political and diplomatic negotiations, "rules-based international system" and peaceful means for resolving discord.

==== China ====
In May 2016, Chinese Foreign Ministry spokesperson Hua Chunying said that more than 40 countries had expressed their support for China's position. One 19 May 2016, Foreign Ministry spokesperson Hong Lei stated that Brunei, Mozambique, and Slovenia supported China's stance for negotiations to resolve South China Sea issues. In July 2016, it was reported that more than 70 countries had called for the South China Sea dispute to be resolved through negotiations, not arbitration, although American media and think tanks have expressed doubt, with the Center for Strategic and International Studies (CSIS) via its Asia Maritime Transparency Initiative (AMTI) putting the number at ten.

On the day of the arbitration decision, before the decision issued, the Ministry of Defense spokesperson stated that regardless of the ruling, China would defend its national sovereignty, security, and maritime rights. The spokesperson also sought to dispel any concern of a forceful reaction to an adverse arbitration result by emphasizing that China's then on-going exercises in the South China Sea were merely an annual and routine exercise.

==== Shanghai Cooperation Organisation ====
In a statement of the Shanghai Cooperation Organisation Secretary-General Rashid Olimov on South China Sea issue, all SCO countries agreed and supported China's efforts made to safeguard peace and stability in the South China Sea. Directly concerned states should resolve disputes through negotiation and consultation in accordance with all bilateral treaties and the Declaration on the Conduct of Parties in the South China Sea (DOC), the statement said. It urged to respect the right of every sovereign state to decide by itself the dispute resolution methods, and strongly opposed outsiders' intervention into the South China Sea issue, as well as the attempt to internationalise the dispute.

==== South Korea ====
During the 2015 East Asia Summit, South Korea's President Park Geun-hye stated that concerned parties should observe the Declaration on the Conduct of Parties in the South China Sea and that disputes should be resolved according to international law. "Korea has consistently stressed that the dispute must be peacefully resolved according to international agreements and code of conduct" and "China must guarantee the right of free navigation and flight. The Asahi Shimbun reports that the United States has made an unofficial request to South Korea to express its position on the arbitration case before the ruling but South Korea reportedly turned down the request saying its difficult make a position prior to the ruling.

=== After the ruling ===
==== National governments ====
Compiled from the Center for Strategic and International Studies, the Council of the EU and the European Council, and ASEAN

Supported ruling to be respected

- Australia
- Austria
- Belgium
- Canada
- Czech Republic
- Denmark
- Finland
- France
- Germany
- Greece
- India
- Ireland
- Italy
- Japan
- Netherlands
- New Zealand
- Philippines
- Poland
- Portugal
- Romania
- Slovakia
- South Korea
- Spain
- Sweden
- United Kingdom
- United States

Positively acknowledged ruling without any calls for compliance

- Bosnia and Herzegovina
- Bulgaria
- Croatia
- Cyprus
- Estonia
- Hungary
- Indonesia
- Latvia
- Lithuania
- Luxembourg
- Malaysia
- Malta
- Myanmar
- Singapore
- Slovenia
- Timor-Leste
- Vietnam

Neutral

- Algeria
- Brunei
- Cambodia
- Laos
- Serbia
- Thailand

Opposed ruling

- China
- Montenegro
- Pakistan
- Russia
- Sudan
- Syria
- Taiwan
- Vanuatu

==== Statements from National governments ====
- Australia: On 15 July 2016, Australian Minister for Defence, Marise Payne, and Minister for Foreign Affairs, Julie Bishop, stated that they regard the ruling "as final, and as binding", and urged all parties involved in the dispute to "abide by the ruling." The ministers also further described the court's ruling as "consistent" with the Australia's position on the matter.
- Canada: On 21 July 2016, Canadian Minister of Foreign Affairs, Stéphane Dion stated "Whether one agrees or not with the ruling, Canada believes that parties should comply with it. All parties should seize this opportunity as a stepping stone to renewed efforts to peacefully manage and resolve their disputes, in accordance with international law. Dion reiterated Canada's commitment to "the maintenance of international law and to an international rules-based order for the oceans and seas" to resolve the dispute. He also added " We are deeply concerned about regional tensions that have been escalating for a number of years and have the potential to undermine peace and stability. It is essential that all states in the region exercise restraint and avoid coercion and actions that will escalate tension".
- China: On 12 July 2016, China stated that it will not accept the ruling and continued to pursue bilateral discussions with the Philippines. The Chinese Ministry of Foreign Affairs stated, "With regard to the award rendered on 12 July 2016 by the Arbitral Tribunal in the South China Sea arbitration established at the unilateral request of the Republic of the Philippines (hereinafter referred to as the "Arbitral Tribunal"), the Ministry of Foreign Affairs of China solemnly declares that the award is null and void and has no binding force. China neither accepts nor recognises it." Chinese leader Xi Jinping stated that China's "territorial sovereignty and marine rights" in the seas would not be affected by the ruling. He also stated that China was still committed to resolving the dispute with its neighbours. On 13 July, Vice Foreign Minister Liu Zhenmin stated at a press conference that China had "taken note of the positive attitude of the new Philippine government under President Duterte toward resuming dialogue with China and progressing bilateral relationships from various aspects. We welcome this initiative with open arms."
- India: On 12 July 2016, Indian ministry of external affairs stated that the country supports freedom of navigation, and urged all parties to demonstrate an utmost respect for the UNCLOS. However, the change in India's posture was mentioned in a joint statement issued by India and the Philippines after the fifth Joint Commission on bilateral cooperation in July 2023. "They underlined the need for a peaceful settlement of disputes and for an adherence to international law, especially the UNCLOS and the 2016 Arbitral Award on the South China Sea in this regard."
- Indonesia: On 13 July 2016, Indonesia called on all parties involved in the territorial dispute to exercise self-restraint and to respect applicable international laws.
- Japan: On 16 July 2016, Japan stated that the arbitration court's ruling "is legally binding and must be respected by all parties," thus urged Beijing to respect and comply the ruling.
- Malaysia: On 13 July 2016, Malaysia called for parties involved to exercise self-restraint to avoid escalating tension. The country Foreign Ministry said in a statement that "It is important to maintain peace, security and stability through the exercise of self-restraint in the conduct of activities that may further complicate disputes or escalate tension and avoid the threat or use of force in the South China Sea".
- Pakistan: On 12 July 2016, Pakistan supported the Chinese position, that the dispute in South China Sea should be peacefully resolved through bilateral negotiations. Pakistan rejected the ruling, calling it a "unilateral imposition of decisions on others".
- Singapore: On 12 July 2016, Singapore urged that all parties involved in the South China Sea dispute to respect the legal and diplomatic processes.
- South Korea: On 13 July 2016, South Korea stated that the country supports freedom of navigation and overflight in South China Sea, and support the peaceful means in resolving dispute according to international law.
- Vietnam: On 12 July 2016, Vietnam immediately welcomed the arbitration tribunal ruling, thus announced that the country supports peace and order, also freedom of navigation and overflight in the region.

==== Chinese public ====
The "China: not even a bit can be left behind" poster created by People's Daily

The arbitration decision resulted in a large-scale outpouring of criticism from Chinese internet users. From 1 July to 20 July 2016, over five million microblogs directly addressed the decision. It was one of the most discussed topics online in China during this period. The Weibo hashtag "China: not even a bit can be left behind" was re-blogged over 1.5 million times the evening it debuted. Numerous Chinese celebrities expressed support online for China's position, which in turn prompted a broader public response.

Kentucky Fried Chicken ("KFC") restaurants in Chinese cities became locations for public protests. Protestors denounced what they viewed as United States interference in China's sovereignty issues. Viewing KFC as symbolic of American presence in China, the protestors called for a boycott of the restaurant chain.

==== United Nations ====
The United Nations says it has no position regarding the legal or procedural merits of the case and the underlying disputes. On 12 July, the Secretary-General expressed his hope for continued consultations between ASEAN and China "under the framework of the Declaration of the Conduct of Parties in the South China Sea."

The UN's International Court of Justice says it has no involvement in the case.

==== ASEAN ====
At the 24 July 2016 China-ASEAN Foreign Ministers summit, China assured ASEAN that it would not conduct land reclamation on the Scarborough Shoal. The joint statement at the conclusion of the summit emphasized the implementation of the Declaration on the Conduct of Parties in the South China Sea and urged the parties to refrain from inhabiting currently unoccupied islands, reefs, shoals, cays, and other features. This functionally urged restraint on both China and the Philippines.

==== Other reactions ====
According to F-Secure, hackers in 2016 infiltrated and extracted confidential information from the Philippines' Department of Justice and the international legal firm which had represented the Philippines at the Hague. The firm said the hack was likely backed by the Chinese government.

Academic Graham Allison observed in 2016, "None of the five permanent members of the UN Security Council have ever accepted any international court's ruling when (in their view) it infringed their sovereignty or national security interests. Thus, when China rejects the Court's decision in this case, it will be doing just what the other great powers have repeatedly done for decades."

Following the arbitration result, former Secretary-General of the Maritime and Oceans Affairs Center at the Philippines Department of Foreign Affairs Alberto Encomienda asserted that the Philippines government had lied when it stated that it had exhausted bilateral discussions prior to beginning the arbitration proceedings. According to Encomienda, who had overseen the bilateral negotiations for the Philippines side prior to the arbitration proceedings, "Manila never responded" to repeated efforts by China to resume negotiating. In Encomienda's view, the Philippines government was responsible for escalating tension on the South China Sea issues.

==== Philippine government ====
Taking office on 30 June 2016, Philippines President Rodrigo Duterte hoped a non-confrontational approach to China could eventually lead to joint exploration of the South China Sea. This was followed by attempts to initiate dialogues from both sides. On 8 August 2016, the Philippines dispatched former president Fidel V. Ramos to Hong Kong to mitigate tensions following the arbitration result. Duterte and Chinese leader Xi Jinping also created the biannual Bilateral Consultation Mechanism on the South China Sea, a process allowing the two nations to peacefully manage disputes and strengthen their relations.

In March 2017, after seeing a Chinese vessel around the Benham Rise, Duterte ordered the Philippine Navy to build structures on the undersea feature to assert sovereign rights and named it Philippine Rise in May. He also ordered the armed forces of the Philippines to fortify the islands in the South China Sea that are under Philippine control in response to accusations of being too cozy to China.

In November 2018, the Philippines and China signed 29 agreements, including a memorandum of understanding on joint oil-and-gas developments. In September 2019, Duterte said Xi had offered the Philippines a controlling stake in a gas deal in the Reed Bank if the Philippines set aside the Hague ruling.

RAND Corporation analyst Derek Grossman observed that by June 2020, Duterte's hopes for more Chinese investments and loans had not materialized. Shortly after, Duterte called on the Department of Foreign Affairs to demand China recognize the arbitration ruling. During a speech at the UN in September 2020, Duterte affirmed the ruling, stating "the award is now part of international law, beyond compromise and beyond the reach of passing governments to dilute, diminish, or abandon."

The election of Philippine president Bongbong Marcos in 2022 saw the onset of worsening Philippine-China relations and frequent skirmishes in the South China Sea.

==== Subsequent reactions ====
In July 2026, 14 nations and the European Union each issued joint statements commemorating and backing the 2016 ruling.

== See also ==
- Baselines of the Chinese territorial sea
- Baselines of the Philippines
- Territorial disputes in the South China Sea
  - Scarborough Shoal standoff
  - Great Wall of Sand
- Island Chain Strategy
  - First island chain
- East Asian foreign policy of the Barack Obama administration
- Nicaragua v. United States
- Mauritius v. United Kingdom
- List of irredentist claims or disputes
