= Our Youth in Taiwan =

Taiwanese documentary directed by Fu Yue

Our Youth in Taiwan is a Taiwanese documentary film directed by Fu Yue, released on April 12, 2019.

== Synopsis ==
The film explores the Sunflower Student Movement and other social and political movements in Taiwan. It focuses on the stories of Chen Wei-ting, a leader of the student movement, and Cai Boyi, a Chinese student studying in Taiwan. The director also serves as the narrator and appears on camera as one of the documented individuals. The film received accolades such as Best Documentary at the 20th Taipei Film Awards and Best Documentary at the 55th Golden Horse Awards, and it was also nominated for Best Editing at the 55th Golden Horse Awards.

== Screening ==
=== Taiwan ===
On April 10, 2019, the film had its Taiwan premiere on the anniversary of the conclusion of the Sunflower Student Movement. The director Kevin H.J. Lee, lawyer Chiu Hsien-chih, and Yang Da-zheng, the lead singer of the band Fire EX. attended the event. Fu delivered a speech with emotion, even shedding tears.

=== Oversea ===
On May 22, 2019, the film was screened at the hearing room of the House Foreign Affairs Committee in the Rayburn House Office Building on Capitol Hill in the United States. Attendees included Minister of Culture Cheng Li-chun, Steve Chabot, former senior official responsible for the Asia-Pacific Economic Cooperation (APEC) at the U.S. Department of State Robert Wang, and Shelley Rigger, East Asian politics professor at Davidson College in North Carolina.

== Dispute ==
During the awards ceremony, Chinese director Zhang Yimou, invited to present the Best New Director award, stated, "The works of so many young directors represent the hope of Chinese cinema!" This remark sparked dissatisfaction among many Taiwanese netizens. When Fu Yue, won the Best Documentary and took the stage to deliver her acceptance speech, she expressed, "I hope our country can be recognized as a truly independent entity. It is the greatest wish for me as a Taiwanese." The audience responded with enthusiastic applause. This statement, perceived as leaning towards Taiwanese independence, stirred various discussions.

In a notable moment, the previous Best Actor winner, Tu Men, presented the award for Best Actress and said, "I am especially honored to once again be at the 'China Taiwan' Golden Horse Awards. I feel the kinship between the two sides," prompting applause from the audience. This was seen by the media as a response to Fu Yue. During the presentation of the Best Feature Film award, Gong Li, originally planned to present with Ang Lee, did not take the stage. When Ang Lee went on stage alone, he asked, "Gong Li, won't you come up and present the award with me? Do you prefer sitting with your comrades?" Gong Li only smiled in response.
