= MOOOV Film Festival =

International film festival in Belgium

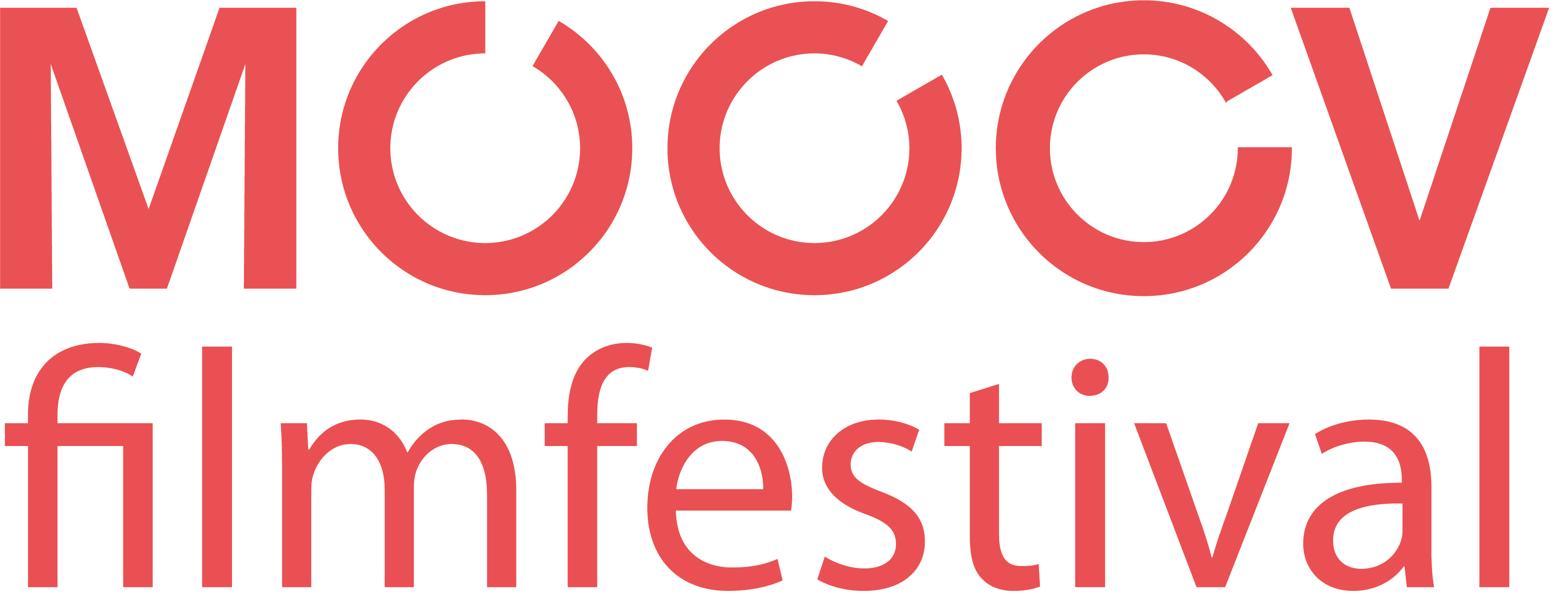
- Location: Flanders, Belgium
- Established: 2013
- Website: www.mooov.be

MOOOV Film Festival is an annual film festival which is held yearly in six locations in Flanders, Belgium. Turnhout and Bruges are the main sites and there are additional screenings in Lier, Sint-Niklaas, Beringen and Roeselare. The film festival started in 2013 as a result of the merger of Open Doek film festival in Turnhout and Cinema Novo in Bruges.

The festival showcases world cinema, narrative film and documentary film. Although the selection of films is diverse in origin, the festival sometimes dedicates special sections of their program to a specific country or region. For example, the 2001 edition had a focus on Iranian cinema and featured 10 award winning films from the country.

== Prizes ==
The festival awards several prizes. The main competition is for the Canvas Award which is judged by a professional jury. The Behind The Scenes Award is judged by a jury of inmates from the Merksplas jail. A jury of students awards the University of Antwerp Award. Additionally, there is a Youth Award.

MOOOV is an ambassador of the Sustainable Development Goals of the United Nations and tries to highlight movies from the Global South.
