= Fu Meng-po =

Taiwanese actor

- 傅孟柏
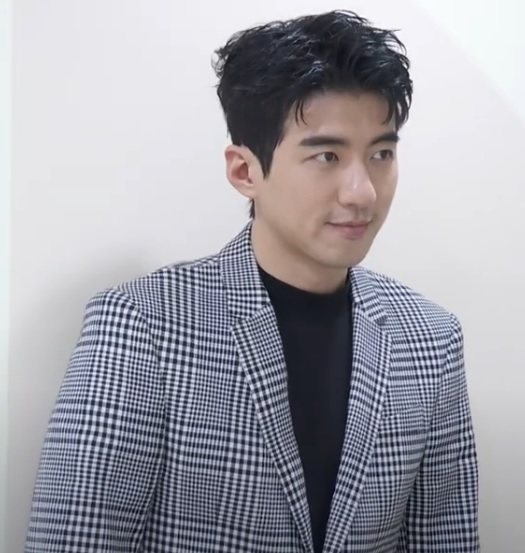
- Fu in May 2022
- Born: May 13, 1987 (age 39); Taiwan
- Other name: Fu Mengbo
- Education: Taipei National University of the Arts
- Occupation: Actor
- Years active: 2011–present

Chinese name
- Traditional Chinese: 傅孟柏
- Simplified Chinese: 傅孟柏
Transcriptions
Standard Mandarin
- Hanyu Pinyin: Fù Mèng Bó
Southern Min
- Hokkien POJ: Pò͘ Bēng-pek

Fu Meng-po (Chinese: 傅孟柏; Pe̍h-ōe-jī: Pò͘ Bēng-pek; born May 13, 1987) is a Taiwanese actor. He is best known for his roles in the romance films Your Love Song (2020) and I Missed You (2021), as well as the period series The Sleuth of the Ming Dynasty (2020). He has also appeared in the drama film Father to Son (2018) and in the horror film Detention (2019), with the former scoring him a Best New Performer nomination at the 55th Golden Horse Awards.

== Filmography ==
=== Television series ===
Year	English title	Original title	Role	Notes/Ref.
2012	The Late Night Stop	小站	Wen Han-tian	
2012	Fireworks	學生劇展－煙火	Zhi-kai	
2012	The Will to Power	權力過程	Secretary to Mayor	
2013	Amour et Pâtisserie	沒有名字的甜點店	Food blogger	
2013	Kiss Me Mom!	媽，親一下！	Hansen	
2015	Ba Ji Teenagers	一代新兵之八極少年	Hu Kai-chuan	
2016	Rock Records in Love	滾石愛情故事－飄洋過海來看你	Chien-heng	Chapter: "I Came Over the Ocean to See You"
2018	Love's Lies	真愛的謊言之破冰者	Shaoyang	
2019	My Mowgli Boy	我的莫格利男孩	Lu Zi-yue	
2020	The Sleuth of the Ming Dynasty	成化十四年	Sui Zhou	
2021	Road to Rebirth	愛在星空下	Qi Yue	
2021	The Love's Outlet	愛的奧特萊斯	Paul	
2021	Rainless Love in a Godless Land	無神之地不下雨	Orad / Kakarayan	
2022	Gourmet Affairs	美食無間		
2022	Taiwan Crime Stories	台灣犯罪故事－黑潮之下	Cheung Ming-jie	
2024	Trade War	商魂	Lin Deng	
2025	The Resurrected	回魂計		Netflix
TBA	The Devil of the Helll	傅孟柏	Chang Ji Yue	

=== Film ===
Year	English title	Original title	Role	Notes
2007	Night Lodge	夜宿		Short film
2008	Sniper	狙擊手	Tai Ke	Short film
2009	First Time	第一次		Short film
2010	The Ninth Lesson	第九堂課		Short film
2011	Check	—N/a	Photocopy shop guy	Short film
2012	Do you, Andy?	Do You, Andy... 你願意了嗎?	Jeffrey	Short film
2012	Chanel -The Little Black Jacket	—N/a	Photographer	Short film
2012	Hello How Are You	Hello妳好嗎	Man on phone	Short film
2012	Library	—N/a	Niao-niao	Short film
2012	Let's Twist Again	—N/a	Zhuo Yun-hao	Short film
2013	This Rain	這一場雨	Guy on bike	Short film
2013	Catch the Happiness?	幸福追不追？	Po	Short film
2014	Slow Running	慢跑之中	Sen	Short film
2014	Twa-Tiu-Tiann	大稻埕	Cultural society member	Cameo
2015	Flash Light	一瞬之光	Da-yan	Short film
2016	Some Rain Must Fall	梅雨季	Man	Short film
2016	My Egg Boy	我的蛋男情人	Restaurant crew	Cameo
2016	The Cat in the Closet	衣櫃裡的貓	Fan Chun-wei	Television
2017	The Last Verse	最後的詩句	Shih Ren-jie	Television
2018	Let's Catch A Movie?	要不要一起去 看電影？	Meng-po	Short film
2018	Father to Son	范保德	Fan Ta-chi	
2018	Piano Lesson	鋼琴課	Pianist	Short film
2019	Deep Evil	緝魔	Kao Chun-wei	
2019	Detention	返校	Chang Ming-hui	
2020	Your Love Song	你的情歌	Xing Chi-yuan	
2020	The Perilous Internet Ring	網絡凶鈴	Ma Ming	
2021	I Missed You	我沒有談的那場戀愛	Chao Shu-wei	
2022	Life for Sale	售命	Liang	
TBA	Day Off	本日公休		

=== Variety and reality show ===
Year	English title	Original title	Notes
2020	Action Together	—N/a	YouTube

=== Music video appearances ===
Year	Artist	Song title
2012	Ding Dang	"That's the Way I Am"
2013	Hebe Tien	"You Better Not Think About Me"
2014	Angela Zhang	"Pleasing"
2014	Maffine	"Apple"
2015	JJ Lin	"The Beacon"
2017	Lo Ta-yu	"Guan Yin Shan"
2018	Picks	"Live"
2020	Yo Lee	"If Only You Could Love Me"

== Discography ==
=== Singles ===
Year	Title	Notes
2020	"Action Together"	Co-performer; theme song of Action Together
2020	"Late at Night 夜闌珊"	Co-performer; song from The Sleuth of the Ming Dynasty

== Awards and nominations ==
Year	Award	Category	Nominated work	Result
2016	51st Golden Bell Awards	Best Actor	Ba Ji Teenagers	Nominated
2017	52nd Golden Bell Awards	Best Actor in a Miniseries or Television Film	The Last Verse	Won
2018	55th Golden Horse Awards	Best New Performer	Father to Son	Nominated
2023	25th Taipei Film Festival	Best Supporting Actor	Day Off	Won
