= The Legend of Zelda: Symphony of the Goddesses =

2012–17 concert tour

- Associated album: The Legend of Zelda 25th Anniversary Special Orchestra CD
- Start date: January 10, 2012
- End date: December 31, 2017
- Legs: 3
- Website: www.zelda-symphony.com

The Legend of Zelda: Symphony of the Goddesses was a concert tour featuring music from Nintendo's The Legend of Zelda video game series. Jason Michael Paul Productions, who was licensed by Nintendo to produce and tour the show, hired Jeron Moore to produce the show as well as Composer Chad Seiter to create the music. The tour is named after the Golden Goddesses in the Zelda series.

== Music ==
The name "Symphony of the Goddesses" refers not only to the concert program but also to the four-movement symphony recounting the storylines from several games in The Legend of Zelda series: A Link to the Past, Ocarina of Time, Twilight Princess, and The Wind Waker. The concert also highlighted orchestral renditions of music from other series games, including Link's Awakening, Majora's Mask, Spirit Tracks, Skyward Sword, and Tri Force Heroes.

Conductors of the concerts have included Eímear Noone, Susie Seiter, Amy Andersson. Kelly Corcoran, Kevin Zakresky and Jessica Gethin.

== History ==
We were going to do the 25th Anniversary Symphony in Tokyo, but instead, how about we do it in three different cities and you guys help produce it, and then we'll look at this other thing after that?

— Jeron Moore, producer of Symphony of the Goddesses

In June 2011, at Nintendo's Electronic Entertainment Expo press event, Jason Michael Paul Productions hired composer Chad Seiter and Producer Jeron Moore to create a four-minute overture spanning 25 years of Zelda music accompanied by images from the same period. After this performance, Shigeru Miyamoto of Nintendo announced that an orchestral CD would accompany the release of Skyward Sword, also produced by Jason Michael Paul Productions with Composer Chad Seiter and recorded by Hollywood recording engineer Bruce Botnick. A 25th Anniversary concert series would be performed in Tokyo, Los Angeles, and London. All of the concerts were produced by Jason Michael Paul Productions.

Evolving from the 25th anniversary concert series, "The Legend of Zelda: Symphony of the Goddesses" concert series kicked off in January 2012 in Dallas, and toured the U.S. and Canada.

The second season, known as "Second Quest" (after a feature found in many Zelda games) consisted of concerts in spring, summer, and fall of 2013. The show went on hiatus after its final "Second Quest" performance in San Jose, California, at the San Jose Civic, performed by the Skywalker Ranch Orchestra.

The third season, known as "Master Quest", consisted of worldwide concerts in 2015 and 2016 and achieved the most success of any of the Zelda Symphony tours traveling to over 150 cities. This continued as the production further iterated until its tour concluded in 2018.

== Schedule ==
=== Original season ===
The San Francisco event in March 2012 included over 1000 attendees. The Los Angeles concert in June featured Zelda Williams (daughter of actor Robin Williams) as the emcee. She was named after Princess Zelda, the video game series' titular character. A concert was held in May in Atlanta and was conducted by Susie Seiter.

Date	City	Country	Venue	Conductor
March 28, 2012	San Francisco	United States	Davies Symphony Hall	Eímear Noone
May 12, 2012	Atlanta	United States	Cobb Energy Performing Arts Centre	Susie Seiter
June 6, 2012	Los Angeles	United States	Greek Theatre	Eímear Noone
July 25, 2012	Philadelphia	United States	The Mann Center	Eímear Noone
July 26, 2012	Washington, D.C.	United States	The Filene Center at Wolf Trap National Park	Eímear Noone
September 15, 2012	Toronto	Canada	Sony Centre for the Performing Arts	Eímear Noone
September 22, 2012	Minneapolis	United States	Orpheum Theatre	Eímear Noone
October 12, 2012	Dallas	United States	AT&T Performing Arts Center	Eímear Noone
October 18, 2012	Boston	United States	Wang Theatre	Eímear Noone
October 25, 2012	Chicago	United States	Chicago Theatre	Eímear Noone
November 6, 2012	Calgary	Canada	Southern Alberta Jubilee Auditorium	Eímear Noone
November 28, 2012	New York City	United States	The Theater at Madison Square Garden	Eímear Noone
December 3, 2012	San Antonio	United States	The Majestic Theatre	Eímear Noone
December 8, 2012	West Palm Beach	United States	Raymond F. Kravis Center for the Performing Arts	Eímear Noone
December 9, 2012	Miami	United States	Adrienne Arsht Center	Eímear Noone
December 14, 2012	San Jose	United States	San Jose Civic Auditorium	Eímear Noone
January 26, 2013	Milwaukee	United States	The Riverside Theatre	

=== Second Quest ===
A concert was held in July 2013 in Baltimore. Concerts were held in August in Newark, New Jersey, September in Seattle, October in Grand Rapids, and December in San Jose, California.

Two concerts were held in Canada: one in Montreal in June and another in Toronto in September. A concert in Mexico City was held in September.

=== Master Quest ===
Symphony of the Goddesses started a worldwide 2015 tour of a third season entitled "Master Quest". "Master Quest" season was extended with performance dates through 2016. The extended concert dates featured music and visuals from Tri Force Heroes for the Nintendo 3DS.

Date	City	Country	Venue	Conductor
January 21, 2015	Nashville	United States	Schermerhorn Symphony Center	
January 22, 2015	Nashville	United States	Schermerhorn Symphony Center	
January 30, 2015	Honolulu	United States	Blaisdell Concert Hall	
February 7, 2015	Tokyo	Japan	Tokyo International Forum	Taizo Takemoto
February 27, 2015	Boston	United States	Symphony Hall	Amy Andersson
March 2, 2015	Seattle	United States	Benaroya Hall	Amy Andersson
March 6, 2015	Monterrey	Mexico	Arena Monterrey	Amy Andersson
March 8, 2015	Mexico City	Mexico	Arena de Ciudad	Amy Andersson
March 20, 2015	Toronto	Canada	Sony Center PAC	Amy Andersson
April 16, 2015	Stockholm	Sweden	Ericsson Globe	Amy Andersson
April 17, 2015	London	United Kingdom	SSE/Wembley Arena	Amy Andersson
April 19, 2015	Düsseldorf	Germany	Mitsubishi Electric Hall	Amy Andersson
April 20, 2015	Munich	Germany	Olympiahalle	Amy Andersson
April 23, 2015	Paris	France	Palais des Congrès	Amy Andersson
April 24, 2015	Milan	Italy	Teatro degli Arcimboldi	Amy Andersson
April 30, 2015	Atlanta	United States	Cobb Energy Center	
May 3, 2015	Miami	United States	James L Knight Center	
May 20, 2015	Edmonton	Canada	Northern Jubilee Hall	Amy Andersson
May 22, 2015	Vancouver	Canada	Queen Elizabeth Theater	Amy Andersson
May 23, 2015	Calgary	Canada	Southern Jubilee Hall	Amy Andersson
May 30, 2015	Montreal	Canada	Place des Arts	Amy Andersson
June 10, 2015	Las Vegas	United States	The Venetian	
June 14, 2015	Los Angeles	United States	Walt Disney Concert Hall	Amy Andersson
June 20, 2015	Austin	United States	The Long Center PAC	
July 11, 2015	San Diego	United States	Copley Symphony Hall	Amy Andersson
July 18, 2015	Orlando	United States	Dr. Phillips Center	
August 28, 2015	Charlottesville	United States	John Paul Jones Arena	Amy Andersson
August 29, 2015	San Francisco	United States	Davies Symphony Hall	
September 10, 2015	Durham	United States	Durham Performing Arts Center	
September 11, 2015	St. Louis	United States	Powell Hall	Amy Andersson
September 12, 2015	St. Louis	United States	Powell Hall	Amy Andersson
September 13, 2015	St. Louis	United States	Powell Hall	Amy Andersson
September 16, 2015	Washington, D.C.	United States	Music Center at Strathmore	Amy Andersson
September 18, 2015	Philadelphia	United States	Mann Center	Amy Andersson
September 25, 2015	Providence	United States	Providence Performing Arts Center	Amy Andersson
October 1, 2015	Chicago	United States	Auditorium Theatre	Amy Andersson
October 2, 2015	Indianapolis	United States	Old National Center	Amy Andersson
October 3, 2015	Milwaukee	United States	Milwaukee Theatre	Amy Andersson
October 13, 2015	New York City	United States	Barclays Center	Amy Andersson
October 15, 2015	Salt Lake City	United States	Abravanel Hall	Amy Andersson
October 18, 2015	Columbus	United States	Ohio Theater	Amy Andersson
October 21, 2015	Houston	United States	Jones Hall	Amy Andersson
October 22, 2015	Houston	United States	Jones Hall	Amy Andersson
October 24, 2015	Dallas	United States	Music Hall at Fair Park	Eímear Noone
October 25, 2015	Portland	United States	Keller Auditorium	
November 8, 2015	Hamburg	Germany	O2 World	Amy Andersson
November 11, 2015	Amsterdam	Netherlands	Heineken Music Hall	Amy Andersson
November 12, 2015	Brussels	Belgium	Palais 12	Amy Andersson
November 13, 2015	Madrid	Spain	Palacio Vista Alegre	Amy Andersson
November 14, 2015	Barcelona	Spain	Auditori Forum	Amy Andersson
November 15, 2015	Rome	Italy	Auditorium Conciliazione	Amy Andersson
November 21, 2015	Zürich	Switzerland	Hallenstadion	Amy Andersson
November 22, 2015	Dublin	Ireland	Convention Centre	Amy Andersson
December 5, 2015	San Jose	United States	City National Civic	Amy Andersson
January 21, 2016	Nashville	United States	Schermerhorn Symphony Center	Amy Andersson
January 22, 2016	Nashville	United States	Schermerhorn Symphony Center	Amy Andersson
February 23, 2016	Boston	United States	Symphony Hall	Amy Andersson
March 8, 2016	Costa Mesa	United States	Segerstrom Center for the Arts	Amy Andersson
March 19, 2016	Toronto	Canada	Sony Centre	Amy Andersson
March 24, 2016	Jacksonville	United States	Moran Theatre	Amy Andersson
March 26, 2016 †	Kansas City	United States	Music Hall Kansas City	Amy Andersson
March 31, 2016	Memphis	United States	The Orpheum	Amy Andersson
April 1, 2016	New Orleans	United States	Saenger Theater	Amy Andersson
April 3, 2016	Columbus	United States	Ohio Theater	Amy Andersson
April 8, 2016	Charlottesville	United States	John Paul Jones Area	Amy Andersson
April 16, 2016	Miami	United States	Arsht Center	Amy Andersson
April 23, 2016	London	United Kingdom	SSE/Wembley Arena	Amy Andersson
May 7, 2016 †	Santiago	Chile	Theater Cariola	Amy Andersson
May 11, 2016	Guadalajara	Mexico	Teatro Diana	Amy Andersson
May 13, 2016	Monterrey	Mexico	Arena Monterrey	Amy Andersson
May 15, 2016	Mexico City	Mexico	Arena de Ciudad	Amy Andersson
May 20, 2016	Nashville	United States	Schermerhorn Symphony Center	Amy Andersson
May 21, 2016	San Antonio	United States	Majestic Theater	Amy Andersson
June 13, 2016	Los Angeles	United States	Dolby Theatre	Amy Andersson
June 23, 2016	Austin	United States	Long Center	Amy Andersson
June 25, 2016	Montreal	Canada	Place des Arts	Amy Andersson
July 14, 2016	Denver	United States	Boettcher Concert Hall	Amy Andersson
July 22, 2016	San Diego	United States	Copley Symphony Hall	Amy Andersson
August 6, 2016	Orlando	United States	Walt Disney Theater	Amy Andersson
August 21, 2016	San Francisco	United States	Davies Symphony Hall	Amy Andersson
September 10, 2016	Atlanta	United States	Cobb Performing Arts Center	Amy Andersson
September 14, 2016	Seattle	United States	Benaroya Hall	Amy Andersson
September 17, 2016	Portland	United States	Arlene Schnitzer Concert Hall	Amy Andersson
September 21, 2016	Edmonton	Canada	Northern Jubilee Hall	Amy Andersson
September 22, 2016	Calgary	Canada	Jack Singer Concert Hall	Amy Andersson
September 23, 2016	Vancouver	Canada	Queen Elizabeth Theatre	Amy Andersson
September 25, 2016	Philadelphia	United States	The Mann Center	Amy Andersson
September 29, 2016	Amsterdam	Netherlands	Heineken Music Hall	Giacomo Loprieno
September 30, 2016	Milan	Italy	Arcimboldi	Giacomo Loprieno
October 1, 2016	Zürich	Switzerland	Hallenstadion	Giacomo Loprieno
October 2, 2016	Stuttgart	Germany	Porsche Arena	Giacomo Loprieno
October 5, 2016	Vienna	Austria	Stadthalle	Giacomo Loprieno
October 7, 2016	Geneva	Switzerland	Geneva Arena	Giacomo Loprieno
October 8, 2016	Paris	France	Palais des Congrès	Giacomo Loprieno
October 9, 2016	Birmingham	United Kingdom	Symphony Hall	
October 12, 2016	Antwerp	Belgium	Stadsschouwburg Antwerp	
October 13, 2016	Manchester	United Kingdom	Bridgewater Hall	
October 14, 2016	Lisbon	Portugal	Coliseu de Lisboa	
October 15, 2016	Essen	Germany	Grugahalle	Giacomo Loprieno
October 19, 2016	Stockholm	Sweden	Stockholm Globe	
October 20, 2016	Glasgow	United Kingdom	Clyde Auditorium	
October 21, 2016	Berlin	Germany	Tempodrom	
October 22, 2016	Warsaw	Poland	Torwar Hall	
October 23, 2016	Prague	Czech Republic	Forum Karlin	
October 28, 2016	Barcelona	Spain	Auditori Forum	Giacomo Loprieno
October 29, 2016	Madrid	Spain	Palacio Vistalegre	Giacomo Loprieno
October 30, 2016	Bilbao	Spain	Palacio Euskalduna	Giacomo Loprieno
November 5, 2016	Washington, D.C.	United States	Warner Theater	
November 10, 2016	Louisville	United States	Whitney Hall	
November 11, 2016	Rochester	United States	Kodak Hall	
November 12, 2016	Chicago	United States	Chicago Auditorium	
November 13, 2016	Newark	United States	NJPAC	
November 17, 2016	Charleston	United States	NCPAC	
November 18, 2016	Houston	United States	Revention Center	
November 19, 2016	Milwaukee	United States	Riverside Theater	
November 20, 2016	Fresno	United States	Saroyan Theatre	
November 21, 2016	Phoenix	United States	Kodak Hall	
December 4, 2016	Salt Lake City	United States	Abravanel Hall	
December 10, 2016	San Jose	United States	City National Civic	
December 16, 2016	St. Petersburg	United States	Mahaffey Theater	
January 7, 2017	Fort Worth	United States	Bass Performance Hall	
January 13, 2017	Honolulu	United States	Blaisdell Concert Hall	
January 21, 2017	Oklahoma City	United States	Civic Center Music Hall	

† Multiple performances held the same day.

=== Zelda Symphony of the Goddesses ===
Symphony of the Goddesses started a new 2017 worldwide tour season. The five-movement symphony featured an all new movement from Skyward Sword, a much-anticipated arrangement from Breath of the Wild, and a reimagined score including music from A Link Between Worlds, Twilight Princess, the remake of Majora's Mask, Ocarina of Time, A Link to the Past, and more.

Date	City	Country	Venue
July 22, 2017	Washington, D.C.	United States	The Filene Center at Wolf Trap National Park
September 9, 2017	Quebec City	Canada	Grand Theatre de Quebec
September 15, 2017	Toronto	Canada	Sony Centre
September 22, 2017	Seattle	United States	Paramount Theatre
September 23, 2017	Portland	United States	Keller Auditorium
September 30, 2017	Los Angeles	United States	Dolby Theatre
October 6, 2017	Kansas City	United States	Kansas City Music Hall
October 7, 2017	Memphis	United States	Orpheum Theatre
October 8, 2017	Des Moines	United States	Des Moines Civic Center
October 20, 2017	New York City	United States	United Palace Theatre
October 21, 2017	Boston	United States	Wang Theatre
October 27, 2017	San Antonio	United States	Majestic Theatre
October 29, 2017	Sydney	Australia	Sydney Opera House
November 1, 2017	Detroit	United States	Orchestra Hall
November 3, 2017	Baltimore	United States	Lyric Theatre @ Model PAC
November 4, 2017	Cleveland	United States	State Theatre
November 5, 2017	Columbus	United States	Ohio Theatre
November 6, 2017	Phoenix	United States	Phoenix Symphony Hall
November 10, 2017	Durham	United States	DPAC
November 11, 2017	Norfolk	United States	Chrysler Hall
November 13, 2017	Monterrey	Mexico	Auditorio Pabellón
November 16, 2017	Atlanta, GA	United States	Cobb Energy PAC
November 17, 2017	Knoxville	United States	Knoxville Civic Auditorium
November 18, 2017	Chicago	United States	Chicago Auditorium Theatre
November 21, 2017	London	United Kingdom	Eventim Apollo
November 24, 2017	Düsseldorf	Germany	Mitsubishi Electric Halle
November 25, 2017	Barcelona	Spain	Auditori Fòrum – CCIB
November 26, 2017	Florence	Italy	Nelson Mandela Forum
November 30, 2017	Vancouver	Canada	Queen Elizabeth Theatre
December 1, 2017	Edmonton	Canada	Northern Alberta Jubilee Auditorium
December 2, 2017	Calgary	Canada	Southern Alberta Jubilee Auditorium
December 3, 2017	Milwaukee	United States	Riverside Theater
December 8, 2017	Montreal	Canada	Place des Arts
December 9, 2017	San Jose	United States	City National Civic
December 11, 2017	Dublin	Ireland	Bord Gáis Energy Theatre
December 14, 2017	Pittsburgh	United States	Heinz Hall
December 15, 2017	New Orleans	United States	Saenger Theatre
December 16, 2017	Miami	United States	The Arsht Center
December 27, 2017	Philadelphia	United States	Kimmel Center
December 29, 2017	Oklahoma City	United States	Civic Center Music Hall
December 30, 2017	Salt Lake City	United States	Abravanel Hall

== Other performances ==
In September 2015, the Nintendo World Store in New York City hosted a Zelda Symphony event, which consisted of a live musical performance by a string quartet from The Legend of Zelda: Symphony of the Goddesses, an ocarina demo by David Ramos (a.k.a. DocJazz), photo opportunities of cosplaying fans, and Zelda Symphony merchandise. Executive producer Jason Michael Paul, Associate Producer Jacob Battersby and conductor Amy Andersson were also in attendance.

On October 13, The Late Show with Stephen Colbert hosted, as its musical guest, a performance from The Legend of Zelda: Symphony of the Goddesses (with conductor Amy Andersson) to promote the tour dates as well as the release of Tri Force Heroes.

== Reception ==
The series has been well received by the video game press. Writing for The Tech, Jessica Pourian said the silent nature of series protagonist Link worked well with the video displayed during the concert, helping to immerse the audience more than with video game concerts where dialogue is included. She noted extraordinary applause for the concert. She said she left the event wanting to go back and play Zelda games.

Tony Ponce of Destructoid found the music "awe-inspiring", "pure magic", and "as rich and as varied as the games themselves", while expressing a desire to hear some of the music cut from the performance.

Wired noted "many truly breathtaking moments" during the concert, saying the concert highlighted key moments in the music of the series. Wired said people need not even know the series well to enjoy the concert. Wired did complain of "dreadful live camerawork" and noted that the crowd was not particularly reserved.

Stephen Totilo of Kotaku was less enthusiastic about the concert, saying he liked it but did not love it, and criticized the triple-encore structure and the emphasis on battle themes, saying he thought the series was more about adventure than combat.
