= 32nd Golden Rooster Awards =

2019 Chinese film awards

- Poster
- Date: November 23, 2019
- Site: Xiamen International Conference & Exhibition Center; Xiamen, China
- Organized by: China Film Association

Highlights
- Best Feature Film: The Wandering Earth
- Best Direction: Dante Lam; Operation Red Sea
- Best Actor: Wang Jingchun; So Long, My Son
- Best Actress: Yong Mei; So Long, My Son
- Most awards: So Long, My Son (3)
- Most nominations: Dying to Survive (8)

Television coverage
- Network: CCTV

The 32nd Golden Rooster Awards honoring best Chinese language films which presented during 2018–19. The award ceremony was held in Xiamen, China, and broadcast by CCTV.

== Schedule ==
Time	Event
22/10/2019	Announced the nominees
19/11/2019	Nominee Ceremony
23/11/2019	Award Ceremony

== Winners and nominees ==
Best Picture	Best Director
The Wandering Earth; Dying to Survive; So Long, My Son; Us and Them; Operation Red Sea; The Bugle from Gutian	Dante Lam–Operation Red Sea; Frant Gwo–The Wandering Earth; Huo Meng–Crossing The Border-Zhaoguan; Wang Xiaoshuai–So Long, My Son; Dong Yue–The Looming Storm; Lü Yue–Lost, Found
Best Directorial Debut	Best Low-budget Feature
Wen Muye–Dying to Survive; Rene Liu–Us and Them; Lina Wong–A First Farewell; Li Peng–Find My Way Home; Teng Congcong–Send Me to the Clouds	Red Flowers and Green Leaves; Crossing The Border-Zhaoguan; To Live to Sing; Dwelling in the Fuchun Mountains; If You Are Happy
Best Writing	Best Editing
Wang Xiaoshuai and Mei Ah–So Long, My Son; Wen Muye, Han Jianü and Zhong Wei –Dying to Survive; Teng Congcong–Send Me to the Clouds; Jingzhi Zou–Enter the Forbidden City; Yuan Yuan, He Yuming, Pan Wei, An Zhen, Liu Ruoying–Us and Them; Bao Jingjing–Our Shining Days	Zhu Liyun–Enter the Forbidden City; Zhu Lin–Dying to Survive; Chi-Leung Kwong, Huie Ling Peh and Ran Wang–Our Shining Days; Li Dianshi–Legend of the Demon Cat; Yuxia Bai, Yukun Tan–Pegasus; Liao Ching-sung, Fang Wu–Find My Way Home
Best Actor	Best Actress
Wang Jingchun–So Long, My Son; Xu Zheng–Dying to Survive; Tu Men–Old Beast; Duan Yihong–The Looming Storm; Fu Dalong–Enter the Forbidden City; Taiyi Yang –Crossing The Border-ZhaoGuan	Yong Mei–So Long, My Son; Bai Baihe–A City Called Macau; Zhou Dongyu–Us and Them; Zhao Xiaoli–To Live to Sing; Ma Yili–Lost, Found; Yao Chen–Send Me to the Clouds
Best Supporting Actor	Best Supporting Actress
Wang Zhifei–The Bugle from Gutian; Zhang Yu–Dying to Survive; Eric Wang–Dying to Survive; Tian Zhuangzhuang–Us and Them; Li Yunhu–Crossing The Border-ZhaoGuan; Xin Baiqing–Legend of the Demon Cat	Wu Yufang–Send Me to the Clouds; Jiang Luxia–Operation Red Sea; Xu Xing–If You Are Happy; Kalbinur Rahmati–A First Farewell; Tajigul Heilmeier–A First Farewell
Best Cinematography	Best Art Direction
Legend of the Demon Cat–Cao Yu; A First Farewell–Li Yong; Shadow–Zhao Xiaoding; The Wandering Earth–Michael Liu; Fade Away Pastoral–Geritu; A City Called Macau–Zeng Nianping	Legend of the Demon Cat–Lu Wei, Tu Nan; Dying to Survive–Li Miao; The Wandering Earth–Ang Gao; Shadow–Horace Ma; The Looming Storm–Liu Qiang; Animal World–Xiaojie Song
Best Music	Best Sound Recording
The Bugle from Gutian–Ju Wenpei; Dwelling in the Fuchun Mountains–Dou Wei; Enter the Forbidden City–Nan Shu; You'll Never Walk Alone–Ye Zou; Sitting on the train to Beijing–Sijun Liu; The Compassion in Between–Xia Guan, Fan Yang	The Wandering Earth–Zhu Yan-Feng, Danrong Wang, Xu Liu; Legend of the Demon Cat–Jia Liu; The Bugle from Gutian–Chenggang Ji, Yingang Wang; The Looming Storm–Emma Long, Rocky Zhang; Animal World–Gang Wang, Xiaosha Liu; Pegasus–Ming Guo
Best Animated Feature	Best Children's Film
The Wind Guardians; Back Home of C9; New Happy Dad and Son 3: Adventure in Russia; White Snake; Boonie Bears: Blast into the Past; Sharp the Bull	Find My Way Home; The Home in the Tree; You’ll Never Walk Alone; Running Like the Wind; Sitting on the train to Beijing
Best Chinese Opera Film	Best Documentary
The Woman of the Mountain; Guiying Mu Takes Command; Cao Cao and Yang Xiu; Buyi Women; White·Snake	Striving for Dream; Hello, Beijing; Kick the Ball! Kid!; The memory of the drama - Mulan; Marx; Tibetan King's Baby Diary - Polar Tracking
Lifetime Achievement Award
Wang Tiecheng; Yang Zaibao; Xu Huanshan
