= Makoto Shinkai's Disaster Trilogy =

Coming-of-age fantasy anime film trilogy

Disaster Trilogy
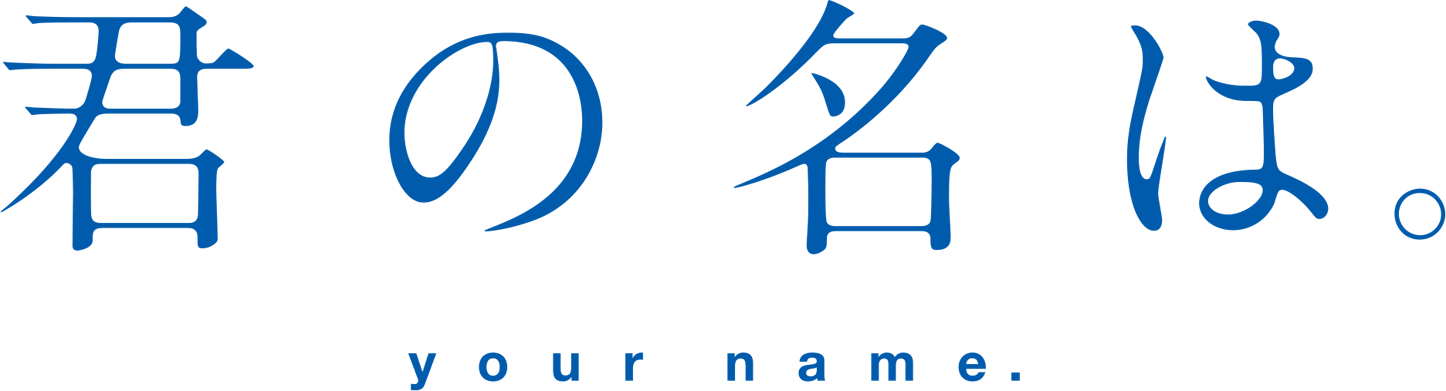
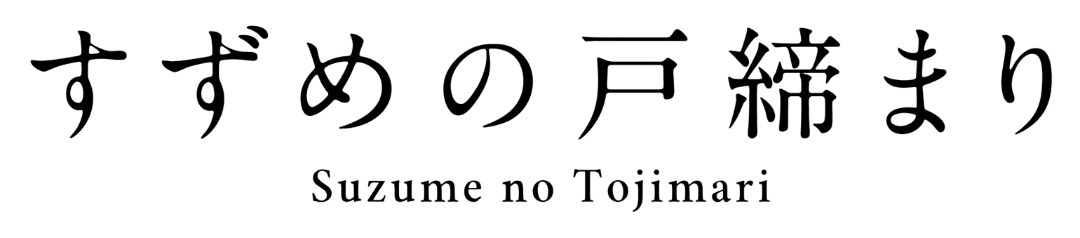
- Directed by: Makoto Shinkai
- Written by: Makoto Shinkai
- Produced by: Kōichirō Itō (YN, S); Kinue Itō (WY, S); Wakana Okamura (WY, S)
- Starring: Ryunosuke Kamiki; Kana Hanazawa
- Edited by: Makoto Shinkai
- Music by: Radwimps
- Production companies: CoMix Wave Films; Story Inc. (WY, S)
- Distributed by: Toho
- Release dates: 3 July 2016 (YN); 19 July 2019 (WY); 11 November 2022 (S)
- Running time: 107 minutes (YN); 112 minutes (WY); 122 minutes (S)
- Country: Japan
- Language: Japanese
- Box office: $923 million (3 films)

The Disaster Trilogy (known as Makoto Shinkai's Disaster Trilogy) (Note: Japanese: 新海誠氏の災害を扱った3部作) is a film trilogy consisting of three coming-of-age fantasy anime films, which are thematically related to natural disasters set primarily in Japan, written and directed by Makoto Shinkai and produced with CoMix Wave Films:

1. Your Name (Note: Sometimes stylized as Your Name. or your name.) (Japanese: 君の名は。, Hepburn: Kimi no Na wa; lit. 'Your Name is...') (2016)
2. Weathering with You (Japanese: 天気の子, Hepburn: Tenki no Ko; lit. 'Child of Weather') (2019)
3. Suzume (Japanese: すずめの戸締まり, Hepburn: Suzume no Tojimari; lit. 'Suzume's Locking Up') (2022)

Their central themes drew inspiration from the frequency of natural disasters in Japan, dealing with certain elements of love, personal growth, sacrifice, and the passage of time.

Despite being referred to as a trilogy, due to the similar theme, director, and style, the characters in each film are different (with the exception of cameos), and Your Name and Weathering with You are set in the same universe, while Suzume is set differently. Furthermore, the first two of the trilogy were directly connected by Shinkai's 2013 opposite mid-length film The Garden of Words (言の葉の庭, Kotonoha no Niwa), which served as a precursor to the trilogy, via cameos of previous characters. The first film in the trilogy premiered at the 2016 Anime Expo in Los Angeles on 3 July 2016, and eventually released in Japan on 26 August 2016; the last two were theatrically released in Japan on 19 July 2019 and 7–11 November 2022, respectively.

The Disaster Trilogy received widespread critical acclaim from critics and audiences, with particular praise for its story, animation, music, visuals, and emotional weight. The trilogy was a massive commercial success, with each film in it being among the fifteen highest-grossing Japanese animated feature films, and Your Name becoming the third highest-grossing film on the list. It also received numerous accolades, including two Crunchyroll Anime Awards for Film of the Year to Your Name and Suzume, and six Japan Academy Film Prizes, in addition of nominations to thirteen Annie Awards and one Golden Globe Award. All of the films were adapted to novel and manga.

== Premises ==
=== Your Name (2016) ===
Your Name follows the story of high school students Taki Tachibana and Mitsuha Miyamizu, who suddenly begin to swap bodies despite having never met, unleashing chaos onto each other's lives.

=== Weathering with You (2019) ===
Weathering with You follows a 16-year-old high school boy, Hodaka Morishima, who runs away from his troubled rural home to Tokyo, and later befriends Hina Amano, an orphaned girl who has the ability to control the weather.

=== Suzume (2022) ===
Suzume follows 17-year-old high school girl Suzume Iwato and young stranger Souta Munakata, who team up to prevent a series of disasters across Japan by sealing doors from the colossal, supernatural worm that causes earthquakes after being released.

== Characters ==
=== Main characters ===
Name	Your Name	Weathering with You	Suzume
Taki Tachibana (立花 瀧, Tachibana Taki) (Note: The kanji for "Taki" combines the characters for "water" and "dragon." The surname "Tachibana" means "standing flower.")	Yes (Note: Cameo only in Weathering with You.)		No
Mitsuha Miyamizu (宮水 三葉, Miyamizu Mitsuha) (Note: The name "Mitsuha" literally translates to "three leaves." She was named as such by her parents (in the film, her mother; in the light novel, her father) in line with the nomenclaturial tradition of her grandmother and mother. From Hitoha onward, the Miyamizus are named via "leaves," with which a number (in the kun reading) denotes the ordinality of their geniture: "Hitoha" = one leaf; "Futaba" = two leaves; "Mitsuha" = three leaves; "Yotsuha" = four leaves. The surname "Miyamizu" translates to "shrine-water.")	Yes		No
Hodaka Morishima (森嶋 帆高, Morishima Hodaka)	No	Yes	No
Hina Amano (天野 陽菜, Amano Hina)	No	Yes	No
Suzume Iwato (岩戸 鈴芽, Iwato Suzume)	No	No	Yes
Souta Munakata (宗像 草太, Munakata Sōta)	No	No	Yes

Characters from Your Name appeared as cameos in Weathering with You: Taki Tachibana, Mitsuha Miyamizu, Katsuhiko "Tessie" Teshigawara, Sayaka Natori, and Yotsuha Miyamizu.

Two main characters from the precursor film The Garden of Words appeared in Your Name as cameo roles: Yukari Yukino (雪野 百香里, Yukino Yukari) appears in a cameo role as a teacher in Your Name, and Takao Akizuki (秋月 孝雄, Akizuki Takao), the protagonist of the film, also appears as a silent cameo appearance, albeit for a few frames.

=== Voice cast ===
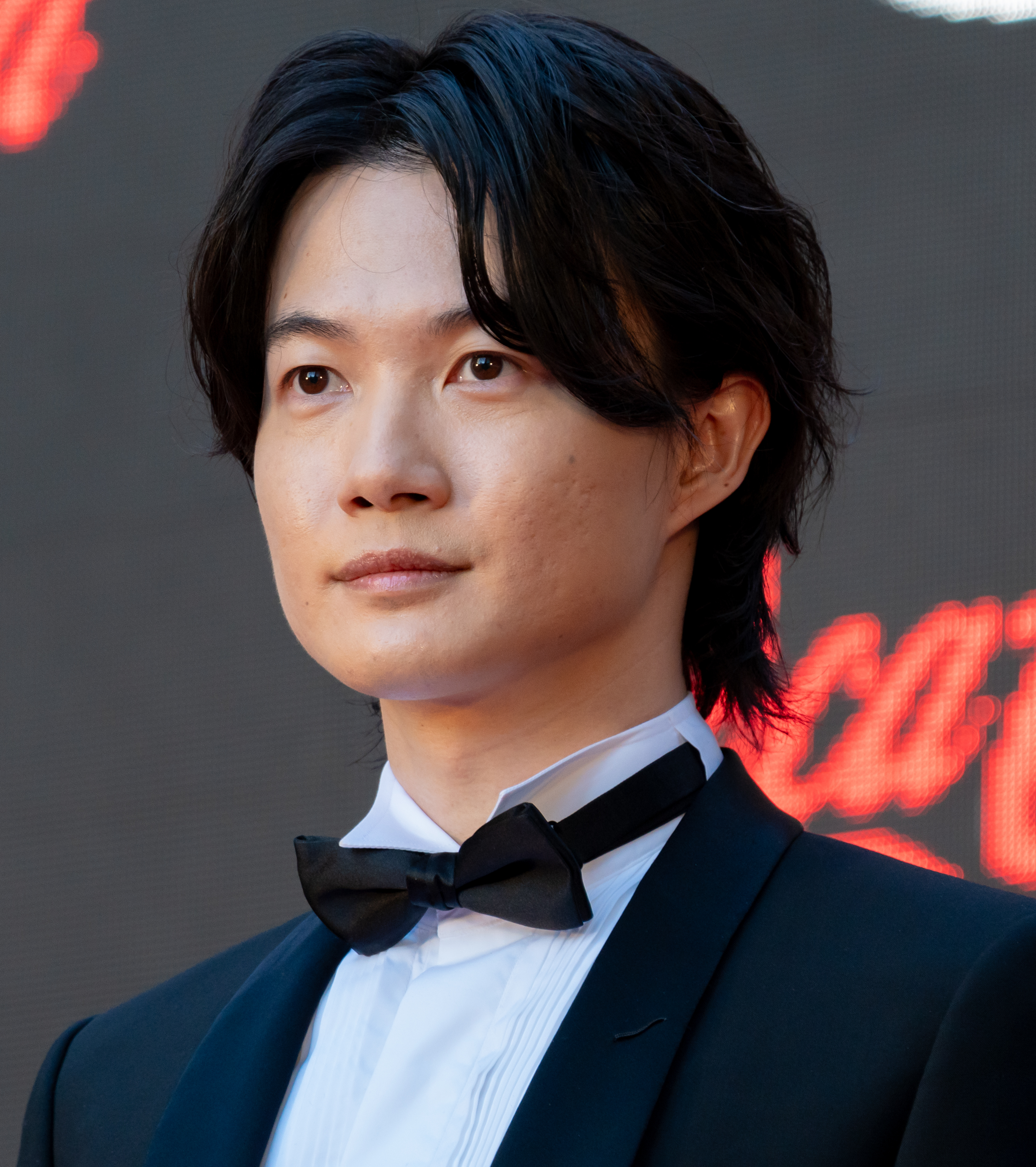
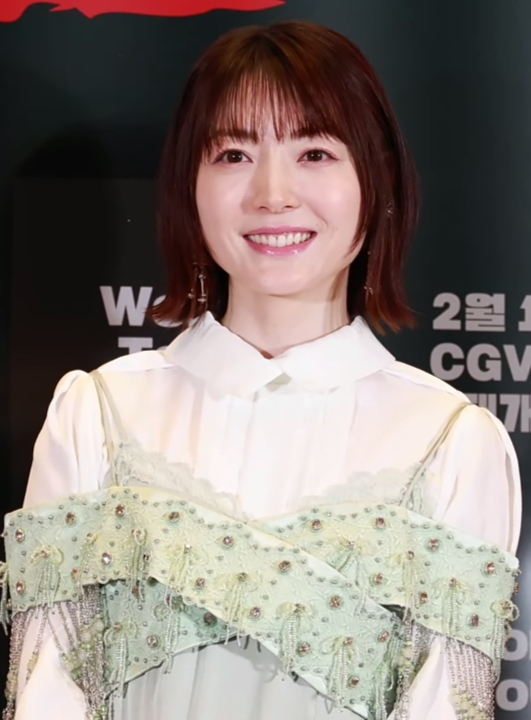
Ryunosuke Kamiki and Kana Hanazawa are the only voice actors to appear all three films in different roles.
- Ryunosuke Kamiki as Taki Tachibana (立花 瀧, Tachibana Taki) in Your Name and Weathering with You, and Tomoya Serizawa (芹澤 朋也, Serizawa Tomoya) in Suzume.
- Kana Hanazawa as Yukari Yukino (雪野 百香里, Yukino Yukari) in Your Name, Kana (カナ, Kana) in Weathering with You, and Tsubame Iwato (岩戸 椿芽, Iwato Tsubame) in Suzume.
- Mone Kamishiraishi as Mitsuha Miyamizu (宮水 三葉, Miyamizu Mitsuha) in Your Name and Weathering with You.
- Ryo Narita as Katsuhiko "Tessie" Teshigawara (勅使河原 克彦, Teshigawara Katsuhiko) in Your Name and Weathering with You.
- Aoi Yūki as Sayaka Natori (名取 早耶香, Natori Sayaka) in Your Name and Weathering with You.
- Kanon Tani as Yotsuha Miyamizu (宮水 四葉, Miyamizu Yotsuha) in Your Name and Weathering with You.
- Kotaro Daigo as Hodaka Morishima (森嶋 帆高, Morishima Hodaka) in Weathering with You.
- Nana Mori as Hina Amano (天野 陽菜, Amano Hina) in Weathering with You.
- Nanoka Hara (teenager) and Akari Miura (young) as Suzume Iwato (岩戸 鈴芽, Iwato Suzume) in Suzume.
- Hokuto Matsumura as Souta Munakata (宗像 草太, Munakata Sōta) in Suzume.

== Reception ==
=== Box office ===
Title		Box office gross revenue		Box office admissions	
English	Japanese	Japan	Worldwide	Japan	Worldwide
Your Name	Kimi no Na wa	¥25,170,000,000	$405,340,703	19,300,000	45,178,383 (Note: Your Name box office admissions: Japan – 19,300,000; China – 20,728,000; South Korea – 3,712,891; Europe (excluding Russia and Spain) – 627,384; United States and Canada – 580,000; Russia and Argentina – 169,600; Spain – 60,508)
Weathering with You	Tenki no Ko	¥14,940,000,000	$193,715,360	10,510,000	29,800,000
Suzume	Suzume no Tojimari	¥14,230,000,000	$323,638,107	10,900,000	47,000,000
Total		¥54,340,000,000	$922,694,170	40,710,000	121,978,383

=== Critical response ===
English title	Japanese title	Rotten Tomatoes	RT's critics consensus	Metacritic
Your Name	Kimi no Na wa	98% (118 reviews)	"As beautifully animated as it is emotionally satisfying, Your Name adds another outstanding chapter to writer-director Makoto Shinkai's filmography."	81 (26 reviews)
Weathering with You	Tenki no Ko	92% (98 reviews)	"Beautifully animated and narratively engaging, Weathering with You further establishes writer-director Makoto Shinkai as a singularly talented filmmaker."	72 (30 reviews)
Suzume	Suzume no Tojimari	96% (137 reviews)	"Suzume sees director Makoto Shinkai falling just a bit short of the bar set by previous outings – but when the results are this visually thrilling and emotionally impactful, it's hard to find much fault."	77 (27 reviews)

=== Accolades ===
The Disaster Trilogy received numerous awards and nominations largely for excellence in writing, directing, animation, and composing score. In Japan Academy Film Prize, the three films together won Outstanding Achievement in Music to Radwimps for his composing score, in addition of other films: Your Name won Screenplay of the Year (the first animated film to do so) and a juried Alumni Award for Best Film category, and Weathering with You won Animation of the Year.

The trilogy also received accolades from international award ceremonies including Annie Awards and Crunchyroll Anime Awards, the former received thirteen nominations altogether (but did not win) and the latter received seven nominations, winning Film of the Year twice to Your Name and Suzume, respectively. In Asia Pacific Screen Awards, the trilogy received nominations for each, winning once for Weathering with You.

The trilogy submitted Academy Awards for Best Animated Feature, along with Weathering with You selected as Japan's entry for Best International Feature Film at the 92nd Academy Awards, but they were ultimately not nominated or make the shortlist.

==== Annie Awards ====
Title	Ceremony	Category	Result	Ref.
Your Name	44th (2017)	Best Animated Feature – Independent	Nominated	
Your Name	44th (2017)	Outstanding Achievement for Directing in an Animated Feature Production	Nominated	
Weathering with You	47th (2020)	Best Animated Feature – Independent	Nominated	
Weathering with You	47th (2020)	Outstanding Achievement for Animated Effects in an Animated Production	Nominated	
Weathering with You	47th (2020)	Outstanding Achievement for Directing in an Animated Feature Production	Nominated	
Weathering with You	47th (2020)	Outstanding Achievement for Writing in an Animated Feature Production	Nominated	
Suzume	51st (2024)	Best Animated Feature	Nominated	
Suzume	51st (2024)	Outstanding Achievement for Animated Effects in an Animated Production	Nominated	
Suzume	51st (2024)	Outstanding Achievement for Character Animation in an Animated Feature Production	Nominated	
Suzume	51st (2024)	Outstanding Achievement for Music in an Animated Feature Production	Nominated	
Suzume	51st (2024)	Outstanding Achievement for Storyboarding in an Animated Feature Production	Nominated	
Suzume	51st (2024)	Outstanding Achievement for Voice Acting in an Animated Feature Production	Nominated	
Suzume	51st (2024)	Outstanding Achievement for Writing in an Animated Feature Production	Nominated	

==== Asia Pacific Screen Awards ====
Title	Ceremony	Category	Result	Ref.
Your Name	11th (2017)	Best Animated Film	Nominated	
Weathering with You	13th (2019)	Best Animated Film	Won	
Suzume	16th (2023)	Best Animated Film	Nominated	

==== Crunchyroll Anime Awards ====
Title	Ceremony	Category	Result	Ref.
Your Name	2nd (2018)	Best Film	Won	
Suzume	8th (2024)	Best Film	Won	
Suzume	8th (2024)	Best Anime Song	Nominated	
Suzume	8th (2024)	Best Score	Nominated	
Suzume	8th (2024)	Best Voice Artist Performance (Spanish)	Nominated	
Suzume	8th (2024)	Best Voice Artist Performance (German)	Nominated	
Suzume	8th (2024)	Best Voice Artist Performance (French)	Nominated	

==== Japan Academy Film Prize ====
Title	Ceremony	Category	Result	Ref.
Your Name	40th (2017)	Animation of the Year	Nominated	
Your Name	40th (2017)	Director of the Year	Nominated	
Your Name	40th (2017)	Screenplay of the Year	Won	
Your Name	40th (2017)	Outstanding Achievement in Music	Won	
Your Name	40th (2017)	Alumni Award for Best Film	Won	
Weathering with You	43rd (2020)	Animation of the Year	Won	
Weathering with You	43rd (2020)	Outstanding Achievement in Music	Won	
Suzume	46th (2023)	Outstanding Achievement in Music	Won	
Suzume	46th (2023)	Animation of the Year	Nominated	

==== Satellite Awards ====
Title	Ceremony	Category	Result	Ref.
Your Name	21st (2017)	Best Animated or Mixed Media Feature	Nominated	
Weathering with You	24th (2019)	Best Animated or Mixed Media Feature	Nominated	
Suzume	28th (2024)	Best Animated or Mixed Media Feature	Nominated	

== See also ==
- List of highest-grossing animated films
- List of highest-grossing films in Japan
- List of highest-grossing Japanese films
