= Shadow (2018 film) =

2018 Chinese-Hong Kong film by Zhang Yimou

- Theatrical release poster
- 影
- Directed by: Zhang Yimou
- Screenplay by: Li Wei; Zhang Yimou
- Based on: Jingzhou of the Three Kingdoms by Zhu Sujin
- Produced by: Liu Jun; Catherine Pang; Wang Xiaozhu
- Starring: Deng Chao; Sun Li; Zheng Kai; Wang Qianyuan; Hu Jun; Wang Jingchun; Guan Xiaotong; Leo Wu
- Cinematography: Zhao Xiaoding
- Edited by: Zhou Xiaolin
- Music by: Zai Lao
- Production companies: Tencent Pictures; Perfect; Village Entertainment; Le Vision Pictures
- Distributed by: Well Go USA Entertainment
- Release dates: 6 September 2018 (Venice); 30 September 2018 (China); 17 January 2019 (Hong Kong); 3 May 2019 (America)
- Running time: 116 minutes
- Countries: China; Hong Kong
- Language: Mandarin
- Box office: $91.7 million

Shadow (影; pinyin: Yǐng) is a 2018 wuxia film directed by Zhang Yimou, starring Deng Chao, Sun Li, Zheng Kai, Wang Qianyuan, Hu Jun, Wang Jingchun, Guan Xiaotong, and Leo Wu. A Chinese-Hong Kong co-production, the story is adapted from the play Jingzhou of the Three Kingdoms (三国·荆州) by Zhu Sujin, who also wrote the screenplay for the 2010 television series Three Kingdoms. It was screened at the 75th Venice International Film Festival, the 2018 Toronto International Film Festival, and the 2018 BFI London Film Festival.

It was theatrically released in Hong Kong on 17 January 2019, as well as in Australia, Canada, Ireland, New Zealand, the United Kingdom, and the United States within 2019.

== Plot ==
The film is set in a fictional historical period. Years ago, the Kingdom of Pei lost the strategic Jing Prefecture to the Kingdom of Yan after their general Ziyu lost in a duel to the Yan general Yang Cang. Pei Liang, the King of Pei, is enraged after discovering that Ziyu has challenged Yang Cang to a duel without his authorisation. He demands Ziyu and his wife Xiaoai to perform for him with the guzheng, but Ziyu refuses instead cuts his hair before being allowed to leave. Pei Liang then arranges for his sister Qingping to marry Yang Cang's son Yang Ping to make peace between the two kingdoms.

It is revealed that Ziyu is actually a decoy named Jingzhou; the real Ziyu was severely wounded during the duel and is still recovering in a hidden location. Jingzhou was taken and secretly trained as a "shadow" by Ziyu's uncle after they noticed his uncanny resemblance to Ziyu. Only Ziyu and Xiaoai are aware of this arrangement. Jingzhou serves as Ziyu's decoy after the duel. Ziyu plots to retake Jing Prefecture and needs Jingzhou to help him accomplish this mission. Ziyu promises to let Jingzhou return home after retaking Jing Prefecture.

Pei Liang decides to punish "Ziyu" and demote him to commoner status despite his subjects' objections. Before "Ziyu" leaves, the king demands to see "Ziyu"'s wounds and apply an ointment. When "Ziyu" reveals the wound, the king remarks that the wound looks fresh. "Ziyu" replies that the original wound has healed and this was a fresh cut to remind himself of his loss. When it is reported that Yang Ping has made a counteroffer to take Qingping only as his concubine rather than his wife, the Pei royal court sees it as a snub. However, Pei Liang still accepts it, much to his sister's disgust. Tian Zhan, a Pei general, openly calls the king's decision "spineless" and resigns.

Jingzhou, using a metal umbrella, is unsuccessful in his practice duels against Ziyu, who mimics Yang Cang's guandao technique. Ziyu gets increasingly angry and abusive. Xiaoai suggests that Jingzhou fight with feminine moves and embrace the umbrella's representation of yin, which would serve as a more effective counter to Yang's yang style of fighting. She then demonstrates a countermove to Jingzhou. Later, Jingzhou meets Tian Zhan and instructs him to lead and train 100 convicts that Ziyu had recruited.

Jingzhou brings Tian Zhan to meet Ziyu, who reveals Jingzhou's true identity as his decoy. Ziyu then tells Tian about his plan to send Jingzhou to recapture Jing Prefecture by keeping Yang Cang occupied for three rounds of a duel. After taking Jing Prefecture, Ziyu plans to become the new king while Tian will serve under him. The night before the duel, Jingzhou confesses that he is prepared to do anything for Xiaoai. Xiaoai spends the night with Jingzhou while Ziyu secretly watches them through a peephole.

Jingzhou travels to Jing Prefecture to attend the duel on a floating platform. Below the platform are Tian Zhan and the 100 armed convicts. Tian is shocked to see Qingping among them, who has stowed away on the boat. Tian and the convicts infiltrate Jing Prefecture while Yang Cang and his men are distracted by the duel. Jingzhou beats Yang in the first round but loses in the next two. Yang Cang offers to consider it a draw but Jingzhou refuses and challenges him to continue the duel until one of them dies.

Using the new umbrella weapons, Tian Zhan and the convicts drive back Yang Ping and his soldiers, though both sides suffer heavy losses. Yang Ping guards the banner and duels Qingping, mortally wounding her. Yang Ping asks her why a woman would fight, and when he moves closer to hear her reply, she kills him with a dagger. Tian topples the Yang's banner. Seeing this, an enraged Yang Cang savagely beats up Jingzhou. Just as he is about to deliver the killing blow, Jingzhou strikes the umbrella's blade and makes it snap at Yang Cang, killing him. Having helped Ziyu capture Jing Prefecture, Jingzhou makes his way home, where he finds his mother dead and gets attacked by assassins. However, an emissary from Pei Liang shows up and kills the assassins, saving Jingzhou. Meanwhile, Pei Liang also sends assassins to kill Ziyu.

At the feast to celebrate the victory, Pei Liang abruptly orders everyone to leave except Jingzhou and Xiaoai. He reveals to Jingzhou that he knows that the truth about Jingzhou being a decoy, and wants Jingzhou to marry Xiaoai and fully assume Ziyu's identity. When one of the assassins comes in with a box presumably containing Ziyu's head, the king opens it and sees it is empty. The assassin then stabs Pei Liang and pulls off his mask to reveal himself as Ziyu. Ziyu then orders Jingzhou to kill Pei Liang, saying that the king was the one who ordered the assassins to kill Jingzhou's mother. When Jingzhou reaches for the king's sword, Ziyu attempts to stab Jingzhou, but Jingzhou dodges and mortally wounds Ziyu. Jingzhou then puts Ziyu's mask on and uses Ziyu's sword to kill Pei Liang, putting the sword in Ziyu's hand to frame him for the murder.

Jingzhou exits the hall and declares to the Pei official gathered outside that the king has been assassinated and that he has killed the assassin. Tian Zhan does not object. Xiaoai runs to the doors of the hall in shock and looks out through an opening, undecided on whether to expose Jingzhou or accept what has transpired.

== Cast ==
- Deng Chao as Ziyu (Zhou Yu) / Jingzhou (Lu Xun)
- Sun Li as Xiaoai (Xiaoqiao)
- Zheng Kai as Pei Liang (Sun Quan)
- Wang Qianyuan as Tian Zhan (Lü Meng)
- Hu Jun as Yang Cang (Guan Yu)
- Leo Wu as Yang Ping (Guan Ping)
- Guan Xiaotong as Qingping (Lady Sun)
- Wang Jingchun as Lu Yan (Lu Su)

== Production ==
Shooting began on 18 March 2017.

== Film color ==
All the costumes, props and scenes were rendered in black and white as much as possible to achieve the feeling of Chinese ink painting, but not pure black and white. Most of the actual scenes in the movie were shot on a real rainy day, directly controlling the colours physically and not using a computer to fade out the excess colours after shooting. This style of ink painting was something Zhang Yimou wanted to try years ago before Shadow.

== Home media ==
Well Go USA released the film on DVD, Blu-ray, and 4K UHD in North America on 13 August 2019, and in the United Kingdom in September 2019.

== Reception ==
Shadow was lauded by critics upon its release for its cinematography and set design. On the film review aggregator website Rotten Tomatoes, the film has an approval rating of 94% based on 103 reviews and an average rating of 7.6/10. The website's critical consensus reads, "Beautifully filmed and inventively choreographed, Shadow is a thrilling and visually sumptuous wuxia epic that finds director Zhang Yimou near peak form." On Metacritic, the film has an average score of 81 out of 100, based on 25 critics, indicating "universal acclaim".

=== Awards and nominations ===
Award	Category	Recipients	Result
55th Golden Horse Awards	Best Feature Film	Shadow	Nominated
55th Golden Horse Awards	Best Director	Zhang Yimou	Won
55th Golden Horse Awards	Best Leading Actor	Deng Chao	Nominated
55th Golden Horse Awards	Best Leading Actress	Sun Li	Nominated
55th Golden Horse Awards	Best Adapted Screenplay	Li Wei and Zhang Yimou	Nominated
55th Golden Horse Awards	Best Cinematography	Zhao Xiaoding	Nominated
55th Golden Horse Awards	Best Visual Effects	Samson Wong	Won
55th Golden Horse Awards	Best Art Direction	Ma Kwong-wing	Won
55th Golden Horse Awards	Best Makeup & Costume Design	Chen Minzheng	Won
55th Golden Horse Awards	Best Action Choreography	Dee Dee	Nominated
55th Golden Horse Awards	Best Original Film Score	Loudboy	Nominated
55th Golden Horse Awards	Best Sound Effects	Yang Jiang and Zhao Nan	Nominated
45th Saturn Awards	Best International Film		Nominated
45th Saturn Awards	Best Director	Zhang Yimou	Nominated
45th Saturn Awards	Best Production Design	Horace Ma Gwong-Wing	Nominated
45th Saturn Awards	Best Costume Design	Chen Minzheng	Nominated
32nd Golden Rooster Awards	Best Art Direction	Horace Ma	Nominated
32nd Golden Rooster Awards	Best Cinematography	Zhao Xiaoding	Nominated
39th Hong Kong Film Awards	Best Asian Chinese Language Film	Shadow	Nominated
