= Zhao Xiaoli =

Zhao Xiaoli may refer to:

- Zhao Xiaoli (canoeist)
- Zhao Xiaoli (actress)
