= Daisuke Nakagawa (actor) =

Japanese actor and model (born 1998)

- Born: January 5, 1998 (age 28); Tokyo, Japan
- Occupations: Actor; model
- Years active: 2016–present
- Agent: Ken-On
- Height: 184 cm (6 ft 0 in)

Japanese name
- Kanji: 中川 大輔
- Hiragana: なかがわ だいすけ
Transcriptions
- Romanization: Nakagawa Daisūke

Daisuke Nakagawa (中川 大輔, Nakagawa Daisūke; born January 5, 1998) is a Japanese actor and model signed under the talent agency Ken-On.

== Early life and career ==
Nakagawa was born on January 5, 1998, in Tokyo. He has one older sister. After he graduated from junior high school, his family moved to Itoman, Okinawa Prefecture. There he graduated from Konan High School.

In 2016, while Nakagawa was a freshman in university, he auditioned for the men's fashion magazine Men's Non-no and was able to win the grand prize and signed as an exclusive model for the said magazine.

On February 8, 2017, he made his acting debut as a guest appearance in the fourth episode of the NTV drama Tokyo Tarareba Girls. Two years later, on February 1, 2019, he signed with his current agency, Ken-On. In April of the same year, he made his first regular appearance in a drama in the series Where Did My Skirt Go?. In September, Nakawaga appeared in the special effects drama Kamen Rider Zero-One as Jin/Kamen Rider Jin.

In 2022, he made his first appearance in the NHK Asadora drama series, Soar High!.

== Filmography ==
=== Film ===
Year	Title	Role	Notes	Ref(s)
2019	Kamen Rider Reiwa: The First Generation	Kamen Rider Jin		
2020	Kamen Rider Zero-One the Movie: Real×Time	Kamen Rider Jin		
2022	Wedding High	Koji Matsunami		
2022	Is Miso Curry Milk Ramen Good?	Haru Chono		
2022	The Way of the Househusband: The Movie	Noburo Ida		
2025	Under the Big Onion	Kiichi		

=== Television ===
Year	Title	Role	Notes	Ref(s)
2017	Tokyo Tarareba Girls	Model (cameo)	Episode 4	
2019	Where Did My Skirt Go?	Denji Sunaga		
2019	Beshari-Gurashi	Cameo	Episode 6	
2019	Kamen Rider Zero-One	Kamen Rider Jin/ Kamen Rider Ark Zero		
2020	The Way of the Househusband	Noburo Ida		
2021	Forensic Pathologist Asagao 2	Tanaka		
2021	Date My Daughter!	Kenta		
2021	Colorful Love: My Androgynous Boyfriend	Rei Miwa		
2021	Voice: 110 Emergency Control Room	Yuto Katagiri		
2021	The Asagaya Sisters' Laid-Back Life Together	Sosuke Takahashi		
2022	Kamiya Utako Isn't Here at the Graduation Ceremony	Kensuke Kudo		
2022	Escape from the Bride	Naoki Matsushita		
2022	The Kindaichi Case Files	Kohei Ino	Episode 5	
2022	An Unexpected Ending in 5 Minutes	Shoichi Nakamure		
2022	Noisy by the time I'm 30	Yuto Mori	Web series; episode 6	
2022	More Than Words	Eiji Fukunaga	Web series	
2022–23	Soar High!	Rentaro Yagami	Asadora	
2023	Ōoku: The Inner Chambers	Akimoto		
2023	Minato Ward High School Girl	Kensuke Kudo		
2023	Rationally Impossible: The Unraveling of Detective Ryoko Kamimizu	Koji Arita		
2023	A Rough Lifestyle	Fukuike Masakudo		
2023	What a Wonderful World	Akira Hamaoka		
2023	Smoldering Woman and Stopping Woman	Hayato Honma		
2023	A House Without a Kotatsu	Yasuhiko Tokumaru		
2024	Patisserie Mon	Kohei Tsuchiya		
2024	A Bright Future for Her and Her Boyfriend	Yohei Nishino		
2024	Legendary Boss, Sho	Ryota Sakurai		
2025	Tokyo Salad Bowl	Reo Shakuno		
2025	Forest	Shuntaro Makino		
2025	Even Shrimp Want to Catch Sea Bream	Osamu Mizunuma		
2025	Love Begins in the World of If	Seiji Ogami	Lead role	
2026	Reboot	Eto Teramoto		
2026	Travel, Me, and Cats	Mamoru Nekogami	Lead role	
