= Tomomitsu Yamaguchi =

Japanese actor

- Born: March 14, 1969 (age 57); Shijōnawate, Osaka, Japan
- Occupations: Comedian, actor, voice actor, singer, presenter

Tomomitsu Yamaguchi (山口智充, Yamaguchi Tomomitsu; born March 14, 1969) is a Japanese comedian, actor, voice actor, singer and presenter from Shijōnawate, Osaka. He is a graduate of the Osaka Prefecture North Shijōnawate Senior High School. He is currently attached to the Yoshimoto Creative Agency. He is best known as the boke half of the Manzai act "DonDokoDon" alongside tsukkomi Keiji Hirahata.

== Appearances ==
=== Television ===
- Shinsengumi! (2004), Nagakura Shinpachi
- Maiagare! (2022–23), Masaru Umezu

=== Film ===
- Mind Game (2004), Ryō (voice)
- Demon Girl (2020), Daitetsu Onigawara
- A Day Begins (2024)
- Bishu: The World's Kindest Clothes (2024), Sadao Saito
- Gorilla Hall (2025)

=== Japanese dub ===
Live-action

- Johnny English, Johnny English (Rowan Atkinson)

Animation

- Cars, Mater
- Cars 2, Mater
- Cars 3, Mater
- Shark Tale, Lenny

== Impression repertoire ==
- After-hours brass band club music
- Show Aikawa
- Kiyoshi Atsumi
- Budgerigar
- Chocoball Mukai
- Cicada
- Demon Kogure
- Faraway festival
- Fireworks
- Giichi Fujimoto
- Gucchi Yūzō chorus
- Koji Higashino
- Kyosuke Himuro
- Hollywood film scenes (horror, war, crime, etc.)
- Hollywood star interviewer
- Kazuyuki Izutsu
- Jumpy Compact Disc
- Unsuku Kei
- Kōji Kikkawa
- Manfuku Kin
- Ryō Kinomoto
- Masahiro Kuwana
- Keisuke Kuwata
- Hiroki Matsukata
- Eiji Minakata
- Hibari Misora
- Yoshinori Monta
- Mr. Bean
- Tsuyoshi Nagabuchi
- Akira Nakao
- Gorō Naya (as Kōichi Zenigata)
- Nogeyama Zoo lion
- Takashi Okamura
- Kōhei Ōtomo
- Passion Yara
- Rikiya (Rikiya Yasuoka)
- Hideki Saijō
- Motoharu Sano
- Shinkansen passing by
- Showa era radio
- Table tennis
- Junpei Takiguchi
- The Terminator
- Tom and Jerry dog
- Variety show commercial cameraman
- Wideshow reporter
- Hiroyuki Yabe
- Shingo Yanagisawa
- Takajin Yashiki
- Eikichi Yazawa
- Ikuzo Yoshi
