= 13th Asia Pacific Screen Awards =

Edition of award ceremony

- Date: 21 November 2019
- Site: Brisbane Conventions and Exhibition Centre, Brisbane; Australia

Highlights
- Best Film: Parasite
- Best Actor: Manoj Bajpai
- Best Actress: Maxene Eigenmann
- Most awards: Beanpole (2)
- Most nominations: So Long, My Son (6)

The 13th Asia Pacific Screen Awards were held on 21 November 2019 in Brisbane, Australia.

== Winners and nominees ==
Complete list of winners and nominees:

Best Feature Film	Achievement in Directing
Parasite - Kwak Sin-ae and Bong Joon-ho (Korea); Balloon - Huang Xufeng, Jacky Pang Yee Wah (China); Beanpole - Alexander Rodnyansky, Sergey Melkumov (Russia); The Gold-Laden Sheep and The Sacred Mountain - Akshay Singh, Ridham Janve (India); So Long, My Son - Xuan Liu (China)	Adilkhan Yerzhanov - A Dark, Dark Man (Kazakhstan) (France); Lav Diaz - The Halt (Philippines); Elia Suleiman - It Must Be Heaven (Palestine) (Qatar) (Turkey) (Canada) (France) (Germany); Anocha Suwichakornpong, Ben Rivers - Krabi, 2562 (Thailand) (United Kingdom); Wang Xiaoshuai - So Long, My Son (China)
Best Performance by an Actor	Best Performance by an Actress
Manoj Bajpai – Bhonsle as Ganpath Bhonsle (India); Eran Naim – Love Trilogy: Chained as Rashi (Israel) (Germany); Navid Mohammadzadeh – Just 6.5 as Naser (Iran); Mohsen Tanabandeh – Rona, Azim's Mother as Azim (Iran) (Afghanistan); Wang Jingchun – So Long, My Son as Liu Yaojun (China)	Maxene Eigenmann – Verdict as Joy Santos (Philippines) (France); Viktoria Miroshnichenko – Beanpole as Iya Sergueeva (Russia); Samal Yeslyamova – The Horse Thieves. Roads of Time as Aigal (Kazakhstan) (Japan); Park Ji-hu – House of Hummingbird as Eun-hee (Korea); Yong Mei – So Long, My Son as Wang Liyun (China)
Best Screenplay	Best Youth Feature Film
Kantemir Balagov, Aleksandr Terekhov – Beanpole (Russia); Pema Tseden – Balloon (China); Mohsen Gharaie, Mohammad Davoudi – Castle of Dreams (Iran); Tamar Shavgulidze – Comets (Georgia (country)); A Mei, Wang Xiaoshuai – So Long, My Son (China)	Buoyancy (Australia); The Crossing (China); A First Farewell (China); The Orphanage (Afghanistan) (Denmark) (Germany) (France) (Luxembourg) (Qatar); The Red Phallus (Bhutan) (Nepal) (Germany)
Best Documentary Feature Film	Best Animated Feature Film
Advocate (Israel) (Canada) (Switzerland); Aquarela (United Kingdom) (Germany) (Denmark); The Australian Dream (Australia) (United Kingdom); Narrow Red Line (Iran); One Child Nation (China) (United States)	Weathering with You (Japan); Mosley (New Zealand) (China); Penguin Highway (Japan); Underdog (Korea); The Unseen (Iran)
Achievement in Cinematography	UNESCO Award
Ksenia Sereda - Beanpole (Russia); Yu Ninghui, Xu Deng - Dwelling in the Fuchun Mountains (China); Saurabh Monga - The Gold-Laden Sheep & the Sacred Mountain (India); Teoh Gay Hian - The Science of Fictions (Indonesia) (Malaysia) (France); Kim Hyunseok - So Long, My Son (China)	Rona, Azim's Mother (Iran) (Afghanistan); Bhonsle (India); It Must Be Heaven (Palestine) (Qatar) (Turkey) (Canada) (France) (Germany); Made in Bangladesh (France) (Denmark) (Portugal); The Sun Above Me Never Sets (Russia)
