= Weathering with You =

2019 Japanese film by Makoto Shinkai

- Theatrical release poster

Japanese name
- Kanji: 天気の子
- Literal meaning: Child of Weather
Transcriptions
- Revised Hepburn: Tenki no Ko
- Directed by: Makoto Shinkai
- Written by: Makoto Shinkai
- Produced by: Wakana Okamura; Kinue Itō
- Starring: Kotaro Daigo; Nana Mori; Tsubasa Honda; Sakura Kiryu; Sei Hiraizumi; Yuki Kaji; Chieko Baisho; Shun Oguri
- Cinematography: Ryōsuke Tsuda
- Edited by: Makoto Shinkai
- Music by: Radwimps
- Production companies: CoMix Wave Films; Story Inc.
- Distributed by: Toho
- Release date: July 19, 2019 (Japan)
- Running time: 112 minutes
- Country: Japan
- Language: Japanese
- Box office: US$193.8 million

Weathering with You (Japanese: 天気の子, Hepburn: Tenki no Ko; lit. 'Child of Weather') is a 2019 Japanese animated romantic fantasy film written and directed by Makoto Shinkai, produced by CoMix Wave Films and distributed by Toho. A second installment of Shinkai's Disaster trilogy, following Your Name (2016) and followed by Suzume (2022), the film follows a 16-year-old high school boy, Hodaka Morishima, who runs away from his troubled rural home to Tokyo, and later befriends Hina Amano, an orphaned girl who has the ability to control the weather.

It features the voices of Kotaro Daigo and Nana Mori, with animation direction by Atsushi Tamura, character design by Masayoshi Tanaka, and its orchestral score and soundtrack composed by Radwimps; the latter two previously collaborated with Shinkai on Your Name (2016). A light novel of the same name, also written by Shinkai, was published a day prior to the film's premiere, while a manga adaptation was serialized in Monthly Afternoon on July 25, 2019.

Weathering with You was theatrically released in conventional, IMAX, and 4DX theaters in Japan on July 19, 2019, and was released in the United States on January 17, 2020. It received positive reviews from critics, with praise for the animation, screenplay, music, visuals, and emotional weight. The film grossed US$193.8 million worldwide, becoming the highest grossing Japanese film of 2019 and the eleventh highest-grossing Japanese film of all time, unadjusted for inflation.

The film won a number of awards, including being selected as the Japanese entry for Best International Feature Film at the 92nd Academy Awards, but was not nominated. It received four Annie Award nominations, including for Best Independent Animated Feature, tying Spirited Away, Millennium Actress, (both 2001) and Ghost in the Shell 2: Innocence (2005) for the second-joint most nominations for an anime film at the Annies, behind Ghost in the Shell (1995) and then Belle (2021) with five.

== Plot ==
In June 2021, high schooler Hodaka Morishima runs away from home. When his ferry to Tokyo is hit by a torrential rainstorm, he is almost washed away, but is saved by Keisuke Suga. Suga gives the boy his business card and tells him to call if he needs a job. Hodaka struggles to find work in the city. He finds an abandoned Makarov PM handgun and keeps it even though guns are illegal. (Note: Under the Firearm and Sword Possession Control Law) He meets Hina Amano, a McDonald's employee, who pities him and gives him free food. Suga hires him as his assistant; he and his niece Natsumi publish a small occult magazine investigating strange phenomena, including the unusually rainy weather. They hear the legend of "Sunshine Girls" who can stop rain, and bring sunshine.

Hodaka sees Hina being intimidated into working at a club and in panic, fires his gun at the club owner, barely missing him. Hina takes him to Yoyogi Kaikan, an abandoned building with a shrine on the roof, where he also throws the gun away, and amazes him by demonstrating her ability to clear the sky by praying. Hodaka learns that Hina is an orphan living alone with her younger brother Nagi. Seeing that they are also in financial trouble, Hodaka proposes they start a business having Hina clear the weather for social gatherings. Their business becomes a success, but Hina is filmed and shown on television, leading to their site getting flooded with requests. They decide to temporarily suspend business to let Hina rest. Meanwhile, Suga and Natsumi interview the old priest of a shrine who tells them the legend of "Weather Maidens" (天気の乙女, Tenki no Otome) who can control the rain, adding that they pay a heavy price for their powers.

Police are searching for Hodaka, whose family has reported him missing. They trace him using security footage of him using the gun. Officers arrive at Hina's apartment and interrogate her; Hina realizes that because they have no legal guardian, social services will separate her and Nagi. Suga, also visited by the police, fires Hodaka, explaining that police suspect him of kidnapping, and gives him severance pay in cash. Hodaka, Hina, and Nagi decide to run away together. As torrential rain, unnatural cold, and even snow continue to descend on Tokyo, a state of emergency is declared in response to the severe and abnormal weather.

Police spot Hodaka as a fugitive and restrain him, but he is saved by Hina, who unintentionally uses her powers to destroy a small box truck with lightning. They take shelter in a hotel using the cash Hodaka received from Suga. Hina reveals that her body is slowly turning transparent the more she uses her power, and says her sacrifice will allow the weather to return to normal. The next day, Hina has vanished and the rain has stopped. The police track Hodaka to the hotel and take him into custody. Nagi is sent to the children's counseling center.

Hodaka, realizing that he has fallen in love with Hina, escapes from custody with the help of Natsumi. The police surround Hodaka in the abandoned building, but Suga, inspired by Hodaka's desperation to find Hina, helps him escape. At the rooftop shrine, Hodaka jumps through the torii gate and is transported into the sky, where he finds Hina and asks her to return with him, insisting that she let go of her worries about the weather and start living for herself. As soon as they return to the rooftop shrine, Hina, Hodaka, Natsumi, Nagi, and Suga are all arrested, and the heavy rains resume. Hodaka is sentenced to three years of probation and sent back to his home in Kōzu-shima.

Three years later, the rain has been falling incessantly in Tokyo, submerging much of the city. In spring 2024, having finished his probation, Hodaka graduates from high school and returns to Tokyo to start college. He meets with Suga, who has expanded his business. After Suga encourages him to find Hina, Hodaka finds her praying on a street overlooking the drowned city. They reunite, with Hodaka promising her that they will be all right.

== Voice cast ==
Character	Japanese	English
Hodaka Morishima (森嶋 帆高, Morishima Hodaka)	Kotaro Daigo	Brandon Engman
A sixteen-year-old boy who ran away from home and moved to Tokyo.
Hina Amano (天野 陽菜, Amano Hina)	Nana Mori	Ashley Boettcher
A fourteen-year-old girl who is taking various part-time jobs to support her family after her mother's death. She has a unique ability to control the weather in various forms such as rain and lightning with her emotions while bringing sunlight by praying.
Keisuke Suga (須賀 圭介, Suga Keisuke)	Shun Oguri	Lee Pace
A middle-aged man who runs a small publishing company where Hodaka ends up working part-time.
Natsumi Suga (須賀 夏美, Suga Natsumi)	Tsubasa Honda	Alison Brie
Keisuke's niece and a college student who works part-time at his office.
Nagi Amano (天野 凪, Amano Nagi)	Sakura Kiryu	Emeka Guindo
Hina's younger ten-year-old brother that lives with her.
Yasui (安井, Yasui)	Sei Hiraizumi	Mike Pollock
A police officer and Takai's partner, who is working on Hodaka's case.
Takai (高井, Takai)	Yuki Kaji	Riz Ahmed
A police officer and Yasui's partner, who is working on Hodaka's case.
Kana (カナ, Kana)	Kana Hanazawa	Echo Picone
A fourth grader with long hair who is Nagi's girlfriend.
Ayane (アヤネ, Ayane)	Ayane Sakura	Emma de Paauw
A fifth grader with short hair who is Nagi's ex-girlfriend.
Fumi Tachibana (立花 冨美, Tachibana Fumi)	Chieko Baisho	Barbara Goodson
An old widow who asks Hina to bring sunshine on the anniversary of her husband's death.
Taki Tachibana (立花 瀧, Tachibana Taki)	Ryunosuke Kamiki	Michael Sinterniklaas
An architecture student and sketch-artist; he is Fumi's grandson. By the epilogue, he is Mitsuha's husband. He originally appeared in Your Name, Shinkai's preceding film.
Mitsuha Miyamizu (宮水 三葉, Miyamizu Mitsuha)	Mone Kamishiraishi	Stephanie Sheh
A jewelry saleswoman at the LUMINE mall in Shinjuku; she moved to Tokyo eight years before the events of the film following a comet striking her birthplace. By the epilogue, she is Taki's wife and Fumi's granddaughter-in-law. Like her husband, she originally appeared in Your Name.

== Production ==
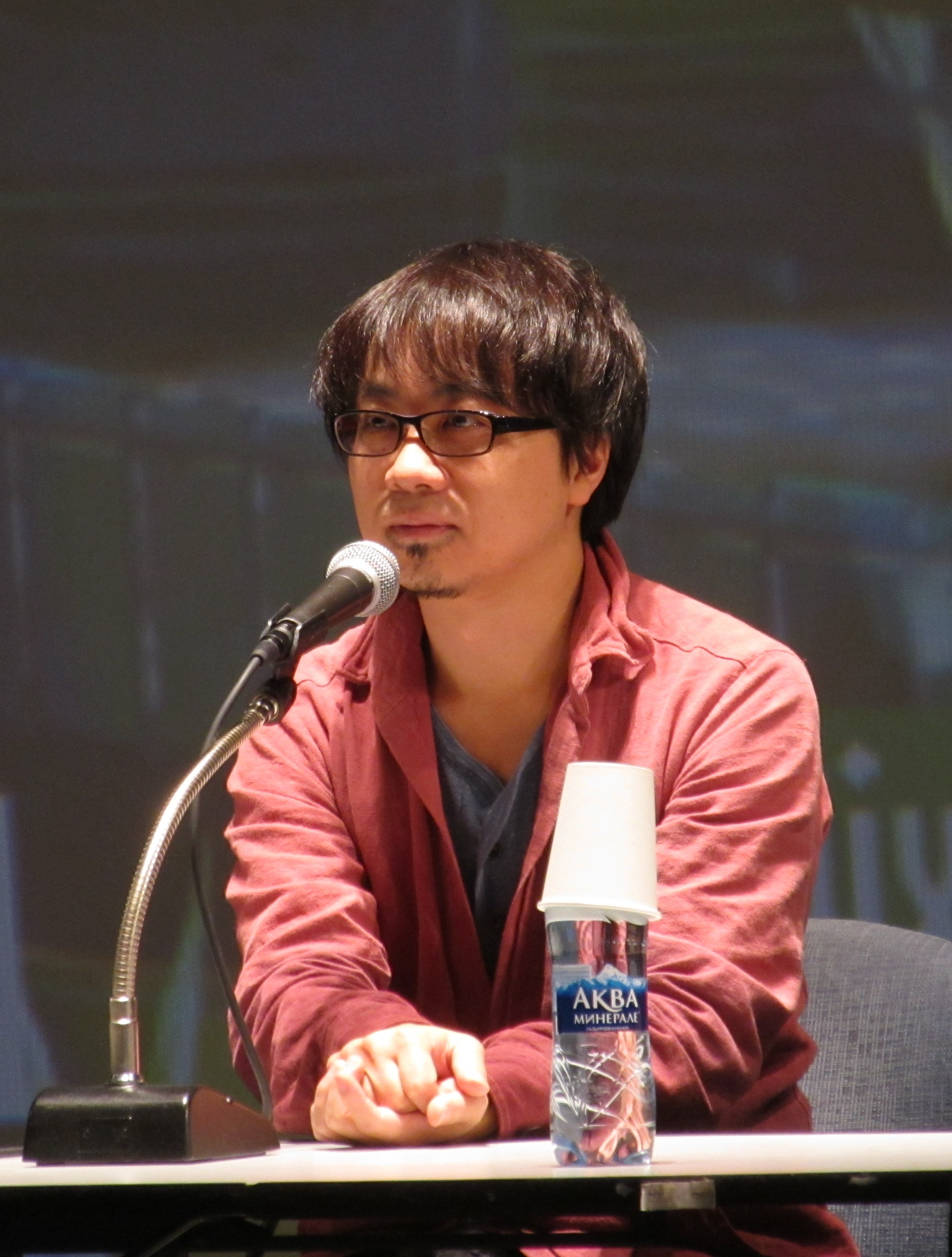
Makoto Shinkai, the film's director, in Moscow (2013)

On August 2, 2018, Makoto Shinkai announced that he was making a new feature film that would be released the following year. The film staff included Masayoshi Tanaka as the character designer, Atsushi Tamura as the animation director and Hiroshi Takiguchi as the art director. Shinkai tweeted about his admiration for Shikao Suga, and that he "borrowed" the last name for the character Keisuke Suga.

In February 2017, plot development of Weathering with You began, and in April, character design and development started. In July, Shinkai began writing the script of the film. In August, development setting, location scouting and information collecting started. Storyboarding began two months later in October. In May 2018, animation work commenced, while the development of the rain material in the film started in July. In August, the cast audition was held, and art background work started in September. In October, the cast of Hina and Hodaka had been chosen. On December 13, 2018, a press conference was held to reveal the film's first key visual and it was announced that it would be released on July 19, 2019. Photo shooting for the film started in January 2019. The first trailer debuted on April 10, exactly 100 days before the premiere. Additional posters of the film and the second trailer was released on May 28. All work was completed by July 7, and the film was ready to be released.

In an interview, Shinkai said, "I thought, 'Should I make my next film so that I don't anger more people, or should I make a movie that angers them further?' And I chose the latter." He also added that he was influenced by the impact of climate change on Japan, particularly the increase in rainfall during the summer months. He revealed that he used both CG and traditional hand drawn animation to depict the rain in the film. The writing process of the story includes getting feedback from the production team, he revealed that he took around six months to write his previous film, Your Name, and another six months for Weathering With You. Shinkai chose a more "supernatural" approach on this film, as opposed to the science-fiction angle he used for Your Name. When asked for the reason of including the characters from Your Name, Shinkai said, "Personally, I wanted to see Taki and Mitsuha again before they met."

=== Casting ===
Around 2,000 people auditioned for the roles of the film's two protagonists with Kotaro Daigo and Nana Mori being chosen. Other key roles were filled with returning crew members of Your Name. Daigo and Mori began recording their parts on April 27, 2019. On May 29, 2019, additional cast was announced: Shun Oguri (Keisuke Suga), Tsubasa Honda (Natsumi), Chieko Baisho (Tomi), Sakura Kiryuu (Nagi Amano), Sei Hiraizumi (Yasui), and Yuki Kaji (Takai).

== Music ==
Like Shinkai's Your Name, Japanese rock band Radwimps wrote and composed the soundtrack and score for the film. It was released worldwide on July 19, 2019, the day of the film's release. "Is There Still Anything That Love Can Do?" (愛にできることはまだあるかい, "Ai ni Dekiru Koto wa Mada Aru Kai") is the film's theme song. It become the top-selling song in the weekly digital single chart of July 15–21. Another song, "Grand Escape (Movie Edit) feat. Tōko Miura" from the film ranked second with over 41,000 downloads. The film's soundtrack album won multiple awards, including the Japan Gold Disc Award and the 43rd Japan Academy Film Prize.

== Marketing ==
Logo of Weathering with You

Producer Genki Kawamura presented a work in process screening on June 14, 2019, at the Annecy International Animation Film Festival in France that was open to industry professionals and students but not the general public. TV Asahi aired footage from the film's opening scene during a reshowing of Shinkai's previous film Your Name on June 30. Before its screening in Japan, Uniqlo launched special t-shirts with designs inspired by Weathering with You and Shinkai's previous anime films. Weathering With You reportedly promoted multiple products and companies including SoftBank Group, Suntory and Baitoru, in television advertisements. During its screening in Japan, many convenience stores such as Lawson, launched food products inspired by the film. Lawson also created a new beverage called Ameiro Jelly Tea, a herbal tea infused with blue flower petals.

== Release ==
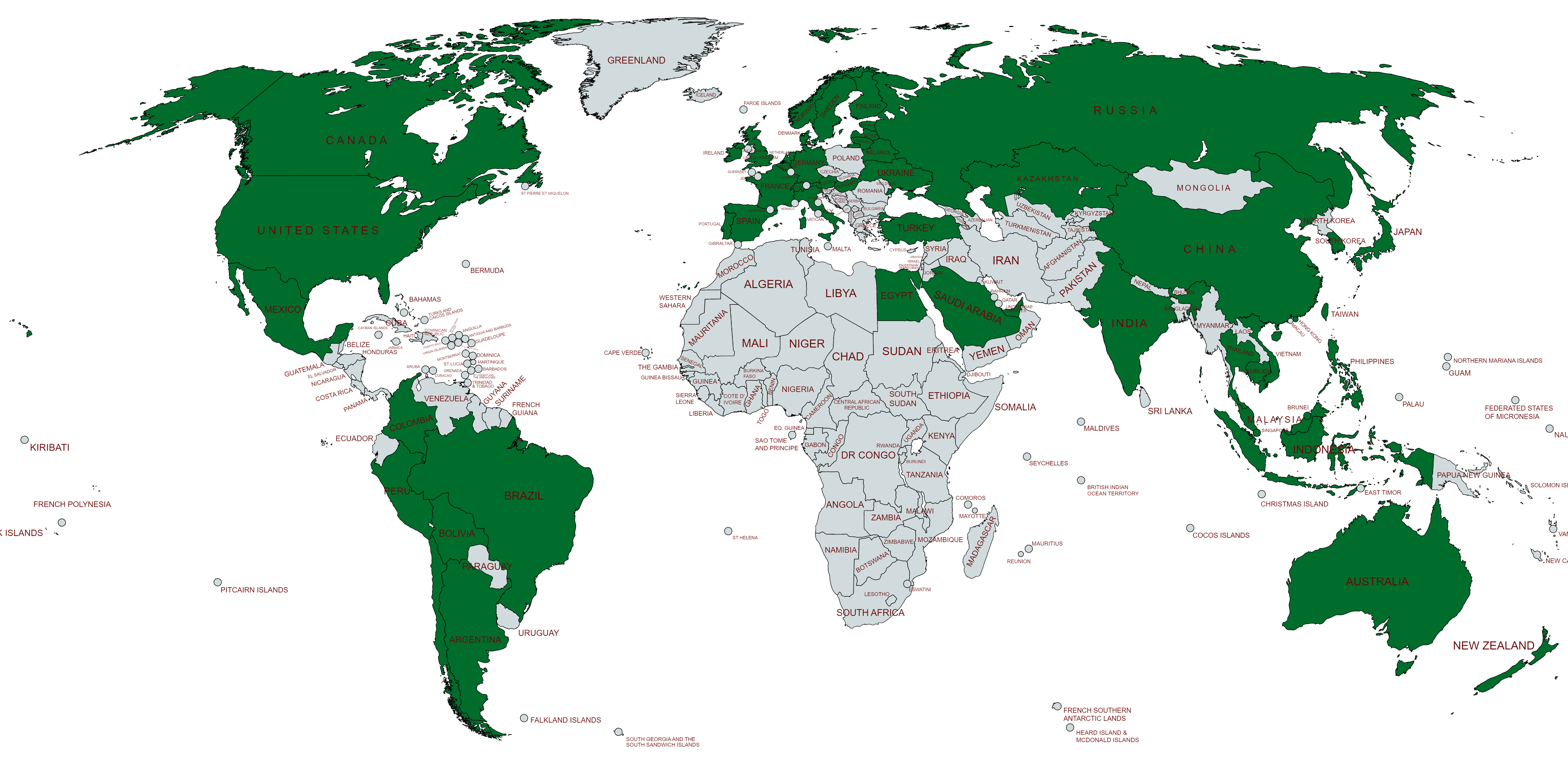
World map showing countries and regions where the film was released theatrically (green)

Weathering with You was released in Japan on July 19, 2019, at 9 a.m. (JST) by its distributor Toho on 448 screens in 359 theaters across the country. Theaters in Tokyo's Shinjuku and Osaka's Umeda districts, however, premiered the film at midnight on July 18. The official Weathering with You announced on September 20 that the film would be shown in the popular 4DX and MX4D formats throughout Japan from September 27. The film was produced by Genki Kawamura with CoMix Wave Films and Story Inc. revealed as the film's producers. On July 16, it was announced that the film would be released worldwide; releases had already been decided for 140 countries in North America, Europe, Asia, and South America, exceeding the 135 for Your Name.

In Asia, EDKO Films released the film in Hong Kong on August 8, Encore Films streamed a Malay, Chinese, and English-subtitled trailer and announced and released the film in few Southeast Asia countries including; Indonesia on August 21, Vietnam on August 30, Malaysia & Brunei on September 5 and Singapore on September 12. Pioneer Films announced and released the movie in the Philippines on August 17 for an advanced screening in SM Megamall and August 28 for general release. Producer Genki Kawamura said they want to release it in India because 53,000 people signed a petition requesting its release there. On August 10, director Makoto Shinkai and the official page of Weathering with You announced through Twitter the film would be screened in 20 Indian cities including Mumbai and Delhi from October 11, 2019. PVR Pictures and Bookmyshow-backed theater-on-demand platform Vkaao distributed the film. It was the first mature Japanese animated film to be screened theatrically in India. CJ CGV premiered in South Korea on October 30. Volga Film Company has confirmed it would release the film in Russia on October 31. Thai film distributor Major Group announced the film would open in Thailand on November 7, 2019, but was changed to September 5, 2019. The film has been approved by Beijing's censors and hit Chinese theaters on November 1.

In North America, GKIDS announced that it had acquired the rights of the film and screened an awards-qualifying run in 2019, followed by a theatrical release with Japanese and English-language options on January 17, 2020. The 44th Toronto International Film Festival, which was held from September 5 to 15 in 2019, hosted the North American premiere of the film. As part of the "Special Presentation" category, it is eligible to compete for the People's Choice award. Reportedly Fathom Events released the film in theaters in the United States on January 15 and 16 as a "Special Fan Preview" with special bonus content. GKIDS screened the film in the US at Animation Is Film Festival on October 18, 2019, with Makoto Shinkai in attendance. GKIDS also screened it at Anime NYC 2019 on November 17, 2019, as the east coast premiere. It additionally received a one-week IMAX and 4DX showing.

In Europe, the 67th San Sebastián International Film Festival in Spain hosted the European premiere of the film from September 20 to 28, 2019. Anime Limited acquired the UK and Ireland rights of the film, premiering the film at Scotland Loves Anime on October 12, 2019, with a theatrical run in Japanese and English-language options from January 17, 2020. In Italy, Dynit and Nexo Digital released the film theatrically on October 14, 2019. Selecta Visión has licensed it in Spain and screened the film on November 29, 2019. In France, the film was released on January 8, 2020, by Anime Limited and BAC Films. In Germany, the film was released on January 16, 2020, by Universum Film. In Portugal, the film was released on February 20, 2020, by Big Picture Films.

In Australia and New Zealand, Madman Entertainment acquired the rights of the film and began screening it theatrically from August 22, 2019, with encore screenings of the English dub from February 13, 2020.

In the Middle East, Front Row Filmed Entertainment released the film on September 10, 2020.

=== Home media ===
The film was released on Blu-ray in Japan on May 27, 2020. A collectors edition included a 4K UHD Disc with English and Chinese subtitles. The film was released digitally in North America on August 4, 2020, with a subsequent release on Blu-ray and DVD on September 15, 2020, and a limited edition 4K UHD following on November 17, 2020.

In Japan, the film sold 157,750 physical home video units in twelve days by June 7, 2020, including 111,403 Blu-ray units and 46,347 DVD units. In the United States, the film grossed $4.6 million from Blu-ray and DVD sales, as of April 2022. In the United Kingdom, where it was the first anime to receive a 4K home video release, it was 2020's second best-selling foreign-language film on physical home video formats (just below Parasite).

== Reception ==
=== Box office ===
During its initial screening in 359 theaters and 448 screens in Japan, Weathering with You sold 1,159,020 tickets to earn ¥1,643,809,400 (approx $15.22 million) in its first three days. It was reported that Weathering with You surpassed Shinkai's previous film, Your Name, which earned ¥1,277,960,000 (about $12.51 million at the time) in its first three days of screening, earning 28.6% more. By August 25, 2019, it had sold eight million tickets and earned ¥10.73 billion (about $101 million). By September 9, 2019, it had earned ¥12 billion and became the highest-grossing film of 2019 in Japan. By October 2, 2019, the film had sold over 10 million tickets in Japan, after 75 days on the market. By October 20, 2019, it had sold 10.27 million tickets and grossed ¥13.7 billion in Japan. As of April 12, 2020, the film has grossed ¥14.06 billion ($89 million) in Japan, and became the thirteenth highest-grossing film of all time in Japan.

In China, the film had sold 8,985,208 tickets and grossed $42.4 million in its first 17 days on the market, by November 19, 2019. By the end of November 2019, the film had grossed CN¥288.65 million ($44.75 million) in China. In Singapore, it grossed S$1.04 million (US$747,158.67) and became the highest-grossing anime film in Singapore. In the United States and Canada, the film has grossed $7,798,743, as of March 15, 2020. As of July 2021, the film grossed over $193.4 million worldwide.

=== Critical response ===
On Rotten Tomatoes the film has an approval rating of 93% based on reviews from 95 critics, with an average rating of 7.4/10. The site's critics consensus reads, "Beautifully animated and narratively engaging, Weathering with You further establishes writer-director Makoto Shinkai as a singularly talented filmmaker." On Metacritic, the film has a weighted average score of 72 out of 100 based on reviews from 30 critic reviews, indicating "generally favorable reviews".

Brian Ashcraft of Kotaku praised the film, writing that "Shinkai's ability to contrast traditional Japanese religion and beliefs with modern society continues to be interesting," but criticized its muted connection to the dangers of real-world weather, inorganic supernatural elements, and selfish character decisions that lacked meaningful reflection, ultimately calling it "a good, but flawed follow up to Your Name." Daryl Harding, writing for Crunchyroll News, praised the world-building aspect of the film, stating that Shinkai has his finger on the pulse of modern Tokyo's atmosphere, but criticized the similarity between Weathering with You and Your Name. Kim Morrissy of Anime News Network also gave the film a generally positive review, praising its visuals and use of weather to convey the story's metaphor, but criticizing the execution in the second half of the film; she wrote that "Shinkai was evidently constrained by the need to fit his story into a particular template, one that didn't seem to fit the plot this time around". Twwk, reviewing the film for Beneath the Tangles, was mostly positive as well, writing; "The movie isn't as emotionally powerful as Your Name due to a screenplay that plays too loose (and lazy) to earn its huge moments, but it's still heartfelt."

James Marsh from South China Morning Post praised the film for its animation, but criticized it for its lack of "clarity of vision seen in Your Name". He described the plot as more straightforward than that of Your Name, but said it has some unanswered and "dangling" plot threads. A review by Alicia Haddick for Otaquest praised the film's attempts to differentiate itself from Makoto Shinkai's past work and praised its animation, story and music, but said that its reliance on the structure of his last film hurt the movie overall, stating that "it's impossible to discuss this film without the specter of Your Name hanging over your shoulder". Andrew Paredes, writing for ABS-CBN News, praised the film's characters, story, themes, and Makoto Shinkai's directing, saying; "The effusive emotion and Shinto mysticism rubbing up nicely against real-world concerns. And then there's the animation: Shinkai has outdone himself with this follow-up, presenting Tokyo not just with detailed fidelity, but also with a glow that suggests a lush, lambert [sic] inner life." Terence Toh, writing for The Star, praised the film's characters and story, saying; "Weathering With You boasts of wonderful visual and likeable characters. The story is also right as rain."

=== Accolades ===
The film was selected Japan's entry for Best International Feature Film at the 92nd Academy Awards, but it failed to make the shortlist. It also received four Annie Award nominations including Best Independent Animated Feature, which makes it the fourth anime film tying with Spirited Away, Millennium Actress, and Ghost in the Shell 2: Innocence to have four nominations; the second-joint highest for an anime film at the Annies, behind Ghost in the Shell (1995) and then Belle (2021) with five. The film won the Best Animated Feature Film award at the 13th Asia Pacific Screen Awards (ASPA) in Brisbane, Australia. It received the Audience Award along with Zabou Breitman and Elea Gobbe-Mevellec's The Swallows of Kabul film at the Animation Is Film Festival in Los Angeles. It was screened at the 2022 Japanese Film Festival (JFF) hosted by the Japan Foundation in India to promote cultural exchange.

List of awards and nominations
Year	Award	Category	Recipient(s)	Result	Ref.
2019	13th Asia Pacific Screen Awards	Best Animated Feature Film	Weathering with You	Won	
2019	Animation is Film Festival 2019	Audience Award	Weathering with You	Won	
2019	Scotland Loves Anime 2019	Audience Award	Weathering with You	Won	
2019	Utopiales 2019	Audience Award	Weathering with You	Won	
2019	44th Hochi Film Award	Best Animated Picture	Weathering with You	Won	
2019	44th Hochi Film Award	Best Director	Makoto Shinkai	Nominated	
2019	74th Mainichi Film Awards	Best Animation Film	Weathering with You	Nominated	
2019	74th Mainichi Film Awards	Best Music	Radwimps	Won	
2019	Florida Film Critics Awards	Best Animated Film	Weathering with You	Nominated	
2019	24th Satellite Awards	Best Animated or Mixed Media Feature	Weathering with You	Nominated	
2020	47th Annie Awards	Best Animated Feature — Independent	Weathering with You	Nominated	
2020	47th Annie Awards	Outstanding Achievement for Animated Effects in an Animated Production	Hidetsugu Ito, Yuko Nakajima, Jumi Lee, Ryosuke Tsuda	Nominated	
2020	47th Annie Awards	Outstanding Achievement for Directing in an Animated Feature Production	Makoto Shinkai	Nominated	
2020	47th Annie Awards	Outstanding Achievement for Writing in an Animated Feature Production	Makoto Shinkai	Nominated	
2020	62nd Blue Ribbon Awards	Best Film	Weathering with You	Nominated	
2020	62nd Blue Ribbon Awards	Best Director	Makoto Shinkai	Nominated	
2020	6th Anime Trending Awards	Anime Movie of the Year	Weathering with You	Won	
2020	Tokyo Anime Award Festival 2020	Anime of the Year Grand Prize (Film)	Weathering with You	Won	
2020	Tokyo Anime Award Festival 2020	Best Director	Makoto Shinkai	Won	
2020	23rd Japan Media Arts Festival Awards	Social Impact Award	Weathering with You	Won	
2020	43rd Japan Academy Film Prize	Animation of the Year	Weathering with You	Won	
2020	43rd Japan Academy Film Prize	Outstanding Achievement in Music	Radwimps	Won	
2021	38th Robert Awards	Best Non-English-language Feature	Weathering with You	Nominated	

== Adaptations ==
=== Novel ===
A novel adaptation, with the same name, was written concurrently with production of the film by the director, Makoto Shinkai. On April 30, 2019, he announced through Twitter that he had finished writing it. It was released in print and in digital format by Kadokawa Sneaker Bunko on July 18, 2019. More than 99,000 copies were sold in the first week and it took first place in the Oricon weekly library ranking on July 29. By August 16, 318,000 copies were sold, making it the first novel in the library this year to exceed 300,000 sales. By September 10, it sold over 650,000 copies in successive editions. On October 24, 2019, Yen Press announced that they had licensed the novel for North American release, in print and in digital format, on December 17.

No.	Title	Original release date	English release date
	Weathering With You	July 18, 2019; 978-4-0410-2640-3	December 17, 2019; 978-1-9753-9936-8

In addition, a children's book adaptation for children, elementary school and junior high school students, was released on August 9, 2019. It sold 13,000 copies in the first week and took first place in the "Children's Books" genre in Oricon weekly library ranking.

=== Manga ===
A manga adaptation drawn by Watari Kubota was serialized in Kodansha's seinen manga magazine Monthly Afternoon from July 25, 2019, to August 25, 2020. Its chapters were compiled in three tankobon volumes, released from November 22, 2019, to October 23, 2020.

The manga was licensed for English release in North America by Vertical in November 2019. The license expired in October 2023; the manga was added to Kodansha's K Manga digital app that November.

==== Volumes ====
No.	Original release date	Original ISBN	English release date	English ISBN
1	November 22, 2019	978-4-06-517514-9	June 16, 2020 (digital); September 1, 2020 (print)	978-1-64659-709-3 (digital); 978-1-94998-083-7 (print)
1. "Waiting for the Sun" (外持ち晴れ, Homachi Bare); 2. "The Wind" (風, Kaze); 3. "Rainclouds" (雨催い, Amamoyoi)
2	June 23, 2020	978-4-06-519396-9	January 19, 2021	978-1-63699-034-7 (digital); 978-1-94998-084-4 (print)
4. "Rain Rising" (雨翔, Ushō); 5. "To My Mother"; 6. "The Bottom of the Rain" (雨の底, Ame no Soko); 7. "Snow" (雪, Yuki); 8. "The Last Night" (最後の夜, Saigo no Yoru)
3	October 23, 2020	978-4-06-520968-4	June 15, 2021 (digital); June 1, 2021 (print)	978-1-63699-128-3 (digital); 978-1-64-729009-2 (print)
9. "Clear Skies" (快晴, Kaisei); 10. "Juvenile" (ジュブナイル, Jubunairu); 11. "Flickers of the O-Bon Flame" (迎え火のほさき, Mukaebi no Hosaki); 12. "On the Other Side" (彼岸にて, Higan nite); 13. "Weathering With You" (天気の子, Tenki no Ko)

== Gallery ==
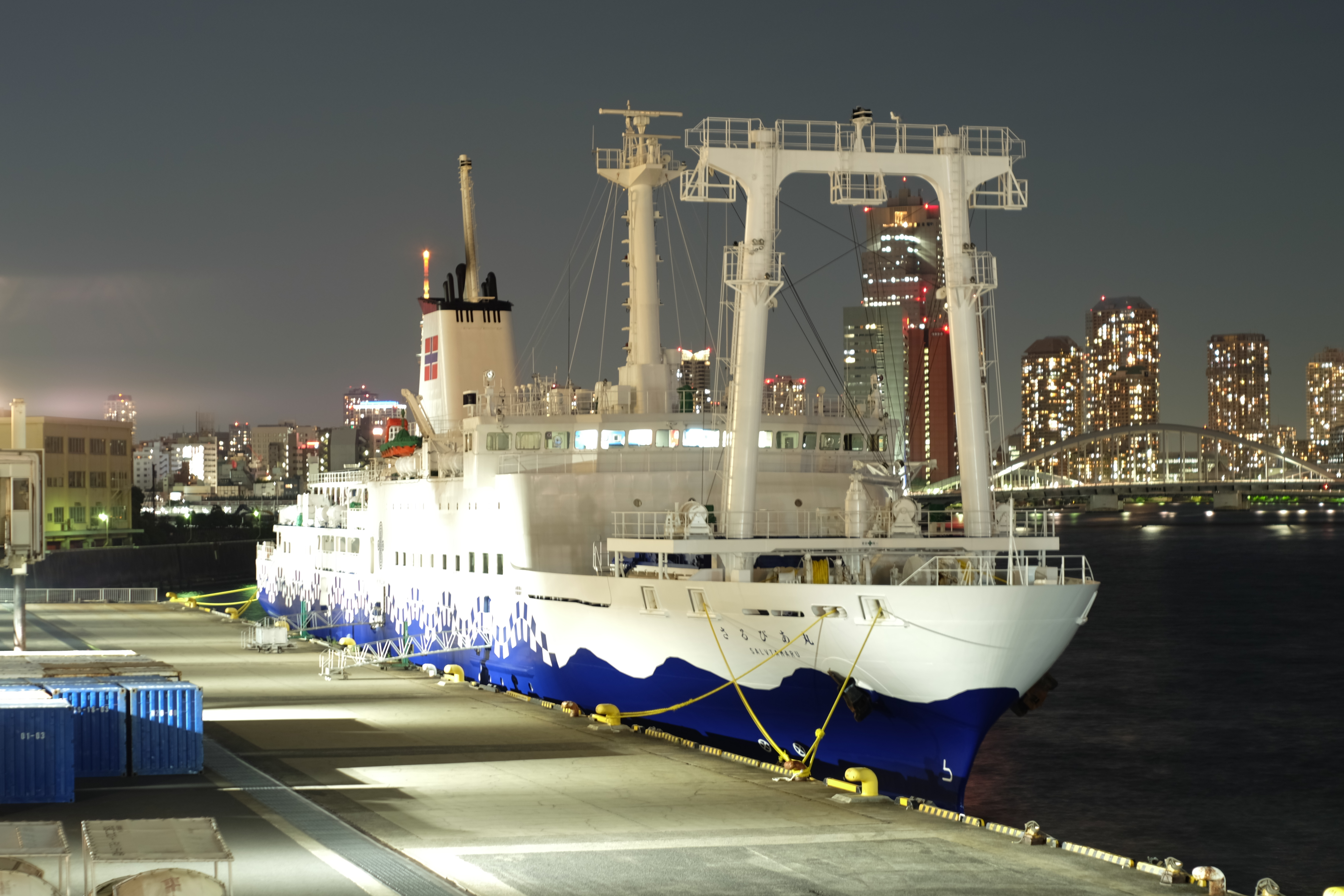
The second-generation Sarubia Maru on the Tokyo—Kōzu-shima route that Hodaka took on his way to Tokyo

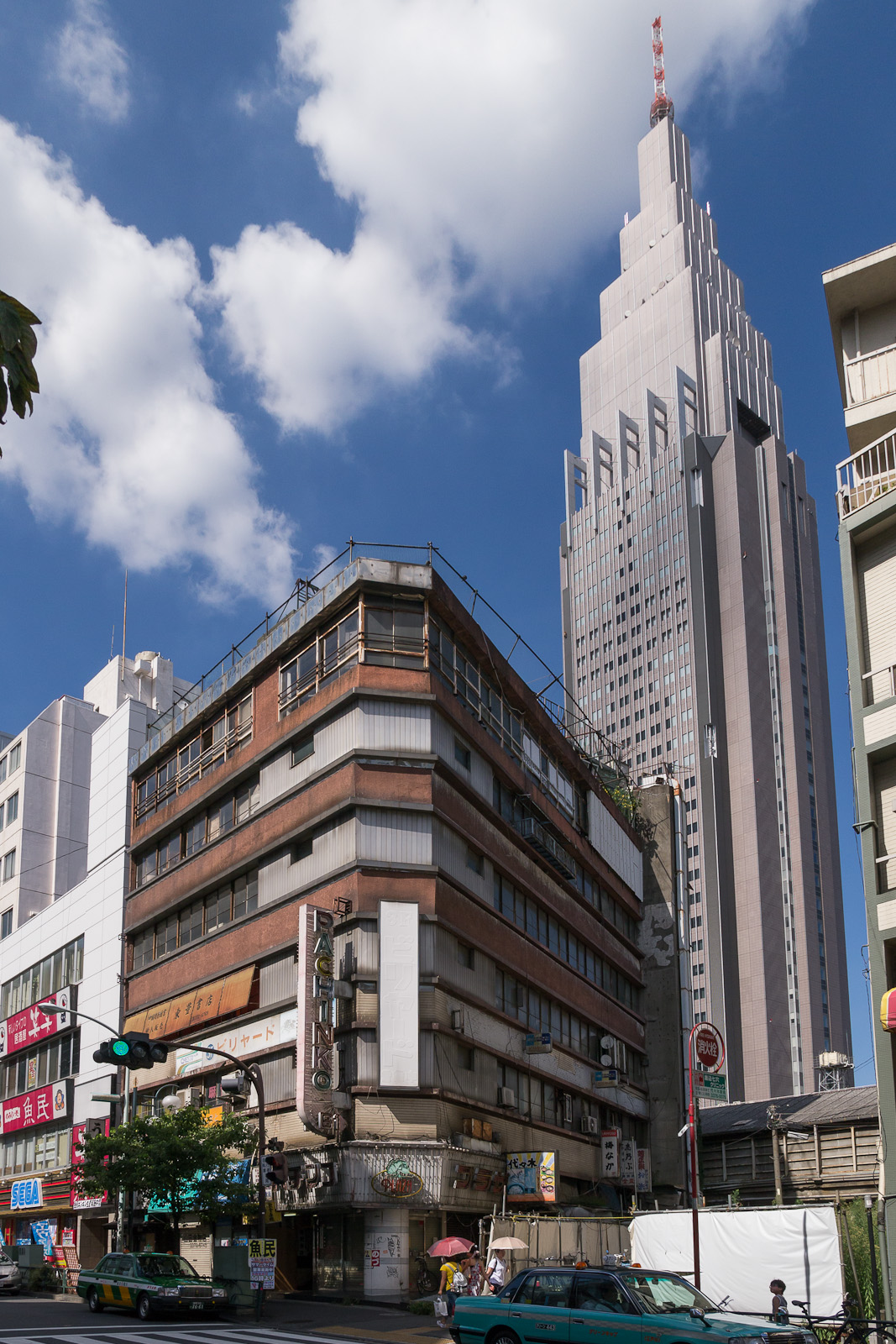
In the foreground: the abandoned Yoyogi Kaikan building that appears in the film. The demolition of the building was completed in January 2020 and it no longer exists. Note that the rooftop shrine in this film is fictional. Back: the NTT DoCoMo Yoyogi Building (Docomo Tower), which frequently appears in Shinkai's films.

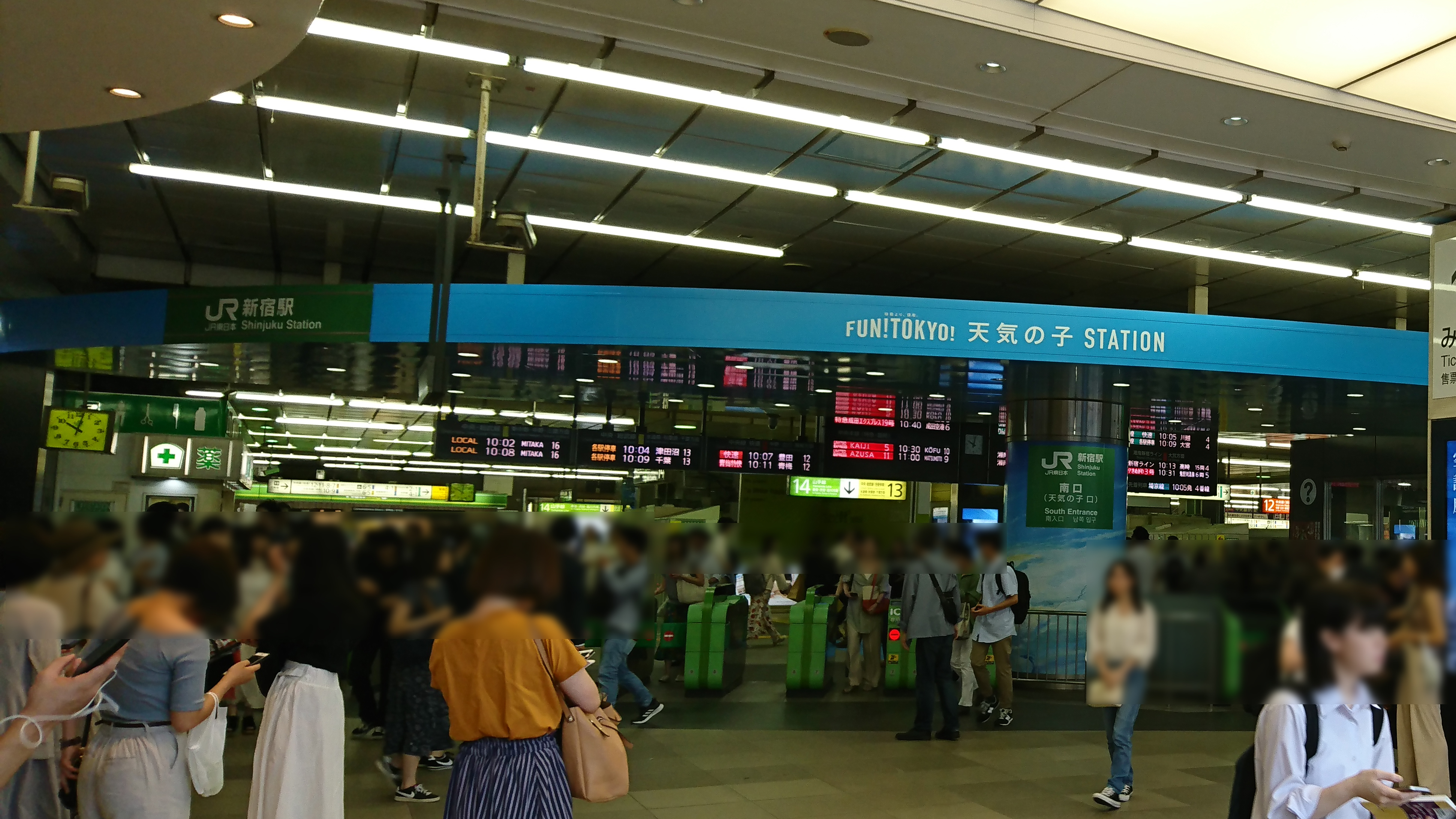
'FUN! TOKYO! Tenki no Ko STATION', a tie-up project with JR Shinjuku station, which ran for a limited time from July 19 to September 1, 2019

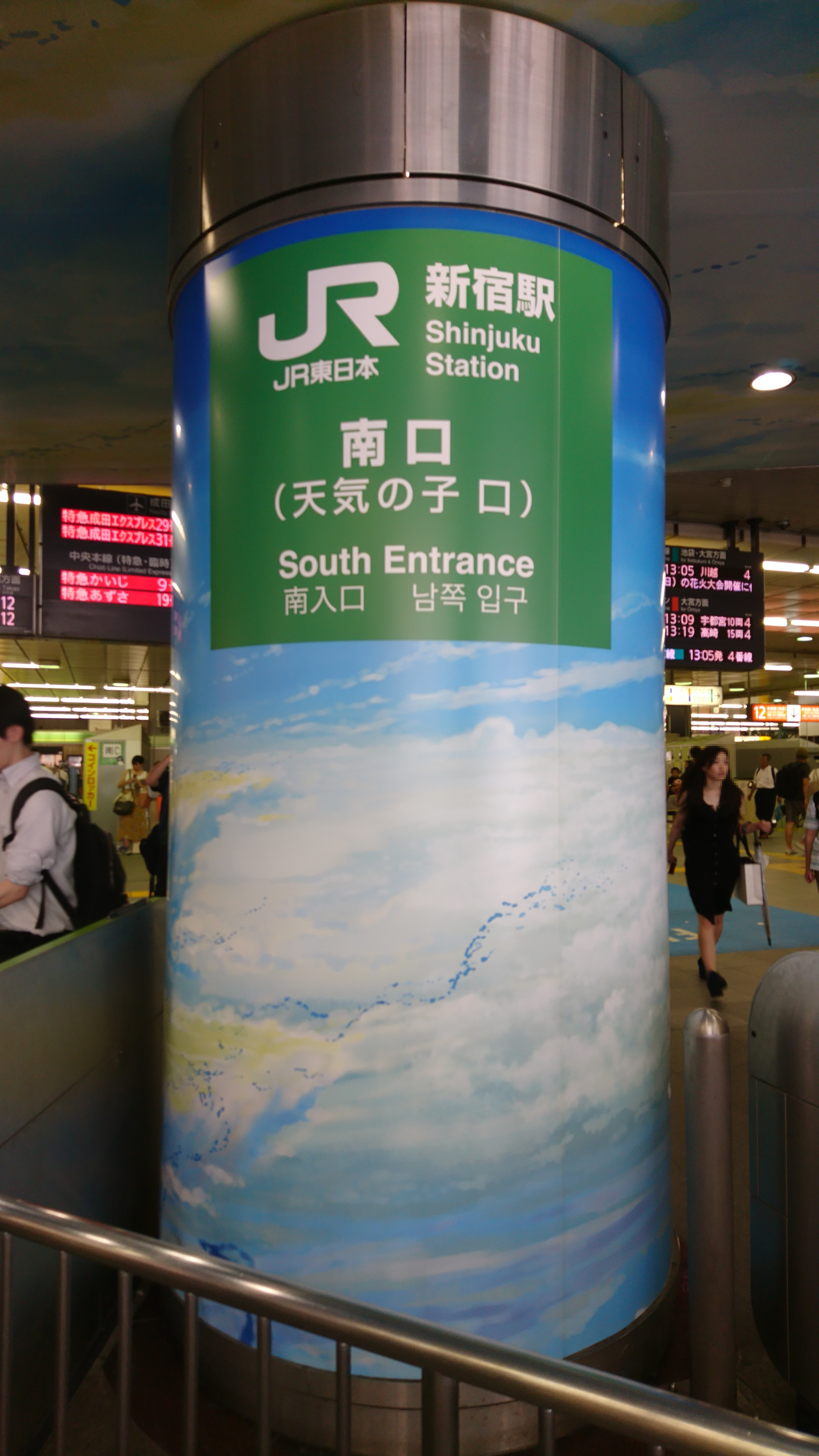
View of the South Exit of JR Shinjuku Station (Weather Channel) featuring a Weathering with You key visual
Shots used in the film
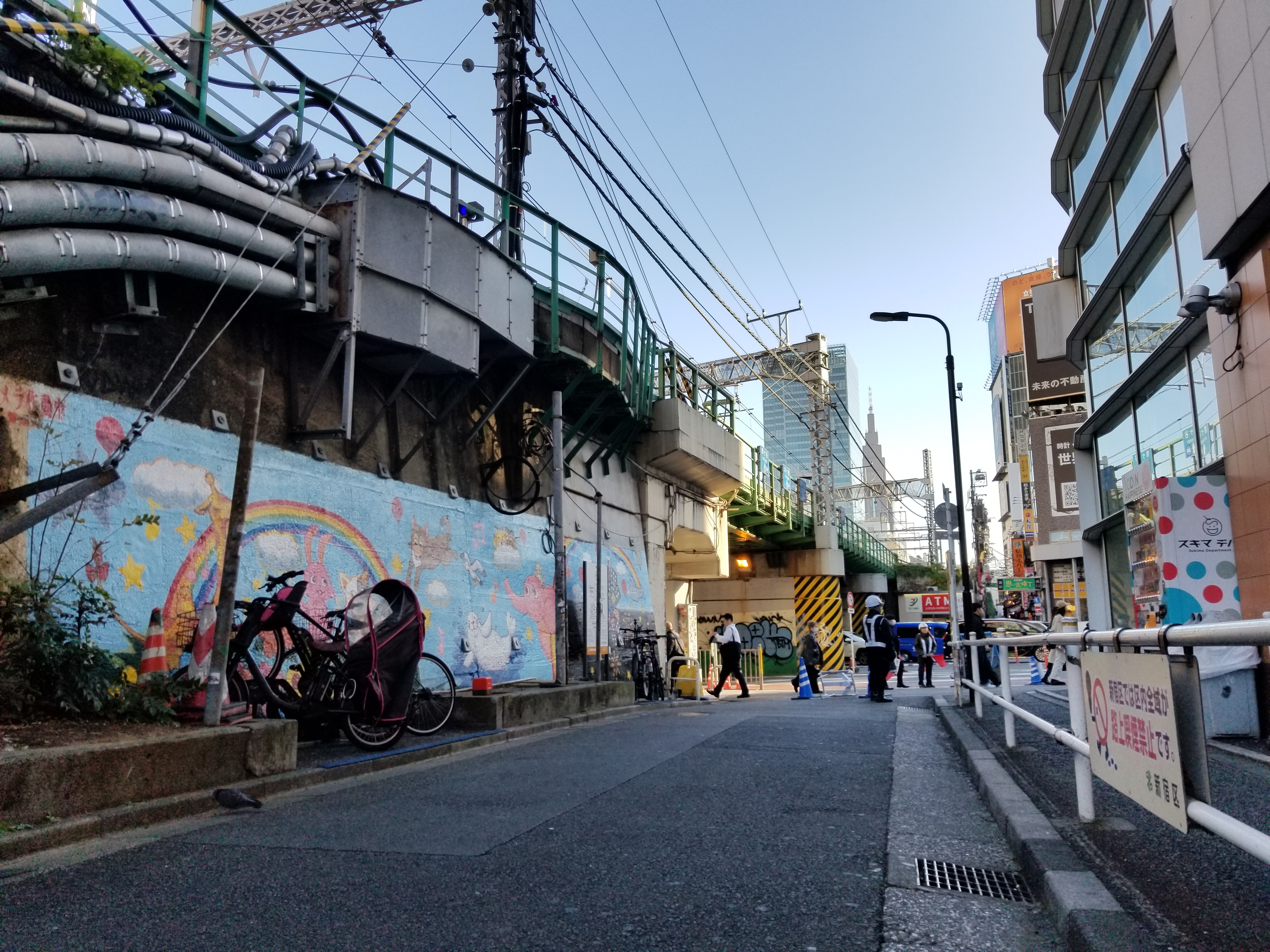
Alley between the Yamanote Line and Shinjuku Kaleido Building, featured in an early police investigation scene.

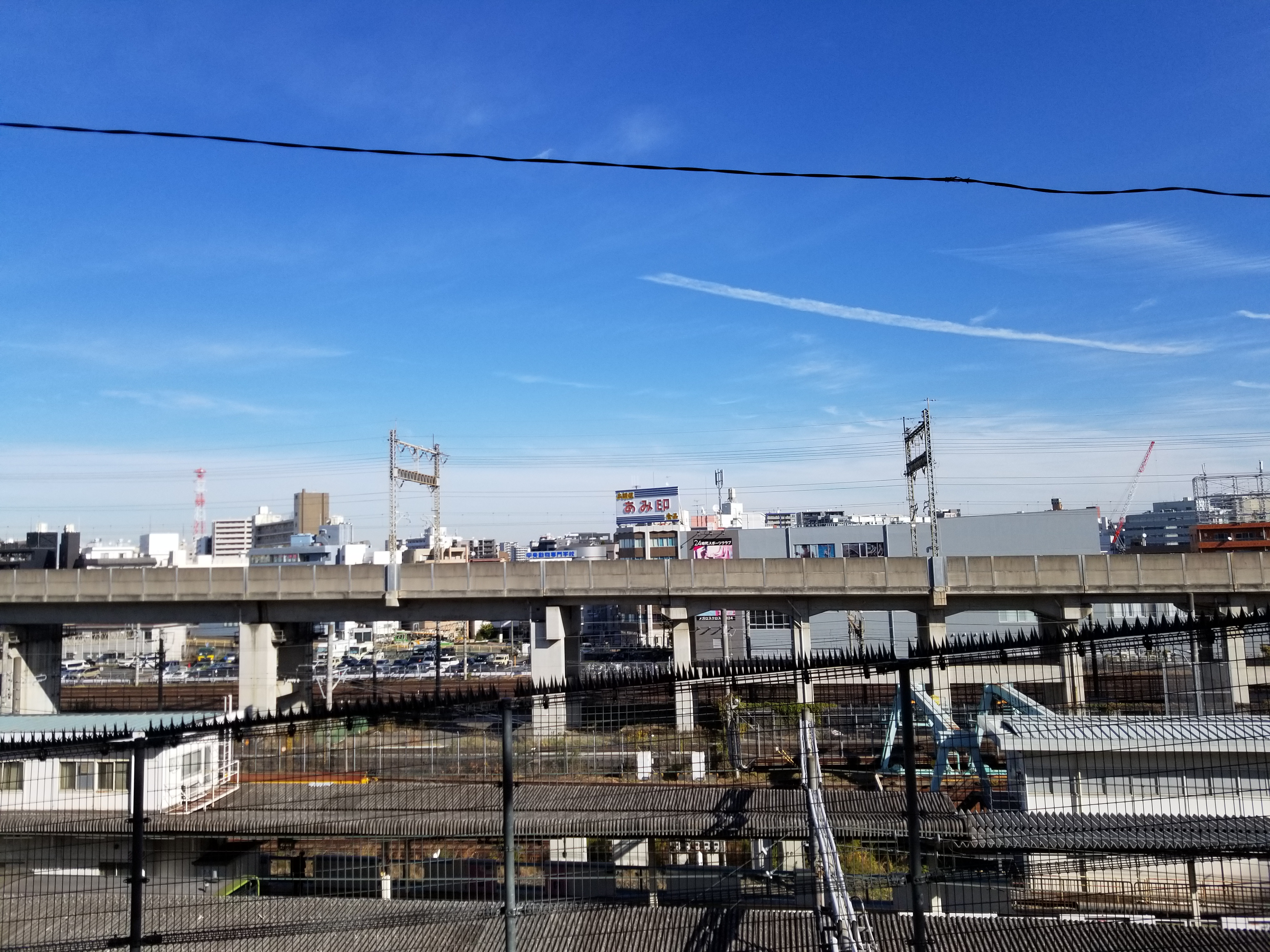
View of Higashitabata from the South Exit of Tabata Station, which served as the backdrop for a walking Hodaka before the closing scene.

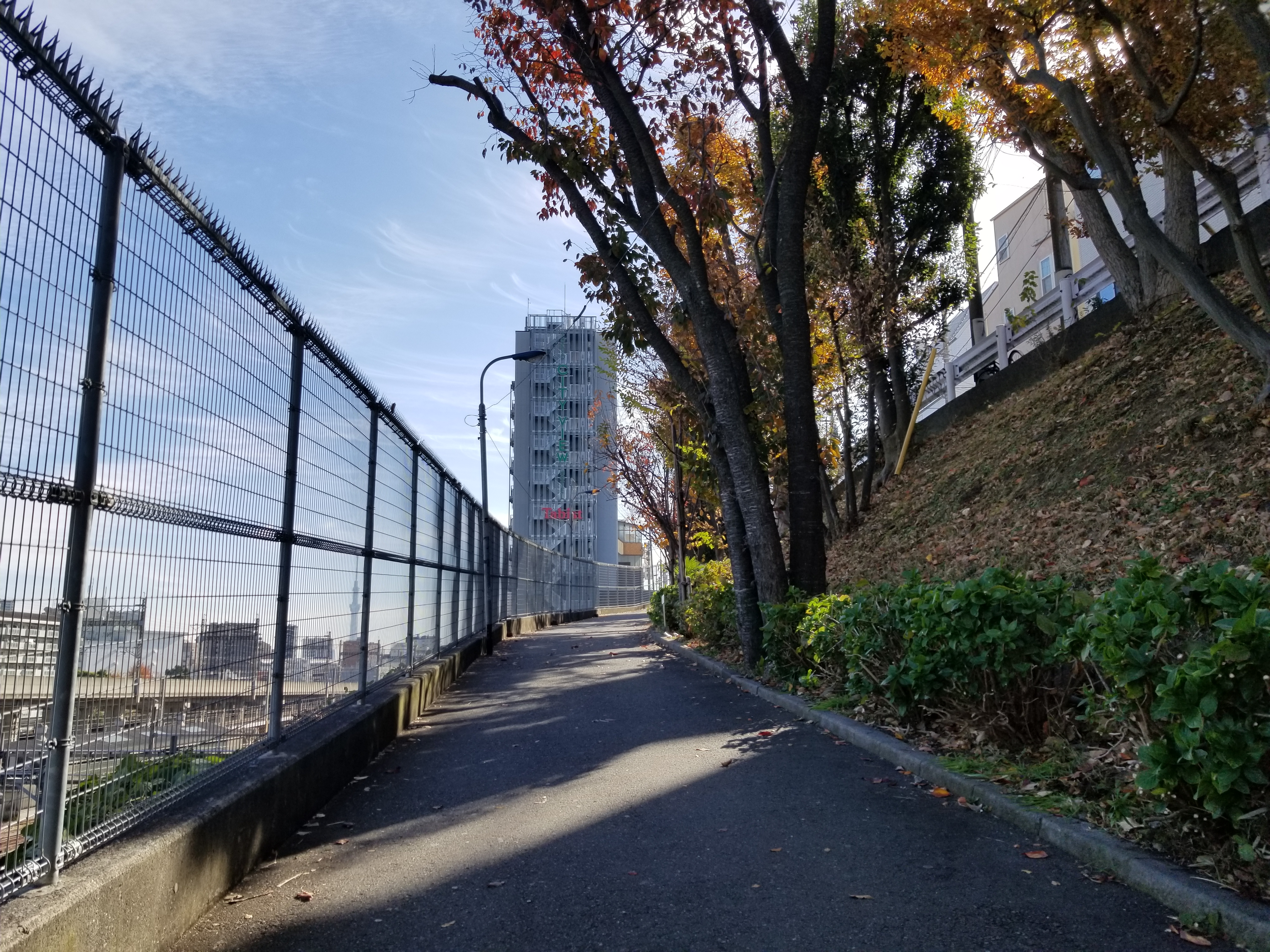
The pedestrian path near the South Exit of Tabata Station, where Hodaka sees Hina in the closing scene.

== See also ==
- List of highest-grossing animated films
- List of highest-grossing anime films
- List of highest-grossing films in Japan
- Cinema of Japan
- List of submissions to the 92nd Academy Awards for Best International Feature Film
- List of Japanese submissions for the Academy Award for Best International Feature Film
