= Love Begins in the World of If =

2025 Japanese Boys' Love television series

- Promotional poster
- if の世界で恋がはじまる
- Genre: Romantic drama; Boys' Love
- Based on: "If no Sekai de Koi ga Hajimaru" by Sachi Umino
- Written by: Shimo Ayumi
- Directed by: Hariu Yuji; Yasukawa Tokuhiro
- Starring: Kotaro Daigo; Daisuke Nakagawa
- Opening theme: "Around I" by 36km/h
- Ending theme: "Secret" by Unfair Rule
- Composer: Sakamoto Hidekazu
- Country of origin: Japan
- Original language: Japanese
- No. of seasons: 1
- No. of episodes: 6

Production
- Executive producer: Culture Entertainment
- Running time: 30 minutes
- Production company: Union Film

Original release
- Network: MBS
- Release: 21 November – 26 December 2025

Love Begins in the World of If (Japanese: if の世界で恋がはじまる, transl. If no Sekai de Koi ga Hajimaru) is a Japanese romantic drama Boys' Love television series directed by Hariu Yuji and written by Shimo Ayumi. Starring Kotaro Daigo and Daisuke Nakagawa, the series premiered on November 21, 2025, on MBS, and is also available internationally on Viki, GagaOOLala, and TVer. The series is based on the original novel of the same name written by Sachi Umino.

== Synopsis ==
After wishing for a different life, a reserved office worker awakens in a parallel world. In this alternate reality, he becomes confident and enters a romantic relationship with the colleague he has long admired, highlighting the contrast between his ordinary existence and the new world.

== Cast ==
=== Main ===
- Kotaro Daigo as Kano Akihito
- Daisuke Nakagawa as Ogami Seiji

=== Supporting ===
- Yuki Okamoto as Ryota Tomioka (sales department employee)
- Sojiro Yoshimura as Kaito Uchida (sales department senior)
- Mamoru Hagiwara as Kentaro Iwase (sales department employee)
- Kazunari Tosa as Tadashi Fukushima (sales department manager)
- Kaoru Kobayashi as Gaku Ibushi (Akihito's client)

== Broadcast ==
The series is broadcast in Japan on MBS and streamed internationally via Viki, GagaOOLala, and TVer.

== Reception ==
On Viki, the series has a rating of 8.5/10 from over 250 reviews.

Japanese media outlets also covered the release. Eiga.com reported on the premiere and initial reception, while TV Guide analyzed the narrative concept of parallel worlds.

In Brazil, specialized dorama websites such as Lazer Sem Fronteiras and Aiigo Doramas highlighted the show as part of the growing presence of Japanese BL dramas in 2025.
