= Yong Mei =

Chinese actress (born 1970)

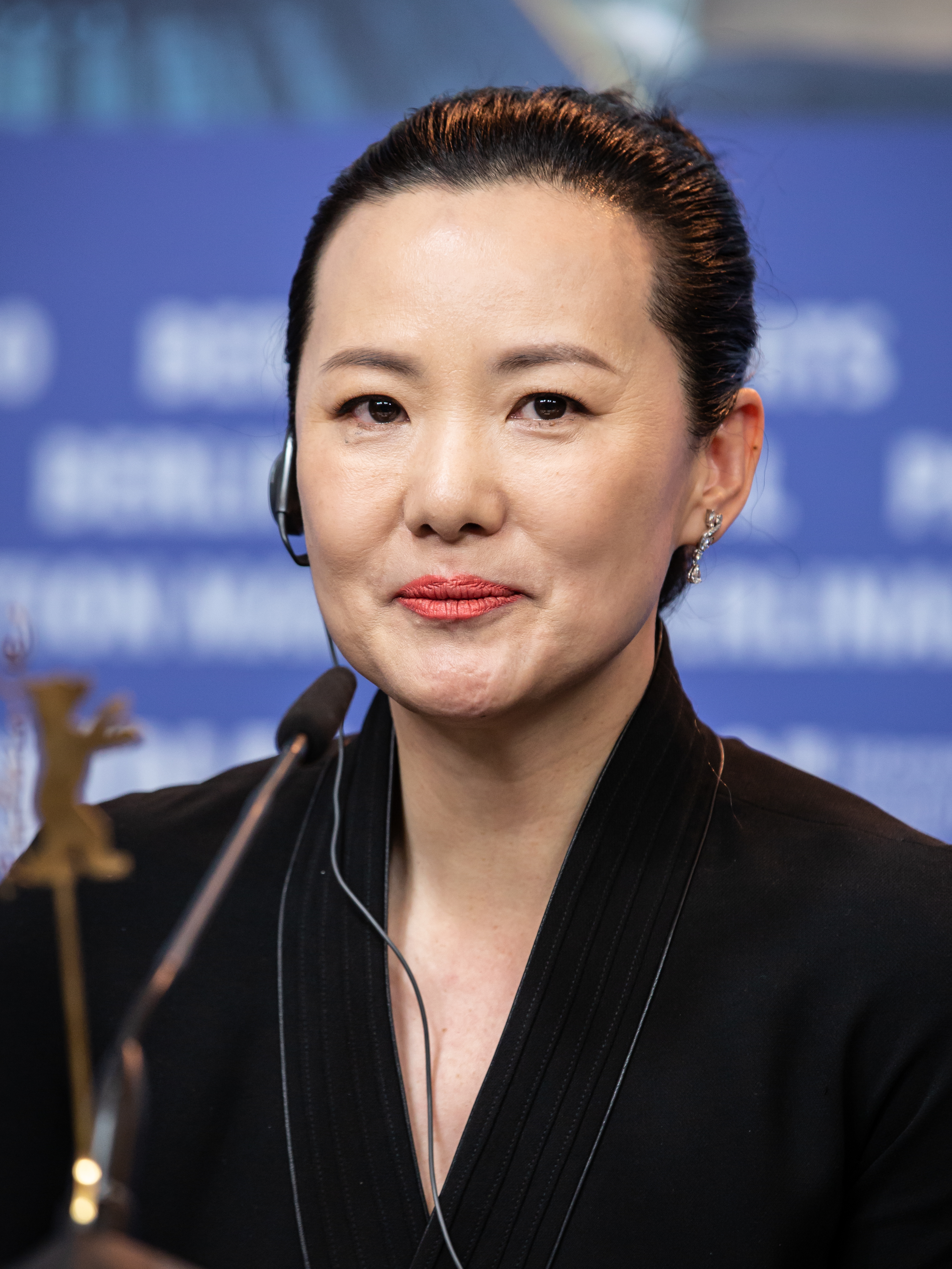
- Yong Mei at the 69th Berlin International Film Festival
- Born: 14 February 1970 (age 56); Hohhot, Inner Mongolia, China
- Education: University of International Business and Economics
- Occupation: Actress
- Years active: 1997–present
- Awards: Silver Bear for Best Actress (2019)

Chinese name
- Chinese: 咏梅
Transcriptions
Standard Mandarin
- Hanyu Pinyin: Yǒng Méi

Yong Mei (Chinese: 咏梅; born 14 February 1970) is a Chinese actress. In 2019, she won the Silver Bear for Best Actress at the 69th Berlin International Film Festival for her performance in the film So Long, My Son directed by Wang Xiaoshuai.

== Early life and education ==
An ethnic Mongol, Yong Mei was born on 14 February 1970 in Hohhot, the capital of China's Inner Mongolia Autonomous Region. Her original name in Mongolian is Sunjidma (Mongolian: ᠰᠦᠨᠵᠢᠳᠮ ᠠ, Сүнжидмаа, Sünžidmaa, Mongolian pronunciation: [suntʃitmaː], Chinese: 森吉德玛; pinyin: Sēnjídémǎ), meaning "fairy", which has given rise to her nickname "Sister Fairy" (Chinese: 仙姐儿; pinyin: xiānjiěr). She studied business administration at the University of International Business and Economics in Beijing, where she was active in performing arts.

== Career ==
After graduation from university, she initially worked in foreign trade, and later in the studio of the influential television hostess Xu Gehui (许戈辉). On the recommendation of Xu, Yong Mei starred in the 1997 television drama The Man Who Herds the Clouds (牧云的男人) and began her acting career. She had her breakout role in the 2004 television drama A Chinese-style Divorce (中国式离婚), which made her wildly popular. She was also praised for her performances in the TV series Cell Phone (手机), Ocean Paradise (海洋天堂), You Are My Lover (你是我爱人), and Cliff (悬崖, 2012).

In 2015, Yong Mei appeared in Hou Hsiao-hsien's film The Assassin (or Assassin Nie Yinniang), in which she plays the mother of the title character, Nie Yinniang. The production lasted from 2012 to 2014; she thoroughly enjoyed the experience and held the film in high regard. She did not accept a major role for the next few years for lack of a suitable script that met her standard for quality.

The next major film she appeared in was So Long, My Son, directed by Wang Xiaoshuai, in which she portrays a mother who has lost her only son. To prepare for the role, she interviewed a real-life mother who had lost her only child. She originally scheduled two hours for the interview, but it was eventually extended to seven hours and gave her deep insight into a mother's sorrow. The film premiered at the 69th Berlin International Film Festival on 14 February 2019, Yong Mei's 49th birthday. For their performance, Yong Mei and Wang Jingchun, who plays her husband in the film, were awarded the Silver Bear for Best Actress and Best Actor, respectively. She was the first actress from mainland China to win the award.

== Personal life ==
Yong Mei is married to Luan Shu, the former lead singer of the Beijing rock band Black Panther. She became a fan of the band after being introduced to its music by a friend, and starred in the music video for its song "Don't Break My Heart".

== Filmography ==
=== Film ===
Year	English title	Chinese title	Role	Notes
2000	A Lingering Face	非常夏日	Foreman	
2000	Piao zai haishang de xue	飘在海上的雪	Liang Xiaoling	
2002	Longtao	龙套	Song Xing	
2003	Cell Phone	手机	Xiao Su	
2010	Ocean Heaven	海洋天堂	Principal Tan	
2010	Aftershock	唐山大地震	Fang twins' aunt	
2011	Wo de xiatian	我的夏天	Liao Chenxue	
2013	Young Style	青春派	Mother	
2014	One Day	有一天	Mother of left-behind children	Segment Present
2015	The Assassin	刺客聂隐娘	Lady Nie Tian	Nominated for Best Supporting Actress at the Chinese Film Media Awards
2017	Secret Fruit	秘果	Mother Yu	
2018	Genghis Khan	战神纪	Hoelun	
2019	So Long, My Son	地久天长	Wang Liyun	Won the Silver Bear for Best Actress and the Golden Rooster Award for Best Actress
2021	Schemes in Antiques	古董局中局	Shen	
2024	Like a Rolling Stone	出走的决心	Li Hong	Based on the true story of Su Min

=== Television ===
Year	English title	Chinese title	Role	Notes
1995	Mu Yun's Man	牧云的男人	Mu Yun	
1996	Rizhao nuren xin	日照女人心		
1997	Beijing Love Story	北京爱情故事	Mo Huan	
1998	Silk Street	秀水街	Qimei	
1999	Feng die yu ren	疯蝶雨人	Roland	
1999	Supreme Honor	至高荣誉	Xia Jie	
1999	The Place Where Dreams Start	梦开始的地方	Xin Pingping	
2000	Wenzhou Woman	温州女人	Ami	
2000	Secretary of the Party Committee	县委书记	Shen Lihong	
2001	Mantra	真言	Anyang	
2001	Bangkok Rainy Season	曼谷雨季	Bu Yilan	
2001	Stacking Emotions	堆积情感	Liu Li	
2001	Langji tianya	浪迹天涯	Qinfang	
2001	Past and Present	前世今生	Xianglan/ Duan Xiaoyu	
2002	Not Far Away	相邻不远	Mu Yun	
2002	Qianlong Dynasty	乾隆王朝	Su Qinglian	
2002	Loyal Guard	忠诚卫士	Ouyang Yurong	
2002	Don't Come Near Me	不要靠近我	Meng Yue	
2003	Walk Through Happiness	走过幸福	Fang Fang	
2003	Blue Bird Sky	青鸟的天空	Lin Ping	
2003	Chinese Divorce	中国式离婚	Xiao Li	
2004	When Marriage Comes to an End	当婚姻走到尽头	Shan Lingling	
2005	Student Abroad	小留学生	Mrs. Ye	
2006	Yi hei zhi hei	以黑治黑	Shen Lihong	
2006	Dutiful Son	孝子	Xie Yan	
2006	Suochun	锁春记	Chawandan	
2007	Where is My Home	何处是我家	Han Rusu	
2007	Half of Heaven	一半天堂	Chen Xiaoning	
2008	Ruguo hai you mingtian	如果还有明天	Leng Wei	
2008	Newcomers to the Middle-Aged	人到中年	Jiang Ning	
2009	Shan bei hanzi	陕北汉子	Ulanzhu	
2010	Zhongdiangongmen	钟点工们	Liu Li	
2010	Zong you qingkong	总有晴空	Chawandan	
2011	Cliff	悬崖	Sun Yuejian	
2011	Ni shi wo airen	你是我爱人	Chen Xiaoning	
2011	Ernu de zhanzheng	儿女的战争	Leng Wei	
2012	Luanshi shuxiang	乱世书香	Jiang Ning	
2016	Xiao bieli	小别离	Ulanzhu	
2019	A Little Reunion	小欢喜	Liu Jing	Nominated for Best Supporting Actress in a TV Series at the Shanghai Television Festival
2021	LouYang	风起洛阳	The Emperor	

== Awards and nominations ==
Year	Award	Category	Project	Result	Ref.
2004	China TV Golden Eagle Awards	Audience's Choice for Actress	Loyal Guardian	Nominated	
2006	China TV Golden Eagle Awards	Audience's Choice for Actress	Chinese Style Divorce	Nominated	
2016	Chinese Film Media Awards	Best Supporting Actress	The Assassin	Nominated	
2019	Berlin International Film Festival	Silver Bear for Best Actress	So Long, My Son	Won	
2019	Golden Rooster Awards	Best Actress	So Long, My Son	Won	
2020	Asian Film Awards	Best Actress	So Long, My Son	Nominated	
2019	Chinese Film Media Awards	Best Actress	So Long, My Son	Nominated	
2019	Asia Pacific Screen Awards	Best Performance by an Actress	So Long, My Son	Nominated	
2020	China Film Director's Guild Awards	Best Actress	So Long, My Son	Nominated	
2020	Shanghai Television Festival	Best Supporting Actress in a Television Series	A Little Reunion	Nominated	
2024	Silk Road International Film Festival	Golden Silk Road Award for Best Actress	Like a Rolling Stone	Won	
2025	Beijing College Student Film Festival	Favorite Actress	Like a Rolling Stone	Won	
2025	China Film Director's Guild Awards	Best Actress	Like a Rolling Stone	Won	
2025	Changchun Film Festival	Best Actress	Like a Rolling Stone	Nominated	
2025	Golden Rooster Awards	Best Actress	Like a Rolling Stone	Nominated	
