= Zhao Xiaoli (actress) =

Chinese actress

- Born: 1975 (age 50–51); Luzhou, Sichuan, China
- Occupation: Sichuan opera actress
- Years active: 2019—present

Chinese name
- Traditional Chinese: 趙小利
- Simplified Chinese: 赵小利
Transcriptions
Standard Mandarin
- Hanyu Pinyin: Zhào Xiǎolì

Zhao Xiaoli (Chinese: 赵小利; born 1975 in Luzhou) is a Chinese Sichuan opera actress.

In 2019, she won the Asian New Talent: Best Actress award at the 22nd Shanghai International Film Festival and was nominated at 32nd Golden Rooster Awards for Best Actress for her performance in the film To Live to Sing directed by Johnny Ma.

== Filmography ==
- To Live to Sing (活着唱着) (2019)

== Awards and nominations ==
Year	Award	Category	Nominated work	Result
2019	22nd Shanghai International Film Festival	Asian New Talent Award: Best Actress	To Live to Sing	Won
2019	32nd Golden Rooster Awards	Best Actress	To Live to Sing	Nominated
