= To Live to Sing =

2019 film

- Film poster
- Directed by: Johnny Ma
- Written by: Johnny Ma
- Produced by: Jing Wang; Wu Xianjian
- Starring: Gan Guidan; Yan Xihu; Zhao Xiaoli
- Cinematography: Matthias Delvaux
- Edited by: Ana Godoy
- Music by: You Jong-ho; Kim Ji-min; Reggie Ba-Pe III
- Distributed by: Epicentre Films
- Release date: 20 May 2019 (Cannes)
- Running time: 105 minutes
- Countries: China; Canada
- Language: Mandarin

To Live to Sing (Chinese: 活着唱着; pinyin: Huózhe chàngzhe) is a 2019 Chinese-Canadian drama film directed by Johnny Ma. It was screened in the Directors' Fortnight section at the 2019 Cannes Film Festival. The film won both Best Film and Best Actress at the 2019 Shanghai International Film Festival.

== Cast ==
- Zhao Xiaoli
- Gan Guidan
- Yan Xihu
