= Rikiya =

- Gender: Male

Origin
- Origin: Japanese
- Meaning: Different meanings depending on the kanji used

Rikiya (written: 力也 or 力哉) is a masculine Japanese given name. Notable people with the name include:

- Rikiya Higashihara (東原 力哉; born 1956), Japanese jazz drummer
- Rikiya Kawamae (川前 力也; born 1971), Japanese footballer
- Rikiya Koyama (小山 力也; born 1963), Japanese actor and voice actor
- Rikiya Motegi (茂木 力也; born 1996), Japanese footballer
- Rikiya Otaka (大高 力也; born 1991), Japanese actor
- Rikiya Yasuoka (安岡 力也; 1947–2012), Japanese actor and singer

== Fictional characters ==
- Rikiya Yotsubashi, also known as Re-Destro, an antagonist from My Hero Academia
- Rikiya Shimabukuro, character from Yakuza 3
