= Kotaro Daigo =

Japanese voice actor (born 2000)

- 醍醐 虎汰朗
- Born: 1 September 2000 (age 26); Tokyo, Japan
- Occupation: Actor
- Years active: 2017–present
- Employer: A-Light
- Notable work: Hodaka Morishima in Weathering with You
- Website: daigo-kotaro.com

Kotaro Daigo (Japanese: 醍醐 虎汰朗, Hepburn: Daigo Kotarō; born 1 September 2000) is a Japanese actor affiliated with A-Light. He had a leading role for the film Weathering with You.

== Early life and career ==
Daigo was born in Tokyo on 1 September 2000. Originally part of the junior high school soccer team, he left and started a career in acting because he had long admired the entertainment industry.

Daigo starred in the Yowamushi Pedal stage adaptations, starring as Sakamichi Onoda in the production for Yowamushi Pedal Shin Interhigh-hen: Start Line between February and March 2017. He later reprised his role in Yowamushi Pedal Shin Interhigh-hen: Heat Up in October 2017, and Yowamushi Pedal Shin Interhigh-hen: Hakone Gakuen Ōja Fukukaku in March 2018. He was replaced by Taishu Nukanobu for the stage play Yowamushi Pedal Shin Interhigh-hen: Limit Breaker in May 2019.

In November 2018, Daigo was cast in a leading role for Makoto Shinkai's anime film Weathering with You. He and co-star Nana Mori were chosen from among two thousand auditions to play the main characters. In 2020, he won the Seiyu Awards for Best Rookie Actor at the 14th Seiyu Awards.

In 2019, he starred in the asadora Maiagare!. He and Hiroki Miura played Haku in the 2022 stage adaptation of Spirited Away and its August 2023 encore at the Misono-za in Nagoya. In March 2023, he was cast as Yusuke Ogino, the main character of the 2023 drama adaptation of Ciguatera.

== Filmography ==
=== Film ===
Year	Title	Role	Notes	Ref(s)
2019	The Battle: Roar to Victory	Yukio		
2019	Weathering with You	Hodaka Morishima (voice)	Lead role	
2020	#HandballStrive	Okamoto		
2020	The Brightest Roof in the Universe	Makoto Sasagawa		
2022	Re/Member	Shōta Uranishi		
2023	Out	Atsushi Tanzawa		
2025	The Sickness Unto Love	Akira Nezuhara		
2025	Re/Member: The Last Night	Shōta Uranish		
2025	Romantic Killer			
2026	Match Monde	Mikio Tokura	Lead role	
2027	Prism			

=== Television ===
Year	Title	Role	Notes	Ref(s)
2019	Soar High!	Daisei Yoshida	Asadora	
2023	Ciguatera	Yusuke Ogino		
2025	Alice in Borderland	Nobuaki Hida	Season 3	
2025	Love Begins in the World of If	Akihito Kano	Lead role	

== Stage ==
=== Theater ===
Year	Title	Role	Notes	Ref(s)
2017	Yowamushi Pedal Shin Interhigh-hen: Start Line	Sakamichi Onoda		
2017	Yowamushi Pedal Shin Interhigh-hen: Heat Up	Sakamichi Onoda		
2018	Yowamushi Pedal Shin Interhigh-hen: Hakone Gakuen Ōja Fukukaku	Sakamichi Onoda		
2022	Spirited Away	Haku		

== Awards and nominations ==
Year presented, name of the award ceremony, category, nominee(s) of the award, and the result of the nomination
Year	Award ceremony	Category	Nominated work(s)	Result	Ref.
2020	Seiyu Award	Best Rookie Actor		Won	
