= So Long, My Son =

2019 Chinese drama film

- Festival poster
- Traditional Chinese: 地久天長
- Simplified Chinese: 地久天长
- Literal meaning: long and enduring as the heavens and the earth
- Hanyu Pinyin: dìjiǔtiāncháng
- Jyutping: dei6gau2tin1coeng4
- Directed by: Wang Xiaoshuai
- Screenplay by: A Mei; Wang Xiaoshuai
- Story by: Wang Xiaoshuai
- Produced by: Liu Xuan
- Starring: Wang Jingchun; Yong Mei; Qi Xi; Roy Wang; Du Jiang; Ai Liya; Xu Cheng; Li Jingjing; Zhao Yanguozhang
- Cinematography: Kim Hyun-seok
- Edited by: Lee Chatametikool
- Music by: Dong Yingda
- Production companies: Dongchun Films; WXS Production
- Release dates: 14 February 2019 (Berlin); 22 March 2019 (China)
- Running time: 185 minutes
- Country: China
- Language: Mandarin

So Long, My Son (Chinese: 地久天长, or Di Jiu Tian Chang) is a 2019 Chinese drama film directed by Wang Xiaoshuai. It was selected to compete for the Golden Bear at the 69th Berlin International Film Festival. At the festival, the film won the two main acting awards, with Wang Jingchun and Yong Mei winning the Silver Bear for Best Actor and Actress, respectively.

== Plot ==
The film tells the story of two families over about thirty years: Liu Yaojun, Wang Liyun and their son Liu Xing ('Xingxing') together with Shen Yingming, Li Haiyan and their son Shen Hao ('Haohao'). Haohao and Xingxing were born on the same day. Both families were originally close and worked in the same factory, but became estranged in the 1980s.

Following the death of Xingxing, who drowned while playing by a reservoir with Haohao and other children, Yaojun and Liyun moved to another province (Fujian) and adopted a 'new' boy who they rename 'Xingxing', who grows estranged from his foster parents and leaves them as a young teenager. Yingming and Haiyan make a fortune in real estate and Haohao becomes a doctor.

When Haiyan is about to die, she invites Yaojun and Liyun to come back to their home town, which they hardly recognise after so much urban development. At the end, Haohao tells Xingxing's parents that he had forced Xingxing to play in the reservoir because the other kids were laughing at him and he felt embarrassed. Following this revelation, Liu Yaojun and Wang Liyun receive a phone call from their estranged, adopted son to say he is returning to visit them and bringing his new girlfriend.

The film portrays the journey of the two families with non-chronological flashbacks explaining the course of their lives. It speaks of affection, getting married, having and raising children (with the one-child policy), collective dismissal because of economic reform, ups and downs in life, grief and many social changes in China, resulting in complicated life experiences.

== Cast ==
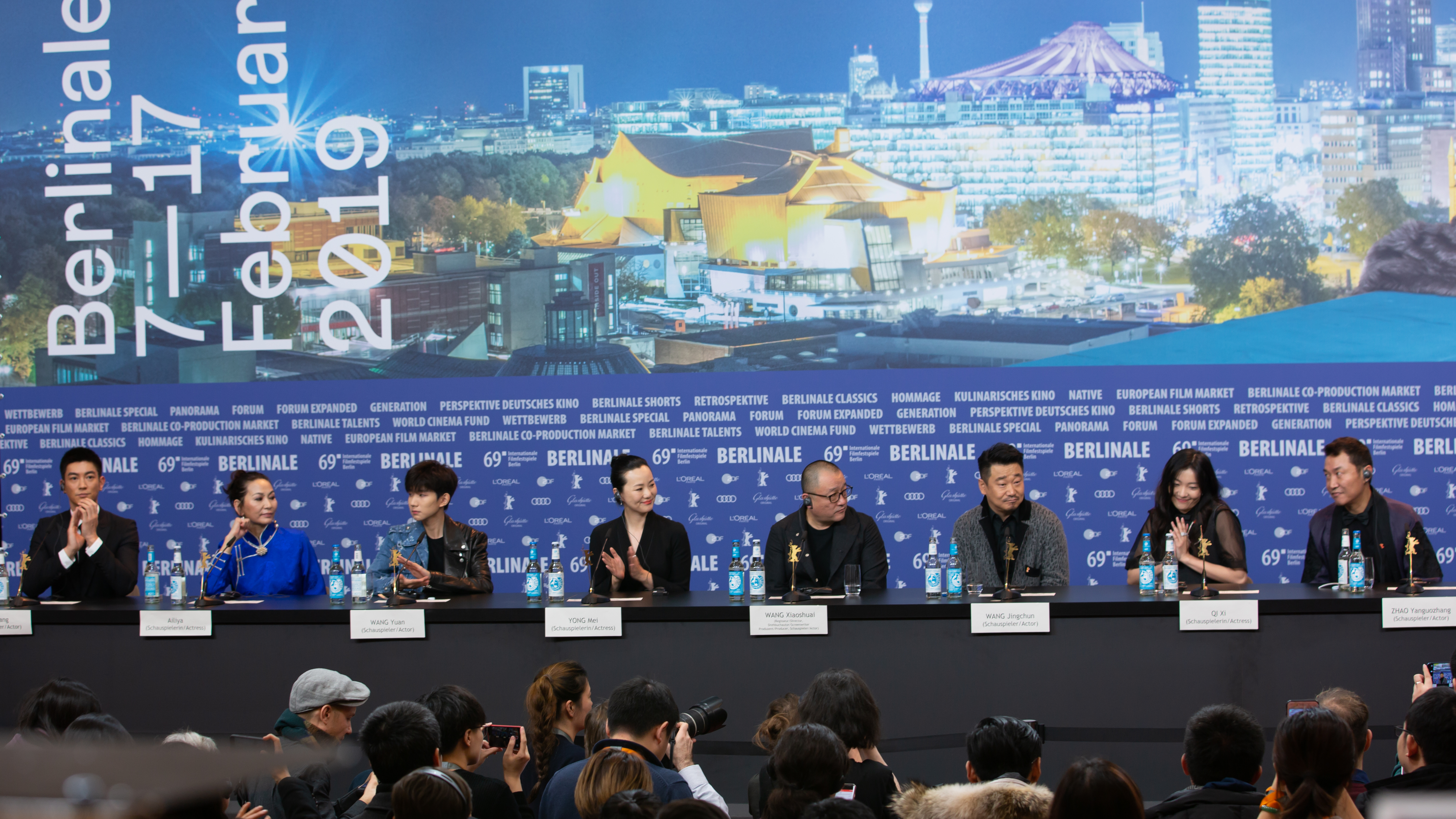
Press conference of the film crew at the Berlin Film Festival 2019.

- Wang Jingchun (as Liu Yaojun)
- Yong Mei (as Wang Liyun)
- Qi Xi (as Shen Moli, sister of Shen Yingming)
- Roy Wang (as Liu Xing, son of Liu Yaojun and Wang Liyun)
- Du Jiang (as Shen Hao, son of Shen Yingming and Li Haiyan)
- Ai Liya (as Li Haiyan)
- Xu Cheng (as Shen Yingming)
- Li Jingjing (as Gao Meiyu, who become wife of Zhang Xinjian)
- Zhao Yanguozhang (as Zhang Xinjian)

== Critical response ==
The film has a 100% rating on Rotten Tomatoes based on 35 reviews, with an average score of 8.6/10. The site's critical consensus reads, "Intimate in focus yet epic in size and scope, So Long, My Son sets a heartbreaking saga of family tragedy against the changing face of modern China."

== Awards and nominations ==
Year	Award	Category	Recipient	Result
2019	69th Berlin International Film Festival	Silver Bear for Best Actor	Wang Jingchun	Won
2019	69th Berlin International Film Festival	Silver Bear for Best Actress	Yong Mei	Won
2019	69th Berlin International Film Festival	Golden Bear	So Long, My Son	Nominated
2019	67th San Sebastián International Film Festival	Audience Award	So Long, My Son	Nominated
2019	32nd Golden Rooster Awards	Best Picture	So Long, My Son	Nominated
2019	32nd Golden Rooster Awards	Best Director	Wang Xiaoshuai	Nominated
2019	32nd Golden Rooster Awards	Best Writing	Wang Xiaoshuai and A Mei	Won
2019	32nd Golden Rooster Awards	Best Actor	Wang Jingchun	Won
2019	32nd Golden Rooster Awards	Best Actress	Yong Mei	Won
2019	Brussels International Film Festival (BRIFF)	Grand Prix, International Competition	So Long, My Son	Won
