= Soar High! =

- Genre: Drama
- Written by: Ryoko Kuwahara; Ureha Shimada; Ryota Tsukuda
- Directed by: Tadashi Tanaka; Yusuke Noda; Takayoshi Kotani; Kensuke Matsuki; Yohei Ono
- Starring: Haruka Fukuhara; You Yokoyama; Eiji Akaso; Mizuki Yamashita; Tomomitsu Yamaguchi; Rie Kuwabata; Ren Meguro; Mahiro Takasugi; Neru Nagahama; Naoki Matayoshi; Kosuke Suzuki; Show Aikawa; Koji Kikkawa; Hiromi Nagasaku; Katsunori Takahashi; Atsuko Takahata
- Narrated by: Masashi Sada
- Opening theme: "I Love You" by Back Number
- Composer: Harumi Fūki
- Country of origin: Japan
- Original language: Japanese
- No. of episodes: 126

Production
- Producer: Tadashi Uesugi
- Running time: 15 minutes
- Production company: NHK Osaka

Original release
- Network: NHK
- Release: October 3, 2022 – March 31, 2023

Soar High! (舞いあがれ!, Maiagare!) is a Japanese television drama series and the 107th Asadora series, following Chimudondon. It premiered on October 3, 2022, and concluded on March 31, 2023. Haruka Fukuhara was cast in the lead role of Mai Iwakura after an audition of 2545 women.

== Cast ==
=== Iwakura's family ===
- Haruka Fukuhara as Mai Iwakura
  - Haro Asano as young Mai
- Katsunori Takahashi as Kōta Iwakura, Mai's father
- Hiromi Nagasaku as Megumi Iwakura, Mai's mother
- You Yokoyama as Haruto Iwakura, Mai's brother
  - Saion Ebizuka as young Haruto
- Atsuko Takahata as Shōko Saitsu, Mai's grandmother and Megumi's mother

=== Mai's childhood friends ===
- Eiji Akaso as Takashi Umezu, Okonomiyaki restaurant "Umezu" owner's son
  - Kento Saitō as young Takashi
- Mizuki Yamashita as Kurumi Mochizuki, Mai's classmate
  - Saki Ōno as young Kurumi

=== Higashiosaka people ===
- Tomomitsu Yamaguchi as Masaru Umezu, Okonomiyaki restaurant "Umezu" owner, Takashi's father
- Rie Kawabata as Yukino Umezu, Okonomiyaki restaurant "Umezu" landlady, Takashi's mother
- Kanji Furutachi as Hisayuki Kasamaki, a worker at the factory run by Kōta
- Naoki Matayoshi as Iwao Yagi, the owner of second-hand bookstore "Derashine"
- Satoru Matsuo as Yoshiharu Mochizuki, Kurumi's father and former rugby player
- Seiko Takuma as Michiko Tsuda, a hostess of the café where Mai and Kurumi are working part-time

=== Goto Peninsula people ===
- Show Aikawa as Gō Kido, a shipwright
- Kosuke Suzuki as Shingo Ura, an office staff
- Neru Nagahama as Sakura Yamanaka, a woman selling jam made by Sachiko at the shop

=== Naniwa Birdman seniors ===
- Mahiro Takasugi as Hirofumi Kariya, 3rd year university student who is in charge of designing the human-powered aircraft "Swan"
- Ayako Yoshitani as Fūko Yura, 2nd year university student who is a pilot of the human-powered aircraft "Swan"
- Suguru Adachi as Aoi Tsuruta, 3rd year university student who is a circle representative

=== Aviation school people ===
- Ren Meguro as Hiroaki Kashiwagi, an elite who grew up in an aviation family
- Hirona Yamazaki as Rinko Yano, a returnee who worked at a trading company
- Shogo Hama as Shinichi Nakazawa, a man who quit his job because he could not give up on his dream of becoming a pilot
- Kotaro Daigo as Taisei Yoshida, a man who goes to school on a scholarship
- Hiroki Sano as Yūki Mizushima, Mizushima Store president's son
- Kōji Kikkawa as Mamoru Ōkōchi, an aviation instructor

== TV schedule ==
Week	Episodes	Title	Directed by	Original airdate	Rating
1	1–5	"Okāchan to Watashi" (お母ちゃんとわたし)	Tadashi Tanaka	October 3–7, 2022	15.9%
2	6–10	"Baramon-dako, Agare!" (ばらもん凧、あがれ！)	Yūsuke Noda	October 10–14, 2022	16.4%
3	11–15	"Ganbare! Otōchan" (がんばれ！お父ちゃん)	Tadashi Tanaka	October 17–21, 2022	16.1%
4	16–20	"Tsubasa ni Kakeru Seishun" (翼にかける青春)	Tadashi Tanaka	October 24–28, 2022	16.0%
5	21–25	"Sora o Tobitai!" (空を飛びたい！)	Tadashi Tanaka	October 30–November 4, 2022	15.2%
6	26–30	"Swan-gō no Kiseki" (スワン号の奇跡)	Takayoshi Kotani	November 7–11, 2022	15.6%
7	31–35	"Pilot ni Naritai!" (パイロットになりたい！)	Tadashi Tanaka	November 14–18, 2022	15.5%
8	36–40	"Iza, Kōkū-gakkō e!" (いざ、航空学校へ！)	Yūsuke Noda	November 21–25, 2022	15.6%
9	41–45	"Watashira wa Team ya" (私らはチームや)	Kensuke Matsuki	November 28–December 2, 2022	15.5%
10	46–50	"Wakare to Hatsukoi" (別れと初恋)	Yūsuke Noda	December 5–9, 2022	15.6%
11	51–55	"Egao no Flight" (笑顔のフライト)	Kensuke Matsuki	December 12–16, 2022	15.9%
12	56–60	"Tsubasa wo Yasumeru Tori" (翼を休める鳥)	Takayoshi Kotani	December 19–23, 2022	15.6%
13	61–63	"Mukai-kaze no Naka de" (向かい風の中で)	Tadashi Tanaka	December 26–28, 2022	?
14	64–66	"Chichi no Senaka" (父の背中)	Tadashi Tanaka	January 4–6, 2023	?
15	67–71	"Ketsudan no Toki" (決断の時)	Tadashi Tanaka	January 9–13, 2023	15.7%
16	72–76	"Haha to Watashi no Chōsen" (母と私の挑戦)	Hyōji Harada	January 16–20, 2023	16.0%
17	77–81	"Ōkina Yume ni Mukatte" (大きな夢に向かって)	Yūsuke Noda	January 23–27, 2023	16.2%
18	82–86	"Oyako no Kokoro" (親子の心)	Yūsuke Noda	January 30–February 3, 2023	16.2%
19	87–91	"Kokuhaku" (告白)	Takayoshi Kotani	February 6–10, 2023	16.1%
20	92–96	"Tsutaetai Omoi" (伝えたい思い)	Takafumi Kudō	February 13–17, 2023	15.9%
21	97–101	"Aratana Shuppatsu" (新たな出発)	Tadashi Tanaka	February 20–24, 2023	16.0%
22	102–106	"Bōken no Hajimari" (冒険のはじまり)	Takayoshi Kotani	February 27–March 3, 2023	16.0%
23	107–111	"Hiyaku no Chance" (飛躍のチャンス)	Hisashi Ogawa	March 6–10, 2023	15.7%
24	112–116	"Banba no Ayumi" (ばんばの歩み)	Yūsuke Noda	March 13–17, 2023	15.6%
25	117–121	"Mirai wo Shinjite" (未来を信じて)	Yōhei Ōno	March 20–24, 2023	12.7%
26	122–126	"Watashi-tachi no Tsubasa" (私たちの翼)	Tadashi Tanaka	March 27–31, 2023	15.4%
Average rating 15.6% - Rating is based on Japanese Video Research (Kantō region).

Preceded by Chimudondon	Asadora; October 3, 2022 – March 31, 2023	Succeeded by Ranman
