= A First Farewell =

Chinese film by Lina Wang

- Directed by: Lina Wang
- Written by: Lina Wang
- Cinematography: Li Yong
- Edited by: Matthieu Laclau
- Music by: Xi Wen
- Production companies: A Shanghai Eternity Media & Culture Co. Tencent Pictures; Mango TV; Beijing Medoc Film Group; Emei Film Group; Shanghai Bridgestream
- Release date: 2018
- Running time: 86 minutes
- Languages: Uyghur, Mandarin
- Box office: CN¥214 Million

A First Farewell (Chinese: 第一次的离别; pinyin: Dì yī cì de líbié) is a 2018 Chinese docudrama film written and directed by Lina Wang. Set in Xinjiang, the film follows three Uyghur children and their families who face challenges due to the persecution of Uyghurs in China.

== See also ==
- Uyghur people
