= Wang Jingchun =

Chinese actor

- 王景春
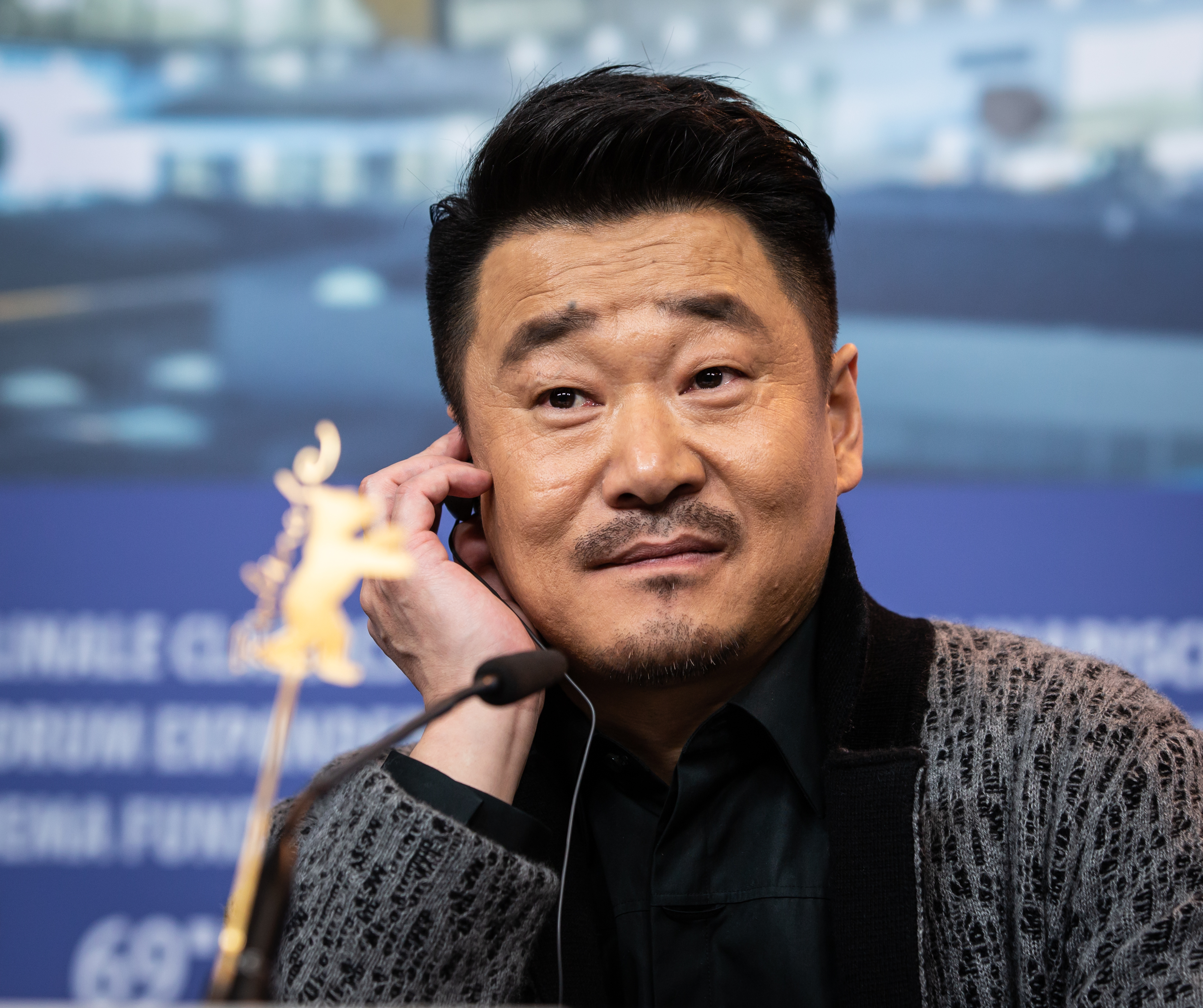
- Wang at Berlinale 2019
- Born: 12 February 1973 (age 53); Altay City, Xinjiang, China
- Education: Shanghai Theatre Academy
- Occupation: Actor
- Years active: 1998–present
- Spouse: Li Jing

Wang Jingchun (Chinese: 王景春; born 12 February 1973) is a Chinese actor.

== Awards ==
He won the Best Actor Award at the Tokyo International Film Festival in 2013 for his performance in Ning Ying's film To Live and Die in Ordos. In 2019, he won the Silver Bear for Best Actor at the 69th Berlin International Film Festival for his role in Wang Xiaoshuai's film So Long, My Son, while his co-star Yong Mei won the Silver Bear for Best Actress.
