= List of awards and nominations received by Zhou Xun =

Zhou Xun awards and nominations
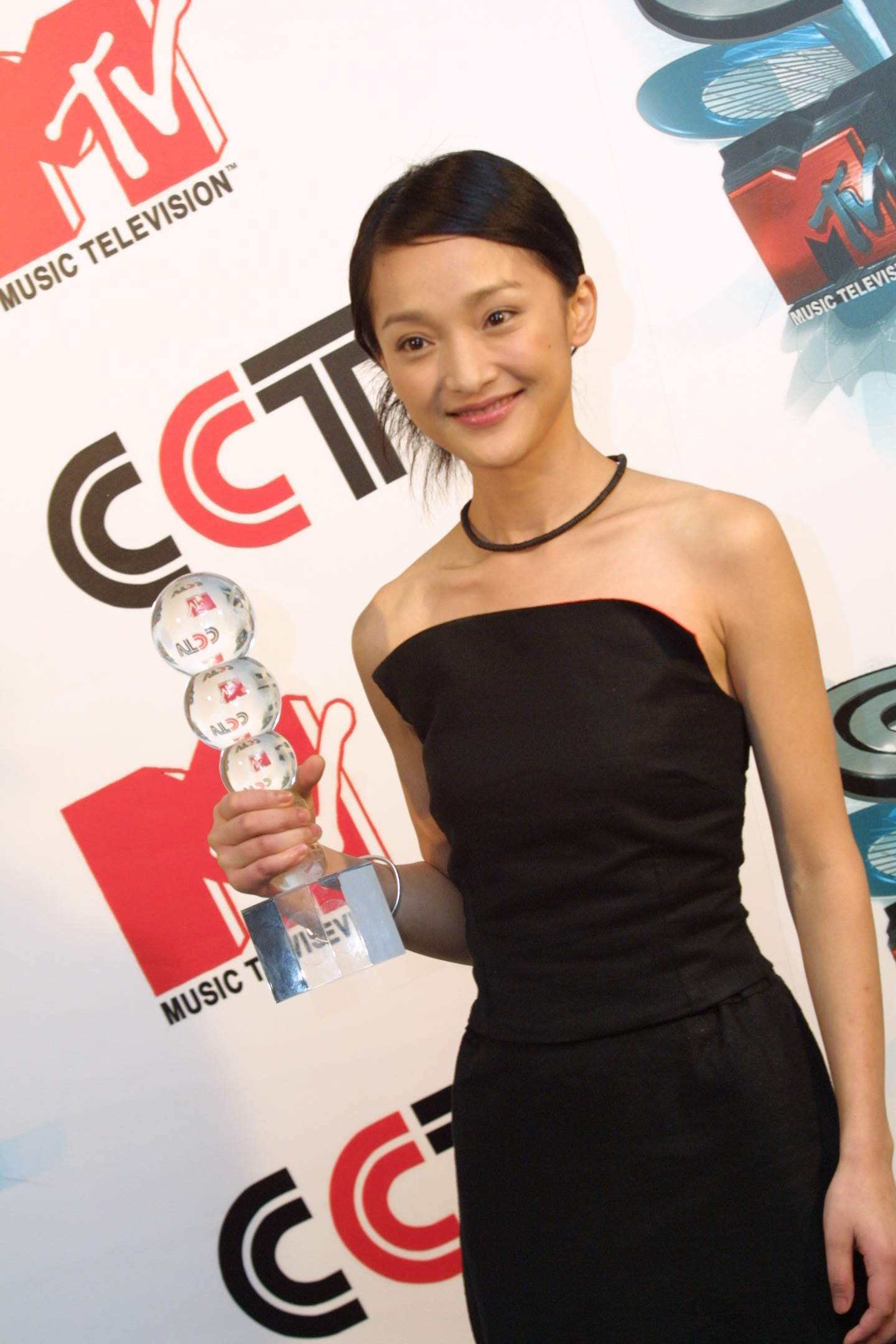
- Zhou at the MTV Movie Awards in Beijing 2002
Award	Wins	Nominations
Asian Film Awards	1	1
Asia-Pacific Film Festival	0	2
Beijing College Student Film Festival	4	6
Golden Bauhinia Awards	2	2
Golden Horse Film Festival and Awards	2	7
Golden Rooster Awards	1	2
Hong Kong Film Awards	2	9
Hundred Flowers Awards	1	3

This is a list of awards and nominations received by Chinese actress Zhou Xun. She has received multiple awards and nominations for her work. In 2009, she became the first Chinese actor to win the "Grand Slam", after winning the three biggest film awards, the Golden Horse Awards, the Hong Kong Film Awards and the Golden Rooster Awards.

== Film ==
=== Abuja International Film Festival ===
Year	Award	Category	Nominated work	Result	Ref.
2011	8th	Outstanding Female Actress	The Equation of Love and Death	Won	

=== Asian Film Awards ===
Year	Award	Category	Nominated work	Result	Ref.
2008	3rd	Best Actress	The Equation of Love and Death	Won	

=== Asia-Pacific Film Festival ===
Year	Award	Category	Nominated work	Result	Ref.
2006	51st	Best Actress	Perhaps Love	Nominated	
2009	53rd	Best Actress	The Equation of Love and Death	Nominated	

=== Asia Pacific Screen Awards ===
Year	Award	Category	Nominated work	Result	Ref.
2009	3rd	Best Actress	The Equation of Love and Death	Nominated	
2017	11th	Best Actress	Our Time Will Come	Nominated	

=== Beijing College Student Film Festival ===
Year	Award	Category	Nominated work	Result	Ref.
2003	10th	Favorite Actress	Where Have All the Flowers Gone	Won	
2006	13th	Best Actress	Perhaps Love	Nominated	
2006	13th	Favorite Actress	Perhaps Love	Won	
2009	16th	Best Actress	The Equation of Love and Death	Won	
2012	19th	Best Actress	The Flying Swords of Dragon Gate	Nominated	
2018	25th	Best Actress	Our Time Will Come	Won	

=== Busan International Film Festival ===
Year	Award	Category	Nominated work	Result	Ref.
2006	11th	Most Promising Female Artist in Asia	—N/a	Won	
2026	31st	Busan Award for Best Actor	The First Taste of Loneliness	Won	

=== Changchun Film Festival ===
Year	Award	Category	Nominated work	Result	Ref.
2009	8th	Best Actress	Perhaps Love	Nominated	
2024	19th	Best Actress	Across the Furious Sea	Nominated	

=== China Film Director's Guild Awards ===
Year	Award	Category	Nominated work	Result	Ref.
2005	1st	Best Actress	Baobei in Love	Won	
2013	4th	Best Actress	Painted Skin: The Resurrection	Nominated	
2018	9th	Best Actress	Our Time Will Come	Nominated	
2019	10th	Best Actress	Last Letter	Nominated	。
2022	13th	Best Actress	The Eleventh Chapter	Won	
2024	15th	Best Actress	Across the Furious Sea	Won	

=== Chinese Film Media Awards ===
Year	Award	Category	Nominated work	Result	Ref.
2005	5th	Best Actress	Baobei in Love	Nominated	
2006	6th	Best Actress	Perhaps Love	Nominated	
2009	9th	Best Actress	The Equation of Love and Death	Won	
2010	10th	Best Actress	The Message	Nominated	

=== Golden Bauhinia Awards ===
Year	Award	Category	Nominated work	Result	Ref.
2006	11th	Best Actress	Perhaps Love	Won	
2007	12th	Best Supporting Actress	The Banquet	Won	

=== Golden Horse Film Festival and Awards ===
Year	Award	Category	Nominated work	Result	Ref.
2002	39th	Best Leading Actress	Hollywood Hong Kong	Nominated	
2006	43rd	Best Leading Actress	Perhaps Love	Won	
2009	46th	Best Leading Actress	The Message	Nominated	
2018	55th	Best Leading Actress	Last Letter	Nominated	

==== As a singer ====
Year	Award	Category	Nominated work	Result	Ref.
2002	39th	Best Original Film Song	Hollywood Hong Kong share with:Fruit Chan (lyricist); Lam Wah-Chuen (composer) song:The Flames of Lychee	Nominated	
2006	43rd	Best Original Film Song	Perhaps Love (share with:Leon Ko (composer); Chris Shum(Lyricist); Takeshi Kaneshiro (singer) song:Crossroad	Won	
2006	43rd	Best Original Film Song	The Banquet (share with:Dun Tan (composer); Anonymous (Lyricist) song:Song by the Yue girl	Nominated	

=== Golden Rooster Awards ===
Year	Award	Category	Nominated work	Result	Ref.
2007	26th	Best Supporting Actress	The Banquet	Nominated	
2009	27th	Best Actress	The Equation of Love and Death	Won	

=== Golden Phoenix Awards ===
Year	Award	Category	Nominated work	Result	Ref.
2009	12th	Society Acting Award	The Equation of Love and Death	Won	
2011	13th	Special Jury Award	The Message	Won	

=== Huading Awards ===
Year	Award	Category	Nominated work	Result	Ref.
2010	15th	Best Actress (Film)	The Equation of Love and Death	Won	
2012	17th	Best Actress (Film)	Painted Skin: The Resurrection	Nominated	
2015	20th	Best Actress (Film)	Overheard 3	Nominated	
2018	23rd	Best Actress (Film)	Our Time Will Come	Nominated	
2021	30th	Best Actress (Film)	The Eleventh Chapter	Nominated	

=== Festival du Film de Paris ===
Year	Award	Category	Nominated work	Result	Ref.
2000	15th	Best Actress	Suzhou River	Won	

=== HKSAR 10th Anniversary Film Awards ===
Year	Award	Category	Nominated work	Result	Ref.
2007	1st	Best Actress	Perhaps Love	Nominated	

=== Hong Kong Film Awards ===
Year	Award	Category	Nominated work	Result	Ref.
2006	25th	Best Actress	Perhaps Love	Won	
2007	26th	Best Supporting Actress	The Banquet	Won	
2009	28th	Best Actress	Painted Skin	Nominated	
2012	31st	Best Actress	The Flying Swords of Dragon Gate	Nominated	
2013	32nd	Best Actress	The Great Magician	Nominated	
2013	32nd	Best Actress	The Silent War	Nominated	
2015	34th	Best Actress	Women Who Flirt	Nominated	
2018	37th	Best Actress	Our Time Will Come	Nominated	

==== As a singer ====
Year	Award	Category	Nominated work	Result	Ref.
2008	27th	Best Original Film Song	Ming Ming share with:Anthony Wong Yiu-ming (composer/performer); Jason Choi (composer); Lin Xi (lyricist) song:Happy Wanderer	Nominated	

=== Hong Kong Film Critics Society Award ===
Year	Award	Category	Nominated work	Result	Ref.
2006	12th	Best Actress	Perhaps Love	Won	
2007	13th	Best Actress	The Banquet	Nominated	
2009	15th	Best Actress	Painted Skin	Nominated	
2012	18th	Best Actress	The Flying Swords of Dragon Gate	Nominated	
2015	21st	Best Actress	Overheard 3	Nominated	

=== Hundred Flowers Awards ===
Year	Award	Category	Nominated work	Result	Ref.
2002	25th	Best Actress	A Pinwheel Without Wind	Won	
2010	30th	Best Actress	Painted Skin	Nominated	
2010	30th	Best Actress	The Message	Shortlisted	
2010	30th	Best Actress	Confucius	Shortlisted	
2012	31st	Best Actress	The Flying Swords of Dragon Gate	Nominated	

=== NETPAC Awards ===
Year	Award	Category	Nominated work	Result	Ref.
2002	4th	Best Actress	Hollywood Hong Kong	Nominated	
2006	8th	Best Actress	Perhaps Love	Won	
2010	12th	Best Actress	The Message	Nominated	

=== Macau International Movie Festival ===
Year	Award	Category	Nominated work	Result	Ref.
2021	13th	Best Actress	The Yinyang Master	Nominated	
2023	15th	Best Actress	Hidden Blade	Nominated	

=== SCO Film Festival ===
Year	Award	Category	Nominated work	Result	Ref.
2018	1st	Best Actress	Our Time Will Come	Won	

=== Shanghai Film Critics Awards ===
Year	Award	Category	Nominated work	Result	Ref.
2009	18th	Best Actress	The Equation of Love and Death	Won	

=== Shanghai International Film Festival ===
Year	Award	Category	Nominated work	Result	Ref.
2017	20th	Best Actress	Our Time Will Come	Nominated	

== Television ==
=== Asian Academy Creative Awards ===
Year	Award	Category	Nominated work	Result	Ref.
2019	2nd	Best Actress in a Leading Role (China)	Ruyi's Royal Love in the Palace	Won	

=== Asia Contents Awards & Global OTT Awards ===
Year	Award	Category	Nominated work	Result	Ref.
2024	6th	Best Lead Actor (Female)	Imperfect Victim	Nominated	

=== Asia Rainbow TV Awards ===
Year	Award	Category	Nominated work	Result	Ref.
2016	3rd	Best Actress	Red Sorghum	Nominated	

=== Asian Television Awards ===
Year	Award	Category	Nominated work	Result	Ref.
2002	7th	Best Actress	Ripening Orange	Nominated	
2015	20th	Best Actress	Red Sorghum	Won	
2024	29th	Best Actress	Imperfect Victim	Nominated	

=== Beijing Daily Awards ===
Year	Award	Category	Nominated work	Result	Ref.
2019	1st	Best Actress	Ruyi's Royal Love in the Palace	Won	

=== China TV Drama Awards ===
Year	Award	Category	Nominated work	Result	Ref.
2014	6th	Best Actress	Red Sorghum	Won	

=== China TV Golden Eagle Awards ===
Year	Award	Category	Nominated work	Result	Ref.
2000	18th	Audience's Choice for Most Popular Actress	Palace of Desire	Won	
2000	18th	Audience’s Favorite Supporting Actress	Palace of Desire	Won	
2003	21st	20th Anniversary Outstanding Achievement Award for Actress	—N/a	Won	
2020	30th	Best Actress	Ruyi's Royal Love in the Palace	Longlisted	
2020	30th	Audience's Choice for Actress	Ruyi's Royal Love in the Palace	Longlisted	
2022	31st	Best Actress	Medal of the Republic	Nominated	
2024	32nd	Best Actress	Imperfect Victim	Nominated	

=== China Television Director Committee Awards (Television Directors Conference) ===
Year	Category	Nominated work	Result	Ref.
2016	Best Actress	Red Sorghum	Won	
2024	Actress of the Year	Imperfect Victim	Won	

=== Flying Apsaras Awards ===
Year	Award	Category	Nominated work	Result	Ref.
2015	30th	Outstanding Actress	Red Sorghum	Nominated	
2022	33rd	Outstanding Actress	Medal of the Republic	Nominated	

=== Hengdian Film and TV Festival of China ===
Year	Award	Category	Nominated work	Result	Ref.
2015	2nd	Best Actress	Red Sorghum	Won	

=== Huading Awards ===
Year	Award	Category	Nominated work	Result	Ref.
2015	17th	Best Actress	Red Sorghum	Won	
2015	17th	National Audiences' Favorite Film and TV Star	Red Sorghum	Won	

=== Macau International Television Festival ===
Year	Award	Category	Nominated work	Result	Ref.
2023	14th	Best Actress	Imperfect Victim	Nominated	

=== Shanghai Television Festival ===
Year	Award	Category	Nominated work	Result	Ref.
2015	21st	Best Actress	Red Sorghum	Won	
2020	26th	Shanghai Internet Summit for Best Actress (Webdrama)	Imperfect Love	Won	
2024	29th	Best Actress	Imperfect Victim	Won	

=== The Actors of China Awards ===
Year	Award	Category	Nominated work	Result	Ref.
2015	2nd	Actress of the Year Award in the Blue Group (Sapphire)	Red Sorghum	Won	

=== Tencent Entertainment White Paper Annual Ceremony ===
Year	Award	Category	Nominated work	Result	Ref.
2021	7th	Most Popular Actress in a TV Series	A Little Mood for Love	Won	

=== Television Series of China Quality Ceremony ===
Year	Award	Category	Nominated work	Result	Ref.
2024	7th	Outstanding Quality Actress of the Year	Imperfect Victim	Won	

== Music ==
=== Asia-Pacific Music Chart Annual Awards ===
Year	Award	Category	Nominated work	Result	Ref.
2005		Mainland China's Most Popular Female Singer of the Year	Ou Yu (偶遇)	Won	

=== CASH Golden Sail Music Awards ===
Year	Award	Category	Nominated work	Result	Ref.
2005/2006	6th	Best Alternative Work	"Crossroads (十字街头)" share with Leon Ko (Composer/Arranger), Chris Shum (Lyricist), Peter Kam (Producer), Takeshi Kaneshiro (singer)	Won	

=== CCTV-MTV Music Awards ===
Year	Award	Category	Nominated work	Result	Ref.
2002	4th	Mainland China's Most Promising Singer of the Year	—N/a	Won	
2003	5th	Mainland China's Most Popular Songs of the Year	"Xing Fu Hua Yuan (幸福花园)"	Won	
2005	7th	Mainland China's Most Popular Female Singer of the Year	Ou Yu (偶遇)	Won	

=== China Music Awards ===
Year	Award	Category	Nominated work	Result	Ref.
2003	10th	Best Newcomer Award (Mainland China)	—N/a	Won	

=== China Original Pop Music Chart Awards ===
Year	Award	Category	Nominated work	Result	Ref.
2001	1st	Best Female Newcomer Award	—N/a	Won	
2005	4th	Mainland China's Most Popular Female Singer	—N/a	Won	
2005	4th	Top Mainland Chinese Hits	"Shen Wei Dong, Xin Yi Yuan (身未动，心已远)"	Won	
2006	5th	Mainland China's Most Popular Female Singer	—N/a	Won	
2006	5th	Top Mainland Chinese Hits	"Da Qi (大齊)"	Won	
2007	6th	Asia-Pacific Region's Most Outstanding All-Rounder Artist Award	—N/a	Won	

=== Chinese Music Radio Awards ===
Year	Award	Category	Nominated work	Result	Ref.
2003	10th	Special Award	—N/a	Won	
2004	11th	Top 15 Golden Melody Awards	"Kan Hai (看海)"	Won	

=== Chinese Top Ten Music Awards ===
Year	Award	Category	Nominated work	Result	Ref.
2006	13th	Top 10 Songs of the Year	"Da Qi (大齐)"	Won	
2006	13th	All-Around Artist Award (Judges' Choice)	—N/a	Won	

=== Guangdong Radio and TV's Golden Melody Chart Awards ===
Year	Award	Category	Nominated work	Result	Ref.
2005		Best Mainland China's Female Singer	—N/a	Won	

=== Global Chinese Music Awards ===
Year	Award	Category	Nominated work	Result	Ref.
2003	3rd	Most Popular Female Newcomer Award	—N/a	Silver Prize	

== Other accolades ==
=== State honors ===
Country	Year	Honor	Ref.
France	2014	Knight of the National Ordre des Arts et des Lettres	
