= 3rd Asian Film Awards =

2009 edition of award ceremony

- Awarded for: Excellence in Asian cinema
- Awarded by: Hong Kong International Film Festival
- Presented on: March 23, 2009
- Site: Hong Kong Convention and Exhibition Centre
- Official website: Asian Film Awards

Highlights
- Best Picture: Tokyo Sonata
- Best Direction: Koreeda Hirokazu; Still Walking
- Best Actor: Masahiro Motoki; Departures
- Best Actress: Zhou Xun; The Equation of Love and Death

The 3rd Asian Film Awards was given in a ceremony on 23 March 2009 as part of the Hong Kong International Film Festival.

== Nominees and winners ==
=== Best Film ===
- Winner: Tokyo Sonata (Japan)
  - Forever Enthralled (China)
  - The Good, the Bad, the Weird (South Korea)
  - Ponyo on the Cliff by the Sea (Japan)
  - The Rainbow Troops (Indonesia)
  - Red Cliff (China)

=== Best Director ===
- Winner: Koreeda Hirokazu, Still Walking (Japan)
  - Feng Xiaogang, If You Are the One (China)
  - Kim Jee-woon, The Good, the Bad, the Weird (South Korea)
  - Brillante Mendoza, Service (Philippines)
  - Miyazaki Hayao, Ponyo on the Cliff by the Sea (Japan)
  - John Woo, Red Cliff (China)

=== Best Actor ===
- Winner: Masahiro Motoki, Departures (Japan)
  - Ge You, If You Are the One (China)
  - Ha Jung-woo, The Chaser (South Korea)
  - Akshay Kumar, Singh Is Kinng (India)
  - Kenichi Matsuyama, Detroit Metal City (Japan)
  - Song Kang-ho, The Good, the Bad, the Weird (South Korea)

=== Best Actress ===
- Winner: Zhou Xun, The Equation of Love and Death (China)
  - Fukatsu Eri, The Magic Hour (Japan)
  - Jiang Wenli, And the Spring Comes (China)
  - Deepika Padukone, Chandni Chowk To China (India)
  - Yoshinaga Sayuri, Kabei - Our Mother (Japan)
  - Zhao Wei, Painted Skin (China/Hong Kong)

=== Best Newcomer ===
- Winner: Yu Shaoqun, Forever Enthralled (China)
  - Matsuda Shota, Boys Over Flowers: the Movie (Japan)
  - Sandrine Pinna, Miao Miao (Taiwan/Hong Kong)
  - So Ji-sub, Rough Cut (South Korea)
  - Xu Jiao, CJ7 (Hong Kong)
  - Yanin Vismistananda, Chocolate (Thailand)

=== Best Supporting Actor ===
- Winner: Jung Woo-sung, The Good, the Bad, the Weird (South Korea)
  - Nick Cheung, Beast Stalker (Hong Kong)
  - Lee Byung-hun, The Good, the Bad, the Weird (South Korea)
  - Tsutsumi Shinichi, Suspect X (Japan)
  - Wang Xueqi, Forever Enthralled (China)

=== Best Supporting Actress ===
- Winner: Gina Pareño, Service (Philippines)
  - Yū Aoi, Sex Is No Laughing Matter (Japan)
  - Jaclyn Jose, Service (Philippines)
  - Kiki Kirin, Still Walking (Japan)
  - Kim Ji-young, Forever the Moment (South Korea)

=== Best Screenwriter ===
- Winner: Kurosawa Kiyoshi, Max Mannix and Sachiko Tanaka, Tokyo Sonata (Japan/Hong Kong/the Netherlands)
  - Na Hong-jin, The Chaser (South Korea)
  - Li Qiang, And the Spring Comes (China)
  - Tom Lin Shu-yu and Henry Tsai, Winds of September (Taiwan/ Hong Kong)
  - Mitani Koki, The Magic Hour (Japan)

=== Best Cinematographer ===
- Winner: Jola Dylewska, Tulpan (Germany/Kazakhstan/Poland/Russia/Switzerland)
  - Ato Shoichi, Paco and the Magical Book (Japan)
  - Cheng Siu-Keung, Sparrow (Hong Kong)
  - Lee Mo-gae, The Good, the Bad, the Weird (South Korea)
  - Wang Yu and Nelson Lik-wai Yu, 24 City (China)

=== Best Production Designer ===
- Winner: Daniel Yan-kong Lee, Three Kingdoms: Resurrection of the Dragon (China/Hong Kong/South Korea)
  - Nitin Chandrakant Desai, Jodhaa Akbar (India)
  - Kuwajima Towako, Paco and the Magical Book (Japan)
  - Bill Lui, Painted Skin (China/Hong Kong)
  - Taneda Yohei, The Magic Hour (Japan)

=== Best Composer ===
- Winner: Joe Hisaishi, Ponyo on the Cliff by the Sea (Japan)
  - Dalpalan and Jang Young-gyu, The Good, the Bad, the Weird (South Korea)
  - Hanno Yoshihiro and Lim Giong, 24 City (China)
  - Henry Wan-man Lai, Three Kingdoms: Resurrection of the Dragon (China/Hong Kong/South Korea)
  - A.R. Rahman, Jodhaa Akbar (India)

=== Best Editor ===
- Winner: Kim Sun-min, The Chaser (South Korea)
  - Chan Ki-hop, Beast Stalker (Hong Kong)
  - William Suk-ping Chang, Miao Miao (Taiwan/Hong Kong)
  - Darya Danilova, Native Dancer (Kazakhstan/Russia/France/Cinema of Germany)
  - Waluyo Ichwandiardono, The Rainbow Troops (Indonesia)

=== Best Visual Effects ===
- Winner: Craig Hayes, Red Cliff (China)
  - Kim Wook, The Good, the Bad, the Weird (South Korea)
  - Yanagawase Masahide, Paco and the Magical Book (Japan)

=== Special awards ===
- The Edward Yang New Talent Award:Wei Te-sheng (Taiwan) for Cape No. 7
- The Nielsen Box Office Award presented by The Hollywood Reporter: Priyanka Chopra (India)
