= Golden Sun Films =

Golden Sun Films Distribution Ltd. (Chinese: 香港泰吉影業發行有限公司; Jyutping: hoeng1gong2 taai3gat1 jing2jip6 faat3hong4 jau5haan6 gung1si1) is a Taiwan-born, Hong Kong-based film production and distribution company established in 1972. The company has a vault of over 400-500 feature films and has an extensive network of clients around the world.

== History ==
Golden Sun was founded in 1972 by Sichuan-born Tan Lianhong with his wife Wu Yuyun (died 1979) as a producer in the company. Over time, the company expanded its business area and moved to Hong Kong. In 1990, following the opening of the market in mainland China, the company started producing movies regularly there, establishing co-operation with mainland filmmakers.

The success of Ang Lee's Crouching Tiger, Hidden Dragon led to a surge in imitations across the greater China region, in order to replicate its success. Golden Sun released Flying Dragon, Leaping Tiger in 2001, set in ancient China. It collaborated with the Munhwa Broadcasting Corporation for the 2008 drama series East of Eden. On June 5, 2009, the company set up a subsidiary in Beijing.

The company attended a symposium on the usage of generative artificial intelligence technologies and copyright infringement in October 2024.

== Partial filmography ==
- Bruce Lee's Secret (1977)
- Flying Dragon, Leaping Tiger (2001)
- Shaolin Family Soccer (2004)
- Painted Skin (2008, co-production with Shanghai Film Group, Singapore's Raintree Pictures and other companies)
- A Chinese Ghost Story (2011)
