= The Road Not Taken (2026 film) =

- International promotional poster
- Traditional Chinese: 明天，會更好
- Simplified Chinese: 明天，会更好
- Hanyu Pinyin: Míngtiān, huì gèng hǎo
- Directed by: Peter Chan
- Written by: Peter Chan; Wu Huiling
- Produced by: Peter Chan; Yee Chung-man
- Starring: Zhou Xun; Lawrence Wang; Tian Zhuangzhuang; Diana Lin; Vicky Chen; Zhang Youhao
- Cinematography: Zeng Jian
- Edited by: Zhou Xiaolin
- Music by: Maurizio Malagnini
- Production companies: We Pictures Limited; ChengDu J.Q. Pictures Company Limited; Emei Film Group; Huaxia Film Distribution
- Distributed by: Moebius Entertainment Limited; We Distribution Limited
- Release date: September 18, 2026 (TIFF)
- Running time: 135 minutes
- Countries: China; Hong Kong
- Language: Mandarin

The Road Not Taken (Chinese: 明天，会更好) is 2026 drama film co-written, directed, co-produced by Peter Chan, starring Zhou Xun, Lawrence Wang, Tian Zhuangzhuang, Diana Lin, Vicky Chen and Zhang Youhao. A Chinese-Hong Kong co-production, it explores the effects of early-onset Alzheimer's disease on a famous female television host and her family.

The film had its world premiere in the Special Presentations section at the 2026 Toronto International Film Festival on September 18, 2026.

== Synopsis ==
The film tells the story of a successful television host Jia Jia (Zhou Xun) whose professional life appears stable, even as her marriage to a wildlife conservationist is deteriorating.

At a public discussion about "artificial intelligence", Jia Jia is unable to recall the correct term and instead calls it "artificial talent". She dismisses the incident as a result of work-related exhaustion. However, as similar memory lapses begin to occur with increasing frequency, it becomes apparent that something more serious is affecting her.

The film interweaves Jia Jia's worsening symptoms with conflicts within her family, particularly her fractured relationship with her daughter and her complicated relationship with her father. As the disease progresses, the deterioration of her memory and perception increasingly disrupts her understanding of the world around her. Familiar relationships, social roles, past conflicts, and the identity she has constructed throughout her life gradually lose their stability, leaving her increasingly dependent on immediate emotions and struggling to distinguish what she can trust.

== Cast ==
- Zhou Xun as Jia Jia (Shen Jia)
- Lawrence Wang as Jia Jia's husband
- Tian Zhuangzhuang as Jia Jia's father
- Diana Lin
- Vicky Chen as Jia Jia's daughter
- Zhang Youhao

== Production ==
The film began principal photography on May 8, 2026 at the Xicun Courtyard in Chengdu.

== Release ==
Director Peter Chan alongside actress Zhou Xun and actor Wang Xiao on the red carpet at a film premiere during the 2026 Toronto International Film Festival on October 18, 2026

The Road Not Taken had its world premiere in the Special Presentations section of the 51st Toronto International Film Festival on September 18, 2026.

At the 2026 China (Hengdian) International Film Market, held alongside the 30th National Film Promotion Conference, director Peter Chan and Huaxia Film Distribution presented the film on October 26. It was also selected as the opening film of the "Golden Rooster Mainland Film Screening" Exhibition section at the 2026 China Golden Rooster and Hundred Flowers Film Festival on November 6, held as part of the 39th Golden Rooster Awards. The film had its U.S. premiere as the closing film of the 12th Asian World Film Festival on November 18, 2026, as part of the festival's "Focus on China" section.
