= Huayi Brothers =

Chinese film production company, record label and talent agency

Huayi Brothers Media Corporation
- Native name: 华谊兄弟传媒股份有限公司
- Romanized name: Huáyì Xiōngdì Chuánméi Gǔfèn Yǒuxiàn Gōngsī
- Type: Public
- Traded as: SZSE: 300027
- Industry: Entertainment
- Founded: 1994; 32 years ago
- Founder: Dennis Wang; James Wang
- Headquarters: Beijing, China; Shanghai, China; Shenzhen, China; Hong Kong; Macau; Taipei, Taiwan; Malaysia; Singapore
- Number of locations: 1
- Area served: China
- Key people: Wang Zhongjun (Chairman & CEO); Wang Zhonglei (President)
- Products: Movies, television shows, music, movie theaters
- Services: Talent representation for musicians and actors/actresses
- Revenue: ▲CNY 892,000,000 (2011)
- Owner: Wang Zhongjun; Wang Zhonglei
- Subsidiaries: Huayi Brothers Film Investment Co., Ltd. Huayi Brothers TV Service Co., Ltd. Huayi Brothers Contemporary Culture Broker Co., Ltd. Huayi Brothers Music Co., Ltd. Huayi Brothers Animation; Huayi Brothers Advertising Co., Ltd. Huayi Brothers International Distribution Ltd. HB Wink Animation
- Website: www.huayimedia.com

Huayi Brothers
- Founded: 1994
- Founder: Wang Zhongjun, Wang Zhonglei
- Genre: Mandopop
- Country of origin: China
- Official website: ent.sina.com.cn/huayi

HB International Sp. z o.o.
- Founded: 2020
- Founder: Michał Czwarek
- Genre: Animated film
- Official website: ent.sina.com.cn/huayi

Huayi Brothers Media Corp. (Chinese: 华谊兄弟传媒股份有限公司; pinyin: Huáyì Xiōngdì Chuánméi Gǔfèn Yǒuxiàn Gōngsī) is a Chinese entertainment conglomerate founded in 1994 by brothers Dennis Wang Zhongjun and James Wang Zhonglei. It rose to prominence through its successful collaborations with director Feng Xiaogang on his Chinese New Year films. Huayi Brothers played a key role in the commercialization of China’s film industry during the 1990s and emerged as an industry leader in the 2000s. The company was listed on the ChiNext board of the Shenzhen Stock Exchange in 2009. Since the 2010s, it has experienced a gradual decline.

== History ==
Huayi Brothers operates through a number of wholly owned and affiliated subsidiaries, including Huayi Brothers Talent Agency Co., Ltd., Huayi Brothers Film Investment Co., Ltd., Huayi Brothers Television Program Co., Ltd., Huayi Brothers Music Co., Ltd., Huayi Brothers Advertising Co., Ltd., Huayi Brothers International Distribution Co., Ltd., Huayi Vision Media Advertising Co., Ltd., Huayi Brothers Cinema Investment Co., Ltd., and Huayi Brothers Fashion & Culture Media Co., Ltd., among others. In mainland China, its principal competitors are Bona Film Group, China Film Group Corporation, Hairun Pictures, and Orange Sky Golden Harvest.

In 1994, Wang Zhongjun used the US$100,000 he had saved during five years in the United States, where he worked primarily as a delivery driver, to take over Huayi Advertising Company in Beijing and renamed it Huayi Brothers Advertising Company. His younger brother Wang Zhongfang left his job as a taxi driver to join the company and received a 5 percent stake, while his youngest brother, Wang Zhonglei, invested RMB 100,000. Wang Zhonglei began working at Huayi after his trading company failed in 1995. Wang Zhongfang died in a car accident the following year.

Huayi Brothers achieved early commercial success by designing and producing corporate identities for major companies, including the Bank of China, Huaxia Bank, and the State Grid Corporation of China. In 1998, it entered the film industry by investing in Chen Kaige’s The Emperor and the Assassin and Jiang Wen’s Devils on the Doorstep. Both films received critical acclaim but were commercial failures.

Huayi Brothers first collaborated with Feng Xiaogang by investing in his film, Sorry Baby, in 1999. The film grossed RMB 30 million and became the second-highest-grossing domestic film of the year. In 2000, Huayi partnered with Taihe Real Estate to establish Huayi Brothers Taihe Film and Television and with talent agent Wang Jinghua to form Huayi Brothers Taihe Times Management. Feng also joined Huayi as a contracted director. Their initial collaboration produced films including Cell Phone, A Sigh, and Big Shot’s Funeral, helping to establish the market for Chinese New Year films.

Feng left Huayi in 2004. That year, the company began supporting director Lu Chuan and produced Kekexili: Mountain Patrol. In 2005, following a dispute over the casting of non-contracted actors in The Banquet, Wang Jinghua led a large group of artists out of Huayi to join Orange Sky Entertainment. Lu also left after terminating his contract over creative differences. At the end of the year, Huayi acquired Feng Xiaogang’s film studio and Zhang Jizhong’s production company through share-swap agreements.

In 2007, Focus Media and other investors invested US$20 million in Huayi Brothers.

In 2008, Huayi Brothers acquired the talent agency Zhongqian Longde and the film and television production company Jinze Taihe.

In May 2011, Tencent invested RMB 450 million in Huayi Brothers, acquiring approximately 4.6 percent of the company's shares. The following month, Huayi Brothers announced that its wholly owned subsidiary Huayi International had formed a joint venture with Legendary Entertainment and other partners to establish Legendary East, a company focused on the production of English-language films. In March 2012, Huayi Brothers partnered with Now TV, Edko Films, and Peter Chan's We Pictures to launch Channel 133 in Hong Kong.

In July 2013, Huayi Brothers acquired a 50.88 percent stake in Yinhan Technology, a Chinese mobile game developer and operator, through a combination of equity and cash, valuing the company at RMB 671.61 million. From 6 to 8 June 2014, Huayi Brothers held a large-scale anniversary event in Haikou to commemorate the company's twentieth anniversary.

In 2015, Huayi Brothers announced plans to spin off its new media business and establish it as a separate internet entertainment company for independent listing. That same year, the company made several high-profile acquisitions of celebrity-affiliated companies. In November 2015, Huayi Brothers acquired a 70 percent stake in Dongyang Meila, a company founded by director Feng Xiaogang, for RMB 1.05 billion, despite the company having been established only two months earlier with minimal assets. In October 2015, Huayi Brothers also announced the acquisition of a 70 percent stake in Zhejiang Dongyang Haohan Film & Television Entertainment Co., Ltd., a company established one day earlier, valuing it at over RMB 1 billion.

Huayi Brothers Movie World, a theme park inspired by the company's film productions, opened in Suzhou on 22 July 2018. The same year, following the fallout from Fan Bingbing's tax evasion case, which triggered industry-wide tax audits, capital withdrawals, and regulatory tightening, Huayi Brothers was among the companies most affected. It reported a net loss of approximately RMB 1.2 billion in 2018, marking its first annual loss since its 2009 listing. The company has continued to record losses in subsequent years, accompanied by significant year-on-year revenue declines.

In June 2022, the Zhejiang branch of the China Securities Regulatory Commission issued warning letters to Wang Zhongjun and Wang Zhonglei after determining that they had failed to suspend trading and timely disclose changes in their shareholdings as required, only filing the relevant equity change reports in December 2021.

In 2025, MBK Partners, South Korea’s largest private equity firm, acquired Huayi Brothers Movie World in Suzhou and renamed it Haihean Suzhou Yangcheng Peninsula Park.

On 23 April 2026, a bankruptcy application was filed against Huayi Brothers and taken up by the Jinhua Intermediate People’s Court in Zhejiang. On 16 September, the company announced a proposed restructuring plan under which CMC Inc. would serve as the restructuring investor and invest approximately RMB 836 million.

== Artists ==
The following is only a partial list, and many of those listed have already left.
- Duan Yihong
- Fei
- Feng Shaofeng
- Pace Wu
- Li Bing Bing
- Lu Ning
- He Zhuoyan
- Zhou Xun
- Yao Chen
- Wang Luoyong
- Vision Wei Chen
- Wang Zhuocheng

== Productions ==
=== TV series ===
Year	English Title	Alternative Title	Episodes
2006	Soldiers Sortie	士兵突击	28
2009	My Chief and My Regiment	我的团长我的团	43
2009	Dwelling Narrowness	蜗居	35
2010	Legends of the message	风声传奇	30
2011	Pursuit	追逃	30
2011	Armor Hero	铠甲勇士	52
2011	Armor Hero XT	铠甲勇士XT	60
2012	Husband and Wife	夫妻那些事	34
2012	Vary Peri	幻变精灵之蛋糕甜心	40
2013	The Heart Without Thieves	无贼	48
2015	Jing-ju Cats	京剧猫	200
2018	Long time no see	好久不见	42

=== Films ===
Year	English Title	Alternative Title	Notes
2003	Cell Phone	手机	
2004	A World Without Thieves	天下无贼	
2004	Kung Fu Hustle	功夫	
2006	The Banquet		
2006	Rob-B-Hood	宝贝计划	
2007	The Matrimony	心中有鬼	
2007	Assembly	集结号	
2008	The Forbidden Kingdom	功夫之王	
2008	If You Are the One	非诚勿扰	
2009	The Message	风声	
2009	Look for a Star	游龙戏凤	
2009	The Equation of Love and Death	李米的猜想	
2009	The Spring in The Winter		
2010	Aftershock	唐山大地震	
2010	Detective Dee and the Mystery of the Phantom Flame	狄仁杰之通天帝国	
2012	LOVE	爱	
2012	CZ12	十二生肖	
2012	Taichi 0	太極：從零開始	
2012	Painted Skin: The Resurrection	画皮II	
2013	Journey to the West: Conquering the Demons	西遊·降魔篇	
2013	Mr. Go	大明猩	
2013	Personal Tailor	私人订制	
2013	Young Detective Dee: Rise of the Sea Dragon	狄仁傑之神都龍王	
2014	Women Who Flirt	撒娇女人最好命	
2015	Lost and Love	失孤	
2015	Only You	命中注定	
2015	Mojin: The Lost Legend	鬼吹灯之寻龙诀	
2015	Dragon Blade	天将雄师	
2015	Mr. Six	老炮儿	
2016	The Boy	灵偶契约	
2016	Warcraft	魔兽世界	
2016	Free State of Jones	烈火邊境	
2016	The Wasted Times	罗曼蒂克消亡史	
2016	Hardcore Henry	硬核大战	
2016	The Edge of Seventeen	成长边缘	
2016	Rock Dog	摇滚藏獒	
2016	Bad Moms	坏妈妈	
2017	The Space Between Us	回到火星	
2017	Revenge for Love	瘋岳撬佳人	Distribution
2017	The Foreigner	英伦对决	
2017	A Bad Moms Christmas	阿姐響叮噹	
2017	Molly's Game	茉莉牌局	
2018	Mile 22	22 英里	
2018	Peppermint	薄荷	
2018	The Happytime Murders	快乐时光谋杀案	
2018	Detective Dee: The Four Heavenly Kings	狄仁傑之四大天王	
2018	Ash Is Purest White	江湖儿女	
2018	Mojin: The Worm Valley	云南虫谷	
2019	Radioactive	放射性	Uncredited
2019	21 Bridges	21座桥梁	
2020	The Eight Hundred	八佰	
2021	Rock Dog: Rock Around the World		Direct-to-Video
2021	Extinct		
2022	The 355		
2022	Moonfall	月落	
2022	Paws of Fury: The Legend of Hank	炽热的武士	Distributed by Paramount Pictures in the United States and select countries (under Nickelodeon Movies)
2022	Rock Dog: Battle The Beat		Direct-to-Video
	Thunder Agents		
	untitled Horror film		(co-production with Dark Castle Entertainment)

== See also ==
- C-pop
