= Remain Silent =

2019 Chinese film

- Theatrical release poster
- Simplified Chinese: 保持沉默
- Hanyu Pinyin: Bǎochí chénmò
- Directed by: Zhou Ke
- Written by: Zhou Ke
- Produced by: Jingle Ma
- Starring: Zhou Xun; Francis Ng; Zu Feng
- Cinematography: Jake Pollock
- Production companies: Beijing Enlight Media; Shenzhen Zhonghui TV And Film Culture Communication Co., Ltd. Shannan Light Film Co., Ltd. Xunguang Year Cultural Development (Beijing) Co., Ltd. China Central Newsreel and Documentary
- Distributed by: Beijing Enlight Media
- Release date: August 23, 2019 (China)
- Running time: 96 minutes
- Country: China
- Languages: Mandarin; Cantonese
- Box office: $3 million

Remain Silent (Chinese: 保持沉默) is a 2019 Chinese crime drama film directed and written by Zhou Ke, and starring Zhou Xun, Francis Ng and Zu Feng. It was released on August 23, 2019.

== Synopsis ==
Wan Wenfang (Zhou Xun) was assassinated in Hong Kong during her performance. The suspect is a young man. Lawyer Duan Mulan took over the case and was ready to start the investigation, but in the process of investigation, she found that the prosecutor of the case is her former lover Wu Zhengwei (Francis). At the same time, she found the case to be suspicious, so she went to the young man's home to seek the truth, and fell into a series of trouble.

== Cast ==
- Zhou Xun as Duan Mulan/Wan Wenfang
- Francis Ng as Wu Zhengwei
- Zu Feng as Tian Jingcheng
- Rooy Sun as Jimmy Thomas
- Kou Chia-jui as Li Guo
- Wang Tianchen as Gang Qin
- Li Na as Luo Meihui
- Li Yuan as Bo Qu
- Swan Wen as Anne
