= Our Time Will Come (film) =

2017 Chinese-Hong Kong film by Ann Hui

- Theatrical release poster

Chinese name
- Traditional Chinese: 明月幾時有
- Simplified Chinese: 明月几时有
Transcriptions
Standard Mandarin
- Hanyu Pinyin: Míng Yuè Jǐ Shí Yǒu
Yue: Cantonese
- Jyutping: Ming4 Jyut6 Gei2 Si4 Jau5
- Directed by: Ann Hui
- Screenplay by: He Jiping
- Produced by: Roger Lee; Stephen Lam; Ann Hui
- Starring: Zhou Xun; Eddie Peng; Wallace Huo
- Cinematography: Nelson Yu Lik-wai
- Edited by: Mary Stephen
- Music by: Joe Hisaishi
- Production companies: Shanghai Bona Cultural Media; Bona Entertainment Company; Class Limited; Distribution Workshop; Entertainment Team Media Group; Quidam Studios
- Distributed by: Bona Film Group Limited; China Lion Film Distribution; Golden Village Pictures mm2 Entertainment
- Release dates: June 21, 2017 (Shanghai Film Festival); July 1, 2017 (China); July 6, 2017 (Hong Kong)
- Running time: 130 minutes
- Countries: China; Hong Kong
- Languages: Cantonese; Mandarin; Japanese
- Box office: 63 million yuan (China)

Our Time Will Come (Chinese: 明月幾時有) is a 2017 war film directed by Ann Hui, starring Zhou Xun, Eddie Peng and Wallace Huo. It revolves around the resistance movement during the Japanese occupation of Hong Kong. The film opened in China on July 1, 2017 to commemorate and to coincide with the 20th anniversary of the handover of Hong Kong from the United Kingdom to China. It was released in Hong Kong on July 6, and in the United States and Canada on July 7.

== Synopsis ==
Set in the 1940s, the film tells the story of a legendary woman "Fang Gu" (Zhou Xun), who is one of the key figures during the Japanese occupation of Hong Kong. It also portrays the fight and struggle for freedom and independence by youths of the resistance groups. The story is narrated by an old taxi driver, being interviewed for a documentary, who speaks of the people he knew as a boy growing up under the Japanese occupation.

Fang Lan is an ordinary bookish young woman with a poetical streak who lives with her mother in 1942 Hong Kong. She is engaged to marry Lee Gam-wing (Wallace Huo), but breaks the engagement, citing his lack of concern about the fact that much of the population of Hong Kong is starving to death. Fang's mother rents rooms in her house to various intellectuals such as the writer Mao Dun. Learning that the Japanese are planning to execute much of the Hong Kong intelligentsia, the resistance is planning to smuggle the targeted intellectuals out to "Free China". Fang assists the resistance leader Blackie Lau (Eddie Peng) in helping Mao and his wife escape Hong Kong and in disposing of the corpse of the collaboratist spy Lau executed. Lee goes to the work for the poetry-loving Colonel Yamaguchi of the Kempeitai, the much feared Japanese military police. Despite his friendship with Yamaguchi who loves Tang poetry (a subject that Lee is an expert in) Lee sometimes assists the resistance.

Over the vehement opposition of her mother, Fang joins the resistance and becomes by 1944 the leader of its East Hong Kong section. Mrs. Fang wants her daughter to settle down as a wife and mother, roles that she rejects. Over time, Fang's mother comes to accept her as she is. Lau emerges as the most daring resistance leader in Hong Kong who constantly eludes the Kempeitai and its Chinese collaborators. A sort of love triangle emerges as Fang still has feelings for Lee while feeling attracted to Lau.

To assist Fang, her mother smuggles an important message, but is arrested by the Kempeitai. Fang and Lau lead an attack on the Kempeitai station to free her mother, which fails and Mrs. Fang is executed. Yamaguchi discovers that Lee was working for the resistance and tipped off Fang as to where her mother was being held. Yamaguchi has Lee killed. As Hong Kong has become too dangerous, Lau and Fang flee via junk at night; their ultimate fates are not revealed. A shot of Hong Kong at night in 1944 transforms into a shot of modern Hong Kong today. The elderly taxi driver who has been narrating the story of Fang breaks off his interview and goes back to his work as a humble taxi driver.

== Cast ==
- Zhou Xun as Fang Lan/"Fang Gu"
- Eddie Peng as Liu Heizai/"Blackie" Lau
- Wallace Huo as Li Jinrong/"Wing"
- Paw Hee-ching as Mrs. Fang
- Jessie Li
- Tony Leung as Ben
- Guo Tao as Mao Dun
- Huang Zhizhong
- Jiang Wenli
- Alex Fong
- Ivana Wong
- Ray Lui
- Deanie Ip
- Sam Lee
- Eddie Cheung
- Stanley Fung
- Kingdom Yuen
- Suzuka Morita

== Release ==
Our Time Will Come premiered on June 21, 2017 at the 2017 Shanghai International Film Festival. The film was originally announced during the 2017 Cannes Film Festival in May as the Shanghai festival's opening film, but its opening spot was replaced on June 9 by The Chinese Widow, directed by Bille August. Although no reason has been given by the festival, Clarence Tsui writing for the South China Morning Post assumed that this less to do with the content of Ann Hui's film and more to do with August's film, also set during World War II, being "an even better fit for China’s national narrative right now", having an acclaimed Danish director directing a romantic story between a local woman in the Zhejiang province and a US fighter pilot and being the first film completed after the signing of China and Denmark's co-production treaty on May 3.

Our Time Will Come was released in China on July 1, 2017 to coincide with the 20th anniversary of the handover of Hong Kong from the United Kingdom to China. The film was released on July 6, 2017 in Hong Kong.

The film was released in the United States and Canada by China Lion on July 7, 2017.

== Reception ==
=== Critical response ===
Our Time Will Come has received positive reviews from critics. On Rotten Tomatoes, the film has a rating of 94%, based on reviews from 17 critics, with an average rating of 7.4/10. On Metacritic, the film has a score of 82 out of 100, based on 8 critics, indicating "Generally favorable reviews". The film was especially well reviewed in China, receiving a 83.6 points out of 100 in a report jointly released by China Film Archive and the entertainment researcher Entgroup. There was strong praise for Zhou Xun's performance.

=== Box office ===
The film has grossed 63 million yuan in China, surpassing the gross of Hui's 2014 film The Golden Era.

== Awards and nominations ==
Award	Category	Recipients	Result
25th Beijing College Student Film Festival	Best Actress	Zhou Xun	Won
25th Beijing College Student Film Festival	Jury Award	Our Time Will Come	Nominated
23rd Huading Awards	Best Actor	Eddie Peng	Nominated
23rd Huading Awards	Best Actress	Zhou Xun	Nominated
9th China Film Director's Guild Awards	Best Film	Our Days Will Come	Nominated
9th China Film Director's Guild Awards	Best Actress	Zhou Xun	Nominated
37th Hong Kong Film Awards	Best Film	Roger Lee, Stephen Lam, Ann Hui	Won
37th Hong Kong Film Awards	Best Director	Ann Hui	Won
37th Hong Kong Film Awards	Best Screenplay	Ho Kei-ping	Nominated
37th Hong Kong Film Awards	Best Actress	Zhou Xun	Nominated
37th Hong Kong Film Awards	Best Supporting Actress	Deanie Ip	Won
37th Hong Kong Film Awards	Best Cinematography	Nelson Yu	Nominated
37th Hong Kong Film Awards	Best Film Editing	Mary Stephen, Kong Chi-leung	Nominated
37th Hong Kong Film Awards	Best Art Direction	Man Lim-chung, Billy Li	Won
37th Hong Kong Film Awards	Best Costume & Make Up Design	Man Lim-chung, Billy Li	Nominated
37th Hong Kong Film Awards	Best Original Film Score	Joe Hisaishi	Won
37th Hong Kong Film Awards	Best Sound Design	Tu Du-chih, Wu Shu-yao	Nominated
12th Asian Film Awards	Best Director	Ann Hui	Nominated
12th Asian Film Awards	Best Supporting Actor	Eddie Peng	Nominated
12th Asian Film Awards	Best Editing	Mary Stephen, Kwong Chi-leung	Nominated
12th Asian Film Awards	Best Original Music	Joe Hisaishi	Won
Shanghai International Film Festival	Best Actor	Eddie Peng	Nominated
Shanghai International Film Festival	Best Actor	Wallace Huo	Nominated
Shanghai International Film Festival	Best Actress	Zhou Xun	Nominated
54th Golden Horse Awards	Best Director	Ann Hui	Nominated
54th Golden Horse Awards	Best Supporting Actor	Tony Leung Ka-fai	Nominated
54th Golden Horse Awards	Best Supporting Actress	Deanie Ip	Nominated
54th Golden Horse Awards	Best Original Film Score	Joe Hisaishi	Nominated
54th Golden Horse Awards	Best Film Editing	Mary Stephen and Kong Chi-leung	Nominated
2nd Golden Screen Awards	Best Supporting Actress	Deanie Ip	Won
