= Zhou Xun =

Chinese actress and singer (born 1974)

- 周迅
- Zhou in 2026
- Born: Zhou Mika (周米卡); 18 October 1974 (age 52); Quzhou, Zhejiang, China
- Education: Zhejiang Art School (Zhejiang Vocational Academy of Art)
- Occupations: Actress; singer
- Years active: 1991–present
- Agents: Beijing Rosat (1999–2005); Huayi Brothers (2005–2010); Zhou Xun Studio (2010–present); Dongshen Future K·ARTISTS (2018–present)
- Spouse: Archie Kao (m. 2014; div. 2020)

Zhou Xun
- Chinese: 周迅
Transcriptions
Standard Mandarin
- Hanyu Pinyin: Zhōu Xùn
Yue: Cantonese
- Jyutping: Zau1 Seon3

Zhou Mika (birth name)
- Chinese: 周米卡
Transcriptions
Standard Mandarin
- Hanyu Pinyin: Zhōu Mǐkǎ

Zhou Xun (Chinese: 周迅, born 18 October 1974) is a Chinese actress and singer. Regarded as one of the Four Dan actresses of China, Zhou became the first Chinese actor to achieve the "Grand Slam" in 2009, winning Best Actress at the three most prestigious Chinese-language film awards, the Golden Horse Awards, the Hong Kong Film Awards and the Golden Rooster Awards.

Zhou first rose to prominence with Lou Ye's Suzhou River (2000), followed by films such as Balzac and the Little Chinese Seamstress (2002), Perhaps Love (2005), The Equation of Love and Death (2008), Painted Skin (2008), The Message (2009), Flying Swords of Dragon Gate (2011), Our Time Will Come (2017), and Across the Furious Sea (2023).

On television, she is known for dramas such as Palace of Desire (2000), The Legend of the Condor Heroes (2003), Red Sorghum (2014), Ruyi's Royal Love in the Palace (2018), A Little Mood for Love (2021), and Imperfect Victim (2023).

== Early life ==
Zhou was born to a middle-class family in Quzhou, Zhejiang. Her father, Zhou Tianning (周天宁), was a local film projectionist, and her mother, Chen Yiqin (陈以琴), was a salesperson at a department store. She had her schooling in Quzhou No.1 Middle School. After she graduated, Zhou enrolled at the Zhejiang Art School to further her interest in dramatic arts, against the wishes of her parents, who wanted her to pursue a practical degree. She was handpicked for a role in the film Strange Tales Amongst Old and Desolate Tombs during her teenage years in school.

== Acting career ==
=== 1995–2004: Beginnings and breakthrough ===
Zhou debuted in the comedy movie The Pampered Wife (1995). She next starred in Chen Kaige's films, Temptress Moon (1996) and The Emperor and the Assassin (1999). But it was not until in 2000 that Zhou received recognition in China. With her role as young Princess Taiping in historical drama Palace of Desire, Zhou received the Audience's Choice for Most Popular Actress and Audience's Choice for Supporting Actress awards at the 18th China TV Golden Eagle Awards.

Zhou achieved breakthrough on the big screen with Lou Ye's Suzhou River (2000), which won her the Best Actress award at the 15th Festival du Film de Paris. That year, she was named one of the Four Dan Actresses alongside Zhang Ziyi, Zhao Wei and Xu Jinglei. She further achieved international recognition when she starred in the Franco-Chinese romance drama film Balzac and the Little Chinese Seamstress (2002). With her praised performance in Liu De-kai's film A Pinwheel Without Wind (2002), Zhou won Hundred Flowers Award for Best Actress, marking the first time she won a major domestic film award.

A string of successful projects followed. In her first Hong Kong film Hollywood Hong Kong directed by Fruit Chan, which was selected to compete for the Golden Lion at the 58th Venice International Film Festival, Zhou received her first Golden Horse Award for Best Leading Actress nomination and impressed critics with her performance. Hollywood magazine Variety praise Zhou saying "Zhou is superb, moving with ease between her various personalities and always convincing in each". Among Zhou's earlier notable works also include television series April Rhapsody (2000), Love Story in Shanghai (2001), Ripening Orange (2002) and The Legend of the Condor Heroes (2003).

=== 2005–2011: Critical acclaim ===
Zhou and Aaron Kwok backstage with their Best Leading Actress and Best Leading Actor awards, respectively, at the 43rd Golden Horse Awards on 25 November 2006, where Zhou was honored for her performance in Perhaps Love.

In 2005, Zhou starred the leading role in the musical film Perhaps Love directed by Peter Chan. For her nuanced performance in capturing the stark contrast between a rural girl and a woman living at the pinnacle of urban wealth in this film, she was awarded the Golden Horse Award for Best Leading Actress, in addition to Hong Kong Film Award, Golden Bauhinia Awards and Hong Kong Film Critics Society Award. She next starred in Feng Xiaogang's wuxia film The Banquet (2006), inspired from William Shakespeare's Hamlet. Zhou plays the girlfriend of the crown prince, equivalent to Ophelia. This role later earned her Hong Kong Film Award for Best Supporting Actress, which made her the first mainland Chinese actress to win both Best Actress (2006) & Best Supporting Actress (2007) at the Hong Kong Film Awards in two consecutive years. In 2007, she starred in Susie Au's film Ming Ming, which was highly praised at the 11th Pusan International Film Festival. Zhou played dual roles – twins with absolutely different characteristics and personalities.

She then starred in Cao Baoping's romantic thriller The Equation of Love and Death (2008) as a taxicab driver on the lookout for her missing boyfriend. Critics again praised Zhou, crediting the film's success to Zhou's performance as Li Mi. Zhou went on to receive Best Actress awards at the Asian Film Awards, Shanghai Film Critics Awards, Golden Rooster Film Festival, and Chinese Film Media Awards. The same year she appeared in Gordon Chan's horror-adventure film Painted Skin, a remake of a classic supernatural thriller of the same title. The film later earned her Best Actress nominations at the Hundred Flowers Awards, Hong Kong Film Critics Society Award and the Hong Kong Film Awards. Next came spy thriller The Message (2009), about Japanese invaders in China who try to ferret out a spy among their Chinese collaborators. The film later earned her third Golden Horse Award for Best Leading Actress nomination and Special Jury Award at the 2011 Golden Phoenix Awards.

In 2009, Zhou was named the Star of the Year at CineAsia exhibition and distribution convention in Hong Kong. Asia-Pacific Producers Network (APN) also honored her as the Asian Star of the Year for her exemplary box office achievements. In an interview with CNN, Zhou was named Asia's 25 greatest actors of all time.

In August 2010, Zhou ended her five-year contract with Huayi Brothers.

She filmed the wuxia film Flying Swords of Dragon Gate (2011) directed by Tsui Hark. The film earned her Best Actress nominations at the Hundred Flowers Awards, Hong Kong Film Critics Society Award and the Hong Kong Film Awards.

=== 2012–2017: Directorial and Hollywood debut, television comeback ===
In 2011, Zhou made her directorial debut with the short film Five Demon Traps, which stars Tony Leung Chiu-wai as a demon killer.

In 2012, she then had a reunion with Tony Leung Chiu-wai in two consecutive films, The Great Magician and The Silent War. For her admirable performances in these two films, Zhou received two Best Actress nominations at the 32nd Hong Kong Film Awards, becoming the first Mainland Chinese performer to be nominated for two Hong Kong Film Awards for Best Actress in the same year. Zhou made her Hollywood debut in the science fiction film Cloud Atlas (2012), playing multiple roles in the film. The same year she filmed Painted Skin: The Resurrection directed by Wuershan, which was a sequel to the original film in 2008. The film grossed over the 700 million yuan ($109.8 million) landmark, becoming the highest-grossing Chinese-language movie of all time then.

In 2014, Zhou returned to television after 10 years in Red Sorghum, based on Nobel prize laureate Mo Yan's 1986/1987 novel of the same name. Zhou's performance in the series was highly praised by the author himself for her immaculate grasp of the character's inner turmoil. Zhou won the Best Actress awards at the Asian Television Award and Shanghai Television Festival.

In 2016, Zhou was set to play the leading role of the Step Empress in historical fiction drama Ruyi's Royal Love in the Palace, which was are the sequel to the drama Empresses in the Palace. The series later went on national broadcast in 2018.

In 2017, she made her return to the big screen in Ann Hui's war film Our Time Will Come alongside Eddie Peng and Wallace Huo. The film opened and competed for the Golden Goblet Award at the 2017 Shanghai International Film Festival and later earned her seventh Best Actress nomination at the Hong Kong Film Awards.

=== 2018–present: Established artist management agency and critical resurgence ===
On 2 January 2018, Zhou announced the establishment of their joint cultural and talent agency named Dongshen Future K·ARTISTS. The agency was co-founded by Chen Kun. In November 2018, she starred in the romance film Last Letter directed by Shunji Iwai, and was nominated for the Best Actress award at the Golden Horse Awards. The same year, Zhou was set to star in the wuxia film The Weary Poet.

In 2019, Zhou starred in the crime thriller film Remain Silent and family drama film The Eleventh Chapter. She drew acclaim for both performances, the latter giving her Best Actress award at the 13th China Film Director's Guild Awards.

In 2020, she starred in webdrama Imperfect Love, which was a remake of the 2010 Japanese TV series Mother. For her praised performance in this series, she received the Best Actress in a Webdrama award at the 26th Shanghai Television Festival.

In 2021, Zhou starred in fantasy film The Yinyang Master. In the same year, she returned to the small screen with a reunion with director Zheng Xiaolong after 7 years since Red Sorghum in one of eight-part anthology biographical drama Medal of the Republic. In the series, she portrayed Chinese pharmaceutical chemist and malariologist Tu Youyou, a Nobel Prize winner, focusing on her efforts to develop artemisinin and dihydroartemisinin in the 1970s, used to treat malaria. Zhou was recommended for this role by Tu Youyou following Tu's daughter's compliments on Zhou's acting. For her portrayal, she later received two Best Actress nominations at the 31st Golden Eagle Awards and 33rd Flying Apsaras Awards. Later this year, she played the female lead in the family drama A Little Mood for Love, which was also the second collaboration between Zhou and director Wang Jun after the historical drama Ruyi's Royal Love in the Palace. According to the National Radio and Television Administration, the series was the highest rated prime-time drama in Chinese satellite television channel in 2021.

In 2022, Zhou and director Li Shaohong reunited for the drama film Hero, their first joint project in 13 years. In the same year she played the leading role in Zhang Dalei's short film All Tomorrow's Parties, which then competed for "Berlinale Short Films Competition" section at the 73rd Berlin International Film Festival.

In 2023, she made a special appearance as Ms. Chen, member of the Communist Party and wife of Tony Leung Chiu-wai's character, in Cheng Er's World War II espionage thriller film Hidden Blade. Additionally, she returned to television in legal drama series Imperfect Victim (2023), which she portrayed as a lawyer defending a victim of sexual assault. The series received positive feedback and topped the rating during its broadcast time on Dragon TV and other platforms. Later, Across the Furious Sea, in which she starred the main role, began filming in 2019 and was licensed for theatrical release in November 2023. This crime thriller drama film marked the reunion of Zhou and director Cao Baoping after more than a decade since the film The Equation of Love and Death (2008). The later film earned her Best Actress award at the 2024 China Film Director's Guild Awards. Meanwhile, the former series earned her Best Actress awards at 2024 Television Directors Conference and 29th Shanghai Television Festival.

In 2024, Zhou was announced as a member of the jury for Main Competition section of the 26th Shanghai International Film Festival.

In 2026, Zhou reunited with director Peter Chan 21 years after their collaboration on Perhaps Love, starring as a television host diagnosed with Alzheimer's disease in The Road Not Taken. The film premiered at the 2026 Toronto International Film Festival in September 2026. In the same year, Zhou also starred in director Gu You's independent film The First Taste of Loneliness, which premiered in the Main Competition section of the 31st Busan International Film Festival in October 2026, the first edition of the festival to receive FIAPF accreditation as an A-list film festival. Her performance received widespread critical acclaim and earned her the Busan Award for Best Actor.

== Social activities ==
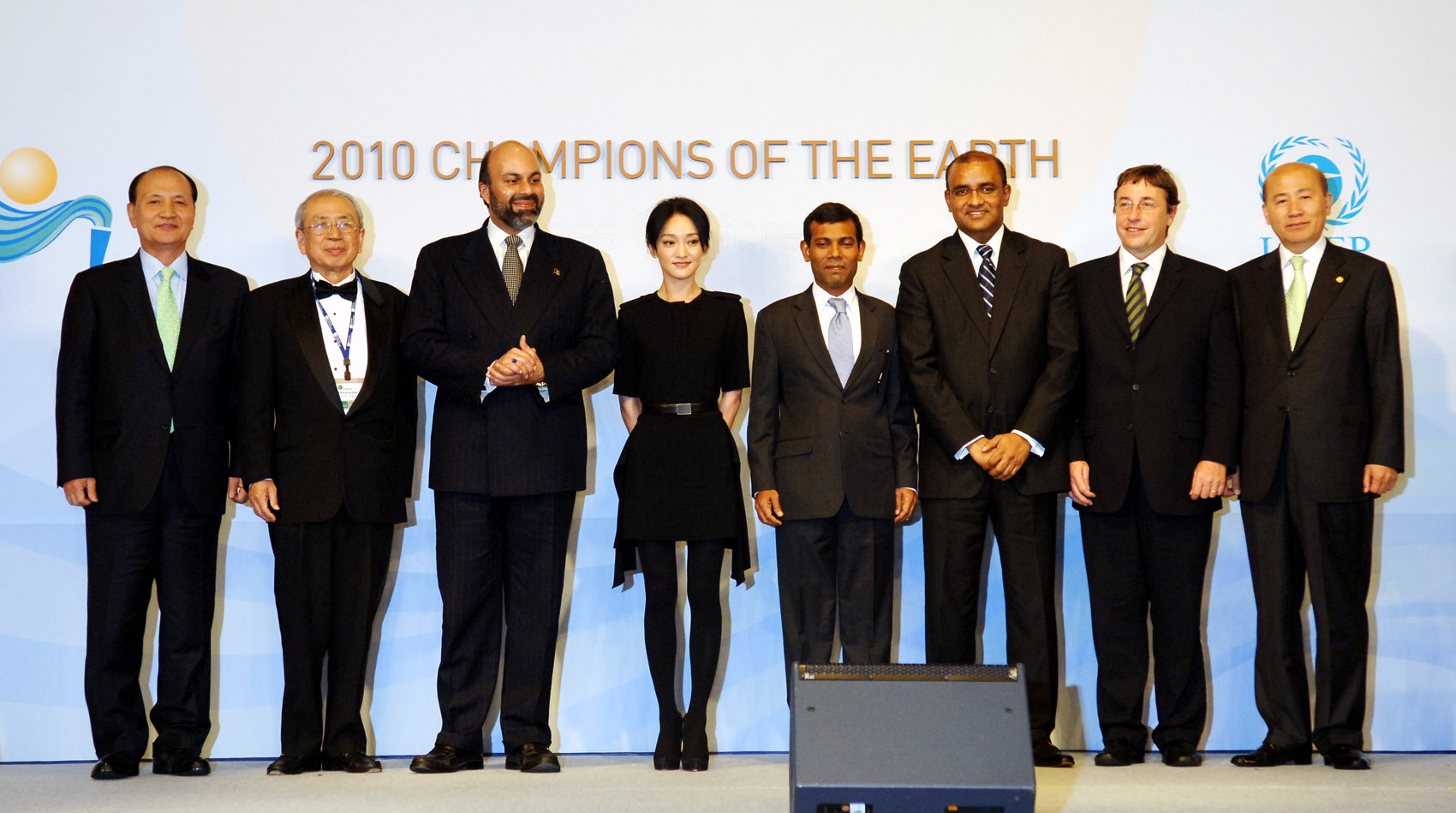
Zhou was named one of the 'Champions of the Earth' for her work with the United Nations Development Programme (UNDP), on the Earth Day, 2010, becoming the first entertainer in the world to receive this honour.

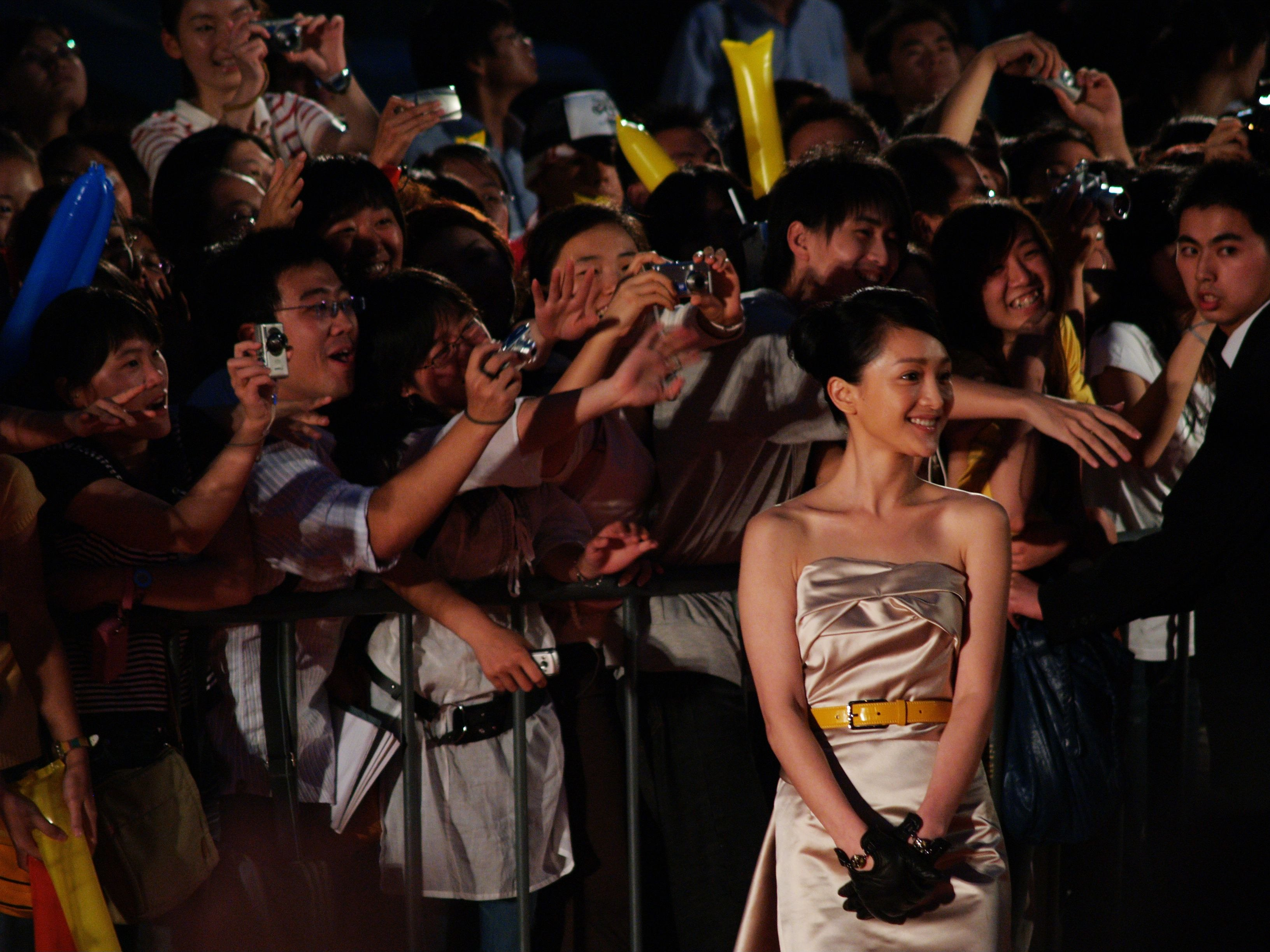
Zhou at the Shanghai International Film Festival in 2007

Zhou Xun was named the first United Nations Development Programme (UNDP) Goodwill Ambassador for China in 2008 with a special focus of promoting environmental sustainability. Zhou jointly runs a campaign 'Our Part', which promotes 'tips for green living'.

On 22 April 2010, she became the Laureate of United Nations Environment Programme (UNEP)'s Champions of the Earth (Inspiration & Action). She was the first entertainer in the world to receive this honour.

== Fashion and endorsements ==
In 2006, Zhou had become a global spokesperson for Miu Miu's Fall Winter 2006 Collection Campaign, alongside Dong Jie and Rina Ōta. In 2008, she was selected as brand ambassador for French luxury leather goods brand Lancel. In 2009, she became the Greater Chinese face for Lancel's Spring/Summer 2009 collection campaign. Since 2011, Zhou had been an ambassador for French luxury fashion house Chanel. Chanel chief designer Karl Lagerfeld noted Zhou Xun for her strong fashion sense, describing the actress as "a synthesis of young Coco Chanel and Ballet Troupe Zizi Jeanmaire." In 2020, Zhou became the Greater Chinese face of Chanel's "J12 Turns 20" advertising campaign, promoting the J12 Watch on its 20th anniversary, featuring alongside Lily-Rose Depp, Vanessa Paradis, Ali MacGraw, Naomi Campbell, Claudia Schiffer, Liu Wen and William Chan. In April 2023, Zhou became the global face for Chanel's J12 Watch Campaign – "It's All About Seconds", alongside Penélope Cruz, Margot Robbie and Ali MacGraw. In 2014, Zhou was selected as brand ambassador for Swiss luxury watch brand IWC Schaffhausen. In September 2014, Zhou became the global face for IWC Schaffhausen's 2014 Portofino Midsize Collection Campaign, alongside Cate Blanchett, Emily Blunt, Ewan McGregor and Christoph Waltz.

In 2007, Zhou was selected as brand spokesperson for American skincare brand Olay, alongside Maggie Cheung and Lin Chi-ling In 2011, Zhou was selected as brand ambassador for American worldwide clothing brand GAP, alongside Philippe Cousteau Jr. In 2013, Zhou was named as brand spokesperson for Marubi Tokyo, a high-end skincare subsidiary brand of L Catterton. Since 2020, Zhou was selected as brand ambassador for Decorté, a Japanese luxury skincare and cosmetics subsidiary brand of Kosé. On 19 October 2020, Chinese domestic beauty brand Perfect Diary announced that Zhou would be its first global spokesperson. In September 2021, SAIC-GM-Wuling announced Zhou as the Wuling Motors' global spokesperson. In April 2024, Zhou was selected as brand spokesperson for Swedish electric performance car brand Polestar alongside her labelmate Chen Kun.

Zhou has been on the cover of many top fashion magazines including Vogue China and Vogue Taiwan, Chinese and Hong Kong Harper's Bazaar, Chinese and Hong Kong Elle, Chinese and Taiwanese Marie Claire, Chinese and Hong Kong Cosmopolitan, Chinese L'Officiel, Chinese Madame Figaro, Chinese Numéro, Chinese T, Chinese V, Chinese GQ, Chinese Esquire, Chinese Elle Men, Chinese Harper's Bazaar Men.

== Personal life ==
=== Relationships ===
From 1993 to 1998, Zhou dated singer Dou Peng, cousin of Dou Wei, after meeting Dou Peng during a performance in Hangzhou. She followed him to Beijing, and their relationship lasted for five years. From 1998 to 1999, Zhou started a relationship with Jia Hongsheng while filming Suzhou River. Their relationship ended when Jia saw singer Pu Shu in a coat he had given to Zhou on television. In 2000, Zhou had a brief romance with actor Song Ning (now known as Song Ningfeng) during the filming of A Pinwheel Without Wind. From 2002 to 2003, Zhou dated Li Yapeng after co-starring with him in The Legend of the Condor Heroes. From 2003 to 2008, Zhou began a five-year relationship with Taiwanese stylist Li Daqi, who was introduced to her by singer Rene Liu. From 2009 to 2010, Zhou was romantically involved with Beijing businessman Wang Shuo. Zhou married American actor Archie Kao on 16 July 2014 on stage after a charity event in Hangzhou, Zhejiang. On 23 December 2020, Zhou announced on Weibo that they had divorced.

=== Others ===
Zhou received Hong Kong permanent residency under the "Quality Migrant Admission Scheme" in 2009.

== Filmography ==
=== Film ===
Year	English title	Chinese title	Role	Notes	Ref.
1991	Inside an Old Grave	古墓荒斋	Jiao Na		
1993	Story of Rouge Chamber	胭楼记	Zheng Yue'e		
1995	The Pampered Wife	小娇妻	Yangyang		
1995	Maiden Rosé	女儿红	Hua Dao		
1996	Temptress Moon	风月	Little dance girl	Cameo	
1998	My Rice Noodle Shop	花桥荣记	Xie Yan		
1999	The Emperor and the Assassin	荊軻刺秦王	Blind girl	Cameo	
2000	Suzhou River	苏州河	Mei Mei / Mou Dan		
2000	If I Lose You	如果没有爱	Xun		
2001	Beijing Bicycle	十七岁的单车	Hong Qin	Cameo	
2001	Hollywood Hong Kong	香港有个荷里活	Hung Hung / Tong Tong		
2002	A Pinwheel Without Wind	烟雨红颜	Zhao Ningjing		
2002	Where Have All the Flowers Gone	那时花开	Huan Zi		
2002	Balzac and the Little Chinese Seamstress	巴尔扎克和小裁缝	Little seamstress		
2004	Baober in Love	恋爱中的宝贝	Bao Bei		
2005	A West Lake Moment	鸳鸯蝴蝶	Xiao Yu		
2005	Beauty Remains	美人依旧	Xiao Fei		
2005	Stolen Life	生死劫	Yan Ni	Television film	
2005	Perhaps Love	如果·爱	Sun Na		
2006	The Banquet	夜宴	Qingnü		
2007	Ming Ming	明明	Mingming / Nana		
2008	The Equation of Love and Death	李米的猜想	Li Mi		
2008	Painted Skin	画皮	Xiao Wei		
2008	All About Women	女人不坏	Ou Fanfan		
2009	The Message	风声	Gu Xiaomeng		
2010	Confucius	孔子	Nanzi		
2010	True Legend	苏乞儿	Yuan Ying		
2011	The Founding of a Party	建党伟业	Wang Huiwu	Cameo	
2011	The Flying Swords of Dragon Gate	龙门飞甲	Jade		
2012	The Great Magician	大魔术师	Liu Yin		
2012	Painted Skin: The Resurrection	画皮II	Xiao Wei		
2012	The Silent War	听风者	Zhang Xuening		
2012	Cloud Atlas	云图	Talbot / Yoona-939 / Rose	Hollywood debut	
2014	Overheard 3	窃听风云3	Ruan Yuehua		
2014	Women Who Flirt	撒娇女人最好命	Zhang Hui		
2014	Meet Miss Anxiety	我的早更女友	Qi Jia		
2017	Our Time Will Come	明月几时有	Fang Gu		
2018	Last Letter	你好，之华	Yuan Zhihua		
2019	The Eleventh Chapter	第十一回	Jin Cailing		
2019	Remain Silent	保持沉默	Duan Mulan		
2021	The Yinyang Master	侍神令	Bai Ni		
2022	Hero	世间有她	Shen Yue		
2023	Hidden Blade	无名	Ms. Chen		
2023	Across the Furious Sea	涉过愤怒的海	Jing Lan		
2026	The Road Not Taken	明天，会更好	Shen Jia/Jia Jia		
2026	The First Taste of Loneliness	初次尝到寂寞	Jiang Yue		
TBA	The Weary Poet	诗眼倦天涯	Wen Sanchun		
TBA	Moonlight Blade	天涯明月刀			

=== Television series ===
Year	English title	Chinese title	Role	Ref.
1997	The War of Two	红处方	Shen Pei	
1998	The Police Scene	警坛风云	Lin Peipei	
1999	Maid in Green	绿衣红娘	Fan Xiaoxuan	
2000	The True Color of Money	金钱本色	Mandy	
2000	Just Happy	开心就好	Tan Gege	
2000	Palace of Desire	大明宫词	young Princess Taiping	
2000	April Rhapsody	人间四月天	Lin Huiyin	
2000	The Taiping Heavenly Kingdom	太平天国	Shi Yiyang	
2000	Heart Network	心网	Na Niu	
2000	Home	缘来一家人	Tao Tao	
2001	Love Story in Shanghai	像雾像雨又像风	Du Xinyu	
2002	Ripening Orange	橘子红了	Xiu He	
2003	The Legend of the Condor Heroes	射雕英雄传	Huang Rong	
2003	Beach	海滩	A'Tong	
2003	Comprador Family	买办之家	Su Boyuan/Xia He	
2005	Absolute Privacy (Stolen Life)	绝对隐私	Yan Ni	
2014	Red Sorghum	红高粱	Jiu'er/Cang Jiulian	
2018	Ruyi's Royal Love in the Palace	如懿传	Ula Nara Ruyi	
2020	Imperfect Love	不完美的她	Lin Xuzhi	
2021	Medal of the Republic	功勋之屠呦呦	Tu Youyou	
2021	A Little Mood for Love	小敏家	Liu Xiaomin	
2023	Imperfect Victim	不完美受害人	Lin Kan	

=== Short film ===
Year	English title	Chinese title	Role	Ref.
2010	Devil Nail Clippers	指甲刀人魔	Li Kaiyi	
2011	Jump	纵身一跃	Herself	
2012	2032: The Future We Want	2032 我们期望的未	Herself	
2012	I Know U	星知我心	D24	
2014	One Day:The Rising Sun	太阳会飞	Zhou	
2014	Green	绿	Herself	
2016	Roman Holiday	Vogue Film之《罗马假期》	Herself	
2019	Love Actually	ELLE大女主系列微电影	Herself	
2019	Once Upon A Night	Vogue Film之《再见宝贝》	Herself	
2020	Daughter	女儿	Taxi Driver	
2020	Le Vrai Où	花的游吟	Club Singer	
2022	All Tomorrow's Parties	我的朋友	Xiao Zhou	

=== Voice roles ===
Year	Title	Ref.
2015	The Little Prince	
2025	A Story About Fire	

=== As producer ===
Year	English title	Chinese title	Director	Ref.
2015	Les Aventures d'Anthony	陪安东尼度过漫长岁月	Janet Chun	
2023	May	梅的白天和黑夜	Luo Dong	

=== As director ===
Year	English title	Chinese title	Lead actor	Ref.
2012	Five Demon Traps	五行伏妖	Tony Leung Chiu-wai, Wu Gang	

== Discography ==
=== Albums ===
Year	English title	Chinese title	Ref.
2003	Summer	夏天	
2005	Ŏuyù	偶遇	

=== Singles ===
Year	English title	Chinese title	Album	Notes
1999	"Wander Aimlessly"	飘摇	Hainan Hainan	
2000	"Heart like a Tragic Melody"	心如悲歌	Heaven and Earth Musical OST	
2001	"No Choice"	无奈	Ripening Orange OST	
2001	"Spring Comes Back and Forth"	春去春又回	Ripening Orange OST	
2002	"A Head of Lychee, Three Grabs of Fire"	一棵荔枝三把火	Hollywood Hong Kong OST	
2013	"Sunrise and Sunset"	日出日末	Beach OST	
2013	"Looking at the Sea"	看海	Beach OST	
2004	"In My eye"		Baobei in Love OST	
2004	"Empty like the Sky"	虚拟天空	Baobei in Love OST	
2004	"Busy Line"	占线	Baobei in Love OST	
2004	"The Body Hasn't Move, The Heart Already Wandered"	身未动,心已远	—N/a	Theme song of Travel Channel
2005	"Journey"	行囊	—N/a	Theme song of Travel Channel
2005	"Outside"	外面	Perhaps Love OST	
2005	"Crossroads"	十字街头	Perhaps Love OST	
2005	"Forget Who I Am"	忘了我是谁	Perhaps Love OST	with Takeshi Kaneshiro
2005	"Bubble"	泡泡	—N/a	Promotional song for Olay
2006	"Song of the Yue"	越人歌	The Banquet OST	
2006	"Electric Shadows"	电影往事	Electric Shadows OST	
2006	"Look"	看看	Ming Ming OST	with Anthony Wong
2006	"Song of the Vagrant"	流浪者之歌	Ming Ming OST	with Anthony Wong
2007	"Companion"	伴侣	—N/a	Promotional song for Motorola Moto
2008	"Outside the Window"	窗外	The Equation of Love and Death OST	
2008	"Love Earnestly"	用力爱	All About Women OST	
2009	"Love and Hate Extensively"	爱恨恢恢	Zhu Xian 2 OST	
2011	"Only One in the World"	这世界唯一的你	—N/a	
2012	"Guess the Lover"	猜情人	The Great Magician OST	with Tony Leung Chiu-wai
2014	"For the Child"	给小孩	One Day OST	
2014	"A Switch to Happiness"	幸福的开关	—N/a	
2018	"Appearance"	样子	Last Letter OST	
2019	"What a Woderful World"	多美好的世界啊		featuring Laura Fygi
2019	"Spring Time"	春光	—N/a	
2019	"A Lifelong Wait"	一生守候	Remain Silent OST	
2020	"Gaze Beyond"	遥望	Run For Young OST	with Chen Kun
2020	"You're Good"	你真好	Days and Nights in Wuhan OST	

== Awards and nominations ==
=== Forbes China Celebrity 100 ===
Year	Rank	Ref.
2004	7th	
2005	7th	
2006	2nd	
2007	6th	
2008	8th	
2009	9th	
2013	91st	
2014	15th	
2015	17th	
2017	60th	
2019	53rd	
2020	65th	

=== Honors ===
Country	Year	Honor	Ref.
France	2014	Knight of the National Ordre des Arts et des Lettres	

Awards
Asian Film Awards
Preceded by Jeon Do-yeon for Secret Sunshine	Best Actress; 2009 for The Equation of Love and Death	Succeeded by Kim Hye-ja for Mother
Golden Bauhinia Awards
Preceded by Rene Liu for A World Without Thieves	Best Actress; 2006 for Perhaps Love	Succeeded by Gong Li for Curse of the Golden Flower; Charlene Choi for Simply Actors
Preceded by Teresa Mo for 2 Young	Best Supporting Actress; 2007 for The Banquet	Succeeded by None
Golden Horse Awards
Preceded by Shu Qi for Three Times	Best Actress; 2006 for Perhaps Love	Succeeded by Joan Chen for The Home Song Stories
Golden Rooster Awards
Preceded by Carina Lau for Curiosity Kills the Cat; Yan Bingyan for Teeth of Love	Best Actress; 2009 for The Equation of Love and Death	Succeeded by Naren Hua for Mother
Hong Kong Film Awards
Preceded by Zhang Ziyi for 2046	Best Actress; 2006 for Perhaps Love	Succeeded by Gong Li for Curse of the Golden Flower
Preceded by Teresa Mo for 2 Young	Best Supporting Actress; 2007 for The Banquet	Succeeded by Siu Yam-yam for The Pye-Dog
Hong Kong Film Critics Society Awards
Preceded by Zhang Ziyi for 2046	Best Actress; 2005 for Perhaps Love	Succeeded by Gong Li for Curse of the Golden Flower
Hundred Flowers Awards
Preceded by Gong Li for Breaking the Silence	Best Actress; 2002 for A Pinwheel Without Wind	Succeeded by Xu Jinglei for Spring Subway
