= The Equation of Love and Death =

- Promotional poster
- Directed by: Cao Baoping
- Written by: Cao Baoping
- Produced by: Wang Zhonglei; Tsui Siu-Ming; Wang Zhongjun
- Starring: Zhou Xun; Deng Chao; Zhang Hanyu; Wang Baoqiang
- Cinematography: Yang Shu
- Edited by: Mou Xiaojie
- Music by: Dou Wei
- Distributed by: Huayi Brothers
- Release date: September 18, 2008 (China)
- Running time: 96 minutes
- Country: China
- Language: Mandarin
- Budget: $1,500,000
- Box office: $1,910,611

The Equation of Love and Death (Chinese: 李米的猜想; pinyin: lǐ mǐ de cāi xiǎng; lit. 'Li Mi's Supposition') is a 2008 Chinese drama film written and directed by Cao Baoping and starring Zhou Xun. It tells the story of Li Mi (played by Zhou Xun), a Kunming cab driver who longs for the day she can be reunited with her missing boyfriend. After a case of mistaken identity, a kidnapping, and a threat of extortion, Li Mi's dream may be on the cusp of becoming a reality.

The Equation of Love and Death is a Chinese (Huayi Brothers) and Hong Kong (Sundream Motion Pictures) co-production. It is Cao's second solo feature after 2006's Trouble Makers. The film premiered in China on September 18, 2008, in Shanghai and had its North American premiere at the 2008 Vancouver International Film Festival where it was part of the Dragons and Tigers side competition.

== Plot ==
Li Mi, a chain smoking taxi driver in the Chinese city of Kunming has been searching fruitlessly for her missing boyfriend for years. One day she picks up two strangers who turn out to be desperate criminals (Wang Baoqiang and Wang Yanhui) engaged in drug smuggling and importation of narcotics ingested in their stomachs. After the man intended to intercept and transport the drugs to the final location mysteriously commits suicide and falls off a bridge, the two men then kidnap Li and force her to drive to the designated location. However, midway on a refuel stop at a petrol station, she signals to the attendant to call for help. After Li escapes, Yanhui dies due to the leakage of the package inside his stomach resulting in organ failure. Then, at the police station, Li sees a man who she is sure to be her missing boyfriend, but who claims to not know her and goes by a different name, along with a new woman, supposedly his new girlfriend. After she wildly chases after him, he finally confesses that he does know her, but doesn't want anything to do with her anymore. Later, we find that he is also caught up in some sort of drug ring, and commits suicide by throwing himself over the bridge as well, symbolically landing on Li's car. The film ends with her finding out the fate of her boyfriend who left her a safe deposit box of money and a letter telling her to start a grocery store.

== Cast ==
- Zhou Xun as Li Mi, the film's heroine, Li Mi is a chain-smoking cabbie. Her boyfriend disappeared years ago, but she still reads and memorizes the letters that he occasionally sends her.
- Deng Chao as Fang Wen / Ma Bing, Li Mi's long lost boyfriend and a man who may be Fang Wen in disguise respectively.
- Zhang Hanyu as Ye Qingcheng, a police detective who becomes involved in Li Mi's story.
- Wang Baoqiang as Qiu Shuitian, one of Li Mi's passengers, a bumbling drug smuggler.
- Wang Ning as Feifei, Yanhui's wife.
- Wang Yanhui as Qiu Huogui, another of Li Mi's passengers, another smuggler.

== Reception ==
Early reviews by western critics suggested that Cao Baoping's sophomore film was a stylish thriller/drama, but that much depended on the power of Zhou Xun's performance as Li Mi. Shelly Kraicer, the Chinese film scholar and curator of the Vancouver International Film Festival's Dragons and Tigers competition noted that while director "Cao Baoping is an expert at orchestrating frenzy," the film ultimately belonged to Zhou Xun. Despite the praise, the film would not go on to win the award (which went to Emily Tang's Perfect Life). Variety critic Derek Elley also wrote in his review that the film was "motored by another saturated [performance] by the throaty-voiced Zhou."

Other critics saw the film as yet another example of China's growing sophistication with "genre films." The China Film Journal in its final verdict argued that while the film was not "life-changing," it was nevertheless a "step in the right direction" and that audiences would not mind "seeing a few more Memento-esque films" coming out of China in the near future.

The film won the Altadis New Directors Award at the 2008 San Sebastian International Film Festival.

== Accolades ==
Year	Award	Category	Recipient(s) and nominee(s)	Result	Notes
2008	56th San Sebastián International Film Festival	Altadis New Directors Award	Cao Baoping	Won	
2009	18th Shanghai Film Critics Awards	Best Actress	Zhou Xun	Won	
2009	18th Shanghai Film Critics Awards	Films of Merit	Top Ten Films	Won	
2009	3rd Asian Film Awards	Best Actress	Zhou Xun	Won	
2009	46th Golden Horse Film Awards	Best Supporting Actor	Zhang Hanyu	Nominated	
2009	46th Golden Horse Film Awards	Best Original Film Score	Dou Wei	Nominated	
2009	9th Chinese Film Media Awards	Best Actress	Zhou Xun	Won	
2009	16th Beijing College Student Film Festival	Best Actress	Zhou Xun	Won	
2009	27th Golden Rooster Awards	Best Director	Cao Baoping	Nominated	
2009	27th Golden Rooster Awards	Best Actress	Zhou Xun	Won	
2009	27th Golden Rooster Awards	Best Sound	Gu Changning	Nominated	
2009	27th Golden Rooster Awards	Best Score	Dou Wei	Nominated	
2009	12th Golden Phoenix Award	Society Award	Zhou Xun	Won	
2009	3rd Asia Pacific Screen Awards	Best Performance by an Actress	Zhou Xun	Nominated	
