= Wang Zhongjun =

Chinese businessman and entrepreneur (born 1960)

- Born: November 30, 1960 (age 65); Beijing, China
- Education: Stonybrook University
- Occupations: film producer, businessman, art collector
- Known for: co-founder of Huayi Brothers Media
- Relatives: Wang Zhonglei (brother)

Wang Zhongjun, also known as Dennis Wang (Chinese: 王中军; born November 30, 1960), is a Chinese billionaire businessman, film producer and art collector. He and his brother Wang Zhonglei (a.k.a. James Wang) founded the Chinese entertainment company Huayi Brothers.

== Career ==
He was born in Beijing, into a family in the military.

Wang bought Vincent van Gogh's 1890 painting Still Life, Vase with Daisies and Poppies for $61.8 million in November 2014. In May 2015, Wang bought Pablo Picasso's Femme Au Chignon Dans Un Fauteuil for $29.93 million. In May 2016, Wang bought a letter written by the 11th century Chinese scholar Zeng Gong for ¥ 207 million, setting a new record for a piece of Chinese letter.

Wang was ranked by Forbes as the 309th richest person in China in 2015, with a net worth of $1 billion.
