= A Pinwheel Without Wind =

2002 Chinese film directed by Liu Te-kai

A Pinwheel Without Wind 烟雨红颜
- A Pinwheel Without Wind poster
- Simplified Chinese: 烟雨红颜
- Directed by: Liu De-kai
- Written by: Wu Bing; Jiang Ping; Yang Haiwei
- Based on: Stop the Boat and Ask (停車暫借問) by Sharon Chung
- Produced by: Yang Yu-Bing; Tou Tak-Kei; Chen Sheng-He
- Starring: Zhou Xun; Jeff Chang
- Cinematography: Zhen Chunxiao; Zhong Chunhe; Chen Yaoming; Li Yixu
- Edited by: Zhai Ru
- Music by: San Bao
- Production companies: Shanghai Yongle Film & Television Technology Limited Company
- Distributed by: Guangdong Film Company Domestic Film Promotion Center; Beijing Bona Cultural Exchange Co., Ltd.
- Release date: 26 February 2002 (China)
- Running time: 110 minutes
- Country: China
- Language: Mandarin

A Pinwheel Without Wind (Chinese: 烟雨红颜; pinyin: Yan yu hong yan) is a 2002 Chinese romantic drama film directed by Taiwanese director Liu De-kai in his feature film directorial debut and starring Zhou Xun and Jeff Chang. The film is based on novella Stop the Boat and Ask (停車暫借問) by Taiwanese writer Sharon Chung. It was released theatrically in China on February 26, 2002.

== Plot ==
China 1945, a romance develops between the young Zhao Ningjing (Zhou Xun) and Lin Shuang-Ran (Jeff Chang), although they are distant cousins and Shuang-Ran is already betrothed. Each will seek to fight against there destiny to try to live each their romantic feelings.

== Cast ==
- Zhou Xun as Zhao Ningjing
- Jeff Chang as Lin Shuang-Ran
- Terry Chiu Hsin-Chih as Xiong Ying-Sheng
- Zeng Li as Su-yun
- Gong Xibing as Zhao's father
- Xi Meijuan as Zhao's mother
- Zhou Xiaoli
- Yang Guozhong as Lin's father
- Xu Yue'e as Lin's mother
- Tian Lei as Yuzhi
- Gong Xibin as Zhao's father
- Zhou Lei as Tian Shuang
- Sun Guitian as Jiang's mother
- Kang Xi as Xiong Shunsheng
- Zhou Guiqin as Su Yunmu
- Yan Chang as Xiong's father
- Yan Yongxuan as Xiong's mother
- Jiang Yuebing as Guo Heng
- Ye Xiaodong as Waiter
- Hu Bin as Xiong Guangsheng
- Yu Xijie as Little beggar
- Li Haowei as Little beggar
- Ran Zhongfen as Yongqing's wife
- Jie Peisheng as Bartender

== Crew ==
- Direction by Liu Te Kai
- Storyline by Sharon Chung
- Art direction by Song Jun, Li Bao-Lin
- Cinematography by Zhen Chun-Xiao, Lee Yee-Siu, Zhong Chun-He, Chan Yiu-Ming

== Awards ==
Year	Award	Category	Nominated work	Result	Ref.
2002	25th Hundred Flowers Awards	Best Actress	Zhou Xun	Won	
