= Painted Skin: The Resurrection =

2012 Chinese-Hong Kong film by Wuershan

- Promotional poster

Chinese name
- Traditional Chinese: 畫皮II
- Simplified Chinese: 画皮II
Transcriptions
Standard Mandarin
- Hanyu Pinyin: Huà Pí Èr
- Directed by: Wuershan
- Screenplay by: Ran Ping; Ran Jianan
- Produced by: Chen Kuo-fu; Pang Hong; Wang Zhonglei
- Starring: Zhou Xun; Chen Kun; Zhao Wei; Feng Shaofeng; Yang Mi; Fei Xiang; Chen Tingjia
- Cinematography: Arthur Wong
- Edited by: Xiao Yang
- Music by: Katsunori Ishida
- Production companies: Ningxia Film Studio; Dinglongda (Beijing) International Culture Media Co., Ltd. Huayi Brothers; Kylin Films
- Distributed by: Huayi Brothers
- Release date: 28 June 2012
- Running time: 120 minutes
- Countries: China; Hong Kong
- Language: Mandarin
- Budget: ¥150 million
- Box office: ¥726 million

Painted Skin: The Resurrection is a 2012 fantasy action film directed by Wuershan, starring Zhou Xun, Chen Kun, Zhao Wei, Feng Shaofeng and Yang Mi. A Chinese-Hong Kong co-production, the film reunites most of the original cast of the 2008 film Painted Skin, acting as a sequel to the original film in a new storyline and characters with some degrees of connection.

A television adaptation of the second film, Painted Skin: The Resurrection, similar to the first, was broadcast in 2013.

== Plot ==
In the 500 years that have passed since the events of the previous film, the fox demon Xiaowei has been imprisoned in ice for violating the demon code. Que'er, a quirky bird demon, rescues Xiaowei, and the two leave in search of a man who is willing to give his heart to Xiaowei so that she may become human. They first encounter a boorish prince who scoffs at the suggestion, so they take his heart. Xiaowei uses her magical powers to bait another potential donor, a general who dons a gold mask that covers half of his face. Curious about the general's identity, Xiaowei incapacitates him, but discovers later that her rescuer is not a man, but a woman with half of her face disfigured.

Xiaowei accompanies the mysterious woman to the White City at the border, where the woman is revealed to be Princess Jing, the youngest daughter of the ruling family who is inspecting the military outpost led by General Huo Xin. Huo once served as Jing's lead bodyguard and they developed a deep mutual affection. However, Huo remained faithful to his profession and spurned the princess' confessions to him. Princess Jing's face was disfigured by a monstrous bear while she was out in the forest. Huo showed up too late but still managed to kill the bear and save her.

That evening, while performing for Jing, Huo and his men, Xiaowei malevolently enchants the general. Unaware of Xiaowei's bewitchment and feeling betrayed by Huo, Jing throws herself into a lake, but Xiaowei rescues her. Revealing her magical powers to Jing, Xiaowei suggests that the princess's disfigurement will prevent Huo from ever loving her; to prove his devotion, the two women use a magic potion to switch appearances.

Meanwhile, Que'er, while walking through the White City at night, is accosted by two hooligans. Pang Lang, a town dweller who claims to have descended from a family of demon hunters, intervenes, but not before Que'er rips out the heart of one of her tormentors, revealing herself as a demon. Pang Lang tries to warn Huo about the demons but is prevented from entering Huo's residence by his guards.

That night, Jing, in disguise as Xiaowei, seduces the enchanted Huo. The next day, exploiting Jing's desire for Huo's seemingly unrequited love, Xiaowei suggests she and Jing exchange appearances permanently. Huo enters and, in a final attempt to reclaim his affection, Jing exposes Xiaowei as a demon and orders Huo to kill her. The enchantment prevents Huo from following the order, so Jing attacks him in frustration.

Suddenly, the army of the neighbouring Tianlang kingdom, led by an evil witch doctor, arrives at the White City to seize Princess Jing, who has been betrothed to the Tianlang prince. Jing refuses to accept the marriage, forcing Huo to protect the city. Jing ends the fighting by threatening to take her own life, and the Tianlang forces agree to retreat if Jing gives herself up in three days. Unwilling to marry a man other than Huo, Jing offers up her heart to Xiaowei so that the two may switch bodies and thus their destinies.

Xiaowei, in disguise as Jing, arrives at the Tianlang camp and discovers that her fiancé is the boorish prince whose heart she earlier consumed and that the Tianlang plan to reinvigorate him with her heart, which is actually Jing's. Without her demon magic, Xiaowei realises she can not stop this plan.

Que'er reveals to Pang Lang that Xiaowei and Jing have switched identities, and the demon hunter disseminates the information to Huo. Just as Jing is about to consume her first heart, completing her transition into a demon, Huo intervenes. He blinds himself with his sword, demonstrating his commitment to Jing and breaking the power of Xiaowei's enchantment. Que'er, Jing and Huo then rush to the Tianlang camp to reclaim Jing's heart. The four defeat the Tianlang forces, but Que'er is killed in the battle. Huo offers his own heart to Xiaowei in exchange for Jing's, but Xiaowei decides to return Jing's heart unconditionally. Under the bewitching moment of a parting eclipse, Xiaowei's soul merges with Jing's body and Jing's face is healed in the process. The film concludes with Huo and Jing preparing to live happily ever after, while Pang Lang finds a bird resembling Que'er in her true form and obtains a feather similar to the one he got from her when they first met.

== Cast ==
- Zhou Xun as Xiao Wei
- Chen Kun as Huo Xin
  - Qin Junjie as young Huo Xin
- Zhao Wei as Princess Jing
  - Guan Xiaotong as young Princess Jing
- Feng Shaofeng as Pang Lang
- Yang Mi as Que'er
- Kris Phillips as Witch doctor of Tianlang
- Gordon Liu as Uncle Da
- Chen Tingjia as Queen of Tianlang
- Morgan Benoit as Wolf Slave of Tianlang

== Reception ==
=== Box office ===
In mainland China, Painted Skin: The Resurrection scored the highest grossing opening for a local film and the third highest opening following the 3-D re-release of Titanic (1997) and Transformers: Dark of the Moon. With total box office gross of $115.07 million, the film became the highest grossing domestic film in China beating the previous record holder Let the Bullets Fly.

=== Critical reception ===
Aggregate site Rotten Tomatoes reported that 83% of critics have given the film a positive review based on 6 reviews, with an average rating of 4.40/10. After Painted Skin: The Resurrection premiered in China, critics praised the two leading actresses, especially Zhao Wei's performance. Audience members named Zhao "the most beautiful scarred woman ever seen".

Derek Elley from Film Business Asia wrote:

"The result is a very entertaining, slightly over-long costume fantasy whose performances and sheer technique carry a script that often punches above its weight."..." Zhou, who since Suzhou River (1999) has almost had the Mainland patent on sexually ambiguous, seductive roles, dominates the movie, as a demon who wants to be human even if it means pain. But she gets a run for her money from Zhao, who's developing much more screen gravitas in her mid-30s and is better directed here than in her previous female-warrior role in Jingle Ma's Mulan (2009). Zhao's scenes with Zhou are much more emotionally resonant than those with the weak-eyed Chen, her putative romantic partner."

Deborah Young from The Hollywood Reporter wrote:

"The result is a roller-coaster of a film that will divide audiences particularly along gender lines, having greater appeal for female viewers both because it is fundamentally a love story with a noble, long-haired, romantic hero, and thanks to the presence of four strong and powerful women characters who run the show. Performances run surprisingly deep, and the bond that links Jing and Xiaowei, in particular, rings very true in spite of the square-off between divas Zhou Xun and Zhao Wei."

== Awards and nominations ==
Awards & Nominations
Event	Category	Nominee	Result
49th Golden Horse Awards	Best Visual Effect	Xu An, Chang Hongsong	Nominated
9th Guangzhou Student Film Festival	Favorite Actress	Zhao Wei	Won
9th Guangzhou Student Film Festival	Favorite Role	Princess Jing (Zhao Wei)	Won
4th China Film Director's Guild Awards	Best Actress	Zhou Xun	Nominated
6th Vietnam DAN Movie Awards	Favorite Chinese Actress	Zhao Wei	Won
32nd Hong Kong Film Awards	Best Film from Mainland and Taiwan		Nominated
