= The Eleventh Chapter =

- Theatrical release poster
- Simplified Chinese: 第十一回
- Hanyu Pinyin: Dì shíyī huí
- Directed by: Chen Jianbin
- Written by: Chen Jianbin; Lei Zhilong; Niu Jianrong; Niu Niu
- Produced by: Jiang Qinqin; Bai Anwei; Zhu Ziliang
- Starring: Chen Jianbin; Zhou Xun; Dong Chengpeng; Leah Dou
- Cinematography: Guo Daming
- Edited by: Chen Jianbin; Yu Hongchao; Fang Yuan
- Music by: Chen Xiaoshu
- Production companies: Tianjin Maoyan Weiying Culture Media; CFGF; Tencent Pictures; Dong Shen Pictures; Jiabo Culture Development Co., Ltd; Horgos Free Time Film and Television Media Co., Ltd; Gabo Cultural Development Co., Ltd; Shanghai Tao Piao Piao Film and Television Culture Co., Ltd
- Release dates: 13 April 2019 (BJIFF); 2 April 2021 (China)
- Running time: 117 minutes
- Country: China
- Language: Mandarin
- Box office: CN¥73,971,000

The Eleventh Chapter (Chinese: 第十一回) is a 2019 Chinese dark comedy-drama film co-written and directed by Chen Jianbin, and starring Chen Jianbin, Zhou Xun, Dong Chengpeng and Leah Dou. The film was premiered at the 9th Beijing International Film Festival in April, 2019 and launched at 33rd Golden Rooster Awards on November 26, 2020. It was officially released in China on April 2, 2021.

== Synopsis ==
The local repertory theatre was rehearsing a play adapted from a real case. Ma Fuli, the person concerned, thought the story is inconsistent with the reality and asked for an explanation. His stepdaughter Jin Duoduo's premarital pregnancy got the whole family into trouble. Duoduo finally decided to abort the baby as Ma cannot clear his name from the suspicion of murder. To protect the baby, Ma pushed himself and the theatre into greater difficulties

== Cast ==
- Chen Jianbin as Ma Fuli
- Zhou Xun as Jin Cailing
- Leah Dou as Jin Duoduo
- Dong Chengpeng as Quentin Hu
- Jessie Li as Jia Meiyi
- Wang Xuebing as Lawyer Bai
- Song Jia as Zhen Manyu
- Niu Ben as Grandpa
- Liu Jinshan as Gou Yewu
- Qian Yu as Fu Kusi
- Jia Bing as brother Pi
- Huang Jianxin as leader
- Shi Hang as Dr. Hei
- Ling Fan as actress
- Li Jiuxiao as Zhen Dehua
- Zhang Junyi as Yao Danni
- Wu Enxuan as Xiao Dai
- Li Luqi as Liu Yisi

== Soundtrack ==
Credits from QQ Music

No.	Title	Performer	Length
1.	"Duoduo 多多"	Dou Jingtong	04:20
2.	"Three Dime Love 三毛钱爱情"	Chen Jianbin	04:49
3.	"Love Past 爱情往事"	Jia Yinan	01:33
4.	"Red Dream 红色的梦"	Jia Yinan	05:06
5.	"Apple 苹果"	Jia Yinan	01:38
6.	"Want 欲"	Jia Yinan	02:33
7.	"Angry 怒"	Jia Yinan	00:24
8.	"Sad 悲"	Jia Yinan	00:21
9.	"Hate 恨"	Jia Yinan	01:48
10.	"Pain 痛 (片段)"	Jia Yinan	01:58

== Awards and nominations ==
Award	Category	Recipients	Result
9th Beijing International Film Festival	Best Film	The Eleventh Chapter	Nominated
9th Beijing International Film Festival	Best Supporting Actress	Leah Dou	Won
9th Beijing International Film Festival	Best Screenplay	Chen Jianbin, Lei Zhilong, Niu Jianrong, Niu Niu	Won
30th Huading Awards	Best Actress	Zhou Xun	Nominated
30th Huading Awards	Best New Performer	Leah Dou	Nominated
13th China Film Director's Guild Awards	Best Film	The Eleventh Chapter	Shortlisted
13th China Film Director's Guild Awards	Best Director	Chen Jianbin	Shortlisted
13th China Film Director's Guild Awards	Best Screenwriter	Chen Jianbin, Lei Zhilong, Niu Jianrong, Niu Niu	Shortlisted
13th China Film Director's Guild Awards	Best Actor	Chen Jianbin	Won
13th China Film Director's Guild Awards	Best Actor	Da Peng	Shortlisted
13th China Film Director's Guild Awards	Best Actress	Zhou Xun	Won
13th China Film Director's Guild Awards	Best Actress	Leah Dou	Shortlisted
13th China Film Director's Guild Awards	Best Actress	Jessie Li	Shortlisted
