= Women Who Flirt =

2014 Chinese-Hong Kong film by Pang Ho-cheung

- Theatrical poster
- Directed by: Pang Ho-cheung
- Written by: Pang Ho-cheung; Luk Yee-sum; Zhang Youyou
- Produced by: Subi Liang; Wang Zhonglei; Pang Ho-cheung; Bernard Yang; Zhang Dajun
- Starring: Zhou Xun; Huang Xiaoming; Xie Yilin; Sonia Sui
- Cinematography: Jake Pollock
- Edited by: Wenders Li
- Music by: Alan Wong Ngai Lun; Janet Yung
- Production companies: Huayi Brothers; China Film Co-Production Corporation; Beijing Zhengxing Culture Media Co., Ltd.
- Distributed by: Huayi Brothers
- Release dates: November 28, 2014 (China); January 1, 2015 (Hong Kong)
- Running time: 95 minutes
- Countries: China; Hong Kong
- Language: Mandarin
- Box office: US$37,094,116

Women Who Flirt (Chinese: 撒娇女人最好命) is a 2014 romantic comedy film directed ánd written by Pang Ho-cheung and starring Zhou Xun, Huang Xiaoming, Xie Yilin and Sonia Sui. A Chinese-Hong Kong co-production, the film was released on November 28, 2014.

== Cast ==
- Zhou Xun as Zhang Hui
- Huang Xiaoming as Gong Zhiqiang
- Evonne Hsieh as Ruan Mei
- Sonia Sui as Bei Bei

== Reception ==
By December 20, 2014, the film had earned ¥223.54 million at the box office.

On Film Business Asia, Derek Elley gave the film a 6 out of 10, calling it a "loosely written rom-com [that] relies almost entirely on actress Zhou Xun's screen persona."

Anite Gates for the New York Times said, "The film is exaggerated, ludicrous and simplistic. It shows a towering disdain for both men and women. But Angie and Marco have a certain good-natured charm, and there are some nice shots of Shanghai."
