= Perhaps Love (2005 film) =

2005 Hong Kong film by Peter Chan

- DVD cover of Perhaps Love

Chinese name
- Traditional Chinese: 如果·愛
- Simplified Chinese: 如果·爱
Transcriptions
Yue: Cantonese
- Jyutping: Yu Gwo, Oi
- Directed by: Peter Chan
- Screenplay by: Aubrey Lam; Raymond To; James Yuen; Jessica Fong
- Story by: Raymond To; Theresa Tang
- Produced by: Peter Chan; Andre Morgan
- Starring: Zhou Xun; Takeshi Kaneshiro; Jacky Cheung
- Cinematography: Peter Pau
- Edited by: Wenders Li; Kwong Chi-leung
- Music by: Peter Kam; Leon Ko
- Production companies: Applause Pictures Limited; Ruddy Morgan Productions; Morgan & Chan Films
- Distributed by: Celestial Pictures (Worldwide); Applause Entertainment; Mega Star Video Distribution (HK) Limited; Pan Européenne Distribution (France); Wild Side Films (France); Shaw Organisation (Singapore)
- Release date: 8 December 2005; Thailand : April 2005
- Running time: 107 minutes
- Country: Hong Kong
- Languages: Cantonese; Mandarin
- Budget: US$10 million
- Box office: US$7 million

Perhaps Love is a 2005 Hong Kong musical film directed by Peter Chan, written by Lam Oi-wah and Raymond To, choreographed by Farah Khan and starring Zhou Xun, Takeshi Kaneshiro and Jacky Cheung. It was funded by Astro Shaw and TVB, and was distributed by Celestial Pictures. The film closed the 62nd Venice International Film Festival. It was submitted by Hong Kong as its official entry for the 78th Academy Awards.

== Plot ==
A Chinese director Mr. Wen decides to make a musical movie starring his Chinese girlfriend Sun Na and Hong Kong actor Jian-dong. Unknown to him, Sun has met Jiandong before ten years ago when she was a cabaret singer in Beijing. The two had a short-time relationship together then, when Jiandong was a film student. Ten years later, now a huge movie star, Sun refuses to acknowledge they have met before.

Mr. Wen plans his musical, which includes a plot where a girl lost her memory and comes to live with a circus troupe. Sun plays the amnesiac girl and Jiandong tried to get back the old past. As the shooting of the film starts, movie life and real life overlap. Jiandong tried desperately to get back Sun's lost love, while Mr. Wen discovered their past story. Mr. Wen himself played the role of the obsessive circus owner in the musical, who was involved in a love impossibility.

In the end of the movie, all characters, specially the character "Jiandong" grew up and found the truth and the meaning of "let the past be gone" and live with "the present. "

== Cast ==
- Zhou Xun as Sun Na
- Takeshi Kaneshiro as Jiandong
- Jacky Cheung as Mr. Wen
- Ji Jin-hee as Monty – A fantasy character who has a number of different roles in the film including a noodle shop owner and a reporter.
- Sandra Ng as Jiandong's manager
- Eric Tsang as Producer

== Production ==
Perhaps Love was filmed in Beijing and Shanghai. The film is the first musical blockbuster film to be produced in China in 35 years.

Estimates put the cost of the film at about US$10 million to produce. The film earned US$2.2 million on its opening weekend.

== Soundtrack ==
The soundtrack was released in two versions: a single-disc version in a jewel case and a limited-edition, double-disc, boxed set version. The double-disc version was marketed as a "Special Deluxe Edition" and included a bright red slipcase (embossed to look like leather) with gold lettering. The slipcase was seven and three-fourths inches tall, one and three-fourths inches deep, and five and three-fourths inches wide. It included a twenty-eight-page hardcover book, printed on thick paper, which included a synopsis of the film and brief biographies of its stars in both Mandarin and English. The book also included eighteen color photographs. The soundtrack was presented in a folding case with the music on a compact disc and a "making of" movie on a DVD disc. The folding case also included five postcards (including one for each of the film's four major stars) and a poster.

Perhaps Love - Original Soundtrack [Special Deluxe Edition]

Soundtrack album by Various artists
- Released: 21 November 2005
- Genre: Film soundtrack
- Label: EMI Music

No.	Title	Performer	Length
1.	"Prologue 序 (instrumental)"		03:03
2.	"Life's Montage 人生蒙太奇"	Ji Jin-hee	03:21
3.	"Who Are You? 忘了我是誰"	Takeshi Kaneshiro, Zhou Xun	03:22
4.	"Wai Mian De Shi Jie 外面的世界"	Chyi Chin	05:19
5.	"A Beautiful Story 美麗故事"	Ji Jin-hee, Takeshi Kaneshiro	03:14
6.	"You Do Love Me 妳是愛我的"	Jacky Cheung	03:16
7.	"The World Out There 外面"	Zhou Xun	01:42
8.	"Men Are Born Jealous 男人本該妒忌"	Jacky Cheung	02:49
9.	"Crossroad 十字街頭"	Takeshi Kaneshiro, Zhou Xun	04:16
10.	"Hui Yi Zhi Lu 回憶之旅 (instrumental)"		03:29
11.	"What If 假如"	Takeshi Kaneshiro	02:02
12.	"Fate 命運曲"	Jacky Cheung, Ji Jin-hee	06:24
13.	"Perhaps Love 如果．愛"	Jacky Cheung	03:51
14.	"A Beautiful Story 美麗故事 (instrumental)"		03:45
15.	"The World Out There (Radio Mix) 外面 (Radio Mix)"	Zhou Xun	03:43

== Musical movie and director ==
In an interview with media, director Peter Chan stressed that "Perhaps Love is a love story, not a musical. It's not even being promoted as a musical. It's not a musical in the conventional sense. My characters don't break out into song. Initially, it was a challenge to balance the over-the-top element in musicals and the subtleties of a movie. In the end, the method I used to overcome that was to make a movie-within-a-movie."

The film has also drawn comparisons to Bollywood, the Indian film industry famous for its musical films. The Hollywood Reporter described Perhaps Love as "Bollywood meets Bob Fosse." Bollywood director and choreographer Farah Khan choreographed the film, which featured nine Indian dancers who appeared in several musical numbers. The double-disc Region 3 editions of the film also contained a feature on the film's Bollywood dancers on the second disc.

== Home video ==
The DVD of the film was released in four different Region 3 DVD editions, including three versions released in Hong Kong and China: a single-disc edition, a double-disc "Special Edition", and a double-disc "Golden Limited Edition." A single-disc edition was also released in Korea and had Korean subtitles.

The "Special Edition" included a gold-colored cardboard slipcase and a digipak with two DVDs. The first disc, in DVD-9 format, contained the film with optional subtitles in English, traditional Chinese, or simplified Chinese. The second disc, in DVD-5 format, contained sixty minutes of bonus material, including a "making of" feature, a b-roll, additional information on the cast, an extended credit list, and a feature on the film's Bollywood dancers, as well as other clips.

The "Golden Limited Edition" was limited to only 4,000 copies and was essentially the same as the "Special Edition", except that it also included a hardcover book of nearly two dozen pages with a gold-coloured cover.

The film was also released on VCD in a three-disc set.

Unauthorized DVDs of the film appeared within days of the film being released in theatres, and were available for purchase for US$2-US$3.

== Awards and nominations ==
Zhou Xun won the 12th Hong Kong Film Critics Society Award in the Best Actress category and the film was named as the Recommended Film.

The film was also nominated for eleven 25th Hong Kong Film Awards. It won six awards: for Best Actress (Zhou Xun), Best Art Direction (Chung Man Yee and Pater Wong), Best Cinematography (Peter Pau and Christopher Doyle), Best Costume & Make Up Design (Chung Man Yee and Dora Ng), Best Original Film Score (Peter Kam and Leon Ko), and Best Original Film Song, "Perhaps Love" (this award was shared between composer Peter Kam, lyricist Him Yiu, and Jacky Cheung, who performed the song in the film).

The film won four awards at the 43rd Golden Horse Awards, which are: Best Actress (for Zhou Xun), Best Director (for Peter Chan), Best Cinematography (for Peter Pau) and Best Original Film Song (for Leon Ko)

Though Christopher Doyle worked on the cinematography for the film along with Oscar-winner Peter Pau, it is unclear whether he actually shared the Hong Kong Film Award with Peter Pau or not.

=== 25th Hong Kong Film Awards ===
- Won: Best Actress (Zhou Xun)
- Won: Best Art Direction (Chung Man Yee, Pater Wong)
- Won: Best Cinematography (Peter Pau)
- Won: Best Costume & Makeup Design (Chung Man Yee, Dora Ng)
- Won: Best Original Film Score (Peter Kam, Leon Ko)
- Won: Best Original Film Song (Peter Kam, Jacky Cheung)
- Nominated: Best Picture
- Nominated: Best Director (Peter Chan)
- Nominated: Best Film Editing (Wenders Li, Chi-Leung Kwong)
- Nominated: Best Screenplay (Oi Wah Lam, Raymond To)
- Nominated: Best Sound Design (Kinson Tsang)

=== 43rd Golden Horse Awards ===
- Won: Best Actress (Zhou Xun)
- Won: Best Cinematography (Peter Pau)
- Won: Best Director (Peter Chan)
- Won: Best Original Film Song (Leon Ko-song:Crossroad)
- Nominated: Best Film
- Nominated: Best Action Choreography (Wei Tung, Farah Khan)
- Nominated: Best Art Direction (Chung Man Yee, Pater Wong)
- Nominated: Best Film Editing (Wenders Li, Chi-Leung Kwong)
- Nominated: Best Makeup & Costume Design (Chung Man Yee)
- Nominated: Best Original Film Score (Peter Kam, Leon Ko)
- Nominated: Best Sound Effects (Kinson Tsang)
- Nominated: Best Visual Effects (Siu Lun Ho, Pornpol Sakarin)

== See also ==
- List of submissions to the 78th Academy Awards for Best Foreign Language Film
- List of Hong Kong submissions for the Academy Award for Best International Feature Film
