= Imperfect Victim =

- Promotional poster
- Chinese: 不完美受害人
- Hanyu Pinyin: Bù wánměi shòuhài rén
- Genre: Legal drama; Crime; Suspense
- Written by: Gao Xuan; Ren Baoru
- Directed by: Yang Yang
- Starring: Zhou Xun; Liu Yijun; Lin Yun; Elane Zhong; Chen Shu; Liu Ying; Dong Jie
- Theme music composer: Dong Dongdong; Chen Xi
- Ending theme: Imperfect by Mao Amin
- Country of origin: China
- Original language: Mandarin
- No. of seasons: 1
- No. of episodes: 29

Production
- Executive producers: Liang Qiuping; Huang Ya
- Production locations: Qingdao, Shandong
- Cinematography: Huang Zengxian
- Editor: Liu Qin
- Production companies: Beijing iQIYI Science & Technology Co., Ltd. Zhejiang Dongyang Haohan Film Entertainment Co., Ltd. Beijing Golden Pond Media Corp; Zhejiang Dongyang Haohan Film Entertainment Co., Ltd. Horgos Jifeng Culture Media Co., Ltd.

Original release
- Network: Dragon Television; Beijing TV; IQIYI
- Release: July 17 – August 1, 2023

Imperfect Victim (Chinese: 不完美受害人) is a 2023 Chinese legal drama television series directed by Yang Yang and starring Zhou Xun, Liu Yijun, Lin Yun, Elaine Zhong, Chen Shu, Liu Ying and Dong Jie. It aired on Dragon Television, Beijing TV and IQIYI on July 17, 2023.

The series ranked 9th on the list of "Top 10 Influential TV Series in China in 2023" selected by "Blue Book of Chinese Film & TV Series", which jointly launched by the Peking University's Research Center for Film and TV Drama, Institute for International Film & TV Development of Zhejiang University, 1905 Film Network, and China International Broadcast Publishing House. According to the National Radio and Television Administration, the series was the third highest-rated prime time drama in Chinese satellite television channel in 2023.

== Plot ==
The workplace sexual assault case, triggered by an anonymous third-party report, initially saw the victim, Zhao Xun (played by Lin Yun), denying any harm done. It was only five days later that she reported the assault and accused the perpetrator of rape. The defense attorney for the accused, Lin Kan (played by Zhou Xun), initiated a preliminary investigation, systematically dismantling the victim's accusations with irrefutable legal facts, swiftly bringing the truth to light and concluding the criminal investigation, prompting the police to drop the case.

To salvage his tarnished reputation and mitigate the adverse effects on his business, the accused Cheng Gong (played by Liu Yijun) took legal action against Zhao Xun for defamation, with Lin Kan representing him. As the case unfolded and details emerged, Zhao Xun became the target of online harassment, her personal and professional life crumbled, and she suffered from societal shaming and unemployment. Caught between legal facts and the subjective "objective truths" within her conscience, Lin Kan faced unprecedented ethical dilemmas in her career, unsure of how to proceed.

== Cast ==
- Zhou Xun as Lin Kan
  - He Yuhe as young Lin Kan
- Liu Yijun as Cheng Gong
- Lin Yun as Zhao Xun
- Zhong Chuxi as Yan Ming
- Chen Shu as Xin Lu
- Ying Er as Mi Mang
- Dong Jie as Li Yi
- Zhou Chengao as Kang Hui
- Hei Ze as Yin Sheng
- Guan Yunpeng as Chen Mo
- Liu Kejun as Xiao Mi
- Song Jialun as Ren Zheng
- Chi Peng as Li Ping
- Bao Dazhi as Zhao Min
- Su Yujie as Bao Li
- Chen Zhen as Fang Ping
- Chai Haowei as Zhu Lei
- Li Shengjiaas Jiang Xiao Ning
- Jie Bing as Chen Mo's father
- Sun Guitian as Grandma Feng
- Song Jiaxin as Wen Guang
- Li Yunao as Zhe Ran
- Cheng Junwen as He Lu
- Zhang Xiang as Liu Liang
- Tao Huimin as Lin Kan's mother
- Yang Zihua as Lin Kan's father
- Hao Ping as Mr. Long
- Zhu Tie as Yan Qiang
- Mu Liyan as Chen Mo's mother
- Cao Minghua as Team leader Wang
- Zhao Yansong as Director Luan
- Wang Jianxin as Director Liang
- Li Hongquan as director
- Lin Jing as Susan
- Wang Tonghui as Wu Ming Ren
- Yan Xiaopin as Mrs. Wu
- Zhou Haodong as presiding judge
- Yang Hanbin as Deputy Director
- Qu Jingjing as forensic scientist
- Yang Liye as Meng Mo
- Kong Songjin as female store manager
- Wang Dong as Mr. Lu
- Li Bin as Mr. Su
- Li Quanyou as President Xiao
- Xue Haoran as Secretary Wang
- Qian Yi as Chairman Huang
- Cheng Shiyu as President Zhao
- Lin Ziye as Xuan Xuan
- Chang Di as Team leader Qin
- Zheng Zhongyu as Kent
- Lin Xue as Bao Li's father
- Xiang Hong as Bao Li's mother
- Wang Pinyi as Team leader Pan
- Li Donghan as Du Wei Dong
- Zhao Shuyu as female secretary
- Sun Boyang as Sun Daquan
- Li Yan as criminal police
- Zhang Yidan as Lin Jing
- Zhu Haiyu as Cao Yu
- Ding Hong as driver
- Zhang Yihang as correction officer
- He Kai as captain
- Jin Chenbang as cellmate
- Li Hongzhuang as cellmate
- Chang Chaoyu as cellmate
- Guo Zi as Old Yu
- Yu Zecheng as Mi Man's son
- Yi Ran as Su Hao
- Liu Peng as host
- Qin Jinxiu as host
- Zhou Wenhao as bodyguard
- Xu Kejia as bodyguard
- Ma Yueye as secretary of chairman
- Han Shumei as financial manager
- Yu Zhiqiang as Dacheng supervisor
- Cao Nan as detachment criminal policeman
- Wei Zheng as Manager Sun
- Ge Jiwei as Team leader Cao
- Jing Lu as Head Nurse Wang
- Du Heqian as Chinese Communist Party Committee Secretary
- Gong Ying as leader
- Lin Jiaqi as Mary
- Song Meijie as Juan Zi
- Xue Rong as director
- Yin Yuanxhang as old man
- Sun Qingliang as Old Xu
- Zheng Xiaowan as Director of All-China Women's Federation
- Xu Sheng as CEO
- Wu Qian as Chief Public Relation Officer
- Cai Gang as President Fang
- Cong Linyi as interviewer
- Tian Miao as mediator
- Jiang Rong as CFO

== Ratings ==
- Highest ratings are marked in red, lowest ratings are marked in blue

Daily CVB Prime-time TV Series Ratings
Air date	Episode	Beijing TV	Dragon TV
Air date	Episode	Ratings (%)	Ratings (%)
July 17, 2023	01–02	0.315	0.692
July 18, 2023	03–04	0.349	0.755
July 19, 2023	05–06	0.351	0.776
July 20, 2023	07–08	0.352	0.829
July 21, 2023	09	0.382	0.849
July 22, 2023	10	0.367	0.827
July 23, 2023	11–12	0.413	0.915
July 24, 2023	13–14	0.399	0.836
July 25, 2023	15–16	0.399	0.839
July 26, 2023	17–18	0.404	0.863
July 27, 2023	19–20	0.382	0.852
July 28, 2023	21	0.376	0.861
July 29, 2023	21–23	0.419	0.937
July 30, 2023	24–25	0.448	0.967
July 31, 2023	26–27	0.424	0.924
August 1, 2023	28–29	0.434	0.976

Weekly CVB Prime-time TV Series Ratings
Week	Episode	Beijing TV			Dragon TV		
Week	Episode	Ratings (%)	Audience share (%)	Rank	Ratings (%)	Audience share (%)	Rank
July 15–21, 2023	01–09	0.346	1.461	9	0.773	3.256	7
July 22–28, 2023	10–21	0.395	1.652	7	0.858	3.586	4
July 29-August 4, 2023	22–29	0.431	1.700	6	0.951	3.748	3

== Soundtrack ==
Credits are adapted from QQ Music
No.	Title	Lyrics	Music	Singers	Length
1.	"Imperfect (不完美)" (Ending theme song)	Chen Xi	Dong Dongdong; Yan Tianwu; Liu Tao	Mao Amin	04:25
2.	"I Know (我知道)" (Theme song)	Chen Xi	Xue Feng; Dong Dongdong	Yisa Yu	03:07
3.	"Rough Hill (荒丘)"	Chen Xi; Dong Dongdong	Dong Dongdong	Liu Xijun	03:28
4.	"Hello Cinderella (你好灰姑娘)"	Chen Xi	Dong Dongdong	Zhang Yuan	04:07

== Awards and nominations ==
Award	Category	Nominated work	Result	Ref.
14th Macau International Television Festival	Best Television Series	Imperfect Victim	Nominated	
14th Macau International Television Festival	Best Actress	Zhou Xun	Nominated	
14th Macau International Television Festival	Best Actor	Liu Yijun	Nominated	
14th Macau International Television Festival	Best Supporting Actress	Dong Jie	Nominated	
14th Macau International Television Festival	Outstanding Actor Award	Lin Yun	Nominated	
14th Macau International Television Festival	Best Director	Yang Yang	Won	
14th Macau International Television Festival	Best Screenplay	Gao Xuan, Ren Baoru	Won	
2023 National Drama Festival	Best TV Series of the Year	Imperfect Victim	Won	
National Radio and Television Administration	2023 Chinese TV Series Selection	Imperfect Victim	Won	
7th Television Series of China Quality Ceremony	Outstanding TV Series of the Year	Imperfect Victim	Won	
7th Television Series of China Quality Ceremony	Outstanding Quality Actress of the Year	Zhou Xun	Won	
7th Television Series of China Quality Ceremony	Quality Stylish Actor of the Year	Dong Jie	Won	
7th Television Series of China Quality Ceremony	Quality Stylish Actor of the Year	Ying Er	Won	
7th Television Series of China Quality Ceremony	Quality Leap Actor	Lin Yun	Won	
7th Television Series of China Quality Ceremony	Quality Leap Actor	Zhong Chuxi	Won	
7th Television Series of China Quality Ceremony	Quality Innovation Director of the Year	Yang Yang	Won	
7th Television Series of China Quality Ceremony	Original Screenplay of the Year	Gao Xuan, Ren Baoru	Won	
7th Television Series of China Quality Ceremony	Outstanding Producer	Liu Tao	Won	
2024 Television Directors Conference	Best TV Series of the Year	Imperfect Victim	Won	
2024 Television Directors Conference	Best Director of the Year	Yang Yang	Won	
2024 Television Directors Conference	Best Actress of the Year	Zhou Xun	Won	
2024 Television Directors Conference	Best Supporting Actress of the Year	Chen Shu	Won	
29th Shanghai Television Festival	Best Original Screenplay	Gao Xuan, Ren Baoru	Won	
29th Shanghai Television Festival	Best Actress	Zhou Xun	Won	
29th Shanghai Television Festival	Best Television Series	Imperfect Victim	Nominated	
29th Shanghai Television Festival	Best Director	Yang Yang	Nominated	
34th Flying Apsaras Awards	Outstanding Drama Series (Fiery Life & People's Epic)	Imperfect Victim	Nominated	
2024 Asia Contents Awards & Global OTT Awards	Best Asian TV Series	Imperfect Victim	Nominated	
2024 Asia Contents Awards & Global OTT Awards	Best Lead Actress	Zhou Xun	Nominated	
32nd China TV Golden Eagle Awards	Best Television Series	Imperfect Victim	Nominated	
32nd China TV Golden Eagle Awards	Best Actress	Zhou Xun	Nominated	
32nd China TV Golden Eagle Awards	Best Screenwriter	Gao Xuan, Ren Baoru	Nominated	
29th Asian Television Awards	Best Original Digital Drama Series	Imperfect Victim	Nominated	
29th Asian Television Awards	Best Actress in a Leading Role	Zhou Xun	Nominated	
29th Asian Television Awards	Best Scriptwriting	Gao Xuan, Ren Baoru	Nominated	
