= Painted Skin (2008 film) =

- Theatrical release poster
- Directed by: Gordon Chan
- Screenplay by: Gordan Chan; Abe Kwong; Lau Ho-leung
- Based on: Strange Stories from a Chinese Studio by Pu Songling
- Produced by: Gordon Chan
- Starring: Donnie Yen; Zhou Xun; Chen Kun; Zhao Wei; Sun Li
- Cinematography: Arthur Wong
- Edited by: Chan Ki-hop
- Music by: Ikurō Fujiwara
- Production companies: Golden Sun Film Co., Ltd. Golden Sun Films Holdings Ltd. Mediacorp Raintree Pictures; Shanghai Film Group; Ning Xia Film Studio; Dinglongda (Beijing) International Culture Media Co., Ltd. Eastern Mordor Film Co., Ltd. Wuhan Huaqi Movies & TV Production Co., Ltd. Beijing New Film Association Co., Ltd.
- Distributed by: Eastern Mordor; Intercontinental Film Distributors (Hong Kong); Beijing Time (China)
- Release dates: 25 September 2008 (Hong Kong); 26 September 2008 (China)
- Running time: 115 minutes
- Countries: China; Hong Kong; Singapore
- Language: Mandarin
- Budget: ¥80 million
- Box office: ¥227 million

Painted Skin (Chinese: 畫皮) is a 2008 supernatural-fantasy film directed by Gordon Chan, starring Donnie Yen, Zhou Xun, Chen Kun, Zhao Wei, Sun Li and Qi Yuwu. The film is co-produced by China, Hong Kong, and Singapore. Although the film is based partly on a supernatural premise, it is more of an action-romance than a horror film. Painted Skin is based, very loosely, on "The Painted Skin", a short story from the collection Strange Stories from a Chinese Studio. The theme song of the film, Huà Xīn (畫心; Painted Heart), was performed by Jane Zhang.

== Plot ==
General Wang Sheng and his men attack a Xiongnu camp. There, he meets a woman named Xiaowei, who is actually a fox spirit who feasts on human hearts to maintain a youthful appearance. Xiaowei falls in love with Wang, who is already married to Peirong. In the city, a murder spree in which victims have their hearts cut out begins. Peirong becomes suspicious that Xiaowei is a demon responsible for the slayings. She decides to ask Pang Yong, a retired General who was in love with her, for help. Meanwhile, Pang Yong befriends Xia Bing, a young and inexperienced demon hunter. In actuality, Xiaoyi, a demon who is in love with Xiaowei and has been supplying her with the hearts, is responsible for the killings.

Pang Yong and Xia Bing go to Wang Sheng's house and unsuccessfully accuse Xiaowei of being a demon. Xiaoyi gets increasingly jealous of Xiaowei and Wang Sheng's increasing companionship, but Xiaowei demands that he leave. Before leaving, Xiaoyi warns Xiaowei that demons and humans cannot love each other. That night, Peirong witnesses Xiaowei turn into her true form. Xiaowei agrees to stop killing if Peirong gives up her spot as Wang Sheng's spouse. However, Xiaowei gives Peirong a potion that makes her resemble a demon. The city's residents become horrified and accuse her of the killings, but Peirong is saved by Pang Yong and Xia Bing.

Wang Sheng, Xiaowei, and his soldiers descend upon the cave where Pang Yong and Xia Bing hide Peirong. After Wang swears to kill Peirong if she is a demon, Peirong uses his dagger to impale herself and dies. Xiaowei realizes that Wang will never love her after he ignores her attempts to comfort him. Pang Yong exposes Xiaowei's identity and tries to slash her with his sword, but she is unharmed. Wang Sheng begs Xiaowei to revive Peirong, but she asks what she will receive in return. Wang replies that he loves her, but belongs to Peirong, and kills himself.

An anguished Xiaowei reveals her demon form and tries to revive Wang. However, she is interrupted by Xiaoyi, who reprimands her for sacrificing her powers to save a man's life. He consumes the orb and vows to bring her home. Pang Yong and Xia Bing slay Xiaoyi, but Pang is killed in the fight. Xiaowei retrieves her orb from Xiaoyi's body as well as his orb and uses them to revive everyone, sacrificing her powers again.

== Cast ==
- Donnie Yen as Pang Yong (龐勇)
- Zhou Xun as Xiaowei (小唯)
- Chen Kun as Wang Sheng (王生)
- Zhao Wei as Peirong (佩蓉)
- Sun Li as Xia Bing (夏冰)
- Qi Yuwu as Xiaoyi (小易)

== Production ==
When the film was announced, Wilson Yip was reportedly directing with Fan Bingbing starring as the female lead. However, several months later the director's seat was changed from Yip to Gordon Chan instead, with Zhou Xun replacing Fan as well.

== Reception ==
The box office for "Painted Skin" broke 100 million yuan, or 14 million US Dollars, six days after its premiere, thereby setting a new milestone for Chinese films.

=== Awards and nominations ===
3rd Asian Film Awards

- Nominated: Best Actress (Zhao Wei)
- Nominated: Best Production Design

10th Changchun Film Festival

- Won: Best Film Score (Ikurō Fujiwara)

27th Golden Rooster Awards

- Nominated: Best Director (Gordon Chan)
- Nominated: Best Actress (Zhao Wei)
- Nominated: Best Supporting Actress (Sun Li)

28th Hong Kong Film Awards

- Won: Best Cinematography (Arthur Wong)
- Won: Best Original Film Song (Fujiwara Ikuro, Keith Chan, Jane Zhang)
- Nominated: Best Film
- Nominated: Best Screenplay (Gordon Chan, Lau Ho-Leung & Kwong Man-Wai)
- Nominated: Best Actress (Zhou Xun)
- Nominated: Best Supporting Actress (Sun Li)
- Nominated: Best Art Direction (Bill Lui & Liu Jingping)
- Nominated: Best Costume Makeup Design (Ng Po-Ling)
- Nominated: Best Action Choreography (Stephen Tung)
- Nominated: Best Original Film Score (Fujiwara Ikuro)
- Nominated: Best Sound Editing (Kinson Tsang & Lai Chi-Hung)
- Nominated: Best Visual Effects (Ng Yuen-Fai, Chas Chau & Tam Kai-Kwan)

30th Hundred Flowers Awards

- Won: Best Actor (Chen Kun)
- Nominated: Best Actress (Zhou Xun)
- Nominated: Best Supporting Actress (Sun Li)

16th Spring Swallow Awards

- Won: Best Actress in a Motion Picture (Zhao Wei)

2nd Vietnam DAN Movie Awards

- Won: Favorite Chinese Actress (Zhao Wei)

== Television series ==
In March 2011, a Chinese television series also titled Painted Skin, which is based on the film, was aired on TVS4 in mainland China. Gordon Chan and the producers of the film Painted Skin were also involved in the production of this television series, which has a revised script and new cast members.

== Sequel ==
In 2011, Gordon Chan announced that a sequel would be produced, and that Chen Kun, Zhou Xun, and Zhao Wei would be returning for the sequel, but that Donnie Yen would not. Other actors such as Yang Mi, Feng Shaofeng and Gordon Liu joined the cast. Liu was cast to play the father of Chen's character, while Yang and Feng were cast to play a pair of lovers. Chan chose Yang and Feng for the roles due to their popularity in the 2011 television series Palace.

The sequel, Painted Skin: The Resurrection, was released in 2012. It grossed $115.07 million, and briefly became the highest-grossing domestic film in China.
