= Teng Congcong =

Chinese director and screenwriter (born 1985)

- Born: 1985 (age 40–41); China
- Education: Beijing Film Academy
- Occupations: Director; screenwriter
- Years active: 2009–present

Chinese name
- Simplified Chinese: 滕丛丛
Transcriptions

Teng Congcong (Chinese: 滕丛丛) is a Chinese film director and screenwriter. Her work is known for exploring the female experience and the struggles of women in Chinese society. She is best known for her film Send Me to the Clouds (2019) and the television series To the Wonder (2024).

== Early life ==
Teng was born in 1985 in China. She attended Beijing Film Academy, and studied under famed Chinese film director Xie Fei. After earning both a bachelor's and a master's degree in film directing, Teng graduated from the academy in 2009.

== Career ==
Teng spent many of the early years of her career working as an editor on others' films. She shot multiple short films before making her feature film directorial debut with the 2019 drama Send Me to the Clouds. Beginning in 2013, Teng spent four years writing the screenplay for the film. The main character, Sheng Nan, is a journalist, and Teng spent hours shadowing many different journalists to learn more about the job and the work they do. Once casting began, Yao Chen, Yuan Hong, and Li Jiuxiao were cast in starring roles. Yao Chen joined the film after one of the film's producers, Dun He, passed the script to her. Yao Chen also served as the producer of the project. In an interview with Baidu, Teng stated that, "Yao Chen is someone who values the script above all else. We are both very open and sincere, and we have a great chemistry. We both want to create a good work, and that sincerity is evident in our words."

Send Me to the Clouds was released widely on 16 August 2019. The film was a mild commercial success at the box office. Made on a budget of US$1.4 million (RMB 10 million), the film grossed US$4.3 million (RMB 29.5 million) at the box office. Critically, the reviews were mixed. Elizabeth Kerr from the Hollywood Reporter stated that, "as a director, Teng isn’t a standout stylist, and the film’s technical specs are perfectly adequate, not flashy. Similarly, Send Me to the Clouds doesn’t go out of its way to be overly confrontational, but the combination of Yao-approved female independence, a portrait of defiance and frank acknowledgement of things like ovaries make it something of a cinematic roar — and universal despite its geographic specificity." Nicholas Olczak from Eastern Kicks stated that Teng "has really shown her talent with this lively and engaging film which offers a sharp satire of today’s money-obsessed, morally adrift Chinese society."

Teng's next directorial work, To the Wonder, began production in 2020. Centered around the lives of Kazakh nomads in Altay, the series was adapted from an essay in Chinese writer Li Juan's essay collection My Altay. Production and interviews of Altay locals began in 2020. Ma Yili, Zhou Yiran, and Yu Shi were cast in the starring roles. Filming began in April 2023 and lasted for 56 days.

The series was released in 2024 to critical acclaim. At the 2024 7th annual Cannes Series Festival, To The Wonder was selected for the Best Long Drama Competition, making it the first Chinese-language long drama to be nominated in that category. After its premiere on China Central Television, the drama consistently topped the viewership ratings in its time slot. Within a week of its release, it had more than 100 million online viewers. Lead actor Yu Shi publicly praised her directorial vision. In an interview with French magazine Prestige, he stated that "with her delicate sensibility she’s good at observing the details, and knows how to portray female innocence and difficulties in life, but she’s also capable of finding men’s charm and magnifying it from a women’s perspective."

== Filmmaking style ==
Teng is known for films that challenge traditional Chinese views on women and their role in culture. In an interview with American magazine Variety about Send Me to the Clouds, Teng stated that, “I was drawn to my topic because the existing Chinese films about women’s issues are a bit narrow, and are mostly about rural women in the countryside or older women of nanny age. There aren’t a lot of stories about modern, urban women facing the confusion of their everyday lives." She continued by arguing that, “I don’t think romantic films have been well executed enough in the Chinese market. It’s not that there’s not enough of an audience for this type of film, it’s that there are very few works that are down-to-earth, where the story feels very real and relatable. It’s an area we can really develop and improve.” She has previously stated that she is a "conservative feminist".

== Filmography ==
| Year | Title | Director | Writer | Producer | Ref(s) |
|---|---|---|---|---|---|
| 2019 | Send Me to the Clouds | Yes | Yes | No | |
| 2024 | To the Wonder | Yes | Yes | No | |

== Awards and nominations ==
| Award | Year | Category | Nominee(s) / work(s) | Result | Ref. |
|---|---|---|---|---|---|
| Asia Contents Awards & Global OTT Awards | 2024 | Best Asian TV Series | To The Wonder | Nominated | |
| Asia Contents Awards & Global OTT Awards | 2024 | Best Writer | Teng Congcong, Peng Yining | Nominated | |
| Asian Television Awards | 2024 | Best Drama Series | To The Wonder | Won | |
| Asian Television Awards | 2024 | Best Direction (Drama or Fiction) | Teng Congcong | Nominated | |
| Shanghai Television Festival | 2025 | Best TV Series | To The Wonder | Won | |
| Shanghai Television Festival | 2025 | Best Director | Teng Congcong | Nominated | |
| Shanghai Television Festival | 2025 | Best Adapted Screenplay | Teng Congcong, Peng Yining | Nominated | |
| Shanghai Television Festival | 2025 | International Communication Award (TV Drama) | To The Wonder | Won | |
