= Biao Ren =

Chinese manhua and donghua series

- Volume one cover of Biao Ren, featuring Dao Ma

镖人
- Genre: Adventure; Historical fantasy; Martial arts
- Author: Xianzhe Xu
- Publisher: New Comics, Tencent Comics, Beijing United Publishing Company
- Other publishers: Bilibili comics, Youyaoqi Comics
- Original run: 2015
- Volumes: 13

Biao Ren
- Also known as: Biao Ren: Blades of the Guardians
- Written by: Wen Zhang; Xianzhe Xu
- Directed by: Juansheng Shi; Zhiwei Deng
- Composers: Zoey (Yang Ziyi); Zhu Ruiwen
- Country of origin: China
- Original language: Chinese
- No. of episodes: 15

Production
- Executive producers: Wu Mian; Xiuyu Niu
- Producer: Sun Zhonghuai
- Production companies: Tencent Penguin Pictures; Colored Pencil Animation

Original release
- Network: Tencent Video
- Release: 1 June 2023 – present

Biao Ren or Blades of the Guardians (镖人), is a Chinese manhua that was written and illustrated by Xianzhe Xu. It was first serialized in the New Comics app in July 2015. The manhua quickly attracted a large number of readers and was well received. Since its first serialization, Biao Ren has had over two billion readings on 50 mainland Chinese online platforms. As of August 2024, Beijing United Publishing Company has released twelve bound volumes.

Tencent Penguin Pictures and Colored Pencil Animation Group co-produced an animated (donghua) television adaptation that exclusively premiered on Tencent Video from June to August 2023. A second season has been announced and is set to premiere in 2026.

A film adaptation directed by Yuen Woo-ping and starring Wu Jing, Nicholas Tse, Yu Shi and Jet Li was released in 2026. A television drama is also in development.

== Plot ==
Hired fighters called Escorts protect targets, criminals for whom the government has issued an arrest warrant. On the eve of civil unrest in the last years of the Sui dynasty, a government of fear and terror is gaining power in China, and feelings of hatred and enmity are emerging among some people. A bounty hunter named Dao Ma travels throughout ancient China with his three-year-old son Xiao Qi and lives with the power of his sword. One day Dao Ma accepts a mission for which he is guided to the city of Changan. He plans to pay off his debt to a therapist named Mo, and when he travels in the western desert, he accepts a simple mission that turns into a critical, dangerous issue.

== Production ==
Xu Xianzhe was influenced by Japanese manga artists Takehiko Inoue and Hiroshi Hirata.

Xianzhe Xu wanted to tell a story of the late Sui dynasty by combining martial arts with western genre elements. Xianzhe Xu had no art training so he began to practice and hone his drawing skills for four years, and researched the weapons, historical items and history of Sui and Tang dynasties. The art style of Biao Ren has been compared to that of three Japanese manga series: Vagabond, Blade of the Immortal, and Sōten Kōro. The author paid attention to details to present a story that is about emotions and destruction in a dark, historical era of ancient China.

== Media ==
=== Manhua ===
The Biao Ren manhua was serialized on the new comics app on July 1, 2015. The work quickly attracted a large number of readers and was well received. The electronic version is now serialized on online platform Tencent Comics. On April 1, 2018, Beijing United Publishing Company published the first volume of Biao Ren. As of August 2024, twelve volumes have been released. Later, the series was published on Japanese reading platform Mecha Comic. As of August 8, 2019, Shōnen Gahōsha released three volumes in Japanese. In Germany, the manhua is licensed by Chinabooks.

==== Volume list ====
No.	Chinese release date	Chinese ISBN
1	April 1, 2018	978-7-55-961297-7
2	June 1, 2018	978-7-55-961546-6
3	August 1, 2018	978-7-55-962275-4
4	October 1, 2018	978-7-55-962579-3
5	January 1, 2019	978-7-55-962844-2
6	June 1, 2019	978-7-55-963030-8
7	July 1, 2019	978-7-55-963167-1
8	September 1, 2019	978-7-55-943169-1
9	January 1, 2020	978-7-55-944162-1
10	July 1, 2020	978-7-55-944943-6
11	March 1, 2022	978-7-55-965914-9
12	August 1, 2024	978-7-55-967756-3

=== Donghua ===
In August 2020, a donghua adaptation was announced by Tencent Penguin Pictures. The Blades of the Guardians donghua series was produced by the Colored Pencil Animation Group (Chinese corporation Chongqing Colored Pencil Animation Design Co., Ltd.; Colored Pencil Animation Japan Co., Ltd.). It ran for 15 episodes, exclusively airing from June 1, to August 17, 2023, on Tencent Video.

=== Episode list ===
No.	Title	Directed by	Written by	Original release date
1	Transliteration: "Guards Beyond the Great Wall" (Chinese: 塞外镖客)	Hiromatsu Shu & Zhiwei Deng	Wen Zhang & Xu Xianzhe	June 1, 2023
2	Transliteration: "The Two-Headed Snake" (Chinese: 双头蛇)	Hiromatsu Shu & Zhiwei Deng	Wen Zhang & Xu Xianzhe	June 1, 2023
3	Transliteration: "Stormy Wind" (Chinese: 风起云涌)	Hiromatsu Shu & Zhiwei Deng	Wen Zhang & Xu Xianzhe	June 8, 2023
4	Transliteration: "Jade face and beauty" (Chinese: 玉面与红颜)	Hiromatsu Shu & Zhiwei Deng	Wen Zhang & Xu Xianzhe	June 8, 2023
5	Transliteration: "Transaction" (Chinese: 交易)	Hiromatsu Shu & Zhiwei Deng	Wen Zhang & Xu Xianzhe	June 15, 2023
6	Transliteration: "Chessboard" (Chinese: 棋与局)	Hiromatsu Shu & Zhiwei Deng	Wen Zhang & Xu Xianzhe	June 15, 2023
7	Transliteration: "The Children of the Wolf" (Chinese: 狼的孩子们)	Hiromatsu Shu & Zhiwei Deng	Wen Zhang & Xu Xianzhe	June 22, 2023
8	Transliteration: "The Storm is Coming" (Chinese: 风沙将至)	Hiromatsu Shu & Zhiwei Deng	Wen Zhang & Xu Xianzhe	June 29, 2023
9	Transliteration: "People of the Desert" (Chinese: 荒漠之民)	Hiromatsu Shu & Zhiwei Deng	Wen Zhang & Xu Xianzhe	July 6, 2023
10	Transliteration: "The Great Sandstorm" (Chinese: 大沙暴)	Hiromatsu Shu & Zhiwei Deng	Wen Zhang & Xu Xianzhe	July 13, 2023
11	Transliteration: "Flower face group" (Chinese: 花颜团)	Hiromatsu Shu & Zhiwei Deng	Wen Zhang & Xu Xianzhe	July 20, 2023
12	Transliteration: "Khan and the General" (Chinese: 可汗与将军)	Hiromatsu Shu & Zhiwei Deng	Wen Zhang & Xu Xianzhe	July 27, 2023
13	Transliteration: "the truth" (Chinese: 真相)	Hiromatsu Shu & Zhiwei Deng	Wen Zhang & Xu Xianzhe	August 3, 2023
14	Transliteration: "The winner and crown" (Chinese: 胜者与王冠)	Hiromatsu Shu & Zhiwei Deng	Wen Zhang & Xu Xianzhe	August 10, 2023
15	Transliteration: "Daughter of the desert" (Chinese: 大漠的女儿)	Hiromatsu Shu & Zhiwei Deng	Wen Zhang & Xu Xianzhe	August 17, 2023

== Adaptations ==
In July 2023, it was announced that a film and television drama adaptation of the Biao Ren manhua was in development. In December 2023, it was revealed that Yuen Woo-ping would direct the live-action film. In June 2024, Wu Jing was reported to be the film's producer along with being selected to play the lead role of Dao Ma, with Nicholas Tse joining the cast. Filming officially began on July 26 of the same year in Xinjiang. In the following months Yu Shi and Jet Li joined the cast.

The film, titled Blades of the Guardians, was released in China in February 2026.

== Reception ==
Biao Ren received highly positive reviews for its artwork and storyline. The manhua has garnered widespread acclaim domestically, and currently has a rating of 9.9 out of 10 on Tencent Animation and Comics. It was featured three times on the Japanese public broadcaster NHK, where it was praised as "a world-class masterpiece of Chinese comics". The series has been praised by some popular Japanese manga artists, including Rumiko Takahashi and Tōru Fujisawa.

Volume one of the manhua sold over 100,000 copies in China within a month of its launch. By 2021, sales of the first ten volumes exceeded one million copies. The twelfth volume was ranked the fifth-top-selling comic title of the week in Douban. Since its first publication in 2015, the Biao Ren manhua had been viewed on 30 online platforms over a billion times by September 2018, and over two billion times on more than 50 domestic online platforms by June 2023.

The donghua adaptation was also well-received by domestic audiences, garnering an 8.4 out of 10 rating on Douban. Outside China, it was regarded as one of the 15 best donghua series by Legit.ng writer Night Mongina. Margarida Bastos of Collider commented on the unique animation style and "stunning imagery" showcased in the trailer for the animated adaptation.

=== Awards and nominations ===
Year	Award	Category	Nominated work	Results	Ref.
2023	20th China Animation Golden Dragon Award	Best Serial Animation Award (Gold Award)	Biao Ren	Won	
2023	20th China Animation Golden Dragon Award	Best Art Direction for Animation	Zhiwei Deng & Juansheng Shi	Won	
2023	20th China Animation Golden Dragon Award	Most Reputation Animation of the Year	Biao Ren	Won	
2024	29th Shanghai Television Festival	Best Animation	Biao Ren	Nominated	
2024	29th Shanghai Television Festival	Best Storytelling (Animation)	Biao Ren	Nominated	
