= 29th Shanghai Television Festival =

2024 TV festival and award ceremony for international and Chinese TV programming

- Promotional poster
- Presented by: National Radio and Television Administration; China Media Group; Shanghai Municipal People's Government
- Date: 24-28 June 2024
- Site: Lingang Performing Arts Center, Shanghai
- Hosted by: Cao Kefan; Chen Chen; Feng Lin; Yu Shi

Highlights
- Best Television show: Blossoms Shanghai
- Best Director: Xin Shuang; The Long Season
- Best Actor: Hu Ge; Blossoms Shanghai
- Best Actress: Zhou Xun; Imperfect Victim
- Best Supporting Actor: Ning Li; Ripe Town
- Best Supporting Actress: Jiang Yan; Always On the Move
- Most awards: Blossoms Shanghai (5)
- Most nominations: Blossoms Shanghai (9)

Television coverage
- Network: Dragon Television by Shanghai Media Group

The 29th Shanghai Television Festival (simplified Chinese: 第29届上海电视节; traditional Chinese: 第29屆上海電視節; also known as 29th Shanghai TV Festival Magnolia Awards) ceremony was held at Lingang Performing Arts Center in Shanghai, China on June 28, 2024. The festival took place from 24 to 28 June 2024, hosted by the National Radio and Television Administration, China Media Group, and the Shanghai Municipal People's Government, and organized by Shanghai Municipal Administration of Radio and Television and Shanghai Media Group, with co-organization by the Administration Committee of Lin-gang Special Area of China (Shanghai) Pilot Free Trade Zone, and special support from Shanghai Lingang Special Area Investment Holding (Group) Co., Ltd. The Magnolia Awards were divided into categories for TV series (including Chinese-language TV series and foreign TV series), documentaries, animations, and variety shows. The aim is to honor Chinese-language TV series and variety shows broadcast between April 1, 2023, and March 31, 2024, as well as foreign TV series, documentaries, and animations broadcast from March 1, 2023, until February 29, 2024. The nominations for 17 categories were announced on May 30, 2024, Wong Kar-wai's TV series Blossoms Shanghai led all programs with 9 total nominations, followed by The Long Season and Always On The Move tied with 5 nominations each.

At the award ceremony held on June 28, 2024, Blossoms Shanghai led all series with 5 wins including Best Television Series, Best Actor, Best Art Direction, Best Cinematography, and Best Adapted Screenplay. Meanwhile, Zhou Xun and Hu Ge also won the Best Actress and Best Actor awards for the second time after their previous wins in 2015 and 2016 ceremonies, respectively.

== Jury ==
The following are the members of the jury for each selection.

=== TV Series Section ===
- Yan Jiangang, Chinese director (Jury President).

==== Chinese-language TV series ====
- Hai Qing, Chinese actress
- Han Zhong, Chinese art director
- Li Yuesen, Chinese writer, film and television commentary
- Wang Xiaoqiang, Chinese scriptwriter
- Yang Lei, Chinese director
- You Yongzhi, Chinese actor

==== Foreign TV Series ====
- Eirwen Davies, British producer
- Andy Frien, French actor

=== Documentary Section ===
- Vikram Channa, Indian director and producer (Jury President)
- Xiao Han, Chinese director
- Ton van Zantvoort, Dutch documentary filmmaker.

=== Animation Section ===
- Frédéric Puech, French animation producer (Jury President)
- Chen Liaoyu, Chinese animation director
- Mari Okada, Japanese animation screenwriter and director.

== Winners and nominees ==
Nominees were announced on 30 May 2024.

The winners are listed first and in bold.

=== Chinese-language TV series section ===
Best Television Series	Best Director
**Blossoms Shanghai**; Imperfect Victim; Like a Flowing River 3; A Long Way Home; Welcome to Milele Village; The Long Season; Always on the Move; The Forerunner; The Heart; War of Faith	**Xin Shuang – The Long Season**; Wong Kar-wai – Blossoms Shanghai; Yang Yang – Imperfect Victim; Yao Xiaofeng – War of Faith; Zheng Xiaolong and Liu Zhangmu – Always on the Move
Best Actor	Best Actress
**Hu Ge – Blossoms Shanghai**; Fan Wei – The Long Season; Ding Yongdai – Always on the Move; Wang Renjun – The Forerunner; Wang Yang – War of Faith	**Zhou Xun – Imperfect Victim**; Ren Suxi – There Will Be Ample Time; Tiffany Tang – Blossoms Shanghai; Yan Ni – Grandma's New World; Yang Zi – Lost You Forever
Best Supporting Actor	Best Supporting Actress
**Ning Li – Ripe Town**; Chen Minghao – The Long Season; Dong Yong – Blossoms Shanghai; Dong Zijian – Like a Flowing River 3; Liao Fan – Fearless Blood	**Jiang Yan – Always On the Move**; Joan Chen – The Heart; Fan Tiantian – Blossoms Shanghai; Ni Hongjie – Fake It Till You Make It; Song Jia – The Forerunner
Best Original Screenplay	Best Adapted Screenplay
**Gao Xuan and Ren Baoru – Imperfect Victim**; Gao Mantang and Li Zhou – Always On the Move; Liang Zhenhua, Hu Yating – Welcome to Milele Village; Yu Xiaoqian, Pan Yiran & Chen Ji – The Long Season; Zhao Dongling – A Long Way Home	**Qin Wen – Blossoms Shanghai**; Liu Cuihu, Lang Qunli & Li Tao – Fake It Till You Make It; Liu Fang, Li Huimin, Cheng Yu & Wang Wei – Mysterious Lotus Casebook; Lou Xiaopeng – Thirteen Years of Dust; Tong Hua & Wong Jing – Lost You Forever
Best Cinematography	Best Art Direction
**Peter Pau, Chen Cheng & Jin Chenyu – Blossoms Shanghai**; Li Bo – Endless Journey; Zhou Wencao – War of Faith; Ma Xiaobo – Spy Game; Li Xi – Thirteen Years of Dust	**Tu Nan – Blossoms Shanghai**; Zheng Chen – Lost You Forever; Shao Changyong & Zhu Hanbing – Like a Flowing River 3; Wu Jiakui – War of Faith; Wang Gang – Thirteen Years of Dust

=== Variety Program section ===
Best Variety Program
- **2024 Spring Festival Gala**
- **Divas Hit The Road Season 5·Silk Road**
  - 2023-2024 "Chinese Festivals" Series
  - A Green Trip
  - A Heart, for Chinese Painting
  - China Through lts Intangible Heritage
  - Chinese Practice with Chinese Wisdom
  - Infinity and Beyond: Family Carnival
  - Let's Reading
  - Irresistible Offer Season 5
  - The Big Band Season 3
  - The Legend of Grandmaster
  - Memories Beyond Horizon Season 2
  - Yellow River Cultural Conference Season 2
  - Become a Farmer Season 2

=== Foreign TV Series section ===
Best Foreign TV Series/Serial	Best Foreign TV Film/Miniseries
**Spinners (South Africa)**; Aspergirl (France); All Creatures Great and Small (United Kingdom); Succession (season 4) (United States); La storia (Italy)	**Sambre (France)**; Am Ende - Die Macht der Kränkung (Germany); Funny Woman (United Kingdom); In the Arms of the Tree (Iran); The Camorrist (Italy)

=== Documentary section ===
Best Documentary Series	Best Documentary
**China Before China (China)**; Shakespeare: Rise of a Genius (United Kingdom); Planet Earth III (United Kingdom); Arctic Ascent with Alex Honnold (United States); Shen Congwen with Xiangxi (China)	**Call Me Dancer (United States/Germany/Switzerland)**; Lynx Man (Finland); Story of a Golden Monkey King in Qinling Mountains of China (China); Such a Resounding Silence (Un silence si bruyant) (France); Van Gogh, the Making of a Master (Van Gogh, deux mois et une éternité) (France)

=== Animation section ===
Best Storytelling (Animation)	Best Animation
**Skip and Loafer (Japan)**; Biao Ren (China); Billy the Cowboy Hamster (United Kingdom); The Stories of Dunhuang (China); Frieren: Beyond Journey's End (Japan); Quentin Blake's Box of Treasures (United Kingdom/Belgium); Silly Sundays (Ireland); The Mirage House in the Clouds (China); The Sound Collector (United Kingdom/Italy); Star Wars: Young Jedi Adventures (United States)	**Quentin Blake's Box of Treasures (United Kingdom/Belgium)**; Skip and Loafer (Japan); Biao Ren (China); Billy the Cowboy Hamster (United Kingdom); The Stories of Dunhuang (China); Frieren: Beyond Journey's End (Japan); Silly Sundays (Ireland); The Mirage House in the Clouds (China); The Sound Collector (United Kingdom/Italy); Star Wars: Young Jedi Adventures (United States)

=== Special Award ===
International Communication Award (Animation)	International Communication Award (Documentary)
**Yao-Chinese Folktales (China)**	**Road to Carbon Neutrality (China)**
International Communication Award (TV Drama)	Shanghai TV Festival Special Award
**Three-Body (China)**	**A Road to Prosperity (China)**; **Chinese Practice with Chinese Wisdom (China)**
Jury Prize	Overseas Promotion Ambassador for Chinese TV Programs
**The Forerunner (Wondering the Vast) (China)**	**Liu Yifei**; **Chen Xiao**
