= 2024 Canneseries =

2024 television festival

2024 Cannes International Series Festival
- Location: Cannes, France
- Founded: 2018
- Awards: Best Series (The Zweiflers)
- Festival date: 5–10 April 2024
- Website: canneseries.com/en

Canneseries
- 2025 2023

The 7th Cannes International Series Festival is a television festival that took place from 5 to 10 April 2024 in Cannes, France.

The Best Series award went to German comedy drama The Zweiflers.

== Juries ==
The following juries were named for the festival.

=== Competition ===
- Sofie Gråbøl, Danish actress, Jury President
- Olivier Abbou, French screenwriter and director
- Amine Bouhafa, French composer
- Alice Braga, Brazilian actress
- Macarena García, Spanish actress
- Alix Poisson, French actress

=== Short Form Competition ===
- Henriette Steenstrup, Norwegian actress, Jury President
- Pénélope Bagieu, French illustrator
- Nathan Stewart-Jarrett, English actor

=== Documentary Competition ===
- Ovidie, French director and actress, Jury President
- Alex Boden, British film and television producer
- Julien Cernobori, French reporter and director

== Official selection ==
=== In competition ===
The following series were selected to compete:

Title	Original title	Creator(s)	Production countrie(s)	Network
Dark Horse		Sara Isabella Jønsson	Denmark	TV 2 Echo
Dumbsday	Dummedag	Marit Støre Valeur & Erlend Westnes & Christopher Pahle	Norway	NRK1
Living on a Razor's Edge	Betinho: No Fio da Navalha	José Junior	Brazil	Globoplay
Moresnet		Frank Van Passel & Jef Hoogmartens & Jonas Van Geel	Belgium, Netherlands, Germany	Streamz, ZDF
Operation Sabre	Sablja	Vladimir Tagić & Goran Stanković	Serbia, Bulgaria	RTS
This Is Not Sweden	Això no és Suècia	Aina Clotet & Valentina Viso & Dani González	Spain, Sweden, Germany, Finland	RTVE Play, TV3, SVT1, NDR, Yle
To the Wonder	我的阿勒泰	Yu Gong & Xiaohui Wang	China	iQIYI
The Zweiflers	Die Zweiflers	David Hadda	Germany	HR

=== Short Form Competition ===
Title	Original title	Creator(s)	Production countrie(s)	Network
How to Fail as a Popstar		Vivek Shraya	Canada	CBC Gem
La Terre appelle Mathilde		Anthony Coveney	Canada	TV5 Québec Canada, Unis
Money Shot	Toinen Tuleminen	Jemina Jokisalo	Finland	Elisa Viihde
Painkiller		Gabriela Pichler & Johan Lundborg	Sweden	SVT1
Rather Burn	Mejor Quemarse	Sebastián Tornamira & Laura Grandinetti	Argentina, Spain	UN3
Saint-Jean-du-Lac		Alexandre Pelletier & Emma-Jeanne Robitaille	Canada	Noovo, Crave
Swift Street		Tig Terera	Australia	SBS
Tarot	타로	DJ Lee	South Korea	LG U+ Mobile TV

=== Documentary Competition ===
Title	Original title	Creator(s)	Production countrie(s)	Network
Dale Undercover	Dale l'infiltré	David André	France	Canal+
DJ Mehdi: Made in France		Thibaut de Longeville	France	Arte
Hard to Swallow		Tunde Wey & Theo Schear	United States, Nigeria	—
Hidden	Niemand die het ziet	Mea Dols de Jong, Ester Gould & Reijer Zwaan	Netherlands	BNNVARA
Teenagers	Être ado	Ève Déziel	Canada	Télé-Québec

=== Out of competition ===
Title	Original title	Creator(s)	Production countrie(s)	Network
Becoming Karl Lagerfeld		Isaure Pisani-Ferry, Jennifer Have & Raphaëlle Bacqué	France	Disney+
Fallout		Lisa Joy & Jonathan Nolan	United States	Amazon Prime Video
Fiasco		Igor Gotesman & Pierre Niney	France	Netflix
Franklin		—	United States	Apple TV+
Máxima		—	Netherlands, Belgium, Spain, United States	Videoland
Terminal		Azedine Bendjilali, Giulio Callegari, Andréas Georgiou, Xavier Lacaille, Paul Mirabel & Angela Soupe	France	Canal+

== Awards ==
The following awards were presented at the festival:

- Best Series: The Zweiflers by David Hadda
- Best Screenplay: Christopher Pahle for Dumbsday
- Best Music: Marko Nyberg and Petja Virikko for The Zweiflers
- Best Performance: Aina Clotet for This Is Not Sweden
- Special Interpretation Award: Operation Sabre
- High School Award for Best Series: The Zweiflers by David Hadda
- Best Short Form Series: Rather Burn by Sebastián Tornamira and Laura Grandinetti
- Student Award for Best Short Form Series: Money Shot by Jemina Jokisalo
- Best Documentary: DJ Mehdi: Made in France by Thibaut de Longeville

=== Special awards ===
The following honorary awards are to be presented at the festival:

- Canal+ Icon Award: Kyle MacLachlan
- Madame Figaro Rising Star Award: Ella Purnell
- Konbini Commitment Award: Michaela Jaé Rodriguez
