= Li Juan =

Li Juan may refer to:

- Li Juan (volleyball)
- Li Juan (runner)
- Li Juan (author)
