= Just for Kicks =

Just for Kicks may refer to:

- Just for Kicks (2003 film), a comedy
- Just for Kicks (2005 film), a documentary about sneakers
- Just for Kicks (TV series), a 2006 American comedy-drama
