= To the Wonder (TV series) =

- Also known as: 我的阿勒泰
- Genre: Family, Love
- Created by: Teng Congcong; Peng Yi-ning
- Directed by: Teng Congcong
- Starring: Ma Yili; Zhou Yiran; Yu Shi
- Country of origin: China
- Original languages: Chinese; Uyghur; Kazakh
- No. of episodes: 8

Original release
- Network: CCTV-1; IQIYI
- Release: 7 May – 10 May 2024

To the Wonder (Chinese: 我的阿勒泰; pinyin: Wǒ de Ālètài; lit. 'My Altay') is a 2024 Chinese drama series, adapted from the chapter on pastoral marriage in contemporary Chinese writer Li Juan's essay collection My Altay (Chinese: 我的阿勒泰). Directed by Teng Congcong, who also wrote the screenplay with Peng Yining, the series stars Ma Yili, Zhou Yiran, and Yu Shi, with Jiang Qiming and Yan Peilun in special roles, and Huang Xiaojuan, Alimjan Tursenbek, Alima, and Hailati Hamu in major roles.

The series was selected for the Best Long Drama Competition at the 7th Cannes Series Festival in 2024, making it the first Chinese-language long drama to be nominated for this category. It was also screened at the 14th Beijing International Film Festival, with its Asian premiere held on April 25 in Beijing.

== Plot ==
Li Wenxiu (played by Zhou Yiran) is a Han Chinese girl who grew up in Altay, Xinjiang. At the age of 19, she went to Ürümqi to work. Though introverted, she has a passion for writing. Originally determined to pursue her literary dreams in the big city, she repeatedly encountered setbacks in her hotel job and was forced to return to her hometown, relying on her mother, Zhang Fengxia (played by Ma Yili), who runs a small shop. Upon returning home, she not only feels a deep sense of familiarity but also meets a cheerful Kazakh boy named Batay (played by Yu Shi). Through her life in the pastoral area, Wenxiu gradually discovers the beauty of the local landscape.

The show is based on Li Juan's 2010 memoir about her family's hardships in northern Xinjiang.

== Cast ==
- Ma Yili as Zhang Fengxia: she came to Xinjiang with the Production and Construction Corps in her youth. After her husband's death, Zhang Fengxia chose to open a small shop in an isolated area with no inhabitants within a hundred-mile radius.
- Zhou Yiran as Li Wenxiu: Zhang Fengxia's daughter, a Han Chinese girl who grew up in the Altay region. She has dreamed of becoming a writer since she was young.
- Yu Shi as Batay: a Kazakh boy full of natural vitality. He returns home in the summer to help his father with herding, riding horses across the vast prairie.
- Jiang Qiming as Gao Xiaoliang: a Guangdong native working hard in Xinjiang. He once worked with Li Wenxiu at the same restaurant in Ürümqi. Gao Xiaoliang came to Altay with friends to try his luck with jade gambling but was scammed out of all his cash. He fainted on the way and was rescued by Zhang Fengxia.
- Yan Peilun as Chao Ge: a border guard at the summer pasture, who has mutual feelings for Tuoken.
- Huang Xiaojuan as Grandma: Zhang Fengxia's mother-in-law and Li Wenxiu's grandmother, who has Alzheimer's disease.
- Alimjan Tursenbek as Sulitan: Batay's father, a herdsman.
- Alima as Tuoken: Sulitan's eldest daughter-in-law and Batay's sister-in-law. A year after her husband's death, Tuoken plans to remarry Chao Ge.
- Hailaiti Hamu as Aibek: the village chief.

== Production ==
The drama was funded by the National Radio and Television Administration's Network Audio-Visual Program Excellence Creation and Communication Project, as well as a key funding project by the Beijing Municipal Radio and Television Bureau. The Beijing Municipal Radio and Television Bureau served as the guiding unit, and it was co-produced by the Publicity Department of the Xinjiang Uygur Autonomous Regional Committee of the Chinese Communist Party.

== Release ==
On 7 May 2024, the series premiered simultaneously on China Central Television during prime time and on iQIYI's Weichen Drama Theater. The Kazakh-language dubbed version of the drama was broadcast on Kazakhstan's Channel 7 in June 2024.

== Reception ==
After its premiere on CCTV-1, the drama consistently topped the viewership ratings in its time slot. Within a week of its release, it had more than 100 million online viewers.

The Wall Street Journal characterized the show as a propaganda effort to soften Xinjiang's image among domestic audiences and promote tourism to the region among Han Chinese.

== Awards and nominations ==
Award	Year	Category	Nominee(s) / work(s)	Result	Ref.
Asia Contents Awards & Global OTT Awards	2024	Best Asian TV Series	To The Wonder	Nominated	
Asia Contents Awards & Global OTT Awards	2024	Best Writer	Teng Congcong, Peng Yining	Nominated	
Asian Academy Creative Awards	2024	Best Cinematography (Fiction)	Liu Yizeng	Won	
Asian Television Awards	2024	Best Drama Series	To The Wonder	Won	
Asian Television Awards	2024	Best Direction (Drama or Fiction)	Teng Congcong	Nominated	
Asian Television Awards	2024	Best Cinematography (Drama or Fiction)	Liu Yizeng	Nominated	
Shanghai Television Festival	2025	Best TV Series	To The Wonder	Won	
Shanghai Television Festival	2025	Best Director	Teng Congcong	Nominated	
Shanghai Television Festival	2025	Best Adapted Screenplay	Teng Congcong, Peng Yining	Nominated	
Shanghai Television Festival	2025	Best Actress	Ma Yili	Nominated	
Shanghai Television Festival	2025	Best Cinematography	Liu Yizeng	Won	
Shanghai Television Festival	2025	Best Art Direction	Li Jianing	Nominated	
Shanghai Television Festival	2025	International Communication Award (TV Drama)	To The Wonder	Won	
