= This Is Not Sweden =

- Created by: Aina Clotet; Valentina Viso; Dani González
- Based on: an original idea by Aina Clotet and Sergi Cameron
- Starring: Aina Clotet; Marcel Borràs
- Original languages: Catalan; Spanish; English; Swedish
- No. of seasons: 1
- No. of episodes: 8

Production
- Running time: c. 40 min
- Production companies: Nanouk Films; Funicular Films; Anagram Sweden

Original release
- Network: RTVE Play; TV3; SVT 1
- Release: 27 November 2023

This Is Not Sweden (Catalan: Això no és Suècia) is a Spanish–Swedish comedy-drama television series created by Aina Clotet, Valentina Viso, and Dani González from an original idea by Clotet and Sergi Cameron.

== Plot ==
Mariana and Samuel go to live in Vallvidrera, a mountain neighbourhood in Barcelona, to raise their children in a more authentic place, far from their respective painful childhoods. There they find a community of people with the same aspirations. But when a tragedy shakes the neighbourhood, they dismantle their ideal, the couple's certainties begin to waver and fear settles in, coming dangerously close to everything they were trying to run away from.

== Cast ==
- Aina Clotet as Mariana
- Marcel Borràs as Samuel
- Tomás del Estal
- Ia Langhammer
- Nora Navas
- Enric Auquer
- Mabel Rivera
- Nausicaa Bonnín
- Violeta Sanvisens

== Production and release ==
The series is a Nanouk Films, Funicular Films, and Anagram Sweden production, co-produced by RTVE, TV3, and SVT, together with NDR and Yle. The eight-episode season debuted on RTVE Play on 28 November 2023. TV3 aired the first episode of the series a day earlier, on 27 November 2023, and then broadcast the rest of the series on a weekly basis. The series premiered on SVT 1 in spring 2024.

== Accolades ==
| Year | Award | Category | Nominee(s) | Result | Ref. |
|---|---|---|---|---|---|
| 2023 | Prix Europa 2023 | Best European TV/Video Fiction Series of the Year | | Won | |
| 2024 | 11th Feroz Awards | Best Comedy Series | | Nominated | |
| 2024 | 7th Canneseries Festival | Best Actress | Aina Clotet | Won | |
| 2024 | 71st Ondas Awards | Best Comedy Series | | Won | |
