= Blossoms Shanghai =

2023 Chinese TV series by Wong Kar-wai

- Promotional poster
- Traditional Chinese: 繁花
- Simplified Chinese: 繁花
- Genre: Period drama Romance
- Based on: Blossoms by Jin Yucheng
- Written by: Qin Wen
- Directed by: Wong Kar-wai
- Starring: Hu Ge; Ma Yili; Tiffany Tang; Xin Zhilei
- Country of origin: China
- Original languages: Mandarin; Shanghainese
- No. of episodes: 30

Production
- Producer: Wong Kar-wai
- Production location: China
- Running time: 48 minutes
- Production companies: Jet Tone Production; Shanghai Tencent Penguin Film and Television Culture Communication Co., Ltd. Shanghai Film Group; China Central Television; Blossoms Island

Original release
- Network: CCTV-8; Tencent Video
- Release: December 27, 2023

Blossoms Shanghai (Chinese: 繁花; pinyin: Fán Huā; lit. 'Blossoms') is a Chinese drama television series directed and produced by Wong Kar-wai. It is adapted from the 2013 novel Blossoms written by Jin Yucheng. The series is set in Shanghai in the 1990s and stars Hu Ge, Ma Yili, Tiffany Tang, and Xin Zhilei. It is the first television series directed by Wong.

The 30-episode series started airing on CCTV-8 and Tencent Video on December 27, 2023. It was added to The Criterion Channel streaming service in 2025.

== Synopsis ==
The story is set in 1990s Shanghai and follows the journey of the protagonist Ah Bao as he rises from an ordinary young man to a prominent figure in the business world during the reform and opening up. Ah Bao's success is supported by several key figures, including Ye Shu, Ling Zi, the owner of Tokyo Nights, and Miss Wang from the foreign trade building. However, the arrival of the mysterious woman Li Li and the powerful Mr. Qiang from the Shenzhen stock market brings serious threats to his career, placing both his personal life and business in jeopardy.

== Cast ==
- Hu Ge as Ah Bao
- Ma Yili as Ling Zi
- Tiffany Tang as Miss Wang (Wang Mingzhu)
- Xin Zhilei as Li Li
- You Benchang as Ye Shu (Yaso in Shanghainese)
- Zheng Kai as Mr Wei
- Chen Long as Tao Tao
- Wu Yue as Jin Hua
- Papi Jiang as Ling Hong
- Dong Yong as Mr Fan
- Huang Jue as Mr Qiang
- Chen Guoqing as Teacher Ge
- Chloe Maayan as Min Min
- Du Juan as Xue Zhi
- Yumiko Cheng as Reporter
- Deric Wan as Wen Zhao Lun [Opening star]
- Evergreen Mak Cheung-ching as Boss Ma
- Kenny Bee as Golden Kitchen

== Production ==
=== Pre-production ===
In November 2013, director-producer Wong Kar-wai approached author Jin Yucheng to secure adaptation rights for Jin's novel Blossoms, which was published six months prior. Shanghainese scriptwriter Qin Wen was invited to the project in September 2017 given Wong and Jin's extensive research on the period drama adaptation. In March 2019, Wong Kar-wai revealed his plan on adapting Blossoms, by then an award-winning novel, at the Spring tea party of Hong Kong Screenwriters' Guild. At the tea party, he also said he had been preparing for 4 years and that the script would be completed soon. In addition, he indicated that the cast crew must speak Shanghainese. Han Zhijie, the vice president of Tencent Video, announced that the streaming service has nabbed rights to the series and that the preparations for Blossoms Shanghai have been completed and filming will start the next spring.

In March 2020, Wong Kar-Wai arrived in Shanghai to prepare for both TV series and film versions of Blossoms Shanghai. The production was originally scheduled to commence filming at Hengdian in July 2020, but Shanghai Film Group president Wang Jianer persuaded Wong to shift production back to Shanghai, promising to buy a filming base in the Songjiang district that Wong was interested in. They began to replicate scenes like Huanghe Road. The production team moved to Shanghai in August 2020. In total, Shanghai Film Group provided over 3,000 props, over 2,900 costumes, and built a 31,000-square-meter street area for filming.

On August 2, 2020, the series was officially announced at the 2020 Tencent Video annual conference, starring Hu Ge, with Shanghainese screenwriter, Qin Wen, cinematographer Peter Pau also attached to the series. On August 5, 2020, in order to recreate the period setting, the production company published a notice in the Shanghai newspaper Xinmin Evening News asking for old items from citizens related to 1990s' Shanghai. Hu Ge, Jin Yucheng, and Wong Kar-Wai shared their old sewing machine, wedding dress, and Shaoxing wine respectively as examples.

=== Casting ===
Wong Kar-wai met Hu Ge in 2017 to discuss the possible adaptation of the novel. Initially, Wong considered having Hu play all three main male characters—Lu Sheng, Ah Bao, and Xiao Mao—but later decided to focus on the storyline of Ah Bao. In 2019, casting agency CD Home Studio was engaged for the series, and Xin Zhilei was cast in the spring of that year. Actors from Shanghai Film Group, including Tiffany Tang and Chen Long, joined the crew after production shifted to the company's filming set in 2020. Hu Ge was officially announced as the male lead on August 2, 2020, at the 2020 Tencent Video annual conference. The three female leads—Ma Yili, Tiffany Tang, and Xin Zhilei—were confirmed on November 3, 2022, at the Zhejiang TV Fall investment conference. Additionally, on the same day, more cast members were announced, including You Benchang, Zheng Kai, Jonny Chen, Dong Yong, Huang Jue, Yang Haoyu, and Chloe Maayan. The majority of the main cast hails from Shanghai due to the requirement of speaking Shanghainese. Notably, over 20 alumni from the Shanghai Theatre Academy have been cast in the series.

=== Filming ===
CNS Newsreel about the filming of the series.

The filming officially began in Shanghai on September 10, 2020. The main scene "Huanghe Road" was rebuilt in 1:1 scale at Shanghai Film Park in Songjiang District, Shanghai.

A veteran stock market analyst was hired as the consultant to the production to provide historical context to the volatile re-opening of the Shanghai Stock Exchange in the 1990s, as well as to suggest and verify the terminology and financial accuracy to the various stock market plotlines in the story.

In October 2022, visual director Peter Pau revealed that Wong was creating each episode of the television series in film style with 50 minutes per episode, which made the filming take over 3 years. In January 2023, Wang Jianer, the secretary of the party committee and president of Shanghai Film Group, said the series will complete filming and broadcast in 2023.

=== Music ===
57 songs are used in this series, many of which were Mandopop and Cantopop songs popular in the 1990s. Total music copyright fees are estimated to be around CNY 10 million.

=== Post-production ===
In an interview with the Department of Cinematography of Beijing Film Academy, visual director Peter Pau revealed that all color grading LUTs in the show were created by him. During the post-production period, the team was tasked to edit thirty episodes in thirty days, and the entire project was outsourced to Thailand. Since Pau was attached to another movie, he was unable to dedicate full attention to post-production color correction. Pau expressed disappointment with the color grading at the first run of the series, which he believed does not capture the optimal tone. He believes the international version of the series will have better color grading and correction.

== Marketing ==
On June 7, 2021, the series released its first trailer, Time Is Like Water (Chinese: 时光如水), showing the flashing memories of Hu Ge's character Ah Bao. On November 3, 2022, the series released the second trailer, Blossoms Are Like Brocade (Chinese: 繁花似锦), which includes the debuts of three female leads and a sumptuous scene of Huanghe Road in old Shanghai.

== Release ==
The series started airing on CCTV-8 and streamed on Tencent Video on December 27, 2023.

In June 2025, Wong announced the series would stream in North America on the Criterion Channel. Mubi owns the international streaming rights for France, Germany, Italy, Switzerland, Austria, Belgium, the Netherlands, Luxembourg, Latin America, Turkey, and India. The series premiered on the Criterion Channel on November 24, 2025.

== Reception ==
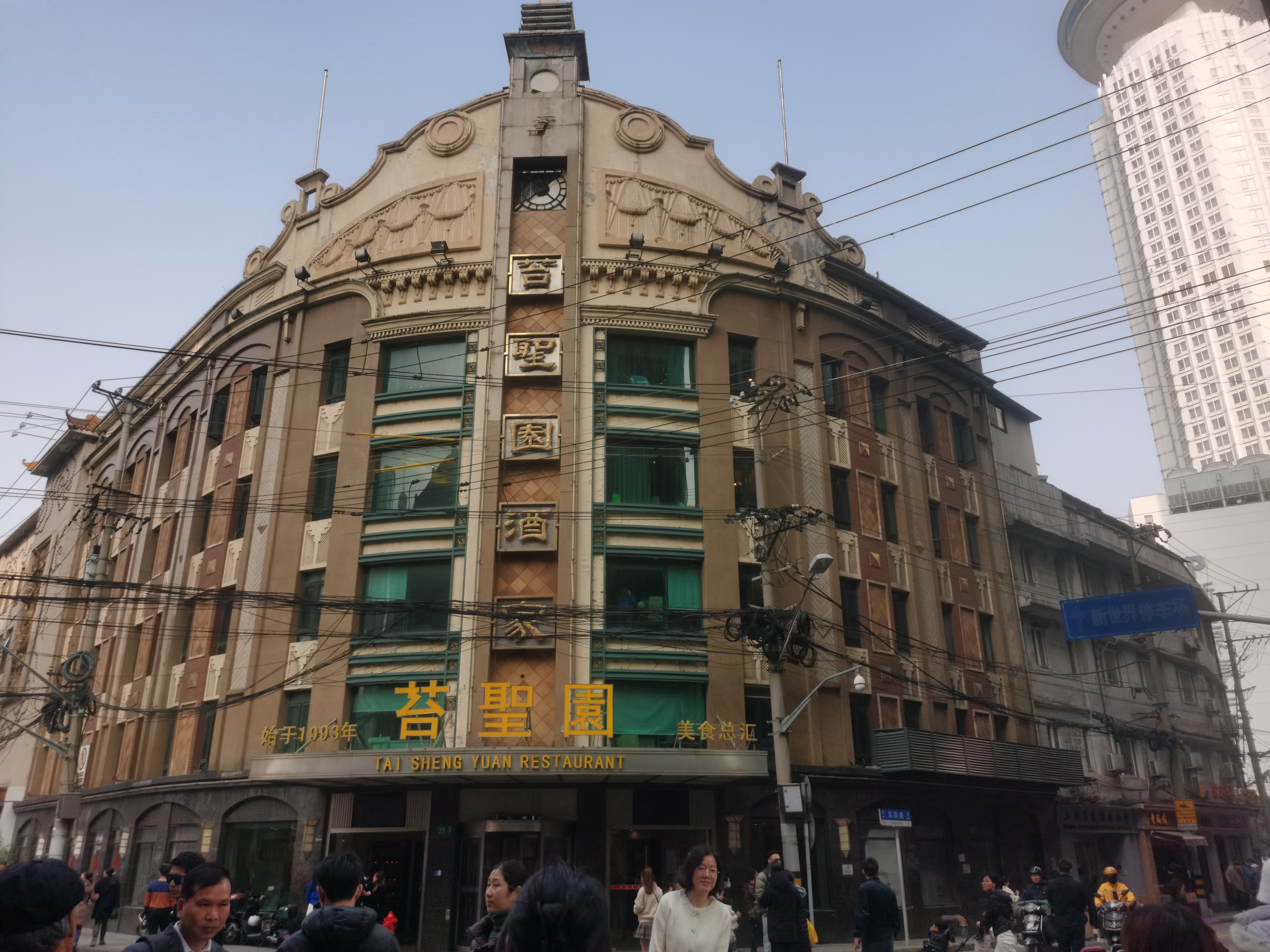
Taishengyuan Restaurant, which is the setting of Zhizhenyuan in the series, attracted many travelers after the series aired

Blossoms Shanghai was the most streamed television series nationwide when it aired between December 2023 and January 2024 on Tencent Video. The series also drew the most advertisements per episode among all dramas on streaming platforms at the time of airing, with an average of 10 advertisements per episode. The series also attracted numerous additional product placement ads from Rémy Martin, Estée Lauder, Pepsi, Bausch & Lomb, KFC, as well as tailor-made Giorgio Armani suits for actor Hu Ge, the brand's global ambassador.

Blossoms Shanghai sparked a feeling of nostalgia for many, bringing back memories of the 1990s, and the general mood of positivity and optimism in the early days of the reform and opening up. The series has also sparked the trend of Shanghainese of Wu Chinese, a dialect in decline since the push for Standard Mandarin in the 1950s.

Huanghe Road, one of the key locales featured in the series, has become a popular destination in Shanghai after the series aired. Tai Sheng Yuan Restaurant, the real-life inspiration for the fictional eatery Zhi Zhen Yuan that main character Ah Bao frequented, became a popular photo-taking spot. The Cathay Theater and Peace Hotel also attracted many travellers. In addition, some Shanghainese cuisine dishes showcased in the show were highly sought after by the public.

== Controversy ==
=== Broadcast controversy in Hong Kong ===
When Blossoms Shanghai began airing in Hong Kong, it became the subject of viewer complaints after Television Broadcasts Limited (TVB) arranged for the series to be broadcast on its Cantonese-language Jade Channel beginning 3 June 2024, with the main audio track in Mandarin and a secondary track in Shanghainese, but no Cantonese dubbing—a rare decision for a prime-time drama slot on the network. The arrangement drew criticism from Hong Kong viewers, who argued that TVB had disregarded the viewing habits of older local audiences and predicted that the move would hurt ratings. TVB stated that the audio setup was intended to preserve the work's "authenticity." However, local media later reported that director Wong Kar-wai had required the series not to undergo any "secondary creation," meaning no dubbing other than the original Shanghainese and the official Mandarin version. The explanation was met with further backlash from Hong Kong internet users, who accused both TVB and Wong of disrespecting local audiences and violating the Broadcasting Ordinance, which mandates that Chinese-language prime-time programming on free-to-air channels be broadcast in Cantonese. Commentators also argued that if "authenticity" was the goal, the Shanghainese version should have been the primary track, calling TVB's reasoning "unconvincing."

=== Screenwriting credit dispute and leaked audio recordings ===
Since 2022, prior to the drama's release, Cheng Junnian (程駿年), a graduate of the Central Academy of Drama, had published a series of articles under the pen name "Gu Er" (古二) on his WeChat account Gu Er New Talk, accusing the production team of Blossoms Shanghai of violating his labor and authorship rights. Cheng initially wrote in allegorical, surreal narratives without naming individuals, but following the drama's premiere, his name appeared in the end credits as "pre-production script editor." The next day, Cheng began publishing posts under his real name, claiming he had originally joined the project as both director and screenwriter but was later reassigned as director Wong Kar-wai's personal assistant with a salary of 3,000 RMB per month, responsible for food and logistics. He alleged that he had written scripts for Blossoms Shanghai for three years without a contract, remuneration, or formal credit, and further accused the production team of workplace bullying and exploitation. Cheng, who had been diagnosed with Kennedy disease before he joined the crew, claimed that when he asked Wong for permission to rest on set due to his muscular atrophy, Wong responded, "What do you want from me?"

Between late August and early September 2025, Cheng released multiple audio recordings of his discussions with credited screenwriter Qin Wen (秦雯), drawing attention online. On 20 September, Qin issued a statement through her lawyer announcing legal action against "those spreading distorted or infringing information," while the Blossoms Shanghai production team posted on Weibo that it "respects and supports the lawful rights of all creators," adding that "the extended end credits of the final episode are our tribute to over two thousand members of the production crew." On 23 September, the production team issued another statement, identifying Cheng as a member of the "pre-production research team" who "left the crew on 31 December 2020 without notifying the production and took away preparatory materials without authorization," asserting that "he was never one of the screenwriters of Blossoms Shanghai." On the same day, Cheng's WeChat account was blocked by Tencent, which is also one of the series' producers and its exclusive streaming platform, citing a complaint that the account had "violated the Provisions on the Administration of Internet User Public Account Information Services."

On October 31, 2025, Cheng released the second batch of audio recordings on social media, where Wong Kar-wai and Qin Wen made flippant or dismissive remarks about actors, including Chen Daoming and Tiffany Tang. In the recording, Qin mentioned that after she and Xu Siyao (许思窈), her ghostwriter, were detained for assaulting a police officer, Qin's husband Wang Guangli, co-director of Blossoms Shanghai, contacted a police acquaintance of Xu to secure their release from the police station. Qin was heard boasting that they got away within ten minutes without signing any legal documents. Qin also recounted that during the filming of My Best Friend's Story, where she was the credited screenwriter, her ghostwriter reassigned several of actress Liu Shishi's key lines from the original novel to Ni Ni's character, which upset Liu's team.

On November 1, Ni Ni's studio issued a statement denying any use of "connections" or "backing" during the production of My Best Friend's Story. On November 11, the Shanghai police confirmed that Qin and Xu had been stopped by police on March 29, 2019, for a traffic violation while cycling. Qin did not assault but "patted the officer on the back," which was not penalized. They concluded that Qin's account was made "in jest, merely to show off her connections."

On November 8, 2025, Cheng released a third batch of recordings. In them, Wong Kar-wai discussed plans to hold a summer camp to solicit scripts from young writers, while Xu Siyao mocked Chen Kun and Zhou Xun for running screenwriting workshops that had allegedly taken advantage of aspiring writers. Wong, along with Blossoms Shanghai co-director Li Shuang and producer Jacky Pang, was also heard discussing the Chinese Communist Party's handling of the COVID-19 outbreak. Li remarked that "the Party has no sentiment," while Wong said, "The Party only knows how to harvest," and, "Democratic countries don't do this… Only in this greedy one-party state would things become such a mess." The recordings were swiftly censored on Weibo. Cheng later uploaded them to X and YouTube. On the same day, the Blossoms Shanghai production team issued its third statement, accusing Cheng of releasing doctored materials out of personal grievance, smearing the creative team and peers, inciting online harassment and social division, and evading legal investigation by remaining overseas. The statement added that evidence of Cheng's alleged offenses had been submitted to the authorities.

On November 9, 2026, the Blossoms Shanghai production team said that a forensic audio assessment it had commisioned found that material in videos released under the name Gu Er had been fabricated or altered. The team cited repeated use of the same laughter, misaligned audio splices, and subtitles it said misrepresented the original dialogue.

In the same statement, the team said that a court had rejected Shanghai Blossoms Island Limited's claims against Cheng for alleged infringement of the company's reputation rights. The team said it had been unable to establish that the Weibo and Xiaohongshu accounts at issue belonged to Cheng.

On November 10, 2026, Yangtze Evening News reported that the WeChat Channels and Douyin accounts associated with Gu Er were deactivated by its owner.

== Accolades ==
Awards and nominations
Award	Year	Category	Nominee(s) / work(s)	Result	Ref.
Asia Contents Awards & Global OTT Awards	2024	Best Creative	Blossoms Shanghai	Won	
Asia Contents Awards & Global OTT Awards	2024	Best Lead Actor	Hu Ge	Won	
Asia Contents Awards & Global OTT Awards	2024	Best Supporting Actress	Du Juan	Nominated	
China TV Golden Eagle Awards	2024	Best Television Series	Blossoms Shanghai	Nominated	
China TV Golden Eagle Awards	2024	Best Screenwriter	Qin Wen	Nominated	
China TV Golden Eagle Awards	2024	Best Actor	Hu Ge	Nominated	
China TV Golden Eagle Awards	2024	Best Actress	Tiffany Tang	Nominated	
China TV Golden Eagle Awards	2024	Best Supporting Actor	Dong Yong	Nominated	
China TV Golden Eagle Awards	2024	Best Supporting Actress	Wu Yue	Nominated	
China TV Golden Eagle Awards	2024	Outstanding Television Series	Blossoms Shanghai	Won	
Shanghai Television Festival	2024	Best TV Series	Blossoms Shanghai	Won	
Shanghai Television Festival	2024	Best Adapted Screenplay	Qin Wen	Won	
Shanghai Television Festival	2024	Best Director	Wong Kar-wai	Nominated	
Shanghai Television Festival	2024	Best Actor	Hu Ge	Won	
Shanghai Television Festival	2024	Best Actress	Tiffany Tang	Nominated	
Shanghai Television Festival	2024	Best Supporting Actor	Dong Yong	Nominated	
Shanghai Television Festival	2024	Best Supporting Actress	Fan Tiantian	Nominated	
Shanghai Television Festival	2024	Best Cinematography	Peter Pau (HK, China), Chen Cheng, Jin Chenyu	Won	
Shanghai Television Festival	2024	Best Art Direction	Tu Nan	Won	
