= Skip and Loafer =

Japanese manga series

- First tankōbon volume cover, featuring Mitsumi Iwakura (left) and Sousuke Shima (right)

スキップとローファー (Sukippu to Rōfā)
- Genre: Coming-of-age; Romantic comedy; Slice of life
- Manga
- Written by: Misaki Takamatsu
- Published by: Kodansha
- English publisher: NA: Seven Seas Entertainment
- Imprint: Afternoon KC
- Magazine: Monthly Afternoon
- Original run: August 25, 2018 – present
- Volumes: 14
- Anime television series
- Directed by: Kotomi Deai
- Written by: Kotomi Deai; Yoko Yonaiyama (S2)
- Music by: Takatsugu Wakabayashi; Michiru (S2)
- Studio: P.A. Works
- Licensed by: Crunchyroll: SEA: Plus Media Networks Asia
- Original network: Tokyo MX, AT-X, HAB, BS Asahi, Kansai TV
- Original run: April 4, 2023 – present
- Episodes: 12
- icon

Skip and Loafer (Note: Transliteration of the original Japanese title. Takamatsu explained that skip (スキップ, Sukippu) refers to the characters' ambitiousness while loafers (ローファー, Rōfā) are worn with school uniforms.) (Japanese: スキップとローファー, Hepburn: Sukippu to Rōfā) is a Japanese manga series written and illustrated by Misaki Takamatsu. It has been serialized in Kodansha's seinen manga magazine Monthly Afternoon since August 2018. It has been licensed in North America for English release by Seven Seas Entertainment. An anime television series adaptation produced by P.A. Works aired from April to June 2023. A second season is set to premiere in April 2027.

Both the manga and anime adaptation have been well received by critics. By March 2024, the manga had over 2.3 million copies in circulation. In 2023, it won the 47th Kodansha Manga Award in the general category. The anime adaptation won the Best Storytelling Award at the 29th Shanghai Television Festival.

== Plot ==
Mitsumi Iwakura is a high school student who moved from the outskirts of Ishikawa Prefecture to high school in Tokyo after graduating from junior high school. Mitsumi grew up in a depopulated area, with only eight students in her class. However, on the day of her entrance ceremony, she gets caught in the commuter rush and gets lost. A tall, handsome boy worried about Mitsumi calls out to her and runs to school with her. He is a student of the same school and her classmate by chance.

== Characters ==
Mitsumi Iwakura (岩倉 美津未, Iwakura Mitsumi)
Voiced by: Tomoyo Kurosawa
First-year high school student who moved to Tokyo from the outskirts of Ishikawa Prefecture. She has bobbed hair and sanpaku eyes. Raised as a child prodigy, she entered high school at the top of her class; however, she has no athletic ability. Her pure personality unintentionally influences the people around her. She has a younger sister and brother.
Sousuke Shima (志摩 聡介, Shima Sōsuke)
Voiced by: Akinori Egoshi
Mitsumi's classmate who is handsome and popular with girls. He is known for sabotaging the entrance ceremony and skipping classes. Though he planned to skip the entrance ceremony, he meets Mitsumi and they run to school together. He was once a child actor that was caught up in a scandal, and has a strained relationship with his mother.
Mika Egashira (江頭 ミカ, Egashira Mika)
Voiced by: Yuka Terasaki
Mitsumi's classmate who only approached her after she found out Mitsumi was friends with Sousuke. Mitsumi's pure nature leads Mika to develop a real relationship with her.
Yuzuki "Yuzu" Murashige (村重 結月, Murashige Yuzuki)
Voiced by: Maaya Uchida
Mitsumi's classmate and her first friend in Tokyo. Her popularity in middle school due to her beauty made her wary of meeting new people. She studied abroad in her childhood so people assume she is good at English, but according to herself she is not that good at it.
Makoto Kurume (久留米 誠, Kurume Makoto)
Voiced by: Megumi Han
Mitsumi's classmate. She is introverted and worries about becoming isolated; she meets Mitsumi when she considered joining the student council to join some kind of community. Despite being wary of people like Yuzuki due to being bullied when she was younger, she meets Yuzuki through Mitsumi and they become close friends.
Nao (ナオ)
Voiced by: Mitsuki Saiga
Mitsumi's paternal aunt. She is a transgender woman and works as a stylist. Mitsumi's guardian since she moved to Tokyo.
Tsukasa Mukai (迎井 司, Mukai Tsukasa)
Voiced by: Hikaru Tanaka
Mitsumi's classmate and Sousuke's friend since middle school. He is quiet and kindhearted.
Kento Yamada (山田 健斗, Yamada Kento)
Voiced by: Ayumu Murase
Mitsumi's classmate and Sousuke's friend. He is the class clown who is loved, teased, and harmless to humans and animals; however, he is surprisingly diligent, making cookies for everyone in the class and supporting his classmates quietly.
Narumi Kanechika (兼近 鳴海, Kanechika Narumi)
Voiced by: Ryōhei Kimura
Second-year student and the next director of the drama club. He recruits Shima to the club. He becomes overly absorbed in theater and can lack delicacy in his actions but is also an honest person who cheers others up.
Tokiko Takamine (高嶺 十貴子, Takamine Tokiko)
Voiced by: Minami Tsuda
Second-year student council member. An extreme perfectionist who voluntarily follows a strict daily schedule. She had a stoic personality but became kinder upon meeting Mitsumi. She was a candidate for the next student council president, but lost to Kazakami due to her scary image, and became vice president.
Chieri Yasaka (八坂 千絵里, Yasaka Chieri)
Voiced by: Reina Ueda
Kiyohiko Ujiie (氏家清彦, Ujiie Kiyohiko)
Voiced by: Yuto Takenaka

== Production ==
Before working on Skip and Loafer, Misaki Takamatsu went through a difficult period of having submitted many storyboards to publishers, only to be constantly rejected. Looking for inspiration, Takamatsu read Ryōtarō Shiba's 1966 historical novel Sekigahara. The main characters in the novel, Mitsunari Ishida and Sakon Shima, along with their relationship were what inspired Skip and Loafer's main characters, Mitsumi Iwakura and Sousuke Shima, respectively. Takamatsu remarked that "Mitsunari is smart but clumsy and overconfident, and Sakon supports Mitsunari while thinking he can't help it. In fact, that is the basis of Mitsumi and Shima." Mitsumi being from a more rural area of Japan was based on Mitsunari being depicted as somewhat of an outsider in Sekigahara, as well as Takamatsu also being from the countryside, thus enhancing the contrast between Mitsumi and Sousuke, who lives in Tokyo.

Because the magazine Takamatsu was writing for, Monthly Afternoon, was in the seinen demographic, Takamatsu thought of coming up with a certain dramatic hook or theme for Skip and Loafer to fit in. Realizing doing so would make it uninteresting, she thought of making it like a shōjo manga instead, being "based on school life, with romance at the core but without a clear goal, and are viable even if other elements are not prominent." Her editor agreed, and the manga was approved for serialization without issue. Takamatsu admitted to taking elements of shōjo manga and reconstructing it with a greater focus on human relationships; for example, using character archetypes typical in that demographic, then adding more depth and personality to portray the "humanity beneath". She noted that working in a seinen magazine has enabled her much creative freedom to do so.

== Media ==
=== Manga ===
Written and illustrated by Misaki Takamatsu, Skip and Loafer has been serialized in Kodansha's seinen manga magazine Monthly Afternoon since August 25, 2018. Kodansha has collected its chapters, referred to as "scenes", into individual tankōbon volumes. The first volume was released on January 23, 2019. As of November 20, 2026, 14 volumes have been released.

In February 2021, Seven Seas Entertainment announced that they had licensed the manga for English release in North America. The first volume was released on August 10, 2021.

==== Volumes ====
No.	Original release date	Original ISBN	English release date	English ISBN
1	January 23, 2019	978-4-06-514209-7	August 10, 2021	978-1-63858-446-9 (digital); 978-1-64827-588-3 (print)
1. "Dun-da-DUNNN! A Sparkling-Fresh High Schooler" (ぴかぴかの高校生, Pikapika no Kōkōsei); 2. "Wooo... An Unsettling Karaoke Booth" (そわそわのカラオケボックス, Sowasowa no Karaokebokkusu); 3. "Uhhh... School Club Contention" (うろうろの部活動, Urōro no bu Katsudō); 4. "Mmm... A Dreamy Student Council" (フワフワの生徒会, Fuwafuwa no Seito-kai); 5. "Brzap! Electric Movie Theatre" (バチバチの映画館, Bachibachi no Eigakan)
2	July 23, 2019	978-4-06-516300-9	November 2, 2021 (digital); November 23, 2021 (print)	978-1-63858-447-6 (digital); 978-1-64827-621-7 (print)
6. "Tingly Friends" (ピリピリの友達, Piripiri no Tomodachi); 7. "Packed Schedules" (カツカツのスケジュール, Katsukatsu no Sukejūru); 8. "Prickly Personal Practice" (チクチクの個人練習, Chikuchiku no Kojin Renshū); 9. "Class Match Chaos" (いそいそのクラスマッチ, Isoiso no Kurasu Matchi); 10. "A Drizzly Start to the Rainy Season" (シトシトの梅雨入り, Shitoshito no Tsuyuiri); 11. "A Twinkling End to the Rainy Season" (チカチカの梅雨明け, Chikachika no Tsuyuake)
3	February 21, 2020	978-4-06-518471-4	February 8, 2022	978-1-68579-239-8 (digital); 978-1-63858-116-1 (print)
12. "The Presidential Election Shake-Up" (バタバタの生徒会長選挙, Batabata no Seito Kaichō Senkyo); 13. "Popularity Before Summer Break" (モテモテの夏休み前, Motemote no Natsuyasumi Mae); 14. "A Blistering-Hot Zoo" (ムワムワの動物園, Muwamuwa no Dōbutsuen); 15. "A Complicated Summer Break" (いろいろの夏休み, Iroiro no Natsuyasumi); 16. "A Drowsy Homecoming" (トロトロの帰省, Torotoro no Kisei); 17. "A Peppy End to Summer Break" (ルンルンの夏休み明け, Runrun no Natsuyasumi-ake)
4	August 21, 2020	978-4-06-520539-6	April 19, 2022	978-1-68579-240-4 (digital); 978-1-63858-203-8 (print)
18. "Scramble! Preparing for the Festival" (バタバタの文化祭準備, Batabata no Bunkamatsuri Junbi); 19. "Plip, drip... A Tearstained Dance" (ポロポロのダンス, Poroporo no Dansu); 20. "Woo-hoo! An Animated Festival (1)" (ワイワイの文化祭 (1), Waiwai no Bunkamatsuri (1)); 21. "Woo-hoo! An Animated Festival (2)" (ワイワイの文化祭 (2), Waiwai no Bunkamatsuri (2)); 22. "Woo-hoo! An Animated Festival (3)" (ワイワイの文化祭 (3), Waiwai no Bunkamatsuri (3)); 23. "Woo-hoo! An Animated Festival (4)" (ワイワイの文化祭 (4), Waiwai no Bunkamatsuri (4))
5	March 23, 2021	978-4-06-522497-7	July 26, 2022 (digital); July 19, 2022 (print)	978-1-68579-786-7 (digital); 978-1-63858-371-4 (print)
24. "Fidgety Adolescence" (モジモジの思春期, Mojimoji no Shishunki); 25. "Head-Spinning First Love" (ぐるぐるの初恋?, Huruguru no Katsukoi?); 26. "Smarting Girl (1)" (ズキズキの女の子 (1), Zukizuki no On'nanoko (1)); 27. "Smarting Girl (2)" (ズキズキの女の子 (2), Zukizuki no On'nanoko (2)); 28. "Jingling Christmas" (シャンシャンのクリスマス, Shanshan no Kurisumasu); 29. "Tranquil New Year" (しんしんの年末年始, Shinshin no Nenmatsunenshi)
6	November 22, 2021	978-4-06-525779-1	November 29, 2022	978-1-68579-985-4 (digital); 978-1-63858-789-7 (print)
30. "A Heart-Thumping Valentine's (1)" (バクバクのバレンタイン (1), Bakubaku no Barentain (1)); 31. "A Heart-Thumping Valentine's (2)" (バクバクのバレンタイン (2), Bakubaku no Barentain (2)); 32. "Snippity-Snip Sweet Sixteen" (チョキチョキの16歳, Chokichoki no Jū-roku-sai); 33. "Happy-Go-Lucky Cake" (ニコニコのケーキ, Nikoniko no Kēki); 34. "Ambitions in Romance" (ラブラブの野望, Raburabu no Yabō); 35. "Tippity-Tapping into a New School Year" (パタパタの進級, Patapata no Shinkyū)
7	June 22, 2022	978-4-06-528147-5	May 9, 2023	979-8-88843-571-7 (digital); 978-1-68579-495-8 (print)
36. "A Glimmering Second-Year Student" (テカテカの2年生, Tekateka no Ni-nensei); 37. "Smug Senpai" (ドヤドヤの後輩, Doyadoya no Kōhai); 38. "Boggy New Class" (じくじくの新クラス, Jikujiku no Shin Kurasu); 39. "Meandering Way Home" (うだうだの帰り道, Udauda no Kaerimichi); 40. "Tromping up the Mountain" (ザクザクの登山, Zakuzaku no Tozan); 41. "A Light and Airy Spring" (ふわふわの春, Fuwafuwa no Haru)
8	January 23, 2023	978-4-06-530267-5	October 24, 2023	979-8-89160-162-8 (digital); 979-8-88843-031-6 (print)
42. "Flustered Dating" (ドギマギのお付き合い?, Dogimagi no o Tsukiai?); 43. "Mismatched Affections" (ちぐはぐの気持ち, Chiguhagu no Kimochi); 44. "Jumbled Emotions" (くしゃくしゃの心, Kushakusha no Kokoro); 45. "Presidential Pandemonium" (ザワザワの新生徒会長, Zawazawa no Shin Seito Kaichō); 46. "Heartfelt Picnic" (ぽかぽかのピクニック, Pokapoka no Pikunikku); 47. "Pitter-Pattering Raindrops" (ぱらぱらの雨, Parapara no Ame)
9	August 23, 2023	978-4-06-532642-8	May 21, 2024	979-8-89373-093-7 (digital); 979-8-88843-769-8 (print)
48. "Tumbling One-Sided Crush" (コロコロの片想い, Korokoro no Kataomoi); 49. "Giddy Vacation Plans" (ワクワクの旅行計画, Wakuwaku no Ryokō Keikaku); 50. "Bumbling Stumbling School Day" (ギクシャクの登校日, Gikushaku no Tōkō-bi); 51. "Heart-Throbbing Ocean (1)" (ドキドキの海, Dokidoki no Umi); 52. "Heart-Throbbing Ocean (2)" (ドキドキの海 (2), Dokidoki no Umi (2)); 53. "Heart-Throbbing Ocean (3)" (ドキドキの海 (3), Dokidoki no Umi (3))
10	March 22, 2024	978-4-06-534851-2; 978-4-06-535630-2 (SE) (Note: All proceeds were donated to relief efforts for the 2024 Noto earthquake.)	October 22, 2024	979-8-89561-030-5 (digital); 979-8-89160-658-6 (print)
54. "Heart-Throbbing Ocean (4)" (ドキドキの海 (4), Dokidoki no Umi (4)); 55. "Heart-Throbbing Ocean (5)" (ドキドキの海 (5), Dokidoki no Umi (5)); 56. "Exhausting Road Home" (くたくたの帰路, Kutakuta no Kiro); 57. "Eye-Opening School Day" (ほくほくの登校日, Hokuhoku no Tōkō-bi); 58. "Dazzling Career Path (1)" (ギラギラの進路, Giragira no Shinro); 59. "Dazzling Career Path (2)" (ギラギラの進路 (2), Giragira no Shinro (2))
11	December 23, 2024	978-4-06-537722-2	September 2, 2025	979-8-89765-692-9 (digital); 979-8-89373-291-7 (print)
60. "Mumbled Words" (モニョモニョの発言, Monyomonyo no Hatsugen); 61. "Infuriating Competition" (ムカムカの地区大会, Mukamuka no Chiku Taikai); 62. "Snuggly Shopping" (ぎゅっのお買い物, Gyunno o Kaimono); 63. "Tippy-Tappy Class Trip (1)" (てくてくの修学旅行, Tekuteku no Shūgakuryokō); 64. "Tippy-Tappy Class Trip (2)" (てくてくの修学旅行 (2), Tekuteku no Shūgakuryokō (2)); 65. "Tippy-Tappy Class Trip (3)" (てくてくの修学旅行 (3), Tekuteku no Shūgakuryokō (3))
12	August 22, 2025	978-4-06-539706-0	July 7, 2026	979-8-90209-625-2 (digital); 979-8-89765-361-4 (print)
66. "Tippy-Tappy Class Trip (4)" (てくてくの修学旅行 (4), Tekuteku no Shūgakuryokō (4)); 67. "Rough and Scratchy Memories" (ザラザラの記憶, Zarazara no Kioku); 68. "Flickering Stage" (チカチカの舞台, Chikachika no Butai); 69. "Wibbly-Wobbly Family Trip" (ふらふらの家族旅行, Furafura no Kazoku Ryokō); 70. "Hustling Bustling School Festival (1)" (わたわたの文化祭, Watawata no Bunkamatsuri); 71. "Hustling Bustling School Festival (2)" (わたわたの文化祭 (2), Watawata no Bunkamatsuri (2)); 72. "Hustling Bustling School Festival (3)" (わたわたの文化祭 (3), Watawata no Bunkamatsuri (3))
13	April 23, 2026	978-4-06-543201-3	March 16, 2027	979-8-89863-236-6 (print)
73. "Hustling Bustling School Festival (4)" (わたわたの文化祭 (4), Watawata no Bunkamatsuri (4)); 74. Kyakkya no Uchiage (キャッキャの打ち上げ); 75. Shakishaki no Biyōin (シャキシャキの美容院); 76. Guragura no Yorimichi (ぐらぐらの寄り道); 77. Monmon no Ibu (もんもんのイブ); 78. Wafuwafu no Hatsumōde (はふはふの初詣)
14	November 20, 2026	978-4-06-545674-3	—	—
79. Urara no Sōshun (うららの早春); 80. Haa no Shitsuren (ハァ~の失恋); 81. Meromero no Ano Ko (メロメロのあの子); 82. Nonbiri no Haruyasumi (のんびりの春休み); 83. Pukapuka no Tomodachi (プカプカの友達); 84. Sarasara no Saishū Gakunen (さらさらの最終学年)

=== Anime ===
In November 2021, it was announced that the series would receive an anime television series adaptation. It was animated by P.A. Works and directed by Kotomi Deai, who also handled the series composition, with character designs handled by Manami Umeshita, who also served as chief animation director, and music composed by Takatsugu Wakabayashi. The series aired from April 4 to June 20, 2023, on Tokyo MX and other networks. The opening theme is "Mellow" (メロウ, Merō), performed by Keina Suda, while the ending theme is "Hanauta to Mawari Michi" (ハナウタとまわり道; 'Humming and Detour'), performed by Rikako Aida.

In December 2024, it was announced that the series will receive a second season. The main staff members from the first season are reprising their roles, with Yoko Yonaiyama joining Daichi to handle the series composition, and Michiru joining Wakabayashi to compose the music. It is set to premiere in April 2027.

Crunchyroll licensed the series for streaming. Plus Media Networks Asia licensed the series in Southeast Asia, and premiered on Aniplus Asia.

==== Episodes ====
No.	Title	Directed by	Written by	Storyboarded by	Original release date
1	"Sparkling-Fresh"; Transliteration: "Pikapika" (Japanese: ピカピカ)	Kotomi Deai	Yōko Yonaiyama	Kotomi Deai	April 4, 2023
On the first day of high school, Mitsumi gets lost on her way to school in the Tokyo commuter rush. Shima, enrolled in the same school, happens upon her and accompanies her. Mitsumi ends up running barefoot to make it to the entrance ceremony late but just in time for her ceremonial address as the representative for the first-years. Despite forgetting to have the script with her, she successfully gives the entire speech from memory, then proceeds to throw up on her homeroom teacher out of nervousness and exhaustion. Mitsumi finds out she is in the same class as Shima, who asks to be friends.
2	"Fidgeting and Wandering"; Transliteration: "Sowasowa Urouro" (Japanese: そわそわ うろうろ)	Yuriko Abe	Tomoko Shinozuka	Yuriko Abe	April 11, 2023
During her self-introduction to the class, Mitsumi tells a joke about her ambition which lands awkwardly. Mitsumi and Shima are voted in together as class representatives. At a karaoke party with classmates, Yuzuki points out to Mitsumi Mika is using her to get closer to Shima. Encouraged by her childhood friend Fumi over the phone, Mitsumi rejoins the group and sings a children's song, to everyone's amusement. Mitsumi attends the drama club's performance as she contemplates which school club to join. When asked for advice, Shima tells Mitsumi not to concern herself too much about what decision to make. Kanechika, the drama club's president, recognizes Shima as a child actor from some years ago, but Shima curtly tells him to drop the topic.
3	"Dreamy and Sparky"; Transliteration: "Fuwafuwa Bachibachi" (Japanese: フワフワ バチバチ)	Akira Takamura	Katsurō Hidaka	Jong Heo	April 18, 2023
Mitsumi meets Makoto when she visits the student council to inquire about joining. After the meeting, Mitsumi is encouraged by Shima to invite Makoto to hang out together at a cafe. Makoto invites Mitsumi to the movies, which becomes a group event when other classmates join in. Makoto becomes uncomfortable with a friendly Yuzuki, who she perceives as a type of person she dislikes. However, Makoto's attitude begins to soften thanks to Mitsumi's attempts to bond with both of them over popcorn.
4	"Tingling and Scraping"; Transliteration: "Piripiri Katsukatsu" (Japanese: ピリピリ カツカツ)	Ken Sanuma	Tomoko Shinozuka	Ken Sanuma	April 25, 2023
Kanechika asks Mitsumi to help him recruit Shima into the drama club, which makes her anxious throughout the day. Shima and Mitsumi talk about his past goal of pleasing his mom through his acting and her future goal of entering public service to help her hometown. They promise to support each other going forward. Mitsumi becomes worried about her time management, so she starts to shadow Takamine, a senior in the student council who follows a packed, detailed schedule. While on an errand, Mitsumi and Takamine end up missing the bus and fall behind schedule. Takamine is initially upset, but she notices Mitsumi enjoying the experience and taking in the sights. Takamine and Shima advise Mitsumi to find a style that works best for her.
5	"Prickly and Giddy"; Transliteration: "Chikuchiku Isoiso" (Japanese: チクチク いそいそ)	Yōhei Fukui	Katsurō Hidaka	Norihiro Naganuma	May 2, 2023
Mitsumi signs up for volleyball in the upcoming class matches. Being unathletic, she asks a reluctant Mika to give her lessons. During the practice sessions, Mika notices Mitsumi standing up to some abrasive seniors and appreciating the people who help her. Mika learns Mitsumi asked her specifically because she considers Mika a harsh but honest hard-working person. On the day of the class match, Mitsumi's volleyball team wins the first few matches. The girls head over to the boys' basketball match, and Mitsumi is too embarrassed to approach Shima in front of so many cheering girls. When Kanechika observes Shima may be feeling lonely despite being popular, Mitsumi recalls how Shima approached her and became her friend. She returns to the match and gives Shima some pickled vegetables she made.
6	"Drizzling and Flickering"; Transliteration: "Shitoshito Chikachika" (Japanese: シトシト チカチカ)	Tomoko Hiramuki	Yōko Yonaiyama	Toshiya Shinohara	May 9, 2023
Fumi tells Mitsumi she likes a boy. Mitsumi becomes concerned when Shima misses school because he slept in. Additionally, she hears about how he has occasionally skipped school before, amongst other rumors of his delinquency. When she confronts him the next day, he responds dismissively, leaving her flustered. Mitsumi and Shima each feels bad about the conversation. Mitsumi decides to make up with Shima and confesses she was not having any fun at school without him. Shima clears up the rumors by explaining his complicated situation at home. Shima comments to Mitsumi this is first time he has been real friends with a girl, as Mitsumi starts to recall what Fumi said about love.
7	"Hectic and Hot Stuff"; Transliteration: "Patapata Motemote" (Japanese: パタパタ モテモテ)	Mitsuyo Yokono	Katsurō Hidaka	Yuriko Abe	May 16, 2023
Mitsumi is appointed as student council secretary, while an upset Takamine becomes vice-president after losing the election to a popular last-minute challenger. Kanechika learns about what happened and screens an embarrassing movie he made as a child. Takamine comes to terms with her election loss and offers to work together with the new president. As summer vacation approaches, Shima turns down several girls who confess to him. Mitsumi asks Shima on a whim to go to the zoo together, and she is shocked when he accepts. Later, Ririka, a famous model and Shima's childhood friend, visits the school out of the blue to see Shima.
8	"Heat and Complications"; Transliteration: "Muwamuwa Iroiro" (Japanese: ムワムワ いろいろ)	Chie Yamashiro	Yōko Yonaiyama	Chie Yamashiro	May 23, 2023
Mitsumi and Shima visit the zoo together. Mitsumi's Aunt Nao and Mika, who both found out about the "date", are tailing them, end up running into each other. Mitsumi and Shima cut the visit short because of the hot weather. Mitsumi shops for gifts for her family and encourages Shima to buy one for his little brother. Nao and Mika decide to stop following them once they realize Shima is a genuine friend to Mitsumi. Yuzuki, Makoto and Mika come over to Mitsumi's for a sleepover. Yuzuki shares she did not get along well with friends in middle school but is thoroughly enjoying high school. Mika tries to leave early with an excuse, but Nao sees through the lie. Mika rejoins her friends with Nao's encouragement. Ririka calls Shima over and reminds him he was responsible for her career ending as a child actor.
9	"Drowsy and Peppy"; Transliteration: "Torotoro Runrun" (Japanese: トロトロ ルンルン)	Shū Honma	Katsurō Hidaka	Shū Honma	May 30, 2023
Mitsumi visits returns home for the summer and relaxes with her family and her good friends. Mitsumi returns to school after the break and reunites with the girls, but she feels a little distant from Shima. As a student council member, Mitsumi becomes busy with preparations for the school cultural festival. She finds Shima in low spirits and gives him crackers she brought from her hometown.
10	"Scrambling and Dripping"; Transliteration: "Batabata Poroporo" (Japanese: バタバタ ポロポロ)	Takanori Yano	Yōko Yonaiyama	Katsumi Terahigashi	June 6, 2023
Mitsumi's class decides to put on a stage play for the cultural festival. Shima feels uncomfortable about acting, but agrees to it when asked. Mitsumi is too busy with the student council work to participate, but she eagerly agrees to help. Shima worries whether Mitsumi is taking on too much. Mitsumi falls asleep while working and fails to review the script as promised. Mitsumi overhears her classmates complaining about her. When Shima tries to cheer her up, Mitsumi breaks down crying because she in turn realizes she has not been looking out for her friend. Shima begins performing his song and dance in front of Mitsumi, and she joins in. As she starts feeling better, she comes up with suggestions to improve the play for her classmates.
11	"Hype and Excitement"; Transliteration: "Waiwai Zawazawa" (Japanese: ワイワイ ザワザワ)	Yuriko Abe	Katsurō Hidaka	Yuriko Abe	June 13, 2023
The school cultural festival begins, and everyone is busy with the events. Mitsumi meets the visiting middle school friends of her friends and reflects on her friendships. When a lost three-year-old Keiri manages to reach Shima's classroom, Mitsumi realizes he is Shima's little brother. The class scrambles to find Shima and his mom. Keiri cries from relief when Shima shows up, while Mitsumi finds Shima's mom.
12	"Shining"; Transliteration: "Kirakira" (Japanese: キラキラ)	Kotomi Deai	Yōko Yonaiyama	Kotomi Deai	June 20, 2023
Mitsumi and Shima's mom run into Ririka and Chris, a childhood friend of Shima's. Ririka accuses Shima's mom of forcing Shima to act again. When the group arrives at the classroom, Shima's mom takes Keiri home without watching the play, while the class finds out about Shima's child actor career. Mitsumi tries to separate Ririka and Shima by physically jumping in between the two during Ririka guilt-tripping of Shima. During the last performance, Shima contemplates his own feelings and what he wants. After the performance, Shima expresses to Ririka his desire to move on from the past and enjoy his high school life. Ririka storms out upset, and Chris tells her Shima will still stay friends with her. The cultural festivals end with a huge success. As everyone cleans up and heads home, Mitsumi is happy to see Shima is acting differently than usual.

=== Musical ===
In September 2025, a musical adaptation of the manga was announced and was set to run in March 2026 in Tokyo and Osaka. Ako Takahashi wrote the script and lyrics, Tetsuharu directed the musical and choreography, and Shū Kanematsu composed the music. The cast included Miisha Shimizu as Mitsumi Iwakura, and Sion Yoshitaka as Sousuke Shima. It ran on March 6–15, 2026 at the Theater H in Tokyo, and on March 20–22 at the Umeda Arts Theater in Osaka. The March 14 performance was live streamed, with a Blu-ray disc released on July 22.

== Reception ==
=== Manga ===
By January 2023, the Skip and Loafer manga had over 1 million copies in circulation. By March 2024, it had over 2.3 million copies in circulation.

Alongside Ranking of Kings, Skip and Loafer ranked seventh on Takarajimasha's Kono Manga ga Sugoi! list of best manga of 2020 for male readers; it ranked eighth on the 2024 edition. The series ranked 46th on the 2021 "Book of the Year" list by Da Vinci magazine; it ranked ninth on the 2023 list. In 2020, the series was nominated for the 13th Manga Taishō and placed third with 58 points. It was nominated for the 44th Kodansha Manga Award in the general category in 2020; it was nominated for the 46th edition in the same category in 2022; it won the 47th edition in the same category in 2023. The manga was one of the Jury Recommended Works at the 23rd Japan Media Arts Festival in 2020. It was one of the Jury Recommended Works for the French 17th ACBD's Prix Asie de la Critique 2023.

Rebecca Silverman of Anime News Network gave the first two volumes an A−. Silverman wrote: "Skip and Loafer may not have fabulous art and it may not have an innovative story. But it does have a firm grasp of its storytelling and characters and a not inconsiderable sense of humor. It's light without being frothy and real without being a drag, and if you're looking for a story that verges on the humorous slice-of-life genre, I can't recommend this enough. Treats characters like individual people, balances humor and seriousness well".

=== Anime ===
The anime adaptation won the Golden Dragon Award for Overseas Animation at the 20th China Animation & Comic Competition in 2023. The series was nominated in the Best Romance and Best Slice of Life categories at the 8th Crunchyroll Anime Awards in 2024. It also won the Magnolia Award for Best Storytelling, while it was nominated for Best Animation at the 29th Shanghai Television Festival.

The anime series was received positively. Alex Henderson of Anime Feminist reviewed the first episode, calling it "cute as a button", with naturalistic animation and well-done backdrops, with a female protagonist who is "endearing", said there is still room for the show to "wobble", and argued that the episode was "thoroughly charming".
