= Send Me to the Clouds =

- Film poster
- Traditional Chinese: 送我上青雲
- Simplified Chinese: 送我上青云
- Literal meaning: send me to blue clouds
- Hanyu Pinyin: sòng wǒ shàng qīngyún
- Directed by: Teng Congcong
- Written by: Teng Congcong
- Produced by: Dun Hei; Zhang Lei
- Starring: Yao Chen; Justin Yuan
- Cinematography: Jong Lin
- Music by: Wen Zi
- Distributed by: Cheng Cheng Films
- Release dates: 17 June 2019 (22nd Shanghai International Film Festival); 16 August 2019 (China)
- Running time: 99 minutes
- Country: China
- Language: Mandarin

Send Me to the Clouds (Chinese: 送我上青云) is a 2019 Chinese drama film directed and written by Teng Congcong, and starring Yao Chen, Justin Yuan and Li Jiuxiao. It was screened at the 22nd Shanghai International Film Festival. The film had four nominations and won Best Supporting Actress award for Wu Yufang at the 32nd Golden Rooster Awards.

== Plot ==
Sheng Nan, a single woman over the age of 30, learns that she has ovarian cancer. She decides to find a new job to raise money for surgery and to explore sexual experiences before the illness makes such encounters impossible. She finds work ghostwriting the biography of an elderly and flirtatious millionaire, while trying to start a relationship with a single man closer to her own age.

== Cast ==
- Yao Chen as Sheng Nan
- Justin Yuan as Liu Guangming
- Li Jiuxiao as Mao Cui
- Liang Guanhua as Li Ping
- Yang Xinming as Lao Li
- Wu Yufang as Liang Meizhi
- Shi Qiang as Sheng Nan's father

== Production ==
Beginning in 2013, Teng spent four years writing the screenplay for the film. She spent hours shadowing journalists to learn more about their work in order to properly write the role of Sheng Nan. Yao Chen joined the film as Sheng Nan after one of the film's producers, Dun He, passed the script to her. Yao Chen enjoyed the role so much that she also asked to serve as the producer of the project. In an interview with Baidu, Teng stated that, "Yao Chen is someone who values the script above all else. We are both very open and sincere, and we have a great chemistry. We both want to create a good work, and that sincerity is evident in our words."

== Reception ==
=== Box office ===
Made on a budget of USD $1.4 million (RMB 10 million), the film grossed USD $4.3 million (RMB 29.5 million) at the box office.

=== Critical response ===
Critical response to the film was largely positive. On the review aggregator website Rotten Tomatoes, 90% of 10 critics' reviews are positive.

Richard Kuipers from Variety described how the film addresses the unique perspectives of unmarried women that have been categorized as "leftover women" in Chinese society, and stated that "the film’s most powerful message...is that women should be able to seek sex without shame." Hollywood Reporter writer Elizabeth Kerr stated that, "Send Me to the Clouds doesn’t go out of its way to be overly confrontational, but the combination of Yao-approved female independence, a portrait of defiance and frank acknowledgement of things like ovaries make it something of a cinematic roar — and universal despite its geographic specificity."

=== Accolades ===
Send Me to the Clouds was nominated and won various film festival awards. Most notably, Wu Yufang won a Golden Rooster Award for Best Supporting Actress in 2019 for her role as Liang Meizhi. Chen Yao was nominated for the Golden Rooster Award for Best Actress for her role as Sheng Nan, while Teng Congcong was nominated for Golden Rooster Award for Best Directorial Debut and Best Screenplay.
