= Blades of the Guardians =

2026 Chinese-Hong Kong film by Yuen Woo-ping

- Theatrical release poster

Chinese name
- Traditional Chinese: 鏢人：風起大漠
- Simplified Chinese: 镖人：风起大漠
Transcriptions
Standard Mandarin
- Hanyu Pinyin: Biāo Rén：Fēng Qǐ Dàmò
Yue: Cantonese
- Jyutping: Biu^{1} Jan^{4} Fung^{1} Hei^{2} Daai^{6} Mok^{6}
- Directed by: Yuen Woo-ping
- Screenplay by: Su Chao-Bin; Larry Yang
- Based on: Biao Ren by Xu Xianzhe
- Produced by: Wu Jing; Yu Baimei; Allison Lok Kam Yuen
- Starring: Wu Jing; Nicholas Tse; Yu Shi; Jet Li
- Cinematography: Tony Cheung Tung-Leung; Peter Pau
- Music by: William Wu; Yu Muye
- Production companies: Beijing Damai Entertainment; Beijing Dengfeng International Culture Communications Company; Woo Ping Pictures; Mengqi Film; Eagle Media; Amazing Box; Huaxia Film; China Film Group
- Distributed by: Beijing Dengfeng International Culture Communications Company (China); Beijing Super Lion Culture Group (China); Mandarin Motion Pictures (Hong Kong)
- Release date: 17 February 2026
- Running time: 126 minutes
- Countries: China; Hong Kong
- Language: Mandarin
- Budget: US$100–123 million (¥700–850 million)
- Box office: US$214.44 million (domestic gross)

Blades of the Guardians (simplified Chinese: 镖人：风起大漠; traditional Chinese: 鏢人：風起大漠; lit. 'Armed Escorts: Wind Rises in the Great Desert') is a 2026 epic wuxia film directed by Yuen Woo-ping, based on the manhua Biao Ren. Produced by Damai Entertainment in association with Beijing Dengfeng International Culture Communications Company and Woo Ping Pictures, the film stars Wu Jing in the lead role, alongside Nicholas Tse, Yu Shi, Ci Sha, Chen Lijun, Zhang Jin, Tony Leung Ka-fai, and Jet Li. The film was theatrically released in mainland China on February 17, 2026, during the Chinese New Year.

Blades of the Guardians follows the fugitive bounty hunter Dao Ma (Jing) as he escorts the empire's most wanted man, Zhi Shi Lang (Yizhou), across the dangerous Taklamakan Desert to Chang'an during the crumbling late Sui dynasty. This high-stakes trek is triggered when Dao Ma clashes with the tyrannical Chisha Town chief, Chang Guiren (Li). The film received generally positive reviews from critics, who praised Yuen Woo-ping's direction, inventive martial arts choreography, and large-scale action, while some criticized its crowded narrative and underdeveloped characters. As of 2026, it is the highest-grossing wuxia film worldwide.

== Plot ==
During the Sui dynasty, Dao Ma is a bounty hunter with his nephew, Xiao Qi. After visiting a small village and accepting a bribe from the target, he is propositioned by Governor Chang to be the new martial arts instructor of his troops. Dao Ma declines even though he is offered a valuable sword, as he is tired of palace politics.

At another village, Dao Ma and his nephew stay at a modest inn run by a innkeeper and his family. Governor Chang's men show up and extort the innkeeper, who is revealed to be an infamous swordsman called the Two-Headed Snake. Dao Ma is vexed by Chang's interference in his bounty and suspects Chang is only doing so to force him to teach his troops. Two-Headed Snake and Dao Ma team up and defeat and seemingly kills Chang, though Two-Headed Snake perishes. Dao Ma grabs his nephew and flees, with the Governor's troops in hot pursuit. His assault on Chang causes him to become the most wanted criminal in the land.

Dao Ma takes refuge in Mojia Village, where the fierce Ayuya and her men are able to drive away Chang's troops. Ayuya is the chieftain's daughter and wishes to travel to the big city of Chang'an, however Dao Ma keeps her at bay. The Chieftain of Mojia Village Lao Mo did a lot for Dao Ma and now has called in a favour: Escort the revolutionary Zhishilang to safety before the Emperor's checkpoints and blockades keep him from leaving. Zhishilang's viewpoints opt for equality, so the Emperor's bounty now makes Zhishilang the highest bounty, even higher than Dao Ma's.

Dao Ma agrees to this journey, however before they depart Ayuya and her friend Ani decide to come along. Dao Ma is against this but Lao Mo convinces him to take her to Chang'an since she always wanted to go. Unbeknownst to Dao Ma, Lao Mo also wants to keep Ayuya safe because he cancelled her marriage to He Yixuan, the son of another clan who is still after her and considers Ayuya his bride still. Warriors Diting and One-eye show up at the innkeeper's place and massacre some of Chang's troops, seeking out Dao Ma for an unspecified reason.

While they are travelling by horse, the group is attacked by an assortment of bounty hunters and Chang's troops, who have caught up to them. After a fierce battle Zhishilang reveals he is not accustomed to rough travel and imposes himself into a horse drawn carriage, where another bounty hunter named Shu has in his charge Yan Ziniang, a crafty woman with a bounty on her head. Shu keeps Yan Ziniang in chains because it took him two weeks to capture her, and he allows the party to join his carriage.

Shu tricks the party into taking a shortcut in order to ambush them: He wants to keep his current bounty, and also collect on Dao Ma and Zhishilang's bounty as well, in order to be considered the greatest swordsman in the land. Dao Ma engages him in combat in an oil field, defeating him. Shu accepts his mercy and relents from attacking Dao Ma for the rest of their journey.

He Yixuan is able to pitch to other clan leaders that someone is aiding Zhishilang and tries to make them all swear an oath of fealty to Pei Shiju, who is now in charge of the troops in the area. When Lao Mo refuses to do so, He Yixuan brings in some mercenary raiders to buff up his forces, causing Lao Mo to realize they will be coming after Mojia Village and will also be after Ayuya.

Mojia Village evacuates most of its occupants, while the rest who didn’t evacuate stay for battle, but the mercenary raiders and He Yixuan takes over Mojia Village, then go after Dao Ma and his party. He Yixuan shows Ayuya the head of Lao Mo, and a battle starts. Before Ayuya and Dao Ma can defeat them, the other clan leaders show up and witness the bodies of their sons defeated by Dao Ma, and He Yixuan is able to rile them into a frenzy to go after Dao Ma's group. The clans give chase, but Dao Ma's party is pincered by the arrival of two of his old colleagues, Diting and One-eye. Dao Ma leads his group into the sandstorm and are followed by the clans. When the storm settles, Dao Ma's nephew says he witnessed He Yixuan take away Ayuya. Dao Ma continues his mission to lead Zhishilang to safety before time runs out.

At the boat crossing, Dao Ma says he cannot take Zhishilang the rest of the way and offers Shu a large amount to finish the journey, and also keep an eye on his nephew. Shu agrees but Zhishilang refuses to go since He Yixuan wants him. Zhishilang offers himself up to trade for Ayuya.

At Mojia Village, the mercenary raiders and He Yixuan have set up their troops, and He Yixuan gets drunk and prepares to assault Ayuya. Ani breaks in and tries to defeat him, but she is quickly overpowered by the raiders. He Yixuan is about to finish what he was doing when he is told Dao Ma has returned, but with Zhishilang. At the gates, Dao Ma demands the release of Ayuya and a prisoner swap. He Yixuan pretends he doesn't need Zhishilang alive but then relents and trades someone in a sack. Dao Ma sends over Zhishilang, but the other individual is revealed to be a dying Ani. Dao Ma engages the troops in battle, as does "Zhishilang," who is actually Shu, having swapped clothes earlier.

Dao Ma and Shu fight their way throughout the village. He Yixuan begins to slaughter innocent civilians and Pei Shiju gives up his command in order to fight against them. Suddenly, the mercenary raiders receive new orders to withdraw and stop their support of He Yixuan. Ayuya manages to convince a slow witted Wululu, the sole surviving son of the clan leaders from the earlier battle, to release her.

Diting and One-eye return with a captured Zhishilang and Dao Ma's nephew. In a flashback, it is revealed that Diting, One-Eye and Dao Ma were part of a squad of elite soldiers. When Dao Ma's sister gives birth to Xiao Qi, the illegitimate son of the current emperor's father, Dao Ma's sister and nephew were ordered to be killed. Diting helped Dao Ma and Xiao Qi to escape after his sister was killed. The Emperor then had the whole squad killed except for Diting and One-eye who were ordered to find Xiao Qi. Dao Ma, refusing to hand over his nephew, engages Diting in combat. Shu is able to defeat One-eye, while after a prolonged battle, Dao Ma is able to tackle both himself and Diting off a wall and onto the ground below. Impaling a sword through his own body, Dao Mao fatally stabs Diting. He then finds Ayuya just as she kills He Yixuan.

Dao Ma heals from his injuries and rides off with Xiao Qi, Shu, Zhishilang and Yan Zhiniang.

== Cast ==
- Wu Jing as Dao Ma
- Nicholas Tse as Diting
- Yu Shi as Shu
- Chen Lijun as Ayuya
- Sun Yizhou as Zhishilang
- Ci Sha as He Yixuan
- Li Yunxiao as Yan Ziniang
- Tony Leung Ka-fai as Lao Mo
- Zhang Jin as Two-headed snake
- Kara Wai as Madam Yuchi
- Zhang Yi as Pei Shiju
- Jet Li as Chang Guiren
- Wen Junhui as Yuji Niuluo
- Liu Yaowen as Pei Xingyan
- Dong Sicheng as Da Lai

== Production ==
=== Preparation and first shoot ===
The film was registered and green-lit in May 2023, then in December 2023, it was revealed that Yuen Woo-ping will direct the live-action film. In June 2024, it was announced that Wu Jing will produce the film and star as the lead role Dao Ma, with Nicholas Tse joining the cast. In the following months, Yu Shi and Jet Li joined the cast. The project was an adaptation of the Biao Ren manhua by Xu Xianzhe. Director Yuen Woo-ping and producer/star Wu Jing were attracted by the traditional chivalrous code and contemporary sentiment contained in the comic after reading it, and the project was positioned as a "comic book adaptation martial arts blockbuster" aimed at revitalizing martial arts films.

To meet Yuen Woo-ping's high standards for action scenes, all main actors had to join the crew in advance before filming began, undergoing systematic closed training including traditional martial arts, swordsmanship, and horse riding. To closely resemble the protagonist's character, Wu Jing made long-term physical preparations, growing a beard and long hair in advance, and undergoing rigorous equestrian and action training.

Principal photography officially began in Xinjiang and Beijing on July 26, 2024, and the first round of shooting wrapped on November 27 of the same year.

=== Controversy involving the lead actress ===
In June 2025, when the film had been completed and entered the post-production stage, the lead actress, Nashi, who played the important role of Ayuya, was embroiled in controversy related to her educational background. The Inner Mongolia Autonomous Region Joint Working Group issued a notice stating that she was suspected of falsifying her college entrance examination application materials. Previously, she had been exposed for being admitted to the Shanghai Theatre Academy with a lower score through the Inner Mongolia "targeted training" policy, but she failed to fulfill the agreement and returned to her hometown to work, which was suspected of being a breach of contract.

This incident triggered widespread public questioning of educational fairness and celebrity privilege, and the storm quickly spread to the film project. The production company immediately removed her from the list of lead actors. Since the role was involved throughout the film, simple deletion was not feasible, and the film, which was originally scheduled to be released in 2025, faced the double crisis of delay and reshoots.

=== Reshoot ===
In order to minimize the impact of the Nashi incident on the film, the production company finally decided to replace the actress and organize an 11-day reshoot. Yue opera actress Chen Lijun took over the role of Ayuya. According to multiple media reports, the reshoots significantly increased the total cost of the film from approximately RMB 550 million to values cited as being between RMB 650 million to 700 million, and the film's original release date of 2025 was postponed as a result. Ultimately, the budget increased to RMB 850 million.

== Release ==
The film was released on 17 February 2026, with Well Go USA Entertainment handling the film's North American distribution. It was released in the United Kingdom and Ireland by Trinity CineAsia on 17 April 2026.

== Reception ==
=== Box office ===
As of August 20, 2026, Blades of the Guardians has grossed approximately $215.4 million worldwide, including $212.1 million in China and $1.6 million in the United States and Canada. The film became the highest-grossing wuxia film in Chinese box-office history, surpassing The Legend of the Condor Heroes: The Gallants. It later surpassed Crouching Tiger, Hidden Dragon (2000) to become the highest-grossing wuxia film worldwide.

==== China ====
The film was released in mainland China on February 17, 2026, during the Chinese New Year holiday. It earned ¥806 million during the holiday period, ranking third among the holiday releases. On February 22, it surpassed ¥689.7 million including presales to become the highest-grossing wuxia film in Chinese cinema history. Its gross subsequently exceeded ¥1 billion on February 27, and it finished its theatrical run on May 20 with ¥1.448 billion and 31.426 million admissions.

==== Other territories ====
Outside China, the film grossed approximately $3.3 million, including $1.6 million in the United States and Canada, $1.1 million in Hong Kong, and smaller grosses in Australia, New Zealand and the United Kingdom. Its worldwide gross surpassed $214 million by March 29, making it the highest-grossing wuxia film worldwide and overtaking Crouching Tiger, Hidden Dragon, which had held the record for 26 years.

=== Critical response ===
On the review aggregator website Rotten Tomatoes, 94% of 33 critics' reviews are positive, with an average rating of 8/10. The website's consensus reads: "Blades of the Guardians masterfully showcases director Yuen Woo-Ping's feel for fluid action, delivering a fiercely entertaining spectacle surging with pulpy melodrama and grand battles."

The film received generally positive reviews, with critics consistently praising its martial arts choreography and action while differing over its narrative and large ensemble.

Simon Abrams of RogerEbert.com gave the film 3.5 out of 4 stars, calling it a "thrilling, giant-sized wuxia martial arts fantasy" and praising Yuen Woo-ping's character-driven action and ensemble. Leslie Felperin of The Guardian gave it 3 out of 5 stars, praising its elaborate set pieces and sword fights but criticizing its basic plot and "overwrought and dreary" score.

David West of Sight and Sound praised the action and Wu Jing's performance but criticized the film's cluttered storytelling, arguing that its constant chases and duels left little room for its numerous subplots and characters to develop. Edmund Lee of the South China Morning Post gave the film 3.5 out of 5 stars, praising its action, Wu Jing and Yuen's direction while noting that its many characters and backstories could make the narrative difficult to follow.

Xueting C. Ni of Eastern Kicks called the film an "amazing piece of Wuxia cinema" and praised Yuen's adaptation of Xu Xianzhe's Biao Ren manhua, particularly his integration of action with exposition and characterization. She also highlighted the film's blend of traditional wuxia conventions with modern action filmmaking and its themes of personal development and xia, describing the collaboration between Yuen and Xu as a "perfect union" between a leading wuxia choreographer and a contemporary manhua storyteller.

Matt McCracken of In Review Online offered a more enthusiastic assessment, calling it an "uncomplicatedly excellent exercise in tentpole spectacle". He praised its straightforward storytelling for allowing the action and performances of Wu Jing, Nicholas Tse and Max Zhang to take center stage, and viewed the film as a throwback to Yuen's earlier wuxia productions.
