= Crossing (2026 film) =

2026 film by Xu Zhanxiong

- Theatrical release poster
- Chinese: 四渡
- Literal meaning: Four Crossings of the Chishui River
- Hanyu Pinyin: Sì dù
- Directed by: Xu Zhanxiong
- Written by: Liu Yi; Xu Zhanxiong; Rong Chao
- Produced by: Andrew Lau
- Starring: Liu Ye; Wang Lei; Yu Shi; Wang Zhifei; Wang Yaoqing
- Production companies: Bona Film Group; Guangzhou Broadcasting Network; August First Film Studio
- Release dates: 9 June 2026 (Guiyang); 28 June 2026 (China)
- Running time: 122 minutes
- Country: China
- Language: Mandarin
- Box office: US$35 million

Crossing (Chinese: 四渡; pinyin: Sì Dù; lit. 'Four Crossings of the Chishui River') is a 2026 Chinese war film directed by Xu Zhanxiong and written by Yi Liu. The film depicts the Battle of Chishui River, a major campaign during the Long March of the Chinese Workers' and Peasants' Red Army. Produced to commemorate the 90th anniversary of the Long March, the film stars Liu Ye, Wang Lei, Yu Shi, Wang Zhifei, and Wang Yaoqing.

== Premise ==
The film covers the Battle of Chishui River between the Republic of China and Chinese Soviet Republic.

== Cast ==
- Liu Ye as Mao Zedong
- Wang Lei as Zhou Enlai
- Yu Shi as Zhao Defa
- Wang Zhifei as Zhu De
- Wang Yaoqing as Chiang Kai-shek
- Lin Yongjian as Wang Jialie
- Zhang Li as Soong Mei-ling
- Timmy Xu as Bo Gu
- Lan Yingying as Wan Shufen
- Cao Bingkun as Liu Bocheng
- Ashton Chen as Nie Rongzhen
- Wu Yue as Long Yun
- Xiong Ziqi as Zhang Xueliang
- Li Chen as Wu Qiwei
- Yu Xiaoguang as City Defense Commander

== Production ==
Bona Film Group, Guangzhou Broadcasting Network, and August First Film Studio produced a film about the Battle of Chishui River; Bona Film Group was the main production company. Bona Film Group previously produced The Battle at Lake Changjin (2021), another film depicting the People's Liberation Army.

Shot in Guizhou, there were 32 shooting locations and 107 sets. Zhou Shen created a music video for the theme song.

== Release ==
Crossing premiered in Guiyang on 9 June 2026, and was theatrically released on 26 June. It earned CN¥79.3 million in its opening weekend, finishing first at the Chinese box office. Well Go USA Entertainment will release Crossing in the United States on 10 July.

== Works cited ==
=== News ===
- Deng, Xian; Liu, Changyu, eds. (28 June 2026). 大型史诗电影《四渡》在遵义开机. Xinhua News Agency. Archived from the original on 1 July 2026.
- Ramachandran, Naman (28 June 2026). "China Box Office: 'Crossing' Debuts at No. 1 as 'Toy Story 5' Places Second". Variety. Archived from the original on 30 June 2026.
- Wong, Silvia (14 May 2026). "Cannes 2026: The hot projects from Hong Kong and China". Screen International.

=== Web ===
- "Crossing". Well Go USA Entertainment. Archived from the original on 2 July 2026.
- "Crossing (2026)". Mubi. Archived from the original on 1 July 2026.
- "Historical film Crossing hits theaters nationwide". Guizhou. 26 June 2026. Archived from the original on 1 July 2026.
- "Historical film Crossing premieres in Guizhou". Guizhou. 11 June 2026. Archived from the original on 1 July 2026.
- Zhang, Rui (17 April 2026). "Film 'Crossing' to mark 90th anniversary of Long March". China Internet Information Center.
