= Yu Shi (actor) =

Chinese actor, singer-songwriter (born 1996)

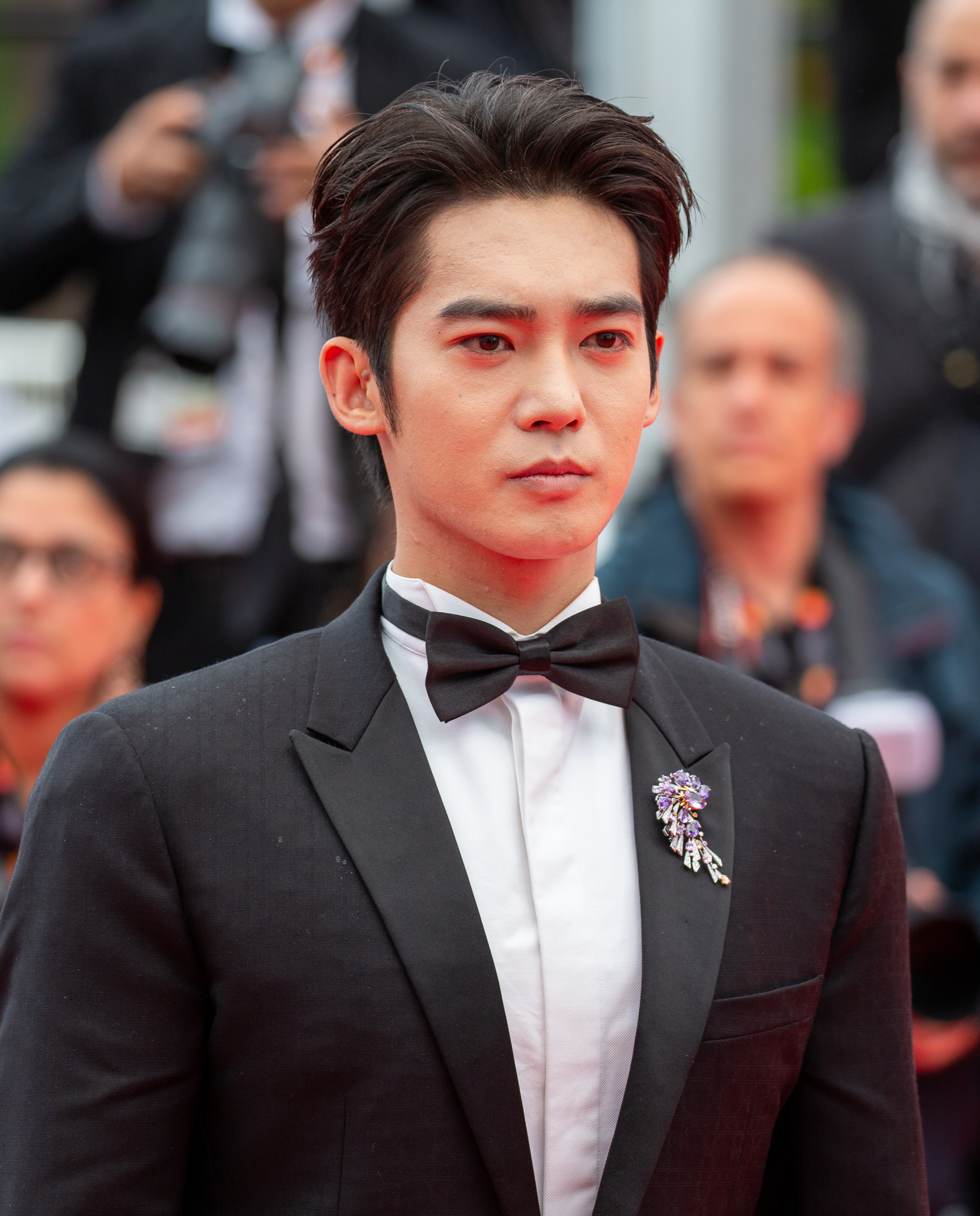
- Yu at the 2025 Cannes Film Festival
- Born: Yu Zhi; December 22, 1996 (age 29); Lingyuan, Chaoyang, Liaoning, China
- Other names: Yosh Yu; Ashan Yu
- Education: Liaoning Technical University
- Occupations: Actor; singer-songwriter
- Years active: 2013–present
- Agent(s): Shanghai Biyou Film and Television Media Co., Ltd
- Height: 5 ft 11.5 in (1.82 m)

Chinese name
- Traditional Chinese: 于適
- Simplified Chinese: 于适
Transcriptions
Standard Mandarin
- Hanyu Pinyin: Yú Shì

Yu Shi (Chinese: 于适; pinyin: Yú Shì; born 22 December 1996), born Yu Zhi (Chinese: 于植; pinyin: Yú Zhí), also known as Yosh or Ashan Yu, is a Chinese actor and singer-songwriter. He is best known for his starring roles in Creation of the Gods I: Kingdom of Storms (2023) and To the Wonder (2024).

== Early life ==
Yu was born on 22 December 1996 in Lingyuan, Chaoyang City, Liaoning Province, of Mongolian descent. At the age of 13, he left Chaoyang for a basketball youth training program at the Fuxin Basketball School. He spent five years there before being recommended for admission to the basketball major at Liaoning Technical University. Friends in the film industry encouraged him to pursue acting, and he decided to begin pursuing auditions.

== Career ==
Yu Shi made his television debut in the second season of singing competition Chinese Idol in 2014 under the name Yu Zhi.

After returning to China in 2017, he was invited to audition for a training camp for the film series Creation of the Gods on the strength of his advertisement for Jordan Brand titled Victory Is Decided by Me: The Day of Decision. Yu and 20 other young actors were admitted to the camp from over 10,000 people. At the camp, Yu became proficient in equestrianism and horseback archery. Two weeks before the start of filming, it was announced that he was to play in the starring role of Ji Fa. Yu expressed gratitude to director Wuershan for his support, despite his lack of an academic acting background. In an interview with French magazine Prestige, he stated that, “when we’re 18 or 19 years old, we’re at the stage where we’re most passionate about achieving our dreams and we need encouragement to go further. Instead, so many talented ones give up, because rejection is such a cruel blow. If you find kids who are talented at something, you must encourage them to go further since they might become someone important in the field in the future.”

Since Yu's management agency wanted Creation of the Gods I to be Yu's film debut, Yu was unable to film anything for almost three years. Instead, he devoted his time to studying horse training. In April 2023, at the 3rd Guangdong Provincial Equestrian Festival, Yu won an award in the Riding and Shooting Championship Invitational.

Yu's debut film, Born to Fly, co-starring Wang Yibo, Hu Jun, and Zhou Dongyu, was released on April 28, 2023. He gained significant attention after the release of Creation of the Gods I in July 2023, three years after the shooting. On June 9, he won the "New Emerging Actor of the Year" award at the Douyin Movie Awards.

After the success of Creation of the Gods I, Yu joined various projects, including performing in the program The Most Beautiful Show, and providing the Mandarin Chinese voice dub of the goat Valentino in the Disney film Wish. He and Jerry Lamb co-hosted the closing ceremony and awards ceremony of the fifth Hainan International Film Festival. He ended 2023 by performing in the 2024 Jiangsu Satellite TV New Year's Eve Concert, singing the song "The Fox". Yu also released several new songs. He released the song "Long Xiangyi" (长相忆) in November, and, later in December, released his solo single "Dream Bubble" (梦幻泡影).

Yu's next television project was a starring role in To the Wonder, a 2024 television drama about Kazakh nomads adapted from Chinese writer Li Juan's essay collection My Altay. His experiences studying horse training and equestrian stunts proved useful, and Yu served as an equestrian advisor for the production team. He worked well with director Teng Congcong and praised her directorial vision, stating that, "with her delicate sensibility she’s good at observing the details, and knows how to portray female innocence and difficulties in life, but she’s also capable of finding men’s charm and magnifying it from a women’s perspective."

Yu served as a judge for the short film section of the 2024 Beijing International Film Festival's "ReelFocus New Blood Imaging Program." Later that year, he participated and served as a narrator for the program "Walking with the People: Original Action to Support Regional Coordinated Development," organized by the China Federation of Literary and Art Circles and the China Literary and Art Volunteers Association. In September 2024, Yu was appointed as the "Cultural Ambassador for the Daozhonghua Cultural Communication Platform."

== Endorsements ==
In November 2023, Yu was appointed as a brand ambassador for the French luxury fashion house Dior. In January 2024, French high-end beauty brand Guerlain announced that Yu as its brand ambassador. In April 2024, he was selected to become the brand ambassador for Swiss luxury watch brand Hublot. On April 20, 2024, Yu was selected to become the Chinese brand ambassador for French luxury jewellery house Chaumet.

== Personal life ==
Yu has maintained strong ties with his background in sports. With the approval of the China Ethnic Minority Sports Association, Yu was appointed the deputy director of the Archery and Equestrian Sports Center of the China Ethnic Minority Sports Association. He represented the Guangdong Team in the first National Equestrian Archery Championship.

On January 8, 2025, Yu donated funds for earthquake relief efforts in Shigatse, Tibet.

== Filmography ==
=== Film ===
Year	English title	Role	Note	Ref.
2023	Born to Fly	Deng Fang		
2023	Creation of the Gods I: Kingdom of Storms	Ji Fa		
2023	Wish	Valentino	Chinese dub	
2024	Pegasus 2	Lone wolf rider	Cameo	
2024	Howl's Moving Castle	Howl	Chinese dub	
2024	Welcome to My Side	ChenXiaoZhou		
2025	Creation of the Gods II: Demon Force	King Wu (Ji Fa)		
2025	Operation Hadal	Han Xiao		
2026	Blades of the Guardians	Shu		
2026	Crossing	Zhao Defa		
TBA	Creation of the Gods III	King Wu (Ji Fa)		

=== Television series ===
Year	English title	Role	Note	Ref.
2024	To the Wonder	Batai	Male Lead role	
