= Just for Kicks (2005 film) =

- Directed by: Thibaut de Longeville; Lisa Leone
- Written by: Come Chantrel; Thibaut de Longeville
- Produced by: Alex Stapleton; Patrick Cariou; Danny Boy O'Connor
- Starring: Grandmaster Caz; Joseph Simmons; Darryl McDaniels; Damon Dash; Doze; Missy Elliott; Bobbito Garcia; Adam Horovitz
- Cinematography: Lisa Leone
- Edited by: Scott Stevenson
- Music by: Joe Rudge
- Production companies: CAID Productions; Program 33; Canal+
- Distributed by: Image Entertainment
- Release date: April 23, 2005
- Running time: 67 minutes
- Country: United States
- Language: English

Just for Kicks is a 2005 American documentary film about the sneaker phenomena and history. It includes self-confessed "sneakerheads" like Grandmaster Caz, Reverend Run, and Missy Elliott. It tells the story of the Nike Air Force Ones, which are called "Uptowns" in New York, and the beginning of Air Jordans. The documentary also tells the story of how hip-hop pioneers DJ Run, Jam Master Jay, and DMC had everyone wearing Adidas Superstars with their song "My Adidas".

== Interviews ==
- Grandmaster Caz
- Joseph Simmons
- Darryl McDaniels
- Damon Dash
- Doze
- Missy Elliott
- Bobbito Garcia
- Adam Horovitz
- Koe Rodriguez
- Futura 2000

== Release ==
Just For Kicks premiered at the Tribeca Film Festival on April 23, 2005. Image Entertainment released it on DVD on June 6, 2006.

== Reception ==
Dennis Harvey of Variety called it "aptly slick and stylish as a TV commercial". Giovanni Fazio of The Japan Times rated it 2/5 stars and wrote that the film is more of an unwitting documentary about mental illness than it is about sneakers. Gil Jawetz of DVD Talk rated it 2.5/5 stars and wrote that the filmmaker's enthusiasm for the subject is not enough to make it compelling.

== Accolades ==
The film won "Best Documentary", and "Best Overall Film" at the USVI Film festival. It was part of the official selection at Tribeca Film Festival, Sheffield Documentary Festival, International Documentary Film Festival Amsterdam, Bangkok International Film Festival, Res Fest, New York Latino Film Festival, San Francisco Black Film Festival, NYC Urban World Festival, Leipzig Documentary Festival, and US Virgin Islands Film Festivals.
