= Thibaut de Longeville =

French writer and filmmaker

- Born: 1974 (age 51–52)
- Occupation: Filmmaker
- Website: Official website

Thibaut de Longeville (born 1974) is a writer, filmmaker, creative director, brand marketer and entrepreneur.

== Biography ==
=== Early life ===
In 1995, at the age of 21, he founded 360 Communications. 360's two first projects were designing the visual identity for the Tour de France’s new mountain bike event, Le Tour VTT, and organizing an aerosol art tribute to The Rolling Stones in conjunction with Virgin Records and Agnès b.

=== Career ===
In 1998, 360 became the official marketing and creative consulting outfit for Virgin Music / EMI Records’s national and international urban music roster.

As a director, De Longeville made his debut with the film Just for Kicks : a documentary about sneakers, Hip-Hop & the corporate game. Combining interviews, fast-paced narration and animated graphics, Just For Kicks premiered at the Tribeca Film Festival New York in 2005 and won awards for "Best Documentary", "Best Overall Film" and "Best Director" at the USVI Film festival, Sheffield Documentary Festival, International Documentary Film Festival Amsterdam, Bangkok International Film Festival, Res Fest, New York Latino Film Festival, San Francisco Black Film Festival, NYC Urban World Festival, and the Leipzig Documentary Festival.

Since then, De Longeville has directed and produced over 10 documentary features, including 5 seasons of Quai 54 : Streetball Stories, a portrait of Nike designer Tinker Hatfield, and a segment about Jay-Z’s Global Express Tour shot in Taiwan for The Oprah Winfrey Show. He is Executive Producer of Doin' It in the Park:Pickup Basketball NYC

Since 2002, De Longeville has also been the co-producer of the international streetball tournament Quai 54, which he also co-founded, held every summer in Paris. Nicknamed "The French Rucker", the event has 16 international teams compete for the championship over one week-end, with live performances by Fat Joe, Ludacris and Usher.

In 2023, he directed the documentary in 6 episodes, DJ Mehdi - Made in France.
