= Dong Yong (actor) =

Chinese actor

- Born: Dong Jing 董晶; 15 December 1968 (age 57); Hangzhou, Zhejiang
- Years active: 1988–present

Chinese name
- Traditional Chinese: 董勇
- Simplified Chinese: 董勇
Transcriptions
Standard Mandarin
- Hanyu Pinyin: Dǒng Yǒng

Dong Yong (other names: 董勇, Tung Yung; born 15 December 1968, China) is a Chinese actor. He studied singing, opera and kung-fu.

== Biography ==
Yong moved into television shortly after he graduated. His films include: Black Hole, Task Force No. 6, Tree Of Love, Absolute Control, 120 Million, Dead Man's Diary, Evil Blaster, The Oliver Tree Of My Life, Seven Years' Marriage and No Divorce For Me.

== Filmography ==
Dong Yong has appeared in the following films:

- Gimme Kudos (2005)
- Fearless (2006) - Nong Jinsun
- Lady Cop & Papa Crook (2008)
- Murderer (2009)
- Ocean Heaven (2010)
- The Lost Bladesman (2011)
- The Silent War (2012)
- A Mysterious Bullet (2014)
- For Love or Money (2014)
- Age of Glory (2015)
- Battle of Xiangjiang River (2017)
- Game of Hunting (2017)
- Novoland: Eagle Flag (2019)

=== Television Series ===
- Blossoms Shanghai (2023)
- Swords Into Plowshares (2026) - Feng Dao
