= Tunde Wey =

Nigerian chef and writer (born 1983)

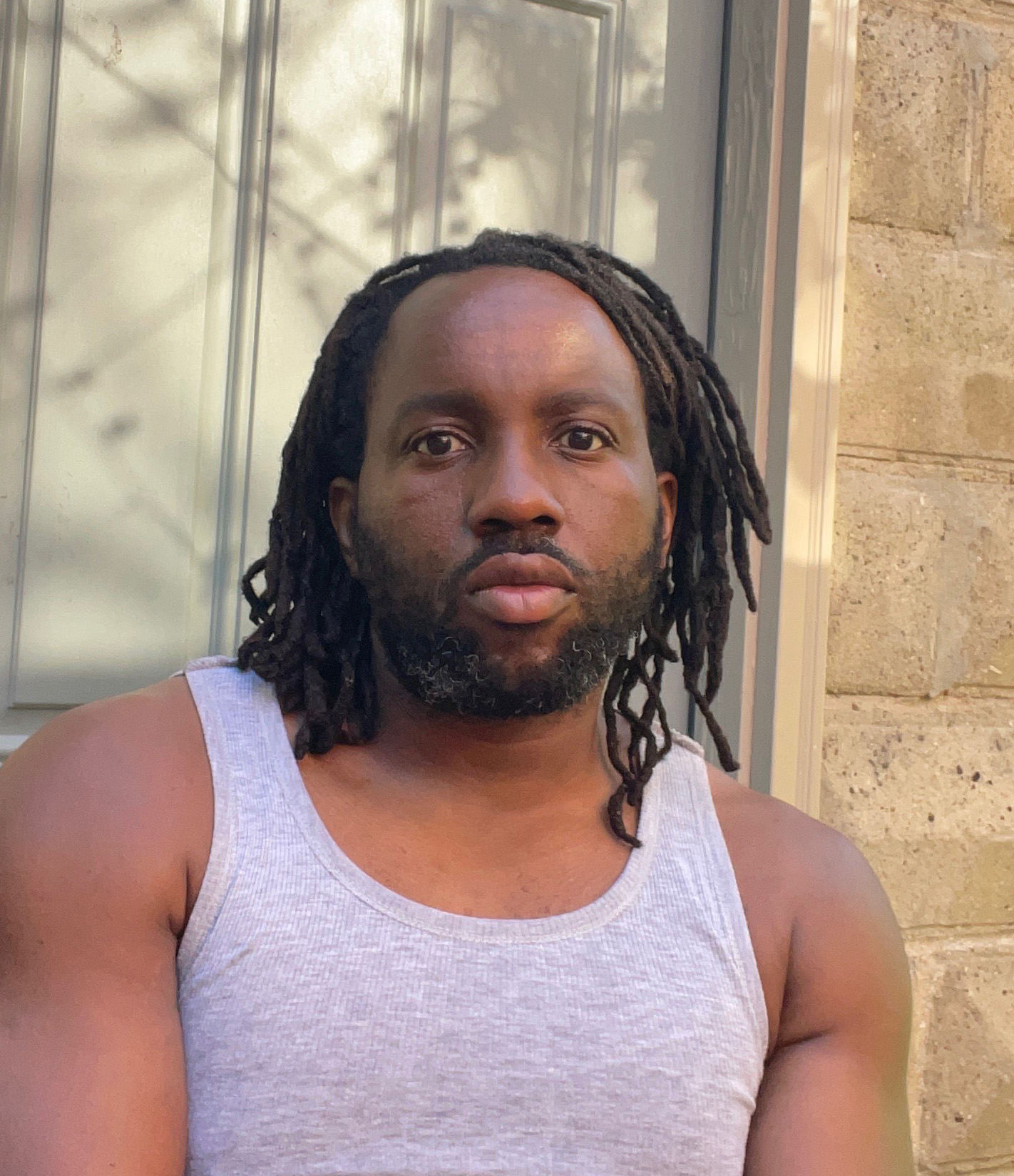
- Born: Akintunde William Wey; Lagos, Nigeria
- Citizenship: Nigeria
- Occupations: Chef, Writer

Tunde Wey (born 1983) is a chef and writer. He "uses Nigerian food to interrogate colonialism, capitalism and racism."

== Early life and education ==
Tunde Wey was born in Lagos, Nigeria, to middle-class parents. In 1999, he immigrated to the United States to attend college. In Detroit, he studied at a community college for six years before eventually pursuing his interest in cooking.

== Career ==
In 2013, Wey opened his first restaurant, Revolver, a venue that hosted pop-up dinners with chefs across the metropolitan Detroit area. The restaurant hosted its final dinner in March 2020 and the co-owner, Peter Dalinowski, confirmed its official closure in October 2020.

As a chef, Wey is widely known for hosting pop-up dinners that provoke social and political conversations. At Saartj, his lunch stall at the Roux Carre market in New Orleans, Wey charged white diners two and a half times as much as black diners and other people of color; the number was chosen based on the city's black-white income gap and diners were told the profits would be redistributed to people of color. The concept was similar to a pop-up he hosted in Nashville, Tennessee, "H*t Chicken Sh*t", where Wey served the city's popular dish, hot chicken and used a tiered pricing structure to provoke conversation about gentrification in North Nashville. Black attendees dined for free while white diners were charged up to $1000 for a portion of a meal or could make a donation of a deed to a local property for a complete meal, The event raised more than $50,000 towards affordable housing in the city. In addition to hosting dinners about Blackness and racism in the United States, Wey has hosted dinners to encourage attendees to interrogate US immigration laws and the experience of undocumented immigrants.

== Personal life ==
After Wey's student visa expired, he lived for several years without the legal documentation to remain in the United States. In 2015, he was detained by border patrol while travelling by Greyhound bus. He became a permanent US resident in 2019.
