= Tencent Animation and Comics =

Animation and comics website

- Company type: Subsidiary
- Website type: Animation, Comics
- Available in: Mandarin Chinese
- Owner: Tencent
- Website: https://ac.qq.com
- Commercial: Yes
- Launched: March 21, 2012

Tencent Animation and Comics (Chinese: 腾讯动漫) is a Chinese animation and comics website which is owned by Tencent. It was founded in 2012. In June 2019, Tencent Animation and Comics was named on the 2019 Forbes List of China's Most Innovative Companies.

== History ==
In March 2015, Tencent Animation and Comics announced the introduction of 200 Japanese light novels and 500 Japanese comics at the UP2015 Tencent Interactive Entertainment Annual Launch, including the distribution rights of One Piece, Naruto and Reborn!. On July 10, 2015, Tencent launched its mobile phone app and created e-books in collaboration with Japan's KADOKAWA Group to introduce Japanese light fiction, the first works included A Certain Magical Index and Durarara!!. On September 17, 2015, Tencent established a wholly owned subsidiary of Tencent Pictures in Beijing. And announced that Tencent animation platform has more than 20,000 comic works, more than 9000 certified authors, nearly 500 signed authors, more than 40 comics and more than 100 million clicks.

== Publish ==
Tencent pays comic book writers the most basic fees. In the award, Tencent animation platform set up Tencent animation original contest and star comics award, the final winner of the contestants in addition to material rewards, but also from Japanese animation professionals guidance and direct job opportunities. In 2015, Tencent launched the dream chase program, which rewards newly uploaded works with a minimum of 100 yuan, and an incentive of 800 yuan for experienced authors to update a certain number of works each month.

== Operation ==
Tencent oversees the pre-production of comics, and the work develops using a common commercial model that includes product placement, joint promotions, and advertising. Once a work has gained a broad fan base, it is adapted for licensing. There are both free and pay-to-read comics available to website users. For VIP members, some pay-to-read comics are free, while others come with a 20% discount.
