= Prestige (magazine) =

French women's magazine

- Categories: Fashion
- Frequency: Monthly
- Total circulation: 30,000
- Founded: 1993; 33 years ago
- Company: Nadim Publications and Informations
- Country: Lebanon
- Based in: Baabda
- Website: www.prestigemag.co

Prestige is a monthly French magazine dedicated largely to women's fashion, jewelry and lifestyle. Prestige readers are mainly between 25 and 64 years old. The magazine is based in Chebbak Baabda.

== History ==
In 1993, Nadim Publications and Informations (NPI) launched the Prestige magazine—an innovative press concept in Lebanon. It has been evolving yearly by introducing new columns into its pages.

Prestige magazine circulates 30,000 copies, which are distributed across Lebanon, Egypt, Jordan, Syria, France, and Canada. It is also found on MEA's board for a full coverage.
