= Li Juan (author) =

Chinese essayist (born 1979)

Li Juan (Chinese: 李娟; born July 1979) is a Chinese essayist. Most of her works are centred around nomadic life in the Altay region of Xinjiang.

== Biography ==
Li Juan was born in 1979 in Kuytun City, Xinjiang. Her parents were originally from Sichuan Province. She began to publish her writing in 1999 and has since published more than ten essay collections. Most of her works detail her personal experiences of the landscape and Kazakh nomads of Xinjiang's Altay region. Li was among the winners of the Seventh Lu Xun Literary Prize (2014–17). In a New York Times article, Eric Abrahamsen wrote that Li's career has taken a "wild path" and that she "may be as far outside of the system as Chinese writers are able to get and still publish".

Her memoir is the basis for To the Wonder.

== Selected works ==
- Nine Snows (2003)
- My Altay (2010)
- Corners of Altay (2010)
- Travelling Through the Night: Please Sing Out Loud (2011)
- Remember Little, Forget More (2017)

== Translated works (English) ==
- Distant Sunflower Fields (2021) translated by Christopher Payne
- Winter Pasture: One Woman's Journey with China's Kazakh Herders (2021) translated by Jack Hargreaves and Yan Yan
