= Deng Chao =

Chinese actor, comedian, singer and director (born 1979)

- 邓超
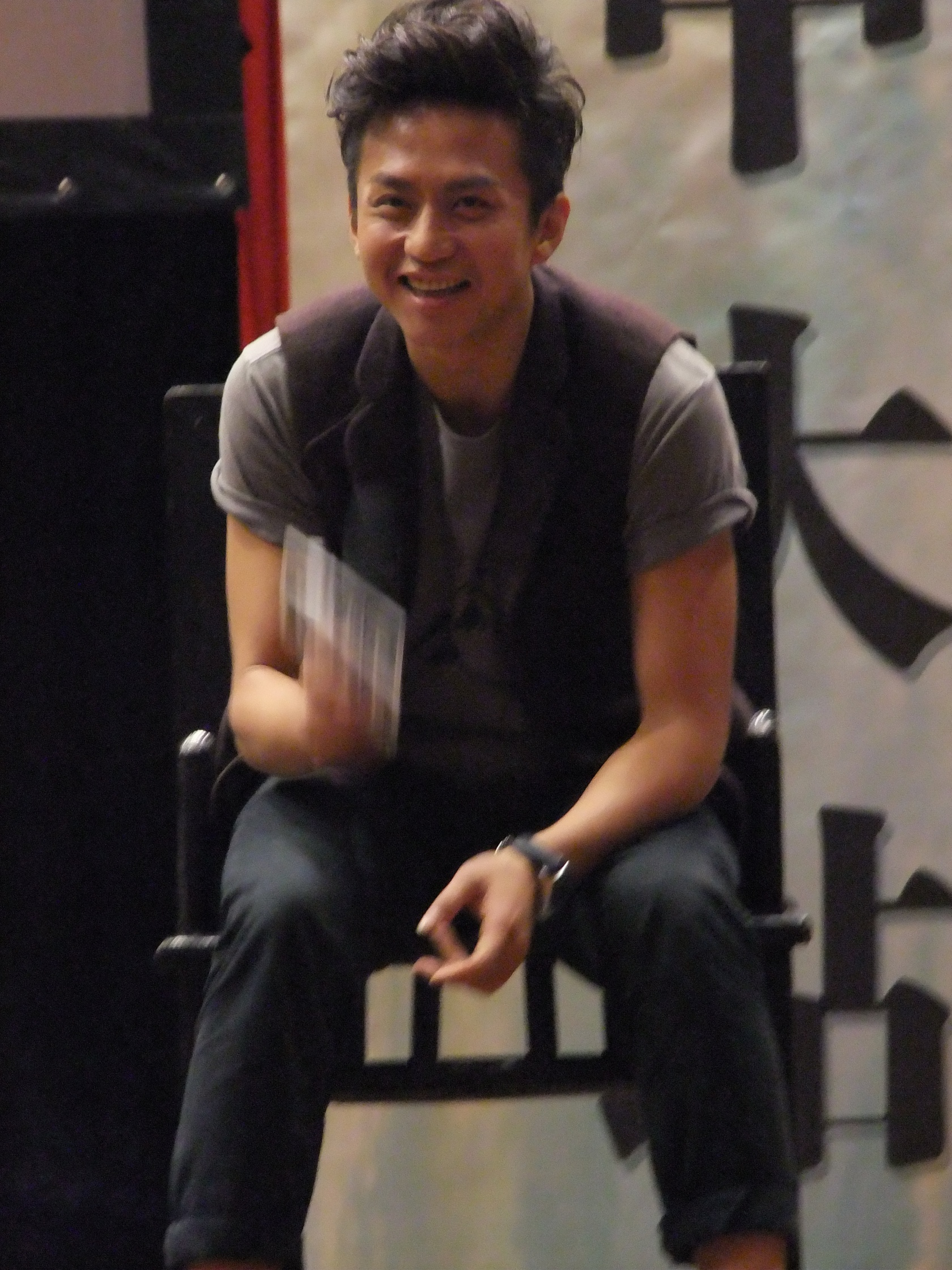
- Deng in 2011
- Born: 8 February 1979 (age 47); Nanchang, Jiangxi, China
- Education: Central Academy of Drama
- Occupations: Actor; Comedian; Film director; Singer
- Years active: 2000–present
- Agent: Deng Chao Studio
- Spouse: Sun Li (m. 2010)
- Children: 2

Deng Chao (simplified Chinese: 邓超; traditional Chinese: 鄧超; pinyin: Dèng Chāo, born 8 February 1979) is a Chinese actor and director. Deng received recognition for the television series The Young Emperor (2003) and Happiness as Flowers (2005). He later shifted his focus to films, starring in the box office hits Detective Dee and the Mystery of the Phantom Flame (2010), American Dreams in China (2013), The Dead End (2015), for which he won the Golden Rooster Award for Best Actor, The Mermaid (2016), Duckweed (2017), and Shadow (2018). He also directed and starred in The Breakup Guru (2014), Devil and Angel (2015) and Looking Up (2019). He was a cast member of variety show Keep Running from 2014 to 2019. He has been a cast member of web show HAHAHAHAHA since 2020.

== Early life ==
Deng was born into a second marriage family in Nanchang, Jiangxi, on 8 February 1979. His father was a museum secretary, and his mother was a factory cadre. His father has a son and a daughter, and His mother has a daughter. After they got married, they had Deng Chao. Since 1995, Deng studied in the theater program at the Jiangxi Vocational Academy of Art for three years. In 1998, he entered the Central Academy of Drama in Beijing.

== Career ==
=== 2000–2006: Early work and breakthrough ===
During his junior year at college, Deng was cast in the hit play Cuihua Shang Suancai, a student production presented by the Central Academy of Drama, through which he knew script-writer Yu Baimei, who would be his long-time professional partner. After graduation, he started filming dramas. He rose to fame with the 2003 historical drama The Young Emperor and further gained popularity with director Gao Xixi's military drama romance Happiness as Flowers, co-starring Sun Li.

=== 2007–2012: Increasing recognition ===
Due to his rising popularity, Deng scored a role in Feng Xiaogang's war film Assembly. For the film, Deng won the Best Supporting Actor at the Hundred Flowers Awards, successfully making his crossover to the big screen. The same year, he co-starred in Cao Baoping's romantic thriller The Equation of Love and Death and was awarded the Society award at the Golden Phoenix Awards for his performance.

In 2010, he starred in Tsui Hark's action-mystery film Detective Dee and the Mystery of the Phantom Flame, playing an albino detective named Bei Dong Lai. He earned a Best Supporting Actor nomination at the Hong Kong Film Awards. Deng next starred in fantasy film Mural (2011), directed by Gordon Chan and adapted from the renowned ghost novel "Strange Stories from a Chinese Studio". In 2012, he played Cold Blood in the wuxia film The Four, based on Woon Swee Oan's novel series Si Da Ming Bu (The Four Great Constables).

=== 2013–2015: Directorial works and Keep Running ===
In 2013, Deng starred as one of the three male leads in Peter Chan's film American Dreams in China, about three young men from poor backgrounds who achieved success by establishing an English teaching school. The film was a commercial success and earned positive reviews. Taipei Times called the movie a "a well-executed work of entertainment that preaches about China's growing power" and praised Deng for "delivering a focused performance as an idealist with a defeated ego".

Deng made his directorial debut with The Breakup Guru (2014), a romantic comedy co-created by him and Yu Baimei. Though it faced stiff competition from Hollywood blockbusters, the film grossed 180 million yuan in its opening week and ended up as one of the highest-grossing films in China that year. The same year, he joined Keep Running, a remake of the South Korean variety program Running Man. Keep Running enjoyed explosive popularity in China. That year, Deng was chosen as the Most Valuable Chinese Actor.

Deng then starred in crime film The Dead End directed by acclaimed director Cao Baoping, and was praised by critics for "breathing life into the role with riveting performances", as well as his chemistry with co-star Duan Yihong. He shared the Best Actor award with co-stars Duan and Guo Tao at the 18th Shanghai International Film Festival, and won another Best Actor trophy at the Golden Rooster Awards. Deng teamed up again with Yu Baimei for the comedy film Devil and Angel, following the success of The Breakup Guru. However, unlike its predecessor, the film was voted the Most Disappointing Film of 2015 and received criticism for its poor approach to comedy.

=== 2016–present: Success on the big screen ===
In 2016, Deng starred in Stephen Chow's film The Mermaid, where he plays a playboy businessman who falls in love with a mermaid that had been sent to assassinate him. The film broke numerous box office records, including biggest opening day and biggest single-day gross through its seventh day of release. Due to his success on the big screen, CBN Weekly named him the 3rd most commercially valuable celebrity in China; and the most lucrative actor on China's big screen that year.

In 2017, Deng starred in Han Han's sleeper hit Duckweed, playing a rebellious car racer who thinks that his parents misunderstood him. He next starred in the suspense crime film, The Liquidator, based on the bestselling crime novel series Evil Minds: City Light and directed by acclaimed TV director Xu Jizhou.

In 2018, Deng starred in Zhang Yimou's historical film, Shadow.

In 2019, Deng starred in the family drama film Looking Up, which he co-directed.

On 1 October 2020, the segment "The Way Home" from the drama film "My People, My Homeland", co-directed with Yu Baimei, was released. In the film, he played Qiao Shulin, a distributor of "Shadi Apples." On 24 October, he participated in the China Media Group's literary and artistic gala "Heroic Sons and Daughters – Commemorating the 70th Anniversary of the Chinese People's Volunteers Army's Participation in the War to Resist U.S. Aggression and Aid Korea."

In 2021, he served as the initiator of Tencent Video's international youth cultural exchange and boy group development program "CHUANG 2021." On 21 September, he co-hosted the "Bay Area Rising Moon – 2021 Greater Bay Area Mid-Autumn Film and Music Gala" along with Lan Yu, Nicholas Tse, Pang Wei, and others. On 30 December, he served as the host of the Golden Rooster Awards Closing and Awards Ceremony.

On 31 January 2022, he participated in the 2022 China Media Group Spring Festival Gala, performing in the segment "Joyful and Auspicious Year" and singing the song "Sense of the Times." On 30 July, he hosted the closing and awards ceremony of the 36th Hundred Flowers Awards for Popular Films.

On 21 January 2023, he participated in the 2023 China Media Group Spring Festival Gala.

== Personal life ==
Deng dated Nie Ning since they were both students at the Jiangxi Vocational Academy of Art. Nie was later admitted to the Central Academy of Drama, a year junior to Deng. They broke up after four years of relationship.

From 2002 to 2005, Deng dated his The Young Emperor co-star Hao Lei.

Deng has been married to actress Sun Li since 2010. They have two children, a son named Deng Han Zhi and a daughter named Deng Han Yi.

On 21 June 2014, he first launched his Sina Weibo account. In December 2015, Madame Tussauds created a wax figure of Deng Chao, and the figure was displayed at the Madame Tussauds museums in Beijing and Wuhan in 2016.

== Filmography ==
=== Film ===
Year	English title	Chinese title	Role	Notes	Ref.
2003	When Love Loses Its Memory	当爱情失去记忆	Li Buxiao		
2007	Assembly	集结号	Zhao Erdou		
2008	The Equation of Love and Death	李米的猜想	Fang Wen		
2008	Fit Lover	爱情呼叫转移2	Yuan Jia		
2009	The Founding of a Republic	建国大业	Xu Beihong	Cameo	
2010	Detective Dee and the Mystery of the Phantom Flame	狄仁杰与通天帝国	Bei Donglai		
2011	Perfect Baby	巴黎宝贝	Ma Xiaoshun		
2011	The Founding of a Party	建党伟业	Chen Yi		
2011	Mural	画壁	Zhu Xiaolian		
2012	The Four	四大名捕	Leng Xie		
2013	American Dreams in China	中国合伙人	Meng Xiaojun		
2013	The Four II	四大名捕2	Leng Xie		
2014	The Breakup Guru	分手大师	Mei Yuangui	Also director	
2014	The Four III	四大名捕3	Leng Xie		
2015	Jian Bing Man	煎饼侠	Deng Chao	Cameo	
2015	The Dead End	烈日灼心	Xin Xiaofeng		
2015	Hundred Regiments Offensive	百团大战	Zhang Zizhong	Cameo	
2015	Devil and Angel	恶棍天使	Mo Feili	Also director and producer	
2016	The Mermaid	美人鱼	Liu Xuan		
2016	I Belonged to You	从你的全世界路过	Chen Mo		
2017	Duckweed	乘风破浪	Xu Tailang		
2017	Sky Hunter	空天猎	Soldier	Cameo	
2017	The Liquidator	心理罪：城市之光	Fang Mu		
2018	Shadow	影	Zihu / Jingzhou		
2019	Looking Up	银河补习班	Ma Haowen	Also director	
2019	Midnight Diner	深夜食堂	Ah Xin	Cameo	
2020	My People, My Homeland	我和我的家乡	Qiao Sulin	Segment: "The Way Home"	
2020	The Sacrifice	金刚川	Gao Fulai		
2023	Ping Pong: The Triumph	中国乒乓之绝地反击	Dai Minjia	Also director	
2024	To Gather Around	胜券在握	Bai Sheng		

=== Television series ===
Deng Chao's television appearances
Year	English title	Chinese title	Role	Notes/Ref.
2001	The Joy of Spring	换了青春	Liang Dawei	
2003	The following is the fertile soil of sand	黄沙下面是沃土	Wang Heiyuan	
2003	The Young Emperor	少年天子	Shunzhi Emperor	
2004	Beijing Holiday	北京假日	Liu Xiaodong	
2004		谍战之特殊较量	Zhao Zhiqiang	
2005	The Royal Swordsmen	天下第一	Zheng De	
2005	Happiness as Flowers	幸福像花儿一样	Bai Yang	
2005	Young Kangxi	少年康熙	Kangxi Emperor	
2005		明末风云	Chongzhen Emperor	
2005		风流才子翻转天	Kuang Nanhai	
2006		爱了散了	Chen Feng	
2006	Young Justice Bao III	少年包青天3	Bao Zheng	
2006	New Stars in the Night	新昨夜星辰	Zhou Xinbang	
2007	Silent Tears	女人不哭	Zhao Jian	
2008	Romantic West St.	浪漫的西街	Hu Dawei	
2008		甜蜜蜜	Lei Lei	
2008	Rich Man Poor Love	钻石王老五的艰难爱情	Meng Hao	
2009	Human Love	人间情缘	Li Xiaojun	
2009	Medic	军医	Lin Bingkun	
2009	The Heavenly Sword and Dragon Saber	倚天屠龙记	Zhang Wuji	
2010	You're My Brother	你是我兄弟	Ma Xuejun	
2011	Love of Yan'an	延安爱情	Peng Chengdou	
2014	Ten Years of Love	相爱十年	Xiao Ran	
2017	Master Healing	复合大师	Mei Yangui	Special appearance

=== Variety show ===
Year	English title	Chinese title	Role	Notes
2014–2018	Keep Running	奔跑吧	Cast member/Leader	
2021	Produce Camp 2021	创造营2021	Mentor	

== Discography ==
Year	English title	Chinese title	Album	Notes
2002	"Forever Farewell"	永相别	The Young Emperor OST	
2005	"Only Need You"	只要有你	Young Justice Bao III OST	with Jin Minjia
2006	"Tian Mi Mi"	甜蜜蜜	Tian Mi Mi OST	with Sun Li
2006	"The Moon Represents My Heart"	月亮代表我的心	Tian Mi Mi OST	with Sun Li
2008	"Brothers"	兄弟	Assembly OST	
2008	"I Will Grow Up Today"	今天就长大	—N/a	Theme song of Jiayou, 2008!
2009	"Hua Xia Hero"	华夏英雄	The Heaven Sword and Dragon Saber OST	
2009	"Bloom"	绽放	—N/a	Theme song of 18th Golden Rooster Awards
2010	"A Bright Moon is Born on the Sea"	海上生明月	—N/a	Promotional song for the Shanghai World Expo
2010	"Promise"	诺言	You're My Brother OST	
2011	Xuan Yuan Legend	轩辕传奇	—N/a	Theme song for Xuan Yuan Legend game
2011	Mural	画壁	Mural OST	with Sun Li
2012	"Dreams Won't Die"	梦不死	The Four OST	
2013	"The Proverb of Love"	爱的箴言	Ten Years of Love OST	
2013	"The Story of Time"	光阴的故事	American Dreams in China OST	with Huang Xiaoming & Tong Dawei
2014	"Hello World"	—N/a	The Breakup Guru OST	
2014	"The Echoes of the Mountain Valley"	山谷里的回声	The Breakup Guru OST	
2014	"Sweet Chocolate"	—N/a	The Breakup Guru OST	
2014	"Super Hero"	超级英雄	—N/a	Theme song of Keep Running
2014	"Brahmas Lullaby"	摇篮曲	—N/a	
2015	"The Song of Little Tail"	小尾巴之歌	The Dead End OST	
2015	"Your Majesty, I Am Wrong"	娘娘我错了	Devil and Angel OST	
2015	"Alphabet Song"	字母歌	Devil and Angel OST	
2015	"Love in the World"	有情世间	Devil and Angel OST	
2016	"Undefeatable"	无敌	The Mermaid OST	
2016	"Love Song of Broadcast Station"	电台情歌	I Belonged to You OST	
2017	"Luan Mu's Wood Guitar"	乱炖的木吉他	Buddies in India OST	
2017	"Ride the Winds, Break the Waves"	乘风破浪歌	Duckweed OST	

== Accolades ==
=== Awards and nominations ===
Year	Award	Category	Nominated work	Result	Ref.
2008	29th Hundred Flowers Awards	Best Supporting Actor	Assembly	Won	
2009	27th Golden Rooster Awards	Best Supporting Actor	Assembly	Nominated	
2009	Golden Phoenix Awards	Male Actor in a Motion Picture	Assembly	Won	
2011	30th Hong Kong Film Awards	Best Supporting Actor	Detective Dee and the Mystery of the Phantom Flame	Nominated	
2013	10th Guangzhou Student Film Festival	Most Popular Actor	American Dreams in China	Won	
2015	18th Shanghai International Film Festival	Best Actor	The Dead End	Won	
2015	52nd Golden Horse Film Awards	Best Actor	The Dead End	Nominated	
2016	7th China Film Director's Guild Awards	Best Actor	The Dead End	Nominated	
2016	33rd Hundred Flowers Awards	Best Actor	The Dead End	Nominated	
2017	31st Golden Rooster Awards	Best Actor	The Dead End	Won	
2018	9th China Film Director's Guild Awards	Best Actor	Duckweed	Nominated	
2018	55th Golden Horse Film Festival and Awards	Best Leading Actor	Shadow	Nominated	
2019	25th Huading Awards	Best Actor	Shadow	Nominated	
2019	11th Macau International Movie Festival	Best Actor	Looking Up	Nominated	

=== Forbes China Celebrity 100 ===
Year	Rank	Ref.
2014	85th	
2015	27th	
2017	12th	
2019	18th	
2020	97th	
