= The Mermaid (2016 film) =

2016 Chinese-Hong Kong film by Stephen Chow

- Chinese theatrical release poster

Chinese name
- Traditional Chinese: 美人魚
- Simplified Chinese: 美人鱼
Transcriptions
Standard Mandarin
- Hanyu Pinyin: měirényú
Yue: Cantonese
- Jyutping: mei^{5} jan^{4} jyu^{4}
- Directed by: Stephen Chow
- Written by: Stephen Chow; Kelvin Lee; Andrew Fung; Ho Miu-kei; Chan Hing-kai; Lu Zhengyu; Ivy Kong; Tsang Kan-cheong
- Story by: Stephen Chow
- Based on: The Little Mermaid by Hans Christian Andersen
- Produced by: Stephen Chow; Jiang Ping; Ivy Kong
- Starring: Deng Chao; Lin Yun; Show Lo; Zhang Yuqi
- Cinematography: Choi Sung-fai
- Edited by: Cheung Ka-fai; Cheng Man-to
- Music by: Raymond Wong; Huang Fuhua; Wendy Zhang
- Production companies: China Film Group; Edko Films; The Star Overseas; Hehe (Shanghai) Pictures Co., Ltd; Beijing Enlight Pictures; Shanghai New Culture Media Group Co., Ltd; Alibaba Pictures Group Limited; Shanghai Tianshi Media Co., Ltd; BinGo Group Co., Ltd; Alpha Pictures (Hong Kong) Co., Ltd.
- Distributed by: Beijing Enlight Pictures; China Film Group Corporation
- Release date: 8 February 2016
- Running time: 94 minutes
- Countries: China; Hong Kong
- Language: Mandarin
- Budget: $60.7 million
- Box office: $553.8 million

The Mermaid (Chinese: 美人鱼) is a 2016 romantic fantasy comedy film directed, co-written and produced by Stephen Chow, which stars Lin Yun, Deng Chao, Zhang Yuqi and Show Lo. A Chinese-Hong Kong co-production, the film tells the story of a playboy businessman (Deng Chao) who falls in love with a mermaid (Lin Yun) sent to assassinate him.

The film was released in China on 8 February 2016, and broke numerous box office records, including biggest opening day and biggest single-day gross through its seventh day of release. The Mermaid had the biggest opening week of all time in China and went on to become the highest-grossing Chinese film of all time until Wolf Warrior 2 surpassed it in 2017. It was also the highest-grossing non-English, non-Hollywood film worldwide from 2016 to 2019.

A sequel is reported to have completed filming.

== Plot ==
Playboy property tycoon Liu Xuan (Deng Chao) purchases the Green Gulf, a coastal wildlife reserve, for a land reclamation project, and uses sonar technology to get rid of the sea life in the area. Unknown to him, the Green Gulf is the home of merpeople and the sonar (in addition to heavy pollution) has caused many of them to die or get sick. The few survivors live in an abandoned shipwreck in the gulf, and want to assassinate Xuan for his deeds. The merfolk send Shan (Lin Yun), a beautiful young mermaid, who has been trained to walk on her fins and hide among humans, to seduce and kill Xuan. At an extravagant party celebrating Xuan's business success, Shan, pretending to be a dancer, asks him to call her.

Xuan, believing that Shan is an escort, calls her number in order to make Ruolan (Zhang Yuqi), his business partner (and ex-girlfriend), jealous. Shan attempts to kill Xuan, but all her attempts backfire. Xuan decides to escort Shan back home, and along the way Shan takes him to a funfair where she works. While there, Shan shows Xuan there are more important things than money, and Xuan is impressed with Shan's simple, amusing antics. They spend the day together and develop feelings for each other. When Xuan finally takes Shan home, Shan quickly sends Xuan away before her people can kill him. The next day, Xuan takes Shan out on another date and proposes to her. Xuan admits that even though they only met the day before, he already knows that she is the one for him. A conflicted Shan rejects him and admits that she was sent there to kill him. Xuan kisses her, but Ruolan interrupts them. Shan runs out, and as Xuan attempts to follow her, Ruolan stops him. Angered, Xuan demands Ruolan to cancel their business deal.

That night, as Shan gets into an argument with the other merpeople, Xuan goes to Shan's house to talk to her. There, he discovers that she and her family are merpeople. Against Shan's wishes, the others capture Xuan and explain that he is killing them with his land development project. Xuan is about to be killed when Shan helps him escape. Octopus (Show Lo), one of Shan's friends, gets angry and realizes that she has fallen in love with him. Xuan returns home and, after the shock has worn off, decides to investigate the consequences of his project. He turns off the sonar but tells Ruolan that Shan is a mermaid and reveals where the other merpeople live. Ruolan tells Xuan that George, her henchman, also believes in mermaids and has been trying to find one. She is angered at Xuan's lack of affection and vows to kill Shan. Xuan tries to stop them but they dismiss him and proceed to the abandoned ship. The merpeople are attacked by Ruolan's mercenaries, and many of them are killed. The merpeople soon realize that the sonar had been turned off and return to the ocean. As Shan attempts to escape, she is shot and forced onto land. Xuan, using a jetpack, arrives in time to retrieve a badly-injured Shan. As he is carrying her to the ocean, Ruolan angrily shoots him, but George stops her before she could injure him any further. Shan insists that Xuan leave her, but he continues to carry her to safety. The police arrive and while Ruolan and George get arrested, Xuan collapses from his wounds.

Three years later, a student arrives at Xuan's home to thank him for setting up a scholarship for research into environmental protection. The student asks Xuan whether merpeople are real and if the story that he fell in love with a mermaid is true, but Xuan denies it. Xuan then introduces the student to his wife, "Lucy", who is actually Shan in a human disguise. Xuan and Shan encourage the student to travel and explore the world. The screen then goes to Xuan and Shan swimming in the ocean along with the other merpeople.

== Cast ==
- Deng Chao as Liu Xuan (刘轩), the film's main human protagonist
- Lin Yun as Shan (珊), the film's titular protagonist "The Mermaid"
- Show Lo as Octopus (八哥)
- Zhang Yuqi as Ruolan (若兰), Xuan's business partner and the film's main human antagonist
- Kris Wu as Long Jianfei, a student who sets an interview with Xuan (cameo)
- Lu Zhengyu
- Fan Shuzhen
- Li Shangzheng
- Bo Xiaolong
- Pierre Bourdaud
- Ivan Kotik as George
- Kong Lianshun (cameo)
- Bai Ke (cameo)
- Chiu Chi Ling (cameo)
- Tin Kai-man (cameo)
- Tsui Hark (cameo)
- Wen Zhang (cameo)
- Lam Chi-chung (cameo)
- Yang Neng
- Zhang Mei'e
- Jiro Lee

== Production ==
=== Inspirations ===
The story was inspired by Hans Christian Andersen's fairy tale of "The Little Mermaid" in which a mermaid loves a human, but Chow wanted to make it a modern interpretation: "I saw great creative space and development potential from the story". In another interview, Chow said: "I'm actually a big fairy-tale fan. All my previous titles can be understood as fairy tales. In the world of fairy tales, the evil are punished and the good see a happy ending. I buy that idea."

Another inspiration comes from Chow's own childhood experiences. "I lived near the sea at a young age and I looked at the sea every day. I was frightened and curious. I was very nervous when I swam in the sea and felt there might be something hidden below. I've been fascinated with the (mermaid) story since then, and I felt I could do the film, creating the concept 6 years ago and beginning to write the script four or five years ago."

=== Casting ===
==== Male lead and villain ====
Stephen Chow picked Deng Chao to play the film's lead male character Liu Xuan, even though Show Lo (who played Octopus in the film, and had previously worked with Chow in Journey to the West: Conquering the Demons) was also in the consideration. Chow explained that he ultimately chose Deng Chao for the lead role due to his overwhelming popularity in China, and he also had confidence in Deng's comedic talent, having observed his performances in the slapstick-style hit The Breakup Guru.

Zhang Yuqi first worked with Chow in CJ7 and gained fame from that role. They both later fell out in a highly publicized contractual dispute. But the personal relationship between them was not intense and Zhang once defended Chow when he was under personality attacks from former disgruntled collaborators and employees. When Zhang got a call from Chow, she was in a foreign country while her car broke down. She said yes to join the cast to play the film's villain, and described the role as a personal challenge.

==== The "Mermaid" ====
The selection of the female lead character, the "Mermaid" Shan, was one of the most publicized parts of the filming process. As reported on Oriental Daily News, the then 18-year-old actress Lin Yun was selected by Chow and his casting team from over 120,000 participants due to her demure personality in a talent contest held in Shenzhen. Reportedly, throughout the 13 casting-training period, Lin Yun caught the casting team's eyes for being calm and collected while other participants tried their hardest to steal the spotlight. According to Lin Yun, she entered the audition at her friends' recommendation, and has always admired Stephen Chow.

The mass audition was from 31 July – 15 August 2014 when everyone could submit the CVs to the website for online votes and for the casting team to choose. A total of 43 contestants were selected after the first round, and then were shortlisted to 13 finalists to participate in the final contest held on 15 September 2014. Among them, six were chosen to continue in the audition process. Lin Yun eventually won the role of the film.

=== Filming ===
The Mermaid began filming in October 2014, with shoots taking place in Shenzhen, Guangzhou, Dongguan, and in Beijing. Before the filming, confirmed cast members include Deng Chao, Show Lo, Zhang Yuqi, and newcomer Lin Yun was from a talent contest held specifically for The Mermaid in Shenzhen.

The film's production was a well-kept secret. A major set was built up in a large factory, which was used once for glass production, in Shenzhen as the shelter of mermaids in the film. Reports say that most of the scenes in his latest film have been shot more than 50 times to meet his exacting standards. Chow has even personally coached most of the cast on acting-from lead stars Deng, Zhang Yuqi and Lin Yun to Show Lo, as well as other cast members. To get the best result, Chow once let Deng Chao and Lin Yun eat 150 roasted chickens for shooting a scene. Lin Yun said Chow has never shouted at her and would often watch out for her. Playing the role of a mermaid, Lin often had to put on the safety harness when filming her underwater scenes. As she was not used to it, she often incurred injuries all over her body, and on one occasion, Yun nearly became disfigured.

Filming wrapped up in Beijing on 2 February 2015, and then went into post-production, adding visual effects by Ken Law and his Different Digital Design Ltd., as well as by MACROGRAPH，Ltd. from South Korea, both of which worked for Chow's previous film Journey to the West: Conquering the Demons.

=== Notable cameos ===
Directors Tsui Hark and Stephen Chow collaborated for the first time in The Mermaid. The two film directors had never worked together during their careers, despite each spanning three decades. Tsui Hark said they had discussed collaboration for years but Chow was so busy that Tsui had to wait until then. At a press conference in Beijing to promote The Mermaid, it was revealed that director Tsui Hark and actor Kris Wu would have cameo appearances in the film.

Other notable cameos include actor Wen Zhang, who was in Chow's previous blockbuster Journey to the West: Conquering the Demons, and the comedian duo Kong Lianshun and Bai Ke (White. K) from the popular web series Surprise, and the 2015 fantasy comedy film Surprise.

== Marketing ==
Stephen Chow was on a 20-city tour in China to promote The Mermaid, including many fan meetings. Nine companies, including China Film Group, Hehe (Shanghai) Pictures and Enlight Media, invested in the production, while four companies, Star Overseas, Hehe Pictures, Maxtimes Culture, and Union (Beijing) Pictures collaborated in terms of marketing and promotion.

On 24 May 2016, Stephen Chow, Deng Chao and Lin Yun joined Chinese government ministers in Wellington for a screening of The Mermaid as the opening of the "New Zealand China Film Week" at New Zealand's national museum to bring cultural exchange between the China and New Zealand film-making communities.

=== Trailers and "hunger marketing" ===
There were three trailers released before The Mermaid's debut. In the first trailer, the tycoon, played by Deng Chao, tells police that he has met and been kidnapped by a mermaid. In its final 90-second trailer released on 31 January 2016, it showed the love story between Liu Xuan and Shan, the two main characters, as well as the killing and hunting of the mermaids. An interesting twist and a historical link was seen in the second trailer, where there was a clue hinting at legendary Chinese mariner Zheng He's voyages in the 15th century. However, much of the storyline was kept a secret and the trailers didn't reveal too much as the marketing team held the belief to make the trailers "less amazing than the actual movie", in order to lower the hype and expectation, and so that when audiences saw the film, they would be "surprised".

Chow also adopted "hunger marketing" this time to maintain high secrecy and mystery by not letting anyone, including theater managers and film critics, see the film in advance at any premieres until it actually opened in theaters.

=== Theme song and music videos ===
The theme song of The Mermaid is titled "Invincible". The song was written and composed by Stephen Chow and performed by Deng Chao. Film score composer Raymond Wong (Shaolin Soccer, Kung Fu Hustle, CJ7 and Journey to the West: Conquering the Demons) made the arrangement, while the music producer Patrick Tsang (who produced records for Faye Wong, Eason Chan and more) mixed it. The song also has a music video in which Deng Chao sings in studio while Stephen Chow, Kris Wu and Lin Yun appear to sing the song too. Their vocals are never heard as there is only one vocal track by Deng.

Adam Cheng, Lin Yun, Stephen Chow and Karen Mok appeared at a press conference in Beijing on 18 January 2016, to release the promotional song "You Are the Best in the World" for the film. The song is Cheng and Mok's cover of the popular old song from the 1983 TV series "The Legend of the Condor Heroes." The music video of "You Are the Best in the World" shows a duet by Adam Cheng and Karen Mok with Stephen Chow adding background vocals.

=== Finance ===
A rumored deal of a two billion yuan box office guarantee was widely reported by the media. The deal would enable Chow and the film's producers to receive a huge chunk of advance income before box office grosses actually hit two billion yuan in China. If the gross eventually surpasses that figure, the distributors will take priority in collecting dividends. Yang Wei, Chairwoman of Hehe Pictures, "admitted there was such deal but she would not reveal the exact number since the details were covered by a secrecy clause in the agreement."

The "box office guarantee model" has existed for more than a decade now in the Chinese film industry. Chow's last film Journey to the West: Conquering the Demons, along with many other recent blockbuster comedies such as Breakup Buddies also used this kind of approach. It is said "The model offers not only risk control, securing the production party's interests, but also gives distributors priority in financing blockbusters-to-be, as well as showing their confidence in the films' future box office performance."

"I can confirm Hehe Pictures is the principal party of the deal and paid all the box office guarantees," Yang said.

=== Milestone posters ===
As The Mermaid has become the highest-grossing film in China, a new poster was released to mark the milestone.

== Release ==
The Mermaid was released in China on 8 February 2016. In the U.S., it was given a limited release by Sony Pictures on 19 February across 35 theaters. In the Philippines, the film was also given a limited released in theaters on 11 May 2016, simply titled Mermaid, with Columbia Pictures Philippines and Edko Films as distributors.

=== Box office ===
Buoyed by anticipation from fans as well as having the advantage of opening a day after the Chinese New Year, The Mermaid earned an opening day record of US$40.9 million, at the time this was the biggest opening day for a Chinese film and the second biggest of all time there behind the opening day of Furious 7. US$1 million came from midnight screenings. The film set a record for the fastest film to earn CN¥1 billion (US$152.4 million), doing so within four days of release, and also recorded the largest five-day gross receipts (US$187.3 million). Through its seven-day opening week, it grossed US$275.1 million, breaking records for the biggest seven-day gross and the biggest opening week of all time in China (breaking the record of Furious 7), and the third biggest of all time, behind Hollywood films Star Wars: The Force Awakens (US$390.8 million) and Jurassic World (US$296.2 million). It grossed US$120.4 million alone for the three-day opening weekend (Friday to Sunday), the biggest of all time in China and the second biggest three-day gross behind the Saturday-to-Monday gross of Furious 7. This along with From Vegas to Macau III (US$119 million) and The Monkey King 2 (US$116 million) helped the Chinese box office to break the Guinness World Record for the biggest box office week with $548 million from 8 – 14 February 2016. The previous record was set in the week of 26 December 2015 – 1 January 2016 when Star Wars: The Force Awakens led the box office with US$261 million and the box office that week totalled US$529.6 million. The previous biggest Chinese box office week had been set in July 2015 when Monster Hunt, Pancake Man, and Monkey King: Hero is Back, combined for a then total US$253 million during their first week.

On 19 February 2016 – 12 days after release – the film became the highest-grossing film in China with CN¥2.45 billion, overtaking the previous record holder, Furious 7. In its second weekend, its receipts fell by 53% to US$55.9 million from 155,704 screenings for a 14-day total of US$419.2 million. On 26 February, it was announced that The Mermaid had grossed three billion yuan (US$459 million) on its 19th day since release in mainland China. It was the first film ever to launch the three-billion-yuan club in China's film industry and set a new milestone. On 5 March, it became the first film to gross over US$500 million in China and the seventh overall in a single territory. The Mermaid grossed 3.39 billion yuan (US$525 million) in China, Due to its success, its theatrical release in China was extended to June 2016.

The film also found success outside of China, scoring the largest opening day of all time for a Chinese film both in Malaysia ($838,000) and in Singapore ($528,000). It also opened in first place in Malaysia with US$3.8 million (ahead of Deadpool) and in Vietnam with US$2 million. In Singapore it debuted in second place with US$1.6 million. In Hong Kong, The Mermaid broke the local opening day record with HK$4.96 million (US$638,352), surpassing the previous record holder Kung Fu Hustle (HK$4.42 million) which was also directed by Chow. As of 3 April 2016, it had grossed US$7.69 million there.

In the U.S., the film grossed $985,000 in its opening weekend – at an average of $28,144 per theater – making it the biggest opening weekend to date for a limited release Chinese-language film.

The Apple Daily, however, reported that Taiwan would not be releasing The Mermaid. Taiwanese quota regulations at the time permitted only ten mainland Chinese films to be released in Taiwan in any given year. Mainland Chinese movies were required to draw lots; only those with numbers 1–10 received permission. The Mermaid drew #44. This was the first time that Taiwan audiences missed a Stephen Chow film, and fans protested against Taiwan's cultural ministry about the matter.

=== Critical response ===
Response to the film was generally positive. It earned a 95% score on Rotten Tomatoes based on 37 critic reviews. The website's critical consensus reads, "The Mermaid requires a willingness to embrace the strange, but backs up its wacky flights of fancy with a big-hearted fairy tale and a resonant message." It earned a 69% score on Metacritic.

Glenn Kenny of The New York Times noted that The Mermaid is "no ordinary fantastical rom-com…encompassing as it does weaponized sea urchins, incredibly delicious roasted chickens, man-octopus self-mutilation and other comic oddities." Bilge Ebiri of New York Magazine praised the film, saying that it's "amazing how distinctive and strange Mermaid manages to be, especially given the highly derivative concept - how personal it feels, amid all the absurdist, go-for-broke humor. It deserves to be seen." Dylan Kickham of Entertainment Weekly thought the film was "at its best when embracing the ridiculous, no-holds-barred, farcical comedy that Chow had become known for, thanks to films like Kung Fu Hustle and Shaolin Soccer. From the start, and throughout the middle of the movie, Chow and his actors present a full-force farce." Simon Abrams of RogerEbert.com noted that "It doesn't matter if you don't like subtitles. It doesn't matter if you've never heard of the director. It doesn't matter if you've never seen a Chinese movie in your life. It will make you laugh. Guaranteed." South China Morning Post's film critic Ben Sin gave the film three out of five stars and described it as "a solid dramedy with heart and, more importantly, a message", though he opined that, being Chow's second film where he stayed behind the camera, it "has to be disappointing to Hongkongers". James Marsh of Screen International said that actress Lin "brings a delightfully quirky demeanour to her literal fish-out-of-water" and "the occasionally hokey CGI only adds to the film’s oddball charm." Zhang Rui of China.org.cn commented that "The film has a simple and strong message to deliver: Love can transcend race and other barriers. You could hardly expect to see such a pure fairy tale and such a clean theme in blockbusters for a long time, but Chow has done it with a pure and childlike heart." Elizabeth Kerr of The Hollywood Reporter said that "the fantastical Mermaid delivers its message without a shred of subtlety (and is unapologetic about it) but with considerable charm, wit and darkness to make up for it." MovieXclusive.com gave the film four out of five stars and said that the film "is a complete package – a stellar cast which delivers fun performances, a decent story about environmentalism, and most importantly: a barrelful of laughs guaranteed to entertain the whole family."

=== Accolades ===
List of awards and nominations
| Award | Date of ceremony | Category | Recipient(s) | Result | Ref(s) |
|---|---|---|---|---|---|
| 12th Chinese American Film Festival | 2016 | Golden Angel Award Film | The Mermaid | Won | |
| 12th Chinese American Film Festival | 2016 | Best Newcomer | Lin Yun | Won | |
| Asian Film Awards | 21 March 2017 | Best Newcomer | Lin Yun | Nominated | |
| Saturn Awards | 28 June 2017 | Best International Film | The Mermaid | Nominated | |
| Hong Kong Film Awards | 9 April 2017 | Best Film | Stephen Chow | Nominated | |
| Hong Kong Film Awards | 9 April 2017 | Best Director | Stephen Chow | Nominated | |
| Hong Kong Film Awards | 9 April 2017 | Best Screenplay | Stephen Chow | Nominated | |
| Hong Kong Film Awards | 9 April 2017 | Best Supporting Actress | Zhang Yuqi | Nominated | |
| Hong Kong Film Awards | 9 April 2017 | Best New Performer | Lin Yun | Nominated | |
| Hong Kong Film Awards | 9 April 2017 | Best Art Direction | Chan Kam Ho Raymond | Nominated | |
| Hong Kong Film Awards | 9 April 2017 | Best Original Film Song | Composer and Lyricist： Stephen Chow; Performer： Deng Chao (For the song "Invincible") | Nominated | |
| Hong Kong Film Awards | 9 April 2017 | Best Visual Effects | Ken Law; Lee In-ho; Kang Tae-gyun; Marco Ng | Nominated | |
