= 24th Golden Eagle Awards =

Chinese TV awards ceremony in 2008

The 24th Golden Eagle Awards were held August 31, 2008, in Changsha, Hunan province. Nominees and winners are listed below, winners are in bold.

== Television series ==
=== Best Television Series ===
- **Chuang Guan Dong**/**闯关东**
- Golden Marriage/金婚
- Soldiers Sortie/士兵突击
- A Dream of Youth/恰同学少年
- Gobi Mother/戈壁母亲
- Zhou Enlai in Chongqing/周恩来在重庆
- The Story of Xi Gengtian/喜耕田的故事
- Stand by Me/奋斗
- Broken the Jade/玉碎
- Jinggang Mountain/井冈山
- Xun Huisheng/荀慧生

=== Best Mini-series ===
- **The House of 72 Tenants/七十二家房客**
- Li Qingzhao/李清照
- Sword/砺剑
- Life of True Emotion/真情人生

=== Best Directing for a Television Series ===
- **Kang Honglei for Soldiers Sortie**

=== Best Writing for a Television Series ===
- **Gao Mantang for Chuang Guan Dong**

=== Best Actor in a Television Series ===
- **Li Youbin for Chuang Guan Dong**
- Wang Boqiang for Soldiers Sortie
- Lin Yongjian for The Story of Xi Gengtian
- Wang Wufu for Jinggang Mountain

=== Best Actress in a Television Series ===
- **Jiang Wenli for Golden Marriage**
- Liu Jia for Gebi Mother
- Tong Lei for Song of the Youth
- Sa Rina for Chuang Guan Dong

=== Best Art Direction for a Television Series ===
- **Zhao Hai for Ming Dynasty 1895**

=== Best Cinematography for a Television Series ===
- **Wang Bin for Chuang Guan Dong**

=== Best Lighting for a Television Series ===
- **Dai Jun for Chuang Guan Dong**

=== Favorite Actor ===
- **Wang Boqiang for Soldiers Sortie**

=== Favorite Actress ===
- **Jiang Wenli for Golden Marriage**

== Literature & Art Program ==
=== Best Literature and Art Program ===
- **2008 CCTV New Year's Gala/2008年中央电视台春节联欢晚会**
- 2008 Beijing TV New Year's Gala/2008北京新春大联欢
- The 6th Golden Eagle Awards Ceremony/第六届中国电视金鹰艺术节颁奖晚会
- 2007 Vienna New Year's Concert /2007年维也纳新年音乐会
- 2007 Dancing with Stars/2007舞林盛典
- 繁花似锦－第十届精神文明建设"五个一工程"颁奖晚会
- 感动2006——中国十大真情故事评选颁奖晚
- 鱼跃龙腾——鱼龙百戏2008新春盛宴

=== Best Directing for a Literature & Art Program ===
- **Directing group for 2008 CCTV New Year's Gala**

=== Best Cinematography for a Literature & Art Program ===
- **Cinematography group for 2008 CCTV New Year's Gala**

=== Best Art Direction for a Literature & Art Program ===
- **Jiangshan for The 6th Golden Eagle Awards Ceremony**

== Documentary ==
=== Best Television Documentary ===
- **The Nanjing Massacre/见证南京大屠杀**
- Yuanmingyuan Park/圆明园
- Saving Prisoners/囚犯生死大转移
- Six Hundred Years of Kunqu/昆曲六百年
- Song of Forest/森林之歌
- Drinking in the Same River/同饮一江水
- Finding the First Bird/寻找第一只鸟
- Tax/解读皇粮国税
- The Story of Zhou Enlai/周恩来的故事
- Artist Daolang/刀郎乐人

=== Best Writing and Directing for a Television Documentary ===
- **Writing & directing group for Ten Years of Hong Kong**

=== Best Cinematography for a Television Documentary ===
- **Cinematography group for Ten Years of Hong Kong**

== Children & Teens ==
=== Best Animation ===
- **Olympic Journal of Fuwa/福娃奥运漫游记**
- Little Carp's Adventure/小鲤鱼历险记
- Old and Young Fool/老呆和小呆
- Chinese Boy/中华小子
- Happy Father & Son/哈皮父子
- One Foot Paradise/独脚乐园

=== Best Children and Teens Program ===
- **2007 Shanghai International Children & Teens Art Festival Opening Gala/2007上海国际少年儿童文化艺术节开幕式晚会**
- Clothes of Love/爱的彩衣
- Space Journey/太空旅行团
