= Trouble Makers (2006 film) =

- Film poster
- Directed by: Cao Baoping
- Written by: Cao Baoping; Que Diwei (novella)
- Produced by: Zhang Yaoli; Sun Yang; Wang Ping; Cao Baoping
- Starring: Li Xiaobo; Kong Qingsan; Wu Gang
- Cinematography: Tao Shiwei
- Edited by: Cao Baoping
- Music by: Liu Qing
- Distributed by: Infotainment China
- Release dates: June 21, 2006 (Shanghai); June 30, 2007 (New York)
- Running time: 100 min.
- Country: China
- Language: Mandarin

Trouble Makers (simplified Chinese: 光荣的愤怒; traditional Chinese: 光榮的憤怒; pinyin: Guāngróngde fènnù; lit. 'Glorious Indignation') is a 2006 black comedy film written and directed by Cao Baoping. It was Cao's solo directorial debut, though Cao had previously co-directed the film Absolute Emotion in 2001. Based on Que Diwei's novella, "Village Operation," which was published in a magazine in 2000, Trouble Makers had difficulty traversing the Chinese censors and often found itself lacking funds until 2005. As a result, Cao eventually inserted a happy ending that differed from ending in the original novella.

== Plot ==
Trouble Makers tells the story of four simple men living in Black Well Village (in rural Yunnan province) who decide to finally run the criminal Xiong Brothers out of their homes. The Xiongs have managed to build a criminal "empire" in the small town even managing to elect themselves the mayor and official accountant of Black Well Village. Two other brothers enforce the Xiongs' will with violence and intimidation. The brothers, known by the political-infused moniker, the Gang of Four, smuggle salt and generally terrorize the villagers of Black Well.

When Ye Guangrong, the nerdy and nervous local party secretary has had enough, he rounds up several other oppressed villagers including Tugua, an account, and Dawang, whose wife was raped by one of the brothers, to clean up the village.

Guangrong and his vigilante's quickly find themselves over their heads. Hiring less than savory characters like "Dog Balls," a kung-fu obsessed buffoon, Guangrong and his men give themselves officious sounding military titles. As events spiral out of control, a confrontation between the dangerous Xiong Brothers and Guangrong's vigilantes seems inevitable.

== Cast ==
- Li Xiaobo as Xiong Brother No. 1, the eldest of the four brothers who terrorize Dragon Well Village.
- Kong Qingsan as Xiong Brother No. 2, the second eldest of the brothers, he has appointed himself as the village accountant.
- Wan Yanhui as Xiong Brother No. 3, the village's "mayor."
- Zhi Yu as Xiong Brother No. 4, the youngest of the brothers, and a spikey haired punk he serves as the brothers' enforcer.
- Wu Gang as Party Secretary Ye Guangrong, the a nervous low-level Communist official who leads the opposition to the gang
- Wang Shujun as Tugua, a cowardly accountant.
- Li Changyuan as Dawang, another villager who has been terrorized by the Xiongs
- He Yunqing as Shuigen
- Pu Xiaohu as Dog Balls, a local recruited by Guangrong who is obsessed with kung fu.

== Release ==
Trouble Makers was premiered in the small village in Yunnan where it was filmed. From there, it was screened at numerous international film festivals and received its United States Premiere at the New York Asian Film Festival on June 30, 2007. The year before, the film also premiered at several other boutique festivals, including the International Thessaloniki Film Festival, which focuses on first and second features. At the 2006 Shanghai International Film Festival, Trouble Makers won the jury prize at the Asia New Talent side-competition.
