= Xu Yigua =

Chinese writer

Xu Yigua (须一瓜) is the pen name of Xu Ping (徐苹; born 1963), a Chinese writer based in Xiamen. She writes news reports for Xiamen Evening News (厦门晚报; a local newspaper) under the name Xu Ping, and fiction under the name Xu Yigua. She found fame in the early 2000s when her fictions were featured on the covers of prominent national literary magazines, and after her real identity was discovered (to the shock of many Xiamen residents), the catchphrase "Tail-line Reporter, Headline Author" (尾条记者，头条作家) caught on.

Xu's work with Xiamen Evening News gave her extensive experience in the fields of law and government. As a result, most of her fiction deal with crimes.

Xu Yigua's 2010 novel Sunspot (太阳黑子) was adapted into a 2015 film The Dead End directed by Cao Baoping, which was a commercial and critical success.

== Works translated to English ==
Year	Chinese title	Translated English title	Translator(s)
2003	雨把烟打湿了	"The Rain Dampens the Smoke"	Ji Hua, Gao Wenxing
2003	怎么种好香蕉	"How to Grow Bananas"	Rachel Henson
2004	穿过欲望的洒水车	"The Sprinkler"	Wu Xiaozhen
2009	黑领椋鸟	"Black-Collared Starling"	Florence Woo
