= Aftershock (2010 film) =

2010 disaster-drama film by Feng Xiaogang

- Theatrical release poster
- Chinese: 唐山大地震
- Hanyu Pinyin: Tángshān Dà Dìzhèn
- Jyutping: tong4 saan1 daai6 dei6 zan3
- Directed by: Feng Xiaogang
- Screenplay by: Su Xiaowei
- Based on: Aftershock by Zhang Ling
- Produced by: Chen Kuo-fu; Zhang Dajun; Albert Lee; James Wang
- Starring: Xu Fan; Zhang Jingchu; Li Chen; Zhang Guoqiang; Chen Daoming
- Cinematography: Lü Yue
- Edited by: Xiao Yang
- Music by: Wang Liguang
- Production companies: Huayi Brothers; China Film Group; Media Asia Films; Emperor Motion Pictures
- Distributed by: Huayi Brothers
- Release date: 22 July 2010 (China)
- Running time: 135 minutes
- Country: China
- Languages: Mandarin; English
- Budget: <$25 million
- Box office: ¥665 million RMB (US$108 million)

Aftershock is a 2010 Chinese disaster-drama film directed by Feng Xiaogang and produced by Huayi Brothers, starring Xu Fan, Zhang Jingchu, Li Chen, Chen Daoming, and Zhang Guoqiang. The film is based on a novella by Zhang Ling and depicts the aftermath of the 1976 Tangshan earthquake. It was released in China on 22 July 2010, and is the first "big commercial film" IMAX film created outside the United States. The film was a major box office success, and has grossed more than ¥650 million (US$100 million) at the Chinese box office.

== Plot ==
Li Yuanni and her husband, Fang Daqiang, and their twin children, Fang Deng and Fang Da, live in a small apartment in Tangshan. In the early morning of July 28, 1976, after putting their children to bed, the couple make love in the back of their truck. An earthquake suddenly breaks out, causing buildings to crumble and disintegrate. While rushing back to save their children, Fang pulls Li back and runs ahead of her but gets instantly crushed and killed by falling debris. Their apartment block collapses and traps their children under a pile of rubble.

In the aftermath of the earthquake, a rescue team informs Li that her twins are trapped under a large slab of concrete. They tell her that lifting up the slab in any way will crush one of her children to death, so she can only choose one to save. Feeling heartbroken, Li decides to save her son, Fang Da. The girl, Fang Deng, survives and regains consciousness later to find herself among several dead bodies.

Assumed to be an orphan, Fang Deng is adopted by a military couple, Wang Deqing and Dong Guilan, who bring her back to their home in Beijing. She is renamed Wang Deng after taking on her adoptive father's surname. Ten years later, she moves away from home to study in a university in Hangzhou, where she meets a graduate student, Yang Zhi, and begins an intimate relationship with him. When Fang Deng is in her third year, her adoptive mother becomes critically ill. Before dying, she asks Fang Deng to use the money they have saved to find her biological family. Fang Deng soon finds out that she is pregnant. Despite being pressured by Yang Zhi to undergo an abortion, she refuses to do so, and secretly drops out of university, loses contact with Yang and does not return home. Wang Deqing meets with Yang Zhi and blames him for causing Fang Deng to leave.

In the meantime, Fang Da's grandmother and aunt ask him to live with them in Jinan but he ultimately remains in Tangshan with his mother. The earthquake had claimed his left arm, rendering him physically disabled. After deciding not to take the National Higher Education Entrance Examination despite his mother's insistence, Fang Da starts working as a cycle rickshaw driver, where he unknowingly gives a ride to Fang Deng's adoptive father, and eventually becomes the boss of a successful travel agency in Hangzhou. He marries and has a son, Diandian.

Four years later, Fang Deng brings along her daughter, also named Diandian, and reunites with her adoptive father. She apologises and reconciles with him. On Lunar New Year's Eve, she tells her adoptive father that she will be marrying a foreigner and will be emigrating to Vancouver with her daughter.

In 2008, Fang Deng sees the earthquake in Sichuan on television. She immediately volunteers to join the rescuers and returns to China. Fang Da has also decided to help in the rescue efforts. While taking a break, Fang Deng overhears Fang Da talking about the Tangshan earthquake and realises he is her long-lost younger twin brother. After reuniting with her younger brother, they decide to visit their mother. At first, Fang Deng is angry with her mother for abandoning her. Later, after realising the remorse, emotional agony and guilt that her mother had gone through, she forgives her mother.

The screen cuts to a stone memorial in Tangshan with the names of the victims of the earthquake.

== Cast ==
- Xu Fan as Li Yuanni, the Fang twins' mother
- Zhang Jingchu as Fang Deng
  - Zhang Zifeng as Fang Deng (child)
- Li Chen as Fang Da
  - Zhang Jiajun as Fang Da (child)
- Zhang Guoqiang as Fang Daqiang, the Fang twins' father
- Chen Daoming as Wang Deqing, Fang Deng's adoptive father
- Chen Jin as Dong Guilan, Fang Deng's adoptive mother
- Lu Yi as Yang Zhi, Fang Deng's boyfriend in university
- Lü Zhong as the Fang twins' grandmother
- Yong Mei as the Fang twins' aunt
- Wang Ziwen as Xiaohe, Fang Da's wife
- David F. Morris as Alexander, Fang Deng's husband
- Yang Lixin as Niu, the Fang family's neighbour

== Development and release ==
The film was produced by Huayi Brothers, which partnered with IMAX to produce three Chinese films (of which Aftershock is the first). In Singapore, it is distributed by Homerun Asia with Scorpio East and Golden Village Pictures.

Aftershock was released in over 5,000 conventional and 14 IMAX theaters in late July 2010. In early August 2010, the film surpassed The Founding of a Republic as the highest-grossing locally made film in China, with a RMB532 million gross.

The film was selected as the Chinese entry for the Best Foreign Language Film at the 83rd Academy Awards, but failed to make it into the final shortlist.

== Theme songs ==
- Shang Wenjie – "23 Seconds, 32 Years" (end credits)
- Faye Wong – "Heart Sutra" (just before end credits)

== Reception and awards ==
Aftershock won the Best Feature Film and Best Performance by Actor for Chen Daoming at the fourth annual Asia Pacific Screen Awards. Raymond Zhou of China Daily placed the film on his list of the best ten Chinese films of 2010. On Rotten Tomatoes the film holds a 91% rating based on reviews from 11 critics, with an average rating of 6.30/10.

The film won "Best Director" and "Best Actress" (for Xu Fan) at the 5th Huading Awards.

== See also ==
- List of submissions to the 83rd Academy Awards for Best Foreign Language Film
- List of Chinese submissions for the Academy Award for Best Foreign Language Film
