= Soldiers and Their Commander =

- Traditional Chinese: 我的團長我的團
- Simplified Chinese: 我的团长我的团
- Genre: War drama
- Created by: Huayi Brothers Media Group
- Written by: Lan Xiaolong (兰晓龙)
- Directed by: Kang Honglei (康红雷)
- Starring: Duan Yihong; Zhang Yi
- Country of origin: China
- Original language: Chinese
- No. of episodes: 43

Production
- Producer: Wu Yi (吴毅)
- Running time: 50 minutes (approx.)

Original release
- Network: Beijing TV (北京卫视); Eastern TV (东方卫视); Jiangsu TV (江苏卫视); Yunnan TV (云南卫视)
- Release: March 5, 2009

Soldiers and Their Commander (simplified Chinese: 我的团长我的团; traditional Chinese: 我的團長我的團), or My Chief and My Regiment, is a highly popular 2009 Chinese TV series produced by Huayi Brothers Media Group. The series is directed by Kang Honglei (康红雷), with Wu Yi (吴毅) as the chief producer, and is based on the novel of the same name by award-winning author Lan Xiaolong (兰晓龙). Both Kang and Lan were famous for making of the popular 2006 military drama series Soldiers Sortie.

== Story ==
The series is about the Chinese National Revolutionary Army Expeditionary Force in Burma fighting the Imperial Japanese Army during the 1942 Battle of Yunnan-Burma Road at the Second Sino-Japanese War.

The Chinese troops landed in Burma to support the British allied forces operations. The aim was to protect the road since it served as an important supply route after China's ports fell under Japanese control. When the British forces withdrew their support and surrendered, part of the remaining Chinese troops was forced to abandon their heavy equipment and retreat in loose formations through the harsh Burmese jungles, experiencing constant enemy pursue and ambush. Of the 100,000 strong Chinese Expeditionary Force sent to fight, only around 40,000 returned home.

The story follows a small group of soldiers being refuged in Yunnan, and is narrated through the eyes of a limping young Peiping student-turned-soldier named Meng Fanliao (孟烦了). After experiencing various NRA defeats during the battles of the China proper, the battle-weary soldiers had lost hope and largely forgotten by their superiors. When the 1st Burma Campaign went away, these pessimistic men from all parts of China were again conscripted into the newly regrouped "Sichuan Regiment" and airlifted into Burma. However, before they could be properly armed and supplied, a general retreat was ordered and the group was left fleeing from the enemy. Cornered and stranded, they ran into a mysterious man named Long Wenzhang (龙文章), who claimed to be a lieutenant colonel and their regiment commander. Under Long's command, the group rallied other scattered fellow troopers, regained their honor and hope, and fought back fiercely against the superior Japanese forces. Within one day and night, the encircled men drove the Japanese off a hill top and repelled 17 counterattacks, enduring constant artillery barrages and a bloody nocturnal tear gas bayonet assault, earning time for the Nu River defence to be organized.

When the only 11 survivors of the 1,000-strong regiment made it alive back to the friendly side, they were shocked to discover that Long was not their chief at all, but merely a lowly lieutenant logistics officer (the rank was achieved through bribery), who stole the insignia and uniform of a fallen commander. After court-martial, they all believed that Long was certain to be executed for the felony, but to their surprises Long was later appointed their genuine regiment chief. The new detachment was disfavored by other regular troops and was badly undersupplied, and Long's unorthodox leadership style (which upset the divisional command) only added salt to injury. The disesteemed "Cannon Fodder Regiment", as expendable "fuel of war", was then put in charge of a high-risk assault operation on a strongly fortified mountain occupied by the Japanese forces.

=== Differences between novel and TV version ===
The TV production of Soldiers and Their Commander is more-or-less faithful to Lan Xiaolong's original novelized storyline, however there are some discrepancies due to various reasons. Although some believed the novel came after the TV show, making the novel a supplement of the TV show that is abridged due to production cost and accidents.

For instance, the TV show ends with climactic Battle of the South Heaven's Gate (the mountain fortress assault), and then switches to modern times with an aged Meng Fanliao rekindling his wartime memories while walking home. The novel however, continued into the Chinese Civil War and narrated Long's suicide in defiance against orders to fight his fellow countrymen, the regiment's break-up/demise after his death, and Meng Fanliao's capture and recruitment by a young PLA soldier from a "7th Company" (implied to be the later "Steely 7th Company" of Soldiers Sortie). This part of the plot was originally considered as the final 4 episodes of the TV production, but was later scrapped. This caused great disappointment among die-hard fans as they felt that the television's ending did not do justice for the author's intention.

The final fates of many of the main characters are also changed in the TV production. Mi Long (迷龙), the squad machine gunner, survived the final battle in the TV series, but in the novel Long was forced to personally execute him for shooting a fleeing artillery commander (the nephew of an army commander) during a Japanese air raid. Zhang Lixian (张立宪), an arrogant elite from the divisional reconnaissance battalion, committed suicide after being disfigured by Japanese mustard gas, while in the novel he lived on to become a loyal member of the regiment. In the novel there are actually 22 survivors crossing the Nu River after the regiment's first last stand battle with the Japanese, but only 11 in the TV series (in both versions, one man was thought to be dead but later found alive in a grave condition). Meng's father, a pedantic old-fashioned scholar, was merely a docile civilian who surrendered to the Japanese in order to preserve his precious book collection, in the novel he actually went further and became a Japanese puppet (a proxy village supervisor) and was committing the treacherous act of keeping a comfort woman for the invaders. Some of the characters from the original novel was also omitted to unnamed supporting characters in the TV series.

== Cast ==
Cast members:

- Duan Yihong as Long Wenzhang ("shira shira")
- Zhang Yi as Meng Fanliao ("Fan La")
- Zhang Guoqiang as Zhang Milong
- Xing Jiadong as Yu Xiaoqing
- Li Chen as Zhang Lixian
- Wang Dazhi as Deng Bao ("Bu La/not spicy")
- Wang Xun as Li Sifu ("Yao Ma")
- Wang wang as Lin Yi ("A Yi")
- Luo Jingmin as Hao Xichuan ("Vet")
- Gao Jin as Kang Huolian ("Kang Ya")
- Fan Lei as Ma Dazhi ("Snake Butt")
- Xie Mengwei as Gu Xiaomai ("Bean Cake")
- Wang Dongdong as Dong Dao ("Jinx")
- Zhang Hengping as Cui Yong ("Big Beard")
- Liu Tianzuo as Shi Xiaomao ("Krupp")
- Du Jianqiao as Li Liansheng ("Li Wula")
- Su Yujie as Xing Fuquan
- Bai En as "Sheep Ball"
- Ma Xiaoyun as "Man Han"
- He Jie as "Mud Egg"
- Liu Weiwei as Shangguan Jieci
- Yuan Fei as Chen Xiaozui
- Jiang Qihan as Lei Bao' er
- Li Hongliang as Li Liang (red youth, "little bookworm", "little ant")
- Shi Hang as "Venerable Shi Hang"
- Wu Youcai as Meng's father
- Khaschichige as Meng's mother
- Zhao Zhijun as Tang Ji
- Li Jing as Director Chen
- Zhang Hanbing as Yu Shenqing
- Wang Daqi as He Shuguang
- Zuo Tengyun as Yu Zhi
- Cao Haitao as Hai Zhengchong
- Chen Sicheng as Mi Qi (Head of the rescue team) ("mishi mishi")
- Li Bo as Cheng Xiaolong
- Diao Haiming as Xing Jiuhong
- Deng Bao as the head of the shelter
- Karl Eiselen as Arthur McLuhan ("Master Mc")
- Jonathan Kos-Read as Alger Collins ("Assistance") (from a word on blood chit)
- Lan Xiaolong as Takeuchi Renzan (Japanese commander) (Photo)
- Yang Zaijing (veteran of the Expeditionary Force) as Meng in old age

== Inspiration ==
Director Kang Honglei, instead of feeling joyful after the run-away success of Soldiers Sortie, became very worried that this would be his career apogee (and hence the start of downfall). He began looking for new ideas for his upcoming productions. In early 2007, Kang set his eyes on The Stilwell Papers, the compiled journal of Joseph Stilwell during the American general's time in China as the Allied commander. Kang was immediately interested in the Yunnan-Burma theatre of the struggle against Imperial Japan, as the fighting in southwestern China was often neglected in modern Chinese history textbooks.

Kang, together with his friend Lan Xiaolong, travelled to Yunnan in April 2007, visiting local war museums, soldiers' cemeteries and interviewing many aged surviving veterans. They were shocked by the sheer numbers of casualties and sacrifices, and was ashamed of their own lack of knowledge in that part of history. Lan reportedly broke down in tears after returning to his hotel. Feeling owing to the unnamed fallen heroes, Kang decided that his next TV production will be focused on NRA's Yunnan battlefront. One year later, Kang led a 200-man production team to Yunnan, and spent over 6 months shooting the series. Kang insisted his team to work in the most harsh environment in order for the actors to experience the harsh reality of battlefield. Many actors later stated that the time in Yunnan was like "fighting a war" and a few had openly claimed the decision not to act in any war dramas in the near future.

The final battle in Soldiers and Their Commander was directly inspired by the Battle of Mount Song in 1944, the largest campaign in southwestern China during the Second World War. The Chinese casualties in that battle numbered in the rank of over 20,000. The series presented an alternative outcome of the battle (Long's attack squad infiltrated the Japanese tunnel system and disrupted the enemy lines), but the sand table battle in Episode 31 to 33 is actually a true depiction of what really happened (a Chinese frontal assault that was repeatedly ambushed, causing heavy casualty).

== Airing chaos and rating war during initial broadcast ==
The promotion of Soldiers and Their Commander was nothing short of extravagant. The series enjoyed high expectations from die-hard fans of Soldiers Sortie as the hyped "sister production" of the latter (almost the entire cast from Soldiers Sortie returned for major roles or cameo appearances). The series was purchased at a record-high price of over 1 million yuan per episode for the initial round of airing by 4 major provincial satellite TV stations — Beijing, Shanghai, Jiangsu and Yunnan, in agreement that all will air the series on March 2, 2009. In late February, Beijing TV requested postponing the airing to March 9 due to clashes of slots with its current-running drama series, drawing complaints from other stations. After much negotiating, the stations agreed that none will air the series prior to March 5.

Jiangsu TV then announced that it will begin the series in a commercial-free timeslot at 12 am sharp on March 5, exploiting a loophole in the agreement. The 3-episode midnight run set an all-time record in terms of ratings, and successfully established Jiangsu TV a head-start against its competitors. To maintain that advantage, Jiangsu TV then proceeded to run 2 episodes per day as agreed, followed by an unprecedented 11-episode re-run during the following weekend.

The other stations then scrambled to catch up, but restricted by the "2 episodes per day" agreement, resorted to various unusual (sometimes unethical) strategies. Yunnan TV for instance, introduced the "24-hour rolling" airing dedicated to the show. Eastern TV (Shanghai TV) in particular, shortened 3 episodes into 2 by deleting scenes in order to speed up the broadcast, leading to frustration among viewers. The rumor then came that Eastern TV declined payment to the series' distributor as it claimed others had violated the airing agreement. The subsequent verbal sparring and disruption of normal programming eventually led to the intervention of SARFT and signing of a new regulation by all TV stations across the country.

Ironically, the money/rating-centric attitude of the TV stations only served to their disfavor, as annoyed viewers were deterred away causing the TV ratings to drop. The series however was very successful in DVD sales, and set records to online streaming as well as peer-to-peer downloads on major websites such as Youku and Tudou. The series' original novelized screenplay also sold exceptionally well.

The series is currently due for the 2nd-round airing by another 4 provincial satellite TV networks — Zhejiang, Shandong, Hebei and Sichuan. The 3rd-round airing will be done by Guangdong TV after the 2nd round.

== Accidents during production ==
On April 8, 2008, while shooting battle scenes, the chief firework technician Guo Yan (郭岩) and 2 of his assistants were caught in a blast when nearby live-charges accidentally exploded. Guo was fatally hit in the chest by a flying shrapnel. The incident was a huge blow to the crew, and the production was halted for a week.

On April 20, a temporary hut built on a local bridge collapsed on set. Falling debris injured up to 50 civilian actors who were recruited for a crowd scene. No fatalities were reported. Though the production was not delayed, a large amount of compensation was paid, driving up the production cost.

== Receptions and complaints ==
Soldiers and Their Commander received polarized receptions from TV audiences. Many rated the series highly, calling it "a milestone in Chinese TV productions" for the innovative break-away from the traditional style of war dramas. The series' recreation of realistic battlefields was also praised by the majority audience. The series' die-hard fans, known as "Chief fans" (团粉), often considered themselves "suffering from the Chief addiction (团毒)" that made them distasted to other politically "glorified" but unrealistic mainstream war dramas. However, some viewers disliked the series' portrayal of the war-fatigued soldiers, criticizing the dirty and undisciplined appearance as "eyesores". The series was also branded a "divide" as many felt marginalized by the series' complex straight play-style dialogues. Some viewers experienced difficulty in understanding dialogues and the messages they conveyed, and often had to go and consult the novel.

Many netizens in China have complained about 3 seconds of footage that seemed to be copied straight from the 2001 American movie Pearl Harbor, particularly the aerial combat scenes where specific aircraft are being analyzed and modified to fit into the series' 3D special effects.

Some viewers complained about the military equipment in the show being like a "mixing pot", as the regiment was equipped with weapons and helmets varying from British, French, German, to Japanese and American, not typical of NRA soldiers, who were usually thought to be American-trained and equipped. The TV series actually portrayed history faithfully as the 1st Burmese Expedition of 1942 were organized mainly from former local Chinese warlords from Yunnan, Sichuan and Guangxi provinces, whose military equipment varied greatly. The series' dedicated regiment was also defined as a delinquent group neglected and disliked by their superiors, and hence scavenged any utilities they could find, while the elite elements of NRA was portrayed as either German or American-equipped. In fact, the production team used real weapons from local war museums that fired blank rounds for sense of realism.

Some viewers also criticized one particular scene where NRA soldiers surround and bash a Japanese Type 95 Ha-Go tank with dadaos and buttstocks, calling the scene as "ridiculous" and "degrading to fallen soldiers". However, this is historically factual as many National Revolutionary Army soldiers (especially those from local armed forces) were illiterate conscripts who had never seen tanks previously. The NRA also lacked sufficient anti-tank weapons, leaving its troopers often resort to desperate and extreme measures to fight against the enemy. One Japanese painting named "The desperate fight of the mini-tank" specifically portrayed Chinese soldiers charging a stalled tank with their bayonets.

The series has received several minor awards after its release, and is ranked 3rd of all television series released in Mainland China during 2009 by various entertainment journals. It was nominated for "Best Screenplay", "Best Director", "Best Leading Actor" and "Gold Award" at the 15th Shanghai Television Festival.

== See also ==
- Soldiers Sortie
- commons:China Burma India Theater of World War II
- commons:Sun Li-jen
- commons:China Expeditionary Force
- commons:Chinese Army in India
- commons:Salween River Bridge
- commons:Merrill's Marauders
- commons:Flying Tigers
