= Across the Furious Sea =

- Theatrical release poster
- Simplified Chinese: 涉过愤怒的海
- Hanyu Pinyin: Shèguò fènnù dì hǎi
- Directed by: Cao Baoping
- Screenplay by: Cao Baoping; Wu Pipi; Jiao Huajing
- Based on: Across the Furious Sea by Lao Huang
- Produced by: Dong Chenchen; Cao Baoping; Zheng Zhihao
- Starring: Huang Bo; Zhou Xun; Zu Feng; Zhang Youhao; Zhou Yiran
- Cinematography: Li Ran
- Edited by: Yan Yiping
- Music by: Guo Sida
- Production companies: Chenming Film Industry (Shanghai) Co., Ltd. Beijing Standard Image Culture Communication Co., Ltd.
- Distributed by: China Film Group Corporation
- Release date: November 25, 2023
- Running time: 144 minutes
- Country: China
- Languages: Mandarin; Japanese
- Box office: $76.4 million

Across the Furious Sea (Chinese: 涉过愤怒的海) is a 2023 Chinese neo-noir crime thriller film directed and co-written by Cao Baoping, and starring Huang Bo, Zhou Xun, Zu Feng, Zhang Youhao and Zhou Yiran. The film was adapted from the novel by Lao Huang of the same name published in Fiction Monthly. It is the last instalment of Cao's "Heartburn trilogy" following The Dead End (2015) and The Perfect Blue.

Across the Furious Sea is also the first live-action domestic film in the history of mainland China's film industry to feature an age rating label mandated by the National Film Administration, in accordance with the Film Industry Promotion Law. It was released theatrically in China on November 25, 2023.

== Plot ==
Jin (Huang Bo), a Chinese fishing trawler captain, travels to Kyoto after learning that his daughter, Nana (Zhou Yiran), a student at Kyoto University, has gone missing. Following the discovery of Nana's body, the autopsy reveals that she was gang-raped and stabbed non-fatally, leading to her death from blood loss. Jin confronts Miaomiao (Zhang Youhao), Nana's boyfriend, but Miaomiao evades him and flees to China.

In China, Jin attempts to locate Miaomiao, who is being hidden by his mother, Jing Lan (Zhou Xun). Jing, who is trying to secure a German visa for Miaomiao, misleads Jin while hiding her son in a safe house. However, Miaomiao escapes to a cosplay convention, leading to a pursuit by Jin. The chase ends with both men falling onto an inflatable figurine, after which Miaomiao hides at his father's mansion. Jing locks Jin in the mansion's basement, but as police arrive, Jin escapes by setting a fire and is saved from smoke inhalation by Jing.

A car chase ensues during a storm as Jing drives to the airport to meet Miaomiao. A collision occurs, leaving everyone but Jin incapacitated. Jin kidnaps Miaomiao and refuses to reveal his location, bargaining for three days' freedom to attend Nana's funeral in Kyoto. There, Jin tracks down and kills or injures the three students involved in Nana's assault. Upon his return, Jin reveals evidence of Miaomiao's betrayal of Nana and claims to have killed him. Jing attempts suicide but is saved by Jin, leading her to refuse to testify against him, forcing the police to drop the charges.

It is later revealed that Miaomiao's father harbors resentment towards him due to an accident that injured his younger sister, exacerbated by a recent prank that caused further harm. The Japanese police conclude that Nana's wounds were self-inflicted and that her death was a result of her emotional distress, exacerbated by Miaomiao's rejection.

In the final scene, Jin releases a still-alive Miaomiao, whom he had kept chained in a lighthouse. Jin is later convicted for kidnapping and breaking into the mansion, Miaomiao for injuring his sister, and Officer Dai for mishandling the case. After serving his sentence, Jin donates the proceeds from selling his trawler to a charity for adolescent mental health.

== Cast ==
- Huang Bo as Jin Yunshi or Lao Jin (Jin Lina's father)
- Zhou Xun as Jing Lan (Li Miaomiao's mother)
- Zu Feng as Li Lie (Li Miaomiao's father and Jing Lan's ex-husband)
- Zhang Youhao as Li Miaomiao
- Zhou Yiran as Jin Lina
- Yan Ni as Gu Hong (Jin Lina's mother and Jin Yunshi's ex-wife)
- Yan Bei as Dai Zhen
- Wang Sun as Lao Qin
- Sun Anke as Shen Xiaolin
- Tsuyoshi Abe as Shimazu
- Kira Shi as Wu Weiwei
- Tizzy T as the boy

== Production ==
=== Background ===
The film is adapted from Lao Huang's novel of the same name, which tells the story of a father's crazy revenge after his daughter was murdered, and is the third part of Cao Baoping's "Heartburn (灼心) trilogy" following The Dead End and The Perfect Blue. The film marked the first collaboration between Zhou Xun and Huang Bo, which is also the reunion of Cao and Zhou after 12 years since The Equation of Love and Death.

Filming took place in Dalian, Liaoning on July 8, 2019.

The water scenes of the film were shot at the Underwater Production Center located in The Oriental Movie Metropolis Film and Television Industrial Park. During the filming of these scenes, the director utilized three underwater viewfinders to observe and make necessary adjustments to the underwater shots. During the filming process, Huang Bo engaged in extensive shooting at sea and portrayed a wide range of emotional fluctuations. To fully embody the role and immerse himself in the character, Huang underwent a period of immersion in Dalian prior to filming. He visited a seaside fishing village, engaged in conversations with various captains, accompanied fishermen on fishing trips, and familiarized himself with the equipment aboard the ships.

=== Promotion ===
On September 16, 2020, the film was included in Huayi Brothers Pictures' "Project H" Season 7 film list of the 5 major chapters of the "Human Fireworks".

On November 17, 2023, all the cast, crew and stars gathered at the first premiere of the film in Beijing.

== Reception ==
=== Box office ===
Across the Furious Sea was a box office success and proved to be a popular film upon its release.

On November 25, 2023, the film grossed over CN¥100 million. By November 27, the box office had exceeded CN¥200 million. By November 30, the film's box office reached CN¥250 million. By December 2, the total box office of the film surpassed CN¥320 million. By December 9, "Across the Furious Sea" had been released for 15 days, and the total box office exceeded CN¥500 million. On December 21, Across the Furious Sea grossed CN¥547 million and surpassed the 12.92 million admissions mark at the Chinese box office, ranking first in the box office for the time of release.

Overall, Across the Furious Sea grossed a total of CN¥549 million from China alone.

=== Critical response ===
John Berra of Screen Daily, describing it as "one of the most relentless Chinese thrillers in recent memory" and he also especially praised the "riveting performances" from Huang Bo and Zhou Xun.

=== Awards and nominations ===
Year	Award	Category	Recipients	Result
2024	15th China Film Director's Guild Awards	Best Film	Across the Furious Sea	Nominated
2024	15th China Film Director's Guild Awards	Best Director	Cao Baoping	Won
2024	15th China Film Director's Guild Awards	Best Screenwriter	Cao Baoping, Wu Pipi, Jiao Huajing	Nominated
2024	15th China Film Director's Guild Awards	Best Actor	Huang Bo	Nominated
2024	15th China Film Director's Guild Awards	Best Actress	Zhou Xun	Won
2024	15th China Film Director's Guild Awards	Best Actress	Zhou Yiran	Nominated
2024	19th Changchun Film Festival	Best Film	Across the Furious Sea	Nominated
2024	19th Changchun Film Festival	Grand Jury Prize	Across the Furious Sea	Nominated
2024	19th Changchun Film Festival	Best Director	Cao Baoping	Nominated
2024	19th Changchun Film Festival	Best Screenwriter	Cao Baoping, Wu Pipi, Jiao Huajing	Won
2024	19th Changchun Film Festival	Best Actor	Huang Bo	Nominated
2024	19th Changchun Film Festival	Best Actress	Zhou Xun	Nominated
2024	19th Changchun Film Festival	Best Cinematography	Li Ran	Nominated
2024	19th Changchun Film Festival	Best Editing	Yan Yiping	Nominated
2024	19th Changchun Film Festival	Best Music	Guo Sida	Nominated
2025	31st Shanghai Film Critics Awards	Film of Merit: Top 10 Films	Across the Furious Sea	Won
