= Devil and Angel =

- Poster
- Chinese: 恶棍天使
- Directed by: Yu Baimei; Deng Chao
- Starring: Deng Chao; Sun Li
- Production companies: Beijing Enlight Pictures; Tianjin Chengzi Yingxiang Media; Shanghai Huixing Huiying Entertainment Studio
- Distributed by: Beijing Enlight Media
- Release date: 24 December 2015
- Country: China
- Language: Mandarin
- Box office: US$99.2 million

Devil and Angel (Chinese: 恶棍天使) is a 2015 Chinese comedy film directed by Yu Baimei and Deng Chao and starring Deng Chao and Sun Li. It was released in China on 24 December 2015.

== Plot ==
Because of a car accident, the high-IQ and low-EQ girl Cha Xiaodao accidentally met the villain Mo Feili who was a full-time debt collector. Cha Xiaodao was blackmailed by Mo Feili and became depressed. Thinking back to the time when she broke off relations with her mother and was fired by her boss, she became even more desperate. By chance, Cha Xiaodao saw an advertisement for the doctor who specialized in treating difficult and complicated psychological diseases. She was desperate and decided to go to the doctor for help. Unexpectedly, she met the villain Mo Feili again in the clinic. Panicked, Cha Xiaodao was afraid to see the villain Mo Feili, but she didn't expect that the doctor who was eager to divert his attention would introduce her to Mo Feili, who suffered from severe insomnia, as a "medicine". The doctor also told Cha Xiaodao that Mo Feili was also a "medicine" that could cure her psychological problems. Cha Xiaodao, who dispelled his doubts, was eager to try. And because of this, the two people with different personalities became partners. One of them was extremely arrogant and domineering, and the other was extremely cowardly and timid. A series of stories of laughter and tears happened in the process of debt collection.

== Cast ==
- Deng Chao as Mo Feili
- Sun Li as Zha Xiaodao
- Dai Lele
- Liang Chao as Zhe Ergen
- Yang Xinming
- Wang Yanhui

== Reception ==
The film grossed US$55 million on its opening weekend in China.

Maggie Lee of Variety described the film: "Husband-and-wife leads Deng Chao and Betty Sun Li star as debt collectors in this hyper but effective Chinese comedy"
