= Duckweed (film) =

- Film poster
- Chinese: 乘风破浪
- Directed by: Han Han
- Written by: Han Han
- Produced by: Xu Zheng; Yu Dong; Li Wenwen
- Starring: Deng Chao; Eddie Peng; Zhao Liying; Dong Zijian
- Cinematography: Zhiyuan Chengma
- Music by: Fei Peng
- Production company: Shanghai Professional Making Film
- Distributed by: Shanghai Bona Media Co., Ltd. Horgos Orange Picture Media Co., Ltd.
- Release date: 28 January 2017 (China)
- Running time: 102 minutes
- Country: China
- Language: Mandarin
- Box office: US$151.5 million

Duckweed (Chinese: 乘风破浪; lit. Ride the Winds, Break the Waves) is a 2017 Chinese comedy drama directed by Han Han and starring Deng Chao, Eddie Peng, Zhao Liying and Dong Zijian. It was released on 28 January 2017.

== Plot ==
The film tells the story about the reconciliation between race car driver, Ah Lang, and his emotionally estranged father, Ah Zheng. After a fateful occurrence, Ah Lang is given the opportunity to travel back in time and re-meet his father in the past.

The film starts with Xu Tailang (Ah Lang) winning the 2022 China Rally Championship as his aging father, Xu Zhengtai (Ah Zheng) watches. Following this, while taking his father for a speed drive, a risky maneuver results in a devastating collision with an oncoming train. As Ah Lang fades in and out of conscious on the hospital gurney, he is suddenly transported back in time to 1998, to the town where he was born. A chance encounter with a mugger results in a younger Ah Zheng, now the same age as Ah Lang, swooping in to Ah Lang's rescue. Ah Zheng is oblivious to Ah Lang's true identity, and quickly claims Ah Lang as his new brother-in-arms.

Thus begins Ah Lang's comical adventures with the young Ah Zheng, Ah Zheng's ragtag gang, and various other people of that era that Ah Lang never had the chance to know, including Ah Lang's mother, who committed suicide from postpartum depression shortly after he was born. Through it all, Ah Lang is able to befriend the charismatic, headstrong Ah Zheng from the past, witness the love between him and Ah Lang's mother, and learn what happened in the intervening years that turned Ah Zheng into the quiet, estranged man that Ah Lang knew growing up.

== Cast ==
- Deng Chao as Xu Tailang
- Eddie Peng as Xu Zhengtai
- Zhao Liying as Xiao Hua
- Dong Zijian as Xiao Ma
- Zack Gao as Liu Yi
- Zhang Benyu as Luo Li
- Li Ronghao as Huang Zhiqiang
- Mason Lee as Ah Jun
- Chin Shih-chieh (credited as King Shihchieh) as Director Jin
- Fang Li as Bath Center Boss
- Alice Xiong as Jia Yi
- Sun Yihan as Song Zi
- Li Chunai as Xiao Chun

== Critical reception ==
The film received positive reviews both in China and internationally. On Rotten Tomatoes it has a score of 83% based on reviews from six critics. Maggie Lee of Variety reported "More relaxed and carefree than any of the Lunar New Year blockbusters jostling for the holiday crowd, the film is sprinkled with witty grace notes and is crowd-pleasing without being too ingratiating or idiotic."

== Box office ==
The film became one of the highest grossing Chinese films of the year, making one billion yuan in less than one month after being released.

== Awards and nominations ==
Awards	Category	Recipient	Result	Ref.
37th Hong Kong Film Awards	Best Film from Mainland and Taiwan	Duckweed	Nominated	
9th China Film Director's Guild Awards	Best Film	Duckweed	Nominated	
9th China Film Director's Guild Awards	Best Director	Han Han	Nominated	
9th China Film Director's Guild Awards	Best Young Director	Han Han	Nominated	
9th China Film Director's Guild Awards	Best Actor	Deng Chao	Nominated	
9th China Film Director's Guild Awards	Best Actor	Eddie Peng	Nominated	
9th China Film Director's Guild Awards	Best Actress	Zhao Liying	Nominated	
23rd Huading Awards	Best Screenwriter	Han Han	Nominated	
