= Li Chen (actor) =

Chinese actor

- 李晨
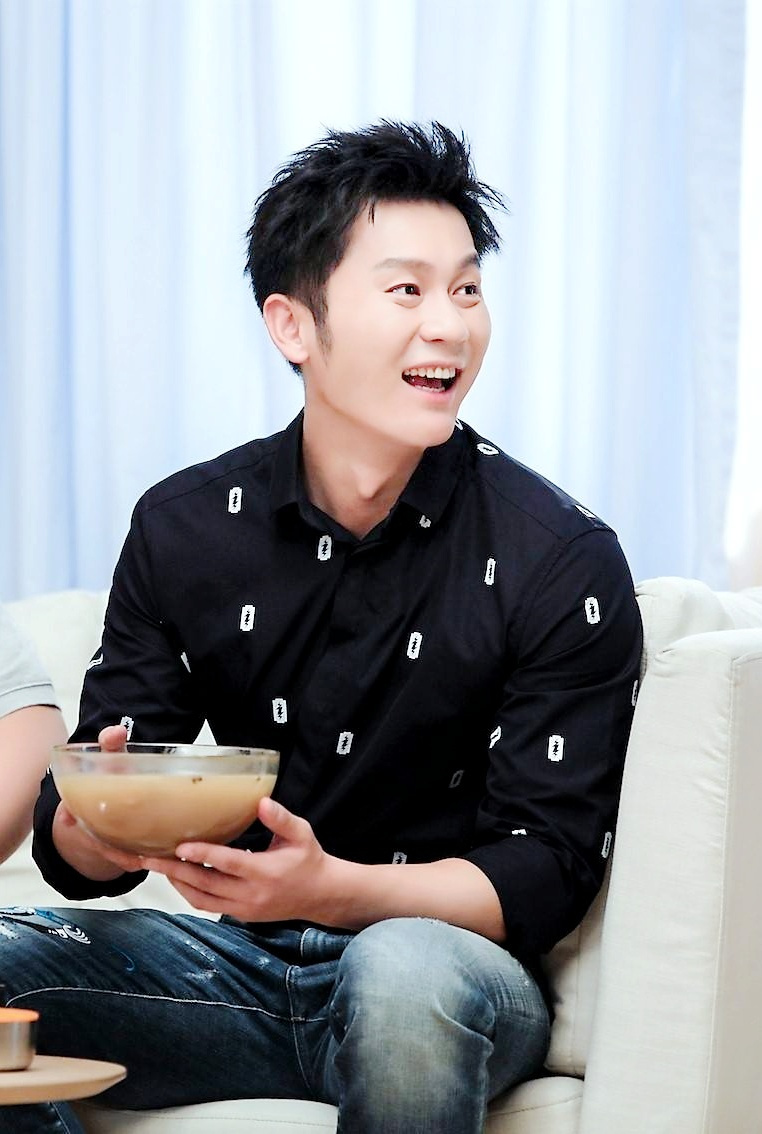
- Li in 2017
- Born: 24 November 1978 (age 47); Beijing, China
- Other name: Jerry Li
- Education: Beijing Qunxing Biaoyan Art School
- Occupations: Actor; Singer; Television personality; Film director
- Years active: 1997–present
- Agent: Huayi Brothers

Chinese name
- Simplified Chinese: 李晨
Transcriptions
Standard Mandarin
- Hanyu Pinyin: Lǐ Chén

Li Chen (Chinese: 李晨, born 24 November 1978), also known as Jerry Li, is a Chinese actor and director. He is a cast member and leader of the popular variety program, Keep Running. Li is also known for his roles in the television series Beijing Love Story (2012), Beijing Youth (2012) and The Good Fellas (2016); as well as films Ultimate Rescue (2008), which won him the China Movie Channel Media Awards and Aftershock (2010). Li made his directorial debut in 2017 with Sky Hunter.

== Career ==
Li made his acting debut in the 1997 television series, Seventeen Year-Olds Don't Cry, and was remembered for his role as a young, energetic and pure boy. Li's career went quiet for several years, during which time he embarked on several unsuccessful business ventures and flirted with the idea of becoming a racing car driver. In 2002, under the recommendation of his mentor Lü Liping, Li got the role of Qi Beile in the palace romance drama 13th Princess and started to re-gain attention. Though the drama wasn't a huge success, Li got attention for his performance and was subsequently cast in several productions. In 2006, he rose to fame again for his performance in the 2006 drama Soldiers Sortie, and was signed onto Huayi Brothers. Li was then cast in the film Assembly (2007) by Feng Xiaogang.

In 2008, Li starred in the television film Ultimate Rescue where played a rough-edged taxi driver who is caught in the thick of a spontaneous rescue mission, and was widely praised for his realistic portrayal. Li was nominated at the International Emmy Awards for Best Actor, and won the Best Newcomer award at the China Movie Channel Media Awards. He continued his upward trajectory with several high profile films and television series including My Chief and My Regiment (2009) and Aftershock (2010); his performance in the latter resonated with the audience and earned him a nomination for Best Supporting Actor at the Hundred Flowers Awards.

Li then co-starred in the romantic drama Beijing Love Story (2012), which he also acts as producer. The series was popular during its run, recording 1 billion views and had a cult following online. The same year, he starred in Beijing Youth, the third installment of Zhao Baogang's Youth trilogy. The drama won positive reviews all-round for its realistic portrayal of youth. Li experienced a surge in popularity, and was named 'Artist of the Year' at the China TV Drama Awards.

In 2014, Li became a cast member of the variety program Keep Running, which had explosive popularity in China and launched Li into a household name.

Li then co-starred in war drama The Good Fellas, which he also acts as the creator cum executive producer. The series was filmed back in 2013, but only got its release in 2016. Li's efforts paid off, and The Good Fellas won the Best Television Series award at the Shanghai Television Festival.

In 2017, Li starred in the historical drama The Advisors Alliance, playing Cao Pi. The same year, he launched his directorial debut, Sky Hunter, which is China's first aerial warfare film.

In 2018, Li was cast in the action thriller drama Seven Days.

== Personal life ==
On 16 September 2017, Li and actress Fan Bingbing were engaged after Li proposed to Fan at her birthday party. The couple announced their separation on 27 June 2019.

In January 2021, Li opened a high-end bar in Sanya, China.

== Filmography ==
=== Films ===
Year	English title	Chinese title	Role	Notes/Ref.
1997		花季·雨季	Wang Xiaotian	
1998		岁岁平安	Zhao Gen	
2000		从冰点到沸点	Yang Tao	
2001		青春子弹	Qing Tong	
2001		玫瑰黑客	Yao Xiaolei	
2003	Sky of Love	情牵一线	Student	Cameo
2003		危险少女	Guan Xiaoyang	
2004		花烛错	Yan Jun	Television film
2004		珍珠衫	Jiang Xingge	
2005		终极游戏	Qiao Ran	
2006	On the Wings of an Angel	天使的翅膀	Li Xiaoyao	
2006	Boy Rush Out	男孩向前冲	He Xiaofeng	
2006	Assembly	集结号	Liu	Cameo
2007		沉默的较量	Lei Xiaoyu	
2008	Ultimate Rescue	极限救援	Liu Wu	Television film
2008	Desires of the Heart	桃花运	Guan Xiang	
2008		立正	Xiao Le	
2008	The Shaft	地下的天空	Song Daming	
2009	Six Sisters in the War	沂蒙六姐妹	Han Dazhuang	
2010	Aftershock	唐山大地震	Fang Da	
2010	Watch Out for the Bear	熊出没注意	Sha Li	
2010	Love on Lushan Mountain	庐山恋	Ma Jiang	
2010	If You Are the One 2	非诚勿扰2	Celebrity	Cameo
2010	Struggle	奋斗	Lu Tao	
2011	Yang Shan-zhou	杨善洲	Zhou Bo	
2011	The Founding of a Party	建党伟业	Zhang Guotao	
2011	Love is Not Blind	失戀33天		Cameo
2013	Saving General Yang	忠烈楊家將	Yang Yanhui	
2014	Breakup Buddies	心花路放	Rich Playboy	Cameo
2015	Running Man	奔跑吧！兄弟	Himself	
2015	Let's Get Married	咱们结婚吧	Li Xiang	
2015	Chronicles of the Ghostly Tribe	九层妖塔	President Wang	
2016	MBA Partners	梦想合伙人	Jun Cheng	
2016	When Larry Met Mary	垚知马俐		Cameo
2016	I Am Not Madame Bovary	我不是潘金莲	Police	Cameo
2017	Sky Hunter	空天猎	Wu Di	Also director
2018	The Faces of My Gene	祖宗十九代	Zhang Baishun	
2020	The Eight Hundred	八佰	Shandong Soldier	
2020	My People, My Homeland	我和我的家乡	Jiang Wenhao	
2020	749 Bureau	749局		
2021	Never Stop	超越	Niu Tieju	
2021	The Battle at Lake Changjin	长津湖	Yu Congrong	
2022	The Battle at Lake Changjin II	长津湖之水门桥	Yu Congrong	
2023	Never Say Never	谢理事	Director Xie	
2023	The Third Squad		Yang Jiantao	
2024	A Legend	傳奇	Lei Zhen	
2025	Operation Hadal	蛟龙行动	Zhou Peilin	
2026	Vanishing Point	消失的人	Lin Wenzhao	
2026	Crossing	四渡	Wu Qiwei	

=== Television series ===
Year	English title	Chinese title	Role	Notes/Ref.
1997	Seventeen Year-Olds Don't Cry	十七岁不哭	Jian Ning	
1998	Working Diary	打工日记	Qing Miao	
1998		你在哪里逗留	Hu Ke	
1999		刑警本色	Mei Ying	
2002	Only You	非你不可	Da Zhong	
2003	13th Princess	十三格格	Qi Beile	
2003		歌唱	Cao Huoxing	
2003		生命因你而美丽	Du Yuan	
2004	Suddenly Turn Hostile	变脸	Shen Han	
2005	The Clock is Ticking	危情24小时	Fang Jin	
2005	The Vinegar Tribe	醋溜族	Ah Hua	Cameo
2005		离婚官司	Wang Ziyi	Cameo
2005	The Phantom Lover	夜半歌声	Zhuo Nan	Cameo
2006		一针见血	Fan Dong	
2006	May Flower	五月的鲜花	Zhou Beiji	
2006	Soldiers Sortie	士兵突击	Wu Zhe	
2007		有多少爱可以重来	Jiang Bei	
2008	Top-secret Escort	绝密押运	Lu Tao	
2009	My Chief and My Regiment	我的团长我的团	Zhang Lixian	
2009	The Line	生死线	Long Wenzhang	
2010		孽缘	Li Baoquan	
2010	Shrimp Preach	虾球传	Xia Qiu	
2011	Windmill	风车	Liang Chen	
2011	Barber	理发师	Lu Pingsheng	
2012	Beijing Love Story	北京爱情故事	Wu Di	also producer
2012	Beautiful Day	风和日丽	Liu Shijun	
2012	My Best Sidekick	我的非常闺密	Qiao Ni	Cameo
2012	Beijing Youth	北京青年	He Dong	
2012	Hot Girls	麻辣女兵	Chen Xiong	Cameo
2013	Marry to Love	嫁给爱情	Ma Mingyu	
2013	Angel is Coming	今夜天使降临		Sun Jiacheng
2013	The Distance to Love	到爱的距离	Li Rui	also producer
2014	Divorce Lawyers	离婚律师	Lu Chen	Cameo
2014	All Quiet in Peking	北平无战事	Qi Mutang	Special appearance
2014	Cosmetology High	美人制造	Yuan Tiangang	Cameo
2014	Mr. Goodman – A Story of Emotion Care	好男儿之情感护理	Ye Shilong	Cameo
2014	The Empress of China	武媚娘传奇	Li Mu	Special appearance
2015	My Sunshine	何以笙簫默	Barber	Cameo
2015	Strawhat Police	草帽警察	Liu Wusi	
2015	City of Angels	天使的城	Li Feixiang	
2015	Xiucai Encountered Soldiers	春江英雄之秀才遇到兵	Long Qianyan	
2015	Three Dads	三个奶爸	Yu Zheng	
2015	Boys to Men	爸爸快长大	Cui Zheng	
2016	The Good Fellas	好家伙	Shi Guang	also producer
2017	The Advisors Alliance	军师联盟	Cao Pi	
2019	Seven Days	七日生	Lee	
2020	Beijing Xicheng Story	幸福里的春天	Li Qiang	

=== Variety show ===
Year	English title	Chinese title	Role	Notes/Ref.
2013	Singing All Over the World	唱游天下第二季	Host	Season 2
2014–present	Keep Running	奔跑吧	Cast member and leader	
2015–2016	Challenger's Alliance	挑战者联盟	Cast member	
2019	Super Penguin League; Season:2	超级企鹅联盟super3	Player; Live Basketball Competition	
2020	Super Penguin League; Season:3	超级企鹅联盟super3	Player; Live Basketball Competition	

== Discography ==
=== Singles ===
Year	English title	Chinese title	Album	Notes
2008	"Decision"	决定	The Line OST	
2011	"By Your Side"	在你身边	Struggle OST	
2011	"I Do"	我愿意	Struggle OST	
2012	"Living"	活着	Beijing Youth OST	
2015	"Teenage Dream"	少年梦	Xiucai Encountered Soldiers OST	
2019	—N/a	"造亿万吨光芒"	Keep Running theme song	With Angelababy, Zheng Kai, Zhu Yawen, Wang Yanlin, Lucas Wong and Song Yuqi

== Accolades ==
=== Awards and nominations ===
Year	Award	Category	Nominated work	Result	Ref.
2008	5th China Movie Channel Media Awards	Best New Actor	Ultimate Rescue	Won	
2009	47th International Emmy Awards	Best Performance by an Actor	Ultimate Rescue	Nominated	
2010	5th Huading Awards	Newcomer Award	—N/a	Won	
2011	4th China Student Television Festival	Most Popular Actor	—N/a	Won	
2012	31st Hundred Flowers Awards	Best Supporting Actor	Aftershock	Nominated	
2012	5th China Image Film Festival	Best Supporting Actor	Saving General Yang	Nominated	
2012	8th Huading Awards	Best Actor (Youth)	Beijing Youth	Won	
2014	2nd Asia Rainbow TV Awards	Outstanding Actor	Beijing Youth	Won	
2014	10th National Top-Notch Television Production Ceremony	Top 10 Actors	Angel is Coming	Won	
2016	18th Huading Awards	Best TV Actor	—N/a	Won	
2016	23rd Beijing Student Film Festival	Most Popular Actor	MBA Partners	Won	
2018	9th China Film Director's Guild Awards	Best Director	Sky Hunter	Nominated	
2018	23rd Huading Awards	Best Director	Sky Hunter	Nominated	
2018	23rd Huading Awards	Best New Director	Sky Hunter	Won	
2018	25th Beijing College Student Film Festival	Students' Choice Award for Favorite Director	Sky Hunter	Won	
2019	6th The Actors of China Award	Best Actor (Sapphire Category)	Seven Days	Nominated	

=== Forbes China Celebrity 100 ===
Year	Rank	Ref.
2013	35th	
2014	83rd	
2015	19th	
2017	55th	
2020	89th	
