= The Looming Storm =

- 暴雪将至
- Directed by: Dong Yue
- Written by: Dong Yue
- Produced by: Luo Yan
- Starring: Duan Yihong; Jiang Yiyan
- Cinematography: Cai Tao
- Music by: Ding Ke
- Distributed by: Century Fortune Pictures; At Entertainment; Wild Bunch Distribution
- Release dates: 29 October 2017 (Tokyo International Film Festival); 17 November 2017 (China)
- Running time: 120 minutes
- Country: China
- Language: Mandarin

The Looming Storm (Chinese: 暴雪将至; pinyin: Bàoxuě jiāng zhì) is a 2017 Chinese neo-noir suspense film directed and written by Dong Yue. The film was screened at the 30th Tokyo International Film Festival. Duan Yihong won Best Actor Award at the Tokyo International Film Festival and Chinese Film Media Awards 2018.

== Plot ==
The story took place in a small town in the 1990s. Successive murders show that a vicious and cold-blooded serial killer lurks in this rainy city, and that this person is most likely to be local. Insiders in a factory. Yu Guowei (Duan Yihong) is a director of the Factory Security Division. He was called "Yu Shen Tan" because he has repeatedly cracked the theft cases in the factory.
After the murder, Yu Guowei felt that he had the responsibility to contribute to investigating the truth of the case. I don't know that Yu Guowei was just a joke in the eyes of the criminal investigation team leader Zhang Zhang (Du Yuan) and Li police officer (Zheng Chuyi). The presence. Yu Guowei decided to use his own strength to investigate the truth of the case and met a woman named Yan Zi (Jiang Yiyan) in an accident. There is a repressed and subtle relationship between Yu Guowei and the swallow.

== Cast ==
- Duan Yihong as Yu Guowei
- Jiang Yiyan as Yanzi
- Du Yuan as Lao Zhang
- Zheng Wei as Xiao Liu
- Zheng Chuyi as Police Officer Li
- Zhang Lin as Song Jun
- Liu Tao as middle age woman
- Chen Gang as truck driver
- Su Yujie as Dongzi
- Zhang Penghao as Secretary
- Li Xianliang as Hu
- Zhou Wei as Da Zou
- Cao Bo as Li Feng
- Zhao Ziyan as Xiao Yong
- Guo Jiulong as Doorman
