= Soldiers Sortie =

- 士兵突击
- Genre: Military drama
- Created by: Huayi Brothers Media Group (华谊兄弟电视娱乐有限公司)
- Written by: Lan Xiaolong (兰晓龙)
- Directed by: Kang Honglei (康红雷)
- Starring: Wang Baoqiang
- Country of origin: China
- Original language: Mandarin
- No. of episodes: 28

Production
- Producers: Zhang Qian (张谦) as chief producer Wu Yi (吴毅)
- Running time: 50 minutes (approx.)

Original release
- Network: Xi'an TV
- Release: 24 December 2006 – 2007

Soldiers Sortie (simplified Chinese: 士兵突击; traditional Chinese: 士兵突擊) is a 2007 Chinese TV drama based on a novel by Lan Xiaolong. It was co-produced by the 8-1 Film Studio, Chengdu Military Region Television Arts Center, Huayi Brothers Film Investment Co. Ltd., and Yunnan TV Station. The production cast includes Kang Honglei as director, Wu Yi as producer, Qian Zhang as chief producer, and Lan Xiaolong as script writer.

== Cast ==
- Wang Baoqiang (王宝强) as Private, later NCO (Class 1) XU Sanduo (许三多): A shy village boy, forced to quit school and drafted into the People's Liberation Army by his alcoholic father, to toughen him up.
- Chen Sicheng (陈思成) as Private, later NCO (Class 1) CHENG Cai (成才): A boy from the same village as Sanduo, a childhood bully but a very talented soldier. He joins the army with Sanduo and goes to Section 7 of the 7th Company, where he is trained as a marksman.
- Xing Jiadong (邢佳栋) as NCO (Class 2) WU Liuyi (伍六一): Second-in-command of Section 3
- Zhang Yi (张译) as NCO (Class 3), SHI Jin (史今): Commander of Section 3, who drafted Sanduo into the boot camp.
- Fan Lei (范雷) as NCO (Class 3) MA (老马): Commander of Section 5 of the 3rd Company.
- Zhang Guoqiang (张国强) as Captain, later Major GAO Cheng (高城): Commanding officer of the "Steel" 7th Company.
- Duan Yihong (段奕宏) as Lieutenant Colonel YUAN Lang (袁朗): Leader of the "Unit A" special ops.
- Li Chen (李晨) as Lieutenant Commander WU Zhe (吴哲): "Unit A" recruit, and one of XU Sanduo's best friends in the detachment.
- Gao Feng (高峰) as Captain QI Huan (齐桓): A member of "Unit A" and the trainer for the entry training.
- Li Bo (李博) as Private, later NCO (Class 1) GAN Xiaoning (甘小宁): A soldier of the 7th Company and a friend of Sanduo.
- Zuo Tengyun (左腾云) as Private BAI Tiejun (白铁军): A soldier of the 7th Company.
- Li Liang (李梁) as Cadet MA Xiaoshuai (马小帅): The last member of the 7th Company, a later 2nd Lieutenant in the Reconnaissance Battalion of T Division.

== See also ==
- People's Liberation Army
- Zhao Zongqi, served as a military consultant for the series
- QBZ-95
- Type 07
- My Chief and my Regiment
