= The Breakup Guru =

- Traditional Chinese: 分手大師
- Simplified Chinese: 分手大师
- Hanyu Pinyin: fēnshǒu dàshī
- Directed by: Deng Chao; Yu Baimei
- Written by: Baimei Yu
- Produced by: Rob Stanic; Tim Purcell
- Starring: Deng Chao; Yang Mi; Guli Nazha; Liu Yan
- Cinematography: Du Jie
- Edited by: Yiran Tu
- Release date: June 27, 2014
- Running time: 116 minutes
- Country: China
- Language: Mandarin
- Box office: US$111.4 million

The Breakup Guru (Chinese: 分手大师) is a 2014 Chinese romantic-comedy-drama film directed by Deng Chao and Yu Baimei and also starring Deng Chao and Yang Mi. The film was released on June 27, 2014.

== Plot ==
Mei Yuangui (Deng Chao), a professional 'Breakup Guru', who is hired by a client to end a relationship with Ye Xiaochun (Yang Mi). But his penchant and skill at breaking up couples without complication and worry is put to the test when a battle of wits ensues with Xiao Zhuang (Guli Nazha), risking his reputation and setting up the ultimate test of his services!

== Cast ==
- Deng Chao as Mei Yuan Gui
- Yang Mi as Xiao Chun Ye
- Guli Nazha as Xiao Zhuang
- Liu Yan as Madam Tang
- Sun Li as herself

== Reception ==
The film has earned US$107,440,000 in China. It earned a total of US$111.4 million worldwide.

On Film Business Asia, Derek Elley gave the film a grade of 6 out of 10.
