= The Dead End =

The Dead End Lièrì zhuó xīn
- Theatrical poster
- Directed by: Cao Baoping
- Screenplay by: Cao Baoping; Mia Jiao
- Based on: Sunspot by Xu Yigua
- Produced by: Ye Jinjun; Cao Baoping
- Starring: Deng Chao; Duan Yihong; Guo Tao; Wang Luodan
- Cinematography: Luo Pan
- Edited by: Cao Baoping; Li Yongyi
- Music by: Bai Shui
- Production companies: Dream Sky Film; Bona Film Group; Beijing Standard Image Culture Communication
- Release dates: June 15, 2015 (SIFF); August 27, 2015 (China)
- Running time: 137 minutes 227 minutes (director's cut)
- Country: China
- Language: Mandarin
- Box office: US$46.75 million

The Dead End (Chinese: 烈日灼心) is a 2015 Chinese crime drama film based on Xu Yigua's novel Sunspot (Chinese: 太阳黑子). The film is directed by Cao Baoping, starring Deng Chao, Duan Yihong, Guo Tao, and Wang Luodan. The film was released on August 27, 2015. The film received positive reviews in regard to its performance, cinematography and mise-en-scene.

== Plot ==
Seven years after the events of the Water Chamber Murders, newly transferred officer Yi Guchun began to suspect that his assistant police, Xin Xiaofeng, is deeply-tied with the murders.

== Cast ==
- Deng Chao as Xin Xiaofeng, an assistant police, Tail's adoptive father and one of the three suspects for the murder.
- Duan Yihong as Yi Guchun, Guxia's elder brother, a police officer and Xiaofeng's superior.
- Guo Tao as Yang Zidao, a taxi driver, Tail's adoptive father, Guxia's love interest and one of the three suspects for the murder.
- Wang Luodan as Yi Guxia, Guchun's younger sister.
- Jackie Lui as David, a Taiwanese architect and designer.
- Li Xiaochuan
- Du Zhiguo
- Xu Xihan as Tail, the trio's adoptive daughter.
- Yan Bei
- Wang Yanhui
- Bai Liuxi
- Gao Hu as Chen Bijue, a fisherman, Tail's adoptive father and one of the three suspects for the murder.

== Production ==
During the filming phase, Deng Chao almost suffocated during a scene where his character's leg was supposed to be stuck in an iron fence. He also suffered from insomnia, mental breakdown, depression and claustrophobia for a short while during and after filming.

== Accolades ==
Year	Award	Category	Recipient(s) and nominee(s)	Result	Notes
2015	18th Shanghai International Film Festival	Best Director	Cao Baoping	Won	
2015	18th Shanghai International Film Festival	Best Actor	Deng Chao, Duan Yihong, Guo Tao	Won	
2015	11th Chinese American Film Festival	Best Film		Won	
2015	52nd Golden Horse Film Awards	Best Actor	Deng Chao	Nominated	
2016	7th China Film Director's Guild Awards	Best Film		Nominated	
2016	7th China Film Director's Guild Awards	Best Director	Cao Baoping	Nominated	
2016	7th China Film Director's Guild Awards	Best Actor	Deng Chao, Duan Yihong	Nominated	
2016	7th China Film Director's Guild Awards	Best Screenplay	Cao Baoping, Mia Jiao	Nominated	
2016	33rd Hundred Flowers Awards	Best Film		Won	
2016	33rd Hundred Flowers Awards	Best Screenplay	Cao Baoping, Mia Jiao	Won	
2016	33rd Hundred Flowers Awards	Best Actor	Deng Chao	Nominated	
2016	33rd Hundred Flowers Awards	Best Supporting Actor	Duan Yihong	Nominated	
2016	13th Changchun Film Festival	Best Supporting Actress	Wang Luodan	Won	
2017	31st Golden Rooster Awards	Best Director	Cao Baoping	Nominated	
2017	31st Golden Rooster Awards	Best Actor	Deng Chao	Won	
2017	31st Golden Rooster Awards	Best Editing	Li Yongyi	Nominated	
