= Cao Baoping =

Chinese film director

- 曹保平
- Born: January 2, 1962 (age 64); Datong, Shanxi, China
- Education: Beijing Film Academy
- Occupations: Film director, Screenwriter, Producer
- Known for: Chinese neo-noir and crime films
- Notable work: Across the Furious Sea; The Equation of Love and Death; The Dead End; Trouble Makers
- Movement: Fifth Generation
- Awards: Asian New Talent Jury Prize – Shanghai; 2006 – Trouble Makers; Altadis New Director Award – San Sebastian International Film Festival; 2008 – The Equation of Love and Death; 18th Shanghai International Film Festival – Best Director Award; 25th Chinese Film Golden Rooster Award – Best Picture and Best Screenplay
- Website: https://weibo.com/u/3921955571

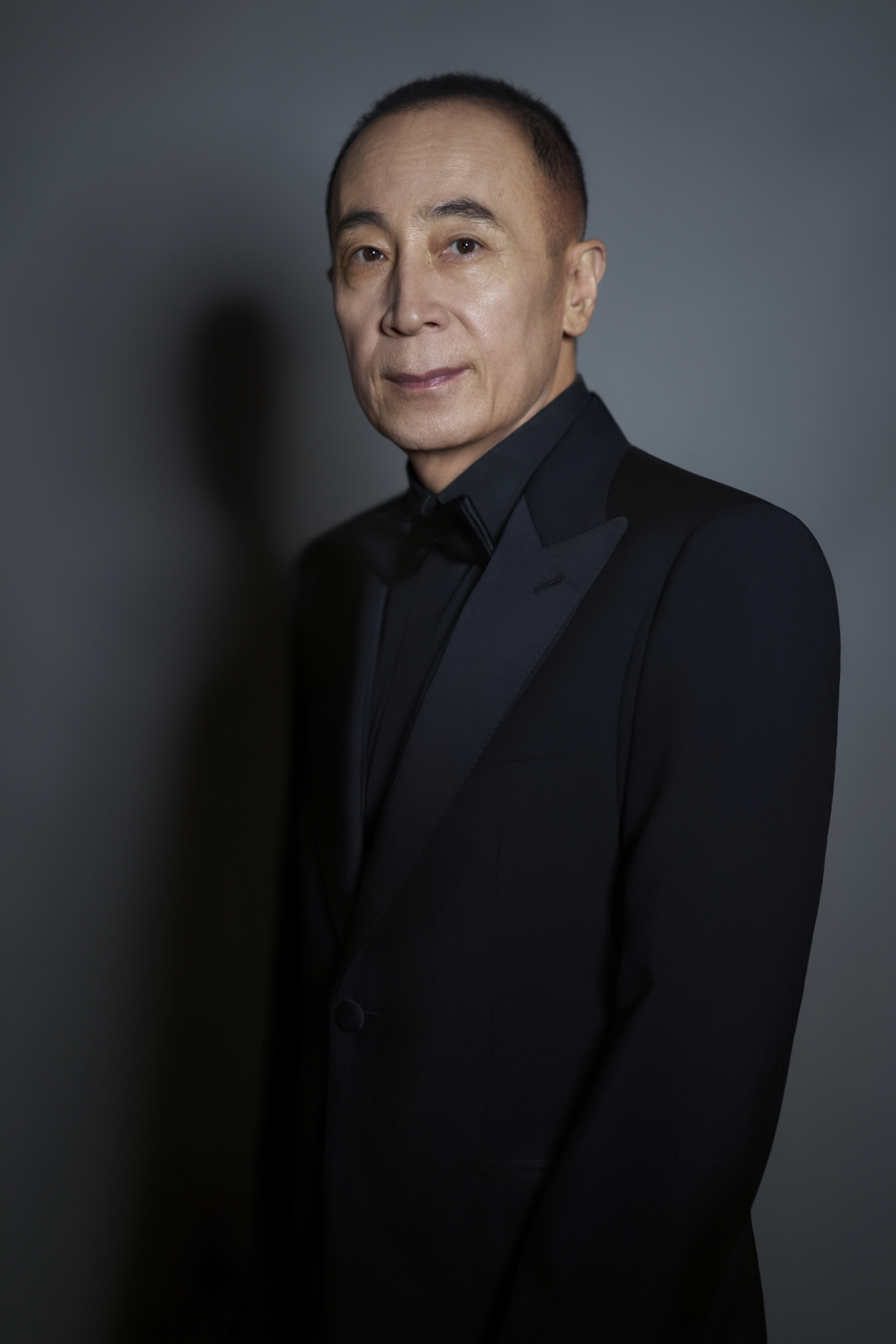
Cao Baoping, Chinese film director and screenwriter.

Cao Baoping (Chinese: 曹保平; pinyin: Cáo Bǎopíng; born January 2, 1962) is a Chinese film director, screenwriter, and producer, a Beijing Film Academy (BFA) graduate and current Professor in Screenwriting.

As a veteran storyteller of China's film noir and crime film genre, he received multiple accolades including Altadis New Directors Award at the 56th San Sebastian International Film Festival, Best Director at the 18th and 27th Shanghai International Film Festival and the Hundred Flowers Award for Best Film. In 2017 and 2019, he served as a jury member for the 20th Shanghai International Film Festival and 9th Beijing International Film Festival respectively.

Cao's films often center on humanity in extreme conditions. Exploring human nature is the ultimate and eternal theme of his works.

Some industry watchers, like Variety, have situated directors like Cao between the older fifth generation directors, such as Chen Kaige or Zhang Yimou, who have achieved major international and box-office success, and the more "underground" sixth generation directors, like Jia Zhangke and Wang Xiaoshuai.

== Directorial career ==
Cao Baoping graduated from the Beijing Film Academy in 1989, and spent most of the 1990s teaching screenwriting at his alma mater. Cao would go on to expand into directing television and television films, co-directing the television film Absolute Emotion in 2001.

His solo debut as director was 2006's Trouble Makers, a satirical black comedy about a village taking revenge on a gang of hoodlums. Due to its rough content, Trouble Makers faced a host of problems from censors and spent six years in gestation before finally being released. The film premiered at the 2006 Shanghai International Film Festival, where it was called by Variety's Derek Elley as a standout entry.

In 2008, Cao followed up Trouble Makers with The Equation of Love and Death, starring Zhou Xun. The film was well received and Cao would win a best new director award at the San Sebastian International Film Festival for his efforts.

== Filmography ==
=== Film ===
| Year | English Title | Chinese Title | Notes |
|---|---|---|---|
| 2006 | Trouble Makers | 光荣的愤怒 | Feature film debut |
| 2008 | The Equation of Love and Death | 李米的猜想 | |
| 2013 | Einstein & Einstein | 狗十三 | |
| 2015 | The Dead End | 烈日灼心 | |
| 2016 | Cock and Bull | 追凶者也 | |
| 2023 | Across the Furious Sea | 涉过愤怒的海 | |
| 2025 | One Wacky Summer | 脱缰者也 | |
