= 2006 Shanghai International Film Festival =

Chinese film festival

The 2006 Shanghai International Film Festival was the ninth such festival to be held, and took place over the course of two weeks between June 17 and June 25, 2006.

In all, over 764 films were submitted, but only seventeen were selected to compete for the Golden Goblet or "Jin Jue." The jury was chaired by French filmmaker Luc Besson.

== International reaction ==
The 2006 rendition of the Shanghai International Film Festival was meant to place the program as a top echelon international festival. Problems plagued the two-week festival, however, including poor Chinese-English translations and a failure by many of the filmmakers to even attend the award ceremony.

== Awards ==
- Golden Goblet Best Film
  - Four Minutes (Germany) (directed by Chris Kraus
- Best Actor
  - Olivier Gourmet for his performance in Burnt Out (France)
- Best Actress
  - Els Dottermans for her performance in Love Belongs to Everyone (Belgium)
- Best Director
  - Fabienne Godet for Burnt Out
- Best Screenplay
  - Hugo Van Laere for Love Belongs to Everyone
- Best Cinematography
  - Fabio Cianchetti for Our Land (Italy) (directed by Sergio Rubini)
- Best Music
  - Karl Jenkins for River Queen (New Zealand) (directed by Vincent Ward)
- Jury Grand Prix
