= Zhang Guoqiang =

Chinese actor (born 1969)

Zhang Gaoqiang
- Born: September 30, 1969 (age 55); Jiamusi, Heilongjiang
- Occupation: Actor
- Years active: 1990–present
- Children: Son

Chinese name
- Traditional Chinese: 張國強
- Simplified Chinese: 张国强
Transcriptions
Standard Mandarin
- Hanyu Pinyin: Zhang Guoqiang
Yue: Cantonese
- Jyutping: jeung1 gwok3 keung4
- Website: https://blog.sina.com.cn/u/1278193203

Zhang Guoqiang (Chinese: 张国强; pinyin: Zhang Guoqiáng; born September 30, 1969) is a Chinese actor.

== Childhood ==
Zhang was born to a family of entertainers. His mother's grandfather was a famous Pingju (a kind of Chinese folk opera) performer. His parents were also opera performers.

== Personal life ==
Zhang Guoqiang has one son.

Zhang Guoqiang has maintained strong friendships with fellow Soldiers' Sortie and My Chief, My Regiment cast members, such as Zhang Yi (张译), Duan Yihong (段奕宏) and Chen Sicheng (陈思成), as well as with director Kang Honglei (康洪雷). He is in charge of organizing cast-and-crew reunions during off-time in Beijing.

== Filmography ==
- Dearest (2014)
- The Rescue (2020) (cameo)
