= Duan Yihong =

Chinese actor

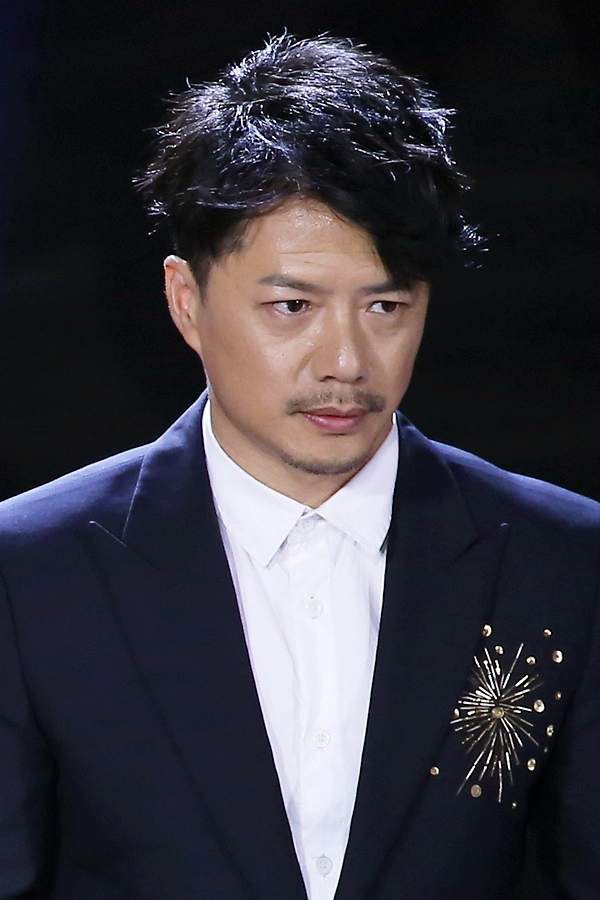
- Duan in 2017
- Born: Duan Long; May 16, 1973 (age 53); Yining City, Xinjiang, China
- Education: Central Academy of Drama
- Occupation: Actor
- Years active: 1998–present
- Spouse: Wang Jin (m. 2011)

Duan Yihong (Chinese: 段奕宏; pinyin: Duàn Yìhóng; born May 16, 1973) is a Chinese actor best known for his role as Yuan Lang in Soldiers Sortie (2006), Long Wenzhang in My Chief and My Regiment (2009), and Hei Wa in White Deer Plain (2011).

== Biography ==
Duan Yihong was born in Yili, Xinjiang province. In 1992 and 1993, he applied to the Central Academy of Drama, but he was not accepted. Third -degree candidates until 1994, that he was admitted. After graduating in 1998, he entered the National Theatre Company of China. After, Duan starred in many plays, he is the drama Rhinoceros in Love second-generation actor. During this period, he was renamed to Duan Yihong.

== Personal life ==
Duan began dating Chinese-Japanese actress Wang Jin (王瑾) in 2002. He married Wang on 12 June 2011 in Beijing.

== Filmography ==
=== Film ===
Year	English title	Chinese title	Role	Notes/Ref.
2000		刑警张玉贵	Lin Peng	
2001	One Meter Sunshine	一米阳光	Liu Yun	
2003	Drifters	二弟	Er Di	
2004	Zee-Oui	细伟	Zee-Oui	a Thai film based on the urban legend of Zee-Oui (ซีอุย)
2006	Summer Palace	颐和园	Teacher Tang	
2007	Watching Peace	守望平安	Ah Ming	
2008	Desires of the Heart	桃花运	Yang Zong	
2009	The Message	风声	Ye Jianbo	Cameo
2009	Eternal Beloved	爱有来生	Ming	
2010	Hot Summer Days	全城热恋	Leslie	
2010	Wind Blast	西风烈	Xiang Xi	
2012	The Honeymoon of Three People	三个人的蜜月	Yang Yang	
2012	White Deer Plain	白鹿原	Hei Wa	
2012	I Do	我愿意	Wang Yang	
2012	Back to 1942	一九四二	Chen Bulei	
2012	General's Command	将令		
2013	Love Evolutionism	爱情进化论	Pan Xiaozhe	
2014	The Milky Way	天河	Jiang Hao	
2015	The Dead End	烈日灼心	Yi Guchun	
2017	Extraordinary Mission	非凡任务	Eagle	
2017	Battle of Memories	记忆大师	Shen Hanqiang	
2017	The Looming Storm	暴雪将至	Yu Guowei	
2017	Explosion	引爆者	Zhao Xudong	
2020	Home Sweet Home	秘密访客		
2021	The Battle at Lake Changjin	长津湖	Tan Ziwei	
2022	The Battle at Lake Changjin II	长津湖之水门桥	Tan Ziwei	
2025	Operation Hadal	蛟龙行动	Fang Yi	

=== Television series ===
Year	English title	Chinese title	Role	Notes/Ref.
1998	Mother	母亲	Zhang Yecan	
1999		刑警本色	Luo Yang	
2000		石瀑布		
2001		让爱作主	Chen Daming	
2002	The Proof of Memories	记忆的证明	Zhou Shangwen	
2003	The Legend of Li Ji	骊姬传奇	You Shi	
2006	Soldiers Sortie	士兵突击	Yuan Lang	
2006		大院子女	Zhang Weiping	
2007		红旗渠的儿女们	Wang Daqun	
2007		女子戏班	Zheng Shichang	
2009	My Chief and My Regiment	我的团长我的团	Long Wenzhang	
2010	The Last 99 Days	最后的99天	Xiao Peng	
2010	The Greed of Man	大时代	Chen Dingtian	
2010	Shanghai Shanghai	上海上海	Liu Gongzheng	
2011	The Shengtianmen Gate	圣天门口	Kang Jiufeng	
2012	King's War	楚汉传奇	Han Xin	
2013	Meng's Place	海上孟府	Meng Wenlu	
2018	The Brothers in Blood	浴血三兄弟	Lu Changfeng	
2019		往事云烟	Wei Zhenhai	
2019	For the Holy Guiguzi	谋圣鬼谷子	Wang Chan	
2020	The Qin Empire IV	大秦帝国之天下	Lü Buwei	
2021	Double Tap	双探	Li Huiyan	
2021		八角亭谜雾	Yuan Fei	
2023		明日生存指南	Luo Feng	

== Accolades ==
Year	Awards	Category	Nominated work	Ref.
2003	34th International Film Festival of India	Best Actor	Drifters	
2009	15th Shanghai Television Festival	Most Popular Actor	My Chief and My Regiment	
2011	13th Golden Phoenix Awards	Society Award	Wind Blast	
2013	13th Chinese Film Media Awards	Most Anticipated Actor	White Deer Plain	
2015	18th Shanghai International Film Festival	Best Actor	The Dead End	
2016	16th Chinese Film Media Awards	Jury Award	The Dead End	
2016	18th Huading Awards	Best Actor	The Dead End	
2017	16th Golden Phoenix Awards	Society Award	The Dead End	
2017	16th New York Asian Film Festival	Star Asia Award	—N/a	
2017	30th Tokyo International Film Festival	Best Actor	The Looming Storm	
2018	4th Jackie Chan Action Movie Awards	Best Actor	Explosion	
